= 1968–69 PAOK FC season =

PAOK
1968–69 season
- President: Vassilios Zervas; Evangelos Mylonas
- Manager: Jane Janevski
- Stadium: Toumba Stadium
- Alpha Ethniki: 5th
- Greek Cup: Quarter-finals
- Top goalscorer: League: Giorgos Koudas (26); All: Giorgos Koudas (20)
- Highest home attendance: 29,442 vs Aris

The 1968–69 season was PAOK Football Club's 43rd in existence and the club's 10th consecutive season in the top flight of Greek football. The team entered the Greek Football Cup in second round.

== Players ==
=== Squad ===
Note: Flags indicate national team as defined under FIFA eligibility rules; some limited exceptions apply. Players may hold more than one non-FIFA nationality.

No.	Pos.	Nation	Player
—	GK	GRE	Apostolos Savvoulidis
—	GK	GRE	Kostas Pirtsos
—	DF	GRE	Aristos Fountoukidis
—	DF	GRE	Emilios Theofanidis
—	DF	GRE	Giorgos Makris
—	DF	GRE	Giorgos Papachristoudis
—	DF	GRE	Nikos Mitrakas
—	DF	GRE	Christos Katsikaris
—	MF	GRE	Giorgos Koudas (captain)
—	MF	GRE	Stavros Sarafis
—	MF	GRE	Christos Terzanidis

No.	Pos.	Nation	Player
—	MF	GRE	Toulis Mouratidis
—	MF	GRE	Giannis Giakoumis
—	MF	GRE	Vasilis Lazos
—	MF	GRE	Pavlos Siantsis
—	MF	GRE	Avessalom Konstantinidis
—	FW	GRE	Anestis Afentoulidis
—	FW	GRE	Dimitris Paridis
—	FW	GRE	Achilleas Aslanidis
—	FW	GRE	Leandros Symeonidis
—	FW	GRE	Andreas Konstantinidis

== Transfers ==
Players transferred in

Transfer Window	Pos.	Name	Club	Fee
Summer	GK	(Greece) Kostas Pirtsos	(Greece) AE Neapoli Thessaloniki	?
Summer	MF	(Greece) Pavlos Siantsis	(Greece) Ermis Amyntaio	?
Summer	MF	(Greece) Christos Terzanidis	(Greece) Orfeas Eleftheroupoli	225.000 Dr.
Summer	FW	(Greece) Dimitris Paridis	(Greece) Kavala	100.000 Dr. + Exchange
Summer	FW	(Greece) Achilleas Aslanidis	(Greece) Apollon Kalamarias	650.000 Dr.

Players transferred out

Transfer Window	Pos.	Name	Club	Fee
Summer	DF	(Greece) Giorgos Tatsis	(Greece) Kavala	Exchange
Summer	FW	(Greece) Onoufrios Charalampidis	(Greece) Kavala	Exchange
Summer	FW	(Greece) Grigoris Macheridis	(Greece) Kavala	Exchange

== Pre-season ==
Win Draw Loss

18 August 1968 Friendly	PAOK	2–1	Kavala	Thessaloniki
	Koudas 64', 69'		Tatsis 48'	Stadium: Toumba Stadium; Attendance: 11,629

25 August 1968 Friendly	Kavala	3–1	PAOK	Kavala
	Barbalexis 11'; Macheridis 79'; Karabetakis 85'		Paridis 48'	Stadium: Kavala Old Stadium; Referee: Angelidis

1 September 1968 Friendly	PAOK	3–2	Iraklis	Thessaloniki
				Stadium: Toumba Stadium

8 September 1968 Friendly	PAOK	2–1	Apollon Kalamarias	Thessaloniki
	Theofanidis 25' (pen.); Aslanidis 54' (pen.)		Tsoplakis 43'	Stadium: Toumba Stadium; Referee: Giannakos

12 September 1968 Friendly	PAOK	1–4	Partizan	Thessaloniki
	Koudas		Tošić 13', 84'; Đorđević 20'; Papachristoudis 25' (o.g.)	Stadium: Kaftanzoglio Stadium

15 September 1968 Friendly	PAOK	1–2	AEK Athens	Thessaloniki
	Mitrakas 47'		Papageorgiou 30'; Ventouris 82'	Stadium: Toumba Stadium; Attendance: 11,522

== Competitions ==
=== Overview ===
Competition	Record							
Competition	Pld	W	D	L	GF	GA	GD	Win %
Alpha Ethniki	34	16	10	8	58	37	+21	47.06
Greek Cup	3	2	0	1	13	7	+6	66.67
Total	37	18	10	9	71	44	+27	48.65

Source: Competitions

== Alpha Ethniki ==
=== Standings ===
Pos	Team	Pld	W	D	L	GF	GA	GD	Pts	Qualification or relegation
3	Aris	34	17	11	6	54	33	+21	79	Invitation for Inter-Cities Fairs Cup first round
4	Panionios	34	18	7	9	55	34	+21	77	Invitation for Inter-Cities Fairs Cup first round
5	PAOK	34	16	10	8	58	37	+21	76	
6	AEK Athens (Note: AEK Athens were deducted 1 point.)	34	17	7	10	58	33	+25	74	
7	Egaleo	34	13	10	11	48	41	+7	70	

Source: RSSSF
Rules for classification: 1st points; 2nd decision match; 3rd head-to-head goal difference.

==== Results summary ====
Overall								Home						Away					
Pld	W	D	L	GF	GA	GD	Pts	W	D	L	GF	GA	GD	W	D	L	GF	GA	GD
34	16	10	8	58	37	+21	58	12	4	1	39	12	+27	4	6	7	19	25	−6

Last updated: 15 June 1969.
Source: Competitive matches

==== Results by round ====
Round	1	2	3	4	5	6	7	8	9	10	11	12	13	14	15	16	17	18	19	20	21	22	23	24	25	26	27	28	29	30	31	32	33	34
Ground	H	A	H	A	H	A	H	A	A	H	A	A	A	A	H	A	H	A	H	A	H	A	H	A	H	H	A	H	H	H	H	A	H	A
Result	W	D	W	W	D	L	W	L	L	W	L	D	D	D	L	W	W	D	W	D	D	L	W	W	D	W	L	W	W	D	W	L	W	W
Position	1	3	4	3	2	5	3	4	7	5	7	7	9	9	10	9	6	7	5	7	7	7	7	7	7	5	7	6	6	6	5	5	5	5

Source: League matches
A = Away; H = Home; W = Win; D = Draw; L = Loss

==== Matches ====
Win Draw Loss

22 September 1968 1	PAOK	4–1	OFI	Thessaloniki
	Koudas 33', 37' (penalty missed) 64'; Aslanidis 44'; Lazos 88'		Karakyriakos 59'	Stadium: Toumba Stadium; Attendance: 18,960

30 September 1968 2	Apollon Athens	1–1	PAOK	Athens
	Ramfos 7'		Sarafis 2'	Stadium: Rizoupoli Stadium; Attendance: 13,565

6 October 1968 3	PAOK	2–1	Veria	Thessaloniki
	Koudas 14'; Sarafis 63'		Michailidis 51'	Stadium: Toumba Stadium; Attendance: 18,487

20 October 1968 4	AEK Athens	0–1	PAOK	Piraeus
			Koudas 67'	Stadium: Karaiskakis Stadium; Attendance: 26,336; Referee: Giannopoulos
Note: Game held at Karaiskakis Stadium because there were repair and maintenance works at Nikos Goumas Stadium.

27 October 1968 5	PAOK	1–1	Panionios	Thessaloniki
	Theofanidis 31'		Intzoglou 1'	Stadium: Toumba Stadium; Attendance: 11,596; Referee: Christos Michas

3 November 1968 6	Iraklis	3–1	PAOK	Thessaloniki
	Kalliontzis 21', 74'; Kasapis 60'		Koudas 42'	Stadium: Toumba Stadium; Attendance: 21,014; Referee: Famelis
Note: Game held at Toumba Stadium because Kaftanzoglio Stadium was temporarily closed.

10 November 1968 7	PAOK	5–0	AEL Limassol	Thessaloniki
	Koudas 11', 14', 72'; Sarafis 73'; Theofanidis 89'			Stadium: Toumba Stadium; Attendance: 2,211

17 November 1968 8	Aris	2–0	PAOK	Thessaloniki
	Syropoulos 20'; Alexiadis 83'		Giakoumis (red card) 67'	Stadium: Kleanthis Vikelidis Stadium; Attendance: 20,123; Referee: Christos Michas

24 November 1968 9	Pierikos	3–1	PAOK	Katerini
	Amanatidis 57'; Felekidis 70'; Papadopoulos 90'		Paridis 53'	Stadium: Katerini Stadium; Attendance: 4,715

1 December 1968 10	PAOK	1–0	Vyzas Megara	Thessaloniki
	Paridis 74'			Stadium: Toumba Stadium; Attendance: 10,902; Referee: Panakis

15 December 1968 11	Olympiacos	3–0	PAOK	Piraeus
	Michas 64'; Botinos 72'; Sideris 84'		Lazos (red card) 60'	Stadium: Karaiskakis Stadium; Attendance: 21,116; Referee: Vamvakopoulos

22 December 1968 12	Chalkida	1–1	PAOK	Chalkis
	Rongas 72'		Giakoumis 84'	Stadium: Chalkida Municipal Stadium; Attendance: 4,181; Referee: Giannopoulos

29 December 1968 13	Egaleo	2–2	PAOK	Athens
	Markopoulos 84'; Makris 90+3'		Paridis 28'; Fountoukidis (red card) 55'; Lazos (red card) 56'; Theofanidis 65' (pen.)	Stadium: Stavros Mavrothalassitis Stadium; Attendance: 8,096; Referee: Pagourtzis

5 January 1969 14	Trikala	1–1	PAOK	Trikala
	Beveniou 30'		Koudas 60'	Stadium: Trikala Municipal Stadium; Attendance: 3,484; Referee: Kreouzis

12 January 1969 15	PAOK	1–2	Panathinaikos	Thessaloniki
	Theofanidis 27' (pen.)		Gonios 12'; Domazos 73'	Stadium: Toumba Stadium; Attendance: 26,572; Referee: Christos Michas

19 January 1969 16	Ethnikos Piraeus	0–2	PAOK	Piraeus
			Aslanidis 11'; Afentoulidis 23'; Terzanidis (red card) 43'	Stadium: Karaiskakis Stadium; Attendance: 7,757; Referee: Dikopoulos

26 January 1969 17	PAOK	2–1	Panserraikos	Thessaloniki
	Afentoulidis 47'; Theofanidis (penalty missed) 69'; Aslanidis 89' (pen.)		Iliadis 65'	Stadium: Toumba Stadium; Attendance: 13,368; Referee: Geroukalis

2 February 1969 18	OFI	1–1	PAOK	Heraklion
	Papoutsakis 75' (pen.); Papadopoulos (red card) 85'		Mitrakas 89'	Stadium: Theodoros Vardinogiannis Stadium; Attendance: 7,302; Referee: Kougios

9 February 1969 19	PAOK	2–0	Apollon Athens	Thessaloniki
	Fountoukidis 48'; Makris (red card) 72'; Sarafis 82'		Kyriakou (red card) 72'	Stadium: Toumba Stadium; Attendance: 11,358; Referee: Papavasiliou

16 February 1969 20	Veria	1–1	PAOK	Veria
	Mittas 87' (pen.)		Aslanidis 53'	Stadium: Veria Stadium; Attendance: 7,741; Referee: Levogiannis

23 February 1969 21	PAOK	1–1	AEK Athens	Thessaloniki
	Terzanidis 23'		Papaioannou 59'	Stadium: Toumba Stadium; Attendance: 18,247; Referee: Dikopoulos

2 March 1969 22	Panionios	1–0	PAOK	Athens
	Ch.Intzoglou (red card) 60'; Th.Intzoglou 71'			Stadium: Nea Smyrni Stadium; Attendance: 8,490; Referee: Famelis

9 March 1969 23	PAOK	1–0	Iraklis	Thessaloniki
	Paridis 12'			Stadium: Toumba Stadium; Attendance: 16,150; Referee: Eleftheriadis

15 March 1969 24	AEL Limassol	0–2	PAOK	Limassol
			Koudas 10'; Sarafis 59'	Stadium: GSO Stadium; Attendance: 1,700; Referee: Marinos

23 March 1969 25	PAOK	0–0	Aris	Thessaloniki
				Stadium: Toumba Stadium; Attendance: 29,442; Referee: Karpodinis

30 March 1969 26	PAOK	5–1	Pierikos	Thessaloniki
	Sarafis 10'; Afentoulidis 44'; Fountoukidis 55'; Koudas 62', 68'		Papadopoulos 89'	Stadium: Toumba Stadium; Attendance: 11,833

6 April 1969 27	Vyzas Megara	2–1	PAOK	Megara
	Emmanouil 40'; Seitaridis 87'		Koudas 69'	Stadium: Megara Stadium; Referee: Kougias

20 April 1969 28	PAOK	2–1	Olympiacos	Thessaloniki
	Koudas 1' (pen.), 42'		Sideris 87'	Stadium: Toumba Stadium; Attendance: 26,745; Referee: Pazaropoulos

27 April 1969 29	PAOK	5–1	Chalkida	Thessaloniki
	Sarafis 2'; Koudas 8', 14'; Paridis 27'; Afentoulidis 61'		Simitzis 72'	Stadium: Toumba Stadium; Attendance: 10,956

18 May 1969 30	PAOK	1–1	Egaleo	Thessaloniki
	Afentoulidis 49'		Stavropoulos 86'	Stadium: Toumba Stadium; Attendance: 11,448; Referee: Papavasiliou

25 May 1969 31	PAOK	3–1	Trikala	Thessaloniki
	Afentoulidis 14' (pen.), 49'; Koudas 76'		Kalatzis 38'	Stadium: Toumba Stadium; Attendance: 6,798

1 June 1969 32	Panathinaikos	2–0	PAOK	Athens
	Gonios 28'; Athanasopoulos 42'			Stadium: Leoforos Stadium; Attendance: 22,787; Referee: Pazaropoulos

8 June 1969 33	PAOK	3–0	Ethnikos Piraeus	Thessaloniki
	Paridis 5', 25'; Sarafis 55'			Stadium: Makedonikos Stadium; Attendance: 6,607

15 June 1969 34	Panserraikos	2–4	PAOK	Serres
	Tsakiris (penalty missed) 8'; Bitzidis 20' (pen.); Naskos 43'		Koudas 29', 90'; Sarafis (penalty missed) 65' 70'; Afentoulidis 73' (pen.)	Stadium: Serres Municipal Stadium; Attendance: 5,411; Referee: Famelis

== Greek Cup ==
=== Second round ===
16 April 1969	PAOK	6–0	Megas Alexandros Thessaloniki	Thessaloniki
	Koudas 2', 5'; Paridis 21'; Sarafis 44', 60'; Fountoukidis 71'			Stadium: Toumba Stadium

=== Third round ===
4 June 1969	Panetolikos	2–3 (a.e.t.)	PAOK	Agrinio
	Kalamidas 34'; Koutsogiannis 75'		Koudas 25', 97'; Paridis 30'	Stadium: Panetolikos Stadium; Attendance: 4,691

=== Quarter-finals ===
3 July 1969	Ethnikos Piraeus	5–4 (a.e.t.)	PAOK	Piraeus
	Chatzioannoglou 23'; Leventakos 32'; Kritikopoulos 38', 69', 95'		Fountoukidis 8'; Koudas 14', 29'; Paridis 44'	Stadium: Karaiskakis Stadium

== Statistics ==
=== Squad statistics ===
As of July 3, 1969

Appearances denote players in the starting lineup, with the numbers in parentheses denoting appearances as substitute.

No.	Name	Alpha Ethniki		Greek Cup		Total	
No.	Name	Apps	Goals	Apps	Goals	Apps	Goals
Goalkeepers
	(Greece) Apostolos Savvoulidis	24	0	2	0	26	0
	(Greece) Kostas Pirtsos	13	0	2	0	15	0
Defenders
	(Greece) Aristos Fountoukidis	31	2	2	2	33	4
	(Greece) Emilios Theofanidis	28	4	3	0	31	4
	(Greece) Giorgos Makris	24	0	2	0	26	0
	(Greece) Nikos Mitrakas	23	1	3	0	26	1
	(Greece) Giorgos Papachristoudis	21	0	2	0	23	0
	(Greece) Christos Katsikaris	16	0	0	0	16	0
Midfielders
	(Greece) Stavros Sarafis	33	9	3	2	36	11
	(Greece) Giorgos Koudas	29	20	3	6	32	26
	(Greece) Christos Terzanidis	29	1	3	0	32	1
	(Greece) Giannis Giakoumis	22	1	3	0	25	1
	(Greece) Toulis Mouratidis	18	0	3	0	21	0
	(Greece) Vasilis Lazos	17	1	1	0	18	1
	(Greece) Avessalom Konstantinidis	9	0	0	0	9	0
	(Greece) Pavlos Siantsis	8	0	0	0	8	0
Forwards
	(Greece) Dimitris Paridis	29	7	3	3	32	10
	(Greece) Anestis Afentoulidis	24	8	3	0	27	8
	(Greece) Achilleas Aslanidis	24	4	1	0	25	4
	(Greece) Andreas Konstantinidis	4	0	0	0	4	0
	(Greece) Leandros Symeonidis	1	0	0	0	1	0

Source: Match reports in competitive matches, RSSSF

=== Goalscorers ===
Rank	No.	Pos.	Player	Alpha Ethniki	Greek Cup	Total
1		MF	(Greece) Giorgos Koudas	20	6	26
2		MF	(Greece) Stavros Sarafis	9	2	11
3		FW	(Greece) Dimitris Paridis	7	3	10
4		FW	(Greece) Anestis Afentoulidis	8	0	8
5		DF	(Greece) Emilios Theofanidis	4	0	4
5		FW	(Greece) Achilleas Aslanidis	4	0	4
5		DF	(Greece) Aristos Fountoukidis	2	2	4
8		DF	(Greece) Nikos Mitrakas	1	0	1
8		MF	(Greece) Christos Terzanidis	1	0	1
8		MF	(Greece) Giannis Giakoumis	1	0	1
8		MF	(Greece) Vasilis Lazos	1	0	1
TOTALS				58	13	71

Source: Match reports in competitive matches, RSSSF
