= 1970–71 PAOK FC season =

PAOK
1970–71 season
- President: Stavros Georgiadis
- Manager: Ivica Horvat; Giorgos Chasiotis; Les Shannon
- Stadium: Toumba Stadium
- Alpha Ethniki: 8th
- Greek Cup: Runners-up
- Inter-Cities Fairs Cup: 1st round
- Top goalscorer: League: Achilleas Aslanidis (9); All: Achilleas Aslanidis (13)
- Highest home attendance: 29,890 vs Aris

The 1970–71 season was PAOK Football Club's 45th in existence and the club's 12th consecutive season in the top flight of Greek football. The team entered the Greek Football Cup in first round.

== Players ==
=== Squad ===
Note: Flags indicate national team as defined under FIFA eligibility rules; some limited exceptions apply. Players may hold more than one non-FIFA nationality.

No.	Pos.	Nation	Player
—	GK	GRE	Savvas Chatzioannou
—	GK	GRE	Apostolos Savvoulidis
—	GK	GRE	Stelios Christodoulou
—	GK	GRE	Kostas Pirtsos
—	DF	GRE	Ioannis Gounaris
—	DF	GRE	Aristos Fountoukidis
—	DF	GRE	Michalis Bellis
—	DF	GRE	Pavlos Papadopoulos
—	DF	GRE	Ioannis Chatziantoniou
—	DF	GRE	Kostas Vergos
—	DF	GRE	Giorgos Makris
—	DF	GRE	Giorgos Kontogiorgos
—	DF	GRE	Giorgos Papachristoudis

No.	Pos.	Nation	Player
—	MF	GRE	Giorgos Koudas (captain)
—	MF	GRE	Stavros Sarafis
—	MF	GRE	Christos Terzanidis
—	MF	GRE	Vasilis Lazos
—	MF	GRE	Thomas Dramalis
—	FW	GRE	Achilleas Aslanidis
—	FW	GRE	Dimitris Paridis
—	FW	GRE	Giannis Mantzourakis
—	FW	GRE	Dimitris Stavridis
—	FW	GRE	Stelios Poulasouchidis
—	FW	GRE	Giorgos Stergiadis

== Transfers ==
Players transferred in

Transfer window	Pos.	Name	Club	Fee
Summer	GK	(Greece) Savvas Chatzioannou	(United States) N.Y. Greek American Atlas	Free
Summer	DF	(Greece) Kostas Vergos	(Greece) Olympiacos	?
Summer	DF	(Greece) Michalis Bellis	(Greece) Panachaiki	Free
Summer	DF	(Greece) Ioannis Gounaris	(Greece) Doxa Neapoli	?
Summer	FW	(Greece) Dimitris Stavridis	(Greece) Doxa Neapoli	?
Summer	FW	(Greece) Stelios Poulasouchidis	(Greece) Aris Ptolemaida	?
Summer	FW	(Greece) Giannis Mantzourakis	(Romania) Rapid București	Free

Players transferred out

Transfer window	Pos.	Name	Club	Fee
Summer	MF	(Greece) Giannis Giakoumis	(Greece) Naoussa	Free
Summer	MF	(Greece) Toulis Mouratidis	(Greece) Naoussa	Free
Summer	FW	(Greece) Anestis Afentoulidis	(Greece) Kastoria	Free

== Pre-season ==
Win Draw Loss

30 August 1970 Friendly	PAOK	1–1	Olympiacos	Thessaloniki
	Mantzourakis 69' (pen.)		Gioutsos 19'	Stadium: Toumba Stadium; Attendance: 20,309

6 September 1970 Friendly	Olympiacos	1–3	PAOK	Piraeus
	Gaitatzis 67'		Koudas 14'; Mantzourakis 50'; Dramalis 73'	Stadium: Karaiskakis Stadium

9 September 1970 Friendly	PAOK	1–0	New York Greek American Atlas	Thessaloniki
	Mantzourakis 68'			Stadium: Toumba Stadium

== Competitions ==
=== Overview ===
Competition	Record							
Competition	Pld	W	D	L	GF	GA	GD	Win %
Alpha Ethniki	34	12	10	12	38	32	+6	35.29
Greek Cup	5	4	0	1	15	8	+7	80.00
Inter-Cities Fairs Cup	2	1	0	1	1	5	−4	50.00
Total	41	17	10	14	54	45	+9	41.46

Source: Competitions

=== Managerial statistics ===
Head coach	From	To	Record							
Head coach	From	To	G	W	D	L	GF	GA	GD	Win %
(Socialist Federal Republic of Yugoslavia) Ivica Horvat	Start of season	03.01.1971	16	6	4	6	18	18	+0	37.50
(Greece) Giorgos Chasiotis (Interim)	11.01.1971	07.02.1971	5	1	2	2	1	4	−3	20.00
(England) Les Shannon	13.02.1971	End of season	20	10	4	6	35	23	+12	50.00

== Alpha Ethniki ==
=== Standings ===
Pos	Team	Pld	W	D	L	GF	GA	GD	Pts	Qualification or relegation
6	Apollon Athens	34	12	13	9	30	27	+3	71	
7	Olympiacos	34	13	11	10	44	24	+20	71	Qualification for Cup Winners' Cup first round
8	PAOK	34	12	10	12	38	32	+6	68	
9	Ethnikos Piraeus	34	10	14	10	45	37	+8	68	
10	Aris	34	10	13	11	45	39	+6	67	

Source: RSSSF
Rules for classification: 1st points; 2nd decision match; 3rd head-to-head goal difference.

==== Results summary ====
Overall								Home						Away					
Pld	W	D	L	GF	GA	GD	Pts	W	D	L	GF	GA	GD	W	D	L	GF	GA	GD
34	12	10	12	38	32	+6	46	9	6	2	27	13	+14	3	4	10	11	19	−8

Last updated: 13 June 1971.
Source: Competitive matches

==== Results by round ====
Round	1	2	3	4	5	6	7	8	9	10	11	12	13	14	15	16	17	18	19	20	21	22	23	24	25	26	27	28	29	30	31	32	33	34
Ground	A	A	H	A	A	H	A	H	H	H	H	H	A	H	H	A	A	H	H	A	H	H	A	H	A	A	A	A	A	H	A	A	H	H
Result	D	L	W	L	L	L	L	W	W	D	W	W	D	D	D	L	L	W	D	D	D	W	W	D	W	L	W	D	L	L	L	L	W	W
Position	12	15	6	12	15	16	16	14	12	11	9	9	9	9	8	9	10	8	9	9	9	8	8	8	8	8	7	7	7	9	10	11	10	8

Source: League matches
A = Away; H = Home; W = Win; D = Draw; L = Loss

==== Matches ====
Win Draw Loss

20 September 1970 1	Ethnikos Piraeus	0–0	PAOK	Piraeus
				Stadium: Karaiskakis Stadium; Attendance: 22,021

27 September 1970 2	AEK Athens	2–0	PAOK	Athens
	Pomonis 63'; Nikolaidis 78'			Stadium: Nikos Goumas Stadium; Attendance: 29,406; Referee: Papavasiliou

4 October 1970 3	PAOK	6–3	Proodeftiki	Thessaloniki
	Mantzourakis 1', 72'; Koudas 15'; Paridis 26'; Sarafis 43'; Glezos 61' (o.g.)		Kallis 19'; Glezos 40'; Roubanis 65'	Stadium: Toumba Stadium; Attendance: 9,530

18 October 1970 5	Panionios	3–1	PAOK	Athens
	Lagos 4', 82'; Intzoglou 87'		Koudas 21'; Vergos (red card) 86'	Stadium: Nea Smyrni Stadium; Attendance: 11,809

25 October 1970 6	PAOK	0–1	Iraklis	Thessaloniki
	Sarafis (penalty missed) 87'		Nikoloudis 31'	Stadium: Toumba Stadium; Attendance: 17,923; Referee: Famelis

1 November 1970 7	Veria	1–0	PAOK	Veria
	Michailidis 21'			Stadium: Veria Stadium; Attendance: 8,506

4 November 1970 4	Aris	1–0	PAOK	Thessaloniki
	Papaioannou 27'			Stadium: Kleanthis Vikelidis Stadium; Attendance: 16,475; Referee: Papavasiliou
Note: Part of Matchday 4 was rescheduled because the Greece National team was playing a European Championship qualifier away at Malta and the big clubs had many international call-ups.

8 November 1970 8	PAOK	3–1	EPA Larnaca	Thessaloniki
	Paridis 11'; Stavridis 40', 75'		Konstantas 68'	Stadium: Toumba Stadium

15 November 1970 9	PAOK	1–0	Egaleo	Thessaloniki
	Koudas 24'			Stadium: Toumba Stadium; Referee: Giarenis

29 November 1970 10	PAOK	1–1	Panserraikos	Thessaloniki
	Aslanidis 68'		Bitzidis 85'	Stadium: Toumba Stadium

6 December 1970 11	PAOK	2–0	OFI	Thessaloniki
	Koudas 20'; Paridis 65'			Stadium: Toumba Stadium; Attendance: 9,932; Referee: Eleftheriadis

20 December 1970 12	PAOK	3–0	Fostiras	Thessaloniki
	Sarafis 26', 44'; Stavridis 64'			Stadium: Toumba Stadium; Attendance: 10,454

27 December 1970 13	Pierikos	0–0	PAOK	Katerini
	Traganos (red card) 27'		Paridis (red card) 27'	Stadium: Katerini Stadium; Referee: Famelis

3 January 1971 14	PAOK	0–0	Olympiacos	Thessaloniki
				Stadium: Toumba Stadium; Attendance: 25,462; Referee: Christos Michas (Athens)

11 January 1971 15	PAOK	0–0	Apollon Athens	Thessaloniki
				Stadium: Toumba Stadium; Attendance: 9,587; Referee: Marinos

17 January 1971 16	Panathinaikos	3–0	PAOK	Athens
	Chatziandreou 8', 31'; Domazos 60'			Stadium: Leoforos Stadium; Attendance: 18,730

24 January 1971 17	Kavala	1–0	PAOK	Kavala
	Machairidis 67'			Stadium: Kavala Stadium

31 January 1971 18	PAOK	1–0	Ethnikos Piraeus	Thessaloniki
	Koudas 58'			Stadium: Toumba Stadium; Attendance: 21,919; Referee: Panakis

7 February 1971 19	PAOK	0–0	AEK Athens	Thessaloniki
				Stadium: Toumba Stadium; Attendance: 25,660; Referee: Papavasiliou

13 February 1971 20	Proodeftiki	1–1	PAOK	Piraeus
	Spetsarias 53'		Koudas 49'	Stadium: Karaiskakis Stadium

21 February 1971 21	PAOK	2–2	Aris	Thessaloniki
	Stavridis 14'; Aslanidis 83'		Papaioannou 17'; Alexiadis 41'	Stadium: Toumba Stadium; Attendance: 29,890; Referee: Kougias

7 March 1971 22	PAOK	3–1	Panionios	Thessaloniki
	Lazos 17'; Aslanidis 30', 76'		Dedes 16'	Stadium: Toumba Stadium; Attendance: 24,307

14 March 1971 23	Iraklis	0–4	PAOK	Thessaloniki
			Aslanidis 52', 85' (pen.); Paridis 70'; Stavridis 87'	Stadium: Kaftanzoglio Stadium; Attendance: 32,340

21 March 1971 24	PAOK	0–0	Veria	Thessaloniki
				Stadium: Toumba Stadium; Attendance: 19,000

28 March 1971 25	EPA Larnaca	1–2	PAOK	Nicosia
	Konstantinou 18'		Aslanidis 52'; Koudas 66'	Stadium: Old GSP Stadium

4 April 1971 26	Egaleo	1–0	PAOK	Athens
	Zanteroglou 75'			Stadium: Stavros Mavrothalassitis Stadium; Attendance: 7,274

11 April 1971 27	Panserraikos	0–1	PAOK	Serres
			Terzanidis 36'	Stadium: Serres Municipal Stadium; Attendance: 7,765

25 April 1971 28	OFI	2–2	PAOK	Heraklion
	Vouzounerakis 18' (pen.), 71'		Mantzourakis 41' (pen.); Sarafis 68'	Stadium: Theodoros Vardinogiannis Stadium; Referee: Christos Michas (Athens)

2 May 1971 29	Fostiras	1–0	PAOK	Athens
	Remoundos 58'			Stadium: Tavros Stadium

16 May 1971 30	PAOK	1–2	Pierikos	Thessaloniki
	Sarafis 32'		Liapis 23'; Pantazis 44'	Stadium: Toumba Stadium; Referee: Kougias

23 May 1971 31	Olympiacos	1–0	PAOK	Piraeus
	Synetopoulos 68'			Stadium: Karaiskakis Stadium; Attendance: 34,960

30 May 1971 32	Apollon Athens	1–0	PAOK	Athens
	Dimopoulos 61'			Stadium: Rizoupoli Stadium; Attendance: 2,979

6 June 1971 33	PAOK	3–2	Panathinaikos	Thessaloniki
	Aslanidis 66'; Stavridis 70', 76'		Antoniadis 17', 50'	Stadium: Toumba Stadium; Attendance: 18,452

13 June 1971 34	PAOK	1–0	Kavala	Thessaloniki
	Aslanidis 23'			Stadium: Toumba Stadium

== Greek Cup ==
=== Round of 32 ===
28 February 1971	Kallithea	0–2	PAOK	Piraeus
			Aslanidis 13'; Paridis 49'	Stadium: Karaiskakis Stadium; Referee: Dikopoulos

=== Round of 16 ===
31 March 1971	PAOK	6–1	Trikala	Thessaloniki
	Mantzourakis 17', 58', 67'; Aslanidis 35'; Paridis 52'; Koudas 85'		Sinatkas 64'	Stadium: Toumba Stadium; Attendance: 8,695; Referee: Protonotarios

=== Quarter-finals ===
5 May 1971	PAOK	3–2	Panathinaikos	Thessaloniki
	Sarafis 58'; Vlachos 59' (o.g.); Paridis 61'		Domazos 36'; Tomaras 53'	Stadium: Toumba Stadium

=== Semi-finals ===
26 May 1971	PAOK	3–2	AEK Athens	Thessaloniki
	Aslanidis 40', 61'; Paridis 43'		Nikolaidis 28'; Papaemmanouil 56'	Stadium: Toumba Stadium; Attendance: 28,815; Referee: Christos Michas (Athens)

=== Final ===
9 June 1971	Olympiacos	3–1	PAOK	Piraeus
20:30 EEST	Angelis 18'; Gioutsos 43'; Pamboullis 82'		Sarafis 46'	Stadium: Karaiskakis Stadium; Referee: Christos Michas (Athens)

== Inter-Cities Fairs Cup ==
=== First round ===
16 September 1970 1st leg	Dinamo București (Romania)	5–0	(Greece) PAOK	Bucharest, Romania
	Dumitrache 8', 49', 73'; Popescu 64', 83'	Report	Bellis (red card) 69'	Stadium: Stadionul Național; Attendance: 20,000; Referee: Sándor Petri (Hungary)

30 September 1970 2nd leg	PAOK (Greece)	1–0 (1–5 agg.)	(Romania) Dinamo București	Thessaloniki, Greece
	Koudas 80'	Report		Stadium: Toumba Stadium; Attendance: 12,171; Referee: Sergio Gonella (Italy)

== Statistics ==
=== Squad statistics ===
As of June 13, 1971

Appearances denote players in the starting lineup, with the numbers in parentheses denoting appearances as substitute.

No.	Name	Alpha Ethniki		Greek Cup		Inter-Cities Fairs Cup		Total	
No.	Name	Apps	Goals	Apps	Goals	Apps	Goals	Apps	Goals
Goalkeepers
	(Greece) Savvas Chatzioannou	22	0	5	0	0	0	27	0
	(Greece) Stelios Christodoulou	10	0	0	0	2	0	12	0
	(Greece) Apostolos Savvoulidis	3	0	0	0	0	0	3	0
	(Greece) Kostas Pirtsos	0	0	0	0	1	0	1	0
Defenders
	(Greece) Ioannis Gounaris	32	0	5	0	2	0	39	0
	(Greece) Pavlos Papadopoulos	28	0	5	0	2	0	35	0
	(Greece) Aristos Fountoukidis	29	0	4	0	1	0	34	0
	(Greece) Ioannis Chatziantoniou	26	0	5	0	0	0	31	0
	(Greece) Michalis Bellis	22	0	4	0	1	0	27	0
	(Greece) Kostas Vergos	10	0	1	0	1	0	12	0
	(Greece) Giorgos Kontogiorgos	8	0	0	0	1	0	9	0
	(Greece) Giorgos Makris	4	0	0	0	0	0	4	0
	(Greece) Giorgos Papachristoudis	3	0	0	0	1	0	4	0
Midfielders
	(Greece) Giorgos Koudas	30	7	4	1	2	1	36	9
	(Greece) Stavros Sarafis	26	5	4	2	2	0	32	7
	(Greece) Christos Terzanidis	24	1	4	0	0	0	28	1
	(Greece) Vasilis Lazos	23	1	4	0	0	0	27	1
	(Greece) Thomas Dramalis	1	0	0	0	2	0	3	0
Forwards
	(Greece) Achilleas Aslanidis	33	9	5	4	1	0	39	13
	(Greece) Dimitris Paridis	29	4	5	4	2	0	36	8
	(Greece) Dimitris Stavridis	25	7	4	0	0	0	29	7
	(Greece) Giannis Mantzourakis	20	3	3	3	2	0	25	6
	(Greece) Stelios Poulasouchidis	4	0	0	0	0	0	4	0
	(Greece) Giorgos Stergiadis	1	0	0	0	0	0	1	0

Source: Match reports in competitive matches, RSSSF

=== Goalscorers ===
Rank	No.	Pos.	Player	Alpha Ethniki	Greek Cup	Inter-Cities Fairs Cup	Total
1		FW	(Greece) Achilleas Aslanidis	9	4	0	13
2		MF	(Greece) Giorgos Koudas	7	1	1	9
3		FW	(Greece) Dimitris Paridis	4	4	0	8
4		FW	(Greece) Dimitris Stavridis	7	0	0	7
4		MF	(Greece) Stavros Sarafis	5	2	0	7
6		FW	(Greece) Giannis Mantzourakis	3	3	0	6
7		MF	(Greece) Christos Terzanidis	1	0	0	1
7		MF	(Greece) Vasilis Lazos	1	0	0	1
Own goals				1	1	0	2
TOTALS				38	15	1	54

Source: Match reports in competitive matches, RSSSF
