= 1972–73 PAOK FC season =

PAOK
1972–73 season
- President: Stratos Simitzis
- Manager: Les Shannon
- Stadium: Toumba Stadium
- Alpha Ethniki: Runners-up
- Greek Cup: Runners-up
- UEFA Cup Winners' Cup: First round
- Top goalscorer: League: Stavros Sarafis (19); All: Stavros Sarafis (25)
- Highest home attendance: 44,486 vs Aris

The 1972–73 season was PAOK Football Club's 47th in existence and the club's 14th consecutive season in the top flight of Greek football. The team entered the Greek Football Cup in first round, and also faced Rapid Wien in the UEFA Cup Winners' Cup first round.

== Players ==
=== Squad ===
Note: Flags indicate national team as defined under FIFA eligibility rules; some limited exceptions apply. Players may hold more than one non-FIFA nationality.

No.	Pos.	Nation	Player
—	GK	GRE	Ioannis Stefas
—	GK	GRE	Savvas Chatzioannou
—	GK	GRE	Apostolos Savvoulidis
—	DF	GRE	Kostas Iosifidis
—	DF	GRE	Ioannis Gounaris
—	DF	GRE	Aristos Fountoukidis
—	DF	GRE	Pavlos Papadopoulos
—	DF	GRE	Michalis Bellis
—	DF	GRE	Ioannis Chatziantoniou
—	DF	GRE	Babis Tsilingiridis
—	DF	GRE	Filotas Pellios

No.	Pos.	Nation	Player
—	MF	GRE	Giorgos Koudas (captain)
—	MF	GRE	Koulis Apostolidis
—	MF	GRE	Stavros Sarafis
—	MF	GRE	Christos Terzanidis
—	MF	GRE	Vasilis Lazos
—	MF	GRE	Georgios Paraschos
—	FW	GRE	Achilleas Aslanidis
—	FW	GRE	Dimitris Paridis
—	FW	GRE	Giannis Mantzourakis
—	FW	GRE	Petros Vouzounerakis
—	FW	GRE	Lefteris Tsakiropoulos
—	FW	GRE	Dimitris Stavridis

== Transfers ==
Players transferred in

Transfer Window	Pos.	Name	Club	Fee
Summer	GK	(Greece) Ioannis Stefas	(Greece) Korinthos	?
Summer	DF	(Greece) Babis Tsilingiridis	(Greece) Xanthi	1 million Dr.
Summer	FW	(Greece) Petros Vouzounerakis	(Greece) OFI	?

== Pre-season ==
Win Draw Loss

20 August 1972 Friendly	Kozani	2–2	PAOK	Kozani
	Poimenidis 1', 67'		Apostolidis 27'; Vouzounerakis 83'

23 August 1972 Friendly	Edessaikos	1–4	PAOK	Edessa
	Doupkaris 56'		Paridis 24', 62'; Terzanidis 29'; Apostolidis 79'	Referee: Doumousiaris

24 August 1972 Friendly	Aris Ptolemaida	1–3	PAOK	Ptolemaida
	Tangalidis 12'		Sarafis 19'; Aslanidis 35' (pen.); Paridis 56'

25 August 1972 Friendly	Lassani	0–4	PAOK	Kozani
			Vouzounerakis 25'; Lazos 32'; Paridis 40', 51'

29 August 1972 Friendly	PAOK	1–3	MTK	Thessaloniki
	Aslanidis 12' (pen.)		Kunszt 5'; Becsei 50'; Dunai 53'	Stadium: Toumba Stadium

31 August 1972 Friendly	Olympiacos	1–2	PAOK	Piraeus
	Papadimitriou 40' (pen.)		Paridis 47'; Vouzounerakis 59'	Stadium: Karaiskakis Stadium; Referee: Levogiannis

7 September 1972 Friendly	PAOK	2–0	Komlói Bányász SK	Thessaloniki
	Koudas 47'; Vouzounerakis 85'			Stadium: Toumba Stadium; Referee: Pyloridis

9 September 1972 Friendly	PAOK	3–1	Xanthi	Thessaloniki
	Aslanidis 6'; Koudas 48'; Sarafis 69'		Mourtzas 16'	Stadium: Toumba Stadium

== Competitions ==
=== Overview ===
Competition	Record							
Competition	Pld	W	D	L	GF	GA	GD	Win %
Alpha Ethniki	34	27	4	3	75	24	+51	79.41
Greek Cup	6	5	0	1	15	5	+10	83.33
UEFA Cup Winners' Cup	2	0	2	0	2	2	+0	0.00
Total	42	32	6	4	92	31	+61	76.19

Source: Competitions

== Alpha Ethniki ==
=== Standings ===
Pos	Team	Pld	W	D	L	GF	GA	GD	Pts	Qualification or relegation
1	Olympiacos (C)	34	27	6	1	72	13	+59	94	Qualification for European Cup first round
2	PAOK	34	27	4	3	75	24	+51	92	Qualification for Cup Winners' Cup first round (Note: Since Olympiacos, winners of 1972–73 Greek Football Cup, was qualified for the 1973–74 European Cup, losing cup finalists PAOK earned a spot in the first round of the 1973–74 European Cup Winners' Cup.)
3	Panathinaikos (Note: Panathinaikos were deducted 3 points and had 3 games penalty.)	34	22	7	5	89	29	+60	82	Qualification for UEFA Cup first round
4	Panachaiki	34	16	12	6	42	27	+15	78	Qualification for UEFA Cup first round
5	AEK Athens	34	13	11	10	39	36	+3	71	

Source: RSSSF
Rules for classification: 1st points; 2nd decision match; 3rd head-to-head goal difference.
(C) Champions

==== Results summary ====
Overall								Home						Away					
Pld	W	D	L	GF	GA	GD	Pts	W	D	L	GF	GA	GD	W	D	L	GF	GA	GD
34	27	4	3	75	24	+51	85	15	1	1	40	11	+29	12	3	2	35	13	+22

Last updated: 3 June 1973.
Source: Competitive matches

==== Results by round ====
Round	1	2	3	4	5	6	7	8	9	10	11	12	13	14	15	16	17	18	19	20	21	22	23	24	25	26	27	28	29	30	31	32	33	34
Ground	H	A	H	H	A	H	A	H	A	H	A	A	H	A	H	A	H	A	H	A	A	H	A	H	A	H	A	H	H	A	H	Α	H	Α
Result	W	W	W	W	D	W	W	W	W	D	D	W	W	W	W	W	W	W	W	L	L	W	W	W	W	W	W	L	W	W	W	D	W	W
Position	3	2	1	1	1	1	1	1	1	1	1	1	1	1	1	1	1	1	1	1	2	2	2	2	2	2	2	2	2	2	2	2	2	2

Source: League matches
A = Away; H = Home; W = Win; D = Draw; L = Loss

==== Matches ====
Win Draw Loss

17 September 1972 1	PAOK	3–1	Omonia	Thessaloniki
	Sarafis 15'; Apostolidis 82'; Aslanidis 90'		Charalampous 3'	Stadium: Toumba Stadium

24 September 1972 2	Trikala	0–1	PAOK	Trikala
			Koudas 44'	Stadium: Trikala Municipal Stadium

1 October 1972 3	PAOK	1–0	Olympiacos	Thessaloniki
	Aslanidis (red card) 54'; Gounaris 56'			Stadium: Toumba Stadium; Attendance: 42,150; Referee: Komninakis

8 October 1972 4	PAOK	3–0	Fostiras	Thessaloniki
	Koudas 12', 85'; Vouzounerakis 25'			Stadium: Toumba Stadium

22 October 1972 5	Egaleo	2–2	PAOK	Athens
	Stavropoulos 14', 36'		Koudas 44', 82'	Stadium: Stavros Mavrothalassitis Stadium

29 October 1972 6	PAOK	1–0	Panathinaikos	Thessaloniki
	Koudas 38'			Stadium: Toumba Stadium; Attendance: 39,500; Referee: Latsios

5 November 1972 7	Ethnikos Piraeus	2–3	PAOK	Piraeus
	Kremmydas 3'; Kritikopoulos 89'		Aslanidis 11'; Fountoukidis 14'; Sarafis 25'	Stadium: Karaiskakis Stadium; Attendance: 23,070; Referee: Kougias

12 November 1972 8	PAOK	4–1	Iraklis	Thessaloniki
	Koudas 44'; Aslanidis 56'; Fountoukidis 76'; Sarafis 83'		Gesios 85'	Stadium: Toumba Stadium; Attendance: 34,902; Referee: Zlatanos

26 November 1972 9	Atromitos	0–2	PAOK	Athens
			Sarafis 1'; Apostolidis 20'	Stadium: Peristeri Stadium; Referee: Papavassiliou

3 December 1972 10	PAOK	0–0	AEK Athens	Thessaloniki
				Stadium: Toumba Stadium; Attendance: 39,554; Referee: Marinos

10 December 1972 11	Panachaiki	2–2	PAOK	Patras
	Davourlis 29'; Michalopoulos 42'		Sarafis 27'; Koudas 59'	Stadium: Kostas Davourlis Stadium; Referee: Armodoros

17 December 1972 12	Kavala	0–2	PAOK	Kavala
	Kopsachilis (penalty missed) 65'		Apostolidis 43'; Aslanidis 82'	Stadium: Kavala Stadium; Attendance: 18,169

24 December 1972 13	PAOK	2–1	Panserraikos	Thessaloniki
	Koudas 9', 73'		Zarzopoulos 63'	Stadium: Toumba Stadium; Attendance: 19,076; Referee: Latsios

31 December 1972 14	Kalamata	0–3	PAOK	Kalamata
			Fountoukidis 32'; Apostolidis 77', 80'	Stadium: Kalamata Municipal Stadium

7 January 1973 15	PAOK	2–1	Panionios	Thessaloniki
	Sarafis 18'; Aslanidis 90' (pen.)		Lagos 39'	Stadium: Toumba Stadium; Referee: Karvelis

21 January 1973 16	Olympiacos Volos	1–5	PAOK	Volos
	Valachas 43'		Fountoukidis 1'; Sarafis 27', 52'; Apostolidis 67'; Gounaris 82'	Stadium: Volos Municipal Stadium; Attendance: 9,866; Referee: Nanos

28 January 1973 17	PAOK	1–0	Aris	Thessaloniki
	Sarafis 41'			Stadium: Toumba Stadium; Attendance: 44,486; Referee: Alexopoulos

4 February 1973 18	Omonia	1–3	PAOK	Nicosia
	Mouskos 38'		Apostolidis 5'; Aslanidis 55'; Koudas 86'	Stadium: GSP Stadium (1902); Attendance: 11,205; Referee: Pagourtzis

11 February 1973 19	PAOK	4–0	Trikala	Thessaloniki
	Koudas 41'; Apostolidis 67', 72'; Sarafis 70'			Stadium: Toumba Stadium; Attendance: 17,134; Referee: Tsagarousianos

25 February 1973 20	Olympiacos	1–0	PAOK	Piraeus
	Losada 75'			Stadium: Karaiskakis Stadium; Attendance: 41,052; Referee: Fakis

4 March 1973 21	Fostiras	1–0	PAOK	Athens
	Remoundos 67'			Stadium: Tavros Stadium

11 March 1973 22	PAOK	4–1	Egaleo	Thessaloniki
	Sarafis 10', 28'; Apostolidis 11'; Koudas 58'		Tsalamangas 48'	Stadium: Toumba Stadium

18 March 1973 23	Panathinaikos	0–2 (w/o)	PAOK	Athens
				Stadium: Leoforos Stadium
Note: Panathinaikos were sentenced with a two-match penalty after the eventful derby against Olympiacos on matchday 22 (suspended at 82nd minute). The two teams played a friendly game which ended 3–3.

26 March 1973 24	PAOK	3–0	Ethnikos Piraeus	Thessaloniki
	Apostolidis 2'; Sarafis 13', 65'			Stadium: Toumba Stadium

1 April 1973 25	Iraklis	1–3	PAOK	Thessaloniki
	Koutroubelis 2'		Sarafis 8'; Apostolidis 30'; Paridis 79'	Stadium: Kaftanzoglio Stadium

8 April 1973 26	PAOK	2–1	Atromitos	Thessaloniki
	Sarafis 38', 87'		Tsivgoulis 64'	Stadium: Toumba Stadium

15 April 1973 27	AEK Athens	0–2	PAOK	Athens
			Sarafis 48'; Apostolidis 51'	Stadium: Nikos Goumas Stadium; Attendance: 29,654

22 April 1973 28	PAOK	3–5	Panachaiki	Thessaloniki
	Paridis 41', 64'; Sarafis 89' (pen.)		Davourlis 30', 61', 82'; Stravopodis 47'; Pappas 87'	Stadium: Toumba Stadium; Attendance: 32,015; Referee: Armodoros

30 April 1973 29	PAOK	3–0	Kavala	Thessaloniki
	Lazos 48'; Apostolidis 54'; Paridis 74'			Stadium: Toumba Stadium

6 May 1973 30	Panserraikos	1–3	PAOK	Serres
	Balabanidis 90'		Aslanidis 9' (pen.); Koudas 80'; Terzanidis 89'	Stadium: Serres Municipal Stadium; Attendance: 11,049

13 May 1973 31	PAOK	3–0	Kalamata	Thessaloniki
	Paridis 44' (pen.), 60', 90'			Stadium: Toumba Stadium

20 May 1973 32	Panionios	0–0	PAOK	Athens
				Stadium: Nea Smyrni Stadium; Attendance: 15,844; Referee: Papavassiliou

27 May 1973 33	PAOK	1–0	Olympiacos Volos	Thessaloniki
	Apostolidis 8'			Stadium: Toumba Stadium; Attendance: 10,819

3 June 1973 34	Aris	1–2	PAOK	Thessaloniki
	Kapernekas 26' (pen.)		Bellis (red card) 30'; Paridis 36', 86'	Stadium: Kleanthis Vikelidis Stadium; Attendance: 22,648; Referee: Vamvakopoulos

== Greek Cup ==
=== First round ===
6 December 1972	Anagennisi Epanomi	0–3	PAOK	Thessaloniki
			Koudas 40'; Aslanidis 44'; Fountoukidis 65'	Stadium: Kalamaria Stadium

=== Second round ===
3 January 1973	PAOK	5–1	Olympiacos Volos	Thessaloniki
	Aslanidis 12', 24'; Sarafis 50', 58'; Paridis 85'		Papadopoulos 16' (o.g.)	Stadium: Toumba Stadium; Attendance: 5,836

=== Third round ===
7 February 1973	Fostiras	1–2 (a.e.t.)	PAOK	Athens
	Deimezis 83'		Apostolidis 53'; Sarafis 106'	Stadium: Tavros Stadium

=== Quarter–finals ===
18 April 1973	PAOK	2–0	Panathinaikos	Thessaloniki
	Paridis 26', 34'			Stadium: Toumba Stadium

=== Semi–finals ===
23 May 1973	PAOK	3–2 (a.e.t.)	Ethnikos Piraeus	Thessaloniki
	Sarafis 57', 112'; Terzanidis 98'		Kritikopoulos 30'; Moutafis 119'	Stadium: Toumba Stadium; Referee: Kougias

=== Final ===
17 June 1973	Olympiacos	1–0	PAOK	Piraeus
	Angelis 46'			Stadium: Karaiskakis Stadium; Attendance: 40,070; Referee: Vital Loraux (Belgium)

== UEFA Cup Winners' Cup ==
=== First round ===
12 September 1972 1st leg	Rapid Wien (Austria)	0–0	(Greece) PAOK	Wienna, Austria
		Report		Stadium: Prater stadion Referee: Francesco Francescon (Italy)

26 September 1972 2nd leg	PAOK (Greece)	2–2 (2–2 (a) agg.)	(Austria) Rapid Wien	Thessaloniki, Greece
	Sarafis 32' (pen.); Koudas (red card) 79'; Aslanidis 90'	Report	Gallos 23'; Krankl 43'	Stadium: Toumba Stadium; Attendance: 32,420; Referee: Károly Palotai (Hungary)

== Statistics ==
=== Squad statistics ===
As of June 18, 1973

Appearances denote players in the starting lineup, with the numbers in parentheses denoting appearances as substitute.

No.	Name	Alpha Ethniki		Greek Cup		UEFA CWC		Total	
No.	Name	Apps	Goals	Apps	Goals	Apps	Goals	Apps	Goals
Goalkeepers
	(Greece) Ioannis Stefas	24	0	5	0	1	0	30	0
	(Greece) Savvas Chatzioannou	7	0	0	0	0	0	7	0
	(Greece) Apostolos Savvoulidis	4	0	1	0	1	0	6	0
Defenders
	(Greece) Ioannis Gounaris	32	2	6	0	2	0	40	2
	(Greece) Aristos Fountoukidis	29	4	6	1	2	0	37	5
	(Greece) Pavlos Papadopoulos	27	0	4	0	2	0	33	0
	(Greece) Kostas Iosifidis	25	0	5	0	2	0	32	0
	(Greece) Michalis Bellis	19	0	2	0	1	0	22	0
	(Greece) Ioannis Chatziantoniou	18	0	2	0	0	0	20	0
	(Greece) Babis Tsilingiridis	10	0	2	0	0	0	12	0
	(Greece) Filotas Pellios	3	0	1	0	0	0	4	0
Midfielders
	(Greece) Koulis Apostolidis	33	15	5	1	2	0	40	16
	(Greece) Giorgos Koudas	31	14	5	1	1	0	37	15
	(Greece) Christos Terzanidis	29	1	6	1	2	0	37	2
	(Greece) Stavros Sarafis	28	19	6	5	1	1	35	25
	(Greece) Vasilis Lazos	17	1	5	0	1	0	23	1
	(Greece) Georgios Paraschos	6	0	0	0	0	0	6	0
Forwards
	(Greece) Achilleas Aslanidis	27	7	6	3	2	1	35	11
	(Greece) Dimitris Paridis	22	9	6	3	2	0	30	12
	(Greece) Giannis Mantzourakis	6	0	2	0	0	0	8	0
	(Greece) Petros Vouzounerakis	4	1	0	0	0	0	4	1
	(Greece) Lefteris Tsakiropoulos	3	0	0	0	0	0	3	0
	(Greece) Dimitris Stavridis	1	0	0	0	0	0	1	0

Source: Match reports in competitive matches, RSSSF

=== Goalscorers ===
Rank	No.	Pos.	Player	Alpha Ethniki	Greek Cup	UEFA CWC	Total
1		MF	(Greece) Stavros Sarafis	19	5	1	25
2		MF	(Greece) Koulis Apostolidis	15	1	0	16
3		MF	(Greece) Giorgos Koudas	14	1	0	15
4		FW	(Greece) Dimitris Paridis	9	3	0	12
5		FW	(Greece) Achilleas Aslanidis	7	3	1	11
6		DF	(Greece) Aristos Fountoukidis	4	1	0	5
7		DF	(Greece) Ioannis Gounaris	2	0	0	2
7		MF	(Greece) Christos Terzanidis	1	1	0	2
9		FW	(Greece) Petros Vouzounerakis	1	0	0	1
9		MF	(Greece) Vasilis Lazos	1	0	0	1
Walkover				2	0	0	2
TOTALS				75	15	2	92

Source: Match reports in competitive matches, RSSSF
