= 1969–70 PAOK FC season =

PAOK
1969–70 season
- President: Stavros Georgiadis
- Manager: Jenő Csaknády
- Stadium: Toumba Stadium
- Alpha Ethniki: 5th
- Greek Cup: Runners-up
- Top goalscorer: League: Stavros Sarafis (17); All: Stavros Sarafis (21)
- Highest home attendance: 35,740 vs Olympiacos

The 1969–70 season was PAOK Football Club's 44th in existence and the club's 11th consecutive season in the top flight of Greek football. The team entered the Greek Football Cup in second round.

== Players ==
=== Squad ===
Note: Flags indicate national team as defined under FIFA eligibility rules; some limited exceptions apply. Players may hold more than one non-FIFA nationality.

No.	Pos.	Nation	Player
—	GK	GRE	Stelios Christodoulou
—	GK	GRE	Kostas Pirtsos
—	GK	GRE	Kostas Tsamoutis
—	DF	GRE	Aristos Fountoukidis
—	DF	GRE	Emilios Theofanidis
—	DF	GRE	Giorgos Papachristoudis
—	DF	GRE	Giorgos Makris
—	DF	GRE	Giorgos Kontogiorgos
—	DF	GRE	Pavlos Papadopoulos
—	DF	GRE	Nikos Mitrakas
—	DF	GRE	Christos Katsikaris
—	DF	GRE	Odysseas Oikonomou

No.	Pos.	Nation	Player
—	MF	GRE	Giorgos Koudas (captain)
—	MF	GRE	Stavros Sarafis
—	MF	GRE	Christos Terzanidis
—	MF	GRE	Toulis Mouratidis
—	MF	GRE	Giannis Giakoumis
—	MF	GRE	Vasilis Lazos
—	MF	GRE	Thomas Dramalis
—	FW	GRE	Anestis Afentoulidis
—	FW	GRE	Dimitris Paridis
—	FW	GRE	Achilleas Aslanidis
—	FW	GRE	Alexandros Laridis
—	FW	GRE	Giorgos Stergiadis

== Transfers ==
Players transferred out

Transfer Window	Pos.	Name	Club	Fee
Summer	MF	(Greece) Pavlos Siantsis	(Greece) Kastoria	Loan

== Pre-season ==
Win Draw Loss

15 August 1969 Friendly	Rodos	1–4	PAOK	Rhodes
	Charalampis 70'		Lazos 40', 43' (pen.); Koudas 57'; Terzanidis 68'	Stadium: Diagoras Stadium; Referee: Xanthos

7 September 1969 Friendly	PAOK	4–0	Panionios	Thessaloniki
	Koudas; Afentoulidis; Sarafis			Stadium: Kaftanzoglio Stadium

12 September 1969 Friendly	PAOK	4–2	Kitwe United	Thessaloniki
	Stergiadis 6', 51'; 43'; 62'		19'; 72'	Stadium: Kaftanzoglio Stadium; Referee: Zlatanos
Note: PAOK used substitute and reserve squad players.

== Competitions ==
=== Overview ===
Competition	Record							
Competition	Pld	W	D	L	GF	GA	GD	Win %
Alpha Ethniki	34	12	17	5	52	25	+27	35.29
Greek Cup	5	4	0	1	11	2	+9	80.00
Total	39	16	17	6	63	27	+36	41.03

Source: Competitions

== Alpha Ethniki ==
=== Standings ===
Pos	Team	Pld	W	D	L	GF	GA	GD	Pts	Qualification or relegation
3	Olympiacos	34	21	8	5	52	21	+31	84	
4	Aris	34	20	7	7	47	15	+32	81	Qualification for Cup Winners' Cup first round
5	PAOK	34	12	17	5	52	25	+27	75	Invitation for Inter-Cities Fairs Cup first round
6	Iraklis	34	14	12	8	37	31	+6	74	
7	Pierikos	34	13	11	10	45	44	+1	71	

Source: RSSSF
Rules for classification: 1st points; 2nd decision match; 3rd head-to-head goal difference.

==== Results summary ====
Overall								Home						Away					
Pld	W	D	L	GF	GA	GD	Pts	W	D	L	GF	GA	GD	W	D	L	GF	GA	GD
34	12	17	5	52	25	+27	53	10	5	2	37	8	+29	2	12	3	15	17	−2

Last updated: 7 June 1970.
Source: Competitive matches

==== Results by round ====
Round	1	2	3	4	5	6	7	8	9	10	11	12	13	14	15	16	17	18	19	20	21	22	23	24	25	26	27	28	29	30	31	32	33	34
Ground	H	A	A	A	H	A	H	A	A	H	A	A	A	H	A	H	H	A	H	H	H	A	H	A	H	H	A	H	H	H	A	H	A	A
Result	L	D	D	D	W	D	D	L	D	W	D	L	D	D	D	W	D	D	L	W	W	D	D	W	W	W	W	W	W	W	D	D	L	D
Position	12	13	13	12	6	7	7	10	10	8	8	10	10	9	9	7	7	8	9	8	8	7	6	6	6	6	6	6	5	5	5	5	5	5

Source: League matches
A = Away; H = Home; W = Win; D = Draw; L = Loss

==== Matches ====
Win Draw Loss

21 September 1969 1	PAOK	1–2	Olympiacos	Thessaloniki
	Afentoulidis 90' (pen.)		Koumarias 48'; Sideris 89'	Stadium: Toumba Stadium; Attendance: 35,740

28 September 1969 2	Panathinaikos	1–1	PAOK	Athens
	Rokidis 29'		Koudas (red card) 30'; Afentoulidis 45'	Stadium: Leoforos Stadium; Attendance: 22,985; Referee: Papavasiliou

18 October 1969 4	Proodeftiki	1–1	PAOK	Piraeus
	Skoufos 32'		Sarafis 26'	Stadium: Nikaia Municipal Stadium

22 October 1969 3	Pierikos	0–0	PAOK	Katerini
			Afentoulidis (penalty missed) 78'	Stadium: Katerini Stadium; Referee: Dikopoulos
Note: Part of Matchday 3 was rescheduled because the Greek National team was playing a World Cup qualifier against Switzerland and the big clubs had many international call-ups.

26 October 1969 5	PAOK	6–1	Vyzas Megara	Thessaloniki
	Makris 7' (pen.); Sarafis 13', 50', 83' (pen.); Aslanidis 53'; Afentoulidis 76'		Kouvas 74' (pen.)	Stadium: Toumba Stadium; Referee: Mantas

2 November 1969 6	Aris	0–0	PAOK	Thessaloniki
				Stadium: Kleanthis Vikelidis Stadium; Attendance: 15,348; Referee: Xanthoulis

23 November 1969 8	AEK Athens	2–0	PAOK	Athens
	Nikolaidis 13'; Karafeskos 59'			Stadium: Nikos Goumas Stadium; Attendance: 26,042; Referee: Protonotarios

26 November 1969 7	PAOK	1–1	Panachaiki	Thessaloniki
	Papadopoulos 13'		Sideris 49'	Stadium: Toumba Stadium; Referee: Karasoulas
Note: Part of Matchday 7 was rescheduled because the Greek National team was playing a World Cup qualifier away at Romania and the big clubs had many international call-ups.

30 November 1969 9	Olympiacos Volos	0–0	PAOK	Volos
				Stadium: Volos Municipal Stadium; Referee: Panakis

7 December 1969 10	PAOK	5–0	Olympiakos Nicosia	Thessaloniki
	Paridis 12', 55', 77'; Sarafis 24', 71'			Stadium: Toumba Stadium; Attendance: 6,042; Referee: Tsiros

14 December 1969 11	Egaleo	2–2	PAOK	Athens
	Lardas 4'; Stavros Makris 73'		Lazos (penalty missed) 14'; Giorgos Makris 25'; Sarafis 51' (pen.)	Stadium: Stavros Mavrothalassitis Stadium; Attendance: 5,555; Referee: Vamvakopoulos

21 December 1969 12	OFI	3–1	PAOK	Heraklion
	Lemonis 37', 84'; Tsagarakis 48'		Giakoumis 70'	Stadium: Theodoros Vardinogiannis Stadium; Attendance: 4,537; Referee: Christos Michas (Athens)

28 December 1969 13	Kavala	1–1	PAOK	Kavala
	Charalampidis 44'		Koudas 75'	Stadium: Kavala Stadium

4 January 1970 14	PAOK	1–1	Ethnikos Piraeus	Thessaloniki
	Paridis 40'		Kritikopoulos 88'	Stadium: Toumba Stadium

11 January 1970 15	Iraklis	1–1	PAOK	Thessaloniki
	Kasapis 60'		Giakoumis 50'	Stadium: Kaftanzoglio Stadium; Attendance: 21,131

18 January 1970 16	PAOK	3–0	Panserraikos	Thessaloniki
	Koudas 43' (pen.); Afentoulidis 64'; Sarafis 67'			Stadium: Toumba Stadium; Attendance: 17,390

25 January 1970 17	PAOK	0–0	Panionios	Thessaloniki
				Stadium: Toumba Stadium; Attendance: 14,529; Referee: Marinos

1 February 1970 18	Olympiacos	1–1	PAOK	Piraeus
	Delikaris 1'		Afentoulidis 24'	Stadium: Karaiskakis Stadium; Referee: Kyriakidis

8 February 1970 19	PAOK	0–1	Panathinaikos	Thessaloniki
			Grammos 5'	Stadium: Toumba Stadium; Attendance: 33,136; Referee: Marinos

15 February 1970 20	PAOK	3–1	Pierikos	Thessaloniki
	Koudas 32'; Sarafis 59', 70'		Mytilinaios 84'	Stadium: Toumba Stadium; Referee: Papavasiliou

22 February 1970 21	PAOK	3–0	Proodeftiki	Thessaloniki
	Paridis 24', 74'; Koudas 85'			Stadium: Toumba Stadium; Attendance: 12,612; Referee: Rouchotas

1 March 1970 22	Vyzas Megara	2–2	PAOK	Megara
	Kouvas 25' (pen.); Siontis 72'		Sarafis 22'; Afentoulidis 38'	Stadium: Megara Stadium; Referee: Geroukalis

8 March 1970 23	PAOK	0–0	Aris	Thessaloniki
				Stadium: Toumba Stadium; Attendance: 28,516; Referee: Zlatanos

15 March 1970 24	Panachaiki	0–2 (w/o)	PAOK	Patras
				Stadium: Kostas Davourlis Stadium
Note: The last 13 games of Panachaiki were awarded to their opponents, because the team was involved in game fixing (the match was Aris–Panachaiki 0–0).

29 March 1970 25	PAOK	4–0	AEK Athens	Thessaloniki
	Sarafis 4' (pen.), 44'; Paridis 48'; Koudas 90'		Karafeskos (penalty missed) 52'	Stadium: Toumba Stadium; Attendance: 21,716; Referee: Papavasiliou

5 April 1970 26	PAOK	3–0	Olympiacos Volos	Thessaloniki
	Sarafis 6'; Tsouknidas 36' (o.g.); Koudas 49'			Stadium: Toumba Stadium; Attendance: 10,303

11 April 1970 27	Olympiakos Nicosia	1–2	PAOK	Nicosia
	Avramidis 2'		Laridis 19'; Sarafis 76'	Stadium: Old GSP Stadium

19 April 1970 28	PAOK	3–0	Egaleo	Thessaloniki
	Sarafis 10' (pen.); Koudas 15'; Paridis 87'			Stadium: Toumba Stadium; Referee: Vougiouklakis

4 May 1970 29	PAOK	1–0	OFI	Thessaloniki
	Koudas 28'			Stadium: Toumba Stadium; Referee: Mantas

11 May 1970 30	PAOK	2–0	Kavala	Thessaloniki
	Sarafis 18'; Paridis 21'			Stadium: Toumba Stadium; Attendance: 12,799; Referee: Moschatos

17 May 1970 31	Ethnikos Piraeus	1–1	PAOK	Piraeus
	Eleftheriadis 62' (pen.)		Paridis (red card) 43'; Makris (penalty missed) 53'; Afentoulidis 76'	Stadium: Karaiskakis Stadium; Referee: Kourkoulas

24 May 1970 32	PAOK	1–1	Iraklis	Thessaloniki
	Terzanidis 3'		Sentelidis 56'	Stadium: Toumba Stadium; Attendance: 19,115; Referee: Christos Michas (Athens)

31 May 1970 33	Panserraikos	1–0	PAOK	Serres
	Zarzopoulos 89'			Stadium: Serres Municipal Stadium; Attendance: 4,898

7 June 1970 34	Panionios	0–0	PAOK	Athens
				Stadium: Nea Smyrni Stadium; Attendance: 2,475

== Greek Cup ==
=== Second round ===
22 March 1970	PAOK	5–1	Makedonikos	Thessaloniki
	Sarafis 11', 43', 53'; Mouratidis 20'; Koudas 30'		Palaskas 71'	Stadium: Toumba Stadium; Attendance: 6,902; Referee: Tsiros

=== Round of 16 ===
27 April 1970	PAOK	4–0	Pierikos	Thessaloniki
	Koudas 37'; Makris (red card) 44'; Sarafis 52' (pen.); Paridis 68', 87'		Pantazis (red card) 44'	Stadium: Toumba Stadium; Attendance: 9,079; Referee: Theodoros

=== Quarter-finals ===
14 June 1970	PAOK	1–0	Panionios	Thessaloniki
	Koudas 61'			Stadium: Toumba Stadium

=== Semi-finals ===
21 June 1970	PAOK	1–0	Egaleo	Thessaloniki
	Fountoukidis 84'		Chrysostomou (red card) 39'	Stadium: Toumba Stadium

=== Final ===
28 June 1970	Aris	1–0	PAOK	Thessaloniki
20:30 EEST	Keramidas 8'		Koudas (penalty missed) 33'	Stadium: Kaftanzoglio Stadium; Attendance: 46,695; Referee: Christos Michas (Athens)

== Statistics ==
=== Squad statistics ===
As of June 28, 1970

Appearances denote players in the starting lineup, with the numbers in parentheses denoting appearances as substitute.

No.	Name	Alpha Ethniki		Greek Cup		Total	
No.	Name	Apps	Goals	Apps	Goals	Apps	Goals
Goalkeepers
	(Greece) Stelios Christodoulou	22	0	5	0	27	0
	(Greece) Kostas Pirtsos	8	0	1	0	9	0
	(Greece) Kostas Tsamoutis	3	0	0	0	3	0
Defenders
	(Greece) Giorgos Papachristoudis	32	0	5	0	37	0
	(Greece) Aristos Fountoukidis	31	0	4	1	35	1
	(Greece) Giorgos Makris	24	2	5	0	29	2
	(Greece) Emilios Theofanidis	20	0	5	0	25	0
	(Greece) Giorgos Kontogiorgos	15	0	3	0	18	0
	(Greece) Nikos Mitrakas	10	0	0	0	10	0
	(Greece) Pavlos Papadopoulos	2	1	0	0	2	1
	(Greece) Christos Katsikaris	2	0	0	0	2	0
	(Greece) Odysseas Oikonomou	1	0	0	0	1	0
Midfielders
	(Greece) Stavros Sarafis	31	17	4	4	35	21
	(Greece) Toulis Mouratidis	30	0	3	1	33	1
	(Greece) Giorgos Koudas	24	8	5	3	29	11
	(Greece) Giannis Giakoumis	25	3	3	0	28	3
	(Greece) Christos Terzanidis	19	1	5	0	24	1
	(Greece) Thomas Dramalis	9	0	3	0	12	0
	(Greece) Vasilis Lazos	10	0	1	0	11	0
Forwards
	(Greece) Dimitris Paridis	27	8	5	2	32	10
	(Greece) Anestis Afentoulidis	29	7	1	0	30	7
	(Greece) Achilleas Aslanidis	15	0	1	0	16	0
	(Greece) Alexandros Laridis	8	1	3	0	11	1
	(Greece) Giorgos Stergiadis	8	0	0	0	8	0

Source: Match reports in competitive matches, RSSSF

=== Goalscorers ===
Rank	No.	Pos.	Player	Alpha Ethniki	Greek Cup	Total
1		MF	(Greece) Stavros Sarafis	17	4	21
2		MF	(Greece) Giorgos Koudas	8	3	11
3		FW	(Greece) Dimitris Paridis	8	2	10
4		FW	(Greece) Anestis Afentoulidis	7	0	7
5		MF	(Greece) Giannis Giakoumis	3	0	3
6		DF	(Greece) Giorgos Makris	2	0	2
7		DF	(Greece) Pavlos Papadopoulos	1	0	1
7		MF	(Greece) Christos Terzanidis	1	0	1
7		FW	(Greece) Achilleas Aslanidis	1	0	1
7		FW	(Greece) Alexandros Laridis	1	0	1
7		DF	(Greece) Aristos Fountoukidis	0	1	1
7		MF	(Greece) Toulis Mouratidis	0	1	1
Own goals				1	0	1
Walkover				2	0	2
TOTALS				52	11	63

Source: Match reports in competitive matches, RSSSF
