= 1971–72 PAOK FC season =

PAOK
1971–72 season
- President: Ioannis Arvanitakis
- Manager: Les Shannon
- Stadium: Toumba Stadium
- Alpha Ethniki: 5th
- Greek Cup: Winners
- Top goalscorer: League: Koulis Apostolidis (12); All: Koulis Apostolidis (17)
- Highest home attendance: 40,051 vs Panathinaikos
Home colours

The 1971–72 season was PAOK Football Club's 46th in existence and the club's 13th consecutive season in the top flight of Greek football. The team entered the Greek Football Cup in first round and managed to go all the way and win their first domestic title in club's history.

== Players ==
=== Squad ===
Note: Flags indicate national team as defined under FIFA eligibility rules; some limited exceptions apply. Players may hold more than one non-FIFA nationality.

No.	Pos.	Nation	Player
—	GK	GRE	Apostolos Savvoulidis
—	GK	GRE	Savvas Chatzioannou
—	DF	GRE	Kostas Iosifidis
—	DF	GRE	Ioannis Gounaris
—	DF	GRE	Aristotelis Fountoukidis
—	DF	GRE	Michalis Bellis
—	DF	GRE	Pavlos Papadopoulos
—	DF	GRE	Ioannis Chatziantoniou
—	DF	GRE	Kostas Chatzikapetanis
—	DF	GRE	Christos Kalifoulis

No.	Pos.	Nation	Player
—	MF	GRE	Giorgos Koudas (captain)
—	MF	GRE	Koulis Apostolidis
—	MF	GRE	Stavros Sarafis
—	MF	GRE	Christos Terzanidis
—	MF	GRE	Vasilis Lazos
—	MF	GRE	Georgios Paraschos
—	FW	GRE	Achilleas Aslanidis
—	FW	GRE	Dimitris Paridis
—	FW	GRE	Giannis Mantzourakis
—	FW	GRE	Dimitris Stavridis
—	FW	GRE	Stelios Poulasouchidis
—	FW	GRE	Lefteris Tsakiropoulos

== Transfers ==
Players transferred in

Transfer Window	Pos.	Name	Club	Fee
Summer	DF	(Greece) Kostas Iosifidis	(Greece) Elpida Toumba	20.000 Dr.
Summer	MF	(Greece) Koulis Apostolidis	(United States) Dallas Tornado	Free

Players transferred out

Transfer Window	Pos.	Name	Club	Fee
Summer	GK	(Greece) Kostas Pirtsos	(Greece) Lamia	Free

== Pre-season ==
Win Draw Loss

17 August 1971 Friendly	Kastoria	2–3	PAOK	Kastoria
	Afentoulidis 15'; Siantsis 61'		Apostolidis 39', 51'; Koudas 60'

20 August 1971 Friendly	Florina	1–2	PAOK	Florina
	Emmanouelidis 75'		Tsakiropoulos 49'; Karamitsos 85'

25 August 1971 Friendly	PAOK	1–3	AEL	Thessaloniki
	Mantzourakis 60' (pen.)		Kontogiorgos 8'; Zervas 37', 44'	Stadium: Toumba Stadium

3 September 1971 Friendly	PAOK	4–0	Universidad Católica	Thessaloniki
	Koudas 19'; Apostolidis 46', 59', 74'			Stadium: Toumba Stadium

7 September 1971 Friendly	PAOK	1–1	Nacional Montevideo	Thessaloniki
	Apostolidis 77'		Morales 32'	Stadium: Toumba Stadium; Attendance: 16,270

9 September 1971 Friendly	AEL	2–0	PAOK	Larissa
	Boutos 44'; Seitaridis 88'			Stadium: Alcazar Stadium
Note: PAOK used substitute and reserve squad players.

12 September 1971 Friendly	Niki Polygyros	0–2	PAOK	Polygyros
			Papachristoudis 48'; Tsotsolis 50'
Note: PAOK used substitute and reserve squad players.

15 September 1971 Friendly	PAS Giannina	2–0	PAOK	Ioannina
	Charitidis 72'; Lazos 82' (o.g.)
Note: PAOK used substitute and reserve squad players.

== Competitions ==
=== Overview ===
Competition	Record							
Competition	Pld	W	D	L	GF	GA	GD	Win %
Alpha Ethniki	34	18	10	6	53	27	+26	52.94
Greek Cup	6	6	0	0	16	4	+12	100.00
Total	40	24	10	6	69	31	+38	60.00

Source: Competitions

== Alpha Ethniki ==
=== Standings ===
Pos	Team	Pld	W	D	L	GF	GA	GD	Pts	Qualification or relegation
3	AEK Athens	34	20	8	6	57	23	+34	82	Qualification for UEFA Cup first round
4	Aris	34	18	11	5	52	25	+27	81	
5	PAOK	34	18	10	6	53	27	+26	80	Qualification for Cup Winners' Cup first round
6	Panachaiki	34	11	14	9	40	35	+5	70	
7	Panionios	34	13	9	12	32	33	−1	69	

Source: RSSSF
Rules for classification: 1st points; 2nd decision match; 3rd head-to-head goal difference.

==== Results summary ====
Overall								Home						Away					
Pld	W	D	L	GF	GA	GD	Pts	W	D	L	GF	GA	GD	W	D	L	GF	GA	GD
34	18	10	6	53	27	+26	64	13	3	1	38	13	+25	5	7	5	15	14	+1

Last updated: 25 June 1972.
Source: Competitive matches

==== Results by round ====
Round	1	2	3	4	5	6	7	8	9	10	11	12	13	14	15	16	17	18	19	20	21	22	23	24	25	26	27	28	29	30	31	32	33	34
Ground	A	H	H	A	H	A	H	A	H	A	A	H	A	H	A	H	A	H	A	A	H	A	H	A	H	A	H	H	A	H	A	H	Α	H
Result	L	D	D	D	W	W	W	W	W	W	L	W	D	L	L	D	D	W	W	D	W	W	W	D	W	D	W	W	L	W	L	W	D	W
Position	15	14	12	12	8	6	3	3	3	3	4	3	4	4	5	5	5	5	5	5	5	5	4	4	4	4	4	4	5	5	5	5	5	5

Source: League matches
A = Away; H = Home; W = Win; D = Draw; L = Loss

==== Matches ====
Win Draw Loss

19 September 1971 1	AEK Athens	1–0	PAOK	Athens
	Ventouris 79'			Stadium: Nikos Goumas Stadium; Attendance: 28,581

26 September 1971 2	PAOK	2–2	Trikala	Thessaloniki
	Apostolidis 31'; Sarafis 33'		Chondros 71'; Sinatkas 81'	Stadium: Toumba Stadium; Attendance: 17,016

3 October 1971 3	PAOK	1–1	Iraklis	Thessaloniki
	Sarafis 6'		Aidiniou 24'	Stadium: Toumba Stadium; Attendance: 27,188; Referee: Kougias

10 October 1971 4	Ethnikos Piraeus	1–1	PAOK	Piraeus
	Kritikopoulos 29'		Kremmydas 59' (o.g.)	Stadium: Karaiskakis Stadium; Referee: Levogiannis

17 October 1971 5	PAOK	3–0	Apollon Athens	Thessaloniki
	Mantzourakis 31' (pen.); Apostolidis 63', 80'			Stadium: Toumba Stadium; Referee: Pagourtzis

24 October 1971 6	Olympiacos Volos	0–1	PAOK	Volos
			Bellis 4'	Stadium: Volos Municipal Stadium; Attendance: 10,610

31 October 1971 7	PAOK	2–0	Kavala	Thessaloniki
	Aslanidis 51'; Apostolidis 87'			Stadium: Toumba Stadium; Attendance: 15,528

7 November 1971 8	Olympiakos Nicosia	0–1	PAOK	Nicosia
			Bellis 76'	Stadium: Old GSP Stadium

14 November 1971 9	PAOK	3–0	Pierikos	Thessaloniki
	Apostolidis 9'; Aslanidis 40', 84' (pen.)			Stadium: Toumba Stadium

21 November 1971 10	Panionios	0–1	PAOK	Athens
			Koudas 82'	Stadium: Nea Smyrni Stadium

12 December 1971 11	Fostiras	1–0	PAOK	Athens
	Panopoulos 49'			Stadium: Tavros Stadium; Referee: Famelis

19 December 1971 12	PAOK	5–0	Veria	Thessaloniki
	Koudas 2'; Apostolidis 10'; Paridis 68', 76'; Sarafis 72'			Stadium: Toumba Stadium; Attendance: 15,289

26 December 1971 13	Panachaiki	1–1	PAOK	Patras
	Davourlis 58'		Sarafis 49'	Stadium: Kostas Davourlis Stadium; Referee: Dikopoulos

2 January 1972 14	PAOK	1–2	Egaleo	Thessaloniki
	Sarafis 55'		Kyriakidis 48', 84'	Stadium: Toumba Stadium; Attendance: 15,714

9 January 1972 15	Panathinaikos	1–0	PAOK	Athens
	Fylakouris 9'			Stadium: Leoforos Stadium; Attendance: 25,968

16 January 1972 16	PAOK	0–0	Aris	Thessaloniki
				Stadium: Toumba Stadium; Attendance: 37,869; Referee: Vamvakopoulos

23 January 1972 17	Olympiacos	1–1	PAOK	Piraeus
	Pamboullis 75'		Apostolidis 76'	Stadium: Karaiskakis Stadium; Attendance: 37,405; Referee: Christos Michas (Athens)

30 January 1972 18	PAOK	2–0	AEK Athens	Thessaloniki
	Sarafis 18'; Paridis 56'			Stadium: Toumba Stadium; Attendance: 35,411

6 February 1972 19	Trikala	1–2	PAOK	Trikala
	Papasimos 86'		Paridis 84'; Koudas 88'	Stadium: Trikala Municipal Stadium; Attendance: 5,703

13 February 1972 20	Iraklis	1–1	PAOK	Thessaloniki
	Aidiniou 62' (pen.)		Sarafis 43'	Stadium: Kaftanzoglio Stadium; Attendance: 38,752; Referee: Latsios

20 February 1972 21	PAOK	1–0	Ethnikos Piraeus	Thessaloniki
	Koudas 14'			Stadium: Toumba Stadium

27 February 1972 22	Apollon Athens	0–1	PAOK	Athens
			Sarafis 21'	Stadium: Rizoupoli Stadium; Attendance: 8,814

12 March 1972 23	PAOK	1–0	Olympiacos Volos	Thessaloniki
	Gounaris 77'			Stadium: Toumba Stadium; Attendance: 8,020; Referee: Alexopoulos

19 March 1972 24	Kavala	0–0	PAOK	Kavala
				Stadium: Kavala Stadium; Attendance: 17,296

26 March 1972 25	PAOK	5–1	Olympiakos Nicosia	Thessaloniki
	Koudas 19'; Paridis 24'; Apostolidis 25'; Aslanidis 27'; Terzanidis 59' (pen.)		Pavlou 38'	Stadium: Toumba Stadium; Attendance: 9,733

2 April 1972 26	Pierikos	0–0	PAOK	Katerini
				Stadium: Katerini Stadium; Attendance: 10,400

16 April 1972 27	PAOK	1–0	Panionios	Thessaloniki
	Koudas 20'			Stadium: Toumba Stadium; Attendance: 17,512

23 April 1972 28	PAOK	4–2	Fostiras	Thessaloniki
	Bellis 9'; Apostolidis 16'; Aslanidis 41'; Koudas 68'		Panopoulos 26'; Natsis 67'	Stadium: Toumba Stadium; Referee: Armodoros

30 April 1972 29	Veria	1–0	PAOK	Veria
	Terzis 69'			Stadium: Veria Stadium; Attendance: 8,149

14 May 1972 30	PAOK	3–2	Panachaiki	Thessaloniki
	Androutsos 4' (o.g.); Aslanidis 47'; Gounaris 88'		Michalopoulos 51'; Kalfin 61'	Stadium: Toumba Stadium

21 May 1972 31	Egaleo	2–1	PAOK	Athens
	Exomanidis 38'; Kyriakidis 77'		Apostolidis 40'	Stadium: Stavros Mavrothalassitis Stadium; Attendance: 7,165

28 May 1972 32	PAOK	1–0	Panathinaikos	Thessaloniki
	Apostolidis 39'			Stadium: Toumba Stadium; Attendance: 40,051; Referee: Marinos

4 June 1972 33	Aris	3–3	PAOK	Thessaloniki
	Papaioannou 18'; Syropoulos 35'; Alexiadis 39'		Fountoukidis 21'; Paridis (red card) 38'; Mantzourakis (penalty missed) 47' 65'; Gounaris 88'	Stadium: Kleanthis Vikelidis Stadium; Attendance: 13,420; Referee: Zlatanos

25 June 1972 34	PAOK	4–3	Olympiacos	Thessaloniki
	Apostolidis 6'; Mantzourakis 33'; Sarafis 39', 48'		Gioutsos 19'; Karavitis 24'; Pamboullis 47'	Stadium: Toumba Stadium; Attendance: 21,161

== Greek Cup ==
=== First round ===
1 September 1971	PAOK	5–1	Foinikas Polichni	Thessaloniki
	Sarafis 65', 80'; Aslanidis 68', 90'; Papadopoulos 84'		Lazaridis 38'	Stadium: Toumba Stadium; Referee: Zidopoulos

=== Second round ===
5 December 1971	PAOK	3–1	Pierikos	Thessaloniki
	Paridis 9'; Fountoukidis 41'; Apostolidis 64'		Mytilinaios 85'	Stadium: Toumba Stadium

=== Third round ===
8 March 1972	PAOK	2–0	Aias Salamina	Thessaloniki
	Koudas 8'; Apostolidis 57'			Stadium: Toumba Stadium

=== Quarter–finals ===
7 June 1972	Aris	1–2	PAOK	Thessaloniki
	Semertzis 16'; Balafas (red card) 43'		Apostolidis 5', 22'	Stadium: Kleanthis Vikelidis Stadium; Attendance: 13,919; Referee: Christos Michas (Athens)
Note: The match was abandoned in the 89th minute following an altercation between Aris players and the referee.

=== Semi–finals ===
28 June 1972	PAOK	2–0	Lamia	Thessaloniki
	Koudas 47'; Apostolidis 53'			Stadium: Toumba Stadium; Attendance: 23,589

=== Final ===
5 July 1972	Panathinaikos	1–2	PAOK	Piraeus
20:30 EEST	Papadimitriou 89'		Koudas 2', 88'	Stadium: Karaiskakis Stadium; Attendance: 34,831; Referee: Christos Michas (Athens)

== Statistics ==
=== Squad statistics ===
As of July 5, 1972

Appearances denote players in the starting lineup, with the numbers in parentheses denoting appearances as substitute.

No.	Name	Alpha Ethniki		Greek Cup		Total	
No.	Name	Apps	Goals	Apps	Goals	Apps	Goals
Goalkeepers
	(Greece) Apostolos Savvoulidis	32	0	4	0	36	0
	(Greece) Savvas Chatzioannou	4	0	3	0	7	0
Defenders
	(Greece) Ioannis Gounaris	34	3	6	0	40	3
	(Greece) Kostas Iosifidis	32	0	5	0	37	0
	(Greece) Michalis Bellis	31	3	6	0	37	3
	(Greece) Aristos Fountoukidis	28	1	5	1	33	2
	(Greece) Pavlos Papadopoulos	27	0	6	0	33	0
	(Greece) Ioannis Chatziantoniou	3	0	1	0	4	0
	(Greece) Kostas Chatzikapetanis	3	0	1	0	4	0
	(Greece) Christos Kalifoulis	1	0	0	0	1	0
Midfielders
	(Greece) Koulis Apostolidis	34	12	6	5	40	17
	(Greece) Christos Terzanidis	32	1	6	0	38	1
	(Greece) Giorgos Koudas	31	7	6	4	37	11
	(Greece) Stavros Sarafis	21	10	5	2	26	12
	(Greece) Vasilis Lazos	13	0	5	0	18	0
	(Greece) Georgios Paraschos	4	0	1	0	5	0
Forwards
	(Greece) Achilleas Aslanidis	25	6	4	2	29	8
	(Greece) Dimitris Paridis	28	5	2	1	30	6
	(Greece) Giannis Mantzourakis	13	3	3	0	16	3
	(Greece) Dimitris Stavridis	2	0	0	0	2	0
	(Greece) Stelios Poulasouchidis	2	0	0	0	2	0
	(Greece) Lefteris Tsakiropoulos	1	0	1	0	2	0

Source: Match reports in competitive matches, RSSSF

=== Goalscorers ===
Rank	No.	Pos.	Player	Alpha Ethniki	Greek Cup	Total
1		MF	(Greece) Koulis Apostolidis	12	5	17
2		MF	(Greece) Stavros Sarafis	10	2	12
3		MF	(Greece) Giorgos Koudas	7	4	11
4		FW	(Greece) Achilleas Aslanidis	6	2	8
5		FW	(Greece) Dimitris Paridis	5	1	6
6		FW	(Greece) Giannis Mantzourakis	3	0	3
6		DF	(Greece) Michalis Bellis	3	0	3
6		DF	(Greece) Ioannis Gounaris	3	0	3
9		DF	(Greece) Aristos Fountoukidis	1	1	2
10		MF	(Greece) Christos Terzanidis	1	0	1
10		DF	(Greece) Pavlos Papadopoulos	0	1	1
Own goals				2	0	2
TOTALS				53	16	69

Source: Match reports in competitive matches, RSSSF
