= 1975–76 PAOK FC season =

PAOK
1975–76 season
- President: Giorgos Pantelakis
- Manager: Gyula Lóránt
- Stadium: Toumba Stadium
- Alpha Ethniki: Winners
- Greek Cup: Round of 16
- UEFA Cup: First round
- Top goalscorer: League: Giorgos Koudas (14); All: Giorgos Koudas, Angelos Anastasiadis (15)
- Highest home attendance: 45,200 vs Barcelona
- Lowest home attendance: 6,191 vs Kastoria
- Average home league attendance: 19,436
Home colours

The 1975–76 season was PAOK Football Club's 50th in existence and the club's 17th consecutive season in the top flight of Greek football. The team entered the Greek Football Cup in first round, and also faced Barcelona in the UEFA Cup first round.

== Players ==
=== Squad ===
Note: Flags indicate national team as defined under FIFA eligibility rules; some limited exceptions apply. Players may hold more than one non-FIFA nationality.

No.	Pos.	Nation	Player
—	GK	YUG	Mladen Furtula
—	GK	GRE	Sakis Pantelidis
—	DF	GRE	Kostas Iosifidis
—	DF	GRE	Ioannis Gounaris
—	DF	GRE	Filotas Pellios
—	DF	GRE	Aristos Fountoukidis
—	DF	GRE	Themis Kapousouzis
—	MF	GRE	Giorgos Koudas (captain)
—	MF	GRE	Koulis Apostolidis
—	MF	GRE	Angelos Anastasiadis

No.	Pos.	Nation	Player
—	MF	GRE	Stavros Sarafis
—	MF	GRE	Christos Terzanidis
—	MF	GRE	Dimitris Voulgaris
—	MF	GRE	Giorgos Mouratidis
—	FW	BRA	Neto Guerino
—	FW	GRE	Panagiotis Kermanidis
—	FW	GRE	Achilleas Aslanidis
—	FW	GRE	Kostas Orfanos
—	FW	GRE	Dimitris Paridis

== Transfers ==
Players transferred in

Transfer Window	Pos.	Name	Club
Summer	GK	(Socialist Federal Republic of Yugoslavia) Mladen Furtula	(Greece) Panserraikos
Summer	GK	(Greece) Sakis Pantelidis	(Greece) AEL
Summer	MF	(Greece) Giorgos Mouratidis	(Greece) Polykastro

Players transferred out

Transfer Window	Pos.	Name	Club
Summer	GK	(Switzerland) René Deck	(West Germany) VfB Stuttgart
Summer	GK	(Greece) Ioannis Stefas	(Greece) Korinthos
Summer	DF	(Greece) Babis Tsilingiridis	(Greece) Kastoria

== Pre-season ==
Win Draw Loss

6 August 1975 Friendly	Niki Volos	0–2	PAOK	Volos
			Aslanidis; Apostolidis

16 August 1975 Friendly	PAOK	1–1	Kastoria	Thessaloniki
	Koudas 26'		Afentoulidis 40'	Stadium: Toumba Stadium

21 August 1975 Friendly	Panathinaikos	1–1	PAOK	Athens
	Vakalis 62'		Anastasiadis 34'	Stadium: Leoforos Stadium

24 August 1975 Friendly	PAOK	4–0	PAO Koufalia	Thessaloniki
	Sarafis 32'; Aslanidis 58', 72'; Kermanidis 70'			Stadium: Toumba Stadium

31 August 1975 Friendly	PAOK	2–3	Panathinaikos	Thessaloniki
	Sarafis 22', 35'		Livathinos 5', 13', 69'	Stadium: Toumba Stadium

3 September 1975 Friendly	PAOK	4–0	Anagennisi Karditsa	Thessaloniki
	Sarafis 34', 39'; Aslanidis 54'; Apostolidis 80'			Stadium: Toumba Stadium

7 September 1975 Friendly	PAOK	2–0	Panserraikos	Thessaloniki
	Koudas 45', 70'			Stadium: Toumba Stadium

10 September 1975 Friendly	PAOK	2–2	Olympiacos	Thessaloniki
	Koudas 18'; Aslanidis 50'		Pamboullis 37'; Kritikopoulos 44'	Stadium: Toumba Stadium

13 September 1975 Friendly	PAOK	14–3	Akropolis	Thessaloniki
	Aslanidis; Anastasiadis; Paridis; Guerino; Terzanidis; Koudas; Sarafis			Stadium: Toumba Stadium

20 September 1975 Friendly	Olympiacos	0–1	PAOK	Piraeus
			Terzanidis 69'	Stadium: Karaiskakis Stadium

27 September 1975 Friendly	PAOK	2–1	Pierikos	Thessaloniki
	Aslanidis 6'; Sarafis 38'		Kalampakas 2'	Stadium: Toumba Stadium

== Competitions ==
=== Overview ===
Competition	Record							
Competition	Pld	W	D	L	GF	GA	GD	Win %
Alpha Ethniki	30	21	7	2	60	17	+43	70.00
Greek Cup	3	2	1	0	7	1	+6	66.67
UEFA Cup	2	1	0	1	2	6	−4	50.00
Total	35	24	8	3	69	24	+45	68.57

Source: Competitions

== Alpha Ethniki ==
=== Standings ===
Pos	Team	Pld	W	D	L	GF	GA	GD	Pts	Qualification
1	PAOK (C)	30	21	7	2	60	17	+43	49	Qualification for European Cup first round
2	AEK Athens	30	18	8	4	57	18	+39	44	Qualification for UEFA Cup first round
3	Olympiacos	30	16	9	5	48	28	+20	41	Qualification for UEFA Cup first round
4	Panathinaikos	30	14	10	6	47	28	+19	38	
5	PAS Giannina	30	15	6	9	40	33	+7	36	

Source: RSSSF
Rules for classification: 1st points; 2nd decision match; 3rd head-to-head goal difference.
(C) Champions

==== Results summary ====
Overall								Home						Away					
Pld	W	D	L	GF	GA	GD	Pts	W	D	L	GF	GA	GD	W	D	L	GF	GA	GD
30	21	7	2	60	17	+43	70	11	3	1	32	10	+22	10	4	1	28	7	+21

Last updated: 23 May 1976.
Source: Competitive matches

==== Results by round ====
Round	1	2	3	4	5	6	7	8	9	10	11	12	13	14	15	16	17	18	19	20	21	22	23	24	25	26	27	28	29	30
Ground	H	A	H	A	H	A	H	A	H	A	A	H	A	H	A	H	A	A	H	A	H	A	H	H	A	H	H	A	H	A
Result	W	D	W	W	D	L	W	W	W	W	D	D	W	W	D	D	W	W	W	W	W	D	W	W	W	W	W	W	L	W
Position	4	4	7	5	5	4	8	5	2	2	2	2	2	2	2	2	2	2	2	2	2	2	2	1	1	1	1	1	1	1

Source: League matches
A = Away; H = Home; W = Win; D = Draw; L = Loss

• Matches are in chronological order

==== Matches ====
Win Draw Loss

5 October 1975 1	PAOK	3–1	Panathinaikos	Thessaloniki
	Guerino 37', 56'; Sarafis 84'		Grammos 89'	Stadium: Toumba Stadium; Attendance: 18.615; Referee: Moniakis

19 October 1975 2	Aris	0–0	PAOK	Thessaloniki
			Sarafis (penalty missed) 34'	Stadium: Kleanthis Vikelidis Stadium; Attendance: 21.069; Referee: Papazoglou

9 November 1975 4	PAOK	3–0	Apollon Athens	Thessaloniki
	Apostolidis 57'; Anastasiadis 69', 82'			Stadium: Toumba Stadium; Attendance: 8.460; Referee: Latsios

16 November 1975 5	Panserraikos	0–1	PAOK	Serres
			Guerino 78'	Stadium: Serres Municipal Stadium; Referee: Pantzalis

23 November 1975 6	PAOK	1–1	Pierikos	Thessaloniki
	Koudas 51'		Kostikos 69'	Stadium: Toumba Stadium; Attendance: 9.815; Referee: Eleftheriadis

30 November 1975 7	PAS Giannina	2–0	PAOK	Ioannina
	Álvarez 4'; Glasmanis 67'		Aslanidis (red card) 67'	Stadium: Zosimades Stadium; Referee: Protonotarios
Note: Aslanidis received a 10-match ban for his sending-off and subsequent reaction.

7 December 1975 8	PAOK	3–0	Kastoria	Thessaloniki
	Koudas 30', 62'; Orfanos 33'			Stadium: Toumba Stadium; Attendance: 6.191; Referee: Petropoulos

14 December 1975 9	Panionios	0–4	PAOK	Larissa
			Anastasiadis 5' (pen.); Koudas 36', 51'; Kermanidis 73'	Stadium: Alcazar Stadium; Referee: Tsanaklidis
Note: Game held at Larissa because Panionios had a stadium ban.

21 December 1975 10	PAOK	2–0	Panachaiki	Thessaloniki
	Anastasiadis 2' (pen.); Koudas 64'			Stadium: Toumba Stadium; Attendance: 12.225; Referee: Kaladamis

4 January 1976 11	Olympiacos	0–4	PAOK	Piraeus
			Terzanidis 24'; Koudas 56', 62'; Guerino 77'	Stadium: Karaiskakis Stadium; Attendance: 39.030; Referee: Vamvakopoulos

11 January 1976 12	AEK Athens	0–0	PAOK	Patras
				Stadium: Kostas Davourlis Stadium; Attendance: 20.105; Referee: Tsanaklidis
Note: Game held at Patras because AEK had a stadium ban.

18 January 1976 13	PAOK	2–2	Iraklis	Thessaloniki
	Koudas 1'; Anastasiadis 54' (pen.)		Gesios 22' (pen.); Christoforidis 84'	Stadium: Toumba Stadium; Attendance: 26.091; Referee: Platopoulos

25 January 1976 14	Atromitos	0–1	PAOK	Athens
			Apostolidis 5'	Stadium: Peristeri Stadium; Attendance: 8.502; Referee: Kollyropoulos

1 February 1976 15	PAOK	1–0	Ethnikos Piraeus	Thessaloniki
	Koudas 52'			Stadium: Toumba Stadium; Attendance: 18.852; Referee: Latsios

15 February 1976 16	Panathinaikos	1–1	PAOK	Athens
	Antoniadis 22' (pen.)		Anastasiadis 20' (pen.)	Stadium: Leoforos Alexandras Stadium; Attendance: 24.646; Referee: Moniakis

22 February 1976 17	PAOK	2–2	Aris	Thessaloniki
	Sarafis 14'; Apostolidis 29'		Ballis 39'; Drampis 84'	Stadium: Toumba Stadium; Attendance: 42.296; Referee: Sapatakidis

29 February 1976 18	Panetolikos	0–2	PAOK	Agrinio
			Sarafis 72' (pen.); Kermanidis 86'	Stadium: Panetolikos Stadium; Referee: Rammos

7 March 1976 19	Apollon Athens	0–1	PAOK	Athens
			Sarafis 5'	Stadium: Georgios Kamaras Stadium; Referee: Panagopoulos

14 March 1976 20	PAOK	1–0	Panserraikos	Thessaloniki
	Guerino 22'			Stadium: Toumba Stadium; Attendance: 9.304; Referee: Giannopoulos

21 March 1976 21	Pierikos	1–2	PAOK	Katerini
	Lapis 32' (pen.)		Anastasiadis 17' (pen.); Guerino 24'	Stadium: Katerini Stadium; Referee: Sarakinos

28 March 1976 22	PAOK	1–0	PAS Giannina	Thessaloniki
	Sarafis 28'			Stadium: Toumba Stadium; Attendance: 22.781; Referee: Petropoulos

4 April 1976 23	Kastoria	2–2	PAOK	Kastoria
	Moschofidis 2'; Papadopoulos 47'		Apostolidis 19'; Kermanidis 48'	Stadium: Municipal Stadium of Kastoria; Referee: Latsios

7 April 1976 3	PAOK	4–1	Panetolikos	Thessaloniki
	Guerino 14', 83'; Sarafis 53'; Anastasiadis 88'		Pappas 80' (pen.)	Stadium: Toumba Stadium; Attendance: 10.813; Referee: Moniakis
Note: Match was initially scheduled on 27 October 1975.

11 April 1976 24	PAOK	4–0	Panionios	Thessaloniki
	Chaitas 6' (o.g.); Kermanidis 40'; Sarafis 61' (pen.); Terzanidis 82'			Stadium: Toumba Stadium; Attendance: 11.573; Referee: Papazoglou

18 April 1976 25	Panachaiki	0–3	PAOK	Patras
			Apostolidis 13'; Anastasiadis 58'; Sarafis 61'	Stadium: Kostas Davourlis Stadium; Referee: Sapatakidis

26 April 1976 26	PAOK	3–1	Olympiacos	Thessaloniki
	Kermanidis 27'; Sarafis 36'; Guerino 44'		Galakos 11'	Stadium: Toumba Stadium; Attendance: 33.378; Referee: Papazoglou

2 May 1976 27	PAOK	1–0	AEK Athens	Thessaloniki
	Sarafis (penalty missed) 18'; Guerino 89'			Stadium: Toumba Stadium; Attendance: 45.010; Referee: Papavasiliou

9 May 1976 28	Iraklis	1–3	PAOK	Thessaloniki
	Hatzipanagis 49' (pen.)		Guerino 18' (pen.); Sarafis 32'; Koudas 74'	Stadium: Kaftanzoglio Stadium; Attendance: 31.845; Referee: Rammos

16 May 1976 29	PAOK	1–2	Atromitos	Thessaloniki
	Koudas 28'		Espinosa 19', 30'	Stadium: Toumba Stadium; Attendance: 16.134; Referee: Papavasiliou

23 May 1976 30	Ethnikos Piraeus	0–4	PAOK	Piraeus
			Koudas 21', 43'; Sarafis 33'; Stamatakis 36' (o.g.)	Stadium: Karaiskakis Stadium

== Greek Cup ==
=== First round ===
2 November 1975	PAOK	4–0	Levadiakos	Thessaloniki
14:30 EET	Anastasiadis 7', 36', 73', 88'			Stadium: Toumba Stadium; Attendance: 6,429; Referee: Makris (Athens)

=== Second round ===
8 February 1976	PAOK	2–0	PAS Giannina	Thessaloniki
14:30 EET	Guerino 32'; Anastasiadis 41'			Stadium: Toumba Stadium; Attendance: 16,570; Referee: Levoyiannis (Athens)

=== Round of 16 ===
10 March 1976	Olympiacos	1–1 (a.e.t.) (6–5 p)	PAOK	Piraeus
14:30 EET	Karavitis 43'		Guerino 53'	Stadium: Karaiskakis Stadium; Attendance: 38,846; Referee: Kolliropoulos (Achaea)
	Penalties
	Davourlis (penalty scored); Karavitis (penalty scored); Galakos (penalty scored); Siokos (penalty missed); Viera (penalty scored); Kyrastas (penalty scored); Vasilopoulos (penalty scored)		(penalty scored) Anastasiadis; (penalty scored) Sarafis; (penalty missed) Paridis; (penalty scored) Guerino; (penalty scored) Furtula; (penalty scored) Pellios; (penalty missed) Gounaris

== UEFA Cup ==
=== First round ===
16 September 1975 1st leg	PAOK (Greece)	1–0	(Spain) Barcelona	Thessaloniki, Greece
21:00 EET	Koudas 74'	Report		Stadium: Toumba Stadium; Attendance: 45,200; Referee: Nicolae Petriceanu (Romania)

1 October 1975 2nd leg	Barcelona (Spain)	6–1 (6–2 agg.)	(Greece) PAOK	Barcelona, Spain
20:45 CET	Neeskens 25' (pen.), 57' (pen.); Rexach 43', 66', 81'; Cruyff 53'	Report	Anastasiadis 78'	Stadium: Camp Nou; Attendance: 32,708; Referee: Jack Taylor (England)

== Statistics ==
=== Squad statistics ===
As of May 23, 1976

Appearances denote players in the starting lineup, with the numbers in parentheses denoting appearances as substitute.

No.	Name	Alpha Ethniki		Greek Cup		UEFA Cup		Total	
No.	Name	Apps	Goals	Apps	Goals	Apps	Goals	Apps	Goals
Goalkeepers
	(Socialist Federal Republic of Yugoslavia) Mladen Furtula	30	0	3	0	2	0	35	0
Defenders
	(Greece) Filotas Pellios	30	0	2	0	2	0	34	0
	(Greece) Kostas Iosifidis	29	0	3	0	2	0	34	0
	(Greece) Ioannis Gounaris	29	0	3	0	0	0	32	0
	(Greece) Aristos Fountoukidis	25	0	3	0	0	0	28	0
	(Greece) Themis Kapousouzis	1	0	1	0	0	0	2	0
Midfielders
	(Greece) Koulis Apostolidis	29	5	2	0	2	0	33	5
	(Greece) Angelos Anastasiadis	28	9	3	5	2	1	33	15
	(Greece) Giorgos Koudas	26	14	3	0	2	1	31	15
	(Greece) Stavros Sarafis	24	11	1	0	2	0	27	11
	(Greece) Christos Terzanidis	24	2	2	0	0	0	26	2
	(Greece) Dimitris Voulgaris	5	0	2	0	0	0	7	0
	(Greece) Giorgos Mouratidis	1	0	0	0	0	0	1	0
Forwards
	(Brazil) Neto Guerino	30	11	3	2	2	0	35	13
	(Greece) Panagiotis Kermanidis	28	5	2	0	2	0	32	5
	(Greece) Achilleas Aslanidis	12	0	1	0	2	0	15	0
	(Greece) Kostas Orfanos	8	1	1	0	0	0	9	1
	(Greece) Dimitris Paridis	1	0	2	0	2	0	5	0

Source: Match reports in competitive matches, RSSSF

=== Goalscorers ===
Rank	No.	Pos.	Player	Alpha Ethniki	Greek Cup	UEFA Cup	Total
1		MF	(Greece) Giorgos Koudas	14	0	1	15
2		MF	(Greece) Angelos Anastasiadis	9	5	1	15
3		FW	(Brazil) Neto Guerino	11	2	0	13
4		MF	(Greece) Stavros Sarafis	11	0	0	11
5		MF	(Greece) Koulis Apostolidis	5	0	0	5
5		FW	(Greece) Panagiotis Kermanidis	5	0	0	5
7		MF	(Greece) Christos Terzanidis	2	0	0	2
8		FW	(Greece) Kostas Orfanos	1	0	0	1
Own goals				2	0	0	2
TOTALS				60	7	2	69

Source: Match reports in competitive matches, RSSSF
