= Achilleas Aslanidis =

Greek footballer (born 1950)

Personal information
- Date of birth: 5 January 1950 (age 76)
- Place of birth: Kalamaria, Thessaloniki, Greece
- Position: Forward

Youth career
- –1968: Apollon Kalamarias

Senior career*
Years	Team	Apps	(Gls)
1968–1976	PAOK	184	(55)
1976–1979	Panathinaikos	53	(16)
Total		237	(71)

International career
1973–1975	Greece	11	(0)
- * Club domestic league appearances and goals

Achilleas Aslanidis (Greek: Αχιλλέας Ασλανίδης; born 5 January 1950) is a former Greek international footballer, who rose to prominence as a forward during the 1970s, playing for PAOK and Panathinaikos.

== Career ==
=== Club career ===
"Aslanidis was a significant asset to PAOK's attack, providing it with explosiveness and goals."

— Giorgos Koudas
Bliatkas, Kostas. Giorgos Koudas - The game of my life. Ianos publications, 2005, p. 150.

Born and raised in Kalamaria, Thessaloniki, Aslanidis comes from a Pontic Greek background. He took his first footballing steps in the youth ranks of Apollon Kalamarias, a historic club founded by Pontic refugees with a strong Pontic identity.

In the summer of 1968, he was transferred to PAOK and became a key member of the club's talented 1970s squad. Across 220 appearances in all competitions, he scored 70 goals and helped the team win two Greek Cups (1972, 1974) as well as the club's historic first-ever league title in 1976.

In the summer of 1976, he moved to Panathinaikos. In his very first season in Athens (1976–77), he won the domestic double along with the Balkans Cup, recording 53 league appearances and 16 goals before retiring in 1979.

=== International career ===
Aslanidis had 11 caps for the Greece national team, between 1973 and 1975. He was also a member of the Greece U23 squad that won the Balkan Youth Championship in 1971.

== Career statistics ==
=== Club career ===
Appearances and goals by club, season and competition
Club	Season	League			Cup		Continental		Total	
Club	Season	Division	Apps	Goals	Apps	Goals	Apps	Goals	Apps	Goals
Apollon Kalamarias	1966–67	Beta Ethniki			1	0	–			
Apollon Kalamarias	1967–68	Beta Ethniki					–			
Apollon Kalamarias	Total						–			
PAOK	1968–69	Alpha Ethniki	24	4	1	0	–		25	4
PAOK	1969–70	Alpha Ethniki	15	0	1	0	–		16	0
PAOK	1970–71	Alpha Ethniki	33	9	5	4	1 (Note: Inter-Cities Fairs Cup app.)	0	39	13
PAOK	1971–72	Alpha Ethniki	25	6	4	2	–		29	8
PAOK	1972–73	Alpha Ethniki	27	7	6	3	2	1	35	11
PAOK	1973–74	Alpha Ethniki	29	16	5	3	6	2	40	21
PAOK	1974–75	Alpha Ethniki	19	13	0	0	2	0	21	13
PAOK	1975–76	Alpha Ethniki	12	0	1	0	2	0	15	0
PAOK	Total		184	55	23	12	13	3	220	70
Panathinaikos	1976–77	Alpha Ethniki	15	1		1	–			2
Panathinaikos	1977–78	Alpha Ethniki	29	15	2	1	4	1	35	17
Panathinaikos	1978–79	Alpha Ethniki	9	0		0	0	0		0
Panathinaikos	Total		53	16		2	4	1		19
Career total			237	71			17	4		

Sources: RSSSF, Makedonia NLG Digital Library, uefa.com, worldfootball.net

=== International career ===
National team	Year	Caps
Greece
Greece	1973	3
Greece	1974	5
Greece	1975	3
Total		11

== Honours ==
PAOK

- Alpha Ethniki: 1975–76
- Greek Cup: 1971–72, 1973–74

Panathinaikos

- Alpha Ethniki: 1976–77
- Greek Cup: 1976–77
- Balkans Cup: 1977

Greece U23

- Balkan Youth Championship: 1971

== Bibliography ==
- Bliatkas, Kostas (2005). Γιώργος Κούδας, της ζωής μου το παιχνίδι [Giorgos Koudas, the game of my life] (in Greek). Greece: Ianos Publications. ISBN 978-960-7827-35-7.
- Pappous, Michalis (2019). Ο ΠΑΟΚ του '70 [The PAOK of the '70s] (in Greek). Greece: University Studio Press. ISBN 978-960-12-2421-3.
