= Koulis Apostolidis =

Greek footballer (born 1946)

Κούλης Αποστολίδης Kirk Apostolidis
Personal information
- Full name: Kyriakos Apostolidis
- Date of birth: 3 March 1946 (age 80)
- Place of birth: Thessaloniki, Greece
- Height: 1.78 m (5 ft 10 in)
- Positions: Defender; forward

Youth career
- 1959–1963: PAOK

College career
Years	Team	Apps	(Gls)
1965–1967	San Francisco Dons		

Senior career*
Years	Team	Apps	(Gls)
1963–1965	PAOK	43	(8)
1968	Vancouver Royals	7	(0)
1969–1971	Dallas Tornado	49	(29)
1971–1979	PAOK	238	(43)
1980	Toronto Panhellenic		
Total		337	(80)

International career
1972–1976	Greece	6	(0)
- * Club domestic league appearances and goals as of January 2008

Kyriakos "Koulis" Apostolidis (Greek: Κυριάκος "Κούλης" Αποστολίδης; born 3 March 1946), also known as Kirk Apostolidis, is a Greek former international footballer. Best known for his longtime spell with PAOK Thessaloniki, he also played in the North American Soccer League (NASL) during his time in the United States, where he led the league in goals in 1970 and helped the Dallas Tornado win the 1971 NASL Championship.

== Playing career ==
=== Early career and college ===
Apostolidis joined PAOK youth ranks in 1959 and made his debut with the first team in 1963. In 1965, he left for the United States to study Computer Science and Business Administration at the University of San Francisco. Between 1965 and 1967, he played college soccer for the San Francisco Dons under coach Stephen Negoesco, and also for the Greek-American A.C. in the San Francisco amateur soccer league. In 1967, he was selected as an NCAA Division I first-team All-American.

=== Professional ===
In 1968, Apostolidis signed with the Vancouver Royals of the North American Soccer League. Following the dissolution of the Royals at the end of the season, he briefly featured in exhibition matches for the California Clippers in early 1969, before signing with the Dallas Tornado later that year. In 1969, he played as a defender and was named to the NASL All-Star First Team. In 1970, he moved to the front line. The move paid off immediately for the Tornado as Apostolidis led the league in goals (16) and tied with Carlos Metidieri for the points lead (35). He was also selected to the NASL All-Star Second Team. In 1971, he won the league title and finished fourth in goals, before ending his stint in the United States to return to Greece.

"PAOK is the greatest, most beautiful, and most fulfilling part of my life."

— Koulis Apostolidis
Bliatkas, Kostas. Giorgos Koudas - The game of my life. Ianos publications, 2005, p. 248.

Apostolidis returned to PAOK and played for eight seasons, winning two Greek Cups (1972, 1974), as well as the club's historic first-ever league title in 1976. In the 1974 Greek Cup final, he converted the decisive penalty in the shootout, clinching the trophy for White-blacks of the North. On 17 October 1979, a testimonial match was held in his honour at Toumba Stadium between PAOK and the Greece national team (4–2), where he was awarded by PAOK, the Hellenic Football Federation (HFF), the Panhellenic Footballers' Association (PSAP), and representatives of PAOK supporters' clubs.

In 1980, he played for Toronto Panhellenic in the Canadian National Soccer League.

=== National team ===
Apostolidis earned six caps with the Greece national team between 1972 and 1976. His first game on 16 February 1972 was a defeat to the Netherlands, 5–0. His last on 6 May 1976 was a win over Poland, 1–0. In the latter, he came on for Maik Galakos in the 63rd minute.

== Career statistics ==
=== Club career ===
Appearances and goals by club, season and competition
Club	Season	League			Cup		Continental		Total	
Club	Season	Division	Apps	Goals	Apps	Goals	Apps	Goals	Apps	Goals
PAOK	1963–64	Alpha Ethniki	15	2	2	2	–		17	4
PAOK	1964–65	Alpha Ethniki	27	6	2	0	–		29	6
PAOK	1965–66	Alpha Ethniki	1	0	0	0	2 (Note: Inter-Cities Fairs Cup apps.)	0	3	0
PAOK	Total		43	8	4	2	2	0	49	10
San Francisco Dons	1967	NCAA Division I			–		–			
Vancouver Royals	1968	NASL	7	0	–		–		7	0
Dallas Tornado	1969	NASL	15	2	–		–		15	2
Dallas Tornado	1970	NASL	19	16	–		–		19	16
Dallas Tornado	1971	NASL	15	11	–		–		15	11
Dallas Tornado	Total		49	29	–		–		49	29
PAOK	1971–72	Alpha Ethniki	34	12	6	5	–		40	17
PAOK	1972–73	Alpha Ethniki	33	15	5	1	2	0	40	16
PAOK	1973–74	Alpha Ethniki	32	3	5	0	5	0	42	3
PAOK	1974–75	Alpha Ethniki	30	5	4	1	2	0	36	6
PAOK	1975–76	Alpha Ethniki	29	5	2	0	2	0	33	5
PAOK	1976–77	Alpha Ethniki	30	3	4	1	3	0	37	4
PAOK	1977–78	Alpha Ethniki	31	0	5	1	3	0	39	1
PAOK	1978–79	Alpha Ethniki	19	0	1	0	2	0	22	0
PAOK	Total		238	43	32	9	19	0	289	52
PAOK total			281	51	36	11	21	0	338	62
Career total			337	80	36	11	21	0	394	91

Sources: RSSSF, Makedonia NLG Digital Library, NASL Jerseys, National Football Teams, uefa.com, worldfootball.net

=== International career ===
National team	Year	Caps
Greece
Greece	1972	2
Greece	1975	3
Greece	1976	1
Total		6

== Honours ==
Dallas Tornado

- North American Soccer League: 1971

PAOK

- Alpha Ethniki: 1975–76
- Greek Cup: 1971–72, 1973–74

Individual

- NCAA Division I First-Team All-American: 1967
- NASL All-Star First Team: 1969
- NASL Top Scorer: 1970
- NASL All-Star Second Team: 1970

== Bibliography ==
- Bliatkas, Kostas (2005). Γιώργος Κούδας, της ζωής μου το παιχνίδι [Giorgos Koudas, the game of my life] (in Greek). Greece: Ianos Publications. ISBN 978-960-7827-35-7.
- Pappous, Michalis (2019). Ο ΠΑΟΚ του '70 [The PAOK of the '70s] (in Greek). Greece: University Studio Press. ISBN 978-960-12-2421-3.
