= Dimitris Paridis =

Greek footballer (1945–2015)

Personal information
- Full name: Dimitrios Paridis
- Date of birth: 20 September 1945
- Place of birth: Agios Andreas, Pangaio, Kavala, Greece
- Date of death: 22 August 2015 (aged 69)
- Place of death: Agios Andreas, Pangaio, Kavala, Greece
- Height: 1.63 m (5 ft 4 in)
- Position: Winger

Youth career
- 1959–1965: AEK Kavala

Senior career*
Years	Team	Apps	(Gls)
1966–1968	Kavala		
1968–1977	PAOK	187	(49)

International career
1972–1975	Greece	6	(0)
- * Club domestic league appearances and goals

Dimitris Paridis (Greek: Δημήτρης Παρίδης; 20 September 1945 – 22 August 2015) was a former Greek international footballer who played as a winger for PAOK.

== Career ==
=== Club career ===
"Paridis was my alter ego on the pitch. As soon as I got the ball, he knew–even before I did–where I was going to send it, and he would position himself perfectly for the counterattack!"

— Giorgos Koudas
Bliatkas, Kostas. Giorgos Koudas - The game of my life. Ianos publications, 2005, p. 63.

Paridis was born in Agios Andreas, Kavala, to a family that hailed from Nicopolis in Pontus. He first started playing football for Keravnos Agios Andreas, a local football club. In 1961, he debuted for AEK Kavala which later merged with two other teams (Iraklis Kavala, Filippoi Kavala) to form a single team called Kavala, in order to focus the football power of the region better. The team later reached for two successive seasons in the Beta Ethniki the promotion play-offs (1966–68), but did not manage to get promoted to the top-tier Alpha Ethniki.

In the summer of 1968, he was transferred to PAOK, who fought with city-rivals Aris for his acquisition. He became a key member of the club's talented 1970s squad. Across 232 appearances in all competitions, he scored 70 goals and helped the team win two Greek Cups (1972, 1974) as well as the club's historic first-ever league title in 1976. Paridis was pivotal in the 1974 Greek Cup final against Olympiacos, scoring the equalizer to make it 1–1, earning the penalty for the 2–1 goal after being brought down in the box, and successfully converting his effort during the penalty shootout. He ended his career in December 1976, recording few appearances during his final two seasons with the team.

=== International career ===
Paridis had 6 caps for the Greece national team, between 1972 and 1975.

== Personal ==
Following the end of his football career, Paridis transitioned into music and performed a PAOK theme song, dedicated to his beloved club. On 22 August 2015, Paridis died after a long battle with cancer, aged 69. The stadium of Agios Andreas Kavala is named in his honor.

== Career statistics ==
=== Club career ===
Appearances and goals by club, season and competition
Club	Season	League			Cup		Continental		Total	
Club	Season	Division	Apps	Goals	Apps	Goals	Apps	Goals	Apps	Goals
Kavala	1966–67	Beta Ethniki					–			
Kavala	1967–68	Beta Ethniki			0	0	–			
Kavala	Total						–			
PAOK	1968–69	Alpha Ethniki	29	7	3	3	–		32	10
PAOK	1969–70	Alpha Ethniki	27	8	5	2	–		32	10
PAOK	1970–71	Alpha Ethniki	29	4	5	4	2 (Note: Inter-Cities Fairs Cup apps.)	0	36	8
PAOK	1971–72	Alpha Ethniki	28	5	2	1	–		30	6
PAOK	1972–73	Alpha Ethniki	22	9	6	3	2	0	30	12
PAOK	1973–74	Alpha Ethniki	25	10	6	5	6	3	37	18
PAOK	1974–75	Alpha Ethniki	23	6	3	0	0	0	26	6
PAOK	1975–76	Alpha Ethniki	1	0	2	0	2	0	5	0
PAOK	1976–77	Alpha Ethniki	3	0	0	0	1	0	4	0
PAOK	Total		187	49	32	18	13	3	232	70

Sources: RSSSF, Makedonia NLG Digital Library, uefa.com, worldfootball.net

=== International career ===
National team	Year	Caps
Greece
Greece	1972	3
Greece	1973	1
Greece	1975	2
Total		6

== Honours ==
PAOK

- Alpha Ethniki: 1975–76
- Greek Cup: 1971–72, 1973–74

== Bibliography ==
- Bliatkas, Kostas (2005). Γιώργος Κούδας, της ζωής μου το παιχνίδι [Giorgos Koudas, the game of my life] (in Greek). Greece: Ianos Publications. ISBN 978-960-7827-35-7.
- Pappous, Michalis (2019). Ο ΠΑΟΚ του '70 [The PAOK of the '70s] (in Greek). Greece: University Studio Press. ISBN 978-960-12-2421-3.
