= Konstantinos Iosifidis =

Greek footballer

Kostas Iosifidis
Personal information
- Full name: Konstantinos Iosifidis
- Date of birth: 14 January 1952 (age 74)
- Place of birth: Vyroneia, Serres, Greece
- Position: Left back

Youth career
- –1967: Anagennisi Neou Petritsiou
- 1968–1971: Elpida Toumba

Senior career*
Years	Team	Apps	(Gls)
1971–1985	PAOK	397	(5)

International career
1974–1982	Greece	51	(2)

Managerial career
- 1994–1996: Apollon Kalamarias
- 1997: Naoussa
- 1997–1998: Kavala (A' Division)
- 1998: Apollon Kalamarias
- 1998–1999: Ialysos
- 1999: Kilkisiakos
- 2000: ΑΕ Ampelokipi
- 2000–2001: Kavala
- 2001–2002: Kalamata
- 2002: Apollon Kalamarias
- 2002–2003: Panserraikos
- 2004: Kavala
- 2005–2021: PAOK U19 (General Manager)
- 2021–2024: PAOK B (General Manager)
- * Club domestic league appearances and goals

Konstantinos Iosifidis (Greek: Κωνσταντίνος Ιωσηφίδης; born 14 January 1952) is a former Greek international footballer who played as a left back and spent his entire career from 1971 to 1985 at PAOK.

== Career ==
=== Playing career ===
==== Club career ====
"Iosifidis began his career with the team at a very young age and, back in the early 1970s, embodied the concept of the modern full-back–one who frequently pushed forward into attack, delivered crosses to the forwards, and generally contributed to the team’s attacking duties."

— Giorgos Koudas
Bliatkas, Kostas. Giorgos Koudas - The game of my life. Ianos publications, 2005, p. 152.

Iosifidis took his first steps in football at Anagennisi Neou Petritsiou in the prefecture of Serres. In 1967, at the age of 15, he came to Thessaloniki, found a job in an electrical goods store and shortly after joined the Elpida Toumbas team. Kleanthis Vikelidis recognized his talent and invited him for a trial with the Greek National Amateur Team. He was soon called up to the Greek Youth National Team as well, which attracted the interest of PAOK. Two PAOK administrative members at the time, Sofoklis Martinidis and Vasilis Sergiannidis, had a significant contribution to the fulfilling of his transfer in June 1971 for twenty thousand drachmas. Iosifidis spent his entire football career at the Double-headed eagle of the North and wore the No 4 white-black jersey for 14 years, retiring in 1985. He is PAOK 2nd all-time appearance maker with 494 games in total (397 in the league), behind only the legendary Giorgos Koudas. He was the first player in the club's history who won 4 domestic titles with the White-blacks of the North, being a member of the squad that won the 1972 and 1974 Cups and the 1976 and 1985 Greek league titles, captaining the team in the latter. His achievement was surpassed by Vieirinha in 2024, who won 5 trophies with PAOK (2 Championships, 3 Cups) and became the all-time most decorated player of the club.

==== International career ====
Iosifidis made his international debut on 28 April 1974, in the away friendly match against the then world champions Brazil, which ended 0–0 and was held at the iconic Maracanã Stadium in Rio de Janeiro. He had 51 caps and scored 2 goals for the Greece national team, between 1974 and 1982, and participated in the UEFA Euro 1980.

==== Style of play ====
Iosifidis was a complete full-back, being able to contribute at both ends of the pitch. He could defend well, limiting down the opposition's wingers and also support the attack, as he had a high work rate, great stamina and excellent crossing ability.

=== Managerial career ===
After retiring, he managed several teams in Greece, such as Polykastro, Anagennisi Karditsa, PAONE, Anagennisi Kolindrou (Division C), Apollon Kalamarias, Naoussa, Ialysos Rodou, Kalamata (Division B) and Kavala (Division A).

Since 2005, he is the general manager of PAOK.

== Career statistics ==
=== Club career ===
Appearances and goals by season and competition
Club	Season	Greek League		Greek Cup		Continental		Total	
Club	Season	Apps	Goals	Apps	Goals	Apps	Goals	Apps	Goals
PAOK	1971–72	32	0	5	0	–		37	0
PAOK	1972–73	25	0	5	0	2	0	32	0
PAOK	1973–74	29	0	5	0	6	0	40	0
PAOK	1974–75	33	0	4	0	2	0	39	0
PAOK	1975–76	29	0	3	0	2	0	34	0
PAOK	1976–77	33	2	4	0	4	0	41	2
PAOK	1977–78	33	1	6	1	4	0	43	2
PAOK	1978–79	31	0	2	0	2	0	35	0
PAOK	1979–80	33	0	7	1	–		40	1
PAOK	1980–81	31	0	9	0	–		40	0
PAOK	1981–82	33	2	7	0	2	0	42	2
PAOK	1982–83	21	0	3	0	4	0	28	0
PAOK	1983–84	17	0	6	0	0	0	23	0
PAOK	1984–85	17	0	3	1	–		20	1
Career total		397	5	69	3	28	0	494	8

Sources: RSSSF, Makedonia NLG Digital Library, uefa.com, worldfootball.net

=== International career ===
National team	Year	Caps	Goals
Greece
Greece	1974	6	0
Greece	1975	3	1
Greece	1976	1	0
Greece	1977	8	0
Greece	1978	8	0
Greece	1979	4	0
Greece	1980	9	0
Greece	1981	8	1
Greece	1982	4	0
Total		51	2

List of international goals scored by Kostas Iosifidis
No.	Date	Venue	Opponent	Score	Result	Competition
1	4 June 1975	Toumba Stadium, Thessaloniki	Malta	3–0	4–0	UEFA Euro 1976 qualifying
2	15 April 1981	Makario Stadium, Nicosia	Cyprus	1–0	1–0	Friendly

== Honours ==
PAOK

- Alpha Ethniki: 1975–76, 1984–85
- Greek Cup: 1971–72, 1973–74

Individual

- PAOK 2nd all-time appearance maker: 494 games
- PAOK 2nd all-time league appearance maker : 397 games

== See also ==
- List of one-club men in association football

== Bibliography ==
- Bliatkas, Kostas (2005). Γιώργος Κούδας, της ζωής μου το παιχνίδι [Giorgos Koudas, the game of my life] (in Greek). Greece: Ianos Publications. ISBN 978-960-7827-35-7.
- Pappous, Michalis (2019). Ο ΠΑΟΚ του '70 [The PAOK of the '70s] (in Greek). Greece: University Studio Press. ISBN 978-960-12-2421-3.
