= József Becsei =

Hungarian footballer (1950–2013)

Personal information
- Date of birth: 10 October 1950
- Place of birth: Budapest, PR Hungary
- Date of death: 24 November 2013 (aged 63)
- Place of death: Budapest, Hungary
- Position: Forward

Senior career*
Years	Team	Apps	(Gls)
1969–1976	MTK Budapest		

International career
1974	Hungary	1	(0)
- * Club domestic league appearances and goals

József Becsei (10 October 1950 – 24 November 2013) was a Hungarian professional footballer who played as a forward for MTK Budapest. (Note: József Becsei at WorldFootball.net) (Note: József Becsei at National-Football-Teams.com) He died on 24 November 2013, aged 63, in Budapest, Hungary.
