= Emilios Theofanidis =

Greek footballer

- Emilios Theofanidis with AEK Athens

Personal information
- Full name: Emilios Theofanidis
- Date of birth: 30 November 1939
- Place of birth: Ptolemaida, Greece
- Date of death: 7 February 1999 (aged 59)
- Place of death: Ptolemaida, Greece
- Positions: Midfielder; defender

Youth career
- 1953–1957: Aris Ptolemaida

Senior career*
Years	Team	Apps	(Gls)
1957–1963	Aris Ptolemaida		
1963–1965	AEK Athens	6	(0)
1965–1970	PAOK	145	
Total		151	
- * Club domestic league appearances and goals

Emilios Theofanidis (Greek: Αιμίλιος Θεοφανίδης; 30 November 1939 – 7 February 1999) was a Greek professional footballer who played as midfielder and a later manager.

== Club career ==
Theofanidis started football in 1953 at Aris Ptolemaida, where he distinguished himself competing in the second division, while in 1963 he emerged as the top scorer in his respective group.

In the summer of 1963, he took the big step of his career by transferring to the Greek champions, AEK Athens. With the yellow-blacks, he played for 2 years, making his debut in the first division and remarkably, participated in both matches against Monaco for the qualifying phase of the European Cup, even scoring and 1 goal in the second leg in Athens on 2 October 1963 which ended 1–1. During his spell in the club he won a Greek Cup in 1964.

In the summer of 1965, he was transferred to PAOK, where he played for 5 seasons and played in the first 2 European matches in the history of the club against the Wiener Sport-Club for the Inter-Cities Fairs Cup in 1965. He was also a finalist of the Greek Cup in the period 1970.

== After football ==
After the end of his football career Theofanidis worked as a coach and among other things, in the infrastructure departments of PAOK and at Aris Ptolemaida He died on 7 February 1999 at the age of 59. The Municipal Stadium of Ptolemaida has been named in his honor.

== Honours ==
AEK Athens

- Greek Cup: 1963–64

Individual

- Beta Ethniki top scorer: 1962–63 (4th Group)
