= Giannis Gounaris =

Greek footballer and coach

Personal information
- Full name: Ioannis Gounaris
- Date of birth: 6 July 1952 (age 74)
- Place of birth: Thessaloniki, Greece
- Position: Right back

Youth career
- 1967–1970: Doxa Neapoli

Senior career*
Years	Team	Apps	(Gls)
1970–1982	PAOK	376	(8)
1982–1985	Olympiacos	50	(1)
1985–1987	Makedonikos		
Total		426	(9)

International career
1971–1983	Greece	27	(0)

Managerial career
- 1987: Olympiacos (assistant)
- 1989: Olympiacos
- 1989–1990: Xanthi
- 1991–1992: Xanthi
- 1992: PAOK
- 1994: Xanthi
- 1994–1995: Doxa Dramas
- 1996: Panionios
- 1996: Kastoria
- 1998: Panserraikos
- 2005: Niki Volos
- 2006: PAS Giannina
- 2006: Panthrakikos
- 2007: Lamia
- 2007–2008: PAS Preveza
- 2009: Anagennisi Giannitsa
- * Club domestic league appearances and goals

Giannis Gounaris (Greek: Γιάννης Γούναρης; born 6 July 1952) is a Greek retired footballer and coach.

== Career ==
=== Playing career ===
Born in Neapoli, Thessaloniki, Gounaris was a right wing-back with a good crossing ability who played twelve years for PAOK and three years for Olympiacos from 1970 to 1985. He had 27 caps for the Greece national team and participated in the UEFA Euro 1980. He was also a member of the Greece U23 squad that won the Balkan Youth Championship in 1971.

In 1970, Gounaris was acquired by PAOK from Doxa Neapoli and he quickly became known for his plowing runs down the whole right wing, transitioning defence into offence. His partnership with PAOK's left full-back Kostas Iosifidis became formidable not only for PAOK, but for the Greek national team as well. Gounaris was a vital member of the squad that won PAOK's first ever league title in 1976. He participated in seven Greek Cup finals with the White-blacks of the North, winning the trophy in 1972 and 1974. In the summer of 1982, his twelve-year contract expired and he moved to rivals Olympiacos. Despite the acrimony surrounding his transfer and subsequent comments, Gounaris' tenure in the 1970s was foundational to the team's success, cementing his legacy as a prominent former player of the club. Gounaris is PAOK 3rd all-time appearance maker with 457 games in total (376 in the league). With Olympiacos, he won the league title in 1983 and earned the appreciation of Olympiacos fans when he played with a broken arm in a Cup derby against Panathinaikos. He ended his career with Makedonikos in 1987.

=== Managerial career ===
After his retirement as a football player, Gounaris pursued a managerial career. In November 1987, he was assigned by Olympiacos president Giorgos Koskotas as assistant manager and was sitting on the bench on Olympiacos 6–1 record league defeat by PAOK on 6 December 1987. He was promoted to manager at the end of the following season and then took the reins of Xanthi for 2 seasons in the early 1990s. In 1992, PAOK president Thomas Voulinos assigned him as manager and the team reached the two-legged 1992 Cup final after an impressive 3–0 (aet) second leg semi-final win over AEK Athens. PAOK lost 3–1 on aggregate to Olympiacos in the final. On 24 May 1992 (matchday 32), with Gounaris at the helm, PAOK lost 1–2 to Olympiacos at Toumba Stadium and suffered their first home defeat from their rivals after a 24-game unbeaten run (21 wins/3 draws – 21 league matches/3 cup matches – goals 52/12) which lasted for 23 years.

== Career statistics ==
=== Club career ===
Career total statistics
Club	Years	Greek League		Greek Cup		Continental (Note: Includes the Inter-Cities Fairs Cup apps.)		Total	
Club	Years	Apps	Goals	Apps	Goals	Apps	Goals	Apps	Goals
PAOK	1970–1982	376	8	59	0	22	0	457	8
Olympiacos	1982–1985	50	1	8	0	8	0	66	1
Career total		426	9	67	0	30	0	523	9

=== International career ===
National team	Year	Caps
Greece
Greece	1971	2
Greece	1975	1
Greece	1976	2
Greece	1979	3
Greece	1980	5
Greece	1981	4
Greece	1982	6
Greece	1983	4
Total		27

== Honours ==
PAOK

- Alpha Ethniki: 1975–76
- Greek Cup: 1971–72, 1973–74

Olympiacos

- Alpha Ethniki: 1982–83

Greece U23

- Balkan Youth Championship: 1971

Individual

- PAOK 3rd all-time appearance maker: 457 games
- PAOK 3rd all-time league appearance maker : 376 games
