= Giannis Giakoumis =

Greek footballer and manager (1940–1986)

Personal information
- Full name: Ioannis Giakoumis
- Date of birth: 1940
- Place of birth: Thessaloniki, Greece
- Date of death: 20 February 1986 (aged 45–46)
- Place of death: Xanthi, Greece
- Position: Attacking midfielder

Youth career
- –1960: PAO Dioikitiriou

Senior career*
Years	Team	Apps	(Gls)
1960–1970	PAOK	252	(41)
1970–1974	Naoussa		
1974–1976	Panetolikos	18	(5)
Total		280	(46)

Managerial career
- 1976–1977: Naoussa
- 1978: Almopos Aridea
- 1979–1981: Panetolikos
- 1982–1984: Xanthi
- 1986: Xanthi
- * Club domestic league appearances and goals

Giannis Giakoumis (Greek: Γιάννης Γιακουμής; 1940 – 20 February 1986) was a Greek footballer who played as an attacking midfielder. He also pursued a managerial career.

== Club career ==
Born in Thessaloniki, Giakoumis began his football career at PAO Dioikitiriou. In 1960, he was acquired by PAOK and wore the white-black jersey for ten years (1960–70), playing as an attacking midfielder. He made a total of 252 league appearances scoring 41 goals with the White-blacks of the North.

In the summer of 1970, he moved along with his teammate Toulis Mouratidis to Naoussa. In 1974, he joined Panetolikos and ended his career two years later, playing his last season in the top-tier Alpha Ethniki.

== Managerial career ==
After his retirement from active football, Giakoumis pursued a managerial career, having worked at Naoussa, Almopos Aridea (1978), Panetolikos (1979–81) and Xanthi (1982–84 and 1986). During his tenure at Panetolikos, he suggested to PAOK president Giorgos Pantelakis the signing of Christos Dimopoulos.

== Death ==
Giakoumis suffered a heart attack and died on 20 February 1986, aged 46, while coaching Xanthi from the bench during a game against Kozani (1–0). Three months after his passing, a testimonial match was held in his honour between Xanthi and PAOK that ended 3–4.
