= Makedonia (newspaper) =

Greek daily newspaper

- Type: political newspaper
- Format: Compact (Tabloid)
- Founded: 1911
- Political alignment: Centre
- Headquarters: 85 Monastiriou Avenue, central Thessaloniki, Greece
- Website: Makedonia Website

Makedonia (Macedonia, Greek: Μακεδονία) is a Greek daily newspaper published in Thessaloniki. Being one of the oldest newspapers in Greece, it was first published in 1911 by Konstantinos Vellidis. The present owner is the company Makedoniki Ekdotiki Ektipotiki AE. Currently, director of the newspaper is Dimitrios Gousidis, the 7th in the last 12 years. Previous directors were Lazaros Chatzinakos, Ioannis Kotofolos, Traianos Chatzidimitriou, Loukas Katsonis, Pantelis Savvidis and Kostas Zouraris.
