= Christos Terzanidis =

Greek footballer (born 1945)

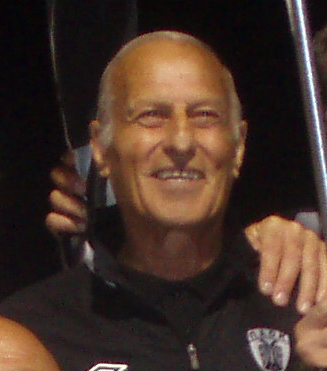
- Terzanidis in 2017

Personal information
- Full name: Christos Terzanidis
- Date of birth: 13 February 1945 (age 81)
- Place of birth: Melissokomeio Kavala, Greece
- Position: Defensive midfielder

Youth career
- 1958–1960: Filippoi Kavalas

Senior career*
Years	Team	Apps	(Gls)
1963–1968	Orfeas Eleftheroupoli		
1968–1977	PAOK	237	(15)
1977–1981	Panathinaikos	83	(10)
1981–1983	Makedonikos	12	(0)
Total		332	(25)

International career
1973–1980	Greece	27	(1)

Managerial career
- 1983–1984: Trikala
- 1984–1986: Niki Volos
- 1990–1991: PAOK
- 1994–1995: E.A. Rethymniakou
- 1995: Kavala
- 1995–1996: Ialysos
- 1996–1997: Apollon Kalamarias
- 1997–1998: Anagennisi Karditsas
- * Club domestic league appearances and goals

Christos Terzanidis (Greek: Χρήστος Τερζανίδης; born 13 February 1945) is a Greek former international footballer who played as a defensive midfielder.

== Playing career ==
=== Club career ===
Born in Melissokomeio, Kavala, Terzanidis began his career at Filippoi Kavalas when he was 13 years old. He had to temporarily quit football after two years and worked in tobacco fields in order to support his family's income. He later joined Orfeas Eleftheroupoli and in the summer of 1968 he moved to PAOK. Terzanidis was a physical and disciplined defensive midfielder, being able to contribute at both ends of the pitch, as he had a high work rate, great stamina and a good right foot shot. He quickly became irreplaceable in the midfield alongside Stavros Sarafis and Giorgos Koudas who were both able to focus more on the attack thanks to his endless runs. Terzanidis was a vital member of the squad that won PAOK's first ever league title in 1976. He participated in six Greek Cup finals with the White-blacks of the North, winning the trophy in 1972 and 1974 and made a total of 237 league appearances scoring 15 goals.

In the summer of 1977, his contract expired and he moved to rivals Panathinaikos. He ended his career at Makedonikos in 1983. He was a member of the squad in 1982–83 season, which was the only season in the club's history that the team participated in the top-tier Alpha Ethniki. Makedonikos lost 3–2 to Panionios in a relegation play-off match that was held at Volos Municipal Stadium.

=== International career ===
Terzanidis had 27 caps for the Greece national team between 1973 and 1980, scoring 1 goal. He participated in the UEFA Euro 1980 that was held in Italy.

National team	Year	Caps	Goals
Greece
Greece	1973	4	0
Greece	1974	7	1
Greece	1975	3	0
Greece	1977	3	0
Greece	1978	6	0
Greece	1980	4	0
Total		27	1

International goal scored by Christos Terzanidis
No.	Date	Venue	Opponent	Score	Result	Competition
1	15 November 1974	Karaiskakis Stadium, Piraeus	Cyprus	3–1	3–1	Friendly

== Managerial career ==
After his retirement from active football, he pursued a managerial career, having worked at Trikala, Niki Volos, PAOK, EAR, Kavala, Ialysos Rhodes, Apollon Kalamarias and Anagennisi Karditsas.

== Honours ==
PAOK

- Alpha Ethniki: 1975–76
- Greek Cup: 1971–1972, 1973–1974

Panathinaikos

- Balkans Cup: 1977

Makedonikos

- Beta Ethniki: 1981–82

== Bibliography ==
- Bliatkas, Kostas (2005). Γιώργος Κούδας, της ζωής μου το παιχνίδι [Giorgos Koudas, the game of my life] (in Greek). Greece: Ianos Publications. ISBN 978-960-7827-35-7.
- Pappous, Michalis (2019). Ο ΠΑΟΚ του '70 [The PAOK of the '70s] (in Greek). Greece: University Studio Press. ISBN 978-960-12-2421-3.
