= Serres Municipal Stadium =

Football stadium in Serres, Greece

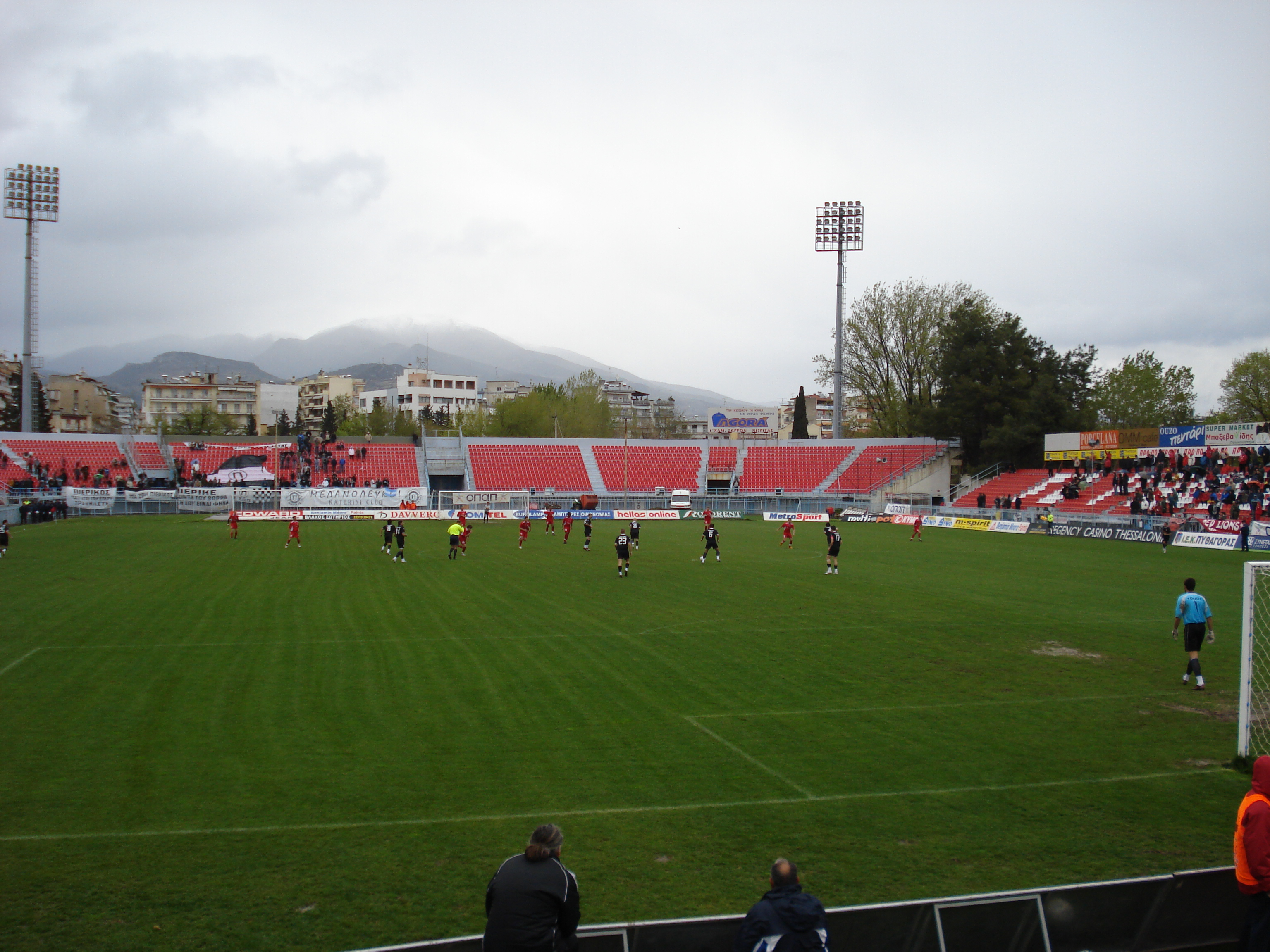
- Interactive map of Serres Municipal Stadium
- Full name: Serres Municipal Stadium
- Location: Serres, Greece
- Coordinates: 41.0847°N 23.5466°E
- Owner: Municipality of Serres
- Operator: Panserraikos
- Capacity: 9,500
- Surface: Grass

Construction
- Built: 1926
- Renovated: 1976

Tenant
- Panserraikos (1926-present)

The Serres Municipal Stadium (Greek: Δημοτικό Στάδιο Σερρών, romanized: Dhimotiko Stadio Serron) is a multi-purpose stadium in Serres, Greece. It is currently used mostly for football matches and is the home stadium of Panserraikos. The stadium holds 9,500, was built in 1926 and renovated numerous times. The record attendance of the stadium was on 25 June 1972, when 14,200 spectators watched Panserraikos 1–1 draw against AEL for the Beta Ethniki 1971–72 season last match, a result that gave the chance to Panserraikos to get the promotion to Alpha Ethniki.

It hosted the final of the 1988–89 Balkans Cup where OFI defeated Yugoslav side Radnički Niš.
