= 1971–72 Greek Football Cup =

1971–72 Greek Cup
Tournament details
- Country: Greece
- Teams: 76

Final positions
- Champions: PAOK (1st title)
- Runners-up: Panathinaikos

Tournament statistics
- Matches played: 73
- Goals scored: 199 (2.73 per match)

The 1971–72 Greek Football Cup was the 30th edition of the Greek Football Cup. The competition culminated with the Greek Cup Final, held at Karaiskakis Stadium, on 5 July 1972. The match was contested by PAOK and Panathinaikos, with PAOK winning by 2–1.

== Calendar ==
Round	Date(s)	Fixtures	Clubs	New entries
First Round	29 August 1971	38	76 → 38	76
Second Round	5 December 1971	18	38 → 19	none
Additional Round		2	19 → 16	none
Round of 16	8 March 1972	8	16 → 8	none
Quarter-finals	1972	4	8 → 4	none
Semi-finals	1972	2	4 → 2	none
Final	5 July 1972	1	2 → 1	none

== Knockout phase ==
In the knockout phase, teams play against each other over a single match. If the match ends up as a draw, extra time will be played. If a winner doesn't occur after the extra time the winner emerges by penalty shoot-out.
The mechanism of the draws for each round is as follows:

- In the draw for the first round, the teams from the first division are seeded and the teams from the second division were unseeded. The seeded teams are drawn against the unseeded teams in each region.
- In the draws for the second round onwards, there are no seedings and teams from the different region can be drawn against each other.

== First round ==
Team 1	Score	Team 2
Panathinaikos	9–1	Orfeas Egaleo
AEK Athens	4–1	P.A.O. Rouf
Koropi	2–0	Panelefsiniakos
Panaspropyrgiakos	1–2	Atromitos Piraeus
Olympiacos	5–0	Ethnikos Asteras
Vyzas Megara	1–0	Kallithea
Atromitos	2–2 (5–4 p)	Proodeftiki
Acharnaikos	0–0 (4–3 p)	Ethnikos Piraeus
Fostiras	3–0	Ikaros Nea Smyrni
Pannafpliakos	0–1	Apollon Athens
Panionios	4–0	Panarkadikos
Paniliakos	1–2 (a.e.t.)	Ionikos
Panegialios	1–2	Aias Salamina
Olympiakos Nicosia	0–1	Egaleo
Argonaftis	2–0	Chania
Korinthos	1–0	Kalamata
Leonidas Sparta	1–3	Panachaiki
OFI	1–0 (a.e.t.)	Rodos
Lamia	3–0	Orchomenos
Panetolikos	1–0	Anagennisi Arta
PAS Giannina	4–2	Karditsa A.C.
Anagennisi Karditsa	1–1 (3–4 p)	Trikala
Olympiacos Volos	5–2	Levadiakos
Pierikos	4–1	AEL
Naoussa	3–3 (4–2 p)	Veria
Pyrsos Grevena	0–4	Kozani
Florina	0–2	Kastoria
PAOK	5–1	Foinikas Polichni
Aris	4–0	Apollon Krya Vrysi
Iraklis	2–0	Pandramaikos
Edessaikos	3–0	Apollon Kalamarias
Kilkisiakos	1–0 (a.e.t.)	Makedonikos
Doxa Drama	0–1	Panserraikos
Xanthi	1–0 (a.e.t.)	Kavala
Panthrakikos	1–0	Orestis Orestiada
Aris Ptolemaida	1–0	Anagennisi Giannitsa
Kerkyra	0–0 (4–1 p)	A.F.C. Patra
Panargiakos	0–0 (1–3 p)	Niki Volos

== Second round ==
Team 1	Score	Team 2
PAOK	3–1	Pierikos
Panathinaikos	3–0	Xanthi
Panionios	3–2	Ionikos
Panetolikos	0–3	Aris
Trikala	3–0	Edessaikos
OFI	1–0 (a.e.t.)	Kastoria
Panachaiki	4–1	Naoussa
Apollon Athens	1–0	Olympiacos Volos
AEK Athens	4–0	Kozani
Aris Ptolemaida	1–0 (a.e.t.)	Vyzas Megara
Olympiacos	2–0 (a.e.t.)	Egaleo
PAS Giannina	1–0	Panserraikos
Atromitos	1–2	Panthrakikos
Iraklis	1–0 (a.e.t.)	Fostiras
Kilkisiakos	2–0 (w/o)	Kerkyra
Niki Volos	1–2	Argonaftis
Atromitos Piraeus	1–2	Koropi
Aias Salamina	?	Acharnaikos
Lamia	?	Korinthos

== Additional round ==
Team 1	Score	Team 2
Iraklis	0–0 (2–4 p)	Panionios
Panachaiki	2–0 (w/o)	Kilkisiakos
Olympiacos	5–0	Argonaftis

== Bracket ==
Round of 16
Olympiacos	1
Aris	2
PAOK	2
Aias Salamina	0
OFI	2
Koropi	1
Lamia (a.e.t.)	1
AEK Athens	0
Trikala	1
PAS Giannina	0
Apollon Athens	0
Panathinaikos	1
Panionios	5
Aris Ptolemaida	1
Panachaiki	2
Panthrakikos	0

Quarter-finals
Aris	1
PAOK	2
OFI	0(2)
Lamia (p)	0(4)
Trikala	2
Panathinaikos	6
Panionios	3
Panachaiki	2

Semi-finals
PAOK	2
Lamia	0
Panathinaikos	2
Panionios	0

Final
PAOK	2
Panathinaikos	1

== Round of 16 ==
Team 1	Score	Team 2
PAOK	2–0	Aias Salamina
Apollon Athens	0–1	Panathinaikos
Lamia	1–0 (a.e.t.)	AEK Athens
Panionios	5–1	Aris Ptolemaida
Olympiacos	1–2	Aris
Trikala	1–0	PAS Giannina
OFI	2–1	Koropi
Panachaiki	2–0	Panthrakikos

== Quarter-finals ==
Team 1	Score	Team 2
Aris	1–2^{*}	PAOK
Trikala	2–6	Panathinaikos
OFI	0–0 (2–4 p)	Lamia
Panionios	3–2	Panachaiki

^{*}The match was suspended at 89th minute because Aris' players started a fight with the referee. That remained as the final score.

== Semi-finals ==
Team 1	Score	Team 2
PAOK	2–0	Lamia
Panathinaikos	2–0	Panionios

== Final ==
5 July 1972
20:30 EET

PAOK	2–1	Panathinaikos
Koudas 2', 88'	Report (page 1)	Papadimitriou 89'

Karaiskakis Stadium, Piraeus
Attendance: 34,831
Referee: Christos Michas (Athens)
