= 1979–80 PAOK FC season =

PAOK
1979–80 season
- President: Giorgos Pantelakis
- Manager: Egon Piechaczek; Gyula Lóránt
- Stadium: Toumba Stadium
- Alpha Ethniki: 5th
- Greek Cup: Semi-finals
- Top goalscorer: League: Giorgos Kostikos (16); All: Giorgos Kostikos (18)
- Highest home attendance: 42,795 vs Aris

The 1979–80 season was PAOK Football Club's 54th in existence and the club's 21st consecutive season in the top flight of Greek football. The team entered the Greek Football Cup in first round.

== Players ==
=== Squad ===
Note: Flags indicate national team as defined under FIFA eligibility rules; some limited exceptions apply. Players may hold more than one non-FIFA nationality.

No.	Pos.	Nation	Player
—	GK	YUG	Mladen Furtula
—	GK	GRE	Apostolos Filis
—	DF	GRE	Kostas Iosifidis
—	DF	GRE	Ioannis Gounaris
—	DF	GRE	Filotas Pellios
—	DF	GRE	Theodoros Apostolidis
—	DF	GRE	Nikos Alavantas
—	DF	GRE	Apostolos Tsourelas
—	MF	GRE	Giorgos Koudas (captain)
—	MF	GRE	Stavros Sarafis

No.	Pos.	Nation	Player
—	MF	GRE	Angelos Anastasiadis
—	MF	GRE	Ioannis Damanakis
—	MF	GRE	Thomas Singas
—	MF	GRE	Vasilios Vasilakos
—	MF	GRE	Kyriakos Alexandridis
—	FW	GRE	Giorgos Kostikos
—	FW	GRE	Kostas Orfanos
—	FW	GRE	Panagiotis Kermanidis
—	FW	BRA	Neto Guerino

== Transfers ==
Players transferred in

Transfer Window	Pos.	Name	Club	Fee
Summer	DF	(Greece) Apostolos Tsourelas	(Greece) AE Pylaia	1 million Dr.
Summer	MF	(Greece) Vasilios Vasilakos	(Greece) Almyros	1.4 million Dr.

Players transferred out

Transfer Window	Pos.	Name	Club
Summer	MF	(Greece) Koulis Apostolidis	Retired

== Pre-season ==
Win Draw Loss

25 July 1979 Friendly	Wuppertaler SV	1–1	PAOK	West Germany
	Fagot 61' (penalty missed) 65'		Sarafis 57'

27 July 1979 Friendly	Ingolstadt	3–2	PAOK	West Germany
			Damanakis; Guerino

29 July 1979 Friendly	Schwabach	1–6	PAOK	West Germany
			Kermanidis; Anastasiadis; Alavantas; Roussos

31 July 1979 Friendly	Kickers Offenbach	0–0	PAOK	West Germany

2 August 1979 Friendly	TSV Asperg	0–0	PAOK	West Germany
Note: PAOK used reserve squad players.

6 August 1979 Friendly	Eintracht Frankfurt	3–2	PAOK	West Germany
	Lottermann 13'; Borchers 73'; Nachtweih 75'		Vasilakos 64'; Guerino 89'

20 August 1979 Friendly	PAOK	1–4	Eintracht Frankfurt	Thessaloniki
	Kermanidis 31'		Schaub 16', 35', 66'; Nickel 89'	Stadium: Toumba Stadium; Referee: Vassaras

22 August 1979 Friendly	PAOK	4–1	Iraklis	Thessaloniki
	Orfanos 43', 63'; Damanakis 50'; Kostikos 66'		Gesios 3'	Stadium: Toumba Stadium; Referee: Rammos

26 August 1979 Friendly	PAOK	2–1	Aris	Thessaloniki
	Guerino 51'; Orfanos 59'		Pallas 85' (pen.)	Stadium: Toumba Stadium; Referee: Rammos

29 August 1979 Friendly	Olympiacos	2–0	PAOK	Piraeus
	Galakos 19'; Novoselac 74'			Stadium: Karaiskakis Stadium

2 September 1979 Friendly	PAOK	3–2	AEK Athens	Thessaloniki
20:00 EEST (UTC+3)	Vasilakos 50', 65'; Damanakis 85'	Report	Ardizoglou 33', 67'	Stadium: Toumba Stadium; Attendance: 20,000; Referee: Abatzis (Thessaloniki)

16 September 1979 Friendly	PAOK	5–1	Panathinaikos	Thessaloniki
	Kermanidis 27', 31'; Alexandridis 57', 81'; Kostikos 63'		Eleftheriadis 86' (pen.)	Stadium: Toumba Stadium; Referee: Sapatakidis

21 September 1979 Friendly	PAOK	10–0	Almyros	Thessaloniki
	Guerino 3', 39'; Kostikos 11', 29', 46'; Alexandridis 13'; Singas 58', 67'; Kermanidis 65'; Roussos 74'			Stadium: Toumba Stadium; Referee: Tikmoglou

23 September 1979 Friendly	PAOK	1–2	Panionios	Thessaloniki
	Sarafis 63' (pen.)		Anastopoulos 17', 55'	Stadium: Toumba Stadium; Referee: Kontzalis

== Competitions ==
=== Overview ===
Competition	Record							
Competition	Pld	W	D	L	GF	GA	GD	Win %
Alpha Ethniki	34	17	7	10	53	33	+20	50.00
Greek Cup	7	4	1	2	12	4	+8	57.14
Total	41	21	8	12	65	37	+28	51.22

Source: Competitions

=== Managerial statistics ===
Head coach	From	To	Record							
Head coach	From	To	G	W	D	L	GF	GA	GD	Win %
(Poland) Egon Piechaczek	Start of season	27.04.1980	35	19	6	10	60	32	+28	54.29
(Hungary) Gyula Lóránt	30.04.1980	End of season	6	2	2	2	5	5	+0	33.33

== Alpha Ethniki ==
=== Standings ===
Pos	Team	Pld	W	D	L	GF	GA	GD	Pts	Qualification or relegation
3	Panathinaikos	34	15	15	4	38	24	+14	45 (Note: 3rd-place play-off: Panathinaikos–AEK Athens 1–0)	Qualification for UEFA Cup first round
4	AEK Athens	34	18	9	7	64	39	+25	45	
5	PAOK	34	17	7	10	53	33	+20	41	
6	PAS Giannina	34	14	9	11	50	44	+6	37	
7	Ethnikos Piraeus	34	13	10	11	44	31	+13	36	

Source: RSSSF
Rules for classification: 1st points; 2nd decision match; 3rd head-to-head goal difference.

==== Results summary ====
Overall								Home						Away					
Pld	W	D	L	GF	GA	GD	Pts	W	D	L	GF	GA	GD	W	D	L	GF	GA	GD
34	17	7	10	53	33	+20	58	15	1	1	43	11	+32	2	6	9	10	22	−12

Last updated: 18 May 1980.
Source: Competitive matches

==== Results by round ====
Round	1	2	3	4	5	6	7	8	9	10	11	12	13	14	15	16	17	18	19	20	21	22	23	24	25	26	27	28	29	30	31	32	33	34
Ground	H	A	H	H	A	H	A	A	H	H	A	H	A	H	A	A	H	A	H	A	A	H	A	H	H	A	H	A	H	A	H	Α	H	Α
Result	W	L	W	W	D	W	D	W	W	W	L	W	D	W	D	L	W	W	W	L	L	W	D	L	W	L	W	L	W	L	D	D	W	L
Position	1	6	1	1	3	3	3	2	2	2	2	2	2	2	2	2	1	1	1	1	3	3	1	4	1	5	3	4	3	5	5	5	5	5

Source: League matches
A = Away; H = Home; W = Win; D = Draw; L = Loss

==== Matches ====
Win Draw Loss

30 September 1979 1	PAOK	6–2	Kavala	Thessaloniki
	Kostikos 6', 8', 52'; Orfanos 19', 56'; Alexandridis 66'		Filippidis 77'; Triantafyllidis 79'	Stadium: Toumba Stadium; Attendance: 11,940; Referee: Karavasilis

7 October 1979 2	Aris	2–0	PAOK	Thessaloniki
	Semertzidis 35'; Ananiadis 68'			Stadium: Kleanthis Vikelidis Stadium; Attendance: 24,589; Referee: Charalabidis

14 October 1979 3	PAOK	4–0	AEK Athens	Thessaloniki
	Guerino 9', 37'; Orfanos 67'; Vasilakos 72'			Stadium: Toumba Stadium; Attendance: 24,082; Referee: Pantzalis

21 October 1979 4	PAOK	1–0	Ethnikos Piraeus	Thessaloniki
	Kermanidis 46'			Stadium: Toumba Stadium; Attendance: 6,326; Referee: Dedes

4 November 1979 5	Doxa Drama	1–1	PAOK	Drama
	Strantzalis 30'		Damanakis 29'	Stadium: Doxa Drama Stadium; Attendance: 10,506; Referee: Patarakis

11 November 1979 6	PAOK	4–1	Rodos	Thessaloniki
	Apostolidis 28'; Guerino 29' (pen.); Kermanidis 39'; Kostikos 67'		Rados 20'; Doxakis (red card) 29'	Stadium: Toumba Stadium; Attendance: 14,608; Referee: Petrakis

18 November 1979 7	Panathinaikos	0–0	PAOK	Athens
				Stadium: Leoforos Stadium; Attendance: 20,007; Referee: Loutridis

25 November 1979 8	AEL	0–2	PAOK	Larissa
			Koudas 23'; Orfanos 81'	Stadium: Alcazar Stadium; Attendance: 10,616; Referee: Sidiropoulos

2 December 1979 9	PAOK	3–0	OFI	Thessaloniki
	Kostikos 4', 31'; Damanakis 85'			Stadium: Toumba Stadium; Attendance: 10,375; Referee: Messalas

16 December 1979 11	PAOK	2–1	PAS Giannina	Thessaloniki
	Kostikos 3'; Vasilakos 16'		Papangelis 67'	Stadium: Toumba Stadium; Attendance: 7,809; Referee: Fakis

23 December 1979 12	Korinthos	3–1	PAOK	Corinth
	Tsikitzelas 35'; Pissas 47'; Pittas 57'		Orfanos 78'	Stadium: Corinth Municipal Stadium; Attendance: 8,211; Referee: Zacheilas

26 December 1979 13	PAOK	3–1	Panionios	Thessaloniki
	Guerino 7' (pen.), 48'; Kostikos 51'		Anastopoulos 22'	Stadium: Toumba Stadium; Attendance: 9,818; Referee: Tsolakis

30 December 1979 14	Panachaiki	1–1	PAOK	Patras
	Georgopoulos (red card) 29'; Spentzopoulos 73'		Orfanos 17'	Stadium: Kostas Davourlis Stadium; Attendance: 6,575; Referee: Kyfonidis

6 January 1980 15	PAOK	2–1	Iraklis	Thessaloniki
	Vasilakos 29'; Kermanidis 65'		Kalabakas 15'	Stadium: Toumba Stadium; Attendance: 22,153; Referee: Zlatanos

9 January 1980 10	Kastoria	0–0	PAOK	Kastoria
				Stadium: Kastoria Stadium; Referee: Koukoulakis
Note: Match was initially scheduled on 9 December 1979, but Matchday 10 was postponed due to a strike declared by the players.

13 January 1980 16	Apollon Athens	1–0	PAOK	Athens
	Zoumas 15'			Stadium: Rizoupoli Stadium; Attendance: 3,376; Referee: Vourakis

20 January 1980 17	PAOK	2–0	Olympiacos	Thessaloniki
	Kostikos 32'; Kermanidis 83'			Stadium: Toumba Stadium; Attendance: 36,016; Referee: Germanakos

27 January 1980 18	Kavala	0–1	PAOK	Kavala
			Koiveroglou 39' (o.g.)	Stadium: Kavala Stadium; Attendance: 5,455; Referee: Ballis

3 February 1980 19	PAOK	2–0	Aris	Thessaloniki
	Kostikos 13', 83'			Stadium: Toumba Stadium; Attendance: 42,795; Referee: Loutridis

10 February 1980 20	AEK Athens	3–1	PAOK	Athens
	Vlachos 10'; Bajević 27'; Ardizoglou 70'		Guerino 41'	Stadium: Nikos Goumas Stadium; Attendance: 26,949; Referee: Kyfonidis

17 February 1980 21	Ethnikos Piraeus	1–0	PAOK	Piraeus
	Labrinos 47'			Stadium: Karaiskakis Stadium; Attendance: 18,124; Referee: Mersinis

24 February 1980 22	PAOK	1–0	Doxa Drama	Thessaloniki
	Alavantas 36'			Stadium: Toumba Stadium; Attendance: 16,529; Referee: Tsolakis

2 March 1980 23	Rodos	0–0	PAOK	Rhodes
				Stadium: Diagoras Stadium; Attendance: 4,164; Referee: Lagogiannis

9 March 1980 24	PAOK	0–2	Panathinaikos	Thessaloniki
	Pellios (red card) 57'; Orfanos (penalty missed) 85'		Rocha 11'; Terzanidis 83'	Stadium: Toumba Stadium; Attendance: 29,992; Referee: Litsas
Note: This was PAOK first league home defeat after a 62-game (52 wins–10 draws) unbeaten run. After the final whistle, rioting PAOK fans infuriated by Litsas refereeing, blocked the exit of the dressing rooms and the police used for first time tear gas on a Greek football field. 23 police officers and 20 fans sustained injuries and PAOK had a 2-match stadium ban by the HFF.

16 March 1980 25	PAOK	4–0	AEL	Thessaloniki
	Kermanidis 29'; Guerino 58'; Sarafis 67', 81' (pen.)			Stadium: Toumba Stadium; Attendance: 7,388; Referee: Fakis

23 March 1980 26	OFI	2–1	PAOK	Heraklion
	Singas 13' (o.g.); Papadopoulos 71' (pen.)		Sarafis 74' (pen.)	Stadium: Theodoros Vardinogiannis Stadium; Attendance: 4,839; Referee: Germanakos

30 March 1980 27	PAOK	3–0	Kastoria	Katerini
	Kostikos 4', 53'; Koudas 69'		Chouzounidis (penalty missed) 34'	Stadium: Katerini Stadium; Attendance: 7,990; Referee: Patarakis

8 April 1980 28	PAS Giannina	3–0	PAOK	Ioannina
	Seitaridis 13' (pen.), 75' (pen.); Tsirimokos 83'			Stadium: Zosimades Stadium; Attendance: 9,956; Referee: Marinelis

13 April 1980 29	PAOK	3–1	Korinthos	Katerini
	Orfanos 2'; Sarafis 20' (penalty missed) 29'; Tsikitzelas 62' (o.g.)		Pittas 65' (pen.)	Stadium: Katerini Stadium; Referee: Charalabidis

20 April 1980 30	Panionios	2–1	PAOK	Thessaloniki
	Moraitelis 68' (pen.); Gravanis 85'		Guerino 63' (pen.)	Stadium: Nea Smyrni Stadium; Attendance: 10,247; Referee: Dedes

27 April 1980 31	PAOK	2–2	Panachaiki	Thessaloniki
	Kostikos 39' (pen.); Kermanidis 76'		Spentzopoulos 83'; Psarras 88'	Stadium: Kaftanzoglio Stadium; Attendance: 9,172; Referee: Vourakis
Note: Game held at Kaftanzoglio Stadium because Toumba Stadium was closed temporarily due to damage sustained in the June 1978 earthquake.

4 May 1980 32	Iraklis	1–1	PAOK	Thessaloniki
	Kalabakas 10'; Papaioannou (red card) 29'		Kostikos 28' (pen.)	Stadium: Kaftanzoglio Stadium; Attendance: 18,480; Referee: Iordanidis

11 May 1980 33	PAOK	1–0	Apollon Athens	Thessaloniki
	Kostikos 46'			Stadium: Kaftanzoglio Stadium; Attendance: 2,387; Referee: Vardakas
Note: Game held at Kaftanzoglio Stadium because Toumba Stadium was closed temporarily due to damage sustained in the June 1978 earthquake.

18 May 1980 34	Olympiacos	2–0	PAOK	Piraeus
	Galakos 14', 30'			Stadium: Karaiskakis Stadium; Attendance: 35,470; Referee: Printezis

== Greek Cup ==
=== First round ===
21 November 1979	PAOK	6–0	Anagennisi Giannitsa	Thessaloniki
	Kostikos 3', 85'; Koudas 16'; Iosifidis 29'; Alexandridis 44', 56'			Stadium: Toumba Stadium; Attendance: 2,521; Referee: Voulgaris

=== Second round ===
6 February 1980	Olympiacos	1–2	PAOK	Piraeus
	Galakos 14'		Orfanos 12'; Vasilakos 25'	Stadium: Karaiskakis Stadium; Attendance: 38,150; Referee: Tsolakis

=== Third round ===
20 February 1980	PAOK	1–0	AEK Athens	Thessaloniki
	Guerino 9'			Stadium: Toumba Stadium; Attendance: 28,151; Referee: Argyriou

=== Quarter-finals ===
5 March 1980 1st leg	Aris	1–0	PAOK	Thessaloniki
	Zindros 67'			Stadium: Kleanthis Vikelidis Stadium; Attendance: 24,763; Referee: Printezis

30 April 1980 2nd leg	PAOK	2–0 (a.e.t.) (2–1 agg.)	Aris	Thessaloniki
	Sarafis 60'; Vasilakos 108'			Stadium: Kaftanzoglio Stadium; Attendance: 34,641; Referee: Vourakis
Note: Game held at Kaftanzoglio Stadium because Toumba Stadium was closed temporarily due to damage sustained in the June 1978 earthquake.

=== Semi-finals ===
7 May 1980 1st leg	PAOK	0–1	Iraklis	Thessaloniki
			Orfanidis 2'	Stadium: Kaftanzoglio Stadium; Attendance: 33,612; Referee: Platopoulos
Note: Game held at Kaftanzoglio Stadium because Toumba Stadium was closed temporarily due to damage sustained in the June 1978 earthquake.

21 May 1980 2nd leg	Iraklis	1–1 (2–1 agg.)	PAOK	Thessaloniki
	Kalabakas 25'		Damanakis 26'	Stadium: Kaftanzoglio Stadium; Attendance: 32,136; Referee: Lagogiannis

== Statistics ==
=== Squad statistics ===
As of May 21, 1980

Appearances denote players in the starting lineup, with the numbers in parentheses denoting appearances as substitute.

No.	Name	Alpha Ethniki		Greek Cup		Total	
No.	Name	Apps	Goals	Apps	Goals	Apps	Goals
Goalkeepers
	(Socialist Federal Republic of Yugoslavia) Mladen Furtula	18	0	4	0	22	0
	(Greece) Apostolos Filis	17	0	3	0	20	0
Defenders
	(Greece) Kostas Iosifidis	33	0	7	1	40	1
	(Greece) Ioannis Gounaris	33	0	7	0	40	0
	(Greece) Theodoros Apostolidis	30	1	5	0	35	1
	(Greece) Nikos Alavantas	24	1	4	0	28	1
	(Greece) Filotas Pellios	14	0	4	0	18	0
	(Greece) Apostolos Tsourelas	1	0	1	0	2	0
Midfielders
	(Greece) Angelos Anastasiadis	32	0	6	0	38	0
	(Greece) Giorgos Koudas	26	2	4	1	30	3
	(Greece) Ioannis Damanakis	23	2	6	1	29	3
	(Greece) Vasilios Vasilakos	22	3	6	2	28	5
	(Greece) Kyriakos Alexandridis	17	1	3	2	20	3
	(Greece) Stavros Sarafis	16	4	3	1	19	5
	(Greece) Thomas Singas	4	0	3	0	7	0
Forwards
	(Greece) Panagiotis Kermanidis	29	6	7	0	36	6
	(Greece) Giorgos Kostikos	29	16	6	2	35	18
	(Brazil) Neto Guerino	31	8	4	1	35	9
	(Greece) Kostas Orfanos	28	7	4	1	32	8

Source: Match reports in competitive matches, RSSSF

=== Goalscorers ===
Rank	No.	Pos.	Player	Alpha Ethniki	Greek Cup	Total
1		FW	(Greece) Giorgos Kostikos	16	2	18
2		FW	(Brazil) Neto Guerino	8	1	9
3		FW	(Greece) Kostas Orfanos	7	1	8
4		FW	(Greece) Panagiotis Kermanidis	6	0	6
5		MF	(Greece) Stavros Sarafis	4	1	5
5		MF	(Greece) Vasilios Vasilakos	3	2	5
7		MF	(Greece) Giorgos Koudas	2	1	3
7		MF	(Greece) Ioannis Damanakis	2	1	3
7		MF	(Greece) Kyriakos Alexandridis	1	2	3
10		DF	(Greece) Theodoros Apostolidis	1	0	1
10		DF	(Greece) Nikos Alavantas	1	0	1
10		DF	(Greece) Kostas Iosifidis	0	1	1
Own goals				2	0	2
TOTALS				53	12	65

Source: Match reports in competitive matches, RSSSF
