= 1977–78 PAOK FC season =

PAOK
1977–78 season
- President: Giorgos Pantelakis
- Manager: Billy Bingham; Dimitris Kalogiannis; Lakis Petropoulos
- Stadium: Toumba Stadium
- Alpha Ethniki: Runners-up
- Greek Cup: Runners-up
- UEFA Cup Winners' Cup: 2nd round
- Top goalscorer: League: Kostas Orfanos (15); All: Kostas Orfanos (21)
- Highest home attendance: 30,477 vs Olympiacos

The 1977–78 season was PAOK Football Club's 52nd in existence and the club's 19th consecutive season in the top flight of Greek football. The team entered the Greek Football Cup in first round and also participated in the UEFA Cup Winners' Cup.

== Players ==
=== Squad ===
Note: Flags indicate national team as defined under FIFA eligibility rules; some limited exceptions apply. Players may hold more than one non-FIFA nationality.

No.	Pos.	Nation	Player
—	GK	YUG	Mladen Furtula
—	GK	GRE	Dimitris Festeris
—	DF	GRE	Kostas Iosifidis
—	DF	GRE	Ioannis Gounaris
—	DF	GRE	Filotas Pellios
—	DF	GRE	Aristotelis Fountoukidis
—	DF	GRE	Nikos Alavantas
—	DF	GRE	Themis Kapousouzis
—	MF	GRE	Giorgos Koudas (captain)
—	MF	GRE	Koulis Apostolidis
—	MF	GRE	Angelos Anastasiadis

No.	Pos.	Nation	Player
—	MF	GRE	Stavros Sarafis
—	MF	GRE	Ioannis Damanakis
—	MF	GRE	Giannis Pathiakakis
—	MF	GRE	Dimitris Voulgaris
—	FW	GRE	Kostas Orfanos
—	FW	GRE	Panagiotis Kermanidis
—	FW	BRA	Neto Guerino
—	FW	GRE	Georgios Kostikos
—	FW	GRE	Alexandros Boditsopoulos

== Transfers ==
Players transferred in

Transfer Window	Pos.	Name	Club	Fee
Summer	GK	(Greece) Dimitris Festeris	(Greece) Pandramaikos	?
Summer	MF	(Greece) Giannis Pathiakakis	(Greece) Apollon Athens	?
Summer	FW	(Greece) Georgios Kostikos	(Greece) Pierikos	6.5 million Dr.

Players transferred out

Transfer Window	Pos.	Name	Club	Fee
Summer	GK	(Greece) Diamantis Milinis	(Greece) Panserraikos	Free
Summer	MF	(Greece) Christos Terzanidis	(Greece) Panathinaikos	3 million Dr.
Summer	FW	(Greece) Dimitris Paridis		Retired

== Pre-season ==
Win Draw Loss

14 August 1977 Friendly	TSV Westerland	2–5	PAOK	West Germany
	(pen.) (pen.)		Pathiakakis; Damanakis; Guerino; Kermanidis

24 August 1977 Friendly	PAOK	3–2	Aris	Thessaloniki
	Guerino 45' (pen.); Damanakis 54'; Kostikos 70'		Foiros 21'; Pallas 24'	Stadium: Toumba Stadium; Referee: Chiotakis

28 August 1977 Friendly	PAOK	0–0	AEK Athens	Thessaloniki
				Stadium: Toumba Stadium; Referee: Zlatanos

1 September 1977 Friendly	Olympiacos	3–1	PAOK	Piraeus
	Karavitis 29'; Kritikopoulos 42'; Galakos 83'		Orfanos 60' (pen.)	Stadium: Karaiskakis Stadium; Referee: Marinos

4 September 1977 Friendly	PAOK	2–0	Panionios	Thessaloniki
	Pathiakakis 26'; Koudas 67'			Stadium: Toumba Stadium

7 September 1977 Friendly	PAOK	4–0	Apollon Limassol	Thessaloniki
	Fountoukidis 12'; Kermanidis 35', 51'; Guerino 64' (pen.)			Stadium: Toumba Stadium

== Competitions ==
=== Overview ===
Competition	Record							
Competition	Pld	W	D	L	GF	GA	GD	Win %
Alpha Ethniki	34	16	14	4	48	24	+24	47.06
Greek Cup	6	5	0	1	17	4	+13	83.33
Cup Winners' Cup	4	3	0	1	6	4	+2	75.00
Total	44	24	14	6	71	32	+39	54.55

Source: Competitions

=== Managerial statistics ===
Head coach	From	To	Record							
Head coach	From	To	G	W	D	L	GF	GA	GD	Win %
(England) Billy Bingham	Start of season	23.10.1977	10	5	2	3	12	9	+3	50.00
(Greece) Dimitris Kalogiannis (Interim)	30.10.1977	26.12.1977	10	5	5	0	16	5	+11	50.00
(Greece) Lakis Petropoulos	08.01.1978	End of season	24	14	7	3	43	18	+25	58.33

== Alpha Ethniki ==
=== Standings ===
Pos	Team	Pld	W	D	L	GF	GA	GD	Pts	Qualification or relegation
1	AEK Athens (C)	34	21	11	2	74	27	+47	53	Qualification for European Cup first round
2	PAOK	34	16	14	4	48	24	+24	46	Qualification for Cup Winners' Cup first round (Note: Since AEK Athens also won the Greek Cup and were qualified for the 1978–79 European Cup, the Cup runners-up, PAOK earned a spot in the Cup Winners' Cup first round.)
3	Panathinaikos	34	19	7	8	63	25	+38	45	Qualification for UEFA Cup first round
4	Olympiacos	34	17	10	7	46	20	+26	44	Qualification for UEFA Cup first round
5	PAS Giannina	34	14	10	10	45	39	+6	38	

Source: RSSSF
Rules for classification: 1st points; 2nd decision match; 3rd head-to-head goal difference.
(C) Champions

==== Results summary ====
Overall								Home						Away					
Pld	W	D	L	GF	GA	GD	Pts	W	D	L	GF	GA	GD	W	D	L	GF	GA	GD
34	16	14	4	48	24	+24	62	13	4	0	35	9	+26	3	10	4	13	15	−2

Last updated: 28 May 1978.
Source: Competitive matches

==== Results by round ====
Round	1	2	3	4	5	6	7	8	9	10	11	12	13	14	15	16	17	18	19	20	21	22	23	24	25	26	27	28	29	30	31	32	33	34
Ground	A	A	H	A	H	A	H	A	H	H	A	H	A	H	A	H	A	H	H	A	H	A	H	A	H	A	A	H	A	H	A	H	A	H
Result	D	D	W	L	W	L	D	D	W	W	D	W	D	D	W	D	L	W	W	D	W	D	D	W	W	D	D	W	W	W	D	W	L	W
Position	9	7	4	7	4	8	8	8	8	6	6	4	5	5	5	5	4	4	4	4	3	4	4	3	3	4	4	4	3	2	2	2	2	2

Source: League matches
A = Away; H = Home; W = Win; D = Draw; L = Loss

==== Matches ====
Win Draw Loss

11 September 1977 1	Panathinaikos	0–0	PAOK	Athens
				Stadium: Leoforos Stadium; Attendance: 22,752

18 September 1977 2	Apollon Athens	1–1	PAOK	Athens
	Asimakopoulos 44' (pen.)		Pathiakakis 42'	Stadium: Rizoupoli Stadium; Attendance: 6,316; Referee: Lagogiannis

2 October 1977 3	PAOK	3–0	Pierikos	Thessaloniki
	Koudas 73'; Orfanos 81', 87'			Stadium: Toumba Stadium; Attendance: 10,428

9 October 1977 4	OFI	2–1	PAOK	Heraklion
	Papadopoulos 15'; Foustanakis 43'		Kermanidis 29'	Stadium: Theodoros Vardinogiannis Stadium; Attendance: 7,046

16 October 1977 5	PAOK	1–0	PAS Giannina	Thessaloniki
	Orfanos 8'			Stadium: Toumba Stadium; Attendance: 9,779

23 October 1977 6	Panachaiki	2–0	PAOK	Patras
	Ioakeimidis 44'; Spentzopoulos 71'			Stadium: Kostas Davourlis Stadium; Attendance: 6,297

30 October 1977 7	PAOK	1–1	Iraklis	Thessaloniki
	Kermanidis 20'		Gesios 67'	Stadium: Toumba Stadium; Referee: Printezis

6 November 1977 8	Kastoria	1–1	PAOK	Kastoria
	Argyros 69'		Orfanos 70'	Stadium: Kastoria Stadium; Attendance: 4,278

13 November 1977 9	PAOK	1–0	Ethnikos Piraeus	Thessaloniki
	Orfanos 56'			Stadium: Toumba Stadium; Attendance: 8,502; Referee: Charalabidis

23 November 1977 10	PAOK	3–1	Kavala	Thessaloniki
	Orfanos 12' (pen.), 31'; Sarafis 22'		Triantafyllidis 18'	Stadium: Toumba Stadium; Attendance: 2,970

27 November 1977 11	Aris	0–0	PAOK	Thessaloniki
				Stadium: Kleanthis Vikelidis Stadium; Attendance: 13,729; Referee: Saraliotis

4 December 1977 12	PAOK	2–0	Veria	Thessaloniki
	Orfanos 43', 83'			Stadium: Toumba Stadium; Attendance: 3,709; Referee: Lekkas

11 December 1977 13	Olympiacos	0–0	PAOK	Piraeus
				Stadium: Karaiskakis Stadium; Attendance: 15,714

18 December 1977 14	PAOK	0–0	Panionios	Thessaloniki
				Stadium: Toumba Stadium; Attendance: 2,928; Referee: Pachygiannakis

26 December 1977 15	Panserraikos	1–2	PAOK	Serres
	Chatzistavridis 82'		Malaxianakis 44'; Boditsopoulos 80'	Stadium: Serres Municipal Stadium
Note: Matchday 15 was played with reserve squad/amateur players due to a strike declared from semi professional players.

8 January 1978 16	PAOK	1–1	AEK Athens	Thessaloniki
	Damanakis 67'		Bajević 44'	Stadium: Toumba Stadium; Attendance: 17,552; Referee: Papavassiliou

15 January 1978 17	Egaleo	2–1	PAOK	Athens
	Forakis 13'; Chatziskoulidis 62'		Orfanos 50' (pen.)	Stadium: Stavros Mavrothalassitis Stadium; Attendance: 4,751; Referee: Vourakis

22 January 1978 18	PAOK	3–1	Panathinaikos	Thessaloniki
	Sarafis 29', 63'; Koudas 46'		Giannakoulas 60'	Stadium: Toumba Stadium; Attendance: 22,061

29 January 1978 19	PAOK	3–0	Apollon Athens	Thessaloniki
	Orfanos 33', 39'; Koudas 63'			Stadium: Toumba Stadium; Attendance: 8,169

5 February 1978 20	Pierikos	1–1	PAOK	Katerini
	Mischos 5'		Anastasiadis 58' (pen.)	Stadium: Katerini Stadium

12 February 1978 21	PAOK	5–0	OFI	Thessaloniki
	Sarafis 24'; Orfanos 37', 70' (pen.); Iosifidis 43'; Pathiakakis 56'			Stadium: Kaftanzoglio Stadium; Attendance: 11,152; Referee: Labropoulos

19 February 1978 22	PAS Giannina	1–1	PAOK	Ioannina
	Liakos 37'		Damanakis 32'	Stadium: Zosimades Stadium; Attendance: 6,718

26 February 1978 23	PAOK	1–1	Panachaiki	Thessaloniki
	Anastasiadis 27'		Spentzopoulos 90'	Stadium: Toumba Stadium; Attendance: 11,392; Referee: Paschalidis

5 March 1978 24	Iraklis	0–1	PAOK	Thessaloniki
			Sarafis 25'	Stadium: Kaftanzoglio Stadium; Attendance: 21,205; Referee: Chiotakis

12 March 1978 25	PAOK	2–1	Kastoria	Thessaloniki
	Damanakis 16'; Anastasiadis (penalty missed) 44'; Guerino 58'		Kopanos 38'	Stadium: Toumba Stadium; Attendance: 3,967; Referee: Triantafyllou

19 March 1978 26	Ethnikos Piraeus	1–1	PAOK	Piraeus
	Karaiskos 57' (pen.)		Koudas 67'	Stadium: Karaiskakis Stadium; Attendance: 10,794

26 March 1978 27	Kavala	0–0	PAOK	Kavala
				Stadium: Kavala Stadium; Attendance: 5,825; Referee: Triantafyllou

2 April 1978 28	PAOK	2–1	Aris	Thessaloniki
	Kermanidis 3'; Koudas 64'		Pallas 31' (pen.)	Stadium: Toumba Stadium; Attendance: 23,693; Referee: Fakis

9 April 1978 29	Veria	1–3	PAOK	Veria
	Chatzaras 20' (pen.); Papatzikos (penalty missed) 78'		Kermanidis 16'; Damanakis 47'; Orfanos 90'	Stadium: Veria Stadium; Attendance: 9,125; Referee: Printezis

16 April 1978 30	PAOK	1–0	Olympiacos	Thessaloniki
	Guerino 16'			Stadium: Toumba Stadium; Attendance: 30,477; Referee: Fakis

23 April 1978 31	Panionios	0–0	PAOK	Athens
				Stadium: Nea Smyrni Stadium; Attendance: 7,272

7 May 1978 32	PAOK	2–1	Panserraikos	Thessaloniki
	Kermanidis 17', 49'		Kaltsas 65'	Stadium: Toumba Stadium; Attendance: 4,590

14 May 1978 33	AEK Athens	2–0	PAOK	Athens
	Bajević 17'; Mavros 89'			Stadium: Nikos Goumas Stadium; Attendance: 21,741

28 May 1978 34	PAOK	4–1	Egaleo	Thessaloniki
	Guerino 22', 85'; Anastasiadis 70' (pen.); Kermanidis 87'		Konstantinou 53'	Stadium: Toumba Stadium; Referee: Saraliotis

== Greek Cup ==
=== First round ===
21 December 1977	PAOK	6–1	Levadiakos	Thessaloniki
	Orfanos 20', 78'; Kostikos 37', 90'; Kermanidis 45'; Iosifidis 54'		Margaritis 87'	Stadium: Toumba Stadium

=== Second round ===
1 February 1978	PAOK	4–1	Olympiacos Volos	Thessaloniki
	Sarafis 2', 64'; Orfanos 23' (pen.), 43' (pen.)		Voulgaris 40' (pen.)	Stadium: Toumba Stadium; Referee: Panagopoulos

=== Third round ===
8 March 1978	Iraklis	0–1	PAOK	Thessaloniki
	Gesios (red card) 9'		Kermanidis 79'	Stadium: Kaftanzoglio Stadium; Attendance: 26,903; Referee: Pantzalis

=== Quarter–finals ===
19 April 1978	PAOK	5–0	Veria	Thessaloniki
	Guerino 2', 4'; Koudas 52'; Sarafis 63'; Apostolidis 75'			Stadium: Toumba Stadium; Attendance: 6,599

=== Semi–finals ===
17 May 1978	Aris	0–1 (a.e.t.)	PAOK	Thessaloniki
			Orfanos 112'	Stadium: Kleanthis Vikelidis Stadium; Attendance: 22,900; Referee: Fakis

=== Final ===
4 June 1978	AEK Athens	2–0	PAOK	Piraeus
21:00 EEST	Bajević 50'; Mavros 80'			Stadium: Karaiskakis Stadium; Attendance: 23,483; Referee: Zlatanos

== UEFA Cup Winners' Cup ==
=== First round ===
14 September 1977 1st leg	PAOK (Greece)	2–0	(Poland) Zagłębie Sosnowiec	Thessaloniki, Greece
	Pellios 25'; Orfanos (penalty missed) 57'; Anastasiadis 80' (pen.)	Report		Stadium: Toumba Stadium; Attendance: 23,328; Referee: Alberto Michelotti (Italy)

28 September 1977 2nd leg	Zagłębie Sosnowiec (Poland)	0–2 (0–4 agg.)	(Greece) PAOK	Sosnowiec, Poland
		Report	Kermanidis 47'; Damanakis 69'	Stadium: Stadion Ludowy; Referee: Brian McGinlay (Scotland)

=== Second round ===
19 October 1977 1st leg	Vejle (Denmark)	3–0	(Greece) PAOK	Vejle, Denmark
	Eg 12'; Jacquet 79'; Østergaard 88'	Report		Stadium: Vejle Stadium; Referee: Ferdinand Biwersi (Germany)

2 November 1977 2nd leg	PAOK (Greece)	2–1 (2–4 agg.)	(Denmark) Vejle	Thessaloniki, Greece
	Orfanos 23'; Kermanidis 89'	Report	Jacquet 74'	Stadium: Toumba Stadium; Referee: Nicolae Rainea (Romania)

== Statistics ==
=== Squad statistics ===
As of June 4, 1978

Appearances denote players in the starting lineup, with the numbers in parentheses denoting appearances as substitute.

No.	Name	Alpha Ethniki		Greek Cup		UEFA CWC		Total	
No.	Name	Apps	Goals	Apps	Goals	Apps	Goals	Apps	Goals
Goalkeepers
	(Socialist Federal Republic of Yugoslavia) Mladen Furtula	33	0	6	0	4	0	43	0
	(Greece) Dimitris Festeris	1	0	0	0	0	0	1	0
Defenders
	(Greece) Kostas Iosifidis	33	1	6	1	4	0	43	2
	(Greece) Ioannis Gounaris	31	0	5	0	4	0	40	0
	(Greece) Filotas Pellios	27	0	4	0	2	1	33	1
	(Greece) Aristotelis Fountoukidis	17	0	1	0	2	0	20	0
	(Greece) Nikos Alavantas	6	0	3	0	0	0	9	0
	(Greece) Themis Kapousouzis	4	0	0	0	2	0	6	0
Midfielders
	(Greece) Giorgos Koudas	31	5	5	1	4	0	40	6
	(Greece) Koulis Apostolidis	31	0	5	1	3	0	39	1
	(Greece) Ioannis Damanakis	27	4	6	0	4	1	37	5
	(Greece) Stavros Sarafis	21	5	6	3	0	0	27	8
	(Greece) Angelos Anastasiadis	19	3	4	0	3	1	26	4
	(Greece) Giannis Pathiakakis	18	2	3	0	4	0	25	2
	(Greece) Dimitris Voulgaris	1	0	0	0	0	0	1	0
Forwards
	(Greece) Kostas Orfanos	33	15	6	5	4	1	43	21
	(Greece) Panagiotis Kermanidis	31	7	5	2	4	2	40	11
	(Greece) Georgios Kostikos	25	0	3	2	4	0	32	2
	(Brazil) Neto Guerino	24	4	5	2	1	0	30	6
	(Greece) Alexandros Boditsopoulos	2	1	0	0	0	0	2	1

Source: Match reports in competitive matches, RSSSF

=== Goalscorers ===
Rank	No.	Pos.	Player	Alpha Ethniki	Greek Cup	UEFA CWC	Total
1		FW	(Greece) Kostas Orfanos	15	5	1	21
2		FW	(Greece) Panagiotis Kermanidis	7	2	2	11
3		MF	(Greece) Stavros Sarafis	5	3	0	8
4		MF	(Greece) Giorgos Koudas	5	1	0	6
4		FW	(Brazil) Neto Guerino	4	2	0	6
6		MF	(Greece) Ioannis Damanakis	4	0	1	5
7		MF	(Greece) Angelos Anastasiadis	3	0	1	4
8		MF	(Greece) Giannis Pathiakakis	2	0	0	2
8		DF	(Greece) Kostas Iosifidis	1	1	0	2
8		FW	(Greece) Georgios Kostikos	0	2	0	2
11		DF	(Greece) Filotas Pellios	0	0	1	1
11		MF	(Greece) Koulis Apostolidis	0	1	0	1
11		FW	(Greece) Alexandros Boditsopoulos	1	0	0	1
11		FW	(Greece) Michalis Malaxianakis	1	0	0	1
TOTALS				48	17	6	71

Source: Match reports in competitive matches, RSSSF
