= 1978–79 PAOK FC season =

PAOK
1978–79 season
- President: Giorgos Pantelakis
- Manager: Egon Piechaczek
- Stadium: Toumba Stadium
- Alpha Ethniki: 4th
- Greek Cup: Round of 16
- UEFA Cup Winners' Cup: 1st round
- Top goalscorer: League: Guerino, Orfanos (15); All: Neto Guerino (16)
- Highest home attendance: 41,909 vs AEK Athens

The 1978–79 season was PAOK Football Club's 53rd in existence and the club's 20th consecutive season in the top flight of Greek football. The team entered the Greek Football Cup in first round, and also participated in the UEFA Cup Winners' Cup.

== Players ==
=== Squad ===
Note: Flags indicate national team as defined under FIFA eligibility rules; some limited exceptions apply. Players may hold more than one non-FIFA nationality.

No.	Pos.	Nation	Player
—	GK	YUG	Mladen Furtula
—	GK	GRE	Apostolos Filis
—	DF	GRE	Kostas Iosifidis
—	DF	GRE	Ioannis Gounaris
—	DF	GRE	Filotas Pellios
—	DF	GRE	Theodoros Apostolidis
—	DF	GRE	Nikos Alavantas
—	DF	GRE	Ilias Katsanikas
—	MF	GRE	Giorgos Koudas (captain)
—	MF	GRE	Koulis Apostolidis

No.	Pos.	Nation	Player
—	MF	GRE	Angelos Anastasiadis
—	MF	GRE	Stavros Sarafis
—	MF	GRE	Ioannis Damanakis
—	MF	GRE	Thomas Singas
—	FW	GRE	Kostas Orfanos
—	FW	GRE	Panagiotis Kermanidis
—	FW	BRA	Neto Guerino
—	FW	GRE	Giorgos Kostikos
—	FW	GRE	Nikos Panagiotidis

== Transfers ==
Players transferred in

Transfer Window	Pos.	Name	Club	Fee
Summer	GK	(Greece) Apostolos Filis	(Greece) Panionios	Exchange
Summer	DF	(Greece) Ilias Katsanikas	(Greece) Polykastro	?
Summer	DF	(Greece) Theodoros Apostolidis	(Greece) Kastoria	?
Summer	MF	(Greece) Thomas Singas	(Greece) Naoussa	?

Players transferred out

Transfer Window	Pos.	Name	Club	Fee
Summer	GK	(Greece) Dimitris Festeris	(Greece) Doxa Drama	Free
Summer	MF	(Greece) Giannis Pathiakakis	(Greece) Panionios	Exchange

== Pre-season ==
Win Draw Loss

9 August 1978 Friendly	Heuriger	3–6	PAOK	Lastrup, West Germany
			Guerino; Alavantas; Iosifidis; Damanakis; Kermanidis

14 August 1978 Friendly	Kouchalen Sport	2–2	PAOK	Lastrup, West Germany
			Th.Apostolidis; Guerino (pen.)

15 August 1978 Friendly	Lingen	1–5	PAOK	Lastrup, West Germany
	Dilsen 76'		Kermanidis 1'; Orfanos 10', 35'; Alavantas 65'; Guerino 75'

21 August 1978 Friendly	PAOK	0–0	Olympiacos	Thessaloniki
				Stadium: Kaftanzoglio Stadium; Referee: Rammos

24 August 1978 Friendly	PAOK	0–1	Aris	Thessaloniki
			Zelidis 23'	Stadium: Kaftanzoglio Stadium

27 August 1978 Friendly	Olympiacos	0–0	PAOK	Piraeus
				Stadium: Karaiskakis Stadium; Attendance: 24,076

30 August 1978 Friendly	PAOK	2–0	Panionios	Thessaloniki
	Damanakis 37'; Guerino 57' (pen.)			Stadium: Kaftanzoglio Stadium; Referee: Kaltsidis

== Competitions ==
=== Overview ===
Competition	Record							
Competition	Pld	W	D	L	GF	GA	GD	Win %
Alpha Ethniki	34	18	9	7	73	23	+50	52.94
Greek Cup	2	1	0	1	4	3	+1	50.00
Cup Winners' Cup	2	1	0	1	2	4	−2	50.00
Total	38	20	9	9	79	30	+49	52.63

Source: Competitions

== Alpha Ethniki ==
=== Standings ===
Pos	Team	Pld	W	D	L	GF	GA	GD	Pts	Qualification or relegation
2	Olympiacos (Note: AEK Athens pronounced champions, because Olympiacos did not show up for the play-off match.)	34	26	4	4	63	27	+36	56	Qualification for UEFA Cup first round
3	Aris	34	22	6	6	63	26	+37	50	Qualification for UEFA Cup first round
4	PAOK	34	18	9	7	73	23	+50	45	
5	Panathinaikos	34	14	10	10	46	37	+9	38	
6	Iraklis	34	12	10	12	51	46	+5	34	

Source: RSSSF
Rules for classification: 1st points; 2nd decision match; 3rd head-to-head goal difference.

==== Results summary ====
Overall								Home						Away					
Pld	W	D	L	GF	GA	GD	Pts	W	D	L	GF	GA	GD	W	D	L	GF	GA	GD
34	18	9	7	73	23	+50	63	16	1	0	60	7	+53	2	8	7	13	16	−3

Last updated: 3 June 1979.
Source: Competitive matches

==== Results by round ====
Round	1	2	3	4	5	6	7	8	9	10	11	12	13	14	15	16	17	18	19	20	21	22	23	24	25	26	27	28	29	30	31	32	33	34
Ground	H	A	H	H	A	H	A	H	A	H	A	A	H	A	H	A	H	A	H	A	A	H	A	H	A	H	A	H	H	A	H	Α	H	Α
Result	W	L	W	W	L	D	L	W	D	W	D	D	W	L	W	D	W	W	W	L	D	W	D	W	L	W	D	W	W	L	W	W	W	D
Position	1	6	5	5	7	7	9	7	7	6	6	6	5	6	6	6	5	4	4	5	5	5	5	5	5	5	5	4	4	4	4	4	4	4

Source: League matches
A = Away; H = Home; W = Win; D = Draw; L = Loss

==== Matches ====
Win Draw Loss

3 September 1978 1	PAOK	4–1	Kavala	Thessaloniki
	Koudas 2'; Kermanidis 61', 77'; Kostikos 80'		Espinosa 63'	Stadium: Kleanthis Vikelidis Stadium; Attendance: 8,336
Note: PAOK opening three home league games were held at the Kleanthis Vikelidis Stadium because Toumba Stadium was closed temporarily due to damage sustained in the June 1978 earthquake.

10 September 1978 2	AEK Athens	3–2	PAOK	Athens
	Mavros 1'; Domazos 65', 85'		Intzoglou 14' (o.g.); Koudas 87'	Stadium: Nikos Goumas Stadium; Attendance: 27,854

24 September 1978 3	PAOK	4–0	Egaleo	Thessaloniki
	Sarafis 4'; Guerino 36', 47', 78'			Stadium: Kleanthis Vikelidis Stadium; Attendance: 6,392; Referee: Paschalidis

1 October 1978 4	PAOK	5–0	PAS Giannina	Thessaloniki
	Guerino 50', 66'; Sarafis 55'; Kermanidis 68', 76'			Stadium: Kleanthis Vikelidis Stadium; Attendance: 8,675

14 October 1978 5	Olympiacos	1–0	PAOK	Piraeus
	Losada 51'			Stadium: Karaiskakis Stadium; Attendance: 27,704; Referee: Labropoulos

21 October 1978 6	PAOK	1–1	Iraklis	Thessaloniki
	Koudas 8'; Singas (penalty missed) 87'		Chatzieleftheriou 47'	Stadium: Toumba Stadium; Attendance: 14,608; Referee: Armodoros

5 November 1978 7	Panionios	2–1	PAOK	Athens
	Anastopoulos 23'; Núñez 50' (pen.)		Sarafis 44'	Stadium: Nea Smyrni Stadium; Attendance: 4,710; Referee: Grippas

12 November 1978 8	PAOK	1–0	Aris	Thessaloniki
	Guerino 72'			Stadium: Toumba Stadium; Attendance: 36,567; Referee: Sarakinos

19 November 1978 9	Ethnikos Piraeus	2–2	PAOK	Piraeus
	Karaiskos 56'; Vasilopoulos 65'		Damanakis 55'; Koudas 58'; Guerino (red card) 79'	Stadium: Karaiskakis Stadium; Referee: Kollyropoulos
Note: Match was replayed on 7 March. PAOK appealed against the integrity of the game because referee Kollyropoulos gave a signal for a quick kick off and Ethnikos equalised with Karaiskos while PAOK players were celebrating the opening goal at their bench.

10 December 1978 10	PAOK	3–0	Panachaiki	Thessaloniki
	Sarafis 48'; Kostikos 70' Orfanos 84'			Stadium: Toumba Stadium

17 December 1978 11	Apollon Athens	0–0	PAOK	Athens
				Stadium: Rizoupoli Stadium; Attendance: 6,800

24 December 1978 12	Panathinaikos	2–2	PAOK	Athens
	Gómez 29'; Kizas (penalty missed) 51'; Eleftherakis 62'		Kermanidis 32'; Kostikos 60'	Stadium: Leoforos Stadium; Attendance: 11,407; Referee: Sarakinos

31 December 1978 13	PAOK	4–2	Kastoria	Thessaloniki
	Anastasiadis 49'; Kermanidis 52'; Kostikos 57'; Sarafis 75' (pen.)		Touboglou 73' (pen.); Paunovski 81'	Stadium: Toumba Stadium; Attendance: 9,825; Referee: Panagopoulos

7 January 1979 14	Rodos	1–0	PAOK	Rhodes
	Drakos 45'			Stadium: Diagoras Stadium; Attendance: 4,522; Referee: Kollyropoulos

14 January 1979 15	PAOK	5–0	Panserraikos	Thessaloniki
	Kostikos 1'; Guerino 30'; Sarafis 37' (pen.), 52'; Anastasiadis 85'			Stadium: Toumba Stadium; Attendance: 5,340

21 January 1979 16	OFI	1–1	PAOK	Heraklion
	Rellis (red card) 80'; Vasileiou 83' (pen.)		Tzirakis 65' (o.g.)	Stadium: Theodoros Vardinogiannis Stadium; Attendance: 5,151; Referee: Printezis

28 January 1979 17	PAOK	4–0	AEL	Thessaloniki
	Orfanos 5', 43', 70'; Sarafis 39'			Stadium: Toumba Stadium; Attendance: 10,816; Referee: Panagopoulos

4 February 1979 18	Kavala	0–3	PAOK	Kavala
			Guerino 27'; Kostikos 32'; Orfanos 72'	Stadium: Kavala Stadium; Referee: Patarakis

11 February 1979 19	PAOK	2–1	AEK Athens	Thessaloniki
	Guerino 49' (pen.); Koudas (red card) 56'; Kostikos 84'		Ravousis (red card) 40'; Bajević 88'	Stadium: Toumba Stadium; Attendance: 41,909; Referee: Dedes

18 February 1979 20	Egaleo	1–0	PAOK	Athens
	Pigaditis 19' (pen.)			Stadium: Stavros Mavrothalassitis Stadium; Attendance: 6,448; Referee: Armodoros

25 February 1979 21	PAS Giannina	1–1	PAOK	Ioannina
	Korobelis 39'		Kostikos 4'	Stadium: Zosimades Stadium; Attendance: 5,725; Referee: Panagopoulos

4 March 1979 22	PAOK	2–0	Olympiacos	Thessaloniki
	Orfanos 45', 80'			Stadium: Toumba Stadium; Attendance: 25,362; Referee: Lekkas

7 March 1979 9	Ethnikos Piraeus	1–1	PAOK	Piraeus
	Karaiskos 54' (pen.)		Guerino 15'	Stadium: Karaiskakis Stadium; Attendance: 10,205; Referee: Tsolakis

11 March 1979 23	Iraklis	0–0	PAOK	Thessaloniki
				Stadium: Kaftanzoglio Stadium; Attendance: 13,886

18 March 1979 24	PAOK	5–0	Panionios	Thessaloniki
	Orfanos 55', 84'; Guerino 65'; Kermanidis 67'; Damanakis 79'			Stadium: Toumba Stadium; Referee: Vardakas

25 March 1979 25	Aris	1–0	PAOK	Thessaloniki
	Pallas 16' (pen.); Ballis (red card) 17'			Stadium: Kleanthis Vikelidis Stadium; Attendance: 27,000; Referee: Platopoulos

1 April 1979 26	PAOK	5–0	Ethnikos Piraeus	Thessaloniki
	Damanakis 35'; Sarafis 49' (pen.); Orfanos 58'; Koudas 72'; Kostikos 76'			Stadium: Toumba Stadium; Attendance: 5,882; Referee: Labropoulos

8 April 1979 27	Panachaiki	0–0	PAOK	Patras
				Stadium: Kostas Davourlis Stadium; Attendance: 6,721; Referee: Kritikos

15 April 1979 28	PAOK	3–0	Apollon Athens	Thessaloniki
	Th.Apostolidis 34'; Orfanos 42'; Sarafis 58'			Stadium: Toumba Stadium; Attendance: 11,040; Referee: Dedes

25 April 1979 29	PAOK	3–0	Panathinaikos	Thessaloniki
	Kermanidis 43', 52'; Orfanos 72'			Stadium: Toumba Stadium; Attendance: 27,656; Referee: Vourakis

6 May 1979 30	Kastoria	1–0	PAOK	Kastoria
	Stavridis 79'			Stadium: Kastoria Stadium; Attendance: 3,239; Referee: Marinelis

13 May 1979 31	PAOK	6–1	Rodos	Thessaloniki
	Kostikos 17'; Th.Apostolidis 47'; Orfanos 51', 62'; Sarafis 56'; Kermanidis 86'		Georgalis 83'	Stadium: Toumba Stadium; Attendance: 10,708

20 May 1979 32	Panserraikos	0–1	PAOK	Serres
			Guerino 53'	Stadium: Serres Municipal Stadium; Attendance: 1,844

27 May 1979 33	PAOK	3–1	OFI	Thessaloniki
	Guerino 2', 41' (pen.); Orfanos 72'		Papadopoulos 85'	Stadium: Toumba Stadium; Attendance: 7,684; Referee: Marinelis

3 June 1979 34	AEL	1–1	PAOK	Larissa
	Kritikos 85' (pen.)		Guerino 40' (pen.)	Stadium: Alcazar Stadium; Attendance: 1,844; Referee: Panagopoulos

== Greek Cup ==
=== First round ===
8 November 1978	PAOK	2–1	Panelefsiniakos	Thessaloniki
	Sarafis 10', 71'		Tsolakidis 70'	Stadium: Toumba Stadium; Attendance: 1,106

=== Second round ===
Bye

=== Third round ===
21 February 1979	Olympiacos	2–2 (a.e.t.) (6–5 p)	PAOK	Piraeus
	Kritikopoulos 17'; Rohrbach 61' (pen.)		Guerino 7'; Kermanidis 53'	Stadium: Karaiskakis Stadium; Attendance: 29,453; Referee: Panagopoulos
	Penalties
	Galakos (penalty scored); Rohrbach (penalty scored); Lemonis (penalty scored); Persias (penalty missed); Kyrastas (penalty missed); Katsavakis (penalty scored); Kaltsas (penalty scored); Kelesidis (penalty scored)		(penalty missed) Guerino; (penalty scored) Sarafis; (penalty missed) Orfanos; (penalty scored) Pellios; (penalty scored) Kermanidis; (penalty scored) Apostolidis; (penalty scored) Kostikos; (penalty missed) Furtula

== UEFA Cup Winners' Cup ==
=== First round ===
13 September 1978 1st leg	PAOK (Greece)	2–0	(Switzerland) Servette	Thessaloniki, Greece
	Kermanidis 77'; Sarafis 86'	Report		Stadium: Toumba Stadium; Referee: Constantin Barbulescu (Romania)

27 September 1978 2nd leg	Servette (Switzerland)	4–0 (4–2 agg.)	(Greece) PAOK	Geneva, Switzerland
	Pfister 15'; Hamberg 64'; Elia 85', 88'	Report		Stadium: Charmilles Stadium; Referee: László Pádár (Hungary)

== Statistics ==
=== Squad statistics ===
As of June 3, 1979

Appearances denote players in the starting lineup, with the numbers in parentheses denoting appearances as substitute.

No.	Name	Alpha Ethniki		Greek Cup		UEFA CWC		Total	
No.	Name	Apps	Goals	Apps	Goals	Apps	Goals	Apps	Goals
Goalkeepers
	(Socialist Federal Republic of Yugoslavia) Mladen Furtula	21	0	1	0	1	0	23	0
	(Greece) Apostolos Filis	13	0	1	0	1	0	15	0
Defenders
	(Greece) Ioannis Gounaris	33	0	2	0	2	0	37	0
	(Greece) Kostas Iosifidis	31	0	2	0	2	0	35	0
	(Greece) Theodoros Apostolidis	29	2	2	0	1	0	32	2
	(Greece) Filotas Pellios	29	0	2	0	0	0	31	0
	(Greece) Nikos Alavantas	13	0	0	0	2	0	15	0
	(Greece) Ilias Katsanikas	2	0	0	0	0	0	2	0
Midfielders
	(Greece) Ioannis Damanakis	33	1	2	0	2	0	37	1
	(Greece) Stavros Sarafis	30	11	2	2	2	1	34	14
	(Greece) Giorgos Koudas	26	4	0	0	2	0	28	4
	(Greece) Angelos Anastasiadis	22	2	1	0	1	0	24	2
	(Greece) Koulis Apostolidis	19	0	1	0	2	0	22	0
	(Greece) Thomas Singas	10	0	1	0	0	0	11	0
Forwards
	(Greece) Panagiotis Kermanidis	33	10	2	1	2	1	37	12
	(Greece) Kostas Orfanos	32	15	2	0	1	0	35	15
	(Greece) Giorgos Kostikos	30	10	2	0	2	0	34	10
	(Brazil) Neto Guerino	29	15	2	1	2	0	33	16
	(Greece) Nikos Panagiotidis	0	0	1	0	0	0	1	0

Source: Match reports in competitive matches, RSSSF

=== Goalscorers ===
Rank	No.	Pos.	Player	Alpha Ethniki	Greek Cup	UEFA CWC	Total
1		FW	(Brazil) Neto Guerino	15	1	0	16
2		FW	(Greece) Kostas Orfanos	15	0	0	15
3		MF	(Greece) Stavros Sarafis	11	2	1	14
4		FW	(Greece) Panagiotis Kermanidis	10	1	1	12
5		FW	(Greece) Giorgos Kostikos	10	0	0	10
6		MF	(Greece) Giorgos Koudas	4	0	0	4
7		MF	(Greece) Ioannis Damanakis	2	0	0	2
7		MF	(Greece) Angelos Anastasiadis	2	0	0	2
7		DF	(Greece) Theodoros Apostolidis	2	0	0	2
Own goals				2	0	0	2
TOTALS				73	4	2	79

Source: Match reports in competitive matches, RSSSF
