= List of PAOK FC records and statistics =

PAOK Football Club (Greek: ΠΑΕ ΠΑΟΚ, Πανθεσσαλονίκειος Αθλητικός Όμιλος Κωνσταντινοπολιτών, Panthessaloníkios Athlitikós Ómilos Konstantinopolitón, "Pan-Thessalonian Athletic Club of Constantinopolitans"), commonly known as PAOK Thessaloniki or PAOK, is a professional football club based in Thessaloniki, Macedonia, Greece. Established on 20 April 1926 by Greek refugees who fled to Thessaloniki from Constantinople in the wake of the Greco-Turkish War (1919–1922), they play their home games at Toumba Stadium, with a capacity of 29,000 seats.

This list encompasses the major honours won by PAOK, records set by the club, their managers and their players. The player records section includes details of the club's leading goalscorers and those who have made the most appearances in first-team competitions. The list also includes the attendance records at Toumba Stadium, the team's domestic records and an all-time summary table of results in European competitions.

== Honours ==
PAOK FC honours
Type	Competition	Titles	Seasons
Domestic	Super League Greece	4	1975–76, 1984–85, 2018–19, 2023–24
Domestic	Greek Cup	8	1971–72, 1973–74, 2000–01, 2002–03, 2016–17, 2017–18, 2018–19, 2020–21
Regional	Macedonia FCA Championship	7	1936–37, 1947–48, 1949–50, 1953–54, 1954–55, 1955–56, 1956–57
Regional	Macedonia–Thrace FCA Championship	1	1939–40

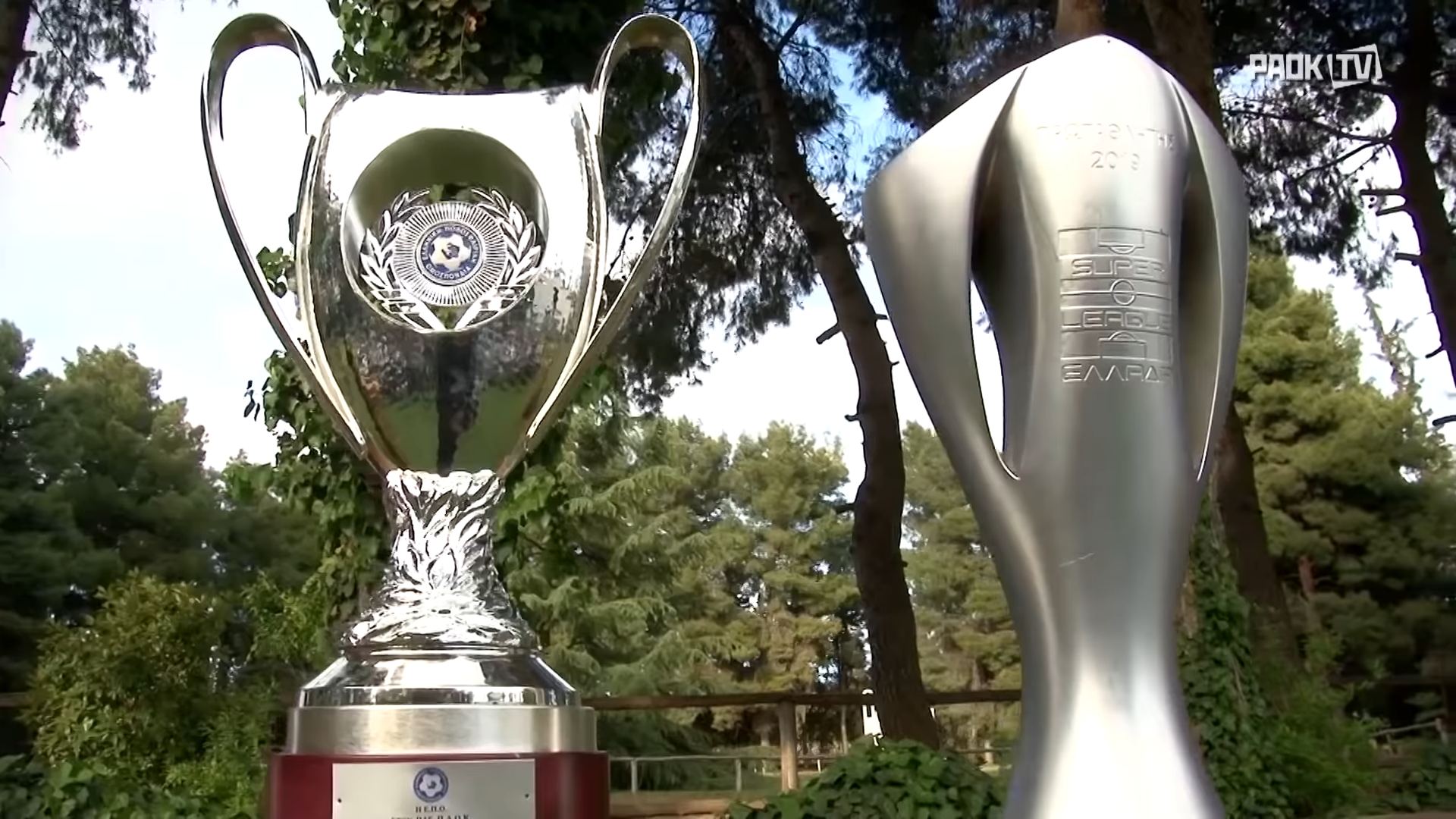
May 2019, team celebration party. Cup (left) and League (right) trophies

=== Double ===
- Winners (1): 2018–19

=== European competitions ===
- European Cup/UEFA Champions League
  - Round of 16 (1): 1976–77
- UEFA Cup Winners' Cup:
  - Quarter-finalists (1): 1973–74
- UEFA Europa League:
  - Round of 24 (2): 2024–25, 2025–26
- UEFA Conference League
  - Quarter-finalists (2): 2021–22, 2023–24

=== Minor & Unofficial Titles ===
- Greater Greece Cup
  - Winners (1): 1973
- OPAP Summer League
  - Winners (2): 1969, 1974

== Player records ==
=== Appearances ===
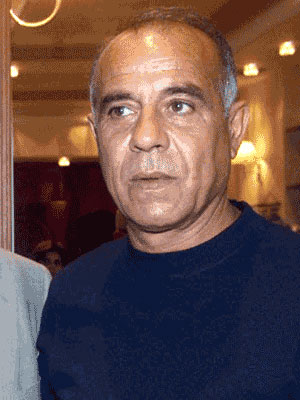
Giorgos Koudas, the most capped PAOK player with 607 games

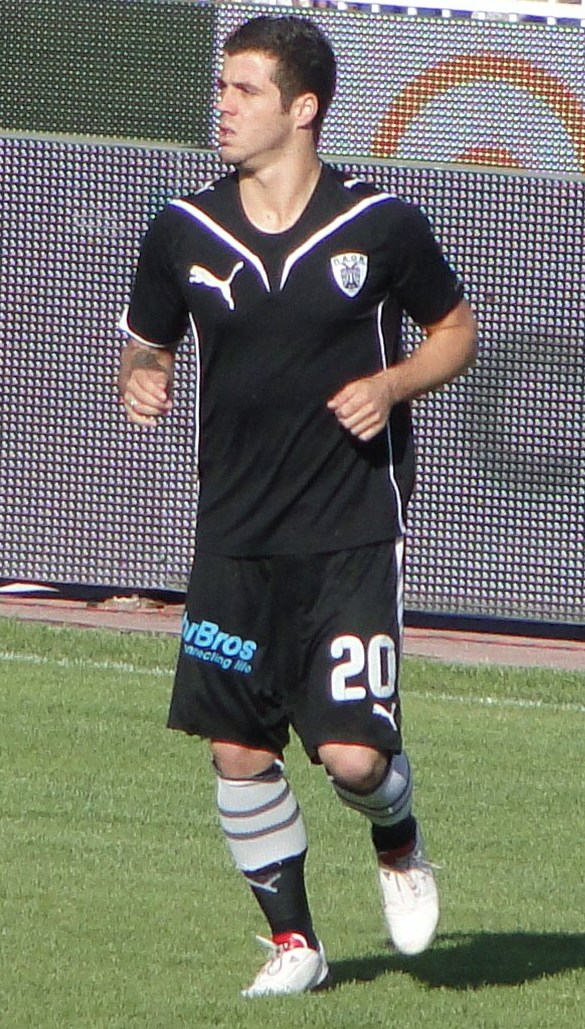
Vieirinha, PAOK most decorated player

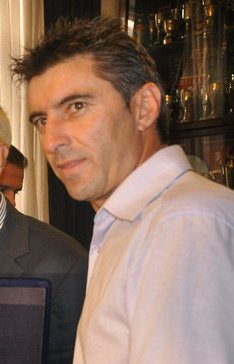
Theodoros Zagorakis recorded a total of 200 league apps with PAOK

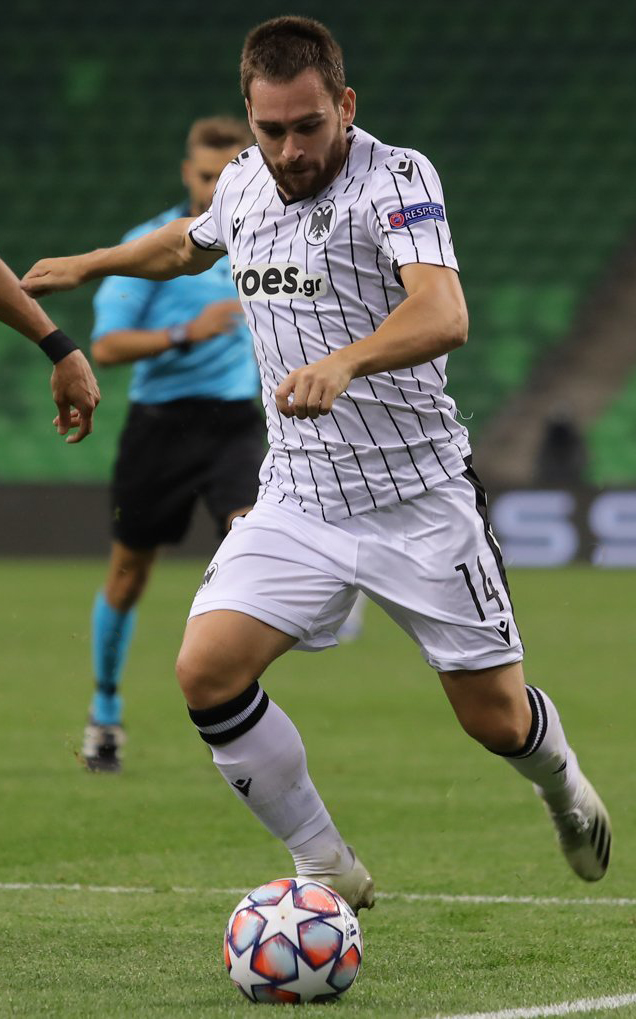
Andrija Živković has the most European caps in PAOK FC history

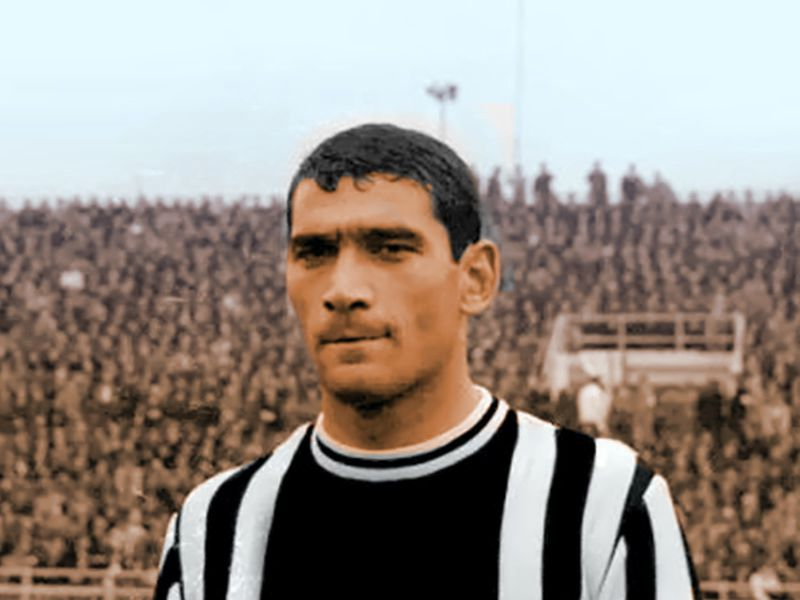
Aristos Fountoukidis ranks 5th in all-time appearances for PAOK

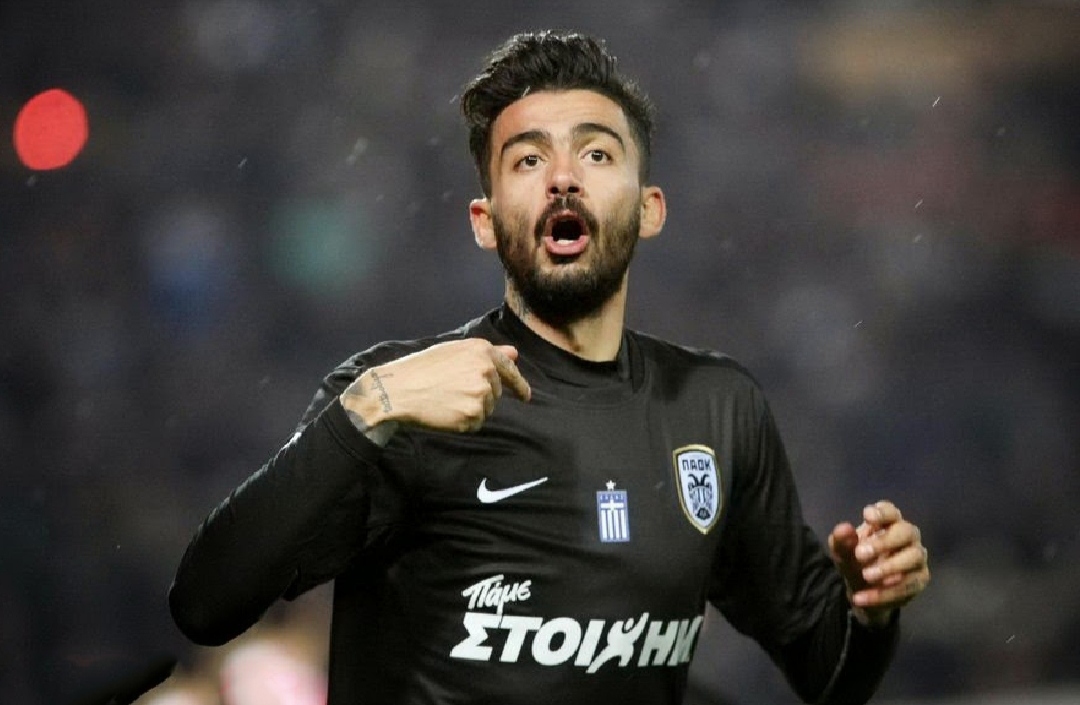
Stefanos Athanasiadis ranks as PAOK’s 5th all-time top goalscorer

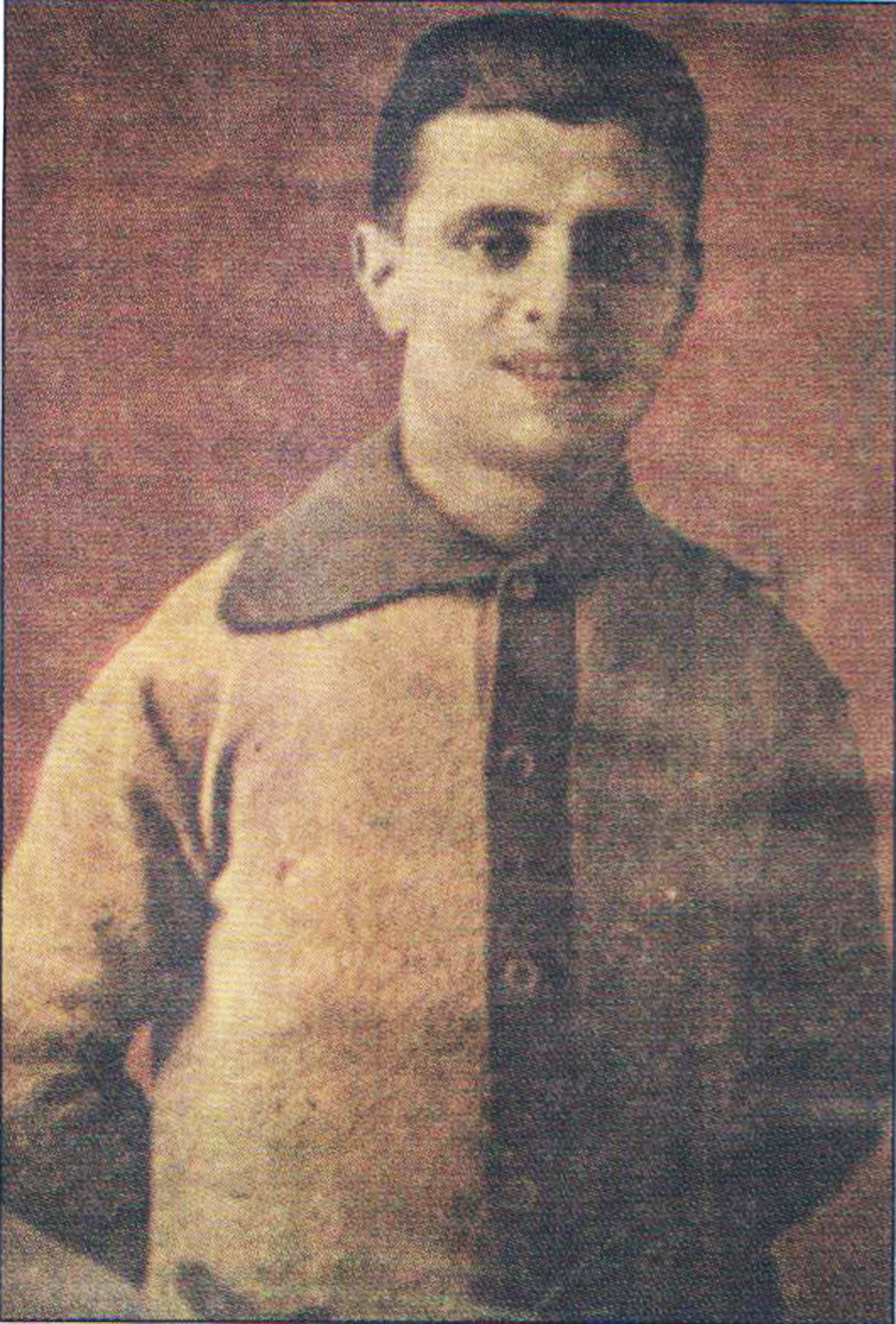
Christoforos Pantermalis, first player to score for PAOK

- Most appearances in all competitions: Giorgos Koudas, 607.
- Most league appearances: Giorgos Koudas, 504.
- Most Greek Cup appearances: Giorgos Koudas, 70.
- Most Greek Cup final appearances: Giorgos Koudas, 9.
- Most Continental appearances: Andrija Živković, 70.
- Youngest debutant: Apostolos Tsourelas, 16 years, 6 months and 18 days.
- Oldest first-team player: Vieirinha, 39 years, 3 months and 17 days.
- Most consecutive appearances: Giannis Nikolaidis, 106 (17 September 1961 → 11 October 1964).
- Most consecutive league appearances: Nikos Michopoulos, 107 (19 February 1995 → 8 March 1998).
- Longest-serving player: Giorgos Koudas, 20 years, 5 months and 2 days (21 December 1963 → 23 May 1984).
- Most decorated player: Vieirinha, 5 trophies (2 Championships, 3 Cups) - Fernando Varela and José Ángel Crespo, 5 trophies (1 Championship, 4 Cups).
- Foreign player with most appearances: Vieirinha, 344.
- Most appearances as a substitute: Diego Biseswar, 97 (251 total apps).
- Most times subbed off: Dimitris Salpingidis, 133 (306 apps as a starter).

Players with most appearances for PAOK FC
Rank	Player	Years	League	Cup	Europe (Note: Includes the Inter-Cities Fairs Cup apps.)	Total
1	(Greece) Giorgos Koudas	1963–1984	504	70	33	607
2	(Greece) Kostas Iosifidis	1971–1985	397	69	28	494
3	(Greece) Giannis Gounaris	1970–1982	376	59	22	457
4	(Greece) Stavros Sarafis	1967–1981	358	54	21	433
5	(Greece) Aristos Fountoukidis	1966–1978	336	43	16	395
6	(Greece) Dimitris Salpingidis	1999; 2002–2006; 2010–2015	262	36	60	358
7	(Portugal) Vieirinha	2008–2012; 2017–2025	253	35	56	344
8	(Greece) Giorgos Skartados	1982–1992	265	59	18	342
9	(Greece) Giorgos Toursounidis	1988–1999	261	62	17	341 (Note: Toursounidis made 1 Greek League Cup app.)
10	(Greece) Koulis Apostolidis	1963–1965; 1971–1979	281	36	21	338

Most league appearances:

Rank	Name	Apps
**1**	(Greece) Giorgos Koudas	**504**
2	(Greece) Kostas Iosifidis	397
3	(Greece) Giannis Gounaris	376
4	(Greece) Stavros Sarafis	358
5	(Greece) Aristos Fountoukidis	336
6	(Greece) Koulis Apostolidis	281
7	(Greece) Giorgos Skartados	265
8	(Greece) Dimitris Salpingidis	262
9	(Greece) Giorgos Toursounidis	261
10	(Portugal) Vieirinha	253
11	(Greece) Giannis Giakoumis	252
12	(Greece) Giannis Nikolaidis	245
13	(Greece) Toulis Mouratidis	244
14	(Greece) Giannis Damanakis	242
15	(Greece) Nikos Alavantas	240
16	(Greece) Christos Terzanidis	237
17	(Greece) Giorgos Kostikos	233
17	(Brazil) Neto Guerino	233
17	(Greece) Panagiotis Kermanidis	233
20	(Greece) Kostas Lagonidis	228
21	(Greece) Filotas Pellios	222
22	(Serbia) Mladen Furtula	216
23	(Greece) Stefanos Borbokis	215
24	(Greece) Leandros Symeonidis	213
25	(Greece) Stefanos Athanasiadis	208
26	(Australia) John Anastasiadis	203
27	(Greece) Theodoros Zagorakis	200

=== Goalscorers ===
- Most goals in all competitions: Stavros Sarafis, 169.
- Most league goals: Stavros Sarafis, 136.
- Most Greek Cup goals: Giorgos Koudas, 27.
- Most Continental goals: Stefanos Athanasiadis, 20.
- First player to score for PAOK: Christoforos Pantermalis (PAOK – Nea Genea Kalamaria 3–1, 12 December 1926).
- Most goals in a season: Aleksandar Prijović, 27 (during the 2017–18 season).
- Most league goals in a season: Giorgos Koudas, 20 (during the 1968–69 Alpha Ethniki).
- Most Greek Cup goals in a season: Dimitris Raptopoulos, 12 (during the 1958–59 Greek Cup).
- Most continental goals in a season: Robert Mak, 9 (during the 2015–16 season).
- Most hat-tricks: Giorgos Kostikos, 6.
- Most hat-tricks in a season: Giorgos Kostikos, 3 - with 2 hat-tricks and 1 four-goal haul (during the 1981–82 season).
- Fastest hat-trick: Giorgos Kostikos, 15 minutes (Panachaiki – PAOK 0–3, 9 December 1984).
- Hat-trick of free kicks: Kostas Frantzeskos, 1 (PAOK – Kastoria 6–0, 25 May 1997).
- Most foot shot goals: Giorgos Koudas, 144.
- Most headed goals: Stavros Sarafis, 51.
- Most free kick goals: Kostas Frantzeskos, 32.
- Most penalties scored: Giorgos Skartados, 27 (out of 33 attempts - 81.8% conversion rate).
- Most consecutive penalties scored: Achilleas Aslanidis and Neto Guerino, 9.
- Most goals scored in a game: Dimitris Raptopoulos, 6 (PAOK – AE Chalastra 10–1, Greek Cup, 21 December 1958).
- Most goals scored as a substitute: Zvonimir Vukić and Nikos Frousos, 14.
- Most seasons as team's leading goalscorer: Giorgos Skartados, 6.
- Youngest goalscorer: Stefanos Tzimas, 17 years, 1 month and 26 days (PAOK – Ionikos 6–0, 5 March 2023).
- Oldest goalscorer: Vieirinha, 38 years, 3 months and 22 days (PAOK – Panathinaikos 4–1, 15 May 2024).

=== Top goalscorers ===
Top goalscorers for PAOK FC
Rank	Player	Years	League	Cup	Europe (Note: Includes goals scored in the Inter-Cities Fairs Cup.)	Total
1	(Greece) Stavros Sarafis	1967–1981	136	26	7	169
2	(Greece) Giorgos Koudas	1963–1984	133	27	4	164
3	(Greece) Dimitris Salpingidis	1999; 2002–2006; 2010–2015	90	9	14	113
4	(Greece) Giorgos Skartados	1982–1992	84	24	4	112
5	(Greece) Stefanos Athanasiadis	2007–2009; 2010–2017	71	15	20	106
6	(Greece) Lampis Kouiroukidis	1953–1960	80 (Note: Kouiroukidis league goals include those scored in MFCA regional matches.)	18	0	98
7	(Greece) Giorgos Kostikos	1977–1986	78	15	4	97
8	(Brazil) Neto Guerino	1974–1983	66	14	0	80
9	(Greece) Panagiotis Kermanidis	1973–1981	60	12	3	75
10	(Serbia) **Andrija Živković**	2020–present	47	7	19	73
11	(Greece) Achilleas Aslanidis	1968–1976	55	12	3	70
11	(Greece) Dimitris Paridis	1968–1977	49	18	3	70
13	(Greece) Christos Dimopoulos	1980–1985	47	14	5	66
13	(Greece) Leandros Symeonidis	1954–1969	55 (Note: Symeonidis scored 15 goals in the Panhellenic Championship era (before 1959) and 40 league goals (1959–1969).)	11	0	66
15	(Greece) Koulis Apostolidis	1963–1965; 1971–1979	51	11	0	62
15	(Greece) Giorgos Georgiadis	1999–2003; 2007–2008	45	14	3	62

*Bold indicates active player

Last updated: 22 November 2026

League top goalscorers:

Rank	Name	Goals
**1**	(Greece) Stavros Sarafis	**136**
2	(Greece) Giorgos Koudas	133
3	(Greece) Dimitris Salpingidis	90
4	(Greece) Giorgos Skartados	84
5	(Greece) Giorgos Kostikos	78
6	(Greece) Stefanos Athanasiadis	71
7	(Brazil) Neto Guerino	66
8	(Greece) Panagiotis Kermanidis	60
9	(Greece) Achilleas Aslanidis	55
10	(Greece) Koulis Apostolidis	51
11	(Greece) Kostas Orfanos	50
12	(Greece) Dimitris Paridis	49
12	(Greece) Anestis Afentoulidis	49
14	(Serbia) **Andrija Živković**	47
14	(Greece) Christos Dimopoulos	47
16	(Greece) Giorgos Georgiadis	45
16	(Greece) Kostas Frantzeskos	45
18	(Greece) Giannis Giakoumis	41
19	(Greece) Leandros Symeonidis	40
20	(Greece) Kostas Lagonidis	38
21	(Portugal) Vieirinha	36
22	(Greece) Giorgos Toursounidis	35
22	(Serbia) Aleksandar Prijović	35
24	(Greece) Apostolos Vasiliadis	33
24	(Greece) Paris Zouboulis	33
24	(Greece) Noulis Charalampidis	33
27	(Greece) Stefanos Borbokis	31

*Bold indicates active player

Last updated: 22 November 2026

=== Goalkeepers ===
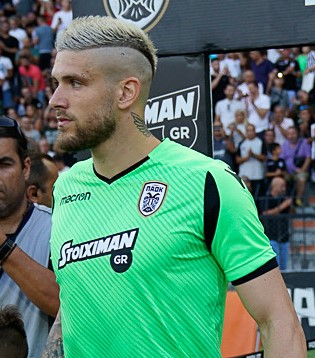
Alexandros Paschalakis has the longest clean sheet streak in PAOK FC history

- Most minutes without conceding a goal: Alexandros Paschalakis, 971 - if stoppage time is included, 1008 (during the 2017–18 season).
- Most clean sheets: Mladen Furtula, 137 from 277 games (from 1975 to 1984).
- Most clean sheets in a season: Kostas Chalkias, 24 from 38 games (during the 2009–10 season).
- Most penalties saved: Dominik Kotarski, Nikos Michopoulos and Mladen Furtula, 7.
- Most penalties saved in a season: Dominik Kotarski, 3 (during the 2023–24 and 2024–25 seasons).
- Most penalty shoot-out saves: Mladen Furtula, 6.
- Most penalty shoot-out saves in a game: Giannis Gitsioudis, 4 (Sparti – PAOK 1–0 (aet, 0–2 pen.), Greek Cup, 20 December 1989).

== Managerial records ==
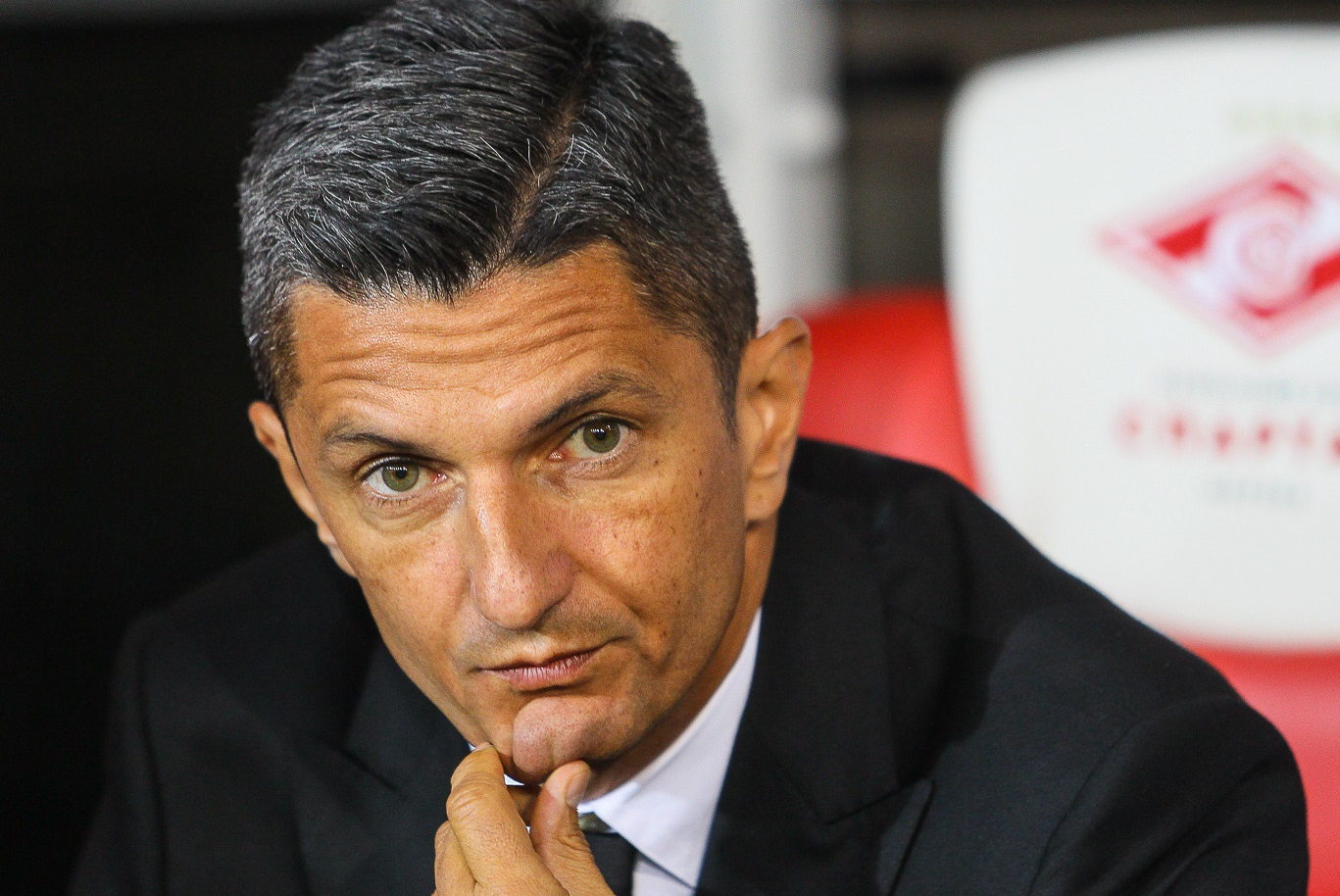
Răzvan Lucescu, most successful PAOK manager

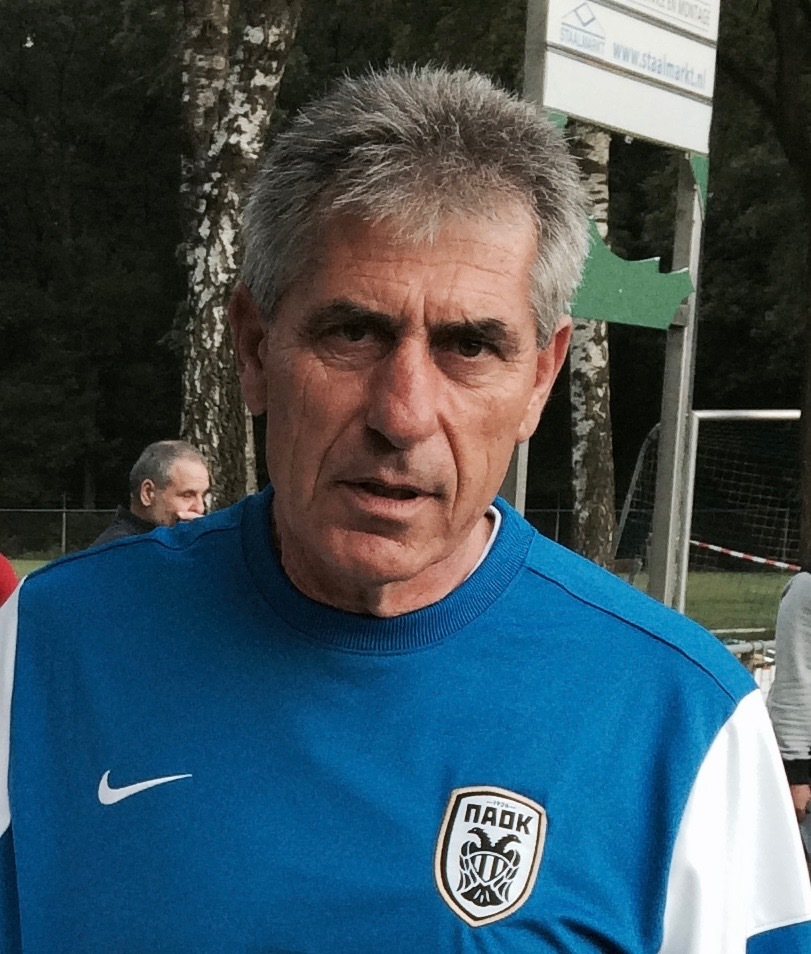
Angelos Anastasiadis won the Cup both as a player (1974) and manager (2003)

- First manager: Kostas Andreadis.
- Longest-serving manager by time: Răzvan Lucescu (7 seasons in total).
- Shortest-serving manager: Mario Beretta, 38 days (from June 14 to July 22, 2010).
- Most spells (not as caretaker): Angelos Anastasiadis, 4.
- Won a trophy both as a player and manager: Angelos Anastasiadis - 1 Cup (1974) and 1 Championship (1976) as a player, 1 Cup (2003) as a manager.
- Longest-serving manager by matches: Răzvan Lucescu, 361.
- Most wins: Răzvan Lucescu, 215.
- Highest winning percentage: Răzvan Lucescu, 59.5%.
- Most trophies: Răzvan Lucescu, 4 (2 Championships, 2 Cups).

Managers who won a domestic title with PAOK:

Name	League	Cup
(Romania) Răzvan Lucescu	2 (2019, 2024)	2 (2018, 2019)
(Hungary) Gyula Lóránt	1 (1976)	
(Austria) Walter Skocik	1 (1985)	
(England) Les Shannon		2 (1972, 1974)
(Bosnia and Herzegovina) Dušan Bajević		1 (2001)
(Greece) Angelos Anastasiadis		1 (2003)
(Serbia) Vladimir Ivić		1 (2017)
(Uruguay) Pablo García		1 (2021)

== Club records ==
=== Matches ===
==== Firsts ====
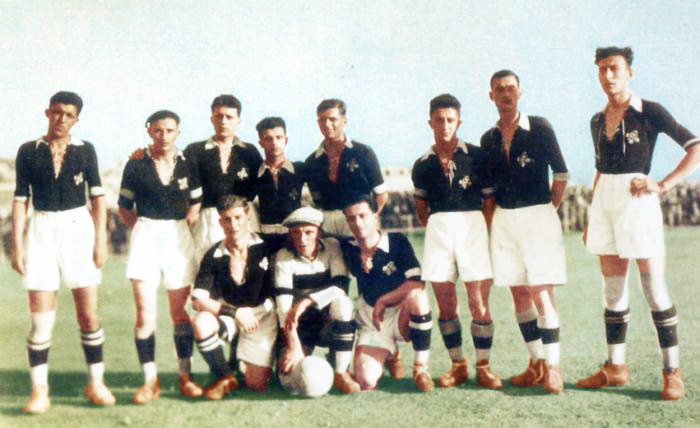
PAOK in 1926 Standing (left to right): Andreadis, Makaronopoulos, Vlachou, Pantermalis, Pagalos, Tsolakidis, Lianopoulos, Georgiadis Seated: Christidis, Papadopoulos, Ventourelis

- First match: (friendly) PAOK – Megas Alexandros Thessaloniki 2–1, 4 May 1926.
- First official match: (EPSM) PAOK – Nea Genea Kalamaria 3–1, 12 December 1926.
- First Panhellenic Championship final stage (1928–1959) match: Olympiacos – PAOK 3–1, 1 February 1931.
- First league match: PAOK – Megas Alexandros Katerini 3–2, 25 October 1959.
- First Greek Cup match: PAOK – Meliteas 3–0, 27 September 1931.
- First European match:

(Inter-Cities Fairs Cup) PAOK – Wiener SC 2–1, 15 September 1965.
(UEFA Cup Winners' Cup) Rapid Wien – PAOK 0–0, 13 September 1972.

==== Wins ====
- Record Panhellenic Championship final stage (1928–1959) win: PAOK – Panetolikos 7–1, 18 May 1955.
- Record league win:

(Home) PAOK – Lamia 7–0, 16 February 2025.
(Away) A.E. Kifisia – PAOK 0–6, 21 December 2023.

- Record Greek Cup win:

(Home) PAOK – Atlantis Thessaloniki 11–0, 18 October 1959.
(Away) Lamia – PAOK 1–9, 20 February 1985.

- Record European win:

(Away) Locomotive Tbilisi – PAOK 0–7, UEFA Cup, 16 September 1999. (Domestic record)
(Home) PAOK – Lokomotiva Zagreb 6–0, UEFA Europa League, 23 July 2015.

- Most wins in a season: 40 wins from 58 games (during the 2023–24 season).
- Most league wins in a season:

27 wins from 34 games (during the 1972–73 Alpha Ethniki).
26 wins from 30 games (during the 2018–19 Super League Greece).

- Fewest league wins in a season: 7 wins from 30 games (during the 1960–61 Alpha Ethniki).
- Most consecutive wins: 15 (during the 2017–18 season).
- Most consecutive home wins: 27 (8 November 1978 → 24 February 1980).
- Most consecutive league wins: 10 (during the 2017–18 Super League Greece).
- Most consecutive league wins from start of season: 8 (during the 2018–19 Super League Greece).
- Most consecutive Greek Cup wins at Toumba: 50 (16 April 1969 → 30 November 1988, PAOK had 1 draw and 1 defeat on Greek Cup home games held at other venues).
- Most consecutive continental wins: 6 (during the 2023–24 season).
- Biggest comeback win: PAOK – Spartak Trnava 5–3, UEFA Cup, 12 August 1997 (down 0–3 in the 27th minute).

==== Defeats ====
- Record Panhellenic Championship final stage (1928–1959) defeat: Panathinaikos – PAOK 7–1, 28 June 1931.
- Record league defeat: Olympiacos – PAOK 6–0, 3 June 1962.
- Record Greek Cup defeat: 4–0 on 5 occasions, vs Olympiacos (1951 and 1975), vs AEK Athens (1965 and 2002) and vs PAS Giannina (2010)
- Record European defeat:

(Inter-Cities Fairs Cup) Wiener SC – PAOK 6–0, 28 September 1965.
(UEFA Cup) Barcelona – PAOK 6–1, 1 October 1975.

- Record European defeat at Toumba: (UEFA Champions League) PAOK – Benfica 1–4, 29 August 2018.
- Most league defeats in a season: 15 in 30 matches (during the 2007–08 Super League Greece).
- Fewest league defeats in a season: Unbeaten in 30 matches (during the 2018–19 Super League Greece). (Domestic record, shared with Panathinaikos)
- Most consecutive undefeated league games: 51 (11 March 2018 → 4 January 2020).
- Most consecutive undefeated Greek Cup games at Toumba: 80 (16 April 1969 → 31 January 1996, PAOK had 1 defeat on a Greek Cup home game held at Kaftanzoglio Stadium).
- Most consecutive defeats:

=== Goals ===
- Highest goals scored per game average in a season: 2.38 (during the 2000–01 season).
- Most goals scored in a season: 135 in 58 games (during the 2023–24 season).
- Most league goals scored in a season: 87 in 36 games (during the 2023–24 Super League Greece).
- Most league goals scored at home in a season: 60 in 17 games (during the 1978–79 Alpha Ethniki).
- Fewest league goals scored in a season: 22 in 30 games (during the 1963–64 Alpha Ethniki).
- Most league goals conceded in a season: 49 in 30 games (during the 1965–66 Alpha Ethniki).
- Fewest league goals conceded in a season: 14 in 30 games (during the 2018–19 Super League Greece).
- Fewest league goals conceded at home in a season: 3 in 17 games (during the 1994–95 Alpha Ethniki). (Domestic record)
- Most consecutive league games scoring: 69 (PAOK lost two home games 0–3 by court decision during this period that are not taken into account). (Domestic record)
- Most consecutive league games scoring away: 35 (26 November 2017 → 23 January 2020). (Domestic record)

=== Points ===
- Most points in a season:

Point system (3–2–1): 92 (in 34 matches in 1972–73 Alpha Ethniki).
Point system (2–1–0): 49 (in 30 matches in 1975–76 Alpha Ethniki) and 52 (in 34 matches in 1976–77 Alpha Ethniki).
Point system (3–1–0): 82 (in 30 matches in 2018–19 Super League Greece).

- Fewest points in a season:

Point system (3–2–1): 57 (in 30 matches in 1963–64 Alpha Ethniki).
Point system (2–1–0): 27 (in 30 matches in 1985–86 Alpha Ethniki).
Point system (3–1–0): 35 (in 30 matches in 2007–08 Super League Greece).

- Most points in a European competition group stage: 16 (2023–24 UEFA Conference League). (Domestic record)
- Most points in the UEFA Europa League group stage: 12 (2011–12 and 2013–14). (Domestic record, shared with Panathinaikos)
- Fewest points in the UEFA Europa League group stage: 3 (2018–19).

=== Attendances ===
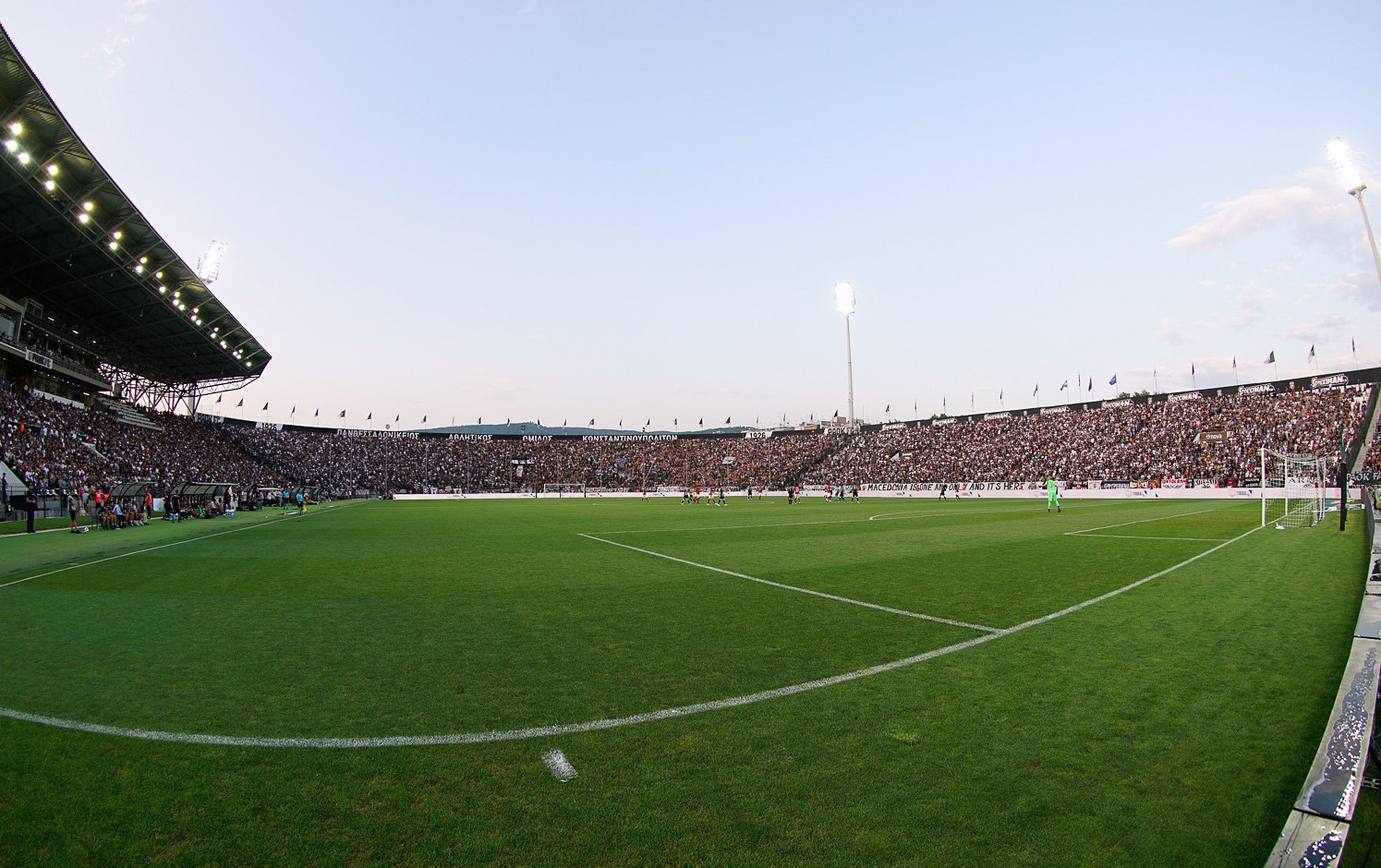
Toumba Stadium, PAOK home ground

- Season ticket sales record: 22,154 (77.19% of the total capacity - August 2019).
- Highest league home attendance: 45,252 (0–0 against AEK Athens, 19 December 1976).
- Highest Greek Cup home attendance: 44,045 (2–1 against AEK Athens, 9 February 1977).
- Highest European home attendance: 45,200 (1–0 against Barcelona, UEFA Cup, 16 September 1975).
- Lowest league home attendance: 381 (1–0 against Athinaikos, 30 May 1993).
- Lowest Greek Cup home attendance: 164 (3–1 against Kavala, 29 November 2000).
- Lowest European home attendance: 1,012 (5–1 against Rennes, UEFA Cup, 14 December 2005).
- Highest league away attendance: 74,232 (Olympiacos – PAOK 0–1, 2 October 1988)^{*} and 74,043 (Panathinaikos – PAOK 0–1, 20 January 1985) – Athens Olympic Stadium.
- Highest Greek Cup away attendance: 48,104 (Panathinaikos – PAOK 2–0, 22 May 1985) – Athens Olympic Stadium.
- Highest European away attendance: 73,174 (Manchester United – PAOK 2–0, UEFA Europa League, 7 November 2024) – Old Trafford.
- Lowest European away attendance: 668 (Lincoln Red Imps – PAOK 0–2, UEFA Conference League, 16 September 2021) – Victoria Stadium.
- Highest neutral ground attendance: 72,240 (AEK Athens – PAOK 2–0, Greek Cup final, 29 June 1983) – Athens Olympic Stadium.

^{*} Due to the International Amnesty Concert which was scheduled for the following day, some gates of the Athens Olympic Stadium were closed. Olympiacos had already acquired the tickets of those gates which were included in the attendance count.

=== Domestic records ===
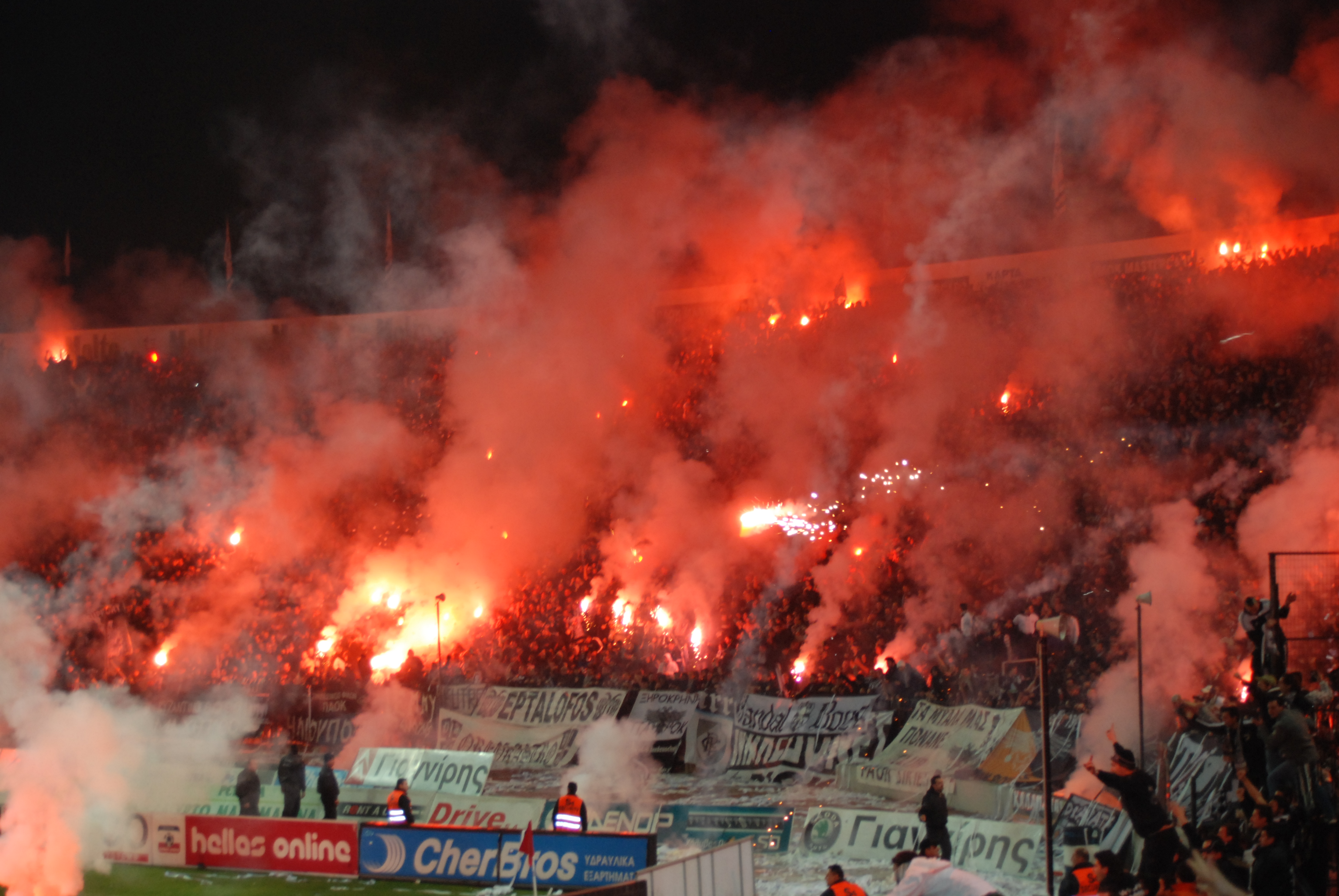
PAOK fans during a Greek Cup derby against Olympiacos at Toumba Stadium (February 2009)

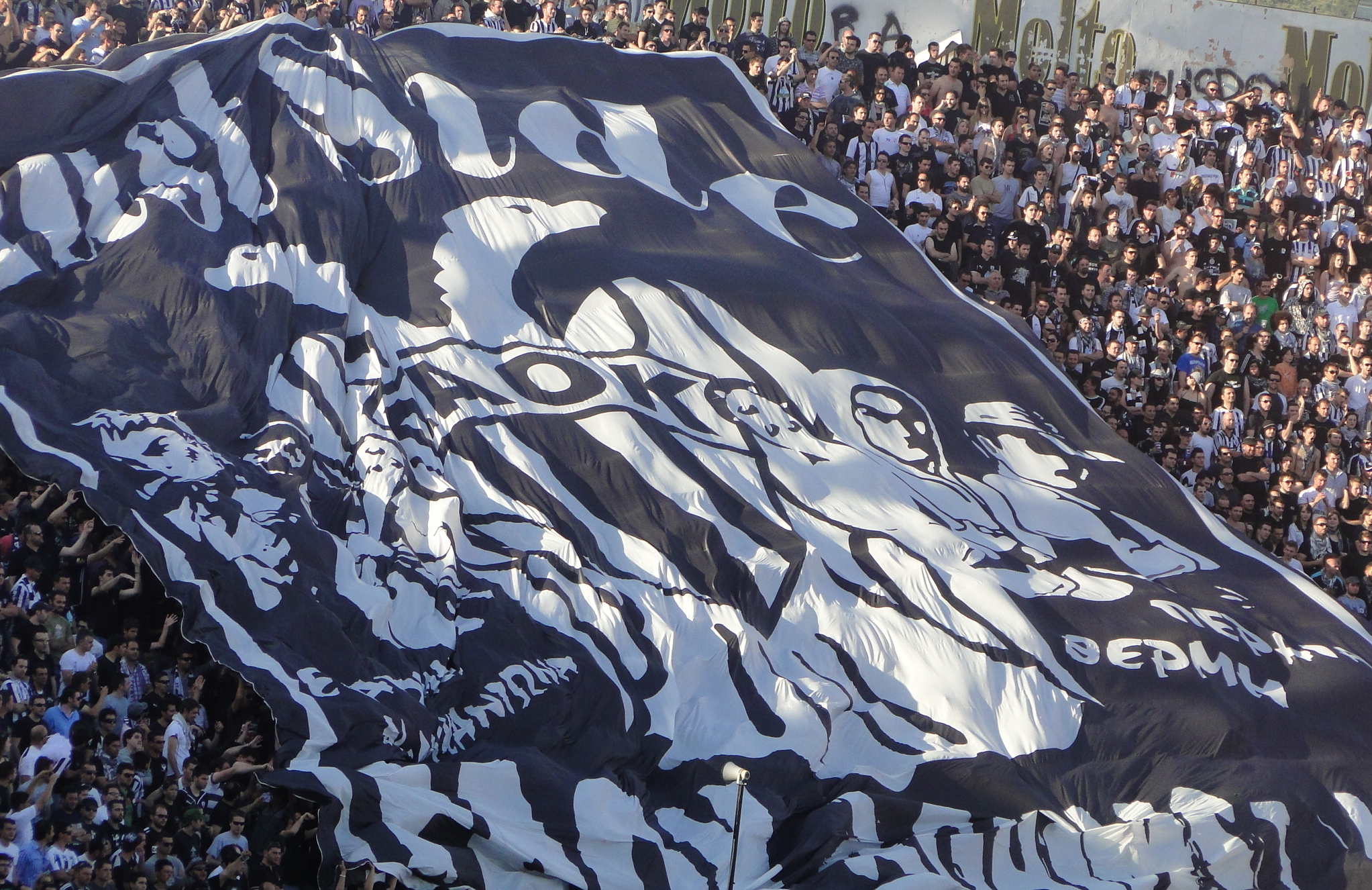
PAOK fans East Side banner displayed in the stands of Gate 4 before a derby against Olympiacos at Toumba Stadium (May 2010)

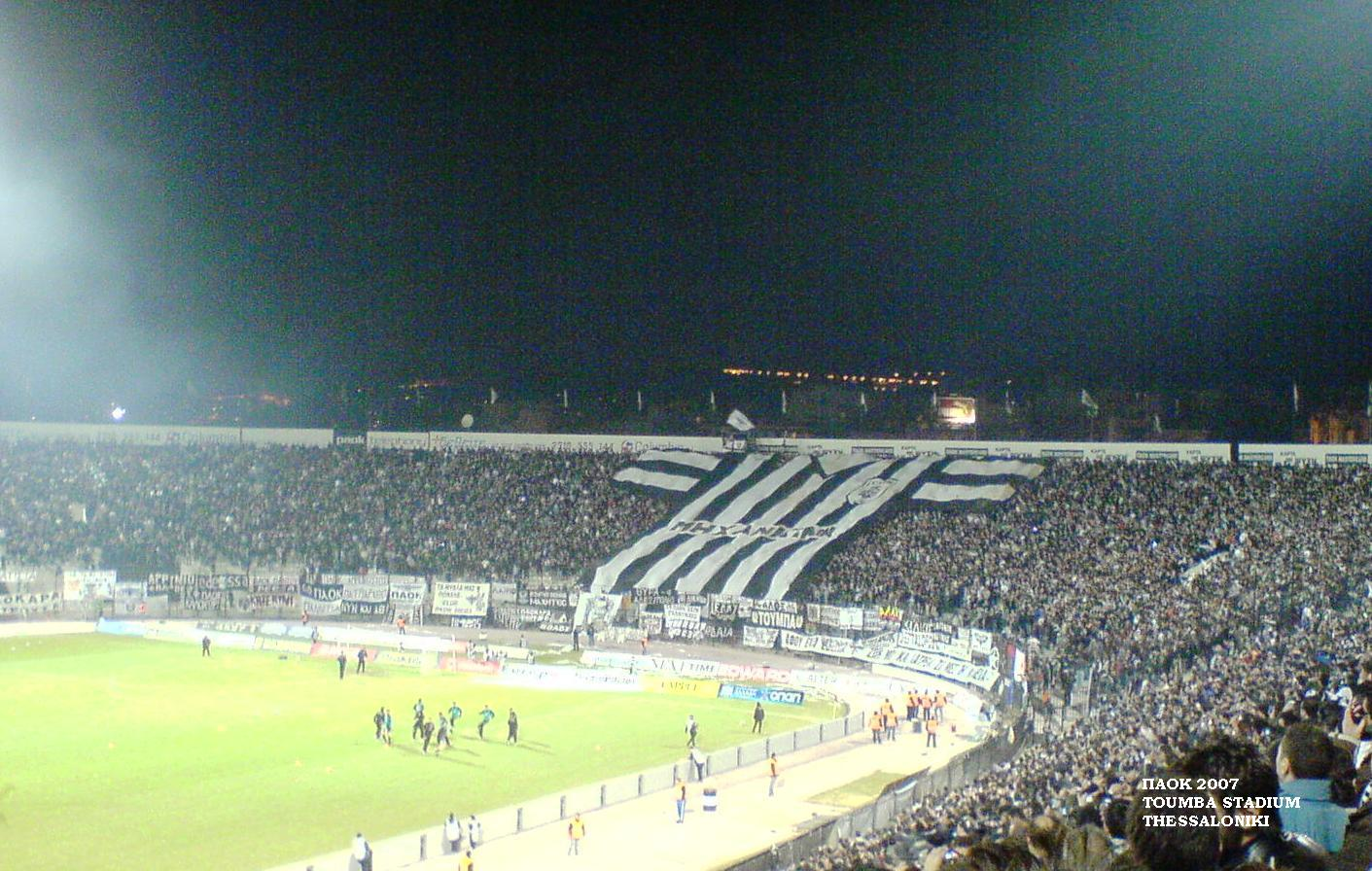
A large black-and-white jersey displayed in the stands of Gate 4 at Toumba Stadium (2007)

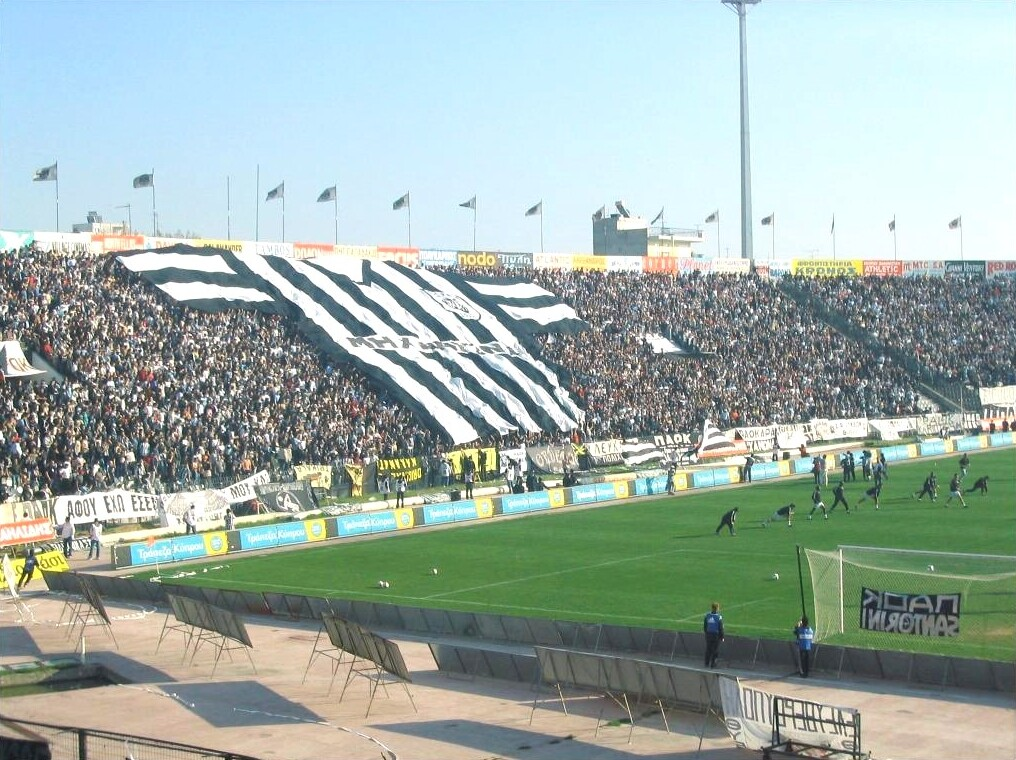
The giant black-and-white shirt draped over the stands in Gates 5-6 before a derby against AEK Athens at Toumba Stadium (March 2004)

Outline	Record
Double winners, going unbeaten in a national round-robin league tournament (league format since 1959).	2018–19 season
Champions, starting the season with a points deduction.	2018–19 Super League Greece (PAOK started the season on –2 points)
Worst league title defence.	10th place (1985–86)
Most consecutive league games scoring.	69 (PAOK lost two games 0–3 by court decision during this period that are not taken into account)
Most consecutive league games scoring away.	35 (26/11/2017 → 23/1/2020)
Fewest league goals conceded at home in a season.	3 in 17 games (1994–95)
Most seasons with a points deduction.	9 (1963–64, 1986–87, 1990–91, 1995–96, 2013–14, 2015–16, 2016–17, 2017–18, 2018–19)
Most consecutive seasons with a points deduction.	4 (2015–16, 2016–17, 2017–18, 2018–19)
Most league wins against Olympiacos.	49
Record league win against Olympiacos.	PAOK 6–1 Olympiacos (6/12/1987) – Serres Municipal Stadium
Record league away win against Olympiacos.	Olympiacos 0–4 PAOK (4/1/1976) – Karaiskakis Stadium
Away comeback win from 0–2 down against AEK Athens.	AEK Athens 2–3 PAOK (30/3/2025) – Agia Sophia Stadium
Winners of 3 consecutive Greek Cup finals against the same opponent.	2017, 2018 and 2019 Greek Cup finals (vs AEK Athens)
Winners of 2 consecutive Greek Cup finals that were held at the opponent's home ground.	2018 and 2019 Greek Cup finals (held at Athens Olympic Stadium, AEK Athens home ground at the time)
Greek Cup runners-up.	16 times
Biggest European win by a Greek football club.	Locomotive Tbilisi 0–7 PAOK (16/9/1999, UEFA Cup)
Most points in a European competition group stage.	16 (W5–D1–L0), 2023–24 UEFA Conference League
Consecutive continental away wins.	4 (2023–24 season)
Won all away matches in the group stage of a European competition.	3 (2023–24 UEFA Conference League)
Most UEFA Europa League appearances.	31
Most consecutive UEFA Europa League appearances.	12
Most UEFA Conference League matches.	36

=== European record ===
Competition	App	Pld	W	D	L	Goals
European Cup / Champions League	10	32	8	10	14	45–57
UEFA Cup / Europa League	31	178	68	49	61	254–209
UEFA Conference League	4	36	18	8	10	58–38
UEFA Cup Winners' Cup	6	18	8	5	5	24–23
Inter-Cities Fairs Cup	3	6	2	0	4	5–17
Total	54	270	104	72	94	386–344

Last updated: 27 August 2026

== Bibliography ==
- Kyritsis, Dimitris; Stefanidis, Anestis; Tsiompanoudi, Eleni (2005). ΠΑΟΚ, Πανθεσσαλονίκειος Αθλητικός Όμιλος Κωνσταντινοπουλιτών 1926–2005 [PAOK, Pan-Thessalonian Athletic Club of Constantinopolitans 1926–2005] (in Greek). Greece: Thessaloniki History Center. ISBN 978-960-88595-2-4.
- Bliatkas, Kostas (2005). Γιώργος Κούδας, της ζωής μου το παιχνίδι [Giorgos Koudas, the game of my life] (in Greek). Greece: Ianos Publications. ISBN 978-960-7827-35-7.
- Collective work (2009). Για πάντα πρωταθλητές, Π.Α.Ο.Κ. Ποδόσφαιρο-Μπάσκετ [Champions forever, P.A.O.K. Football-Basketball] (in Greek). Greece: SKAI. ISBN 978-960-482-020-7.
- Tsallos, Alexios (2010). Το αλφαβητάρι του ΠΑΟΚ [The PAOK alphabet book] (in Greek). Greece: Diavlos Publications. ISBN 978-960-531-259-6.
- Petrakopoulos, Stavros (2016). Τα «μυθικά» του ΠΑΟΚ [PAOK’s ‘legendary’ moments] (in Greek). Greece: Friends Press. ISBN 978-618-82397-0-8.
- Pappous, Michalis (2019). Ο ΠΑΟΚ του '70 [The PAOK of the '70s] (in Greek). Greece: University Studio Press. ISBN 978-960-12-2421-3.
- Vasilopoulos, Kostas (2023). Ραζβάν Λουτσέσκου, Double PAOK [Razvan Lucescu, Double PAOK] (in Greek). Greece: Fereniki Publications. ISBN 978-960-9513-89-0.
