= Georgios Kostikos =

Georgios Kostikos may refer to:

- Georgios Kostikos (footballer, born 1958)
- Georgios Kostikos (footballer, born 1997)
