= Konstantinos Orfanos =

Greek footballer

Kostas Orfanos
Personal information
- Full name: Konstantinos Orfanos
- Date of birth: 22 August 1956 (age 70)
- Place of birth: Thessaloniki, Greece
- Position: Forward

Youth career
- 1969–1975: PAOK

Senior career*
Years	Team	Apps	(Gls)
1975–1980	PAOK	125	(49)
1980–1985	Olympiacos	111	(20)
1985–1986	PAOK	25	(1)
1986–1988	Apollon Kalamarias	39	(6)
Total		300	(76)

International career
1977–1981	Greece	8	(0)
- * Club domestic league appearances and goals

Konstantinos Orfanos (Greek: Κωνσταντίνος Ορφανός; born 22 August 1956) is a former Greek international footballer who played as a forward for PAOK and Olympiacos.

== Career ==
=== Club career ===
Orfanos joined the youth ranks of PAOK in 1969, aged 13. He made his first-team debut in the Alpha Ethniki during the 1975–76 season under the Hungarian manager Gyula Lóránt. In his debut year, PAOK won the 1976 Greek league title. Orfanos enjoyed another four productive seasons with the White-blacks of the North, recording 149 appearances in all competitions and scoring 59 goals (125 apps and 49 goals in the league, 18 apps and 9 goals in the Greek Cup, 6 apps and 1 goal in European competitions).

In 1980, he was transferred to rivals Olympiacos for a fee of 21 million drachmas and played for five years, winning three league titles (in 1981, 1982 and 1983) and one Greek Cup (in 1981). In the summer of 1985, he returned to PAOK for a second spell and played for one-and-a-half year. In December 1986, he moved to Apollon Kalamarias and ended his career two years later.

=== International career ===
Orfanos had 8 caps for the Greece national team, between 1977 and 1981.

== Other football-related activities ==
"The way we went out to the pitch mattered. Koudas would urge me, "Come on, kid!" and I ’d go out all excited. Incredible feelings. Even now, attending games as a fan, the atmosphere here is unique...PAOK..."

— Orfanos moved to tears during Nikos Triantafyllidis' documentary 90 Years of PAOK: Nostalgia for the Future (2016)

In 1997, when Giorgos Batatoudis became the major shareholder of PAOK, he got involved in the club's administration, serving as vice-president.

In June 2006, Orfanos assumed leadership of an emergency steering committee formed to rescue PAOK from its severe financial crisis under the Giannis Goumenos presidency. During this six-month tenure, the committee managed interim club operations until late November 2006, when Goumenos' resignation led to a court-appointed administration.

Orfanos is one of the co-founders of the Arsakli football academy, founded in 2015, in Panorama, Thessaloniki alongside Giorgos Koudas, Vasilis Vasilakos, Neto Guerino, Koulis Apostolidis and others.

== Personal ==
Orfanos holds a degree in Civil Engineering, a profession he pursued after retiring from football. His brother is the politician Georgios Orfanos who served as a Member of the Hellenic Parliament for New Democracy and held the positions of Deputy Minister for Sports (2004-2007) and later, Minister of Macedonia and Thrace (2014-2015). His son is former footballer Dimitrios Orfanos who also played for PAOK and Apollon Kalamarias. The Orfanos family originates from Agia Triada, Evrytania.

== Career statistics ==
=== Club career ===
Appearances and goals by club, season and competition
Club	Season	Greek League		Greek Cup		Continental		Total	
Club	Season	Apps	Goals	Apps	Goals	Apps	Goals	Apps	Goals
PAOK	1975–76	8	1	1	0	0	0	9	1
PAOK	1976–77	24	11	5	3	1	0	30	14
PAOK	1977–78	33	15	6	5	4	1	43	21
PAOK	1978–79	32	15	2	0	1	0	35	15
PAOK	1979–80	28	7	4	1	–		32	8
PAOK	Total	125	49	18	9	6	1	149	59
Olympiacos	1980–81	32	9			2	0		
Olympiacos	1981–82	28	1	2	4	2	0	32	5
Olympiacos	1982–83	19	1			2	0		
Olympiacos	1983–84	17	4	3	0	1	0	20	4
Olympiacos	1984–85	15	5			0	0		
Olympiacos	Total	111	20			7	0		
PAOK	1985–86	23	1	2	0	2	0	27	1
PAOK	1986–87 (i)	2	0	1	1	–		3	1
PAOK	Total	25	1	3	1	2	0	30	2
Apollon Kalamarias	1986–87 (ii)	14	4			–			
Apollon Kalamarias	1987–88	18	2			–			
Apollon Kalamarias	1988–89 (i)	7	0			–			
Apollon Kalamarias	Total	39	6			–			
PAOK total		150	50	21	10	8	1	179	61
Career total		300	76			15	1		

Source: RSSSF

=== International career ===
National team	Year	Caps
Greece
Greece	1977	2
Greece	1978	2
Greece	1979	2
Greece	1980	1
Greece	1981	1
Total		8

== Honours ==
PAOK

- Alpha Ethniki: 1975–76

Olympiacos

- Alpha Ethniki: 1980–81, 1981–82, 1982–83
- Greek Cup: 1980–81

== Bibliography ==
- Bliatkas, Kostas (2005). Γιώργος Κούδας, της ζωής μου το παιχνίδι [Giorgos Koudas, the game of my life] (in Greek). Greece: Ianos Publications. ISBN 978-960-7827-35-7.
- Pappous, Michalis (2019). Ο ΠΑΟΚ του '70 [The PAOK of the '70s] (in Greek). Greece: University Studio Press. ISBN 978-960-12-2421-3.
