= Georgios Kostikos (footballer, born 1997) =

Greek footballer

Personal information
- Full name: Georgios Kostikos
- Date of birth: 20 October 1997 (age 29)
- Place of birth: Thessaloniki, Greece
- Height: 1.85 m (6 ft 1 in)
- Position: Midfielder

Youth career
- 2012–2014: Iraklis

Senior career*
Years	Team	Apps	(Gls)
2014–2016	Aiginiakos	1	(0)
2016–2017	Panthrakikos	1	(0)
2017	Pydna Kitros	8	(1)
2017–2018	Pierikos	24	(0)
2018–2020	Platanias	19	(3)
2020–2021	Trikala	1	(0)
2021	Niki Volos	2	(0)
2021–2022	AEP Kozani		
2022–	Poseidon Michanionas		
- * Club domestic league appearances and goals as of 26 June 2021

Georgios Kostikos (Greek: Γεώργιος Κωστίκος; born 20 October 1997) is a Greek professional footballer who plays as a midfielder.

== Personal ==
His father, Georgios Kostikos was an international footballer who played most notably for Olympiacos and PAOK.
