= Ib Jacquet =

Danish footballer (born 1956)

Personal information
- Full name: Ib Sigfred Jacquet
- Date of birth: 12 April 1956 (age 70)
- Place of birth: Denmark
- Position: Forward

Youth career
- Vejle BK

Senior career*
Years	Team	Apps	(Gls)
1975–1978	Vejle BK	210	(81)
1978–1980	FC Antwerp	18	(7)
1980-1982	Vejle BK		
1983	Kolding		
1984	B 1909		
1985-1986	Vejle BK		

International career^{‡}
1973	Denmark U-19	1	(0)
1977	Denmark U-21	2	(0)
- * Club domestic league appearances and goals as of 22:55, 10 May 2008 (UTC) ‡ National team caps and goals as of May 23, 2008

Ib Sigfred Jacquet (born 12 April 1956) is a Danish former football player.

== Club career ==
Ib Jacquet played in the forward position and was known as an unpredictable and entertaining player. He played 210 games and scored 81 goals for Vejle Boldklub. In 1982, he was the topscorer of the Danish football championship. He had a spell with Belgian side Antwerp in the end of the 1970s. He finished his career on 22 May 1986 in a match against Esbjerg.

== International career ==
He played two games for the Denmark U21 team.

== Honours ==
- Danish 1st Division: 1

1984
