= Leandros Symeonidis =

Greek footballer

Personal information
- Date of birth: 13 August 1937 (age 89)
- Place of birth: Kilkis, Greece
- Position: Right winger

Youth career
- 1950–1954: PAOK

Senior career*
Years	Team	Apps	(Gls)
1954–1969	PAOK	323	(67)

International career
1960–1963	Greece	6	(0)
- * Club domestic league appearances and goals

Leandros Symeonidis (Greek: Λέανδρος Συμεωνίδης; born 13 August 1937) is a Greek former football player who spent his entire career in PAOK, playing as a right winger.

Symeonidis played 6 games for the Greece national team between 1960 and 1963. His nephew is professional football player Efthymis Koulouris.
