= Egon Piechaczek =

Polish footballer (1931–2006)

Personal information
- Date of birth: 16 November 1931
- Place of birth: Chorzów, Poland
- Date of death: 23 October 2006 (aged 74)
- Place of death: Kaiserslautern, Germany
- Position: Striker

Youth career
- –1951: Budowlani Chorzów

Senior career*
Years	Team	Apps	(Gls)
1951–1953	CWKS Kraków		
1954	Budowlani Chorzów		
1954	CWKS Warsaw		
1955–1956	CWKS Kraków		
1957–1959	Ruch Chorzów		
1960–1961	Odra Opole		
1963–1964	FSV Frankfurt		

Managerial career
- 1968–1969: 1. FC Kaiserslautern
- 1969–1971: Arminia Bielefeld
- 1978–1980: PAOK
- 1981–1982: Panserraikos
- 1983–1984: Panionios
- 1986–1987: Apollon Limassol
- * Club domestic league appearances and goals

Egon Piechaczek (16 November 1931 – 23 October 2006) was a Polish footballer and manager.

== Career ==
He played for Budowlani Chorzów, CWKS Kraków, CWKS Warsaw, Ruch Chorzów, Odra Opole and FSV Frankfurt.

== Coaching career ==
He coached 1. FC Kaiserslautern and Arminia Bielefeld in Germany. He was involved in the 1971 Bundesliga scandal. He later coached PAOK, Panserraikos, Panionios and Apollon Limassol.
