= Georgios Kostikos (footballer, born 1958) =

Greek footballer

Giorgos Kostikos
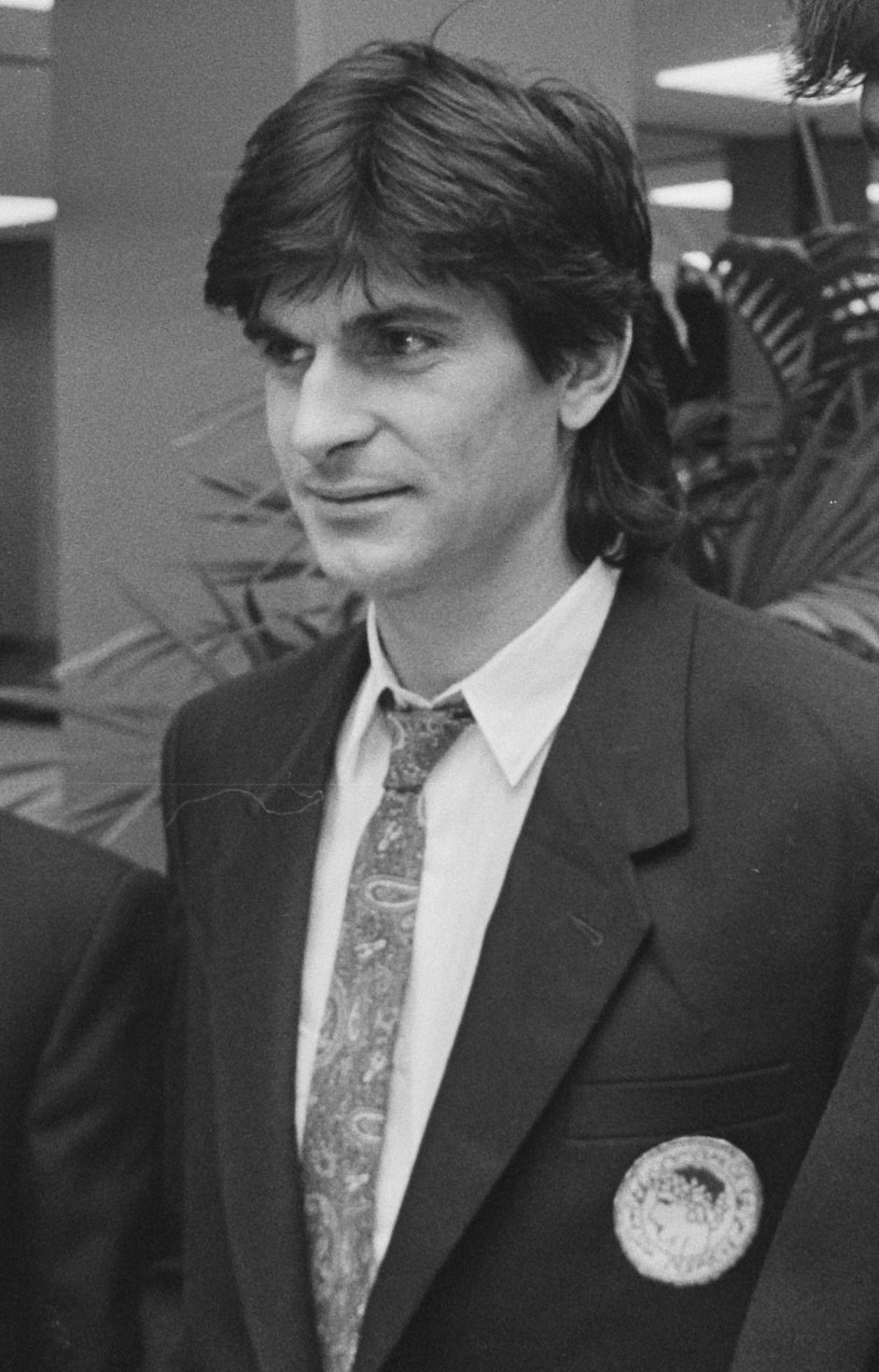
- Kostikos in 1986

Personal information
- Full name: Georgios Kostikos
- Date of birth: 26 April 1958 (age 68)
- Place of birth: Tashkent, Uzbek SSR, Soviet Union
- Height: 1.85 m (6 ft 1 in)
- Position: Striker

Team information
- Current team: PAOK (Chief Scout)

Youth career
- 1973–1975: Pierikos

Senior career*
Years	Team	Apps	(Gls)
1975–1977	Pierikos	51	(13)
1977–1986	PAOK	233	(78)
1986–1987	Olympiacos	20	(5)
1987–1988	Diagoras	19	(6)
Total		323	(102)

International career
1977–1984	Greece	35	(3)

Managerial career
- 1997–1998: Pierikos
- 1998–1999: Levadiakos
- 1999–2000: Kozani
- 2000: Nafpaktiakos Asteras
- 2001: Kozani
- 2001–2002: Ethnikos Piraeus
- 2002–2004: Greece U19
- 2005–2006: PAOK
- 2006: Levadiakos
- 2007: Nea Salamis
- 2008: Apollon Kalamarias
- 2009: Veria
- 2012–: PAOK (Chief Scout)
- * Club domestic league appearances and goals

Georgios Kostikos (Greek: Γεώργιος Κωστίκος; born 26 April 1958) is a Greek former international footballer who played as a striker.

== Club career ==
Kostikos made his Greek League debut with Pierikos in 1975 and two years later he was acquired by PAOK. He played for PAOK from 1977 to 1986, winning the 1985 league title and netting 97 goals in 294 appearances in all competitions. In 1986, he moved to rivals Olympiacos and won the 1987 league title. The next year, he finished his career at Diagoras, being only 30 years old.

== International career ==
Kostikos had 35 caps and scored three goals for the Greece national team from 1977 to 1984. He also participated in the UEFA Euro 1980 that was held in Italy.

== Managerial career ==
After his retirement from active football, he pursued a managerial career, having worked at Pierikos, Levadiakos, Kozani, Ethnikos Piraeus and the Greece national U19 team, among others. In 2006, after the dismissal of PAOK manager, Nikos Karageorgiou, Kostikos took over as a caretaker. After Kostikos successfully led PAOK to the 2005–06 UEFA Cup Group stage, PAOK president Giannis Goumenos named him as the team's permanent manager. In 2007, Kostikos coached Nea Salamina of Famagusta in Cyprus. Since 2012, Kostikos is one of PAOK chief scouts.

== Personal life ==
His parents were refugees of the Greek Civil War. His brother Alekos (1953–1991) was a goalkeeper and died in a car accident. His son Giorgos Kostikos plays as a midfielder.

== Career statistics ==
=== Club career ===
Appearances and goals by club, season and competition
Club	Season	League			Cup		Continental		Total	
Club	Season	Division	Apps	Goals	Apps	Goals	Apps	Goals	Apps	Goals
Pierikos	1973–74	Beta Ethniki					–			
Pierikos	1974–75	Beta Ethniki					–			
Pierikos	1975–76	Alpha Ethniki	17	3			–			
Pierikos	1976–77	Alpha Ethniki	34	10			–			
Pierikos	Total		51	13			–			
PAOK	1977–78	Alpha Ethniki	25	0	3	2	4	0	32	2
PAOK	1978–79	Alpha Ethniki	30	10	2	0	2	0	34	10
PAOK	1979–80	Alpha Ethniki	29	16	6	2	–		35	18
PAOK	1980–81	Alpha Ethniki	24	9	8	2	–		32	11
PAOK	1981–82	Alpha Ethniki	34	18	7	2	2	2	43	22
PAOK	1982–83	Alpha Ethniki	32	5	6	3	4	1	42	9
PAOK	1983–84	Alpha Ethniki	27	7	5	2	4	1	36	10
PAOK	1984–85	Alpha Ethniki	18	8	5	2	–		23	10
PAOK	1985–86	Alpha Ethniki	14	5	2	0	1	0	17	5
PAOK	Total		233	78	44	15	17	4	294	97
Olympiacos	1986–87	Alpha Ethniki	15	5	2	0	4	0	21	5
Olympiacos	1987–88 (i)	Alpha Ethniki	5	0	0	0	1	1	6	1
Olympiacos	Total		20	5	2	0	5	1	27	6
Diagoras	1987–88 (ii)	Alpha Ethniki	19	6			–			
Career total			323	102			22	5		

Source: RSSSF

=== International career ===
National team	Year	Caps	Goals
Greece
Greece	1977	1	0
Greece	1979	2	0
Greece	1980	9	0
Greece	1981	8	2
Greece	1982	8	0
Greece	1983	5	1
Greece	1984	2	0
Total		35	3

List of international goals scored by Giorgos Kostikos
No.	Date	Venue	Opponent	Score	Result	Competition
1	28 January 1981	Charilaou Stadium, Thessaloniki	Luxembourg	2–0	2–0	1982 FIFA World Cup qualification
2	29 April 1981	Stadion Poljud, Split	Yugoslavia	1–5	1–5	1982 FIFA World Cup qualification
3	15 May 1983	Népstadion, Budapest	Hungary	2–1	3–2	UEFA Euro 1984 qualifying

== Honours ==
Pierikos

- Beta Ethniki: 1974–75

PAOK

- Alpha Ethniki: 1984–85

Olympiacos

- Alpha Ethniki: 1986–87
- Greek Super Cup: 1987
