= Dimitrios Spentzopoulos =

Greek footballer

Dimitrios Spentzopoulos (Greek: Δημήτριος Σπεντζόπουλος) (born 8 March 1950), is a former Greek footballer (striker) born in Patras. He was a member of the great Panachaiki football team that impressed Greece in the seventies and participated in the 1974 UEFA Cup.

Spentzopoulos was transferred at the end of the 1972–73 season to Panachaiki from Kalamata, and his prolific scoring helped the Great lady of Peloponnesus to remain a significant power in the Greek First Division. He led the league in goal-scoring with 15 goals during the 1977–78 season.

== Statistics ==
Dimitris Spentzopoulos scored 73 goals in the Greek First Division, 67 for Panachaiki and 6 for Kalamata.
