= Theodoros Pallas =

Greek footballer (1949–2025)

Personal information
- Date of birth: 30 November 1949
- Place of birth: Thessaloniki, Greece
- Date of death: 9 August 2025 (aged 75)
- Place of death: Athens, Greece
- Position: Left-back

Youth career
- 1962–1966: Aris

Senior career*
Years	Team	Apps	(Gls)
1966–1980	Aris	368	(30)
1980–1982	Olympiacos	40	(0)
Total		408	(30)

International career
1971–1978	Greece	31	(0)
- * Club domestic league appearances and goals

Theodoros Pallas (Greek: Θεόδωρος Πάλλας; 30 November 1949 – 9 August 2025) was a Greek footballer who played as a left-back for Aris Thessaloniki from 1966 to 1980. He followed Dinos Kouis, on the all-time league appearances list for Aris, having 368 during his career. In 1981, Pallas played for Olympiacos where he retired after two seasons. He was also a member of the Greece national team in the 1970s having 31 appearances. He died on 9 August 2025, at the age of 75.
