= Neto Guerino =

Brazilian footballer

Guerino Neto
Personal information
- Full name: Guerino Minervino Neto
- Date of birth: 24 March 1950 (age 76)
- Place of birth: São Paulo, Brazil
- Height: 1.82 m (6 ft 0 in)
- Position: Striker

Senior career*
Years	Team	Apps	(Gls)
1968–1972	Nacional de Uberaba	?	(?)
1972–1973	Atlético Mineiro	30	(1)
1973–1974	Nacional	?	(9)
1974–1983	PAOK	233	(66)
1983–1985	Apollon Kalamarias	40	(8)
Total		303	(84)

Managerial career
- 1993: Veria
- * Club domestic league appearances and goals

Guerino Minervino Neto (born 24 March 1950), commonly known as Neto Guerino, is a Brazilian former footballer who played as a striker.

== Career ==
In the early 1970s, Guerino played for Atlético Mineiro and Nacional in the Campeonato Brasileiro, before moving abroad to play in Greece.

In 1974, he joined PAOK, being a key member of the squad that won the 1976 league title, scoring 11 goals in 30 matches. On 2 May 1976, PAOK prevailed 1–0 over title contenders AEK Athens with Guerino scoring the winner at the 89th minute, giving the Double-Headed Eagle of the North a four-point lead (point system 2–1–0) that almost clinched the title. The photo of Guerino's celebration, hanging on the railings of Toumba Stadium's Gate 4, has become iconic, as it depicts the moment that the team sealed its first ever league title and the outburst of PAOK fans. Regarded as one of the best foreign players in club's history, Guerino wore the No 11 white-black jersey for over nine years, netting 66 goals in 233 league appearances.

In December 1983, he moved to Apollon Kalamarias and played for two years before retiring.

Guerino is one of the co-founders of the Arsakli football academy, founded in 2015, in Panorama, Thessaloniki alongside Giorgos Koudas, Kostas Orfanos, Vasilis Vasilakos, Koulis Apostolidis and others.

== Career statistics ==
Neto Guerino in the Greek Championship
Club	Division	Season	Apps	Goals
PAOK	Alpha Ethniki	1974–75	15	8
PAOK	Alpha Ethniki	1975–76	30	11
PAOK	Alpha Ethniki	1976–77	30	13
PAOK	Alpha Ethniki	1977–78	24	4
PAOK	Alpha Ethniki	1978–79	29	15
PAOK	Alpha Ethniki	1979–80	31	8
PAOK	Alpha Ethniki	1980–81	26	2
PAOK	Alpha Ethniki	1981–82	22	2
PAOK	Alpha Ethniki	1982–83	24	3
PAOK	Alpha Ethniki	1983–84 (i)	2	0
PAOK	Total		233	66
Apollon Kalamarias	Alpha Ethniki	1983–84 (ii)	17	4
Apollon Kalamarias	Alpha Ethniki	1984–85	22	4
Apollon Kalamarias	Alpha Ethniki	1985–86 (i)	1	0
Apollon Kalamarias	Total		40	8
Career total			273	74

Source: RSSSF

== Honours ==
PAOK

- Alpha Ethniki: 1975–76

Individual

- Foreign player with most goals for PAOK: 80 goals
- Foreign player with most league goals for PAOK: 66 goals

== Bibliography ==
- Bliatkas, Kostas (2005). Γιώργος Κούδας, της ζωής μου το παιχνίδι [Giorgos Koudas, the game of my life] (in Greek). Greece: Ianos Publications. ISBN 978-960-7827-35-7.
- Pappous, Michalis (2019). Ο ΠΑΟΚ του '70 [The PAOK of the '70s] (in Greek). Greece: University Studio Press. ISBN 978-960-12-2421-3.
