= Ioannis Damanakis =

Greek footballer

Giannis Damanakis
Personal information
- Full name: Ioannis Damanakis
- Date of birth: 2 October 1952 (age 74)
- Place of birth: Chania, Crete, Greece
- Position: Defensive midfielder

Youth career
- 1968–1970: AO Chania

Senior career*
Years	Team	Apps	(Gls)
1970–1976	AO Chania	?	(?)
1976–1985	PAOK	242	(16)
1985–1986	Makedonikos	?	(?)
1986–1989	E.A.R	?	(?)

International career^{‡}
1977–1983	Greece	24	(1)
- * Club domestic league appearances and goals as of 1985 ‡ National team caps and goals as of 1985

Ioannis Damanakis (Greek: Ιωάννης Δαμανάκης; born 2 October 1952) is a Greek former international footballer who played as a defensive midfielder.

== Career ==
=== Club career ===
Damanakis began his career at AO Chania before transferring to PAOK in 1976. He was a personal choice of former PAOK FC president Giorgos Pantelakis. A tireless defensive midfielder who gave his all on the football pitch, the Cretan quickly became a first-team regular and also a fan favorite. He made 242 league appearances scoring 16 goals with the White-blacks of the North. He participated in 5 Greek Cup finals and won the 1985 league title. After 9 years with PAOK, he played one season for Makedonikos and ended his career at E.A.R.

=== International career ===
Damanakis had 24 caps for the Greece national team between 1977 and 1983, scoring 1 goal. He was a member of the squad that participated in the UEFA Euro 1980.

National team	Year	Caps	Goals
Greece
Greece	1977	2	0
Greece	1978	7	0
Greece	1979	4	0
Greece	1980	5	1
Greece	1981	4	0
Greece	1982	1	0
Greece	1983	1	0
Total		24	1

International goal scored by Giannis Damanakis
No.	Date	Venue	Opponent	Score	Result	Competition
1	11 November 1980	Leoforos Alexandras Stadium, Athens	Australia	1–1	3–3	Friendly

== Honours ==
PAOK

- Alpha Ethniki: 1984–85
