= PAOK FC Sport Center =

PAOK sport center
- Interactive map of PAOK sport center
- Location: Nea Mesimvria; Thessaloniki regional unit
- Coordinates: 40°46′01″N 22°45′15″E
- Owner: PAOK FC
- Type: Sports training facility
- Surface: Grass pitches (6); Synthetic turf (1)

Construction
- Built: 2011
- Expanded: 2016

Tenants
- PAOK FC; PAOK Academy

PAOK Sports Center (also known as Nea Mesimvria sports center) is the training ground and academy headquarters of Greek football club PAOK FC, located in Nea Mesimvria, Chalkidona, Thessaloniki regional unit, Greece. It is the first training center owned by the club. Before that, PAOK first team and the academies were renting several training centers in Thessaloniki. Construction on the Nea Mesimvria area began in February 2009, and was opened in September 2011 where the first coaching session took place. Since then, there have been major additions at the center, including a bigger medical centre, larger physiotherapy room, diagnostic ultrasound, hyperbaric chamber for recovery, cryotherapy room, pool and hydrotherapy room.

== Overview ==
The idea of a training center, which would belong to the club existed for many years. Under the presidency of Theodoros Zagorakis the dream became a reality. In June 2008 it was decided to construct PAOK's new sports centre at Nea Mesimvria, a suburb of the city of Thessaloniki. The centre covers an area of 70 stremma (17,3 acres). There are seven pitches, one of them with artificial turf. Six of them have floodlights. Initially, the training center was incomplete, mainly on medical and technical issues of player rehabilitation. Today is a modern and integrated training center, which includes:

- The central building stages the dressing rooms, the gym and the coach's office.
- The second building houses the dressing rooms of the youth sections.
- There are also auxiliary buildings for the senior team, the recreation building, the guard-house, restaurant, bar, indoor pool, sauna, spa pool, recreation hall, play rooms, storage areas and conference room.
- There is also a medical centre, physiotherapy room, diagnostic ultrasound, hyperbaric chamber, cryotherapy room, hydrotherapy room, underwater treadmills.
- Six floodlit football fields with natural grass turf, and 1 football field with synthetic turf.

=== New Training Center Thermi ===
On 19 January 2024, a blessing of the land where the club's new training center will be built took place. The newly acquired plot of land is located on the 8th road of the Tagarades farmland in the Thermi municipality.

== See also ==
- Toumba Stadium
- PAOK Academy
