= Zisis Chatzistravos =

Greek footballer (born 1999)

Personal information
- Date of birth: 16 December 1999 (age 26)
- Place of birth: Nigrita, Serres, Greece
- Height: 1.70 m (5 ft 7 in)
- Positions: Attacking midfielder; winger

Team information
- Current team: Panionios
- Number: 20

Youth career
- 2009–2013: Panserraikos
- 2013–2019: PAOK

Senior career*
Years	Team	Apps	(Gls)
2019–2023	PAOK	0	(0)
2019–2020	→ Karaiskakis (loan)	20	(9)
2020–2021	→ Lamia (loan)	8	(0)
2021–2023	PAOK B	46	(9)
2023–2025	Panserraikos	49	(5)
2025–2026	AEL	23	(0)
2026–	Panionios	3	(0)

International career
2017	Greece U18	4	(0)
2018	Greece U19	1	(0)
- * Club domestic league appearances and goals as of 19 September 2026

Zisis Chatzistravos (Greek: Ζήσης Χατζηστραβός; born 16 December 1999) is a Greek professional footballer who plays as an attacking midfielder for Super League 2 club Panionios.

== Career ==
=== Early career ===
Chatzistavros joined PAOK in 2013, coming from Serres and Panserraikos. He was a member of the Under-17 team, the Under-19 title-winning teams, and a youth international. He is an attacking midfielder who can play on both sides of the attack, as well as through the center. He is also a TEFAA student at the Democritus University of Thrace. He was loaned to Karaiskakis and Lamia, and is now returning to where he started.

== Personal life ==
Chatzistavros hails from Nigrita, Serres.

== Career statistics ==
As of 15 August 2024

Club	Season	League			Cup		Continental		Other		Total	
Club	Season	Division	Apps	Goals	Apps	Goals	Apps	Goals	Apps	Goals	Apps	Goals
Karaiskakis (loan)	2019–20	Superleague Greece 2	20	9	1	0	—		—		21	9
Lamia (loan)	2020–21	Superleague Greece	8	0	1	0	—		—		9	0
PAOK B	2021–22	Superleague Greece 2	22	2	—		—		—		22	2
PAOK B	2022–23	Superleague Greece 2	24	7	—		—		—		24	7
PAOK B	Total		46	9	—		—		—		46	9
Panserraikos	2023–24	Superleague Greece	25	3	2	0	—		—		27	3
Panserraikos	2024–25	Superleague Greece	24	2	2	0	—		—		26	2
Panserraikos	Total		49	5	4	0	—		—		53	5
Career total			123	23	6	0	0	0	0	0	129	23
