= PAOK FC =

Greek association football club

PAOK
- Full name: Πανθεσσαλονίκειος Αθλητικός Όμιλος Κωνσταντινουπολιτών
- Nicknames: Δικέφαλος; Dikefalos (Double-Headed Eagle); Ασπρόμαυροι; Asprómavri (White-Blacks)
- Short name: PAOK
- Founded: 20 April 1926; 100 years ago
- Ground: Toumba Stadium
- Capacity: 28,703 (all-seater)
- Owner: Dimera Group Limited Ltd
- President: Ivan Savvidis
- Head coach: Alessio Lisci
- League: Super League Greece
- 2025–26: Super League Greece, 3rd of 14
- Website: paokfc.gr
Home colours	Away colours	Third colours

PAOK FC (Greek: ΠΑΕ ΠΑΟΚ, ['pa.ok]) is a professional football club based in Thessaloniki, Macedonia, Greece. The club is commonly known internationally as PAOK Thessaloniki or PAOK Salonica, while in Greece it is referred to simply as PAOK. PAOK are one of the top domestic clubs and the most successful and widely supported in Northern Greece.

Established on 20 April 1926 by Greek refugees who fled to Thessaloniki from Constantinople in the wake of the Greco-Turkish War (1919–1922), they play their home games at Toumba Stadium, a 29,000 seating capacity football ground. Their name, along with the club's emblem, the Byzantine-style double-headed eagle with retracted wings, honours the memory of the people and places (mostly from the city of Constantinople) that once belonged to the Eastern Roman Empire. PAOK currently plays in the top-flight Super League, which they have won four times (in 1976, 1985, 2019 and 2024). They are eight-time winners of the Greek Cup (in 1972, 1974, 2001, 2003, 2017, 2018, 2019 and 2021). The club is one of the three which have never been relegated from the top national division and the only team in Greece that have won the Double (in 2019) going unbeaten (26–4–0 record) in a national round-robin league tournament (league format since 1959).

The team has appeared several times in the UEFA Europa League, but has yet to reach the group stage of the UEFA Champions League. PAOK have reached the quarter-finals of a European competition three times; once in the 1973–74 European Cup Winners' Cup and twice in the UEFA Conference League, in the 2021–22 and 2023–24 seasons. PAOK is the only Greek team that has more wins than losses in their European record (99 wins, 68 draws and 87 defeats, as of August 2025) and the 0–7 away UEFA Cup win over Locomotive Tbilisi on 16 September 1999 is the largest ever achieved by a Greek football club in all European competitions.

== History ==
=== Foundation and early years (1926–1939) ===
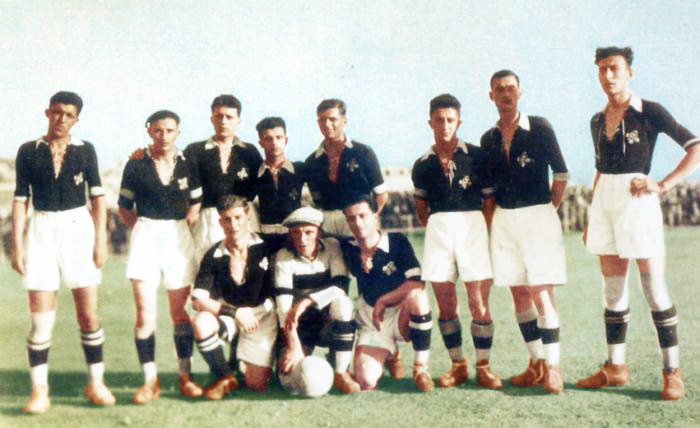
PAOK in 1926

PAOK FC is the oldest department of the major multi-sport club AC P.A.O.K., which is closely linked with Hermes Sports Club, that was formed in 1875 by the Greek community of Pera, a district of Istanbul (Constantinople). The football club was founded in April 1926 after a dispute with Enosis Konstantinoupoliton Thessalonikis (E.K. Th.), a social and political organisation, by Constantinopolitans who fled to Thessaloniki after the Greek defeat in the Greco-Turkish War. PAOK's policy was to be open to every citizen of Thessaloniki, leading to a minor rivalry with AEK Thessaloniki, the other Constantinopolitan club of the city, from which PAOK had split prior to its foundation and was attended exclusively by refugees.

PAOK played its first friendly match on 4 May 1926 at the stadium of Thermaikos, defeating Megas Alexandros Thessaloniki 2–1, coached by Kostas Andreadis, who spent five years on the team's bench without demanding payment. The first professional contract was signed by the club in September 1928 for French footballer Raymond Etienne of Jewish descent from Pera Club (the club that PAOK's founding members played in), which ignited further controversy between the two refugee clubs. In March 1929, AEK Thessaloniki was disbanded as a sports club and their members joined PAOK. PAOK thereupon changed its emblem, adopting the Double-headed eagle, as a symbol of the club's Constantinopolitan heritage. PAOK also got possession of AEK Thessaloniki's facilities located around Syntrivani and settled there, becoming the sole refugee club in the city.

Albeit PAOK's first years in existence were marred by strife and controversy with the Macedonia Football Clubs Association and the Hellenic Football Federation, the team's ascension led to its debut in the 1930–31 Panhellenic Championship, becoming a mainstay at the national stage, with the construction of the Syntrivani Stadium being completed in 1932. The team would win its first regional title, the Macedonia Championship, in 1937, beginning a period of dominance. PAOK would reach a Greek Cup final in 1939 and the two-legged final of the Panhellenic Championship in 1940, losing both times to AEK Athens. However, the team's success would be cut short by the Greco–Italian War, where the team was dismembered, with two players dying on duty.

=== Regional league dominance and youth academy (1946–1959) ===
After World War II, in the early 1950s, a state-of-the-art youth academy named PAOK Academy was created by the Austrian manager Wilhelm (Willy) Sevcik, who played for the club in the 1930s. The academy was known as the "chicos of Willi". From the newly founded academy sprang some great football players of the period, such as Leandros Symeonidis, Giannelos Margaritis and Giorgos Havanidis.

In 1948, PAOK won their second Macedonia Championship, and then participated in the final phase of the Panhellenic Championship where they were ranked third. PAOK footballers dedicated the title to the memory of team captain, Thrasyvoulos Panidis, who had lost his life (18 February 1948) in the Greek Civil War a few days prior. In 1950, they became champions of Macedonia for a third time, and the following year (1950–51), the team reached their second Cup final, but lost to Olympiacos.

After a busy transfer period in 1953, PAOK's offensive play was significantly strengthened with an effective front three, consisting of Kouiroukidis, Papadakis and Yientzis and the club dominated the Macedonian championship for the rest of the decade, with four consecutive titles from 1954 to 1957, going unbeaten from 1954 to 1956, under the management of Nikos Pangalos, Erman Hoffman and Walter Pfeiffer, albeit results in the Panhellenic Championship were more mixed. The team also reached a third Cup final in 1955, losing to Panathinaikos. The concluding seasons of the decade were less successful, but the team's performance in the 1958–59 Macedonia Championship secured a spot in the newly found nationwide Alpha Ethniki, which replaced the region–based Panhellenic Championship.

=== Alpha Ethniki, domestic and international success, professionalism (1959–1989) ===
Having moved to the newly built and crowdfunded Toumba Stadium in September 1959, PAOK's first years in the nationwide division were unassuming, finishing no higher than sixth between 1960 and 1966, except for a fourth-place finish in 1963. Under the captaincy of Leandros Symeonidis the club slowly built a solid foundation through its youth academy, with emerging youngsters such as Giorgos Koudas and Stavros Sarafis. In this period, PAOK became a frequent guest in the Inter-Cities Fairs Cup and significantly increased its attacking form under Ivor Powell and Jane Janevski. In 1968, Koudas' controversial transfer from PAOK to Olympiacos was annulled, in a string of incidents that started a heated rivalry between the two teams.

The 1970s was a successful period for the club, with scouting on behalf of president Giorgos Pantelakis building a strong team, including Sarafis, Terzanidis, Iosifidis, Gounaris, Paridis, Aslanidis, Apostolidis, Fountoukidis, Kermanidis, Anastasiadis, Furtula, Guerino and captained by Koudas. From 1970 to 1974, PAOK reached five consecutive Cup finals, defeating Panathinaikos in 1972 and Olympiacos on penalties in 1974, under the management of Englishman Les Shannon. The club came close to its first nationwide league title in the 1972–73 season, finishing runners–up and Cup finalists in a controversial manner to Olympiacos. It would eventually clinch its first league title in 1976, under the management of former Hungarian Golden Team international Gyula Lóránt. Afterward, the club mounted a 62-game undefeated streak at home from 1976 to 1980.

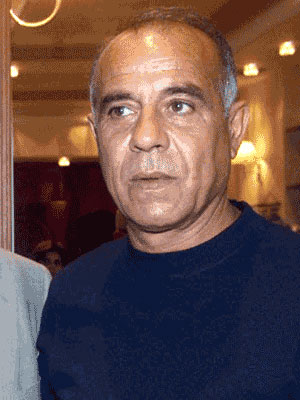
Giorgos Koudas, the most capped PAOK player with 607 games

In European competitions, the club achieved major wins against clubs like Lyon in 1973 and Barcelona in 1975, reaching the quarter-finals of the European Cup Winners' Cup in 1974, eventually being knocked out by AC Milan. It then lost the 1977 and 1978 Cup finals and failed to defend the title in controversial fashion in 1977, with PAOK coming at odds with the Hellenic Football Federation. Further complications ensued after the 1978 Thessaloniki earthquake, which damaged Toumba Stadium and eventually led to its Gate 8 collapsing in February 1980.

In the summer of 1979, football in Greece became fully professional, with PAOK restructuring into a privately owned football limited company, with major stockholder Giorgos Pantelakis as the club's president. With the rise of PAOK's ultras group Gate 4, PAOK would become entangled in ownership controversies that would go on via various means for over two decades. As the advent of hooliganism rose dramatically in Greece, PAOK would become infamous for various incidents, starting with a loss against Panathinaikos at Toumba in 1980.

The early 1980s were trophyless for PAOK, with the club being a consistent challenger for silverware domestically, despite being struck by tragedy when Gyula Lóránt died of a heart attack in a league match against Olympiacos in 1981. Inspired by promising new players, such as Christos Dimopoulos, the club reached two Cup finals, in 1981 and 1983, ultimately losing both to Olympiacos and AEK Athens respectively, while also losing in Europe to Eintracht Frankfurt and Bayern Munich, both on penalties. Koudas and Furtula retired from football in the summer of 1984.

In the 1984–85 season, under Austrian manager Walter Skocik and leading players, such as Skartados, Alavantas, Singas, Kostikos and Paprica, PAOK clinched their second league title, while falling short of the Cup in the final against AEL. Captain Kostas Iosifidis retired at the end of the season and the rest of the 1980s were less fruitful for the club. In the 1987–88 season, the club fall short of the league title amidst increasing board controversies.

=== Financial issues, ownership changes, continental success (1989–2012) ===
In 1989, Thomas Voulinos became the club's president, initiating a rise in form entering the 1990s, with players such as Magdy Tolba and academy signing Giorgos Toursounidis. The club slumped to a third place in the 1990 title race and entered a period of on and off–pitch instability, starting with Voulinos protesting on the pitch in a match against Panathinaikos in 1990. After losing in the double–legged Cup final in 1992 to Olympiacos, Gate 4 and PAOK's presidency became increasingly at odds, resulting in boycotts from the club's fans and a sharp decrease in attendances at the insistence of Gate 4 throughout the decade.

In Europe, the club had notable encounters in the UEFA Cup with Sevilla, losing on penalties and K.V. Mechelen, defeating them away from home, but increasing discontent between Gate 4 and Voulinos resulted in heavy rioting at a UEFA Cup home game against Paris Saint-Germain in October 1992, resulting in a two-season ban from European competitions, later reduced to one year. With younger players such as Theodoros Zagorakis, the team achieved a more successful 1994–95 season under Dutchman Arie Haan. The following season, the club was threatened with its first relegation, ultimately finishing four points clear with a points deduction, following heavy rioting and arson against Thomas Voulinos after a 1–3 loss to AEK Athens in November 1995.

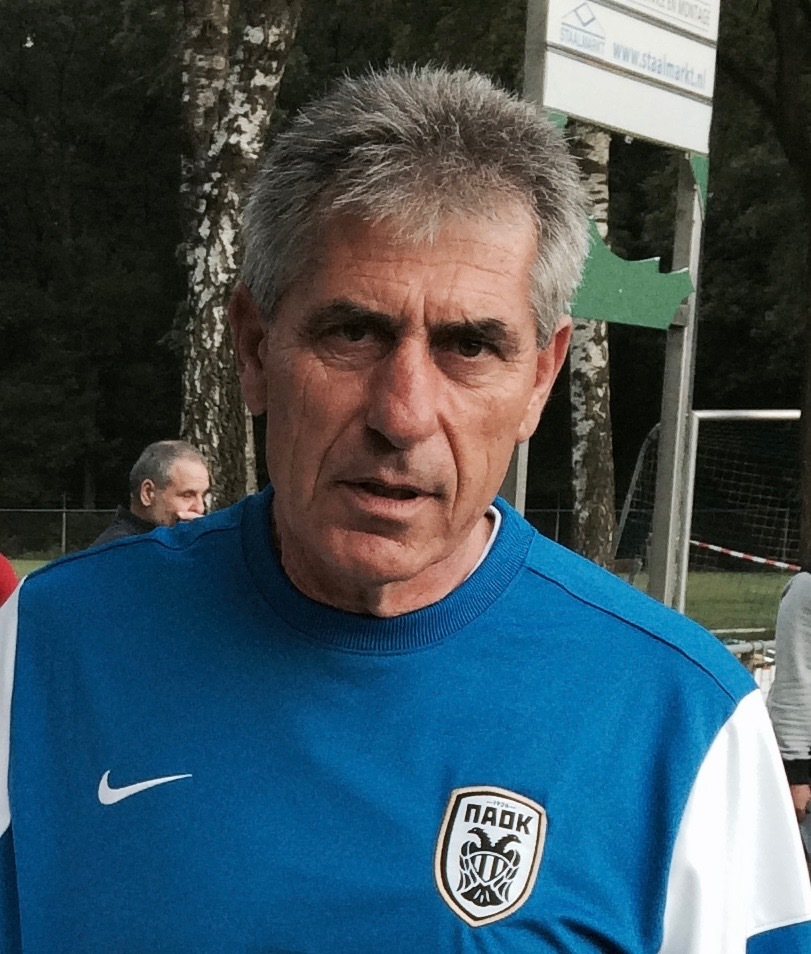
Angelos Anastasiadis won the Cup both as a player (1974) and manager (2003)

In 1996, Thomas Voulinos handed over a debt-free PAOK to Giorgos Batatoudis. Numerous successful players such as Zisis Vryzas, Spyros Marangos, free kick specialist Kostas Frantzeskos, Percy Olivares and Joe Nagbe were signed under the new administration. Under former player Angelos Anastasiadis, after a five-year absence from European competitions, PAOK qualified for the UEFA Cup. The club's reappearance at European level was marked by a victory and qualification over eventual double winners Arsenal. Under Dušan Bajević, PAOK won the domestic Cup in 2001, defeating Olympiacos 4–2 in the final to claim the club's first trophy in 16 years. Bajević departed in 2002, to be replaced by Angelos Anastasiadis, who led PAOK to a 1–0 defeat of local rivals Aris in the 2003 Cup final, becoming the first former player to win a trophy as manager. Batatoudis's shares were transferred, he was removed from the presidency following the Cup win and was succeeded by Giannis Goumenos following a rise in the club's debt.

This period would be overshadowed by the untimely death of 21 year old player Panagiotis Katsouris in February 1998 and the Vale of Tempe disaster in 1999, which claimed the lives of six PAOK fans following an away match against Panathinaikos. Ceremonies take place every year in remembrance of the tragedies, with Katsouris' jersey number (No. 17) being permanently retired and a bust being erected in his memory in 2000.

After a successful 2003–04 season, in which the club qualified for the UEFA Champions League third qualifying round for the first time, the club failed to qualify to the group stage while fielding Liasos Louka, who was an ineligible player. The club's financial situation worsened, as managerial and boardroom crisis culminated in the emergence of the club's poor financial position; players declared they had been unpaid for months, which led to a decision by UEFA to ban the club from European competitions, bringing the club close to dissolution. The organized supporters' groups launched an all-out war, occupying the club's offices during the summer of 2006. After possible takeover bids failed and embezzlement allegations arose, especially after the transfer of Dimitris Salpingidis to Panathinaikos, Goumenos resigned in November 2006, with a temporary administration assuming control, as debt had tripled in Goumenos' three year presidency.

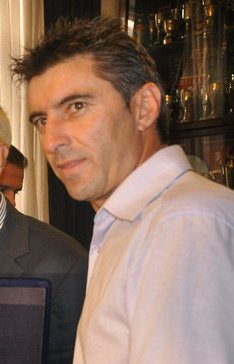
Theodoros Zagorakis, captain and former president of PAOK FC

In June 2007, former player and captain Theodoros Zagorakis retired and assumed the presidency of the club. PAOK's finances gradually improved thanks to new sponsorship deals and the rising attendance from the club's fans, which contributed to the completion of the PAOK FC Sport Center in 2009. He was followed by Zisis Vryzas, who retired in 2008 to become director of football.

In his first season, the early replacement of Georgios Paraschos by Fernando Santos did little to prevent a ninth-place finish in the league. The next season was more successful, with new signings such as club favourites Vieirinha, Pablo Contreras and Pablo García, qualifying for European football for the first time since 2005. After a successful 2009–10 season, where the team narrowly missed out on the league title and qualified for the Champions League qualifying round, Santos left the club, with former player Pavlos Dermitzakis leading the club to qualification in the rebranded UEFA Europa League against Fenerbahçe, before being sacked in October. Under Makis Chavos, PAOK reached the knockout stages before being eliminated by CSKA Moscow. The next season, under Romanian László Bölöni, was highlighted by a 1–2 win against Tottenham Hotspur at White Hart Lane. PAOK finished top of its Europa League group, ultimately being defeated in the next round by Udinese. In January 2012, Zagorakis resigned from the club's presidency and was replaced by director Zisis Vryzas, in a transitional effort brought forth by increasing fan discontent following the sale of Vieirinha to VfL Wolfsburg.

=== The Ivan Savvidis era (2012–present) ===
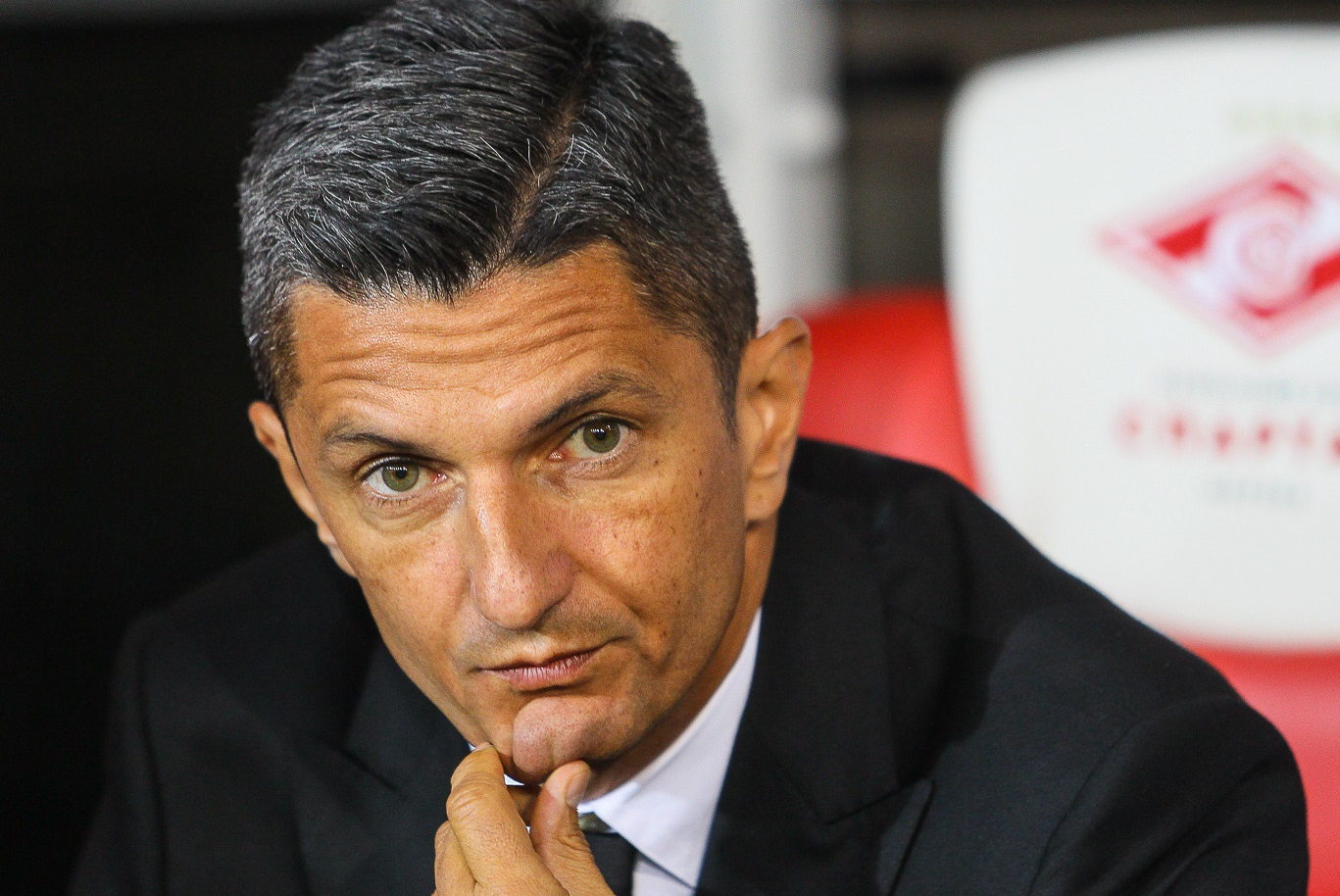
Răzvan Lucescu, most successful PAOK manager

On 10 August 2012, Ivan Savvidis acquired PAOK ownership by depositing a fee of €9,951,000 and thus becoming the major shareholder of the club. Following the takeover, the club sought to eliminate its debts, successfully doing so over the course of three years, a fee of over 10 million euros, becoming the first Greek sports club to fully repay its loans.

The first years under the new presidency were ambitious but lackluster, with the club remaining trophyless after losing the domestic Cup final in 2014 to Panathinaikos and failing to third place after leading the table at Christmas the following season, under returning Angelos Anastasiadis. Whilst European form was more positive, highlighted by a surprise 1–0 away win over Borussia Dortmund at Signal Iduna Park, domestic form was underwhelming, with Igor Tudor being replaced in March 2016 by youth-team coach and former player Vladimir Ivić, who led the team to a return in the Champions League third qualifying round. The next season saw the club's successful return to the Europa League knockouts and a controversial 2–1 win over AEK Athens in the Cup final, which was maligned by off pitch incidents that resulted in a points deduction for the club.

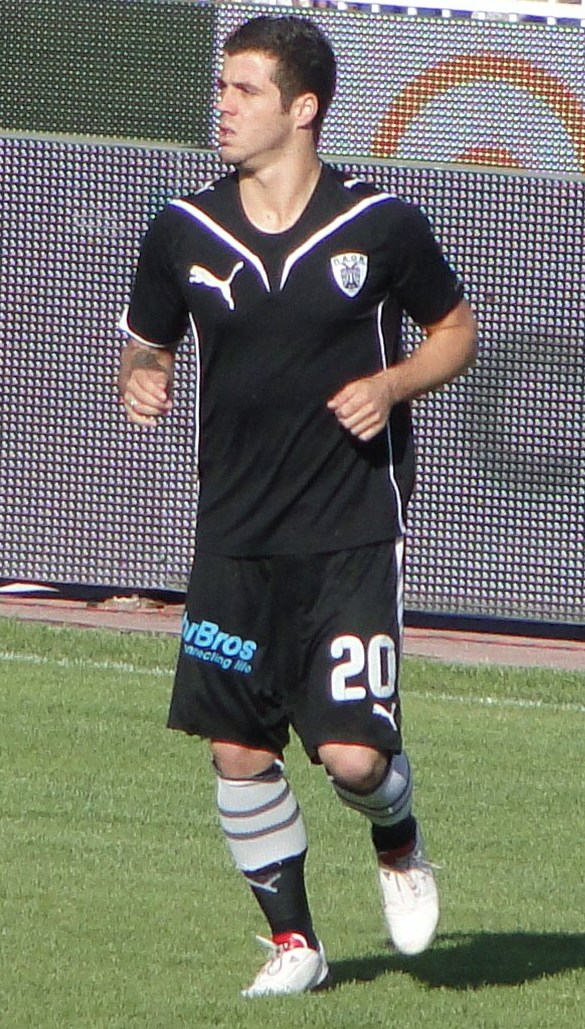
Vieirinha, PAOK most decorated player

After Ivić departed in the summer of 2017, he was briefly succeeded by Aleksandar Stanojević, who was let go after two Europa League matches and was succeeded by Răzvan Lucescu. Captained by returning player Vieirinha, PAOK came second in the 2017–18 campaign. It became a highly controversial season, most notably for the home league matches against Olympiacos and AEK Athens which were both interrupted and lost by court decision. A few months later, PAOK claimed its second consecutive domestic Cup, beating AEK Athens 2–0 in the final held at the Olympic Stadium of Athens (AEK home ground at the time). During the post-game press conference, manager Lucescu and captain Vieirinha (final MVP) both stated that the 2018 league title was stolen from PAOK.

Inspired by initial European success, the 2018–19 season became the most successful in the club's history, claiming PAOK's third league title and finishing undefeated, becoming only the second Greek team to do so after Panathinaikos in the 1963–64 season. PAOK also claimed their third consecutive Greek Cup, beating AEK Athens in the final for the third year in a row to seal the club's first double. Lucescu departed shortly after, and his successor Abel Ferreira brought the club close to Champions League qualification, defeating Benfica and Beşiktaş before being elinimated by Krasnodar. Former player and captain Pablo García succeeded him in October 2020, leading the club to an eighth Greek Cup, defeating Olympiacos 2–1 in the final, in May 2021. Lucescu would return to the managerial post shortly after, with talented emerging players such as Giannis Konstantelias and Konstantinos Koulierakis leading the club to the quarter-finals in the newly found UEFA Europa Conference League in 2022, a feat the club would repeat in 2024, and reaching successive Cup finals, losing to Panathinaikos and AEK Athens in 2022 and 2023 respectively.

In 2023–24 season, PAOK after finishing first in the regular season, managed to remain on top after the conclusion of the play-offs winning their fourth Greek Championship on a remarkable fashion. PAOK defeated all their major rivals (AEK Athens, Olympiacos, Panathinaikos and Aris) in the last four matches, winning against the three league contenders from Athens at home and clinching the title with a 1–2 away victory over city rivals, Aris at Kleanthis Vikelidis Stadium on 19 May 2024.

In January 2026, Christos Zafeiris joined PAOK after transferring over from Slavia Prague.

== Crest and colours ==
=== Crest ===
The first emblem of PAOK depicted a four-leaf clover and a horseshoe. The leaves were green and above them were the initials of the word "PAOK". Kostas Koemtzopoulos, one of PAOK's founding members, came up with this idea, inspired by his favourite brand of cigarettes.

On 20 March 1929, Enosis Konstantinoupoliton Thessalonikis (A.E.K.) was dissolved and absorbed by PAOK and a mournful version of the double-headed eagle with the wings closed instead of stretched, indicating the grief for the lost homelands, was adopted as the club's new emblem.

On 11 June 2013, under the presidency of Ivan Savvidis, a golden outline was added to the crest, as a symbol of the club's Byzantine heritage.

During the 2018–19 season, the first emblem was used on the third kit.

=== Colours ===
The club's colours have always been black and white, black for the sorrow related to countless thousands of Greek refugees who were forced to leave the land their ancestors had been living in for centuries (Asia Minor, Eastern Thrace, Pontus, Caucasus) and white for the hope of a new beginning that came with settling in a new home. PAOK's traditional kit features a black and white vertical striped shirt, combined with black or white shorts and socks. Various types of shirts were used throughout the club's history and the most common alternatives were those with thinner or wider stripes, the all-black one and the all-white one. Over the years, several other colours were used on the 3rd kit, such as grey, silver, blue, purple, orange and red.

==== Kit suppliers and shirt sponsors ====
The current kit manufacturer is Macron, a collaboration that started in July 2015 and was renewed twice until 2027. Superbet, a Romanian online gambling company, is the shirt sponsor and the sponsorship deal is set to last until 2028.

Period	Kit manufacturer	Shirt sponsor	Shirt sponsorship deal
1972–1975	Umbro	—	
1975–1977	Adidas	—	
1977–1980	Umbro	—	
1980–1981	Asics Tiger	—	
1981–1983	Puma	—	
1983–1984	Puma	Suzuki	
1984–1985	Puma	Persika (carpet factory)	5M Dr. for 1 year
1985–1986	Asics Tiger	Doperman Fashion	
1986–1987	Asics Tiger	Persika	
1987–1988	Asics Tiger	PRO-PO	
1988–1989	Asics	Coplam (doors and windows)	
1989–1990	Adidas	Coplam (doors and windows)	
1990–1991	Adidas	AGNO (dairy industry)	
1991–1992	Diadora	AGNO (dairy industry)	
1992–1993	Diadora	Nissan	
1993–1995	ABM	—	
1995–1996	Puma	Astir Insurance	
1996–1997	Puma	Ethniki Insurance	
1997–2002	Adidas	General Bank	
2002–2003	Adidas	Oikos Missias (telesales)	
2003–2005	Adidas	EKO	
2005–2006	Adidas	Egnatia Insurance	
2006–2007	Puma	—	
2007–2010	Puma	DEPA	€2.9m for 2.5 years
2010–2012	Puma	Pame Stoixima	€7.2m for 5 years
2012–2013	Umbro	Pame Stoixima	€7.2m for 5 years
2013–2015	Nike	Pame Stoixima	€7.2m for 5 years
2015–2017	Macron	Sportingbet	€2.4m for 2 years
2017–2025	Macron	Stoiximan	€5.4m for 3 years
2025–2028	Macron	Superbet	€18m for 3 years

== Facilities ==
=== Toumba Stadium ===
With PAOK's ambitions growing as the creation of a unified national championship loomed large, the club acquired land in the borough of Toumba from the Hellenic National Defence General Staff for 6,000,000 drachmae in 1957, and began a crowdfunding effort the next year. Works began in late 1958, with significant fan efforts and patronage from institutions such as the General Secretariat of Sports (today part of the Ministry of Culture), which donated ₯1,100,000 for the construction of the stadium. Toumba, officially known as PAOK Stadium, was opened in September 1959. It initially had a capacity of 20,000 and had grass pitch installed, a rarity among Greek stadiums at the time. Its creation was a costly one, and PAOK only completed the pay off of a sum of ₯1,500,000 in 1969.

Over the course of the 1960s, numerous expansions took place, first in 1962 and then in 1965, with 31,504 attending a match against Olympiacos in 1967. Floodlights were first installed for an exhibition match against AC Milan in 1970, and with another expansion in 1972, capacity was raised to over 45,000, becoming the second largest stadium in Greece at the time, behind Kaftanzoglio Stadium. The stadium's record attendance was recorded on 19 December 1976, when a league match between PAOK and AEK Athens drew 45,252 spectators. The 1978 Thessaloniki earthquake caused Toumba's Gate 8 to collapse in March 1980, rendering the stadium inoperable for over a year, and with the Karaiskakis Stadium disaster in 1981, official capacity was reduced to 41,073 in 1982. In 1985, a cantilevered roof was installed in Gates 1, 2 and 3 and new press booths were created. PAOK's financial turbulence for much of the next decade halted renovation plans, but in 1998, Toumba was converted into an all-seater stadium, with its capacity dropping to 32,000. In 2000, security zones were added, which further dropped capacity to 28,701.

Toumba underwent a major renovation for the 2004 Summer Olympics after being selected as one of the training grounds for the football tournament. The roof was demolished and replaced with a new one, while new press rooms and VIP lounges were created, along with new plastic seats and refurbishments of the pitch and concrete steel around the stadium. After Ivan Savvidis acquired ownership of PAOK in 2012, renovations continued with expansion of press rooms and miscellaneous offices and the replacement of the pitch in 2015, though the stadium's structure remained unchanged. Toumba has hosted the Greece national football team various times in its history, and is used by PAOK's women's team for its matches in UEFA competitions. For the 2024–25 season, PAOK had the third highest attendance in Greece, behind Olympiacos, AEK Athens, and Panathinaikos.

=== Planned new ground ===
PAOK administration have already presented to the Greek public authorities an architecture study of a new stadium on the location of Toumba Stadium. The Greek Council of State (CoS), the country's supreme court, in April 2022 approved a proposal to set up the complete redevelopment of Toumba Stadium, with the CoS deeming legal a draft Presidential Decree concerning the approval of a Special Urban Plan for the district of Toumba, where the venue is located. On 21 June 2022, PAOK has formalized the beginning of a collaboration with a team consisting of domestic engineering and consulting firm SALFO and global architectural design company Populous to deliver the project. It is estimated that PAOK will be granted a building permit in 2023 and the new stadium will be completed by 2026 and will have a capacity of 41,926 spectators. PAOK will probably move to Kaftanzoglio Stadium until the new Stadium is built.

New Toumba Stadium project plans present some significant changes to the original stadium, notably a giant roof covering the entire stadium which counters a common criticism of the current ground regarding exposure to weather and elements outside of Gates 1 and 2. The existing stands would be demolished and reconstructed, moving closer to the pitch and eliminating the distance from the former running track. However, as of early 2024, the project has been in a continuous stalemate.

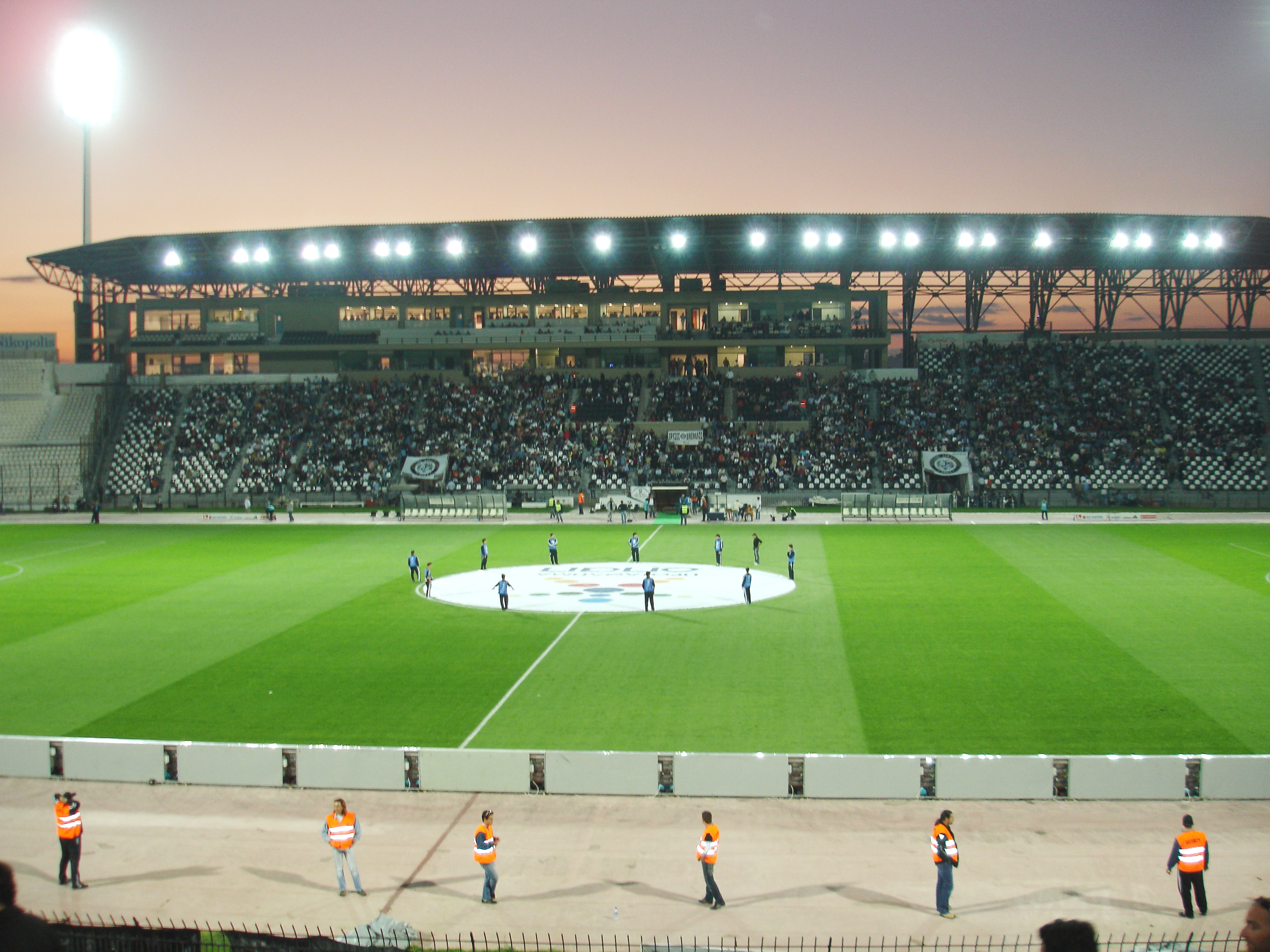
Toumba Stadium

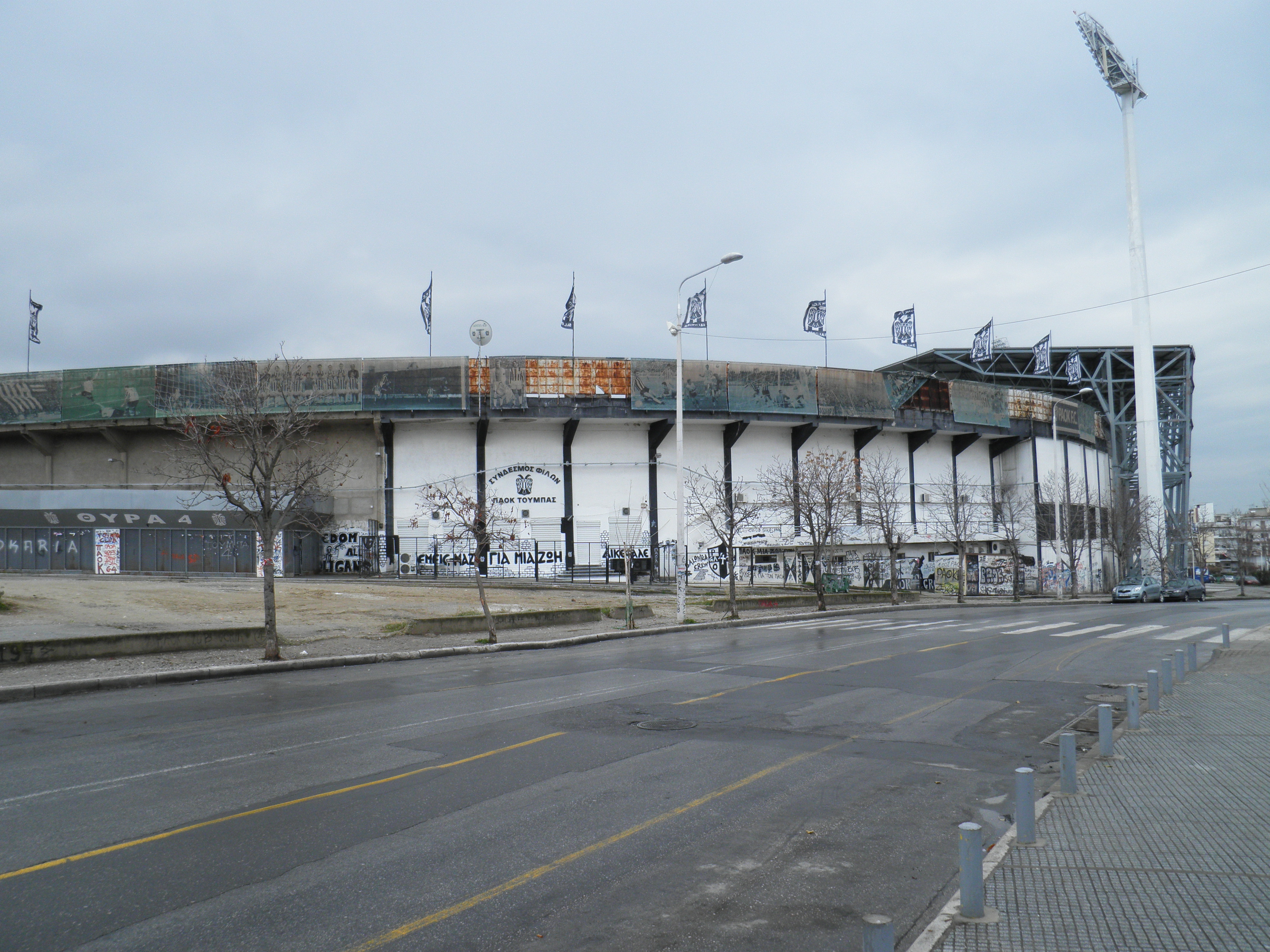
External view

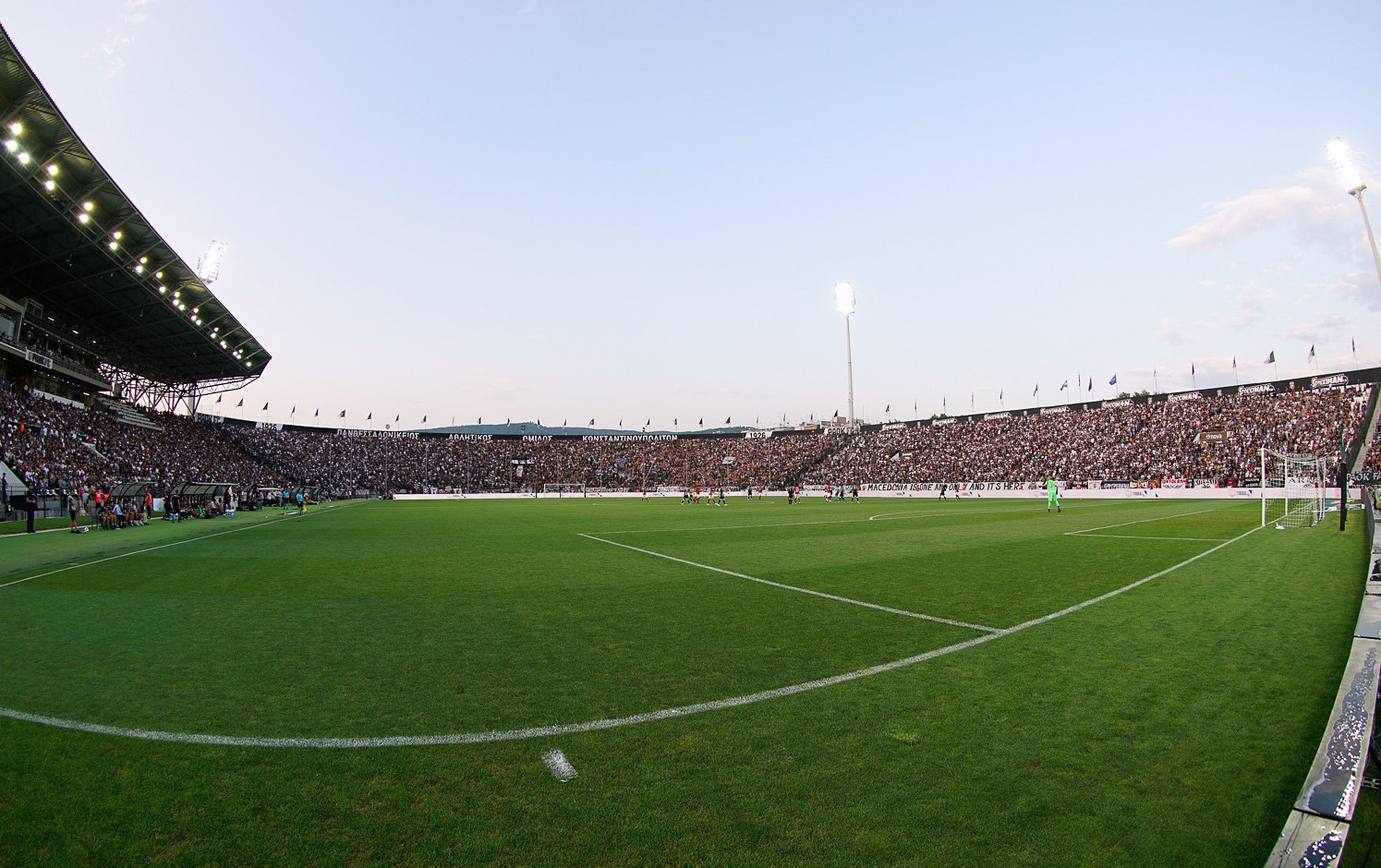
Inside view

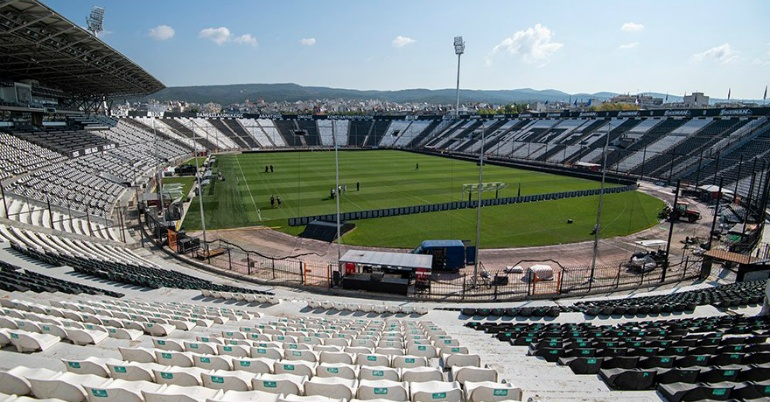
Inside view

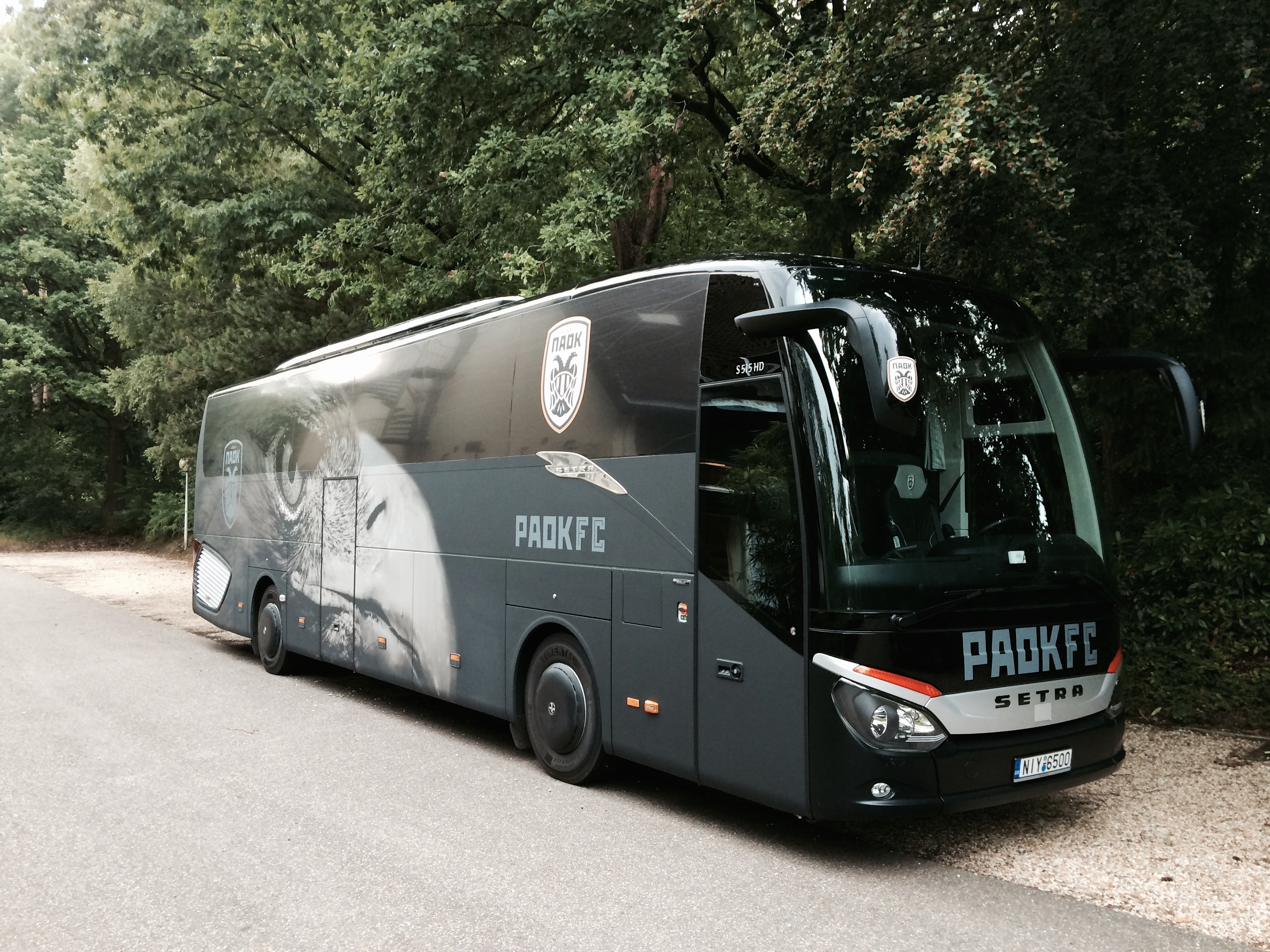
PAOK FC bus

=== Training ground ===
PAOK FC Sport Center is the training ground of the first team and Academy, located in Nea Mesimvria area of Thessaloniki. The construction started under the presidency of Theodoros Zagorakis.

=== Planned new training ground ===
On 19 January 2024, a blessing of the land where the club's new training center will be built took place. The newly acquired plot of land is located on the 8th road of the Tagarades farmland in the community of the Thermi municipality.

== Supporters ==
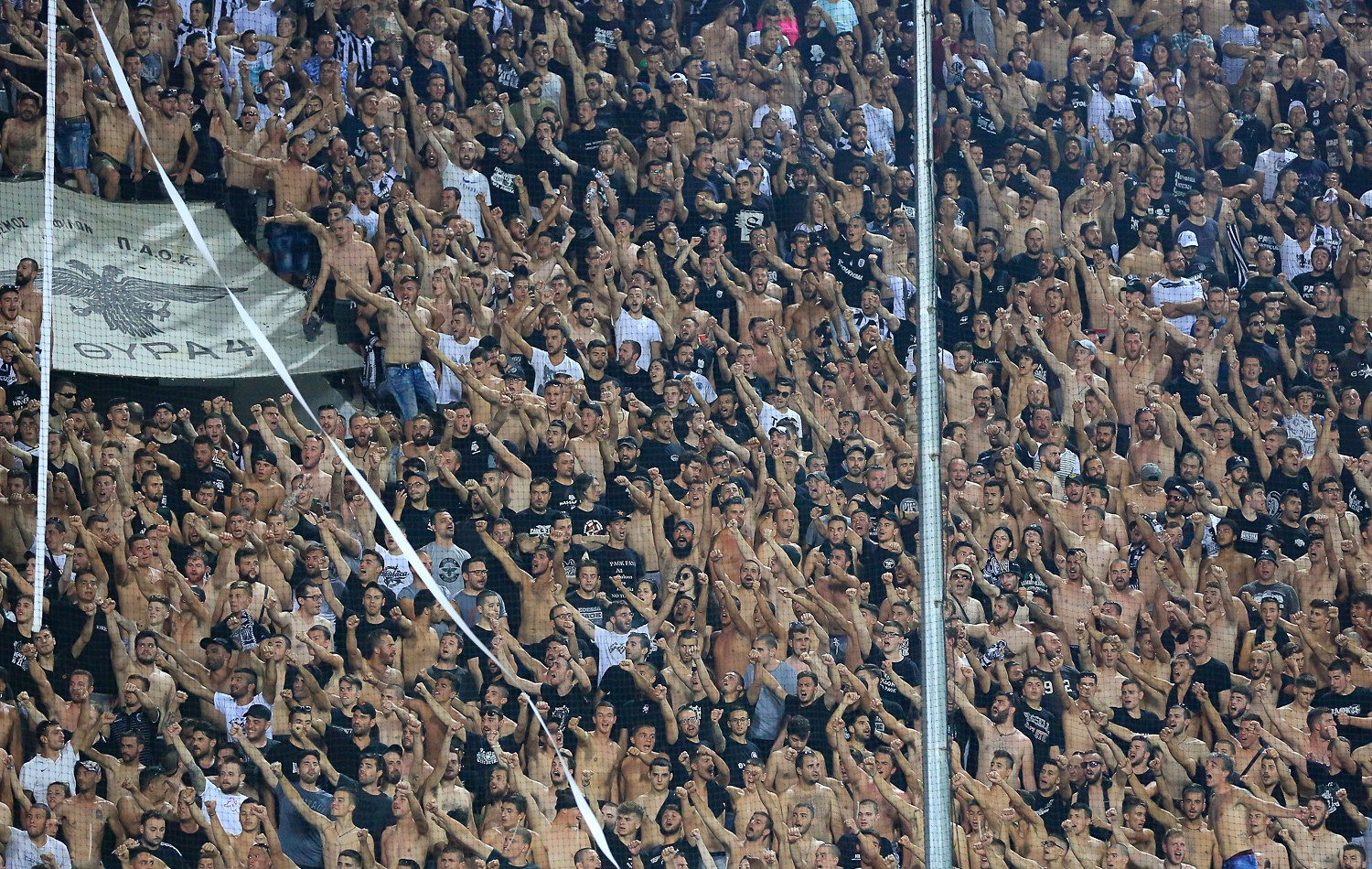
PAOK fans in Gate 4

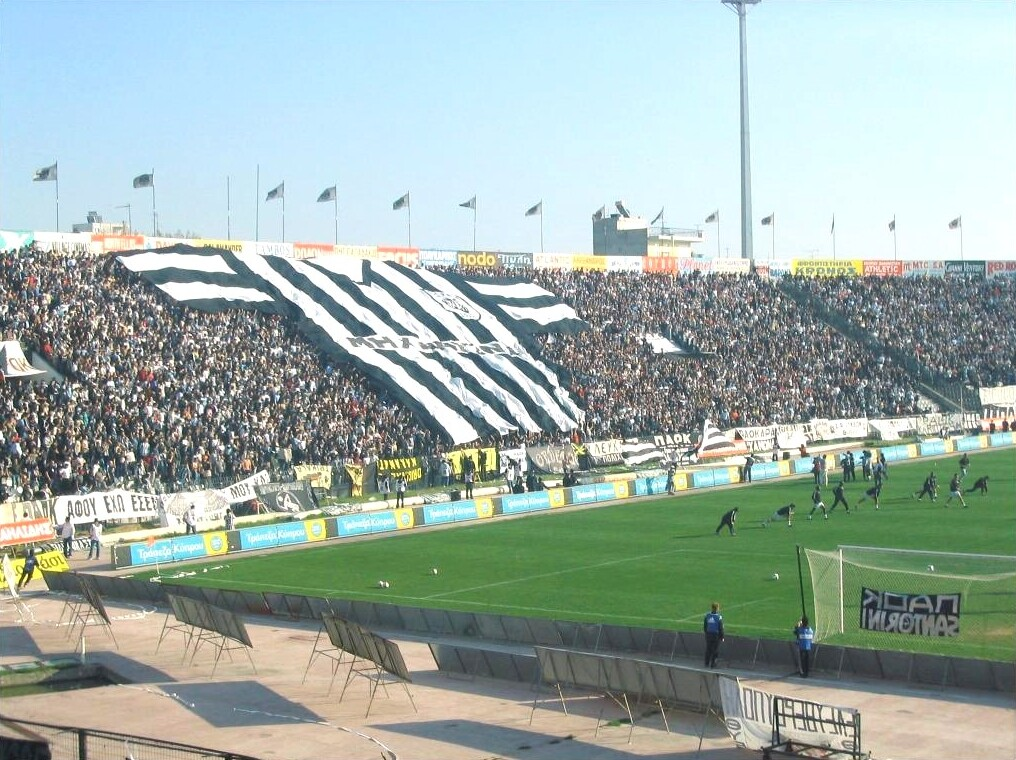
Big shirt in Toumba stadium

PAOK FC is the most widely supported football club in Northern Greece and with the 3rd largest fanbase in the country, according to the latest polls and researches.

PAOK's traditional fanbase comes from the city of Thessaloniki, where the club is based, as well as from the rest of Macedonia region and Northern Greece. They also have fans all over the country and in the Greek Diaspora (Germany, Australia, USA, etc.). Research by Marca in August 2018 reported that PAOK are the most popular Greek football team on social media.

Toumba Stadium is infamous for its hostile atmosphere, a factor that led to the attribution of the Stadium as "The Black Hell". On high-profile encounters, when the players walk out of the tunnel, the song Hells Bells by AC/DC is heard from the stadium's speakers. The notorious Gate 4 is home to many PAOK organized supporters' groups from around the globe, with the homonymous Gate 4 fan club which was founded in April 1976, being the most familiar everywhere. The supporters' group from Neapoli district of Thessaloniki that was founded in 1963 is the oldest one. One of the biggest banners in the world was created by PAOK's fan club in Michaniona.

No 12 jersey is dedicated to the fans, the symbolic 12th man on the pitch. It was permanently retired by the club on 16 August 2000.

=== Vale of Tempe tragedy (1999) ===
3,000 PAOK fans descended to the Olympic Stadium of Athens for the game against Panathinaikos on 3 October 1999. A few hours later, on its way back to Thessaloniki, the double-decker bus of the Kordelio fan club collided with a truck and fell into a ditch in the Vale of Tempe, Thessaly. The aftermath of the bus crash was devastating. Six PAOK fans lost their lives (Kyriakos Lazaridis, Christina Tziova, Anastasios Themelis, Charalampos Zapounidis, Georgios Ganatsios, Dimitris Andreadakis) and many others were injured. A roadside memorial was erected at the site of the crash bearing the following inscription: "Their love for PAOK brought them here, left them here and went beyond".

=== Romania minibus crash (2026) ===
Seven supporters of PAOK were killed and three others injured in a minibus crash in western Romania while traveling to Lyon for a UEFA Europa League match. The accident occurred on DN6 (Drumul Național 6), a single-carriageway connecting western Romania, during an overnight journey. Romanian and Greek media reported that the vehicle lost control while overtaking. A doctor treating one of the survivors stated that a lane-keeping assist system may have activated during the maneuver, after which the driver was unable to regain control. The group consisted of 10 supporters en route to the Lyon v PAOK match scheduled for Thursday evening.

The injured were initially taken to a hospital in Lugoj and later transferred to the county hospital in Timișoara. One sustained minor injuries, another suffered non-serious fractures, and a third incurred multiple fractures, including injuries to the neck and spine, though medical staff reported that his life was not in danger. Following the crash, approximately 200 PAOK supporters who had traveled to Romania gathered outside the Timișoara hospital for information and subsequently canceled their trip to France. PAOK supporters held a vigil at Toumba Stadium in Thessaloniki, where flags were flown at half-mast.

The Greek government confirmed the deaths and stated that it was coordinating with Romanian authorities through the Greek embassy to provide assistance to the victims’ families and the injured. PAOK officials traveled to Romania to support those affected, and messages of condolence were issued by the club, rival Greek teams, and Olympique Lyonnais. Lyon announced that a tribute would be held during the Europa League match, and the section reserved for visiting PAOK supporters was closed at the request of the club and supporters’ groups.

=== Supporters friendships ===
- (Serbia) Partizan
- (Russia) CSKA Moscow
- (Greece) OFI

PAOK fans maintain a strong friendship with the supporters of Serbian club Partizan, the Grobari. On many occasions, fans from both clubs traveled to watch each other's games.

A good rapport exists between PAOK and OFI fans, a friendship that started in October 1987 when OFI faced Atalanta for 1987–88 Cup Winners' Cup at Toumba Stadium and numerous PAOK fans supported the Cretans. A mutual respect stands between PAOK and Panionios fans.

=== Rivalries ===
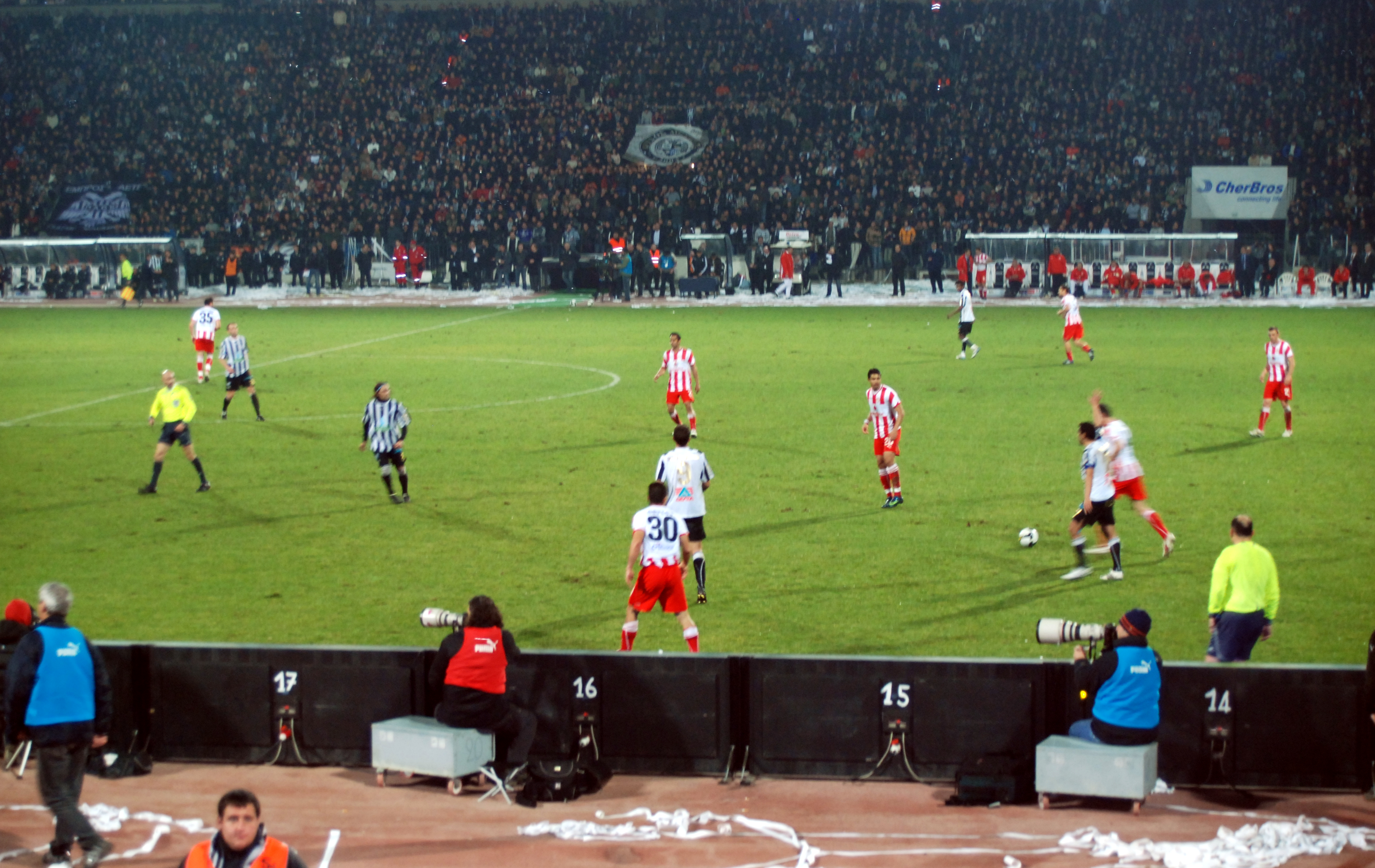
PAOK 1–0 OSFP, 2009 Greek Cup quarter-final

The rivalry between Olympiacos and PAOK is the fiercest intercity football rivalry in Greece and is long-standing, emerging in the 1960s, when Olympiacos unsuccessfully tried to acquire Giorgos Koudas from PAOK, approaching him directly without going into a negotiation with his club.The rivalry with AEK intensified significantly after the controversial 2017–18 title race, when disciplinary decisions following their match at Toumba ended PAOK's title challenge, with AEK subsequently winning the championship. A longtime heated rivalry exists between PAOK and local rivals Aris. Panathinaikos and AEK, Athens' two big clubs, are also considered major rivals. There are also some less intense rivalries, like those with Iraklis (local conflict) and AEL.

== Honours ==
PAOK FC honours
Type	Competition	Titles	Seasons
Domestic	Super League Greece	4	1975–76, 1984–85, 2018–19, 2023–24
Domestic	Greek Cup	8	1971–72, 1973–74, 2000–01, 2002–03, 2016–17, 2017–18, 2018–19, 2020–21
Regional	Macedonia FCA Championship	7	1936–37, 1947–48, 1949–50, 1953–54, 1954–55, 1955–56, 1956–57
Regional	Macedonia–Thrace FCA Championship	1	1939–40

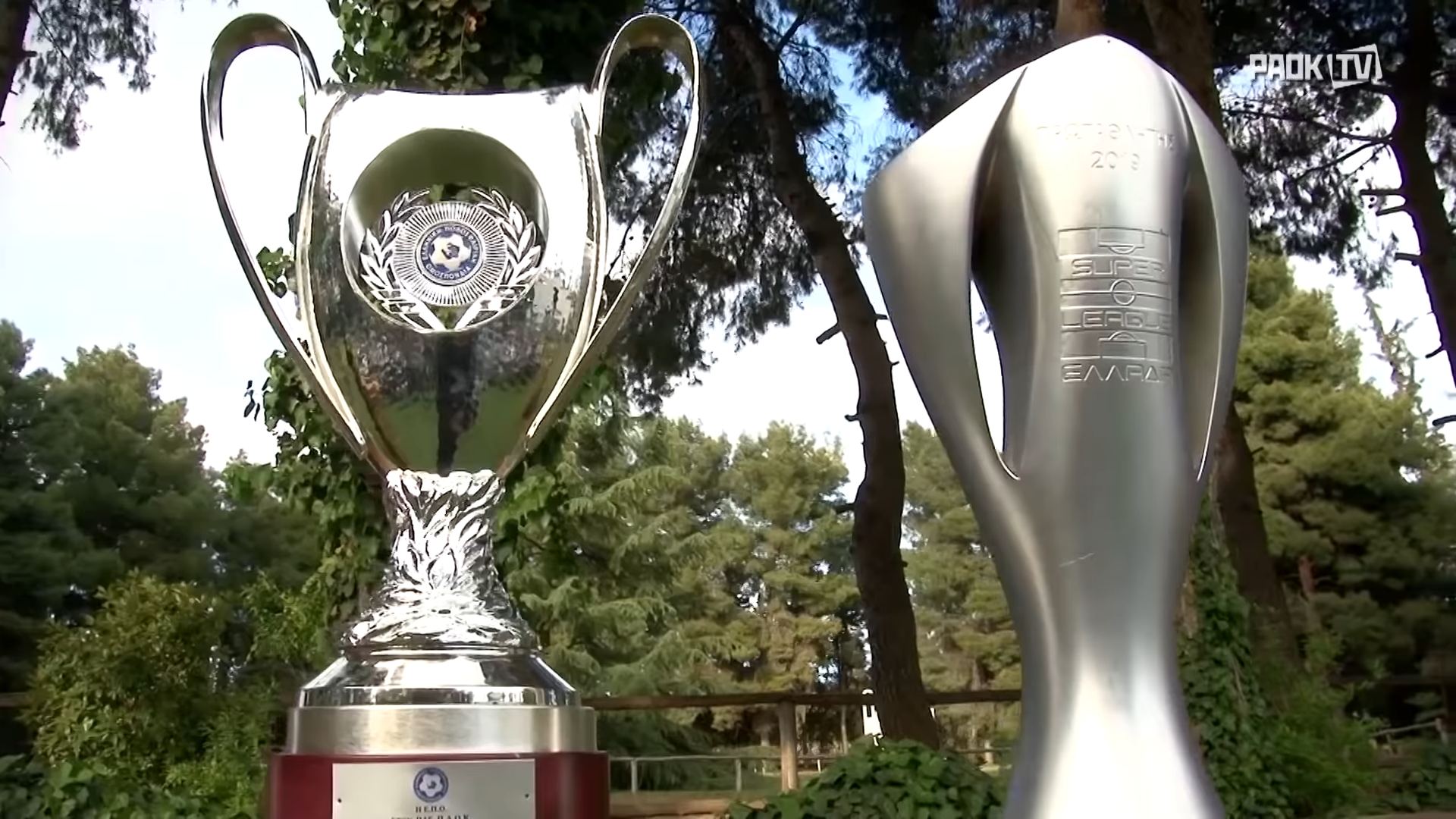
May 2019, team celebration party. Cup (left) and League (right) trophies

=== Double ===
- Winners (1): 2018–19

=== European competitions ===
- European Cup/UEFA Champions League
  - Round of 16 (1): 1976–77
- UEFA Cup Winners' Cup:
  - Quarter-finalists (1): 1973–74
- UEFA Europa League:
  - Round of 24 (2): 2024–25, 2025–26
- UEFA Conference League
  - Quarter-finalists (2): 2021–22, 2023–24

=== Minor & Unofficial Titles ===
- Greater Greece Cup
  - Winners (1): 1973
- OPAP Summer League
  - Winners (2): 1969, 1974

== European record ==
Competition	App	Pld	W	D	L	Goals
European Cup / Champions League	10	32	8	10	14	45–57
UEFA Cup / Europa League	31	178	68	49	61	254–209
UEFA Conference League	4	36	18	8	10	58–38
UEFA Cup Winners' Cup	6	18	8	5	5	24–23
Inter-Cities Fairs Cup	3	6	2	0	4	5–17
Total	54	270	104	72	94	386–344

Last updated: 27 August 2026

=== UEFA Club Ranking ===
As of 30 May 2026

Rank	Team	Coeff.
50	(Hungary) Ferencváros	51.250
51	(Czech Republic) Viktoria Plzeň	50.500
52	(Denmark) FC Midtjylland	48.250
53	(Greece) PAOK	48.250
54	(Belgium) Union Saint-Gilloise	48.000
55	(Serbia) Red Star Belgrade	46.500
56	(Croatia) Dinamo Zagreb	46.500
57	(Austria) FC Salzburg	45.000
58	(Scotland) Celtic	44.000

== Players ==
=== Current squad ===
As of 9 September 2026

Note: Flags indicate national team as defined under FIFA eligibility rules; some limited exceptions apply. Players may hold more than one non-FIFA nationality.

No.	Pos.	Nation	Player
1	GK	CZE	Jiří Pavlenka
2	MF	GUI	Mady Camara
3	DF	ENG	Jonjoe Kenny
4	DF	GRE	Pantelis Chatzidiakos
5	DF	GRE	Giannis Michailidis
6	DF	ESP	Aritz Elustondo
7	MF	FRA	Baptiste Santamaria
8	MF	FRA	Soualiho Meïté
9	FW	RUS	Fyodor Chalov
10	MF	GRE	Dimitrios Pelkas
11	MF	BRA	Taison (vice-captain)
13	DF	GRE	Dimitris Giannoulis
14	MF	SRB	Andrija Živković (captain)
16	MF	SRB	Ognjen Ugrešić
18	MF	CRO	Kristijan Jakić (on loan from Augsburg)

No.	Pos.	Nation	Player
19	DF	BRA	Diego Costa (on loan from Krasnodar)
20	MF	GRE	Christos Zafeiris
21	DF	GHA	Abdul Rahman Baba (third-captain)
22	MF	SWE	Taha Ali
23	MF	FRA	Tom Louchet
24	FW	COD	Simon Banza (on loan from Al Jazira)
27	FW	SEN	Cherif Ndiaye (on loan from Samsunspor)
32	DF	SCO	Greg Taylor
41	GK	GRE	Dimitrios Monastirlis
47	MF	ENG	Shola Shoretire
52	MF	GRE	Dimitris Chatsidis
54	GK	GRE	Konstantinos Balomenos
56	FW	GRE	Anestis Mythou
77	MF	BUL	Kiril Despodov
99	GK	GRE	Antonis Tsiftsis

=== Reserves and Academy ===
Note: Flags indicate national team as defined under FIFA eligibility rules; some limited exceptions apply. Players may hold more than one non-FIFA nationality.

No.	Pos.	Nation	Player
33	MF	GRE	Dimitrios Tsopouroglou
39	MF	GRE	Dimitris Berdos

No.	Pos.	Nation	Player
78	DF	GRE	Georgios Kosidis
97	DF	GRE	Dimitrios Bataoulas

Source: PAOK Squad

=== Out on loan ===
Note: Flags indicate national team as defined under FIFA eligibility rules; some limited exceptions apply. Players may hold more than one non-FIFA nationality.

No.	Pos.	Nation	Player
—	GK	GEO	Luka Gugeshashvili (at Göztepe until 30 June 2027)
—	DF	USA	Jonathan Gómez (at VfL Osnabrück until 30 June 2027)

No.	Pos.	Nation	Player
—	MF	ESP	Mahamadou Balde (at Levadiakos until 30 June 2027)

=== Captains (since 1959) ===
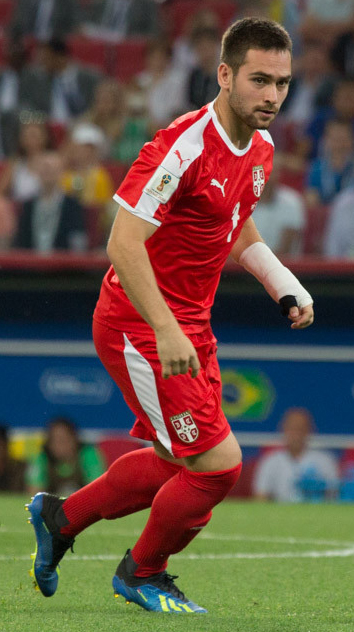
Club captain Andrija Živković

Name	Period
(Greece) Leandros Symeonidis	1959–1969
(Greece) Giorgos Koudas	1969–1974
Various (Note: Giorgos Koudas, Stavros Sarafis, Koulis Apostolidis and Giannis Gounaris were co-captains.)	1974–1980
(Greece) Giorgos Koudas	1980–1984
(Greece) Konstantinos Iosifidis	1984–1985
(Greece) Nikos Alavantas	1985–1989
(Greece) Georgios Skartados	1989–1992
(Greece) Alexandros Alexiou	1992–1996
(Greece) Theodoros Zagorakis	1996–1998
(Greece) Giorgos Toursounidis	1998–1999
(Greece) Kostas Frantzeskos	1999–2000
(Greece) Anastasios Katsabis	2000–2002
(Greece) Pantelis Kafes	2002–2003
(Greece) Loukas Karadimos	2003–2004

Name	Period
(Greece) Dimitris Salpingidis	2004–2005
(Greece) Theodoros Zagorakis	2005–2007
(Greece) Georgios Georgiadis	2007–2008
(Greece) Pantelis Konstantinidis	2008–2009
(Portugal) Sérgio Conceição	2009–2010
(Greece) Kostas Chalkias	2010–2012
(Uruguay) Pablo García	2012–2013
(Greece) Dimitris Salpingidis	2013–2014
(Greece) Stefanos Athanasiadis	2014–2017
(Greece) Stelios Malezas	2017–2018
(Portugal) Vieirinha	2018–2025
(Serbia) Andrija Živković	2025–

=== MVP of the Season ===
Year	Winner
1989–90	(Greece) Georgios Skartados
1990–91	(Greece) Georgios Mitsibonas
1991–92	(Greece) Alexandros Alexiou
1992–93	(Greece) Alexandros Alexiou
1993–94	(Greece) Alexandros Alexiou
1994–95	(Greece) Alexandros Alexiou
1995–96	(Greece) Paraschos Zouboulis
1996–97	(Greece) Theodoros Zagorakis
1997–98	(Greece) Kostas Frantzeskos
1998–99	(Greece) Kostas Frantzeskos
1999–2000	(Greece) Kostas Frantzeskos
2000–01	(Greece) Pantelis Konstantinidis
2001–02	(Cyprus) Ioannis Okkas
2002–03	(Cyprus) Ioannis Okkas
2003–04	(Greece) Dimitris Salpingidis
2004–05	(Greece) Dimitris Salpingidis
2005–06	(Greece) Dimitris Salpingidis
2006–07	(Poland) Marcin Mięciel
2007–08	(Portugal) Daniel Fernandes

Year	Winner
2008–09	(Greece) Kostas Chalkias
2009–10	(Brazil) Lino
2010–11	(Portugal) Vieirinha
2011–12	(Uruguay) Pablo García
2012–13	(Brazil) Lino
2013–14	(Brazil) Lino
2014–15	(Albania) Ergys Kaçe
2015–16	(Greece) Georgios Tzavellas
2016–17	(Greece) Panagiotis Glykos
2017–18	(Portugal) Vieirinha
2018–19	(Portugal) Vieirinha
2019–20	(Croatia) Josip Mišić
2020–21	(Greece) Christos Tzolis
2021–22	(Slovenia) Jasmin Kurtić
2022–23	(Greece) Giannis Konstantelias
2023–24	(Serbia) Andrija Živković
2024–25	(Guinea) Mady Camara
2025–26	(Greece) Giannis Konstantelias

== Management ==
=== Coaching staff ===
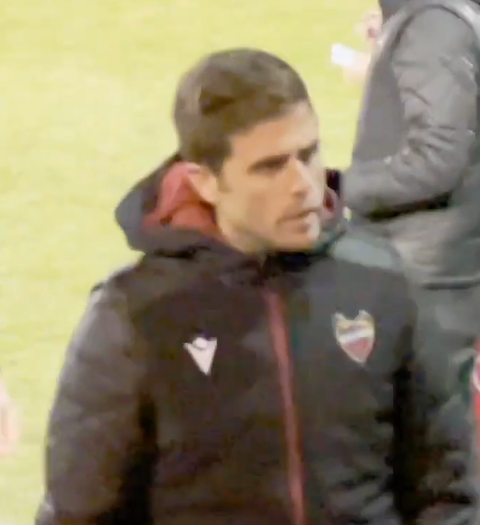
Alessio Lisci (pictured in 2021)

Coaching staff
(Italy) Alessio Lisci	Head coach
(Spain) Moises Hurtado	Assistant Coach
(Spain) Dani Ponz	Assistant Coach
(Italy) Massimo Carcarino	Assistant Coach
(Greece) Petros Tsiapakidis	Assistant Coach
(Greece) Vangelis Lappas	Goalkeeping coach
Fitness coaches
(Spain) Alberto Gines	Fitness Coach
(Greece) Vasilios Kanaras	Rehabilitation Coaches
(Greece) Anestis Aslanidis	Rehabilitation Coaches
Analyst department|-
(Greece) Ioannis Thomaidis	Opponent analyst
(Greece) Makis Kosmidis	Opponent analyst
(Greece) Ioannis Tsaniklidis	Analyst Vis track
(Spain) Juan Garcia	Analyst Vis track

==== Sport management ====
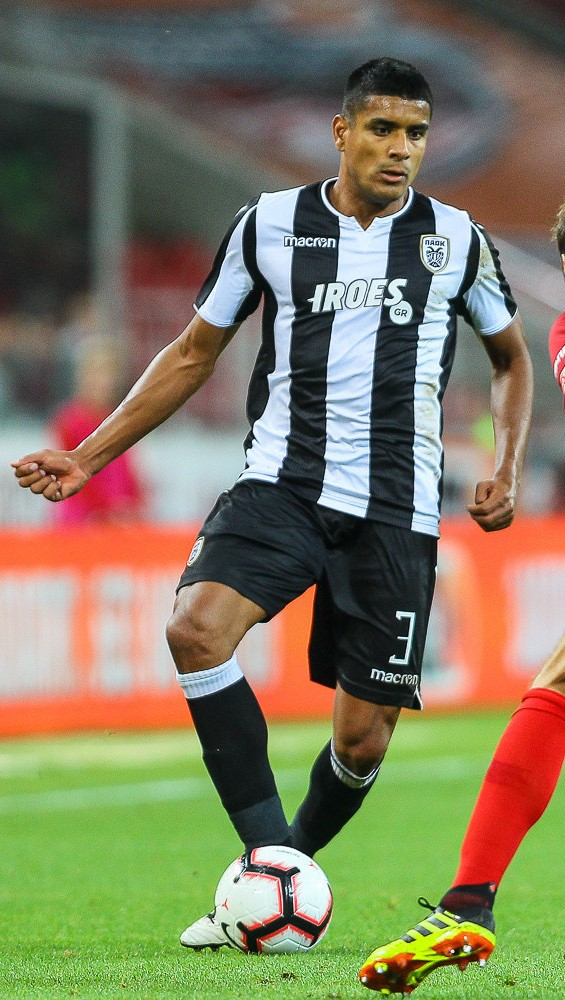
Leo Matos (pictured in 2018)

Sport management
(Brazil) Leo Matos	Athletic Director
(Portugal) Vieirinha	Technical Director
(Greece) Panagiotis Tsiknas	Deputy Executive
(Greece) Giorgos Theodoridis	Team Manager
Scouting Department
(Italy) Matteo Serra	Head of Scout
(Greece) Lefteris Notaridis	Scouting
(Greece) Vassilis Eleftheriadis	Scouting

==== Medical Staff ====
Medical Staff
(Greece) Dr. Ioannis Rallis	Directors of Medical Staff
(Greece) Dr. Periklis Papadopoulos	Head of Medical Staff
(Greece) Dr. Ioannis Gigis	Head of Medical Staff
(Greece) Dr. Konstantinos Ditsios	Head of Medical Staff
(Greece) Dr. Theocharis Kyriakidis	Team Doctor
(Greece) Ioanna Paspala	Nutritionist
Physiotherapist
(Greece) Athanasios Kapoulas	Head of Physiotherapist
(Greece) Petros Nikolakoudis	Physiotherapist
(Greece) Nikos Mouratidis	Physiotherapist
(Greece) Georgios Giannikos	Physiotherapist
(Greece) Vagelis Vasiliadis	Physiotherapist

Source: PAOK Staff

=== Notable managers ===
The following managers won at least one trophy when in charge of PAOK:

Name	Period	Trophies
(England) Les Shannon	1971–1974	2 Greek Cups, Greater Greece Cup
(Hungary) Gyula Lóránt	1974–1976	Alpha Ethniki
(Austria) Walter Skocik	1984–1986	Alpha Ethniki
(Bosnia and Herzegovina) Dušan Bajević	2000–2002	Greek Cup
(Greece) Angelos Anastasiadis	2002–2004	Greek Cup
(Serbia) Vladimir Ivic	2016–2017	Greek Cup
(Romania) Răzvan Lucescu	2017–2019, 2021–2026	2 Super League Greece, 2 Greek Cups
(Uruguay) Pablo García	2020–2021	Greek Cup

=== Club personnel ===
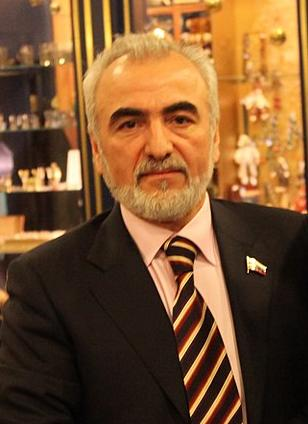
Chairman 2013-present Ivan Savvidis

Position	Name
Owner	Dimera Group Limited Ltd
Chairman	(Russia) | (Greece) Ivan Savvidis
CEO	(Greece) Agesilaos Toumazatos
A Vice President	(Russia) Maria Goncharova
B Vice President	(Greece) Aggelos Anastasiadis
Board of Directors	(Greece) Antonis Kiourexidis
Board of Directors	(Greece) Dr Periklis Papadopoulos
Board of Directors	(Greece) Dimitris Moutsakis
Board of Directors	(Greece) Marios Tsakas
Board of Directors	(Greece) Bouloubasis Christos
Strategic Development	(Greece) Andreas Papamimikos
Special Consultant	(Greece) Anastasios Tzikas
Head of Football Operations	(Greece) Pantelis Thomareis
General Manager of Sports Facilities	(Greece) Giannis Dimogiannis
Director of the Commercial Department	(Greece) Lazaros Baxevanos
Media Director	(Greece) Giorgos Kouventidis

Source: PAOK Board

=== PAOK FC Presidential History ===
From the organization of the 1979–80 Alpha Ethniki Greece Football Clubs Association became professional, as based on a bill submitted on January 19, 1979 (Law 879/1979) the Greece Football Clubs Association (FCA) department of the club PAOK FC was converted into a Football Anonyme Company A.E.

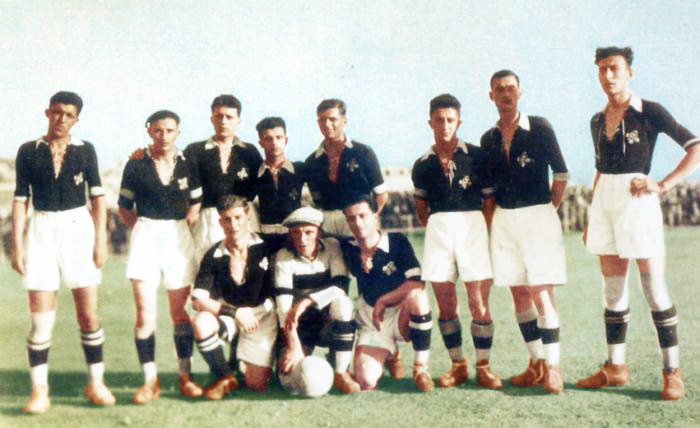
The football team of 1926

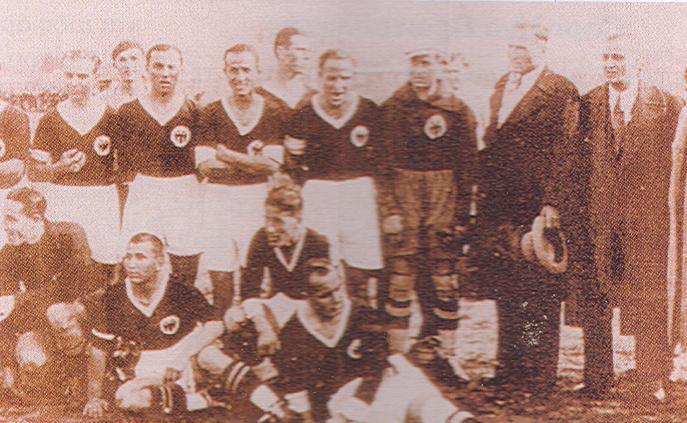
The team of 1939

Period	Name
1926–1927	(Greece) Triantafilos Triantafylidis
1927–1928	(Greece) Vyzantios Fanourios
1928–1929	(Greece) Konstantinos Meletiou
1929–1930	(Greece) Athinodoros Athinodorou
1930–1931	(Greece) Pantelis Kalpatsoglou
1931–1933	(Greece) Petros Levantis
1933–1935	(Greece) Savvas Tsantas
1935–1936	(Greece) Filaretos Tsompesoglou
1936–1938	(Greece) Savas Tsantas
1938–1939	(Greece) Ioannis Tsakiroglou
1939–1940	(Greece) Dimitrios Kamaras
1940–1944	(Greece) Pantelis Kalpatsoglou
1944–1946	(Greece) Filaretos Tsompesoglou
1946–1948	(Greece) Pantelis Kalpatsoglou
1948–1949	(Greece) Mirodis Dimitrakopoulos
1949–63	(Greece) Georgios Charalampidis
1963–64	(Greece) Ippokratis Iordanoglou
1964–66	(Greece) Dimitrios Dimadis
1966–69	(Greece) Vassilios Zervas
1969	(Greece) Evangelos Mylonas
1969–1971	(Greece) Stavros Georgiadis
1971–1972	(Greece) Ioannis Arvanitakis
1972–1973	(Greece) Stratos Simitzis
1973–1974	(Greece) Ioannis Arvanitakis

Period	name
1974	(Greece) Georgios Zografos
1974–1975	(Greece) Arthouros Mardikian
1975–1981	(Greece) Georgios Pantelakis
1984–1986	(Greece) Petros Kalafatis
1986–1988	(Greece) Charis Savvidis
1988–1989	(Greece) Ioannis Dedeoglou
1989–1990	(Greece) Thomas Voulinos
1990	(Greece) Apostolos Alexopoulos
1990–1996	(Greece) Thomas Voulinos
1996	(Greece) Georgios Kalyvas
1996–1998	(Greece) Georgios Batatoudis
1998	(Greece) Petros Kalafatis
1998–2001	(Greece) Georgios Batatoudis
2001–2003	(Greece) Petros Kalafatis
2003–2004	(Greece) Ioannis Goumenos
2004	(Greece) Vasilios Pagonis
2004-2006	(Greece) Ioannis Goumenos
2006–2007	(Greece) Nikos Vezyrtzis
2007–2010	(Greece) Theodoros Zagorakis
2010–2014	(Greece) Zisis Vryzas
2014–2016	(Cyprus) Iakovos Aggelidis
2016	(Slovakia) Ľuboš Micheľ
2016–	(Greece) (Russia) Ivan Savvidis

== Records and statistics ==
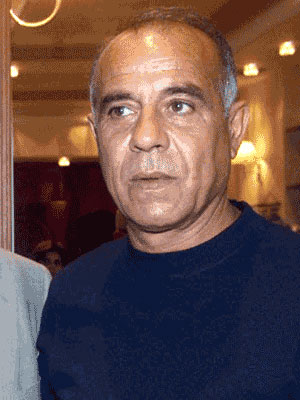
Legendary Giorgos Koudas, a powerful attacking midfielder, is the appearances recordman and second all-time goalscorer of the club.

=== One-club men ===
Player	Position	Debut	Last match
(Greece) Leandros Symeonidis	MF	1 July 1954	1 July 1969
(Greece) Giorgos Koudas	MF	21 December 1963	26 February 1984
(Greece) Stavros Sarafis	MF	8 October 1967	7 June 1981
(Greece) Konstantinos Iosifidis	DF	19 September 1971	16 June 1985

=== Player records ===
Giorgos Koudas holds the record for most PAOK league appearances, having played 504 matches (607 overall) from 1963 to 1984.

Stavros Sarafis is the club's top goalscorer with 169 goals overall (136 in league matches), from 1967 to 1981.

The "Greatest Ever" squad chosen by dugoutworldwide.com

Most league appearances:

Rank	Name	Apps
1	(Greece) Giorgos Koudas	504
2	(Greece) Kostas Iosifidis	397
3	(Greece) Giannis Gounaris	376
4	(Greece) Stavros Sarafis	358
5	(Greece) Aristotelis Fountoukidis	336
6	(Greece) Koulis Apostolidis	281
7	(Greece) Georgios Skartados	265
8	(Greece) Dimitris Salpingidis	262
9	(Greece) Giorgos Toursounidis	261
10	(Portugal) Vieirinha	253

League top goalscorers:

Rank	Name	Goals
1	(Greece) Stavros Sarafis	136
2	(Greece) Giorgos Koudas	133
3	(Greece) Dimitris Salpingidis	90
4	(Greece) Georgios Skartados	84
5	(Greece) Georgios Kostikos	78
6	(Greece) Stefanos Athanasiadis	71
7	(Brazil) Neto Guerino	66
8	(Greece) Panagiotis Kermanidis	60
9	(Greece) Achilleas Aslanidis	55
10	(Greece) Koulis Apostolidis	51

=== Domestic records ===
Outline	Record
Double winners, going unbeaten in a national round-robin league tournament (league format since 1959).	2018–19 season
Champions, starting the season with a points deduction.	2018–19 Super League Greece (PAOK started the season on –2 points)
Worst league title defence.	10th place (1985–86)
Most consecutive league games scoring.	69 (PAOK lost two games 0–3 by court decision during this period that are not taken into account)
Most consecutive league games scoring away.	35 (5/11/2017 → 3/2/2020)
Fewest league goals conceded at home in a season.	3 in 17 games (1994–95)
Most seasons with a points deduction.	9 (1963–64, 1986–87, 1990–91, 1995–96, 2013–14, 2015–16, 2016–17, 2017–18, 2018–19)
Most consecutive seasons with a points deduction.	4 (2015–16, 2016–17, 2017–18, 2018–19)
Record league win against Olympiacos.	PAOK 6–1 Olympiacos (6/12/1987) – Serres Municipal Stadium
Record league away win against Olympiacos.	Olympiacos 0–4 PAOK (4/1/1976) – Karaiskakis Stadium
Winners of 3 consecutive Greek Cup finals against the same opponent.	2017, 2018 and 2019 Greek Cup finals (vs AEK Athens)
Winners of 2 consecutive Greek Cup finals that were held at the opponent's home ground.	2018 and 2019 Greek Cup finals (held at Athens Olympic Stadium, AEK Athens's home ground at the time)
Greek Cup runners-up.	15 times
Biggest European win by a Greek football club.	Locomotive Tbilisi 0–7 PAOK (16 September 1999, UEFA Cup)
Consecutive continental away wins.	4 (2023–24 season)
Most points for a Greek football club in a European competition group stage.	16 (W5–D1–L0), 2023–24 UEFA Conference League
Won all away matches in the group stage of a European competition.	3 (2023–24 UEFA Conference League)
Most UEFA Europa League appearances.	29
Most consecutive UEFA Europa League appearances.	12
Most UEFA Conference League matches.	34

== See also ==
- P.A.O.K.
- History of PAOK FC
- List of PAOK FC managers
- PAOK B
- Greek refugees
- PAOK F.C. in European football
- List of PAOK FC records and statistics
- List of PAOK FC seasons
- PAOK FC (women)
- Thessaloniki
- Toumba (Thessaloniki)
- Toumba Stadium
- PAOK FC Sport Center
- PAOK Academy
- P.A.O.K. H.C.
- P.A.O.K H.C Women's Handball

== Bibliography ==
- Kanotas, Miltiadis (2005). 80 χρόνια, αυτός είναι ο ΠΑΟΚ [80 years, this is PAOK] (in Greek). Greece: Thessaloniki Publications.
- Kyritsis, Dimitris; Stefanidis, Anestis; Tsiompanoudi, Eleni (2005). ΠΑΟΚ, Πανθεσσαλονίκειος Αθλητικός Όμιλος Κωνσταντινοπουλιτών 1926–2005 [PAOK, Pan-Thessalonian Athletic Club of Constantinopolitans 1926–2005] (in Greek). Greece: Thessaloniki History Center. ISBN 978-960-88595-2-4.
- Bliatkas, Kostas (2005). Γιώργος Κούδας, της ζωής μου το παιχνίδι [Giorgos Koudas, the game of my life] (in Greek). Greece: Ianos Publications. ISBN 978-960-7827-35-7.
- Collective work (2009). Για πάντα πρωταθλητές, Π.Α.Ο.Κ. Ποδόσφαιρο-Μπάσκετ [Champions forever, P.A.O.K. Football-Basketball] (in Greek). Greece: SKAI. ISBN 978-960-482-020-7.
- Tsallos, Alexios (2010). Το αλφαβητάρι του ΠΑΟΚ [The PAOK alphabet book] (in Greek). Greece: Diavlos Publications. ISBN 978-960-531-259-6.
- Tsiolis, Stavros (2011). Ταξιδεύοντας με τον ΠΑΟΚ [Traveling with PAOK] (in Greek). Greece: Aigokeros Publications. ISBN 978-960-322-419-8.
- Petrakopoulos, Stavros (2016). Τα «μυθικά» του ΠΑΟΚ [PAOK’s ‘legendary’ moments] (in Greek). Greece: Friends Press. ISBN 978-618-82397-0-8.
- Zampounis, Christos (2016). ΠΑΟΚ αφού [PAOK, after all] (in Greek). Greece: Fereniki Publications. ISBN 978-960-9513-58-6.
- Ioannidis, Nikos (2017). Μια εποχή στο τσιμέντο [An era on the concrete] (in Greek). Greece: Topos Publications. ISBN 978-960-499-192-1.
- Edirnelis, Socrates (2018). Το κλεμμένο πρωτάθλημα [The stolen championship] (in Greek). Greece: ALDE Publications. ISBN 978-960-9451-89-5.
- Pappous, Michalis (2019). Ο ΠΑΟΚ του '70 [The PAOK of the '70s] (in Greek). Greece: University Studio Press. ISBN 978-960-12-2421-3.
- Vasilopoulos, Kostas (2023). Ραζβάν Λουτσέσκου, Double PAOK [Razvan Lucescu, Double PAOK] (in Greek). Greece: Fereniki Publications. ISBN 978-960-9513-89-0.

== Filmography ==
- Nikos Triantafyllidis. 90 χρόνια ΠΑΟΚ – Νοσταλγώντας το μέλλον [90 years of PAOK – Nostalgia for the future], 2016.
