= PAOK Academy =

- Full name: PAOK Academy
- Founded: 1952
- Ground: PAOK FC Sport Center, Nea Mesimvria
- Capacity: 300
- Owner: PAOK FC
- Chairman: Ivan Savvidis
- League: Superleague U19, U17, U15
- 2019-2020: 1st
- Website: http://www.paokfc.gr/en/paok-academy-en/
Home colours	Away colours

PAOK Academy is the football academy system of Greek professional football club PAOK consisting of eleven official youth teams (Under-6/7, Under-8, Under-9, Under-10, Under-11, Under-12, Under-13, Under-14, Under-15, Under-17 and Under-20), based on the young athletes' age. PAOK's U15, U17 and U20 teams all play in Greek Super League's (Superleague U15, U17 and U20 respectively). Ιn 2016–17 season, U20 team participated in UEFA Youth League as a champion on official superleague U17 2015–16. This academy holds more than 280 young players, and also more than 50 people work there (coaches, trainers, doctors etc.). The PAOK Academy maintains 16 training centers outside of Thessaloniki. These are in Athens, Didimoticho, Alexandroupoli, Komotini - Xanthi, Kilkis, Kavala, Drama, Kozani, Katerini, Lamia, Corfu, Rethymnon, Chios, Chalkidiki, Cyclades and Rhodes.

== History ==
The first youth academy was created in 1952. The visionary was Austrian coach Wilhelm (Willi) Sefzik. His dream was to be able to bring out new talents that could evolve from an early age into the PAOK team. In 2007–2009, The former president Theodoros Zagorakis began the rebirth of the academies. Vangelis Pourliotopoulos undertook the reorganization, and for the first time in PAOK history started an organized effort of the club to exploit, to bring out new talents, and promote young footballers systematically from the infrastructure departments of PAOK's to the first team. In 2009, the cost reached €1 million per year. At that time the "Football Prints" program was created. Today more than 90 academies participate in this program. In 2008, the first hostels in the Toumba Stadium were inaugurated. In the first three years, the hostels accommodated 14 children, who came from outside Thessaloniki

The evolution of academies continues to date, with Ivan Savvidis investing in a new home that will host young footballers. In September 2015, the PAOK Academy acquired a seven-storey building in the center of Thessaloniki, where 55 young football players live there. The cost of academies has now reached €2 million per year, making it the most expensive academy in Greece. According to the International Center for Sports Studies (CIES), the club has the best academies in Greece.

== Organization ==
PAOK invest in setting up its own football schools to bring out talented children. To this day the club maintains 13 training centers in every corner of the country. PAOK FC youth sections, with the assistance of their network of collaborating academies (football prints), select the most talented players of each region, in order to have them train often and gradually follow the schedules and aims of the PAOK academy players.

The objective of the club is encounter young talented athletes aged no more than 12, and hand them at least 7 years of proper the footballing education, so that they can dive into the mentality and philosophy of their club. The scouting team visits each training centre once each month, in order to supervise the children's progress. Some distinguished children are invited to Thessaloniki to join the PAOK Academy, which will be staying at PAOK's house.

Since 2013, PAOK maintains a cooperation with Juventus on the academies sector.

== Football Prints ==
PAOK football prints, is a network of academies working with the PAOK academy. Football Prints network functions through a communication system that is based on the eagerness of local academies to work and push talented children. The coordination of all academies has the Vangelis Pourliotopoulos and Kyriakos Alexandridis. In 2014, PAOK FC also organized their first "PAOK Football Prints Network Tournament". Since 2009, the club hold the annual youth tournament “Panagiotis Katsouris” in his memory, a renowned tournament and among the best in the Balkans.

=== List of academies ===
The 90 academies of "Football Prints" in Greece, according to geographic criteria.

Location of "Football Prints" in Greece

Greece

- Alexandroupoli: Pontiakos Alexandroupolis,
- Argos: PAOK Koutsopodiou.
- Arta: Dias Kostakion Arta.
- Aspropyrgos: Pyrichios PAOK FC Aspropyrgou.
- Athens: Athens Cosmos Club, Mikrasiatikos Kaisarianis.
- Chalkida: PAOK Kanithou Chalkidas.
- Chalkidiki: Elpides Marmara, PAOK Stavrou.
- Chania: Arena fc PAOK, Calcetto FC Chania.
- Corfu: Olympiada Karousadon.
- Didymoteicho: PAOK Iasmos, PAOK Isaakiou.
- Drama: PAOK Megas Alexandros, Prosotsani, Fillipos Dramas.
- Florina: Pas Florina.
- Heraklion: Lido Soccer, Atsalenios academy.
- Imathia: Meliki Academy
- Ioannina: PAS Asteras Ioaninon.
- Karpenisi: PAOK Karpenisiou.
- Kastoria: Kronos Kastorias.
- Katerini: Katerini academy 2006.
- Kavala: Orfeas Eleftheroupolis, Mundialito, PAOK Kavalas, Aetos Orfanou. PAOK Frixos Eleftheroupolis
- Kilkis: Alexandros Kilkis, PAOK Kristonis.
- Komotini: Fair Play, PAOK Komitini.
- Konitsa: PAOK Konitsa, Pindos Konitsa.
- Kos: PAOK Kos.
- Kozani: Koilon academy, Siatista academy.
- Lefkada: Tilikratis Lefkada, Panlefkadios.
- Lemnos: Filoktitis Kontia.
- Lesbos: Apollon Vounarakiou.
- Orestiada: Oinoi Orestiadas.
- Patra: Keravnos Agiou Vasiliou.
- Paxoi: Paxoi academy.
- Pella: Athletic Academy Skydras, PAOK Patriarxio, Apollon Kruas Vrisis.
- Pieria: Giotsa academy, Makrygialos, Play Zone 2006.
- Preveza: Real Team Preveza, RIA Sport academy.
- Ptolemaida: Hercules Ptolemaidas.
- Rethymno: Astera Rethymnou.
- Rhodes: Euklhs Soronis., Asteras Pastida.
- Skiathos: AO Skiathos academy.
- Serres: Niki Christou, Ethnikos Sidirokastrou, Alistrati.
- Thasos: Theagenis Thasos. akademy AO Ptamias
- Thesprotia: Elpides Acheronta, Doxa Gardikiou.
- Thessaloniki: Proteas, Achilleas Pereas, Elpides Sikeon, Bebides Ionias, Kypseli Neapolis, Liti academy, Academy MAS Atromitos Triadiou, GS Ilioupoli, Lykoi, AE falirou, PAOK Kymina-Malgara, Malakopi Pylaias, Aetoi fc, Doxa Drymou, Ioannis Papafis academy, Magnisiakos, M. Alexandros Kaloxoriou, Champions Pefkon, Keravnos Agiou Pavlou, Ethnikos Sohou, Diaplasi Oreokastro, Achilleas Triandrias, Doxa Elpidas Evosmou, Toumba FC.
- Veria: Doxa Makroxoriou.
- Xanthi: Elpides PAOK Xanthi.

Cyprus

- Larnaca: Nuovo Calcio .
- Pano Polemidia: Karmiotissa Anorthosi Polemidion.
- Paphos: Olympico academy.

Germany

- Krefeld: Hellas Krefeld.
- Troisdorf: Hellas Troisdorf.
- Munich: PAOK FC Pontos.
- Offenbach: PAOK Offenbach.
- Essen: Thessaloniki Essen
- Wiesbaden: Hellas Wiesbaden.

Israel

- Nazareth: PAOK Millya Academy.

Sweden

- Stockholm: Akropolis IF.

Australia

- Adelaide: Adelaide Olympic FC.

Serbia

- Nis: FC Real Nis

== Academy Personnel ==
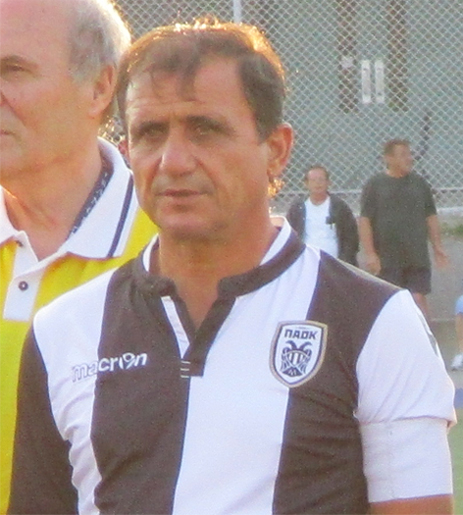
Kyriakos Alexandridis Football Prints Supervisor

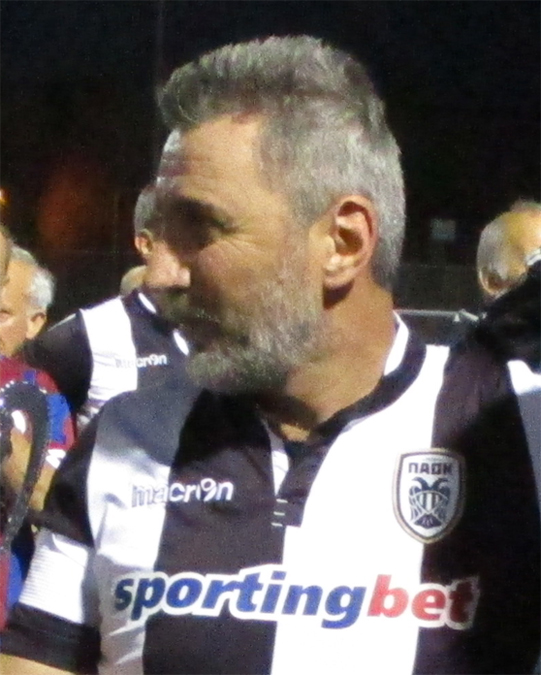
Stefanos Borbokis Scout

Sport management and organisation
(Greece) Vangelis Pourliotopoulos	General Manager
(Greece) Georgios Georgiadis	Technical Director
(Greece) Giorgos Theodoridis	U19 Team Manager
	U17, U15 Team Manager
(Greece) Kyriakos Alexandridis	Football Prints Supervisor
(Greece) Grigoris Karavelis	Technical Advisor
(Greece) Konstantinos Vourtsis	Functional Overhang
(Greece) Ioanna Charalampous	Student Officer
Team coaches
(Greece) Petros Tsiapakidis	U19 Coach
(Greece) Dimitrios Orfanos	U17 Coach
(Greece) Petros Tsiapakidis	U15 Coach
(Greece) Dimitris Orfanos	U14 Coach
(Greece) Andreas Balabanis	U13 Coach
(Greece) Savvas Konstantinidis	U12 Coach
(Greece) Georgios Gourtsas	U11 Coach
(Greece) Spyridon Koulouris	U10 Coach
(Greece) Antonis Krinitsas	U9 Coach
(Greece) Maria Exadaktylou, (Greece) Magdalini Tsoukala	U7, U6 Coach
Fitness coaches
(Greece) Evagelos Alexopoulos	U19 Fitness coach
(Ghana) Ebenezer Hagan	U17 Fitness coach
(Greece) Vasileios Bilis	U15 Fitness coach
Analysis department
(Greece) Ioannis Vlachos	Head Analyst
(Greece) Ilias Galanopoulos	Match Analyst
(Greece) Alexandros Theodoridis	Data Analyst
(Greece) Ioannis Abatzidis	Data Analyst
(Greece) Ioannis Avramidis	Head Scout
(Greece) Kostas Lagonidis	Scouting
(Greece) Stefanos Borbokis	Scouting
Medical department
(Greece) Dr. Argyrios Karavelis	Head of Medical Services
(Greece) Dr. Giorgos Ziogas	Toccupational physiologist
(Greece) Irini Rera	Psychologist
(Greece) Ioanna Paspala	Nutritionist
(Greece) Stavros Terzanidis	U19 Physiotherapist
(Greece) Konstantinos Michailidis	U17 Physiotherapist
(Greece) Michail Kostidis	U15 Physiotherapist

Source: PAOK F.C.

== Players ==
=== PAOK U19 ===
Note: Flags indicate national team as defined under FIFA eligibility rules; some limited exceptions apply. Players may hold more than one non-FIFA nationality.

No.	Pos.	Nation	Player
1	GK	GRE	Spiros Aggelidis
2	DF	GRE	Vasilis Kitsakis
3	DF	GRE	Nikos Deligiannis
4	DF	GRE	Giorgos Tsiakoumis
5	DF	GRE	Theodoros Melenikiotis
6	MF	GRE	Dimitris Kottas
10	MF	GRE	Thodoros Kalogiros
11	FW	GRE	Lampros Smyrlis
12	FW	GRE	Loukas Martos
14	FW	GRE	Nikos Spyrakos

No.	Pos.	Nation	Player
15	GK	GRE	Alexandros Lypiridis
16	MF	RUS	Viktor Rumyantsev
18	MF	GRE	Kostas Goumas
20	FW	GRE	Xristos Iordanidis
21	DF	GRE	Lefteris Tasiouras
22	DF	GRE	Kostas Kastidis
24	GK	GRE	Dimitris Monastirlis
23	DF	ALB	Marios Sinanaj
25	MF	GRE	Athanasios Garnetas
27	FW	GRE	Thodoros Spyridopoulos

=== PAOK U17 ===
Note: Flags indicate national team as defined under FIFA eligibility rules; some limited exceptions apply. Players may hold more than one non-FIFA nationality.

No.	Pos.	Nation	Player
—	GK	GRE	Evaggelos Ikonomidis
—	GK	ROU	Vasili Sova
—	DF	GRE	Tryfon Kalioglou
—	DF	GRE	Giorgos Koupenos
—	DF	GRE	Giorgos Chourdakis
—	DF	GRE	Kostas Skourtis
—	DF	GRE	Stavros Iliadis
—	DF	GRE	Charalabos Georgiadis
—	DF	GRE	Panagiotis Theodosiadis
—	DF	GRE	Taxiarxis Filon
—	DF	GRE	Vasilis Pasachidis
—	MF	GRE	Vasilis Papageorgiou
—	MF	POL	Maximilian Sznaucner
—	MF	GRE	Panagiotis Deliopoulos

No.	Pos.	Nation	Player
—	MF	GRE	Dimitris Papaevaggelou
—	MF	GRE	Stefanos Aleiferopoulos
—	MF	GRE	Dimitris Vagionas
—	MF	ALB	Marios Leka
—	MF	GRE	Stelios Almasidis
—	FW	GRE	Nikos Mavris
—	FW	GRE	Kostas Ignatiou
—	FW	GRE	Vasilis Soupiadis
—	FW	GRE	Manolis Ibraim
—	FW	GRE	Ioannis Gitersos
—	FW	GRE	Grigoris Politakis
—	FW	GRE	Minas Vasiliadis
—	FW	GRE	Alexandros Adam
—	FW	GRE	Giorgos Ganopoulos

=== PAOK U15 ===
Note: Flags indicate national team as defined under FIFA eligibility rules; some limited exceptions apply. Players may hold more than one non-FIFA nationality.

No.	Pos.	Nation	Player
—	GK	GRE	Michail Pourliotopoulos
—	GK	GRE	Giorgos Panagiotidis
—	GK	GRE	Efstathios Beleris
—	GK	GRE	Klimis Kyriakidis
—	DF	GRE	Giorgos Kosidis
—	DF	GRE	Konstantinos Vyrsokinos
—	DF	GRE	Pavlos Tsiotas
—	DF	GRE	Dimitris Bataoulas
—	DF	GRE	Dimosthenis Kakoulis
—	DF	GRE	Pavlos Bagios
—	DF	GRE	Dimitris Sellas
—	MF	GRE	Anestis Mythou
—	MF	GRE	Efstratios Tachmetzidis
—	MF	GRE	Athanasios Panos

No.	Pos.	Nation	Player
—	MF	GRE	Vasilis Eleftheriadis
—	MF	ALB	Fotis Vasili
—	MF	ALB	Bedri Dunga
—	MF	GRE	Athanasios Papanikolaou
—	MF	GRE	Nikos Dimopoulos
—	MF	GRE	Ilias Drigakis
—	FW	GRE	Nikos Theofilou
—	FW	GRE	Giorgos Romanidis
—	FW	GRE	Ilias Karagiozis
—	FW	GRE	Andreas Spyrou
—	FW	GRE	Dimitris Berdos
—	FW	GRE	Ioannis Tsifoutis
—	FW	GRE	Antonis-Panagiotis Tsitsilas
—	FW	GRE	Petros Karakostas

== Honours ==
Titles won and honours by the PAOK academy's teams.

=== Official Youth Championship's - International Tournaments ===
PAOK U20

- Greek Superleague U19
  - Winners (8) : 2002–03, 2006–07, 2013–14, 2017–18, 2018–19, 2019–20, 2020–21, 2025–26
  - Runners-up (4) : 2011–12, 2015–16, 2022–23, 2023–24
- Superleague Cup
  - Winners (2) : 2025, 2026
- Double
  - Winners (1) : 2026,
- 'Broersen International Youth Tournament U-19'
- Culemborg Cup
  - Winners (1) : 2018-19
  - Runners-up (1) : 2012-13

PAOK U17

- Greek Superleague U17
  - Winners (6) : 2012–13, 2015–16, 2019–20, 2021–22, 2023–24, 2024-25
  - Runners-up (3) : 2014–15, 2018–19, 2022–23
- 'International Youth Tournament U-17'
- Craig Brown Memorial Trophy
  - Winners (1) :2025-26

PAOK U15

- Greek Superleague U15
  - Winners (6) : 2014–15, 2016–17, 2018–19, 2022–23, 2023–24, 2024-25
  - Runners-up (3) : 2013–14, 2015–16, 2021–22
- 'International Youth Tournament U-15'
- Universal Youth Cup
  - Winners (1) : 2025-26
- International Viktor Ponedelnik's Cup
  - Winners (1) : 2014-15
- Rimini Cup
  - Winners (2) : 2013-14, 2001–02
- «We Love Football» tournament
  - Runners-up (1) : 2015-16

=== Domestic - International tournaments Under ===
PAOK U14

- International Children’s Football Festival
  - Winners (1) : 2015-16

PAOK U13

- TSC International Tournament
  - Winners (1) : 2025-26
- Lennart Johansson Academy Trophy
  - Winners (2) : 2012-13, 2016–17
  - Runners-up : 2015
- Panagiotis Katsouris" Football tournament
  - Winners (2) : 2013-14, 2014–15
- CVV Zwervers
  - Runners-up : 2013-14
- Lukoil Cup
  - Winners (2) : 2013-14, 2016-17
- Rodos Knights Cup
  - Winners (1) : 2014-15
- Pfingst Cup
  - Runners-up : 2016-17

PAOK U12

- Marc Overmars
  - Winners (1) : 2015-16

PAOK U11

- Lokoball
  - Winners (2) : 2012-13, 2013–14
  - Runners-up : 2015, 2016
- Panagiotis Katsouris" Football tournament
  - Winners (1) : 2014
- 1 SANDANSKI CUP
  - Winners (1) : 2013-14
- 1 Invitational Cup Stockholm
  - Winners (1) : 2014-15
- 1 Catnic Cup*
  - Winners (1) : 2016
- 1 Paris World Cup
  - Winners (1) : 2015-16
- 1 Max Sport Youth Cup
  - Winners (1) : 2014-15

PAOK U10

- 1 International tournaments Serbia
  - Winners (1) : 2013-14
- IV International Football Tournament «Mini Football Magic
- **Winners (1) : 2015

International Orthopaedikos U10 Juniors Cup 2016

  - Runners-up : 2016

PAOK U9

- Pfingst Cup
- **Winners (1) : 2013-14
- International Tournaments Krnjevo
- **Winners (1) : 2014
- 2 Dragan Mance Cup
- **Winners (1) : 2017

PAOK U8

- Olympico Paphos Tournament
- **Winners (1) : 2017
- Germany Offenbach Tournament
- **Winners (1) : 2017

== Records ==
=== Top Scorers (All competitions) ===
Ranking	Nationality	Name	Years	Goals
1	Greece	Alexandros Gargalatzidis	2016–2019	29
2	Greece	Giorgos Doumtsis	2016–2020	28
3	Greece	Georgios Tzovaras	2016–2019	23
4	Greece	Zisis Chatzistravos	2016–2019	22
5	Greece	Dimitrios Panidis	2018–2021	22

=== Appearances (All competitions) ===
Ranking	Nationality	Name	Years	Appearances
1	Greece	Zisis Chatzistravos	2016–2019	84
2	Greece	Georgios Tzovaras	2016–2019	74
3	Greece	Theocharis Tsingaras	2017–2020	71
4	Greece	Giorgos Doumtsis	2016–2020	71
5	Greece	Giannis Michailidis	2017–2020	70

== Notable players ==
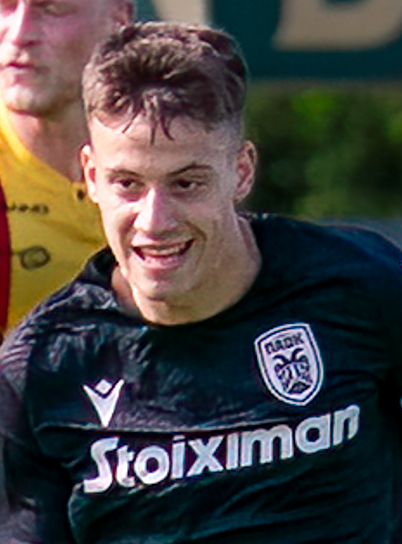
Giannis Konstantelias

Notable players coming from the club's youth departments include:

- Leandros Symeonidis
- Giorgos Koudas
- Koulis Apostolidis
- Filotas Pellios
- Angelos Anastasiadis
- Kostas Orfanos
- Nikos Alavantas
- Charis Baniotis
- Kyriakos Alexandridis
- Stefanos Borbokis
- Giorgos Toursounidis
- Vangelis Nastos
- Dimitris Salpingidis
- Georgios Fotakis
- Christos Karypidis
- Lazaros Christodoulopoulos
- Stefanos Athanasiadis
- Kostas Stafylidis
- Ergys Kaçe
- Stelios Kitsiou
- Dimitrios Pelkas
- Efthymis Koulouris
- Giannis Michailidis
- Lefteris Lyratzis
- Theocharis Tsingaras
- Christos Tzolis
- Georgios Koutsias
- Konstantinos Koulierakis
- Giannis Konstantelias
- Stefanos Tzimas
- Dimitris Chatsidis

== Top transfer sales ==
Pos.	Player	To	Fee	Date	Notes	Source(s)
MF	Giannis Konstantelias	(Germany) Borussia Dortmund	€26,000,000	17 August 2026	Plus 6 million bonus target	
FW	Stefanos Tzimas	(Germany) 1. FC Nürnberg	€18,000,000	3 February 2025	Plus €3.75m from next sale	
DF	Konstantinos Koulierakis	(Germany) VfL Wolfsburg	€11,750,000	30 August 2024	Plus 3 million bonus target	
FW	Christos Tzolis	(England) Norwich City	€11,000,000	12 August 2021	Plus €600k from next sale	
FW	Efthymis Koulouris	(France) Toulouse	€3,500,000	22 June 2019		
FW	Georgios Koutsias	(United States) Chicago Fire	€2,360,000	28 February 2023		
FW	Lazaros Christodoulopoulos	(Greece) Panathinaikos	€2,200,000	26 June 2008		
MF	Dimitrios Pelkas	(Turkey) Fenerbahçe	€2,200,000	5 October 2020		
FW	Dimitris Salpingidis	(Greece) Panathinaikos	€1,800,000	17 August 2006	Plus 3 Panathinaikos players	
DF	Kostas Stafylidis	(Germany) Bayer Leverkusen	€1,500,000	25 July 2012		
DF	Christos Karypidis	(Scotland) Hearts	€478,000	3 August 2006		
GK	Nikolaos Botis	(Italy) Inter Milan (Youth)	€350,000	1 September 2020		
DF	Stelios Kitsiou	(Turkey) Ankaragücü	€300,000	21 July 2019		
MF	Theocharis Tsingaras	(France) Toulouse	€300,000	1 September 2022	Loan fee	
