= Superleague Greece Youth Leagues =

Football competitions in Greece

The Superleague Greece Youth Leagues is a system of youth football leagues that are managed, organised and controlled by the Super League. Youth Leagues are the organizational events involving the superleague clubs' infrastructure teams. It was established in 2002 as a single category, and in 2008 it split into two, until 2013 to three age levels. Previously known as the "Amateur Championship".

== Leagues ==
In each league they participate Infrastructure teams of Super League's clubs. A team may become a champion in any of the infrastructure championships, but not participate in the next year's championship if the first team is relegated.

=== History ===
- 2001–2002: First season, a single division with the 2001–2002 National Division A teams and the name "Youth Championship". It was maintained until the 2005–2006 season.
- 2006–2007: Super League Greece SYN.P.E. undertakes the organization of the championship under the name "Super League Youth Under 21".
- 2008–2009: The "Youth" designation is removed, and the league is called the "Under-21 (U-21) Super League". The second competition is also created, the "Super League under 18 (K–18)" championship.
- 2009–2010: The age limit in the second division drops from 18 to 17 years and is renamed "Super League K–17".
- 2010–2011: The age limit in the first division drops from 21 to 20 years and is renamed "Super League K–20".
- 2013–2014: The third competition, the “Super League under 15 (K–15)” championship, is created.
- 2018–2019: the age limit in the first division drops from 20 to 19 years and is renamed "Super League K–19".

=== Superleague under 19 ===
It takes place in a single group. Any team taking the first place at the end of the season become a champion. The schedule is common to the Super League's championship.

=== Superleague under 17 ===
It takes place in two groups, where the teams are placed with geographical criteria. The first two teams of each group qualify for the final stage, which takes place in a court with knockout matches (semi-finals and final).

=== Superleague under 15 ===
It takes place in two groups, where the teams are placed with geographical criteria. The first team of each group qualify to the final, which takes place on a neutral stadium. The winner being a champion. Participation in this category is optional.

== Champions by season and age division ==
=== Superleague U19 ===
Season	Champion	
2001–02	Youth	Aris
2002–03	Youth	PAOK U20
2003–04	Youth	Olympiacos
2004–05	Youth	Panathinaikos
2005–06	Youth	Xanthi
2006–07	U21	PAOK U20
2007–08	U21	Xanthi
2008–09	U21	Xanthi
2009–10	U21	Olympiacos
2010–11	U20	Aris
2011–12	U20	Panathinaikos
2012–13	U20	Olympiacos
2013–14	U20	PAOK U20
2014–15	U20	Olympiacos
2015–16	U20	Olympiacos
2016–17	U20	Olympiacos
2017–18	U20	PAOK U20
2018–19	U20	PAOK U20
2019–20	U20	PAOK U20
2020–21	U19	PAOK U20
2021–22	U19	Panathinaikos
2022–23	U19	Olympiacos
2023–24	U19	Olympiacos
2024–25	U19	Olympiacos
2025–26	U19	PAOK U20

=== Superleague U17 ===
Season	Champion	
2008–09	U18	Panathinaikos
2009–10	U17	Olympiacos
2010–11	U17	Olympiacos
2011–12	U17	Aris
2012–13	U17	PAOK U17
2013–14	U17	Xanthi
2014–15	U17	Olympiacos
2015–16	U17	PAOK U17
2016–17	U17	Olympiacos
2017–18	U17	Olympiacos
2018–19	U17	Olympiacos
2019–20	U17	PAOK U17
2020–21	U17	not held
2021–22	U17	PAOK U17
2022–23	U17	Olympiacos
2023–24	U17	PAOK U17
2024–25	U17	PAOK U17
2025–26	U17	Panathinaikos

=== Superleague U15 ===
Season	Champion	
2013–14	U15	Olympiacos
2014–15	U15	PAOK U15
2015–16	U15	Olympiacos
2016–17	U15	PAOK U15
2017–18	U15	Panathinaikos
2018–19	U15	PAOK U15
2019–20	U15	Olympiacos
2020–21	U15	not held
2021–22	U15	Olympiacos
2022–23	U15	PAOK U15
2023–24	U15	PAOK U15
2024–25	U15	PAOK U15
2025–26	U15	PAOK U15

== Honours by club ==
=== U19–21 (Elite Youth Level) ===
Club	Honours	Season
Olympiacos	9	2004, 2010, 2013, 2015, 2016, 2017, 2023, 2024, 2025
PAOK U20	8	2003, 2007, 2014, 2018, 2019, 2020, 2021, 2026
Xanthi	3	2006, 2008, 2009
Panathinaikos	3	2005, 2012, 2022
Aris	2	2002, 2011

=== U17–18 (Advanced Youth Level) ===
Club	Honours	Season
Olympiacos	7	2010, 2011, 2015, 2017, 2018, 2019, 2023
PAOK U17	6	2013, 2016, 2020, 2022, 2024, 2025
Panathinaikos	2	2009, 2026
Aris	1	2012
Xanthi	1	2014

=== U15 (Early Youth Level) ===
Club	Honours	Season
PAOK U15	7	2015, 2017, 2019, 2023, 2024, 2025, 2026
Olympiacos	4	2014, 2016, 2020, 2022
Panathinaikos	1	2018
