= Gate 4 =

Supporters group of PAOK

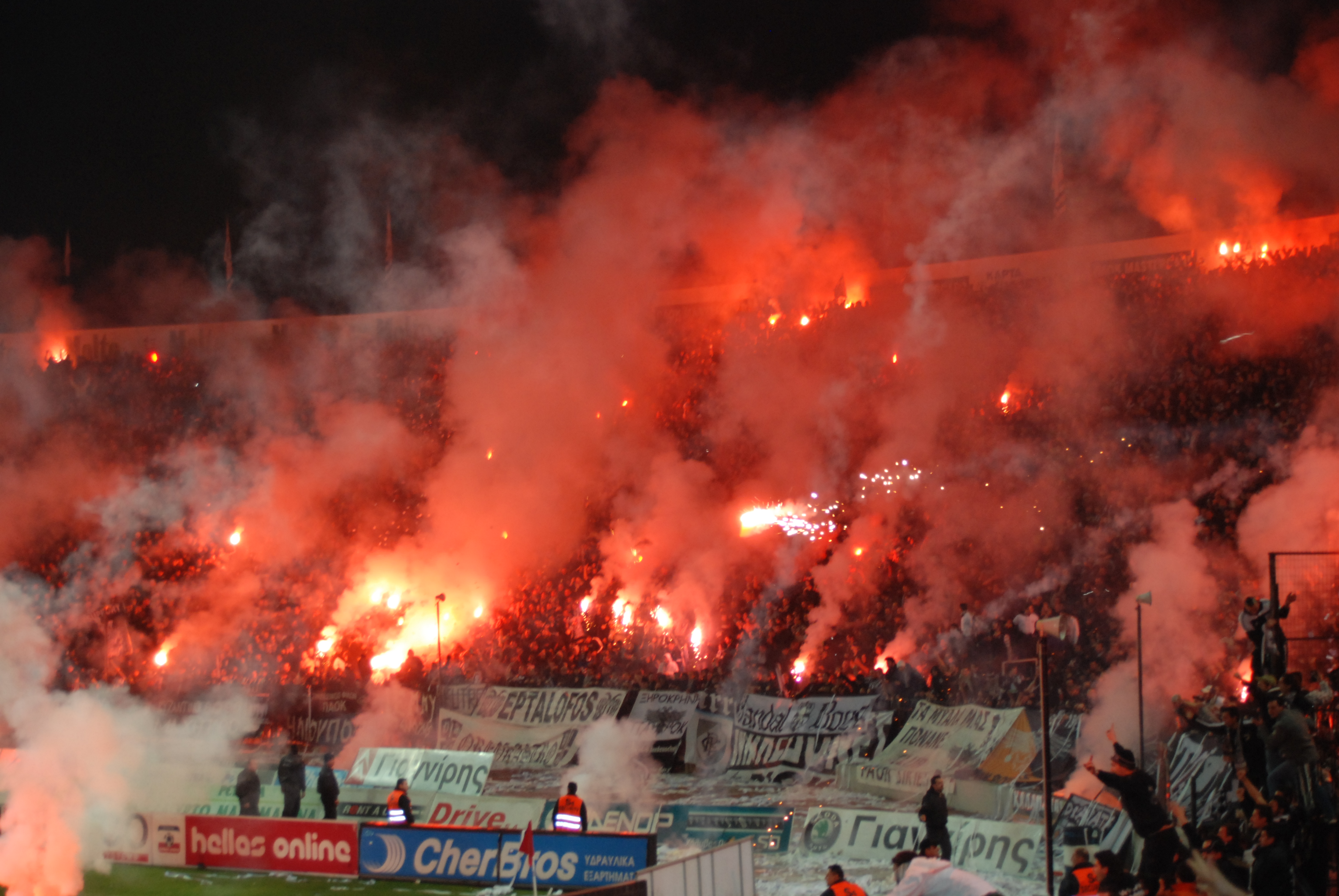
- Type: Supporters, Ultras group
- Headquarters: Thessaloniki, Greece
- Established: 1976
- Club: PAOK
- Motto: Εμείς μαζί για μια ζωή (Τogether for a lifetime)

Gate 4 (Greek: Θύρα 4) is the most popular organized supporters group of the Greek multi-sports club PAOK. The group has played an important role in the club's course over the years affecting the club's decisions. They mostly wear black and white symbols and clothes, which are the colors of the club. Gate 4 is considered as one of the most militant fan organisations in all of Europe.

== History ==
=== Background ===
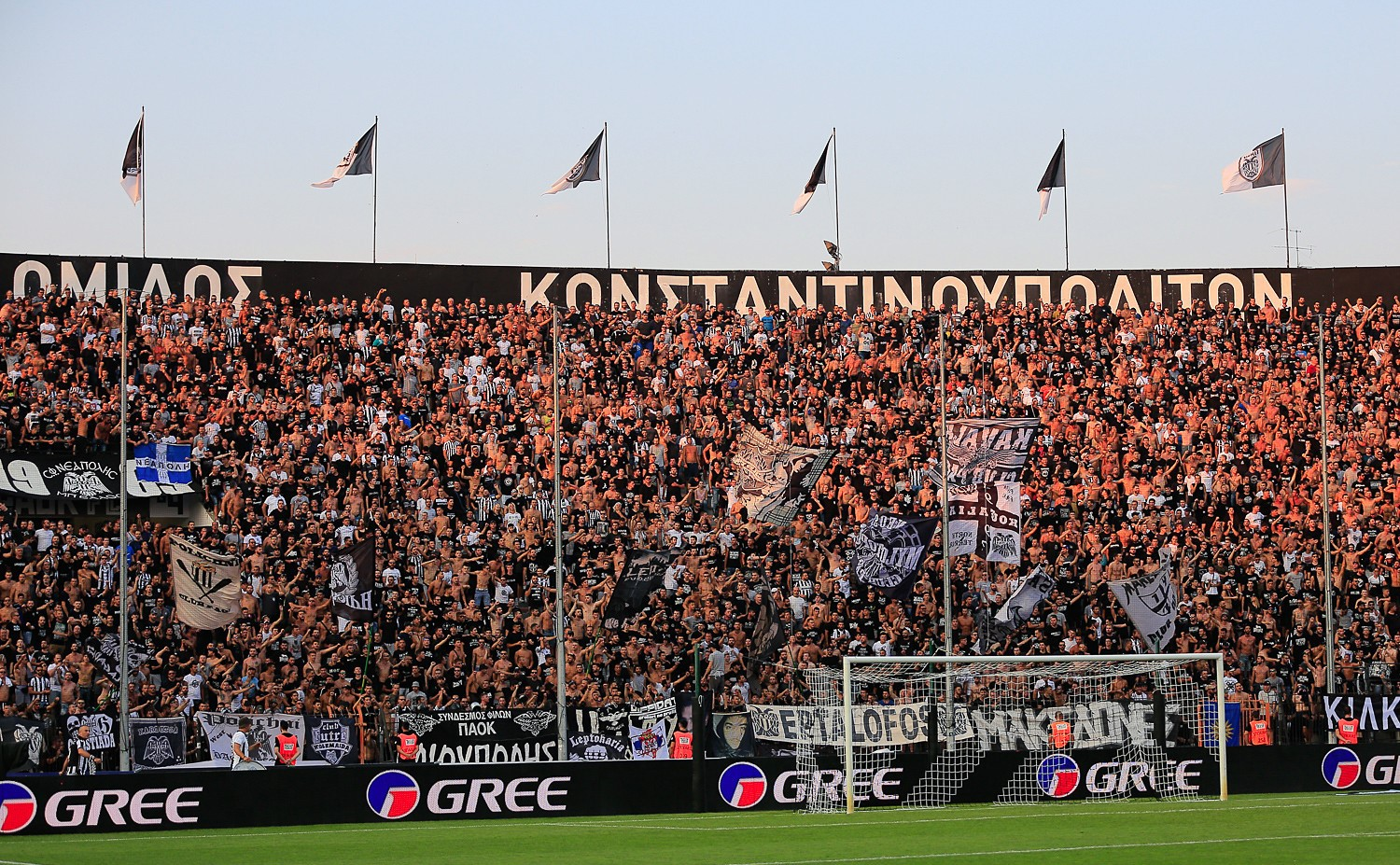
PAOK fans in Gate 4 of Toumba Stadium

PAOK always had great support from fans all over Greece. Before the foundation of Gate 4 there were various football supporters' clubs all around Greece. PAOK's first fan association was the club from Neapoli district of Thessaloniki, founded in 1963 and considered one of the oldest in Europe. Gate 4 officially founded on 25 September 1976, but operated unofficially from April of the same year, taking its name from the homonymous 4th gate of the Toumba Stadium, from where PAOK's hard-core fans watched the games. The organized supporters' movement of PAOK counts over 120 groups in various parts of the world, in Greece, Cyprus, Australia, Belgium, United States, Germany, Sweden and Switzerland. The headquarters of the organization is the so-called "Low-ceilinged", located on 39, Palaion Patron Germanos street in Thessaloniki.

Toumba Stadium, home stadium of PAOK, is infamous for its hostile atmosphere, a factor that led to the attribution of the Stadium as "The Black Hell". On high-profile encounters, when the players walk out of the tunnel, the song Hells Bells by AC/DC is heard from the stadium's speakers. Also, one of the biggest banners in the world was created by Michaniona fan club.

Over the years, Gate 4 has openly expressed opposition to some of the club's managements. The most famous dispute was with former owner of the club, Thomas Voulinos. This dispute intensified on 1 October 1992, when PAOK faced Paris Saint-Germain for the UEFA Cup. The match was abandoned due to crowd violence and PAOK were punished with a two-year ban from all European competitions by the UEFA disciplinary committee. The sentence was later reduced to one year. Voulinos blamed the leader of Gate 4, Antonis Kladas, of being the instigate of the riots, whom he sued him. Finally, after several years, Kladas was acquitted in Greek courts.

No 12 jersey is dedicated to the fans, the symbolic 12th man on the pitch. It was permanently retired by the club on 16 August 2000.

On 24 February 2022, during the match against Midtjylland for the UEFA Europa Conference League, a banner raised for 30 minutes, expressing solidarity with the accused murderers of the 19 years old supporter of rival team Aris, Alkis Kampanos. This act was criticized by most of PAOK supporters, but also by the management of the club, which issued an official statement condemning the incident.

=== Vale of Tempe tragedy (1999) ===
On 3 October 1999, some 3,000 PAOK fans attended the Olympic Stadium of Athens for an away match against Panathinaikos for the Greek League. On its way back to Thessaloniki, the double-decker bus of the fan club of Kordelio district collided with a truck and fell into a ditch in the Vale of Tempe, Thessaly. The aftermath of the bus crash was devastating. Six PAOK fans lost their lives (Kyriakos Lazaridis, Christina Tziova, Anastasios Themelis, Charalampos Zapounidis, Georgios Ganatsios, Dimitris Andreadakis) and many others were injured. A roadside memorial, which is engraved with the names of the 6 people who died in the accident, was erected at the site of the crash bearing the following inscription: "Their love for PAOK brought them here, left them here and went beyond".

=== Romania minibus crash (2026) ===
Seven supporters of PAOK (Thanasis Gouzouris, Christos Zezios, Vachos Moldovanof, Giorgos Kesanidis, Vasilis Palo, Kostas Markopoulos, Dimitris Maronitis) were killed and three others injured in a minibus crash in western Romania while traveling to Lyon for a UEFA Europa League match. The accident occurred on DN6 (Drumul Național 6), a single-carriageway connecting western Romania, during an overnight journey. The group consisted of 10 supporters en route to the Lyon v PAOK match scheduled for Thursday evening.

The injured were initially taken to a hospital in Lugoj and later transferred to the county hospital in Timișoara. One sustained minor injuries, another suffered non-serious fractures, and a third incurred multiple fractures, including injuries to the neck and spine, though medical staff reported that his life was not in danger. Following the crash, approximately 200 PAOK supporters who had traveled to Romania gathered outside the Timișoara hospital for information and subsequently canceled their trip to France. PAOK supporters held a vigil at Toumba Stadium in Thessaloniki, where flags were flown at half-mast.

The Greek government confirmed the deaths and stated that it was coordinating with Romanian authorities through the Greek embassy to provide assistance to the victims’ families and the injured. PAOK officials traveled to Romania to support those affected, and messages of condolence were issued by the club, rival Greek teams, and Olympique Lyonnais. Lyon announced that a tribute would be held during the Europa League match, and the section reserved for visiting PAOK supporters was closed at the request of the club and supporters’ groups.

== Friendships ==
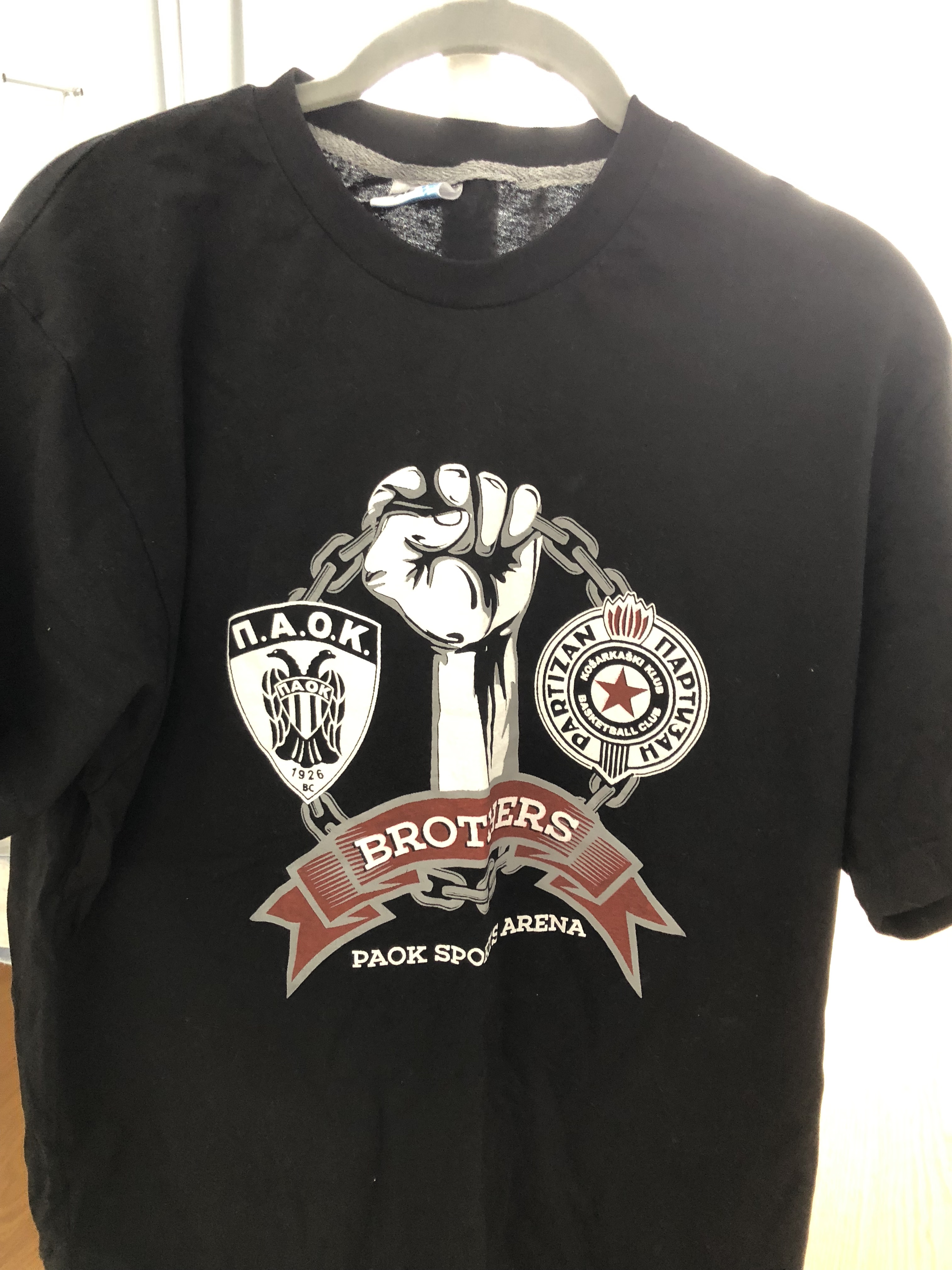

PAOK supporters' groups consider Grobari, the organized supporters group of the Serbian football club Partizan Belgrade a friendly group. On many occasions, fans from both clubs traveled to watch each other's games. They also maintain good relations with the fans of Russian CSKA Moscow, CSKA Sofia, Steaua Bucharest and Widzew Lodz.

PAOK fans also have good relations with the fans of OFI, a friendship that started in 1986 when OFI's fans founded the organized fanbase under the same rituals as with PAOK's (same naming, and mostly because both clubs have many similarities). In October 1987, when OFI faced Atalanta for the UEFA Cup Winners' Cup at Toumba Stadium, fans from both Gate 4 counterparts supported the Cretans. A mutual respect also exists between PAOK and Panionios fans.

== Rivalries ==
The rivalry between Olympiacos and PAOK, is long-standing, emerging in the 1960s, when Olympiacos unsuccessfully tried to acquire Giorgos Koudas from PAOK, approaching him directly without going into a negotiation with his club.

A long-time rivalry also exists between PAOK and local rivals Aris.

Panathinaikos and AEK, Athens' two big clubs, are also considered major rivals.
