= Nea Mesimvria =

Nea Mesimvria Νέα Μεσημβρία
- Community
- Location within Greece
- Coordinates: 40°45′05″N 22°46′15″E
- Country: Greece
- Administrative region: Central Macedonia
- Regional unit: Thessaloniki
- Municipality: Chalkidona
- Municipal unit: Agios Athanasios

Population (2021)
  - Community: 2,303
- Time zone: UTC+2 (EET)
  - Summer (DST): UTC+3 (EEST)

Nea Mesimvria (Greek: Νέα Μεσημβρία) is a village in the western suburbs of Thessaloniki, Greece. It is part of the municipality Chalkidona. Its population was 2,303 in 2021.
