= 1973–74 PAOK FC season =

PAOK
1973–74 season
- President: Ioannis Arvanitakis
- Manager: Les Shannon
- Stadium: Toumba Stadium
- Alpha Ethniki: 4th
- Greek Cup: Winners
- UEFA Cup Winners' Cup: Quarter-finals
- Greater Greece Cup: Winners
- Top goalscorer: League: Achilleas Aslanidis (16); All: Achilleas Aslanidis (21)
- Highest home attendance: 43,882 vs Milan

The 1973–74 season was PAOK Football Club's 48th in existence and the club's 15th consecutive season in the top flight of Greek football. The team entered the Greek Football Cup in first round, and also participated in the UEFA Cup Winners' Cup reaching the quarter-finals.

== Players ==
=== Squad ===
Note: Flags indicate national team as defined under FIFA eligibility rules; some limited exceptions apply. Players may hold more than one non-FIFA nationality.

No.	Pos.	Nation	Player
—	GK	GRE	Ioannis Stefas
—	GK	GRE	Savvas Chatzioannou
—	GK	GRE	Apostolos Savvoulidis
—	DF	GRE	Kostas Iosifidis
—	DF	GRE	Ioannis Gounaris
—	DF	GRE	Filotas Pellios
—	DF	GRE	Aristos Fountoukidis
—	DF	GRE	Babis Tsilingiridis
—	DF	GRE	Ioannis Chatziantoniou
—	DF	GRE	Pavlos Papadopoulos
—	DF	GRE	Christos Kalifoulis

No.	Pos.	Nation	Player
—	MF	GRE	Giorgos Koudas (captain)
—	MF	GRE	Koulis Apostolidis
—	MF	GRE	Stavros Sarafis
—	MF	GRE	Christos Terzanidis
—	MF	GRE	Vasilis Lazos
—	MF	GRE	Angelos Anastasiadis
—	FW	GRE	Achilleas Aslanidis
—	FW	GRE	Dimitris Paridis
—	FW	GRE	Panagiotis Kermanidis
—	FW	GRE	Dimitris Panagis
—	FW	GRE	Lefteris Tsakiropoulos

== Transfers ==
Players transferred in

Transfer Window	Pos.	Name	Club	Fee
Summer	FW	(Greece) Panagiotis Kermanidis	(Hungary) MTK	1 million Ft.

Players transferred out

Transfer Window	Pos.	Name	Club	Fee
Summer	FW	(Greece) Giannis Mantzourakis	(Greece) AEL	Free
Summer	FW	(Greece) Dimitris Stavridis	(Greece) Aris	Free

== Pre-season ==
Win Draw Loss

19 August 1973 Friendly	Lassani	1–9	PAOK	Kozani
	Kaprinis		Sarafis; Paridis; Koudas; Fountoukidis; Fragakis

21 August 1973 Friendly	Kastoria	1–1	PAOK	Kastoria
	Kessidis 37'		Sarafis 76'

22 August 1973 Friendly	Kozani	2–5	PAOK	Kozani
	Deligiorgidis 41'; Lazongas 71'		Sarafis 9', 25', 38'; Paridis 41'; Anastasiadis 48'	Referee: Tsantakis

24 August 1973 Friendly	Makedonikos Siatista	0–2	PAOK	Siatista
			Tsakiropoulos; Lazos

26 August 1973 Friendly	PAOK	2–2	Nacional Montevideo	Thessaloniki
	Iosifidis 3'; Aslanidis 73'		Masnik 65'; Mamelli 89'	Stadium: Toumba Stadium

29 August 1973 Friendly	PAOK	1–1	Dinamo București	Thessaloniki
	Paridis 41'		Radu 39'	Stadium: Toumba Stadium

4 September 1973 Friendly	Kickers Offenbach	2–2	PAOK	Hesse, West Germany
	Kostedde 5'; Bihn 46'		Aslanidis 19', 48'

6 September 1973 Friendly	VfB 1900 Offenbach	1–3	PAOK	Hesse, West Germany
	Meissner 60'		Aslanidis 41'; Paridis 43'; Tsilingiridis 63'

7 September 1973 Friendly	KSV Hessen Kassel	3–2	PAOK	Hesse, West Germany
			Aslanidis

9 September 1973 Friendly	PAOK	4–1	AEL	Thessaloniki
	Panagis 23'; Paridis 39'; Tsilingiridis 65'; Iosifidis 69'		Mantzourakis 60' (pen.)	Stadium: Toumba Stadium; Referee: Tsolakidis

11 September 1973 Friendly	PAOK	1–1	Kickers Offenbach	Thessaloniki
				Stadium: Toumba Stadium

13 September 1973 Friendly	PAOK	0–0	Kastoria	Thessaloniki
				Stadium: Toumba Stadium; Referee: Velissarios

15 September 1973 Friendly	PAOK	3–1	AEK Athens	Thessaloniki
	Sarafis 24', 90'; Paridis 64'		Papaioannou 20'	Stadium: Toumba Stadium; Referee: Martinis

== Competitions ==
=== Overview ===
Competition	Record							
Competition	Pld	W	D	L	GF	GA	GD	Win %
Alpha Ethniki	34	16	11	7	62	32	+30	47.06
Greek Cup	6	5	1	0	20	5	+15	83.33
UEFA Cup Winners' Cup	6	2	3	1	11	9	+2	33.33
Greater Greece Cup	2	1	1	0	4	3	+1	50.00
Total	48	24	16	8	97	49	+48	50.00

Source: Competitions

== Alpha Ethniki ==
=== Standings ===
Pos	Team	Pld	W	D	L	GF	GA	GD	Pts	Qualification or relegation
2	Panathinaikos	34	24	6	4	76	27	+49	54	Qualification for UEFA Cup first round
3	Aris	34	21	6	7	49	29	+20	48	Qualification for UEFA Cup first round
4	PAOK	34	16	11	7	62	32	+30	43	Qualification for Cup Winners' Cup first round
5	AEK Athens	34	16	8	10	53	36	+17	40	
6	Panachaiki	34	13	12	9	42	37	+5	38	

Source: RSSSF
Rules for classification: 1st points; 2nd decision match; 3rd head-to-head goal difference.

==== Results summary ====
Overall								Home						Away					
Pld	W	D	L	GF	GA	GD	Pts	W	D	L	GF	GA	GD	W	D	L	GF	GA	GD
34	16	11	7	62	32	+30	59	12	3	2	42	10	+32	4	8	5	20	22	−2

Last updated: 19 June 1974.
Source: Competitive matches

==== Results by round ====
Round	1	2	3	4	5	6	7	8	9	10	11	12	13	14	15	16	17	18	19	20	21	22	23	24	25	26	27	28	29	30	31	32	33	34
Ground	A	A	H	A	H	A	H	A	H	H	A	H	A	H	A	H	A	H	H	A	H	A	H	A	H	A	A	H	A	H	A	H	A	H
Result	W	L	W	W	D	D	W	W	W	W	L	L	W	W	D	W	D	W	W	D	W	L	L	D	W	D	D	W	L	W	D	D	L	D
Position	4	10	6	6	5	6	6	5	4	3	4	4	4	4	4	4	4	4	4	4	4	4	4	4	4	4	4	4	4	4	4	4	4	4

Source: League matches
A = Away; H = Home; W = Win; D = Draw; L = Loss

==== Matches ====
Win Draw Loss

23 September 1973 1	APOEL	2–3	PAOK	Nicosia
	Timotheou 5'; Irodotou 38'		Sarafis 20', 26', 80'	Stadium: GSP Stadium (1902)

30 September 1973 2	Egaleo	3–1	PAOK	Athens
	Venetis 17', 86'; Chastalis 74' (pen.)		Fountoukidis 38'	Stadium: Stavros Mavrothalassitis Stadium; Referee: Sfyrlas

7 October 1973 3	PAOK	4–0	Fostiras	Thessaloniki
	Aslanidis 35', 68'; Koudas 76'; Sarafis 84'			Stadium: Toumba Stadium; Attendance: 15,949; Referee: Rammos

14 October 1973 4	Panserraikos	1–4	PAOK	Serres
	Kokkoris 17'		Aslanidis 18'; Koudas 30'; Paridis 74'; Gounaris 85'	Stadium: Serres Municipal Stadium

21 October 1973 5	PAOK	1–1	Panathinaikos	Thessaloniki
	Aslanidis 53'		Kampas 44' (pen.)	Stadium: Toumba Stadium; Attendance: 42,318; Referee: Armodoros

29 October 1973 6	Iraklis	1–1	PAOK	Thessaloniki
	Sentelidis 59'		Koudas 35'	Stadium: Kaftanzoglio Stadium; Attendance: 20,309

4 November 1973 7	PAOK	3–1	Ethnikos Piraeus	Thessaloniki
	Aslanidis 2'; Sarafis 4', 85' (pen.)		Kyriakou 75'	Stadium: Toumba Stadium

11 November 1973 8	Apollon Kalamaria	1–2	PAOK	Thessaloniki
	Travlos 54'		Garyfallou 11' (o.g.); Zacharopoulos 49' (o.g.)	Stadium: Kalamaria Stadium

2 December 1973 9	PAOK	3–0	AEK Athens	Thessaloniki
	Paridis 55'; Terzanidis 64'; Aslanidis 65'			Stadium: Toumba Stadium; Attendance: 26,426

9 December 1973 10	PAOK	3–0	Panionios	Thessaloniki
	Kermanidis 29'; Sarafis 59'; Terzanidis 73'			Stadium: Toumba Stadium

16 December 1973 11	Olympiacos	3–0	PAOK	Piraeus
	Delikaris 70'; Triantafyllos 80'; Kritikopoulos 86'			Stadium: Karaiskakis Stadium; Attendance: 41,110

23 December 1973 12	PAOK	0–1	Aris	Thessaloniki
			Alexiadis 30'	Stadium: Toumba Stadium; Attendance: 41,428; Referee: Alexopoulos

30 December 1973 13	Apollon Athens	0–1	PAOK	Athens
			Paridis 14' (pen.)	Stadium: Rizoupoli Stadium

6 January 1974 14	PAOK	3–1	AEL	Thessaloniki
	Apostolidis 4'; Kermanidis 41'; Aslanidis 75'		Mantzourakis 24'	Stadium: Toumba Stadium; Referee: Kougias

13 January 1974 15	Panachaiki	1–1	PAOK	Patras
	Leventakos 47'		Pellios 78'	Stadium: Kostas Davourlis Stadium

20 January 1974 16	PAOK	2–0	Kavala	Thessaloniki
	Sarafis 43'; Pellios 80'			Stadium: Toumba Stadium; Attendance: 13,618

27 January 1974 17	Olympiacos Volos	2–2	PAOK	Volos
	Karaiskos 19' (pen.), 74' (pen.)		Aslanidis 3' (pen.), 22'	Stadium: Volos Municipal Stadium; Attendance: 7,798; Referee: Alexopoulos

3 February 1974 18	PAOK	4–1	APOEL	Thessaloniki
	Aslanidis 24' (pen.); Sarafis 38'; Paridis 46', 71'		Markou 86'	Stadium: Toumba Stadium; Referee: Doumousiaris

10 February 1974 19	PAOK	3–1	Egaleo	Thessaloniki
	Terzanidis 19'; Aslanidis 25'; Fountoukidis 66'		Lazarou 78'	Stadium: Toumba Stadium; Attendance: 20,555

17 February 1974 20	Fostiras	1–1	PAOK	Athens
	Panopoulos 43'		Paridis 33'	Stadium: Tavros Stadium; Attendance: 7,175; Referee: Doumousiaris

3 March 1974 21	PAOK	3–0	Panserraikos	Thessaloniki
	Aslanidis 22' (pen.); Kermanidis 84'; Apostolidis 89'			Stadium: Toumba Stadium; Attendance: 14,185; Referee: Voulgaris

10 March 1974 22	Panathinaikos	3–2	PAOK	Athens
	Domazos 28'; Grammos 34'; Verón 88'		Kermanidis 20'; Tsakiropoulos 87'	Stadium: Leoforos Stadium; Attendance: 24,877; Referee: Kyriakidis

17 March 1974 23	PAOK	1–2	Iraklis	Thessaloniki
	Paridis 89'		Gesios 17'; Nikoloudis 50'	Stadium: Toumba Stadium; Attendance: 7,200

24 March 1974 24	Ethnikos Piraeus	0–0	PAOK	Piraeus
				Stadium: Karaiskakis Stadium; Attendance: 9,105; Referee: Papazoglou

31 March 1974 25	PAOK	5–0	Apollon Kalamaria	Thessaloniki
	Paridis 4', 9', 74'; Sarafis 80'; Kermanidis 83'			Stadium: Toumba Stadium; Attendance: 11,086

7 April 1974 26	AEK Athens	0–0	PAOK	Athens
				Stadium: Nikos Goumas Stadium; Attendance: 17,549; Referee: Xanthos

15 April 1974 27	Panionios	1–1	PAOK	Athens
	Dedes 65'		Sarafis 23'	Stadium: Nea Smyrni Stadium; Referee: Amarantidis

21 April 1974 28	PAOK	1–0	Olympiacos	Thessaloniki
	Sarafis 61'			Stadium: Toumba Stadium; Attendance: 42,976

5 May 1974 29	Aris	1–0	PAOK	Thessaloniki
	Pallas 10'			Stadium: Kleanthis Vikelidis Stadium; Attendance: 22,100; Referee: Kreouzis

12 May 1974 30	PAOK	4–0	Apollon Athens	Thessaloniki
	Apostolidis 5'; Aslanidis 21', 43'; Kermanidis 67'			Stadium: Toumba Stadium; Attendance: 4,940

19 May 1974 31	AEL	1–1	PAOK	Larissa
	Mantzourakis 20'		Aslanidis 6'	Stadium: Alcazar Stadium

26 May 1974 32	PAOK	1–1	Panachaiki	Thessaloniki
	Fountoukidis 62'		Spyropoulos 20'	Stadium: Toumba Stadium; Attendance: 18,774; Referee: Vamvakopoulos

9 June 1974 33	Kavala	1–0	PAOK	Kavala
	Machairidis 22'			Stadium: Kavala Stadium

19 June 1974 34	PAOK	1–1	Olympiacos Volos	Thessaloniki
	Aslanidis 63'		Valachas 67'	Stadium: Toumba Stadium

== Greek Cup ==
=== First round ===
26 December 1973	PAOK	5–0	Kastoria	Thessaloniki
	Koudas 2', 25'; Terzanidis 15'; Kermanidis 81'; Paridis 84'			Stadium: Toumba Stadium

=== Second round ===
29 January 1974	PAOK	7–2	Moudania	Thessaloniki
	Aslanidis 2'; Paridis 3', 76'; Kermanidis 50'; Koudas 64', 72', 80'		Tsoplakis 26'; Konstantinidis 85' (pen.)	Stadium: Toumba Stadium; Attendance: 2,401

=== Third round ===
24 February 1974	PAOK	3–1	AEK Athens	Thessaloniki
	Paridis 27'; Aslanidis 50'; Sarafis 80' (pen.)		Nikolaou 38'	Stadium: Toumba Stadium; Attendance: 23,597; Referee: Zlatanos

=== Quarter–finals ===
10 April 1974	PAOK	2–0	Egaleo	Thessaloniki
	Kermanidis 44', 45'			Stadium: Toumba Stadium

=== Semi–finals ===
8 May 1974	Pierikos	0–1	PAOK	Thessaloniki
			Sarafis 88'	Stadium: Kaftanzoglio Stadium; Referee: Tsanaklidis

=== Final ===
16 June 1974	Olympiacos	2–2 (a.e.t.) (3–4 p)	PAOK	Athens
	Triantafyllos 19'; Karavitis (penalty missed) 66'; Kritikopoulos 79'		Paridis 50'; Aslanidis 72' (pen.)	Stadium: Nikos Goumas Stadium; Attendance: 26,402; Referee: Walter Hungerbühler (Switzerland)
	Penalties
	Papadimitriou (penalty scored); Poupakis (penalty missed); Persidis (penalty missed); Glezos (penalty scored); Siokos (penalty scored)		(penalty scored) Sarafis; (penalty scored) Paridis; (penalty missed) Koudas; (penalty scored) Anastasiadis; (penalty scored) Apostolidis

== UEFA Cup Winners' Cup ==
=== First round ===
19 September 1973 1st leg	Legia Warsaw (Poland)	1–1	(Greece) PAOK	Warsaw, Poland
	Pieszko 59'		Terzanidis 51'	Stadium: Polish Army Stadium; Attendance: 12,047; Referee: Josef Bucek (Austria)

3 October 1973 2nd leg	PAOK (Greece)	1–0 (2–1 agg.)	(Poland) Legia Warsaw	Thessaloniki, Greece
	Paridis 80'			Stadium: Toumba Stadium; Attendance: 28,795; Referee: Gheorge Limona (Romania)

=== Second round ===
24 October 1973 1st leg	Lyon (France)	3–3	(Greece) PAOK	Lyon, France
	Lacombe 10'; Di Nallo 51'; Ravier 67'		Aslanidis 45'; Terzanidis 50'; Sarafis 81'	Stadium: Stade de Gerland; Attendance: 26,250; Referee: Malcolm Wright (Northern Ireland)

7 November 1973 2nd leg	PAOK (Greece)	4–0 (7–3 agg.)	(France) Lyon	Thessaloniki, Greece
	Paridis 26', 61'; Aslanidis 38' (pen.); Terzanidis 83'			Stadium: Toumba Stadium; Attendance: 35,000; Referee: Sergio Gonella (Italy)

=== Quarter-finals ===
13 March 1974 1st leg	Milan (Italy)	3–0	(Greece) PAOK	Milan, Italy
	Bigon 13'; Benetti 38'; Chiarugi 86'			Stadium: San Siro; Attendance: 25,963; Referee: Paul Bonett (Malta)

20 March 1974 2nd leg	PAOK (Greece)	2–2 (2–5 agg.)	(Italy) Milan	Thessaloniki, Greece
	Sarafis 29', 72'		Bigon 54'; Tresoldi 78'	Stadium: Toumba Stadium; Attendance: 28,350; Referee: Vital Loraux (Belgium)

== Greater Greece Cup ==
21 September 1973 1st leg	Omonia	1–1	PAOK	Nicosia, Cyprus
	Gregory 48'		Panagis 18'	Stadium: GSP Stadium (1902)

14 November 1973 2nd leg	PAOK	3–2 (4–3 agg.)	Omonia	Thessaloniki, Greece
	Kermanidis 41' (pen.); Lazos 57'; Batis 82'		Tselepis 1'; Mouskos 88'	Stadium: Toumba Stadium

== Statistics ==
=== Squad statistics ===
As of June 19, 1974

Appearances denote players in the starting lineup, with the numbers in parentheses denoting appearances as substitute.

No.	Name	Alpha Ethniki		Greek Cup		UEFA CWC		Total	
No.	Name	Apps	Goals	Apps	Goals	Apps	Goals	Apps	Goals
Goalkeepers
	(Greece) Ioannis Stefas	22	0	3	0	4	0	29	0
	(Greece) Savvas Chatzioannou	9	0	3	0	2	0	14	0
	(Greece) Apostolos Savvoulidis	3	0	0	0	0	0	3	0
Defenders
	(Greece) Kostas Iosifidis	29	0	5	0	6	0	40	0
	(Greece) Filotas Pellios	29	2	5	0	6	0	40	2
	(Greece) Aristos Fountoukidis	25	3	5	0	5	0	35	3
	(Greece) Ioannis Gounaris	26	1	3	0	4	0	33	1
	(Greece) Babis Tsilingiridis	19	0	5	0	1	0	25	0
	(Greece) Ioannis Chatziantoniou	11	0	3	0	2	0	16	0
	(Greece) Pavlos Papadopoulos	7	0	1	0	1	0	9	0
	(Greece) Christos Kalifoulis	1	0	1	0	0	0	2	0
Midfielders
	(Greece) Koulis Apostolidis	32	3	5	0	5	0	42	3
	(Greece) Christos Terzanidis	29	3	6	1	6	3	41	7
	(Greece) Stavros Sarafis	28	12	4	2	6	3	38	17
	(Greece) Giorgos Koudas	26	3	6	5	3	0	35	8
	(Greece) Vasilis Lazos	14	0	3	0	5	0	22	0
	(Greece) Angelos Anastasiadis	10	0	3	0	0	0	13	0
Forwards
	(Greece) Achilleas Aslanidis	29	16	5	3	6	2	40	21
	(Greece) Dimitris Paridis	25	10	6	5	6	3	37	18
	(Greece) Panagiotis Kermanidis	22	6	4	4	3	0	29	10
	(Greece) Dimitris Panagis	11	0	1	0	0	0	12	0
	(Greece) Lefteris Tsakiropoulos	4	1	0	0	0	0	4	1

Source: Match reports in competitive matches, RSSSF

=== Goalscorers ===
Rank	No.	Pos.	Player	Alpha Ethniki	Greek Cup	UEFA CWC	Total
1		FW	(Greece) Achilleas Aslanidis	16	3	2	21
2		FW	(Greece) Dimitris Paridis	10	5	3	18
3		MF	(Greece) Stavros Sarafis	12	2	3	17
4		FW	(Greece) Panagiotis Kermanidis	6	4	0	10
5		MF	(Greece) Giorgos Koudas	3	5	0	8
6		MF	(Greece) Christos Terzanidis	3	1	3	7
7		MF	(Greece) Koulis Apostolidis	3	0	0	3
7		DF	(Greece) Aristos Fountoukidis	3	0	0	3
9		DF	(Greece) Filotas Pellios	2	0	0	2
10		DF	(Greece) Ioannis Gounaris	1	0	0	1
10		FW	(Greece) Lefteris Tsakiropoulos	1	0	0	1
Own goals				2	0	0	2
TOTALS				62	20	11	93

Source: Match reports in competitive matches, RSSSF
