= 1974–75 PAOK FC season =

PAOK
1974–75 season
- President: Arthouros Mardikian
- Manager: Les Shannon; Lakis Progios; Gyula Lóránt
- Stadium: Toumba Stadium
- Alpha Ethniki: 3rd
- Greek Cup: Semi-finals
- UEFA Cup Winners' Cup: 1st round
- Top goalscorer: League: Stavros Sarafis (15); All: Stavros Sarafis (15)
- Highest home attendance: 39,167 vs Red Star Belgrade

The 1974–75 season was PAOK Football Club's 49th in existence and the club's 16th consecutive season in the top flight of Greek football. The team entered the Greek Football Cup in first round, and also participated in the UEFA Cup Winners' Cup.

== Players ==
=== Squad ===
Note: Flags indicate national team as defined under FIFA eligibility rules; some limited exceptions apply. Players may hold more than one non-FIFA nationality.

No.	Pos.	Nation	Player
—	GK	SUI	René Deck
—	GK	GRE	Ioannis Stefas
—	DF	GRE	Kostas Iosifidis
—	DF	GRE	Ioannis Gounaris
—	DF	GRE	Filotas Pellios
—	DF	GRE	Aristotelis Fountoukidis
—	DF	GRE	Babis Tsilingiridis
—	DF	GRE	Ioannis Chatziantoniou
—	DF	GRE	Themis Kapousouzis

No.	Pos.	Nation	Player
—	MF	GRE	Giorgos Koudas (captain)
—	MF	GRE	Koulis Apostolidis
—	MF	GRE	Stavros Sarafis
—	MF	GRE	Christos Terzanidis
—	MF	GRE	Angelos Anastasiadis
—	MF	GRE	Vasilis Lazos
—	MF	GRE	Apostolos Batis
—	FW	GRE	Achilleas Aslanidis
—	FW	GRE	Dimitris Paridis
—	FW	GRE	Panagiotis Kermanidis
—	FW	BRA	Neto Guerino

== Transfers ==
Players transferred in

Transfer Window	Pos.	Name	Club	Fee
Summer	GK	(Switzerland) René Deck	(Switzerland) Grasshopper	2.67 million Dr.
Summer	FW	(Brazil) Neto Guerino	(Brazil) Nacional	Free

Players transferred out

Transfer Window	Pos.	Name	Club	Fee
Summer	GK	(Greece) Apostolos Savvoulidis	(Greece) Panetolikos	Free
Summer	DF	(Greece) Christos Kalifoulis	(Greece) Panetolikos	Free
Summer	MF	(Greece) Georgios Paraschos	(Greece) Kastoria	Free

== Pre-season ==
Win Draw Loss

17 August 1974 Friendly	Ptolemeos	2–6	PAOK	Ptolemaida
	Eleftheriadis 18'; Chasiotis 55' (pen.)		Aslanidis 5', 62'; Guerino 19'; Koudas 26'; Paridis 53'; Sarafis 66'

18 August 1974 Friendly	Kozani	1–5	PAOK	Kozani
	Kioultzis 80'		Guerino 19', 43'; Paridis 37', 55'; Sarafis 75'

20 August 1974 Friendly	Makedonikos Siatista	2–6	PAOK	Kozani
	Besiris 52', 62'		Aslanidis 7', 24', 61'; Sarafis 35', 80'; Terzanidis 71'

21 August 1974 Friendly	Kozani	0–5	PAOK	Kozani
			Aslanidis; Guerino; Kermanidis; Anastasiadis

22 August 1974 Friendly	Aris Ptolemaida	2–2	PAOK	Ptolemaida
	Anastasiadis 50'; Kapetanios 59'		Sarafis 44'; Aslanidis 58'

23 August 1974 Friendly	Veria	0–1	PAOK	Veria
				Stadium: Veria Stadium

29 August 1974 Friendly	PAOK	3–0	Panionios	Thessaloniki
	Guerino 55'; Aslanidis 69'; Anastasiadis 82'			Stadium: Toumba Stadium

1 September 1974 Friendly	PAOK	5–0	PAS Giannina	Thessaloniki
	Aslanidis 27' (pen.); Guerino 30', 43', 49'; Terzanidis 66'			Stadium: Toumba Stadium; Referee: Dimitriadis

4 September 1974 Friendly	PAOK	4–1	AEL	Thessaloniki
	Guerino 9'; Iosifidis 20'; Koudas 22', 36'		Chaitas 26'	Stadium: Toumba Stadium; Referee: Dimitriadis

8 September 1974 Friendly	PAOK	1–1	Panathinaikos	Thessaloniki
	Aslanidis 80'		Eleftherakis 6'	Stadium: Toumba Stadium

11 September 1974 Friendly	PAOK	0–1	AEK Athens	Thessaloniki
			Papaioannou 32'	Stadium: Toumba Stadium; Referee: Parasidis

== Competitions ==
=== Overview ===
Competition	Record							
Competition	Pld	W	D	L	GF	GA	GD	Win %
Alpha Ethniki	34	19	8	7	73	28	+45	55.88
Greek Cup	4	3	0	1	3	4	−1	75.00
UEFA Cup Winners' Cup	2	1	0	1	1	2	−1	50.00
Total	40	23	8	9	77	34	+43	57.50

Source: Competitions

=== Managerial statistics ===
Head coach	From	To	Record							
Head coach	From	To	G	W	D	L	GF	GA	GD	Win %
(England) Les Shannon	Start of season	06.10.1974	2	0	0	2	1	4	−3	0.00
(Greece) Apostolos Progios (Interim)	20.10.1974	22.12.1974	8	6	2	0	25	6	+19	75.00
(Hungary) Gyula Lóránt	29.12.1974	End of season	28	16	6	6	50	22	+28	57.14

== Alpha Ethniki ==
=== Standings ===
Pos	Team	Pld	W	D	L	GF	GA	GD	Pts	Qualification or relegation
1	Olympiacos (C)	34	24	9	1	65	21	+44	57	Qualification for European Cup first round
2	AEK Athens	34	23	9	2	73	20	+53	55	Qualification for UEFA Cup first round
3	PAOK	34	19	8	7	73	28	+45	46	Qualification for UEFA Cup first round
4	Ethnikos Piraeus	34	17	11	6	48	28	+20	45	
5	Panathinaikos	34	14	12	8	62	41	+21	40	Qualification for Cup Winners' Cup first round (Note: Since Olympiacos, winners of 1974–75 Greek Football Cup, was qualified for the 1975–76 European Cup, losing cup finalists Panathinaikos earned a spot in the first round of the 1975–76 European Cup Winners' Cup.)

Source: RSSSF
Rules for classification: 1st points; 2nd decision match; 3rd head-to-head goal difference.
(C) Champions

==== Results summary ====
Overall								Home						Away					
Pld	W	D	L	GF	GA	GD	Pts	W	D	L	GF	GA	GD	W	D	L	GF	GA	GD
34	19	8	7	73	28	+45	65	15	2	0	56	9	+47	4	6	7	17	19	−2

Last updated: 8 June 1975.
Source: Competitive matches

==== Results by round ====
Round	1	2	3	4	5	6	7	8	9	10	11	12	13	14	15	16	17	18	19	20	21	22	23	24	25	26	27	28	29	30	31	32	33	34
Ground	A	A	H	A	H	A	H	A	H	H	A	H	A	H	A	H	A	H	H	A	H	A	H	A	H	A	A	H	A	H	A	H	A	H
Result	L	L	W	D	W	W	W	D	W	W	W	D	L	W	D	D	W	W	W	W	W	D	W	D	W	L	L	W	L	W	L	W	D	W
Position	14	15	10	9	7	5	5	5	4	4	4	4	4	4	4	4	4	4	4	4	3	3	3	3	3	3	4	4	4	3	4	3	3	3

Source: League matches
A = Away; H = Home; W = Win; D = Draw; L = Loss

==== Matches ====
Win Draw Loss

29 September 1974 1	Panachaiki	2–0	PAOK	Patras
	Rigas 26'; Spentzopoulos 47'			Stadium: Kostas Davourlis Stadium; Referee: Xanthos

6 October 1974 2	Aris	2–1	PAOK	Thessaloniki
	Spyridon 73'; Alexiadis 80'		Aslanidis 53' (pen.)	Stadium: Kleanthis Vikelidis Stadium; Attendance: 18,246; Referee: Jean Dubach (Switzerland)

20 October 1974 3	PAOK	6–2	Kavala	Thessaloniki
	Paridis 13'; Aslanidis 24', 36', 56'; Sarafis 66'; Kermanidis 79'		Machairidis 38'; Avramidis 64' (pen.)	Stadium: Toumba Stadium; Referee: Eleftheriadis

27 October 1974 4	Olympiacos Volos	0–0	PAOK	Volos
			Koudas (red card) 40'	Stadium: Volos Municipal Stadium; Referee: Panagopoulos

3 November 1974 5	PAOK	2–0	Kalamata	Thessaloniki
	Sarafis 12'; Aslanidis 52'			Stadium: Toumba Stadium

10 November 1974 6	Iraklis	1–4	PAOK	Thessaloniki
	Pellios 44' (o.g.); Kousoulakis (red card) 62'		Aslanidis 56', 60', 85'; Guerino 87'	Stadium: Kaftanzoglio Stadium; Referee: Zlatanos

24 November 1974 7	PAOK	3–1	Egaleo	Thessaloniki
	Koudas 33'; Aslanidis 49'; Guerino 63'		Martinos 51'	Stadium: Toumba Stadium; Referee: Adamakis

1 December 1974 8	Panathinaikos	1–1	PAOK	Athens
	Eleftherakis 21'		Sarafis 31'	Stadium: Leoforos Stadium; Attendance: 23,886

15 December 1974 9	PAOK	2–0	Olympiacos	Thessaloniki
	Kermanidis 21'; Terzanidis 70'			Stadium: Toumba Stadium; Attendance: 37,448

22 December 1974 10	PAOK	7–1	Kastoria	Thessaloniki
	Koudas 12', 31'; Kermanidis 27'; Sarafis 32', 43'; Fountoukidis 62'; Aslanidis 66'		Tsouloukidis 18'	Stadium: Toumba Stadium; Attendance: 13,441; Referee: Latsios

29 December 1974 11	Atromitos	0–1	PAOK	Athens
			Aslanidis 47'	Stadium: Peristeri Stadium; Attendance: 8,659

5 January 1975 12	PAOK	1–1	AEK Athens	Thessaloniki
	Kermanidis 19'		Wagner 3'	Stadium: Toumba Stadium; Attendance: 39,017

12 January 1975 13	Ethnikos Piraeus	1–0	PAOK	Piraeus
	Apostolidis 85' (o.g.)			Stadium: Karaiskakis Stadium

19 January 1975 14	PAOK	4–1	PAS Giannina	Thessaloniki
	Koudas 6'; Paridis 52', 86'; Apostolidis 76'		Komitsis 44'	Stadium: Toumba Stadium

22 January 1975 15	Panserraikos	0–0	PAOK	Serres
				Stadium: Serres Municipal Stadium; Referee: Marinos

26 January 1975 16	PAOK	1–1	Panionios	Thessaloniki
	Aslanidis (penalty missed) 10' 21'		Emvoliadis 13'	Stadium: Toumba Stadium; Referee: Papavassiliou

2 February 1975 17	AEL	0–2	PAOK	Larissa
			Kermanidis 19'; Guerino 63'	Stadium: Alcazar Stadium

9 February 1975 18	PAOK	3–1	Panachaiki	Thessaloniki
	Anastasiadis 3' (pen.), 27'; Sarafis 48'		Stravopodis 20'	Stadium: Toumba Stadium; Referee: Karvelis

16 February 1975 19	PAOK	5–0	Aris	Thessaloniki
	Paridis 23'; Koudas 28', 51'; Tsilingiridis 68'; Sarafis 87'			Stadium: Toumba Stadium; Attendance: 36,025; Referee: Pantzalis

2 March 1975 20	Kavala	0–1	PAOK	Kavala
			Paridis 55'	Stadium: Kavala Stadium; Referee: Theodorou

9 March 1975 21	PAOK	3–0	Olympiacos Volos	Thessaloniki
	Koudas 25'; Sarafis 30'; Gounaris 33'			Stadium: Toumba Stadium

16 March 1975 22	Kalamata	0–0	PAOK	Kalamata
				Stadium: Kalamata Municipal Stadium; Referee: Pantzalis

23 March 1975 23	PAOK	3–0	Iraklis	Thessaloniki
	Koudas 20'; Apostolidis 66'; Sarafis 72' (pen.)			Stadium: Toumba Stadium

29 March 1975 24	Egaleo	1–1	PAOK	Athens
	Trouboukis 71'		Anastasiadis 74'	Stadium: Stavros Mavrothalassitis Stadium; Referee: Marinos

5 April 1975 25	PAOK	2–0	Panathinaikos	Thessaloniki
	Apostolidis 29'; Sarafis 41'			Stadium: Toumba Stadium; Attendance: 30,418

13 April 1975 26	Olympiacos	3–2	PAOK	Piraeus
	Davourlis 14' (pen.); Kritikopoulos 43'; Persidis 60'		Sarafis 4', 87' (pen.)	Stadium: Karaiskakis Stadium; Attendance: 39,210

20 April 1975 27	Kastoria	1–0	PAOK	Kastoria
	Moschofidis 13'			Stadium: Kastoria Stadium

27 April 1975 28	PAOK	5–1	Atromitos	Thessaloniki
	Apostolidis 2'; Kermanidis 3'; Sarafis 54'; Terzanidis 64'; Lazos 71'		Vakalis 20'	Stadium: Toumba Stadium

5 May 1975 29	AEK Athens	3–1	PAOK	Athens
	Nikolaou 28'; Wagner 58'; Ardizoglou 85'		Guerino 88'	Stadium: Nikos Goumas Stadium; Attendance: 16,606; Referee: Papazoglou

11 May 1975 30	PAOK	3–0	Ethnikos Piraeus	Thessaloniki
	Sarafis 2'; Apostolidis 79'; Guerino 88'			Stadium: Toumba Stadium

18 May 1975 31	PAS Giannina	2–1	PAOK	Ioannina
	Álvarez 17', 33'		Guerino 38'	Stadium: Zosimades Stadium; Referee: Karvelis

25 May 1975 32	PAOK	2–0	Panserraikos	Thessaloniki
	Katsavakis 31' (o.g.); Sarafis 72' (pen.)			Stadium: Toumba Stadium; Referee: Platopoulos

1 June 1975 33	Panionios	2–2	PAOK	Athens
	Psimogiannos 21', 78'		Aslanidis 77'; Paridis 85'	Stadium: Nea Smyrni Stadium

8 June 1975 34	PAOK	4–0	AEL	Thessaloniki
	Guerino 15', 48'; Seitaridis 35' (o.g.); Anastasiadis 42'			Stadium: Toumba Stadium; Attendance: 6,285; Referee: Chiotakis

== Greek Cup ==
=== Third round ===
5 February 1975	PAOK	1–0	Ilisiakos	Thessaloniki
	Anastasiadis 6'			Stadium: Toumba Stadium; Referee: Tsanaklidis

=== Fourth round ===
19 March 1975	Chania	0–1	PAOK	Chania
			Apostolidis 77'	Stadium: Perivolia Municipal Stadium; Referee: Papavassiliou

=== Quarter–finals ===
30 April 1974	PAOK	1–0	Panionios	Thessaloniki
	Terzanidis 25'			Stadium: Toumba Stadium; Attendance: 11,087

=== Semi–finals ===
28 May 1975	Olympiacos	4–0	PAOK	Piraeus
	Persidis 16'; Kritikopoulos 70', 90'; Losada 73'			Stadium: Karaiskakis Stadium

== UEFA Cup Winners' Cup ==
=== First round ===
18 September 1974 1st leg	PAOK (Greece)	1–0	(Socialist Federal Republic of Yugoslavia) Red Star Belgrade	Thessaloniki, Greece
	Terzanidis 67'			Stadium: Toumba Stadium; Attendance: 39,167; Referee: Domenico Serafino (Italy)

2 October 1974 2nd leg	Red Star Belgrade (Socialist Federal Republic of Yugoslavia)	2–0 (a.e.t.) (2–1 agg.)	(Greece) PAOK	Belgrade, Yugoslavia
	Petrović 58'; Savić 103'			Stadium: Red Star Stadium; Referee: Anton Bucheli (Switzerland)

== Statistics ==
=== Squad statistics ===
As of June 8, 1975

Appearances denote players in the starting lineup, with the numbers in parentheses denoting appearances as substitute.

No.	Name	Alpha Ethniki		Greek Cup		UEFA CWC		Total	
No.	Name	Apps	Goals	Apps	Goals	Apps	Goals	Apps	Goals
Goalkeepers
	(Switzerland) René Deck	31	0	4	0	2	0	37	0
	(Greece) Ioannis Stefas	3	0	0	0	0	0	3	0
Defenders
	(Greece) Kostas Iosifidis	33	0	4	0	2	0	39	0
	(Greece) Filotas Pellios	33	0	4	0	2	0	39	0
	(Greece) Aristos Fountoukidis	32	1	4	0	1	0	37	1
	(Greece) Ioannis Gounaris	30	1	3	0	2	0	35	1
	(Greece) Babis Tsilingiridis	21	1	3	0	2	0	26	1
	(Greece) Ioannis Chatziantoniou	7	0	2	0	0	0	9	0
	(Greece) Themis Kapousouzis	2	0	0	0	0	0	2	0
Midfielders
	(Greece) Koulis Apostolidis	30	5	4	1	2	0	36	6
	(Greece) Angelos Anastasiadis	30	4	4	1	1	0	35	5
	(Greece) Stavros Sarafis	27	15	3	0	2	0	32	15
	(Greece) Giorgos Koudas	24	8	1	0	2	0	27	8
	(Greece) Christos Terzanidis	21	2	2	1	2	1	25	4
	(Greece) Vasilis Lazos	12	1	1	0	0	0	13	1
	(Greece) Apostolos Batis	2	0	1	0	0	0	3	0
Forwards
	(Greece) Panagiotis Kermanidis	29	6	4	0	2	0	35	6
	(Greece) Dimitris Paridis	23	6	3	0	0	0	26	6
	(Greece) Achilleas Aslanidis	19	13	0	0	2	0	21	13
	(Brazil) Neto Guerino	15	8	2	0	1	0	18	8

Source: Match reports in competitive matches, RSSSF

=== Goalscorers ===
Rank	No.	Pos.	Player	Alpha Ethniki	Greek Cup	UEFA CWC	Total
1		MF	(Greece) Stavros Sarafis	15	0	0	15
2		FW	(Greece) Achilleas Aslanidis	13	0	0	13
3		MF	(Greece) Giorgos Koudas	8	0	0	8
3		FW	(Brazil) Neto Guerino	8	0	0	8
5		FW	(Greece) Panagiotis Kermanidis	6	0	0	6
5		FW	(Greece) Dimitris Paridis	6	0	0	6
5		MF	(Greece) Koulis Apostolidis	5	1	0	6
8		MF	(Greece) Angelos Anastasiadis	4	1	0	5
9		MF	(Greece) Christos Terzanidis	2	1	1	4
10		DF	(Greece) Ioannis Gounaris	1	0	0	1
10		DF	(Greece) Aristos Fountoukidis	1	0	0	1
10		DF	(Greece) Babis Tsilingiridis	1	0	0	1
10		MF	(Greece) Vasilis Lazos	1	0	0	1
Own goals				2	0	0	2
TOTALS				73	3	1	77

Source: Match reports in competitive matches, RSSSF
