= 1976–77 PAOK FC season =

PAOK
1976–77 season
- President: Giorgos Pantelakis
- Manager: Branko Stanković; Billy Bingham
- Stadium: Toumba Stadium
- Alpha Ethniki: 3rd
- Greek Cup: Runners-up
- European Cup: Second round
- Top goalscorer: League: Neto Guerino (13); All: Neto Guerino (18)
- Highest home attendance: 45,252 vs AEK Athens

The 1976–77 season was PAOK Football Club's 51st in existence and the club's 18th consecutive season in the top flight of Greek football. The team entered the Greek Football Cup in first round and also competed in the European Cup.

== Players ==
=== Squad ===
Note: Flags indicate national team as defined under FIFA eligibility rules; some limited exceptions apply. Players may hold more than one non-FIFA nationality.

No.	Pos.	Nation	Player
—	GK	YUG	Mladen Furtula
—	GK	GRE	Diamantis Milinis
—	DF	GRE	Kostas Iosifidis
—	DF	GRE	Ioannis Gounaris
—	DF	GRE	Filotas Pellios
—	DF	GRE	Aristotelis Fountoukidis
—	DF	GRE	Themis Kapousouzis
—	MF	GRE	Giorgos Koudas (captain)
—	MF	GRE	Koulis Apostolidis
—	MF	GRE	Angelos Anastasiadis

No.	Pos.	Nation	Player
—	MF	GRE	Stavros Sarafis
—	MF	GRE	Christos Terzanidis
—	MF	GRE	Ioannis Damanakis
—	MF	GRE	Dimitris Voulgaris
—	FW	BRA	Neto Guerino
—	FW	GRE	Panagiotis Kermanidis
—	FW	GRE	Kostas Orfanos
—	FW	GRE	Dimitris Paridis
—	FW	GRE	Alexandros Boditsopoulos
—	FW	GRE	Nikos Panagiotidis

== Transfers ==
Players transferred in

Transfer Window	Pos.	Name	Club	Fee
Summer	MF	(Greece) Ioannis Damanakis	(Greece) AO Chania	?

Players transferred out

Transfer Window	Pos.	Name	Club	Fee
Summer	FW	(Greece) Achilleas Aslanidis	(Greece) Panathinaikos	7.5 million Dr.

== Pre-season ==
Win Draw Loss

9 August 1976 Friendly	Akropolis	0–15	PAOK	Malente, West Germany
			Orfanos; Boditsopoulos; Sarafis; Kermanidis; Damanakis

11 August 1976 Friendly	Eutin 08	0–1	PAOK	Malente, West Germany
			Kermanidis 30'

15 August 1976 Friendly	TSV Plön 1864	2–6	PAOK	Malente, West Germany
			Guerino; Apostolidis; Koudas; Damanakis

17 August 1976 Friendly	VfB Lübeck	0–1	PAOK	Malente, West Germany
			Koudas 23'

28 August 1976 Friendly	PAOK	1–0	Aris	Thessaloniki
	Kermanidis 10'			Stadium: Toumba Stadium

1 September 1976 Friendly	Iraklis	2–3	PAOK	Thessaloniki
	Antoniewicz 9'; Touboglou 57'		Apostolidis 14'; Anastasiadis 41' (pen.); Damanakis 77'	Stadium: Kaftanzoglio Stadium; Referee: Vassaras

4 September 1976 Friendly	AEK Athens	2–1	PAOK	Nea Filadelfeia
21:00 EEST (UTC+3)	Wagner (yellow card) 43'; Mavros 57'; Apostolidis 85' (o.g.)	Report	Koudas 6'; Terzanidis (yellow card) 19'	Stadium: AEK Stadium; Attendance: 16,301; Referee: Takis Moumtzis (Athens)

8 September 1976 Friendly	PAOK	2–0	Panathinaikos	Thessaloniki
	Apostolidis 5'; Kermanidis 61'			Stadium: Toumba Stadium

10 September 1976 Friendly	PAOK	3–0	AO Chania	Thessaloniki
	Anastasiadis 35'; Sarafis 55'; Paridis 77' (pen.)			Stadium: Toumba Stadium; Referee: Pobieris

12 September 1976 Friendly	PAOK	4–0	AO Chania	Thessaloniki
	Anastasiadis 34'; Paridis 72'; Voulgaris 78'; Damanakis 85'			Stadium: Toumba Stadium; Referee: Tikmoglou

19 September 1976 Friendly	Panathinaikos	1–2	PAOK	Athens
	Papadimitriou 11'		Paridis 8' (pen.); Pellios 36'	Stadium: Leoforos Stadium; Referee: Karasoulas

26 September 1976 Friendly	PAOK	2–1	Pierikos	Thessaloniki
	Sarafis 4'; Koudas 19'		Mytilinaios 54'	Stadium: Toumba Stadium; Referee: Drizis

== Competitions ==
=== Overview ===
Competition	Record							
Competition	Pld	W	D	L	GF	GA	GD	Win %
Alpha Ethniki	34	21	10	3	63	27	+36	61.76
Greek Cup	5	4	0	1	13	5	+8	80.00
European Cup	4	1	1	2	3	7	−4	25.00
Total	43	26	11	6	79	39	+40	60.47

Source: Competitions

=== Managerial statistics ===
Head coach	From	To	Record							
Head coach	From	To	G	W	D	L	GF	GA	GD	Win %
(Socialist Federal Republic of Yugoslavia) Branko Stanković	Start of season	03.04.1977	33	22	7	4	66	32	+34	66.67
(England) Billy Bingham	11.04.1977	End of season	10	4	4	2	13	7	+6	40.00

== Alpha Ethniki ==
=== Standings ===
Pos	Team	Pld	W	D	L	GF	GA	GD	Pts	Qualification or relegation
1	Panathinaikos (C)	34	23	8	3	70	20	+50	54	Qualification for European Cup first round
2	Olympiacos	34	23	6	5	70	27	+43	52	Qualification for UEFA Cup first round
3	PAOK	34	21	10	3	63	27	+36	52	Qualification for Cup Winners' Cup first round (Note: Since Panathinaikos, winners of 1976–77 Greek Cup, were qualified for the 1977–78 European Cup, runners-up PAOK earned a spot in the first round of the 1977–78 European Cup Winners' Cup.)
4	AEK Athens	34	24	3	7	63	29	+34	51	Qualification for UEFA Cup first round
5	Aris	34	17	8	9	58	34	+24	42	

Source: RSSSF
Rules for classification: 1st points; 2nd total goal ratio; 3rd decision match.
(C) Champions

==== Results summary ====
Overall								Home						Away					
Pld	W	D	L	GF	GA	GD	Pts	W	D	L	GF	GA	GD	W	D	L	GF	GA	GD
34	21	10	3	63	27	+36	73	12	5	0	33	9	+24	9	5	3	30	18	+12

Last updated: 27 June 1977.
Source: Competitive matches

==== Results by round ====
Round	1	2	3	4	5	6	7	8	9	10	11	12	13	14	15	16	17	18	19	20	21	22	23	24	25	26	27	28	29	30	31	32	33	34
Ground	A	H	A	H	A	A	H	A	H	A	H	A	H	H	A	H	A	H	A	H	A	H	H	A	H	A	H	A	H	A	A	H	A	H
Result	D	W	W	W	W	W	W	D	W	W	D	W	W	W	D	W	L	D	W	W	D	W	W	W	W	L	W	L	D	W	W	D	D	D
Position	13	5	3	2	2	2	2	2	1	1	1	1	1	1	1	1	2	2	1	2	2	2	1	1	1	1	1	2	2	2	2	3	3	3

Source: League matches
A = Away; H = Home; W = Win; D = Draw; L = Loss

==== Matches ====
Win Draw Loss

3 October 1976 1	Kavala	0–0	PAOK	Kavala
				Stadium: Kavala Stadium; Referee: Panagopoulos

17 October 1976 2	PAOK	2–0	Panachaiki	Thessaloniki
	Gounaris 30'; Damanakis 65'			Stadium: Toumba Stadium; Referee: Ioannidis

24 October 1976 3	Atromitos	1–6	PAOK	Athens
	Athanasopoulos 34'		Kermanidis 8'; Sarafis 20', 25'; Koudas 38', 43'; Anastasiadis 80'	Stadium: Leoforos Stadium; Attendance: 7,033; Referee: Sarakinos

31 October 1976 4	PAOK	3–0	Panionios	Thessaloniki
	Kermanidis 37'; Koudas 51' (pen.), 55'			Stadium: Toumba Stadium; Referee: Pantzalis

7 November 1976 5	Kastoria	0–2	PAOK	Kastoria
			Orfanos 58'; Kermanidis 85'	Stadium: Municipal Stadium of Kastoria; Attendance: 3,992; Referee: Paschalidis

14 November 1976 6	Aris	1–2	PAOK	Thessaloniki
	Drampis 6'		Kermanidis 83'; Orfanos 84'	Stadium: Kleanthis Vikelidis Stadium; Attendance: 21,500; Referee: Papazoglou

21 November 1976 7	PAOK	6–1	Pierikos	Thessaloniki
	Apostolidis 15'; Guerino 37', 50'; Damanakis 52'; Orfanos 80', 85'		Kalampakas 67'	Stadium: Toumba Stadium; Referee: Alexopoulos

28 November 1976 8	Panserraikos	3–3	PAOK	Serres
	Tsirikas 3' (pen.); Kaltsas 35'; Pantazis 42'		Guerino 10'; Apostolidis 13'; Kermanidis 52'	Stadium: Serres Municipal Stadium; Referee: Sarakinos

5 December 1976 9	PAOK	2–1	Olympiacos	Thessaloniki
	Guerino (penalty missed) 30' 30'; Kermanidis 75'		Aidiniou 13'; Synetopoulos (red card) 38'	Stadium: Toumba Stadium; Attendance: 45,147; Referee: Ornerakis

12 December 1976 10	Iraklis	0–3	PAOK	Thessaloniki
			Iosifidis 78'; Anastasiadis 84' (pen.); Sarafis 89'	Stadium: Kaftanzoglio Stadium; Attendance: 22,174; Referee: Marinos

19 December 1976 11	PAOK	0–0	AEK Athens	Thessaloniki
				Stadium: Toumba Stadium; Attendance: 45,252; Referee: Levogiannis

26 December 1976 12	PAS Giannina	4–5	PAOK	Ioannina
	Espinosa 11', 90'; Glasmanis 48'; Brentanos 59' (pen.)		Guerino 10', 27'; Kermanidis 36'; Damanakis 73'; Sarafis 77'	Stadium: Zosimades Stadium; Referee: Sarakinos

2 January 1977 13	PAOK	2–1	Ethnikos Piraeus	Thessaloniki
	Kermanidis 6', 31'		Kritikos 56'	Stadium: Toumba Stadium; Attendance: 15,932; Referee: Patarakis

9 January 1977 14	PAOK	2–1	Panetolikos	Thessaloniki
	Orfanos 70', 75' (pen.)		Fountoukidis 2' (o.g.)	Stadium: Toumba Stadium; Attendance: 11,087; Referee: Xanthos

16 January 1977 15	Panathinaikos	0–0	PAOK	Athens
				Stadium: Leoforos Stadium; Attendance: 23,684; Referee: Lagogiannis

23 January 1977 16	PAOK	2–0	Apollon Athens	Thessaloniki
	Sarafis 9'; Guerino 42'			Stadium: Toumba Stadium; Attendance: 12,681; Referee: Zlatanos

30 January 1977 17	OFI	2–1	PAOK	Rethymno
	Alexandris 7'; Gialamas 9'		Sarafis 89'	Stadium: Rethymno Stadium; Attendance: 5,850; Referee: Vassaras

6 February 1977 18	PAOK	1–1	Kavala	Thessaloniki
	Orfanos 72' (pen.)		Machairidis 35'	Stadium: Toumba Stadium; Attendance: 17,275; Referee: Lekkas

13 February 1977 19	Panachaiki	1–2	PAOK	Patras
	Ioakeimidis 71' (pen.)		Orfanos 36'; Guerino 55'	Stadium: Kostas Davourlis Stadium; Attendance: 10,219; Referee: Thomaidis

20 February 1977 20	PAOK	2–1	Atromitos	Thessaloniki
	Iosifidis 44'; Apostolidis 80'		Skarpelis 15'	Stadium: Toumba Stadium; Attendance: 10,501; Referee: Tsoukaladelis

27 February 1977 21	Panionios	0–0	PAOK	Athens
				Stadium: Nea Smyrni Stadium; Attendance: 5,710; Referee: Petrakis

6 March 1977 22	PAOK	2–1	Kastoria	Thessaloniki
	Anastasiadis 63'; Guerino 75'		Kopanos 81'	Stadium: Toumba Stadium; Attendance: 16,528; Referee: Fakis

13 March 1977 23	PAOK	2–0	Aris	Thessaloniki
	Guerino 75'; Orfanos 81'			Stadium: Toumba Stadium; Attendance: 41,950; Referee: Marinelis

20 March 1977 24	Pierikos	1–2	PAOK	Katerini
	Kostikos 21'		Anastasiadis 34'; Guerino 50'	Stadium: Katerini Stadium; Referee: Saraliotis

27 March 1977 25	PAOK	3–0	Panserraikos	Thessaloniki
	Guerino 19' (pen.); Koudas 62'; Sarafis 71'			Stadium: Toumba Stadium; Attendance: 17,703; Referee: Panagopoulos

3 April 1977 26	Olympiacos	2–0	PAOK	Piraeus
	Kritikopoulos 2'; Delikaris 12'			Stadium: Karaiskakis Stadium; Attendance: 39,200; Referee: Paschalidis

11 April 1977 27	PAOK	2–0	Iraklis	Thessaloniki
	Kermanidis 67'; Koudas 89'			Stadium: Toumba Stadium; Attendance: 25,895; Referee: Lagogiannis

1 May 1977 28	AEK Athens	1–0	PAOK	Nea Filadelfeia
	Nikoloudis 11'		Damanakis (red card) 43'	Stadium: AEK Stadium; Attendance: 22,161; Referee: Tsoukaladelis

15 May 1977 29	PAOK	1–1	PAS Giannina	Thessaloniki
	Guerino 21'		Kontogeorgakis 25' (pen.)	Stadium: Toumba Stadium; Attendance: 15,543; Referee: Marinelis

22 May 1977 30	Ethnikos Piraeus	1–2	PAOK	Piraeus
	Intzoglou 31'		Sarafis 59'; Terzanidis 84'	Stadium: Karaiskakis Stadium; Referee: Karakitsos

5 June 1977 31	Panetolikos	1–2	PAOK	Agrinio
	Papaioannou 45'		Orfanos 20', 61'	Stadium: Panetolikos Stadium; Attendance: 7,455; Referee: Labropoulos

12 June 1977 32	PAOK	0–0	Panathinaikos	Thessaloniki
				Stadium: Toumba Stadium; Attendance: 44,705; Referee: Patarakis

19 June 1977 33	Apollon Athens	0–0	PAOK	Athens
				Stadium: Rizoupoli Stadium; Referee: Lagogiannis

26 June 1977 34	PAOK	1–1	OFI	Thessaloniki
	Anastasiadis 36' (pen.)		Karaiskos 76'	Stadium: Toumba Stadium; Attendance: 3,909; Referee: Paschalidis

== Greek Cup ==
=== First round ===
1 December 1976	PAOK	3–0	Panthrakikos	Thessaloniki
	Guerino 20'; Kermanidis 64'; Orfanos 87'			Stadium: Toumba Stadium; Attendance: 2,742; Referee: Lekkas

=== Second round ===
Bye

=== Third round ===
9 February 1977	PAOK	2–1	AEK Athens	Thessaloniki
	Guerino 21'; Apostolidis 50'		Mavros 44'; Intzoglou (penalty missed) 57'	Stadium: Toumba Stadium; Attendance: 44,045; Referee: Levogiannis

=== Quarter–finals ===
17 March 1977	Ethnikos Piraeus	2–3	PAOK	Piraeus
	Rohrbach 87'; Intzoglou (penalty missed) 80' 90'		Kermanidis 43'; Guerino 64'; Koudas 74'	Stadium: Karaiskakis Stadium; Attendance: 27,997; Referee: Petropoulos

=== Semi–finals ===
8 June 1977	PAOK	4–0	Fostiras	Thessaloniki
	Orfanos 4', 42'; Guerino 57' (pen.), 82'			Stadium: Toumba Stadium; Attendance: 18,517

=== Final ===
22 June 1977	Panathinaikos	2–1	PAOK	Piraeus
21:00 EEST	Papadimitriou 29'; Vakalis 83'		Terzanidis 43'; Gounaris (red card) 64'	Stadium: Karaiskakis Stadium; Attendance: 28,490; Referee: Platopoulos

== European Cup ==
=== First round ===
15 September 1976 1st leg	Omonia (Cyprus)	0–2	(Greece) PAOK	Nicosia, Cyprus
		Report	Koudas 38'; Sarafis 87'	Stadium: GSP Stadium (1902); Attendance: 9,400; Referee: Tsvetan Stanev (Bulgaria)

29 September 1976 2nd leg	PAOK (Greece)	1–1 (3–1 agg.)	(Cyprus) Omonia	Thessaloniki, Greece
	Sarafis 67'	Report	Demetriou 33' (pen.)	Stadium: Toumba Stadium; Referee: Michal Jursa (Czechoslovakia)

=== Second round ===
20 October 1976 1st leg	Dynamo Kyiv (Soviet Union)	4–0	(Greece) PAOK	Kyiv, Soviet Union
	Buryak 12', 22'; Kolotov 27'; Slobodyan 60'	Report		Stadium: Central Stadium, Kyiv; Referee: Charles Corver (Netherlands)

3 November 1976 2nd leg	PAOK (Greece)	0–2 (0–6 agg.)	(Soviet Union) Dynamo Kyiv	Thessaloniki, Greece
		Report	Kolotov 73'; Blokhin 82'	Stadium: Toumba Stadium; Attendance: 27,350; Referee: Cesare Gussoni (Italy)

== Statistics ==
=== Squad statistics ===
As of June 27, 1977

Appearances denote players in the starting lineup, with the numbers in parentheses denoting appearances as substitute.

No.	Name	Alpha Ethniki		Greek Cup		European Cup		Total	
No.	Name	Apps	Goals	Apps	Goals	Apps	Goals	Apps	Goals
Goalkeepers
	(Socialist Federal Republic of Yugoslavia) Mladen Furtula	15	0	3	0	4	0	22	0
	(Greece) Diamantis Milinis	20	0	2	0	0	0	22	0
Defenders
	(Greece) Kostas Iosifidis	33	2	4	0	4	0	41	2
	(Greece) Ioannis Gounaris	32	1	5	0	4	0	41	1
	(Greece) Filotas Pellios	31	0	5	0	4	0	40	0
	(Greece) Aristotelis Fountoukidis	28	0	2	0	3	0	33	0
	(Greece) Themis Kapousouzis	11	0	1	0	2	0	14	0
Midfielders
	(Greece) Stavros Sarafis	31	8	5	0	4	2	40	10
	(Greece) Angelos Anastasiadis	30	5	5	0	4	0	39	5
	(Greece) Ioannis Damanakis	30	3	5	0	4	0	39	3
	(Greece) Koulis Apostolidis	30	3	4	1	3	0	37	4
	(Greece) Christos Terzanidis	29	1	5	1	3	0	37	2
	(Greece) Giorgos Koudas	26	6	4	1	4	1	34	8
	(Greece) Dimitris Voulgaris	4	0	0	0	0	0	4	0
Forwards
	(Brazil) Neto Guerino	30	13	5	5	2	0	37	18
	(Greece) Panagiotis Kermanidis	27	10	3	2	4	0	34	12
	(Greece) Kostas Orfanos	24	11	5	3	1	0	30	14
	(Greece) Dimitris Paridis	3	0	0	0	1	0	4	0
	(Greece) Alexandros Boditsopoulos	3	0	1	0	0	0	4	0
	(Greece) Nikos Panagiotidis	1	0	0	0	0	0	1	0

Source: Match reports in competitive matches, RSSSF

=== Goalscorers ===
Rank	No.	Pos.	Player	Alpha Ethniki	Greek Cup	European Cup	Total
1		FW	(Brazil) Neto Guerino	13	5	0	18
2		FW	(Greece) Kostas Orfanos	11	3	0	14
3		FW	(Greece) Panagiotis Kermanidis	10	2	0	12
4		MF	(Greece) Stavros Sarafis	8	0	2	10
5		MF	(Greece) Giorgos Koudas	6	1	1	8
6		MF	(Greece) Angelos Anastasiadis	5	0	0	5
7		MF	(Greece) Koulis Apostolidis	3	1	0	4
8		MF	(Greece) Ioannis Damanakis	3	0	0	3
9		DF	(Greece) Kostas Iosifidis	2	0	0	2
9		MF	(Greece) Christos Terzanidis	1	1	0	2
11		DF	(Greece) Ioannis Gounaris	1	0	0	1
TOTALS				63	13	3	79

Source: Match reports in competitive matches, RSSSF
