= 1980–81 PAOK FC season =

PAOK
1980–81 season
- President: Giorgos Pantelakis
- Manager: Gyula Lóránt; Aristos Fountoukidis
- Stadium: Toumba Stadium
- Alpha Ethniki: 4th
- Greek Cup: Runners-up
- Top goalscorer: League: Kermanidis, Kostikos (9); All: Kermanidis (12)
- Highest home attendance: 36,964 vs AEK Athens

The 1980–81 season was PAOK Football Club's 55th in existence and the club's 22nd consecutive season in the top flight of Greek football. The team entered the Greek Football Cup in first round.

== Players ==
=== Squad ===
Note: Flags indicate national team as defined under FIFA eligibility rules; some limited exceptions apply. Players may hold more than one non-FIFA nationality.

No.	Pos.	Nation	Player
—	GK	YUG	Mladen Furtula
—	GK	GRE	Apostolos Filis
—	DF	GRE	Konstantinos Iosifidis
—	DF	GRE	Ioannis Gounaris
—	DF	HUN	József Salomon
—	DF	GRE	Theodoros Apostolidis
—	DF	GRE	Filotas Pellios
—	DF	GRE	Nikos Alavantas
—	DF	GRE	Apostolos Tsourelas
—	MF	GRE	Giorgos Koudas (captain)
—	MF	GRE	Stavros Sarafis

No.	Pos.	Nation	Player
—	MF	GRE	Angelos Anastasiadis
—	MF	GRE	Ioannis Damanakis
—	MF	GRE	Thomas Singas
—	MF	GRE	Vasilios Vasilakos
—	MF	GRE	Kyriakos Alexandridis
—	MF	GRE	Vasilis Georgopoulos
—	MF	GRE	Stathis Triantafyllidis
—	FW	GRE	Giorgos Kostikos
—	FW	GRE	Panagiotis Kermanidis
—	FW	BRA	Neto Guerino
—	FW	GRE	Christos Dimopoulos

== Transfers ==
Players transferred in

Transfer Window	Pos.	Name	Club	Fee
Summer	DF	(Hungary) József Salomon	(Hungary) Diósgyőri VTK	?
Summer	MF	(Greece) Vasilis Georgopoulos	(Greece) Panachaiki	?
Summer	MF	(Greece) Stathis Triantafyllidis	(Greece) Kavala	6 million Dr.
Summer	FW	(Greece) Christos Dimopoulos	(Greece) Panetolikos	5.4 million Dr.

Players transferred out

Transfer Window	Pos.	Name	Club	Fee
Summer	FW	(Greece) Kostas Orfanos	(Greece) Olympiacos	21 million Dr.

== Pre-season ==
Win Draw Loss

26 July 1980 Friendly	Trikala	1–2	PAOK	Trikala
	Lagaras 43'		Koudas 19'; Guerino 85'	Stadium: Trikala Municipal Stadium

10 August 1980 Friendly	AEL	2–1	PAOK	Larissa
	Spasovski 58' (pen.); Golantas 83'		Sarafis 86' (pen.)	Stadium: Alcazar Stadium

13 August 1980 Friendly	Kavala	1–2	PAOK	Kavala
	Kakalis 23'		Anastasiadis 30'; Dimopoulos 75'	Stadium: Kavala Stadium; Referee: Mantalos

18 August 1980 Friendly	PAOK	1–2	Aris	Thessaloniki
	Anastasiadis 41'		Mokalis 28'; Kouis 59'	Stadium: Kaftanzoglio Stadium

20 August 1980 Friendly	Pierikos	1–1	PAOK	Katerini
	Mischos 47'		Koudas 79'	Stadium: Katerini Stadium; Referee: Vasileiadis

24 August 1980 Friendly	Olympiacos	2–1	PAOK	Piraeus
	Orfanos 11' (pen.); Ahlström 88'		Kermanidis 54'	Stadium: Karaiskakis Stadium; Referee: Vourakis

27 August 1980 Friendly	AEK Athens	0–0	PAOK	Nea Filadelfeia
21:00 EEST				Stadium: AEK Stadium; Attendance: 11,994; Referee: Nikos Fakis (Athens)

31 August 1980 Friendly	Panachaiki	3–1	PAOK	Patras
	Davourlis 22'; Spentzopoulos 75', 86'		Kermanidis 3'	Stadium: Kostas Davourlis Stadium

3 May 1981 Friendly	AEK Athens	0–0	PAOK	Nea Filadelfeia
17:00 EEST			Iosifidis (yellow card) 27'; Apostolidis (yellow card) 30'	Stadium: AEK Stadium; Attendance: 2,562; Referee: Nikos Makris (Athens)

== Competitions ==
=== Overview ===
Competition	Record							
Competition	Pld	W	D	L	GF	GA	GD	Win %
Alpha Ethniki	34	15	12	7	52	31	+21	44.12
Greek Cup	9	7	1	1	19	8	+11	77.78
Total	43	22	13	8	71	39	+32	51.16

Source: Competitions

=== Managerial statistics ===
Head coach	From	To	Record							
Head coach	From	To	G	W	D	L	GF	GA	GD	Win %
(Hungary) Gyula Lóránt	Start of season	31.05.1981	38	19	12	7	62	33	+29	50.00
(Greece) Aristos Fountoukidis (Interim)	03.06.1981	End of season	5	3	1	1	9	6	+3	60.00

== Alpha Ethniki ==
=== Standings ===
Pos	Team	Pld	W	D	L	GF	GA	GD	Pts	Qualification or relegation
2	AEK Athens	34	17	10	7	63	42	+21	44	
3	Aris	34	16	11	7	57	33	+24	43	Qualification for UEFA Cup first round
4	PAOK	34	15	12	7	52	31	+21	42	Qualification for Cup Winners' Cup first round (Note: Since Olympiacos, winners of 1980–81 Greek Football Cup, was qualified for the 1981–82 European Cup, losing cup finalists PAOK earned a spot in the first round of the 1981–82 European Cup Winners' Cup.)
5	Panathinaikos	34	13	13	8	44	21	+23	39	Qualification for UEFA Cup first round
6	AEL	34	14	9	11	42	40	+2	37	

Source: RSSSF
Rules for classification: 1st points; 2nd decision match; 3rd head-to-head goal difference.

==== Results summary ====
Overall								Home						Away					
Pld	W	D	L	GF	GA	GD	Pts	W	D	L	GF	GA	GD	W	D	L	GF	GA	GD
34	15	12	7	52	31	+21	57	11	5	1	41	17	+24	4	7	6	11	14	−3

Last updated: 14 June 1981.
Source: Competitive matches

==== Results by round ====
Round	1	2	3	4	5	6	7	8	9	10	11	12	13	14	15	16	17	18	19	20	21	22	23	24	25	26	27	28	29	30	31	32	33	34
Ground	A	H	A	H	A	A	H	A	H	A	H	A	H	H	A	H	A	H	A	H	A	H	H	A	H	A	H	A	H	A	A	H	A	H
Result	D	L	D	W	D	D	W	L	D	W	D	W	W	W	L	W	D	W	L	W	L	W	W	D	D	D	D	W	W	L	L	W	W	D
Position	10	12	13	7	7	6	5	6	8	6	6	5	4	4	4	4	4	4	4	4	4	4	4	4	4	4	4	4	4	4	4	4	4	4

Source: League matches
A = Away; H = Home; W = Win; D = Draw; L = Loss

==== Matches ====
Win Draw Loss

7 September 1980 1	Kastoria	1–1	PAOK	Kastoria
	Tsironis 39'		Anastasiadis 47'	Stadium: Kastoria Stadium

14 September 1980 2	PAOK	1–2	AEK Athens	Thessaloniki
	Sarafis 49'		Ardizoglou 24'; Mavros 45'	Stadium: Kaftanzoglio Stadium; Attendance: 36,964; Referee: Vourakis
Note: PAOK played 2 home league games at Kaftanzoglio Stadium and 7 at Kleanthis Vikelidis Stadium because Toumba Stadium was closed temporarily due to damage sustained in the June 1978 earthquake.

21 September 1980 3	AEL	0–0	PAOK	Larissa
				Stadium: Alcazar Stadium; Attendance: 9,704; Referee: Rammos

27 September 1980 4	PAOK	3–0	Panachaiki	Thessaloniki
	Sarafis 9' (pen.), 33'; Triantafyllidis 56'			Stadium: Kaftanzoglio Stadium; Attendance: 9,887; Referee: Vourakis

5 October 1980 5	Korinthos	0–0	PAOK	Loutraki
				Stadium: Thodio Stadium; Attendance: 5,724; Referee: Vlastaris

19 October 1980 6	Panionios	1–1	PAOK	Athens
	Pathiakakis 64' (pen.)		Kermanidis 61'	Stadium: Nea Smyrni Stadium; Attendance: 11,064; Referee: Argyriou

26 October 1980 7	PAOK	4–2	Panathinaikos	Thessaloniki
	Koudas 15', 62'; Vasilakos 26'; Alexandridis 77'		Delikaris 64'; Andreuchi 85'	Stadium: Kleanthis Vikelidis Stadium; Attendance: 18,131

2 November 1980 8	PAS Giannina	2–1	PAOK	Ioannina
	Liakos 48'; Papazoglou 69'		Koudas 2'	Stadium: Zosimades Stadium; Attendance: 5,637

9 November 1980 9	PAOK	2–2	Doxa Drama	Thessaloniki
	Sarafis 20' (pen.); Pellios 76'		Charalambidis 22'; Strantzalis 39'	Stadium: Kleanthis Vikelidis Stadium; Attendance: 11,833; Referee: Tsouris

16 November 1980 10	Aris	0–1	PAOK	Thessaloniki
			Kostikos 39'	Stadium: Kleanthis Vikelidis Stadium; Attendance: 26,000; Referee: Mersinis

23 November 1980 11	PAOK	1–1	Ethnikos Piraeus	Thessaloniki
	Sarafis 81' (pen.)		Mitropoulos (red card) 81'; Denev 86' (pen.)	Stadium: Kleanthis Vikelidis Stadium; Attendance: 13,318; Referee: Voulgaris

30 November 1980 12	OFI	0–2	PAOK	Heraklion
			Vasilakos 22', 75'	Stadium: Theodoros Vardinogiannis Stadium; Attendance: 4,448; Referee: Nikolitsas

14 December 1980 13	PAOK	2–0	Kavala	Thessaloniki
	Kermanidis 38'; Petsas 68' (o.g.)			Stadium: Kleanthis Vikelidis Stadium; Attendance: 8,768; Referee: Angelidis

21 December 1980 14	PAOK	3–0	Apollon Athens	Thessaloniki
	Kermanidis 12', 34'; Triantafyllidis 88'			Stadium: Kleanthis Vikelidis Stadium; Attendance: 8,465; Referee: Karavasilis

28 December 1980 15	Olympiacos	1–0	PAOK	Piraeus
	Novoselac 21'		Gounaris (red card) 60'	Stadium: Karaiskakis Stadium; Attendance: 35,500; Referee: Ballis

4 January 1981 16	PAOK	2–0	Atromitos	Thessaloniki
	Kermanidis 61', 86'			Stadium: Kleanthis Vikelidis Stadium; Attendance: 7,997

11 January 1981 17	Panserraikos	1–1	PAOK	Serres
	Anastasiadis (penalty missed) 14'; Papadimitriou 83'		Guerino 8' (pen.)	Stadium: Serres Municipal Stadium; Attendance: 7,327; Referee: Marinelis

18 January 1981 18	PAOK	3–1	Kastoria	Thessaloniki
	Kermanidis 19'; Voitsidis 49' (o.g.); Koudas 75'		Papavasiliou 5'	Stadium: Kleanthis Vikelidis Stadium; Attendance: 8,340; Referee: Charalabidis

1 February 1981 19	AEK Athens	4–0	PAOK	Athens
	Manolas 22'; Gesios 26'; Mavros 59'; Vlachos 66'; Bajević (penalty missed) 68'			Stadium: Nikos Goumas Stadium; Attendance: 21,973; Referee: Loutridis

8 February 1981 20	PAOK	5–1	AEL	Thessaloniki
	Singas 26'; Kostikos 46' (pen.), 75' (pen.); Koudas 54'; Kermanidis 80'		Charalabidis 2' (pen.)	Stadium: Toumba Stadium; Attendance: 12,230; Referee: Germanakos

18 February 1981 21	Panachaiki	2–0	PAOK	Patras
	Psarras 11'; Kizas 88' (pen.)			Stadium: Kostas Davourlis Stadium; Attendance: 5,544; Referee: Ballis

22 February 1981 22	PAOK	4–2	Korinthos	Thessaloniki
	Koudas 5', 36'; Kostikos 53' (pen.); Kermanidis 56'		Togias 41'; Gerothodoros 65' (pen.)	Stadium: Toumba Stadium; Attendance: 5,182; Referee: Koukoulakis

1 March 1981 23	PAOK	4–1	Panionios	Thessaloniki
	Kostikos 4', 19', 81'; Koudas 20'		Apostolidis 79' (o.g.)	Stadium: Toumba Stadium; Attendance: 7,395

22 March 1981 24	Panathinaikos	0–0	PAOK	Athens
				Stadium: Rizoupoli Stadium; Attendance: 11,086; Referee: Angelidis

29 March 1981 25	PAOK	1–1	PAS Giannina	Thessaloniki
	Kostikos 49' (pen.)		Singas 77' (o.g.)	Stadium: Toumba Stadium; Attendance: 8,528; Referee: Pantzalis

5 April 1981 26	Doxa Drama	0–0	PAOK	Drama
				Stadium: Doxa Drama Stadium; Referee: Dedes

12 April 1981 27	PAOK	1–1	Aris	Thessaloniki
	Singas 77'		Zindros 75'	Stadium: Toumba Stadium; Attendance: 28,157; Referee: Vourakis

19 April 1981 28	Ethnikos Piraeus	0–2	PAOK	Piraeus
			Singas 6'; Guerino 45'	Stadium: Karaiskakis Stadium; Attendance: 10,683; Referee: Koutoulas

10 May 1981 29	PAOK	1–0	OFI	Thessaloniki
	Kostikos 58'			Stadium: Toumba Stadium; Referee: Saraliotis

17 May 1981 30	Kavala	1–0	PAOK	Kavala
	Filippidis 35'			Stadium: Kavala Stadium; Attendance: 4,087

24 May 1981 31	Apollon Athens	1–0	PAOK	Athens
	Tsiggoulis 38'			Stadium: Rizoupoli Stadium; Attendance: 1,897

31 May 1981 32	PAOK	1–0	Olympiacos	Thessaloniki
	Kostikos (penalty missed) 30'; Vasilakos 67'			Stadium: Toumba Stadium; Attendance: 21,359; Referee: Fakis
Note: PAOK manager Gyula Lóránt suffered a heart attack in the 16th minute of the game and died at the bench.

7 June 1981 33	Atromitos	0–2	PAOK	Athens
			Triantafyllidis 23'; Dimopoulos 57'	Stadium: Peristeri Stadium

14 June 1981 34	PAOK	3–3	Panserraikos	Thessaloniki
	Dimopoulos 13'; Alexandridis 48', 65'		Pantazis 14', 68'; Georgiadis 20'	Stadium: Toumba Stadium; Attendance: 5,547

== Greek Cup ==
=== First round ===
29 October 1980	Niki Volos	1–1 (a.e.t.) (3–5 p)	PAOK	Nea Ionia
	Krallis 30'		Vasilakos 52'	Referee: Pantzalis
	Penalties
	Dimou (penalty scored); Fygetakis (penalty scored); Krallis (penalty missed); Stamoulakis (penalty scored); Zagavieros (penalty missed)		(penalty scored) Vasilakos; (penalty scored) Pellios; (penalty scored) Gounaris; (penalty scored) Kermanidis; (penalty scored) Alexandridis
Note: Nobody undrerstood why the referee allowed the 5th penalty of PAOK to be taken as PAOK had already won.

=== Second round ===
17 December 1980	Veria	0–2	PAOK	Veria
			Georgopoulos 61'; Alexandridis 75'	Stadium: Veria Stadium; Attendance: 6,589

=== Third round ===
6 January 1981 1st leg	PAOK	2–1	Olympiacos Volos	Thessaloniki
	Kermanidis 5'; Sarafis 38'		Trichias 51'	Stadium: Kleanthis Vikelidis Stadium

4 February 1981 2nd leg	Olympiacos Volos	1–2 (2–4 agg.)	PAOK	Volos
	Kouloglou 25'		Damanakis 4'; Kermanidis 55'	Stadium: Volos Municipal Stadium; Referee: Giannakoudakis

=== Quarter-finals ===
13 May 1981 1st leg	PAOK	5–0	Ethnikos Asteras	Thessaloniki
	Kermanidis 15'; Kostikos 25' (pen.); Koudas 52', 64'; Vasilakos 88'			Stadium: Toumba Stadium; Attendance: 2,441

27 May 1981 2nd leg	Ethnikos Asteras	2–3 (2–8 agg.)	PAOK	Athens
	Michelis 80'; Lykoudis 82'		Apostolidis 35'; Georgopoulos 44'; Triantafyllidis 78'	Stadium: Kesariani Stadium; Referee: Lagogiannis

=== Semi-finals ===
3 June 1981 1st leg	PAOK	1–0	AEK Athens	Thessaloniki
	Kostikos 38' (pen.)		Ardizoglou (penalty missed) 80'	Stadium: Toumba Stadium; Attendance: 26,674; Referee: Dedes

10 June 1981 2nd leg	AEK Athens	0–2 (0–3 agg.)	PAOK	Chalkida
			Damanakis 52'; Georgopoulos 81'	Stadium: Chalkida Municipal Stadium; Attendance: 12,736; Referee: Vardakas
Note: Match held at Chalkida because AEK had a stadium ban for the eventful match against Aris in the previous round.

=== Final ===
21 June 1981	Olympiacos	3–1	PAOK	Athens
21:30 EEST	Damanakis 18' (o.g.); Orfanos 61'; Kousoulakis 90'		Damanakis 63'	Stadium: Nikos Goumas Stadium; Attendance: 30,512; Referee: Zlatanos

== Statistics ==
=== Squad statistics ===
As of June 21, 1981

Appearances denote players in the starting lineup, with the numbers in parentheses denoting appearances as substitute.

No.	Name	Alpha Ethniki		Greek Cup		Total	
No.	Name	Apps	Goals	Apps	Goals	Apps	Goals
Goalkeepers
	(Socialist Federal Republic of Yugoslavia) Mladen Furtula	31	0	8	0	39	0
	(Greece) Apostolos Filis	4	0	2	0	6	0
Defenders
	(Greece) Ioannis Gounaris	33	0	7	0	40	0
	(Greece) Konstantinos Iosifidis	31	0	9	0	40	0
	(Hungary) József Salomon	28	0	8	0	36	0
	(Greece) Theodoros Apostolidis	22	0	5	1	27	1
	(Greece) Nikos Alavantas	12	0	2	0	14	0
	(Greece) Filotas Pellios	11	1	1	0	12	1
	(Greece) Apostolos Tsourelas	2	0	0	0	2	0
Midfielders
	(Greece) Giorgos Koudas	31	8	7	2	38	10
	(Greece) Ioannis Damanakis	25	0	8	3	33	3
	(Greece) Thomas Singas	25	3	7	0	32	3
	(Greece) Vasilios Vasilakos	22	4	7	2	29	6
	(Greece) Vasilis Georgopoulos	21	0	8	3	29	3
	(Greece) Stavros Sarafis	17	5	3	1	20	6
	(Greece) Stathis Triantafyllidis	14	3	5	1	19	4
	(Greece) Kyriakos Alexandridis	10	3	3	1	13	4
	(Greece) Angelos Anastasiadis	5	1	0	0	5	1
Forwards
	(Greece) Panagiotis Kermanidis	34	9	9	3	43	12
	(Brazil) Neto Guerino	26	2	7	0	33	2
	(Greece) Georgios Kostikos	24	9	8	2	32	11
	(Greece) Christos Dimopoulos	4	2	2	0	6	2

Source: Match reports in competitive matches, RSSSF

=== Goalscorers ===
Rank	No.	Pos.	Player	Alpha Ethniki	Greek Cup	Total
1		FW	(Greece) Panagiotis Kermanidis	9	3	12
2		FW	(Greece) Georgios Kostikos	9	2	11
3		MF	(Greece) Giorgos Koudas	8	2	10
4		MF	(Greece) Stavros Sarafis	5	1	6
4		MF	(Greece) Vasilios Vasilakos	4	2	6
6		MF	(Greece) Stathis Triantafyllidis	3	1	4
6		MF	(Greece) Kyriakos Alexandridis	3	1	4
8		MF	(Greece) Thomas Singas	3	0	3
8		MF	(Greece) Ioannis Damanakis	0	3	3
8		MF	(Greece) Vasilis Georgopoulos	0	3	3
11		FW	(Brazil) Neto Guerino	2	0	2
11		FW	(Greece) Christos Dimopoulos	2	0	2
13		DF	(Greece) Filotas Pellios	1	0	1
13		MF	(Greece) Angelos Anastasiadis	1	0	1
13		DF	(Greece) Theodoros Apostolidis	0	1	1
Own goals				2	0	2
TOTALS				52	19	71

Source: Match reports in competitive matches, RSSSF
