= Pantelakis =

Pantelakis is a surname. Notable people with the surname include:

- Giorgos Pantelakis, Former PAOK FC president
- Epaminondas Pantelakis, Greek footballer

== See also ==
- Cote Adamopoulos Pantelakis syndrome
