= Panagiotis Kermanidis =

Greek footballer

Personal information
- Date of birth: 12 July 1950 (age 76)
- Place of birth: Zgorzelec, Poland
- Position: Forward

Youth career
- Budapest Kőolaj

Senior career*
Years	Team	Apps	(Gls)
1970–1971	Kispesti Textil		
1971–1973	MTK Budapest	12	(2)
1973–1981	PAOK	233	(60)
1981–1984	Makedonikos	81	(22)
1984–1986	Naoussa		

Managerial career
- 1986–1987: Niki Volos
- 1988: Xanthi
- 1989: Anagennisi Karditsa
- 1991: Trikala
- 1992: Veria
- 1993: Eordaikos
- 1994: Trikala
- 1996: Apollon Kalamarias
- 1998–1999: Edessaikos
- 1999–2000: Edessaikos
- 2000: Poseidon Nea Michaniona
- * Club domestic league appearances and goals

Panagiotis Kermanidis (Greek: Παναγιώτης Κερμανίδης; born 12 July 1950) is a Greek former football player and manager who played as a forward.

== Career ==
Kermanidis was born on 14 July 1950, in Zgorzelec, Poland. His parents were Greek political refugees and they subsequently migrated to Hungary. He started playing football in Budapesti Köolaj and he later moved to Kispesti Textil. In 1971, he was acquired by MTK Budapest and stayed until September 1973, when he was transferred to PAOK.

At PAOK, Kermanidis won the Greek Cup in 1974 and the league title in 1976. During his 8-year stint with the club, he scored 60 goals in 233 league appearances. He also scored 12 goals in 36 Greek Cup matches and 3 goals in 17 European competitions' matches.

In 1981, Kermanidis moved to Makedonikos and played for three seasons. He was a vital member of the squad in 1982–83 season, which was the only season in the club's history that the team participated in the top-tier Alpha Ethniki. Makedonikos lost 3–2 to Panionios in a relegation play-off match that was held at Volos Municipal Stadium. He ended his career at Naoussa in 1986.

After his playing days were over, Kermanidis pursued a managerial career and coached a number of clubs including Xanthi, Trikala, Veria, Apollon Kalamarias and Edessaikos among others.

In November 2000, Panagiotis Kermanidis established his own football academy in Thessaloniki, called Bebides 2000.

== Career statistics ==
Appearances and goals by club, season and competition
Club	Season	League			Cup		Continental		Total	
Club	Season	Division	Apps	Goals	Apps	Goals	Apps	Goals	Apps	Goals
MTK Budapest	1971–72	NB I	12	2			–			
MTK Budapest	1972–73	NB I					–			
MTK Budapest	Total						–			
PAOK	1973–74	Alpha Ethniki	22	6	4	4	3	0	29	10
PAOK	1974–75	Alpha Ethniki	29	6	4	0	2	0	35	6
PAOK	1975–76	Alpha Ethniki	28	5	2	0	2	0	32	5
PAOK	1976–77	Alpha Ethniki	27	10	3	2	4	0	34	12
PAOK	1977–78	Alpha Ethniki	31	7	5	2	4	2	40	11
PAOK	1978–79	Alpha Ethniki	33	10	2	1	2	1	37	12
PAOK	1979–80	Alpha Ethniki	29	7	7	0	–		36	7
PAOK	1980–81	Alpha Ethniki	34	9	9	3	–		43	12
PAOK	Total		233	60	36	12	17	3	286	75
Makedonikos	1981–82	Beta Ethniki	37	14			–			
Makedonikos	1982–83	Alpha Ethniki	33	6			–			
Makedonikos	1983–84	Beta Ethniki	11	2			–			
Makedonikos	Total		81	22			–			
Naoussa	1984–85	Gamma Ethniki					–			
Naoussa	1985–86	Beta Ethniki					–			
Career total (Alpha Ethniki)			266	66			17	3		

Sources: RSSSF, Makedonia NLG Digital Library, uefa.com, worldfootball.net

== Honours ==
PAOK

- Alpha Ethniki: 1975–76
- Greek Cup: 1973–74

Makedonikos

- Beta Ethniki: 1981–82

== Bibliography ==
- Bliatkas, Kostas (2005). Γιώργος Κούδας, της ζωής μου το παιχνίδι [Giorgos Koudas, the game of my life] (in Greek). Greece: Ianos Publications. ISBN 978-960-7827-35-7.
- Pappous, Michalis (2019). Ο ΠΑΟΚ του '70 [The PAOK of the '70s] (in Greek). Greece: University Studio Press. ISBN 978-960-12-2421-3.
