= Giorgos Koudas =

Greek footballer

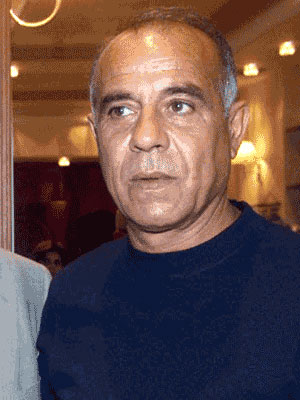
- Koudas in 2006

Personal information
- Full name: Georgios Koudas
- Date of birth: 23 November 1946 (age 79)
- Place of birth: Thessaloniki, Greece
- Height: 1.77 m (5 ft 10 in)
- Position: Attacking midfielder

Youth career
- 1958–1963: PAOK

Senior career*
Years	Team	Apps	(Gls)
1963–1984	PAOK	504	(133)

International career
1967–1982	Greece	43	(4)

Managerial career
- 1987: Iraklis
- * Club domestic league appearances and goals

Giorgos Koudas (Greek: Γιώργος Κούδας; born 23 November 1946) is a Greek former international footballer who played as an attacking midfielder. Regarded as one of the greatest Greek players of all-time, he spent his entire career at PAOK. Being the most capped player in club's history, Koudas is a figure totally linked with the White-blacks of the North. His competitiveness, leadership, creativity and huge quality as a player, along with his Macedonian heritage, gave him the nickname Alexander the Great of Greek football.

== Early life ==
Koudas was born on 23 November 1946 in Agios Pavlos, Thessaloniki. He comes from a humble, working-class background. His father Giannis worked as a waiter and was a Greek refugee from Çorlu (Greek name: Tyroloi) of Eastern Thrace, while his mother Eleftheria was from Stavroupoli of Western Thrace. He has two siblings, an older brother and a younger sister.

Koudas spent plenty of time as a youngster playing football at a sandlot near the Old Vegetable Market and also at a two-level marble square in front of Thessaloniki's Government House that does not exist nowadays. His talent was recognized by an elder neighbor named Prodromos who was a PAOK supporter and took him one day to the club's youth trials at the Toumba district where PAOK new stadium was under construction. About a hundred kids were involved and young Koudas went unnoticed on the first day. On the second day, Austrian manager Wilhelm (Willy) Sevcik asked Koudas to control the ball after he had thrown it high in the air. Koudas easily touched the ball to the ground on each throw made by the Austrian coach and participated in a half hour training game that followed. Vassilis Sidiropoulos, a PAOK administrative member at the time, took a picture of Koudas and asked him to sign a player's registration license. As a result, Koudas joined the club's youth ranks in 1958, aged 12. Because the youth team's training sessions were scheduled in the morning and in order to have some income that was much needed, Koudas attended a night school and started to work. He worked at times in an electrical workshop, a barbershop, a bakery, as well as in a Thessaloniki center hotel as a bellhop and receptionist.

== Club career ==
=== Rise to prominence followed by a two-year absence ===
Koudas started playing as a right winger, wearing the No 7 jersey in several matches held between the clubs' youth teams and preceding the senior teams' encounter. His skills and technique quickly stood out and he soon became the talk of the town. Many fans attended these exhibition youth matches in order to watch this promising youngster who could dribble past the defenders with ease and score goals. Koudas gradually shifted to the position of the attacking midfielder and made his first-team debut in December 1963, aged 17. His talent immediately started to excel and he made his breakout season in 1965–66 scoring 13 goals in 29 league appearances. However, on 14 July 1966, PAOK fans were shocked by the news of Koudas' descent to Piraeus, accompanied by his father (who was enraged with PAOK administration for financial reasons) and determined to sign for Olympiacos, who tempted him by offering a much higher annual salary, while bypassing formal negotiations with his club. PAOK administrative leader Giorgos Pantelakis never gave his consent for the transfer to be completed and for the next two seasons, Koudas participated only in Olympiacos friendly games. Military junta's General Secretary of Sports Kostas Aslanidis suggested in 1968 that Koudas should return to PAOK for two years and then move to Olympiacos, but Pantelakis refused saying "I may go to Gyaros island (place of exile for leftist political dissidents), but Koudas would never go to Olympiacos". Eventually, Koudas returned to PAOK in the summer of 1968, receiving a warm welcome by the avid fans. Fueled by this incident, Olympiacos–PAOK rivalry is considered nowadays the fiercest intercity football rivalry in Greece. For his decision to return to the team, Koudas did not speak with his father who was completely against it for 6 years. To his surprise, Koudas found out that PAOK kit man Nikiforos Tsarpanas had left his locker intact during the two years of his absence.

=== Return and identified with PAOK ===
Koudas' return to PAOK in August 1968 coincided with the arrival of quality footballers, such as Christos Terzanidis, Dimitris Paridis and Achilleas Aslanidis, while the addition of the great Stavros Sarafis had preceded it a year earlier. Wing backs Giannis Gounaris and Kostas Iosifidis were acquired in the early 1970s and a promising team that was destined to play attractive football was created. PAOK started to be competitive against the big teams from Athens and managed to win the first domestic titles in club's history. Koudas scored both goals as PAOK defeated Panathinaikos 2–1 in the 1972 Cup final and led the team to its first trophy. Over the next years, PAOK also won the 1974 Cup and the 1976 league title, but according to Koudas, the team deserved to win more trophies during the 1970s.

On 14 February 1973, PAOK faced Ajax in a friendly match at Toumba Stadium and after the game Koudas had the chance to meet in person with the great Johan Cruyff. The Flying Dutchman told Koudas that he had the quality to play in some of the top European leagues and that he could arrange to get him in touch with his father in law who was a football agent. The contact was made and Koudas was informed that a transfer to Espanyol was possible. However, according to the regulations of the time, the total amount of the transfer fee would be received by his club, while the terms of his salary at Espanyol were unclear. In contrast to what happens today, back then almost no Greek footballers crossed the border and Koudas avoided taking his chances abroad.

Koudas spent his entire football career at PAOK making 504 appearances in the top-tier Alpha Ethniki and 607 appearances in all competitions (PAOK all-time records). He scored 164 goals (133 in the league) and participated in 9 Greek Cup finals. He retired in May 1984, aged 38, serving for over 20 years at PAOK.

== International career ==
Koudas had 43 caps for the Greece national team, scoring four goals, between 1967 and 1982. He participated in the UEFA Euro 1980 that was held in Italy, playing in the 0–0 group stage draw against West Germany.

On 20 September 1995, eleven years after he had retired, a testimonial match in his honour was held at Toumba Stadium and Koudas made a final appearance for the national team facing Yugoslavia. That made him the oldest footballer (aged 48) to feature in a competitive international game until George Weah (aged 51) beat the record in September 2018. This also allowed him to set the record for the longest European international span between the first and last cap at 27 years and 10 months, surpassing the previous record set by Billy Meredith at nearly 25 years, as well as the second-longest span in the world, only behind Alderney's Billy Bohan with 27 years and 339 days. After the final whistle, his bust on Toumba Stadium's football pitch (next to the entrance of the players' tunnel) was unveiled and Koudas was brought into tears.

== Other football-related activities ==
Koudas retired in May 1984 and he was soon assigned by PAOK FC president Pantelakis as the team's general manager for the 1984–85 season that ended with PAOK winning their second league title in club's history.

In 1987, Koudas founded the Neapoli Football Academy G. Koudas in the Neapoli district of Thessaloniki. Notably, former Greek international and PAOK forward Dimitris Salpingidis began his youth football career at Koudas' academy in 1995 before being recruited by PAOK's youth system.

In September 1987, for a short period of time (three league matches), Koudas was the co-manager of Iraklis along with Kostas Aidiniou.

In August 2012, Ivan Savvidis became PAOK FC major shareholder and since late 2015 Koudas is one of his advisors.

Koudas is one of the co-founders of the Arsakli football academy, founded in 2015, in Panorama, Thessaloniki alongside Vasilis Vasilakos, Kostas Orfanos, Neto Guerino, Koulis Apostolidis and others.

== Style of play and personality ==
"Off the field, Koudas was the footballer-aristocrat. His appearance, the way he behaved in the hotels, wherever we went, his reaction was always that of a mature man. He was like that from a very young age."

— Giorgos Pantelakis, former PAOK FC president
Bliatkas, Kostas. Giorgos Koudas - The game of my life. Ianos publications, 2005, p. 39.

"Talent. Virtue. Longevity."

— Giannis Diakogiannis, sports journalist
Bliatkas, Kostas. Giorgos Koudas - The game of my life. Ianos publications, 2005, p. 226.

Regarded as one of the greatest Greek players of all-time (ranked 5th by the Hellenic Football Federation for the UEFA Jubilee Awards in 2003), Koudas rightfully earned the appreciation of all Greek football fans. The team orchestrator, Koudas was a creative playmaker with a gift for timing passes. He was known for his technical ability, dribbling and vision, possessing an awareness of his teammates' positions as an attack unfolded. Koudas has stated that winger Dimitris Paridis was his alter ego inside the football field. "My long ball passes found him with absolute precision. He knew when to start. I knew that he would meet the ball. Our thoughts were aligned perfectly". He has also admitted that he was able to focus more on the attack thanks to his teammate Christos Terzanidis who was a tireless defensive midfielder and always urged him to go forward. As for his cooperation in the midfield with PAOK record goalscorer Stavros Sarafis, Koudas has said: "Stavros was a big asset for the team. It was such his heading ability, that you only needed to deliver a decent cross inside the area and he would most likely find the net". One of Koudas' nicknames as a footballer was The Deer (Greek: Ζαρκάδι) due to his distinctive way of running with the ball keeping his head up and having a large stride. A versatile attacking midfielder and a capable goalscorer with a good right foot shot, Koudas was a team leader, always inspiring his teammates to give their best. He was also a role model for the youngsters, as he never provoked the opposing players or fans and had a gentle personality.

Koudas became the inspiration for a popular song by the Greek songwriter and PAOK supporter Nikos Papazoglou and lyricist Manolis Rasoulis.

== Career statistics ==
=== Club career ===
Appearances and goals by season and competition
Club	Season	Greek League		Greek Cup		Continental (Note: Includes the Inter-Cities Fairs Cup apps.)		Total	
Club	Season	Apps	Goals	Apps	Goals	Apps	Goals	Apps	Goals
PAOK	1963–64	13	2	2	0	–		15	2
PAOK	1964–65	17	1	1	0	–		18	1
PAOK	1965–66	29	13	1	0	2	1	32	14
PAOK	1966–67 (Note: Koudas did not play for 2 seasons when Olympiacos attempted to acquire him from PAOK.)	0	0	0	0	–		0	0
PAOK	1967–68	0	0	0	0	0	0	0	0
PAOK	1968–69	29	20	3	6	–		32	26
PAOK	1969–70	24	8	5	3	–		29	11
PAOK	1970–71	30	7	5	1	2	1	37	9
PAOK	1971–72	34	7	6	3	–		40	10
PAOK	1972–73	31	14	5	0	2	0	38	14
PAOK	1973–74	26	3	6	5	3	0	35	8
PAOK	1974–75	24	8	1	0	2	0	27	8
PAOK	1975–76	26	14	3	0	2	1	31	15
PAOK	1976–77	26	6	4	1	4	1	34	8
PAOK	1977–78	31	5	5	1	4	0	40	6
PAOK	1978–79	26	4	0	0	2	0	28	4
PAOK	1979–80	26	2	4	1	–		30	3
PAOK	1980–81	31	8	7	2	–		38	10
PAOK	1981–82	32	5	5	2	2	0	39	7
PAOK	1982–83	28	4	3	2	4	0	35	6
PAOK	1983–84	21	2	4	0	4	0	29	2
Career total		504	133	70	27	33	4	607	164

=== International career ===
National team	Year	Caps	Goals
Greece
Greece	1967	1	0
Greece	1968	2	0
Greece	1969	3	1
Greece	1970	6	0
Greece	1971	5	0
Greece	1972	4	0
Greece	1973	4	1
Greece	1975	3	0
Greece	1976	1	1
Greece	1977	3	0
Greece	1978	2	1
Greece	1979	1	0
Greece	1980	2	0
Greece	1981	4	0
Greece	1982	1	0
Greece	1995 (Note: 20 September 1995, Toumba Stadium, Greece–Yugoslavia 0–2. Farewell match in his honour.)	1	0
Total		43	4

List of international goals scored by Giorgos Koudas
No.	Date	Venue	Opponent	Score	Result	Competition
1	15 October 1969	Kaftanzoglio Stadium, Thessaloniki	Switzerland	1–0	4–1	1970 FIFA World Cup qualification
2	17 January 1973	Leoforos Alexandras Stadium, Athens	Spain	1–1	2–3	1974 FIFA World Cup qualification
3	6 May 1976	Leoforos Alexandras Stadium, Athens	Poland	1–0	1–0	Friendly
4	13 December 1978	Leoforos Alexandras Stadium, Athens	Romania	1–0	2–1	Balkan Cup

== Honours ==
PAOK

- Alpha Ethniki: 1975–76
- Greek Cup: 1971–72, 1973–74

Greece U23

- Balkan Youth Championship: 1969

Individual

- Most appearances in all competitions (PAOK): 607
- Most league appearances for PAOK: 504
- Most Greek league appearances for the same club (PAOK): 504

== Bibliography ==
- Bliatkas, Kostas (2005). Γιώργος Κούδας, της ζωής μου το παιχνίδι [Giorgos Koudas, the game of my life] (in Greek). Greece: Ianos Publications. ISBN 978-960-7827-35-7.
- Pappous, Michalis (2019). Ο ΠΑΟΚ του '70 [The PAOK of the '70s] (in Greek). Greece: University Studio Press. ISBN 978-960-12-2421-3.

== See also ==
- List of one-club men in association football
