= Stavros Sarafis =

Greek footballer (1950–2022)

Personal information
- Date of birth: 17 January 1950
- Place of birth: Epanomi, Thessaloniki, Greece
- Date of death: 13 October 2022 (aged 72)
- Place of death: Thessaloniki, Greece
- Position: Central midfielder

Youth career
- 1963–1967: Anagennisi Epanomi

Senior career*
Years	Team	Apps	(Gls)
1967–1981	PAOK	358	(136)

International career
1969–1977	Greece	32	(7)

Managerial career
- 1989: PAOK (caretaker)
- 1994: PAOK (caretaker)
- 1995: PAOK (caretaker)
- 1999: PAOK (caretaker)
- 2006: PAOK (caretaker)
- 2010–2013: PAOK (youth)
- * Club domestic league appearances and goals

Stavros Sarafis (Greek: Σταύρος Σαράφης; 17 January 1950 – 13 October 2022) was a Greek international footballer who played as a midfielder and spent his entire career at PAOK. A versatile midfielder and prolific goalscorer, he was mostly renowned for his excellent abilities in the air, being able to deliver powerful headers towards goal. Regarded as one of the club's most iconic figures, Sarafis is PAOK record top goalscorer. His nickname was "Ceasar" (Greek: "Kaisaras").

== Club career ==
"I have no complaints. In life, it’s not just money that counts and you can’t buy everything with it. I am very content with everything I went through and am still experiencing at PAOK, and with the fact that this club's door is always open for me. Money eventually runs out. The love of the fans is what remains."

— Stavros Sarafis
Makedonia newspaper (4 September 2008)

"If I had Koudas and Sarafis in Panathinaikos, we would have beaten Ajax at Wembley and won the 1971 European Cup."

— Ferenc Puskás
Ta Nea newspaper (10 November 1992)

Sarafis was born in Epanomi, on the outskirts of Thessaloniki in 1950 and at the age of 13 he began his football career with Anagennisi Epanomi, while when he turned 16, he was called up for a match with the Greek Youth National Team. In the summer of 1967, at the age of 17, he was transferred to PAOK, who fought with city rivals Aris for his acquisition. He made his PAOK debut in the league match against Egaleo (October 8, 1967) and in the 72nd minute, he scored his first goal and paved the way for the 2–0 victory. Sarafis spent his entire football career at the Double-headed eagle of the North and wore the No 8 white-black jersey for 14 years, retiring in 1981. In the summer of 1976, when his contract was expiring, AEK Athens president Loukas Barlos offered him 5 million drachmas to join the Double-headed eagle of the South, however Sarafis turned down the offer and decided to stay at his beloved PAOK despite the fact that he was informed by PAOK president Giorgos Pantelakis that the club could afford to offer him only 1 million drachmas. Sarafis was a prolific goalscorer with an incredible heading ability, netting 136 goals in 358 league matches with PAOK. He also scored 26 goals in the Greek Cup and 7 in UEFA competitions, for 169 goals in total. His partnership with Giorgos Koudas was one of the most prominent midfield duos in Greek football during the 1970s, winning one league title (1976) and two Cups (1972, 1974).

On 26 August 1981, a testimonial match was held in his honour at Toumba Stadium between PAOK and the Greece national team (2–1), where he was awarded by PAOK, the Hellenic Football Federation (HFF), the Panhellenic Footballers' Association (PSAP) and the Macedonia Football Clubs Association.

After finishing his football career, he continued serving the club from various positions, including caretaker and assistant manager for the first team and also coaching and scouting for the PAOK Academy.

== International career ==
Sarafis had 32 caps for the Greece national team between 1969 and 1977, scoring 7 goals.

== Death ==
On 17 September 2022, Sarafis suffered a stroke and he was admitted to the AHEPA Hospital. He died on 13 October 2022, at the age of 72. Upon the news of his death, the Toumba Stadium's flags were at half-mast as a sign of mourning.

== Career statistics ==
=== Club career ===
Appearances and goals by season and competition
Club	Season	Greek League		Greek Cup		Continental (Note: Includes the Inter-Cities Fairs Cup apps.)		Total	
Club	Season	Apps	Goals	Apps	Goals	Apps	Goals	Apps	Goals
PAOK	1967–68	25	5	5	2	2	0	32	7
PAOK	1968–69	33	9	3	2	–		36	11
PAOK	1969–70	31	17	4	4	–		35	21
PAOK	1970–71	26	5	4	2	2	0	32	7
PAOK	1971–72	21	10	5	2	–		26	12
PAOK	1972–73	28	19	6	5	1	1	35	25
PAOK	1973–74	28	12	4	2	6	3	38	17
PAOK	1974–75	27	15	3	0	2	0	32	15
PAOK	1975–76	24	11	1	0	2	0	27	11
PAOK	1976–77	31	8	5	0	4	2	40	10
PAOK	1977–78	21	5	6	3	0	0	27	8
PAOK	1978–79	30	11	2	2	2	1	34	14
PAOK	1979–80	16	4	3	1	–		19	5
PAOK	1980–81	17	5	3	1	–		20	6
Career total		358	136	54	26	21	7	433	169

Sources: RSSSF, Makedonia NLG Digital Library, uefa.com, worldfootball.net

=== International career ===
National team	Year	Caps	Goals
Greece
Greece	1969	3	0
Greece	1971	3	0
Greece	1972	4	1
Greece	1973	4	1
Greece	1974	7	3
Greece	1975	4	2
Greece	1976	3	0
Greece	1977	4	0
Total		32	7

List of international goals scored by Stavros Sarafis
No.	Date	Venue	Opponent	Score	Result	Competition
1	2 September 1972	Karaiskakis Stadium, Piraeus	France	1–1	1–3	Friendly
2	31 January 1973	Nikos Goumas Stadium, Athens	Bulgaria	1–0	2–2	Friendly
3	29 May 1974	Stadionul Național, Bucharest	Romania	1–1	1–3	Balkan Cup
4	15 November 1974	Karaiskakis Stadium, Piraeus	Cyprus	2–1	3–1	Friendly
5	18 December 1974	Karaiskakis Stadium, Piraeus	Bulgaria	1–0	2–1	UEFA Euro 1976 qualifying
6	24 September 1975	Kaftanzoglio Stadium, Thessaloniki	Romania	1–1	1–1	Balkan Cup
7	30 December 1975	Stadio Comunale, Florence	Italy	2–2	2–3	Friendly

== Honours ==
PAOK

- Alpha Ethniki: 1975–76
- Greek Cup: 1971–72, 1973–74

Greece U23

- Balkan Youth Championship: 1969

Individual

- PAOK record top goalscorer: 169 goals
- PAOK record league top goalscorer: 136 goals

== See also ==
- List of one-club men in association football

== Bibliography ==
- Bliatkas, Kostas (2005). Γιώργος Κούδας, της ζωής μου το παιχνίδι [Giorgos Koudas, the game of my life] (in Greek). Greece: Ianos Publications. ISBN 978-960-7827-35-7.
- Pappous, Michalis (2019). Ο ΠΑΟΚ του '70 [The PAOK of the '70s] (in Greek). Greece: University Studio Press. ISBN 978-960-12-2421-3.
