= 1973–74 Greek Football Cup =

1973–74 Greek Cup
Tournament details
- Country: Greece
- Teams: 79

Final positions
- Champions: PAOK (2nd title)
- Runners-up: Olympiacos

Tournament statistics
- Matches played: 72
- Goals scored: 199 (2.76 per match)
- Top goal scorer(s): Yves Triantafyllos (7 goals)

The 1973–74 Greek Football Cup was the 32nd edition of the Greek Football Cup. The competition culminated with the Greek Cup Final, held at AEK Stadium on 16 June 1974. The match was contested by PAOK and Olympiacos, with PAOK winning by 4–3 on penalty shoot-out, after a 2–2 draw between the two teams.

== Calendar ==
Round	Date(s)	Fixtures	Clubs	New entries
Qualifying Round	9 September 1973	13	79 → 65	28
Additional Round	1973	1	65 → 64	1
First Round	26 December 1973	28	64 → 32	50
Round of 32	23 January 1974	15	32 → 16	none
Round of 16	24 February 1974	8	16 → 8	none
Quarter-finals	10 April 1974	4	8 → 4	none
Semi-finals	8 May 1974	2	4 → 2	none
Final	16 June 1974	1	2 → 1	none

== Qualifying round ==
28 clubs from Beta Ethniki entered the qualification round.

Team 1	Score	Team 2
Panetolikos	4–1	Anagennisi Arta
Ikaros Nea Smyrni	1–1 (5–3 p)	Panaspropyrgiakos
Korinthos	0–2	Panelefsiniakos
Panarkadikos	1–0	Panegialios
Koropi	0–0 (3–4 p)	Aias Salamina
Vyzas Megara	2–1	Argonaftis
Rodos	1–0	Phoebus Kremasti
Ionikos	1–1 (2–4 p)	Acharnaikos
Proodeftiki	1–0	Kallithea
Achilleas Farsala	2–1	Anagennisi Giannitsa
Nestos Chrysoupoli	0–2 (w/o)^{*}	Pandramaikos
Edessaikos	2–1	Almopos Aridea
Makedonikos	1–1 (3–5 p)	Foinikas Polichni
Niki Polygyros	0–5	Moudania

^{*}The match ended 4–2 for Nestos Chrysoupoli, but it was awarded to Pandramaikos.

== Additional round ==
Team 1	Score	Team 2
Pandramaikos	1–0	Ethnikos Alexandroupoli

== Knockout phase ==
In the knockout phase, teams play against each other over a single match. If the match ends up as a draw, extra time will be played. If a winner doesn't occur after the extra time the winner emerges by penalty shoot-out.
The mechanism of the draws for each round is as follows:

- In the draw for the first round, the teams from the first division are seeded and the teams that passed the qualification round are unseeded. The seeded teams are drawn against the unseeded teams in their respective region. (The teams from Southern Greece form the first group and the teams from Central and Northern Greece form the second group.)
- In the draw for the Round of 32, there are no seedings and teams from the different group can be drawn against each other in their respective region.
- In the draws for the Round of 16 onwards, there are no geographical criteria and teams from different regions can be drawn against each other.

== Bracket ==
First round
Apollon Athens	2
A.O. Syros	0
Aias Salamina (a.e.t.)	2
Chania	0
Pierikos	3
Foinikas Polichni	1
Olympiacos Volos	2
Anagennisi Karditsa	1
Kerkyra	1
Panetolikos	2
PAS Giannina	2
A.O. Karditsa	0
Lamia	3
Niki Volos	0
Chalkida	1
Veria	0
PAOK	5
Kastoria	0
Moudania	2
Kilkisiakos	1
AEK Athens	3
Olympiacos Liosia	0
Atromitos	0
Paniliakos	1
Doxa Drama (a.e.t.)	2
Panserraikos	1
Kavala	4
Panthrakikos	0
Fostiras	3
Acharnaikos	1
Egaleo	3
Rodos	2
Olympiacos	3
Petralona	0
Proodeftiki	2
Pannafpliakos	0
Iraklis	3
Xanthi	0
Trikala	4
Achilleas Farsala	0
Ethnikos Piraeus (w/o)	2
Apollon Mytilene	0
Ilisiakos (p)	0(4)
Atromitos Piraeus	0(3)
Panionios (w/o)	2
APOEL	0
OFI (w/o)	2
Vyzas Megara	0
Panachaiki	2
Panarkadikos	0
Panelefsiniakos	1
Panargiakos (a.e.t.)	2
AEL	3
Levadiakos	2
Anagennisi Epanomi	1
Apollon Kalamarias	0
Aris	4
Pandramaikos	0
Naoussa	1
Edessaikos	0
Panathinaikos	4
P.A.O. Rouf	0
Kalamata (w/o)	2
Ikaros Nea Smyrni	0

Round of 32
Apollon Athens	4
Aias Salamina	1
Pierikos	2
Olympiacos Volos	1
Panetolikos	0
PAS Giannina	1
Lamia	1(1)
Chalkida (p)	1(4)
PAOK	7
Moudania	2
AEK Athens (p)	0(4)
Atromitos	0(3)
Doxa Drama (p)	0(8)
Kavala	0(7)
Fostiras	1
Egaleo	4
Olympiacos	5
Proodeftiki	2
Iraklis	3
Trikala	1
Ethnikos Piraeus (w/o)	2
Ilisiakos	0
Panionios	2
OFI	0
Panachaiki	4
Panargiakos	1
AEL	3
Anagennisi Epanomi	0
Aris	3
Naoussa	1
Panathinaikos	6
Kalamata	1

Round of 16
Apollon Athens	0(2)
Pierikos (p)	0(3)
PAS Giannina	2
Chalkida	1
PAOK	3
AEK Athens	1
Doxa Drama (w/o)	0
Egaleo	2
Olympiacos	3
Iraklis	0
Ethnikos Piraeus	0(2)
Panionios (p)	0(4)
Panachaiki	2
AEL	0
Aris	0
Panathinaikos	1

Quarter-finals
Pierikos	2
PAS Giannina	1
PAOK	2
Egaleo	0
Olympiacos	3
Panionios	0
Panachaiki	1
Panathinaikos (a.e.t.)	2

Semi-finals
Pierikos	0
PAOK	1
Olympiacos	1
Panathinaikos	0

Final
PAOK (p)	2(4)
Olympiacos	2(3)

== First round ==
18 clubs from Alpha Ethniki and 32 clubs from Beta Ethniki entered the first round.

Team 1	Score	Team 2
Panachaiki	2–0	Panarkadikos
Proodeftiki	2–0	Pannafpliakos
Panathinaikos	4–0	P.A.O. Rouf
Ethnikos Piraeus	2–0 (w/o)	Apollon Mytilene
Olympiacos	3–0	Petralona
Kalamata	2–0 (w/o)	Ikaros Nea Smyrni
AEK Athens	3–0	Olympiakos Neon Liosion
Panelefsiniakos	1–2 (a.e.t.)	Panargiakos
Apollon Athens	2–0	A.O. Syros
Aias Salamina	2–0 (a.e.t.)	Chania
Egaleo	3–2	Rodos
Panionios	2–0 (w/o)	APOEL
Ilisiakos	0–0 (4–3 p)	Atromitos Piraeus
Atromitos	4–0	Paniliakos
OFI	2–0 (w/o)	Vyzas Megara
Fostiras	3–1	Acharnaikos
Kerkyra	1–2	Panetolikos
PAS Giannina	2–0	A.O. Karditsa
Trikala	4–0	Achilleas Farsala
Lamia	3–0	Niki Volos
AEL	3–2	Levadiakos
Doxa Drama	2–1 (a.e.t.)	Panserraikos
Chalkida	1–0	Veria
Olympiacos Volos	2–1	Anagennisi Karditsa
Moudania	2–1	Kilkisiakos
Anagennisi Epanomi	1–0	Apollon Kalamarias
Iraklis	3–0	Xanthi
PAOK	5–0	Kastoria
Naoussa	1–0	Edessaikos
Kavala	4–0	Panthrakikos
Aris	4–0	Pandramaikos
Pierikos	3–1	Foinikas Polichni

== Round of 32 ==
Team 1	Score	Team 2
Panionios	2–0	OFI
Olympiacos	5–2	Proodeftiki
Apollon Athens	4–1	Aias Salamina
Fostiras	1–4	Egaleo
AEK Athens	0–0 (4–3 p)	Atromitos
Panathinaikos	6–1	Kalamata
Panachaiki	4–1	Panargiakos
Ethnikos Piraeus	2–0 (w/o)	Ilisiakos
Panetolikos	0–1	PAS Giannina
Lamia	1–1 (1–4 p)	Chalkida
AEL	3–0	Anagennisi Epanomi
Pierikos	2–1	Olympiacos Volos
Iraklis	3–1	Trikala
PAOK	7–2	Moudania
Doxa Drama	0–0 (8–7 p)	Kavala
Aris	3–1	Naoussa

== Round of 16 ==
Team 1	Score	Team 2
PAOK	3–1	AEK Athens
PAS Giannina	2–1	Chalkida
Olympiacos	3–0	Iraklis
Doxa Drama	0–2 (w/o)^{*}	Egaleo
Apollon Athens	0–0 (2–3 p)	Pierikos
Aris	0–1	Panathinaikos
Panachaiki	2–0	AEL
Ethnikos Piraeus	0–0 (2–4 p)	Panionios

^{*}The match ended 1–1 in the regular time and Doxa Drama won 7–6 on penalties, but it was awarded 0–2 to Egaleo.

== Quarter-finals ==
Team 1	Score	Team 2
Pierikos	2–1	PAS Giannina
Olympiacos	3–0	Panionios
Panachaiki	1–2 (a.e.t.)	Panathinaikos
PAOK	2–0	Egaleo

== Semi-finals ==
Team 1	Score	Team 2
Pierikos	0–1^{*}	PAOK
Olympiacos	1–0	Panathinaikos

^{*}Held at Kaftanzoglio Stadium.

== Final ==
16 June 1974

PAOK	2–2 (a.e.t.)	Olympiacos
Paridis 50'; Aslanidis 72' (pen.)	Report	Triantafyllos 19'; Kritikopoulos 79'
Penalties
Sarafis (penalty scored); Paridis (penalty scored); Koudas (penalty missed); Anastasiadis (penalty scored); Apostolidis (penalty scored)	4–3	(penalty scored) Papadimitriou; (penalty missed) Poupakis; (penalty missed) Persidis; (penalty scored) Glezos; (penalty scored) Siokos

AEK Stadium, Nea Filadelfia
Attendance: 28,000
Referee: Walter Hungerbühler (Switzerland)
