= René Deck =

Swiss footballer (born 1945)

Personal information
- Full name: René Deck
- Date of birth: 8 June 1945 (age 81)
- Place of birth: Switzerland
- Height: 1.84 m (6 ft 1/2 in)
- Position: Goalkeeper

Senior career*
Years	Team	Apps	(Gls)
1966–1967	Wettingen		
1967–1974	Grasshopper	193	(0)
1974–1975	PAOK	31	(0)
1975–1976	VfB Stuttgart	5	(0)
1976–1980	Winterthur		

International career
1971–1973	Switzerland	7	(0)
- * Club domestic league appearances and goals

René Deck (born 8 June 1945) was a Swiss international footballer who played as a goalkeeper for a number of clubs in Switzerland, Greece and Germany.

== Club career ==
Deck began his career in Switzerland, playing several seasons with Grasshopper Club Zürich. He won the goalkeeper of the year award three times.

Deck moved to Greece to play in the Greek first division with PAOK in the summer of 1974. The following season, he joined German second division side VfB Stuttgart.

== International career ==
Deck made seven appearances for the Switzerland national football team.
