= Football Cup of Greater Greece =

The Football Cup of Greater Greece (Greek: Κύπελλο Μεγάλης Ελλάδος) (officially the Cup of Friendship between Mother Greece and Daughter Cyprus (Greek: Κύπελλο Φιλίας Μητρός Ελλάδος και Θυγατρός Κύπρου)) was a two match competition held usually during the Easter period and contested by previous season's winners of the Cypriot Cup and the Greek Cup. It was held between 1969 and 1976.

== Winners ==
Year	Winner	Score	Runner-up	Notes
1968–69	Olympiacos	7–4 (aggregate)	APOEL	Olympiacos drew 2–2 in Cyprus and won 5–2 in Greece.
1969–70	Panathinaikos	6–2 (aggregate)	APOEL	Panathinaikos won 1–5 in Cyprus and drew 1–1 in Greece.
1970–71	Aris	3–2 (aggregate)	Pezoporikos Larnaca	Aris won 0–1 in Cyprus and drew 2–2 in Greece.
1971–72	Olympiacos	5–2 (aggregate)	Anorthosis	Olympiacos won 0–1 in Cyprus and 4–2 in Greece.
1972–73	PAOK	4–3 (aggregate)	Omonia	PAOK drew 1–1 in Cyprus and won 3–2 in Greece.
1973–74	Not held (Olympiacos were the Greek Cup winners and APOEL were the Cypriot Cup winners)			
1974–75	Not held (PAOK were the Greek Cup winners and Omonia were the Cypriot Cup winners)			
1975–76	Olympiacos	10–3 (aggregate)	Anorthosis	Olympiacos won 2–1 in Cyprus and 8–2 in Greece.

== Cypriot clubs in the Greek league ==
Also, from 1967 until 1974, the Cypriot Champions were promoted to the Greek First National Division and in case of relegation, they were replaced by the Cypriot Champions of the next season. Cypriot clubs were relegated every season from the Alpha Ethniki, apart from 1974, when APOEL managed to remain in the Greek Championship. However, due to the Turkish invasion of Cyprus that year, APOEL withdrew from the League.

== See also ==
- Super League Greece
- Greek Football Cup
- Cypriot First Division
- Cypriot Cup
