= Ioannis Stefas =

Greek footballer (1948–2010)

Personal information
- Date of birth: 28 October 1948
- Place of birth: Korinthos, Greece
- Date of death: 17 July 2010 (aged 61)
- Place of death: Athens, Greece
- Height: 1.80 m (5 ft 11 in)
- Position: Goalkeeper

Senior career*
Years	Team	Apps	(Gls)
–1972	Korinthos		
1972–1975	PAOK	49	(0)
1975–1982	Korinthos		
- * Club domestic league appearances and goals

Ioannis Stefas (Greek: Γιάννης Στέφας; 28 October 1948 – 17 July 2010) was a Greek professional footballer who played as a goalkeeper for a number of clubs including PAOK and Korinthos.

Stefas began his career with local club Korinthos. He played in the Greek first division with PAOK from 1972 to 1975, before returning to Korinthos where he finished his career.
