= Eleftherios Poupakis =

Greek footballer

Lefteris Poupakis
Personal information
- Full name: Eleftherios Poupakis
- Date of birth: 28 December 1946 (age 79)
- Place of birth: Perama, Rethymno, Greece
- Height: 1.82 m (6 ft 0 in)
- Position: Goalkeeper

Youth career
- Thriamvos Athens

Senior career*
Years	Team	Apps	(Gls)
1966–1973	Egaleo		
1973–1978	Olympiacos		
1978–1981	OFI		
1981–1982	Panathinaikos		
1983–1984	Olympiacos		
1984–1985	Apollon Athens		

International career
1971–1981	Greece	6	(0)
- * Club domestic league appearances and goals

Eleftherios "Lefteris" Poupakis (Greek: Ελευθέριος "Λευτέρης" Πουπάκης; born 28 February 1946) is a retired Greek footballer who played as a goalkeeper.

During his career he played for Egaleo, Olympiacos, OFI, Panathinaikos and Apollon Athens. He earned six caps for the Greece national football team, and participated in UEFA Euro 1980.
