= Filotas Pellios =

Greek footballer

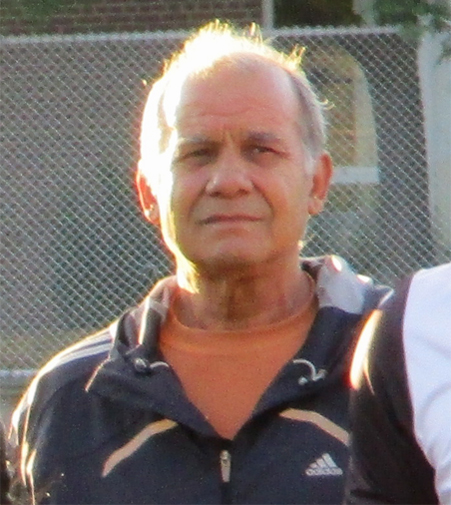
- Pellios in 2017

Personal information
- Full name: Filotas Pellios
- Date of birth: 22 March 1953 (age 73)
- Place of birth: Kymina, Greece
- Height: 1.80 m (5 ft 11 in)
- Position: Centre back

Youth career
- 1966–1969: Olympiakos Kymina
- 1969–1972: PAOK

Senior career*
Years	Team	Apps	(Gls)
1972–1984	PAOK	222	(4)

International career
1975–1978	Greece	5	(0)
- * Club domestic league appearances and goals

Filotas Pellios (Greek: Φιλώτας Πέλλιος; born 22 March 1953) is a retired Greek footballer. He is president of the PAOK veterans association.

== Career ==
Pellios started his career in the academies of Olympiakos Kymina at the age of 13 and continued in PAOK at the age of 16. In 1972, he was promoted to the PAOK senior side where he played for fifteen years. He won the Greek Cup in 1974 and the Greek Championship in 1976, recording 222 league appearances and 4 goals in total for PAOK.

Pellios made thirty-five caps for the Greece youth national team and five for the senior Greece national team.

== Honours ==
PAOK

- Greek Cup: 1973–74
- Alpha Ethniki: 1975–76
