= Giorgos Pantelakis =

Former PAOK FC president

- Born: 30 November 1926; Thessaloniki, Greece
- Died: 2 February 2009 (aged 82)
- Known for: Former president of PAOK FC

Giorgos Pantelakis (Greek: Γιώργος Παντελάκης; 30 November 1926 – 2 February 2009) was a former PAOK FC president and one of the most iconic figures in club's history.

== Early life ==
Pantelakis was born on 30 November 1926 in the Toumba district of Thessaloniki. His father Dimitrios and his mother Evangelia were Greek refugees who came from Smyrni in Asia Minor. He studied at the Public Commercial School of Thessaloniki and, after graduating, he successfully engaged in trade business (sanitary products).

== President of PAOK FC ==
From a young age Pantelakis joined the A.C. PAOK (Greek: Α.Σ. Π.Α.Ο.Κ.) multi-sport club family and served it in various administrative positions. Initially in the basketball department (PAOK BC) from 1954 to 1959, winning the first Panhellenic title (1959) in PAOK's history.

"In critical moments of my life, he was by my side, always with a sound advice. He was a fair, reasonable and sincere man with a life plan and a vision for PAOK and sports."

— PAOK FC legend Giorgos Koudas
Bliatkas, Kostas. Giorgos Koudas - The game of my life. Ianos publications, 2005, p. 178.

From 1960 to 1971 he was General Secretary and then President of PAOK FC from 1975 to 1984. During this tenure, as head of the football team, PAOK won the Greek Championship for the first time (1976). He played a leading role in the Giorgos Koudas affair in the late 1960s, contributing to the return of the skilful player to the team and was the one who, with his foresight, created PAOK's great team of the 1970s. In July 1966, Koudas was approached by Olympiacos, who tempted him by offering a much higher annual salary without going into a negotiation with his club. Pantelakis never gave his consent for the transfer to be completed and for the next two seasons, Koudas participated only in Olympiacos friendly games. Military junta's General Secretary of Sports Kostas Aslanidis suggested in 1968 that Koudas should return to PAOK for two years and then move to Olympiacos, but Pantelakis refused saying "I may go to Gyaros island (place of exile for leftist political dissidents), but Koudas would never go to Olympiacos". Koudas' return to PAOK in August 1968 coincided with the arrival of quality footballers, such as Christos Terzanidis, Dimitris Paridis and Achilleas Aslanidis, while the addition of the great Stavros Sarafis had preceded it a year earlier. Pantelakis had now laid the foundations for the creation of a promising team that was destined to play attractive football over the next decade and to be competitive against the big teams from Athens winning the first domestic titles in club's history. Giorgos Pantelakis established himself in the minds of all sports fans as a charismatic, reliable and dynamic sportsman and a symbol of dedication to the club he served for decades, sealing with his profound personality a great and glorious part of its history. He dedicated his entire life to sports and to PAOK.

=== Associates and staff during his term of office ===
Many people were linked with Pantelakis and had a long-standing presence and contribution to the club during his term of office.

- Associates/co-funders/board members: Dimitris Dimadis - Vassilis Zervas - Evangelos Mylonas (former A.C. PAOK presidents), Vassilis Sergiannidis (general secretary), Giorgos Mamidakis (vice-president), Nikos Vezyrtzis - Apostolos Alexopoulos (board members then, PAOK BC presidents later), Petros Kalafatis (general manager), Sofoklis Martinidis - Lazaros Tsomos - Chronis Petridis (administrators), Thanassis Mantas, Dimitris Doumtsos, Nikos Koulouris, Giorgos Kasimatis, Ioannis Vranialis, Stratos Simitzis, Nikos Zelomosidis.
- Staff: Panagiotis Gigis (doctor), Evangelos Stamos (physio), Aristarchos Agriogiannis (masseur), Nikiforos Tsarpanas (kit man), Vassilis Sidiropoulos (special duties office), Antonis Taskonidis - Stavros Filoxenidis (team supervisors), Giorgos Makridis (accountant), Argyris Karelis (in charge of gate receipts), Dimitris Ioannidis (stadium security guard).

== Death and legacy ==
"As a person, I always rely on history. And for me, Pantelakis is that figure who deserves my attention and the desire to be better than him, not worse."

— PAOK FC owner Ivan Savvidis
Unveiling of Giorgos Pantelakis' bust at PAOK FC headquarters (3 November 2016)

On 2 February 2009, Pantelakis was run over by a passing motorbike in Thessaloniki center and was transported to Ippokrateio General Hospital with a severe head injury. He did not manage to recover and succumbed to his injuries the same day, dying at the age of 82. According to his will, his entire estate was donated to charitable projects. His funds were used for the creation of the pediatric oncology clinic at the AHEPA Hospital, with instructions that his donation would not be revealed until the whole work was completed. Two ambulances were gifted to the Hellenic National Center of Emergency Care and a sports center (including a football and a basketball field) was built in the school facilities of the Children's Heritage Foundation at Thermi. On 3 November 2016, with a modest ceremony, unveiling of the bust of the late Georgios Pantelakis took place at the PAOK FC headquarters. The bust was placed next to PAOK trophy cabinet at the entrance of the administration offices.

== Bibliography ==
- Bliatkas, Kostas (2005). Γιώργος Κούδας, της ζωής μου το παιχνίδι [Giorgos Koudas, the game of my life] (in Greek). Greece: Ianos Publications. ISBN 978-960-7827-35-7.
- Pappous, Michalis (2019). Ο ΠΑΟΚ του '70 [The PAOK of the '70s] (in Greek). Greece: University Studio Press. ISBN 978-960-12-2421-3.
