= Michalis Kritikopoulos =

Greek footballer (1946–2002)

Personal information
- Full name: Michail Kritikopoulos
- Date of birth: 3 January 1946
- Place of birth: Kaisariani, Greece
- Date of death: 20 July 2002 (aged 56)
- Place of death: Andros, Greece
- Position: Striker

Youth career
- 1962–1965: Kaisariani

Senior career*
Years	Team	Apps	(Gls)
1965–1966	Panegialios	30	(11)
1966–1973	Ethnikos Piraeus	185	(79)
1973–1980	Olympiacos	187	(83)
1980–1981	Apollon Athens	26	(4)
1984–1985	Panegialios		
Total		428	(177)

International career
1969–1977	Greece	28	(3)

Managerial career
- 1984–1985: Panegialios
- * Club domestic league appearances and goals

Michalis Kritikopoulos (Greek: Μιχάλης Κρητικόπουλος; 3 January 1946 – 20 July 2002) was a Greek professional footballer who played as a striker.

== Career ==
Born in Kaisariani, Kritikopoulos began playing football as a striker for local side G.S. Kaisariani in 1962. In 1964, he joined Ethnikos Piraeus, where he would play for nine seasons.

In 1973, Kritikopoulos joined Olympiacos where he played until 1980, winning three Alpha Ethniki and one Greek Football Cup titles. He finished his career with Apollon Athens F.C., retiring in 1981 at age 35. All told, Kritikopoulos scored 175 league goals making him one of the league's all-time leading goal-scorers.

Kritikopoulos made 28 appearances and scored three goals for the Greece national team from 1969 to 1977. He made his debut in a friendly against Australia on 19 July 1969.

== Personal life ==
In 2002, Kritikopoulos died from a cardiac arrest whilst playing in a friendly match for Olympiacos' veterans in Andros. Ethnikos Asteras has since named its football stadium after Kritikopoulos.

== Honours ==
Olympiacos

- Alpha Ethniki: 1973–74, 1974–75, 1979–80
- Greek Cup: 1974–75
- Greek Super Cup: 1980
