= Angelos Anastasiadis =

Greek footballer and manager

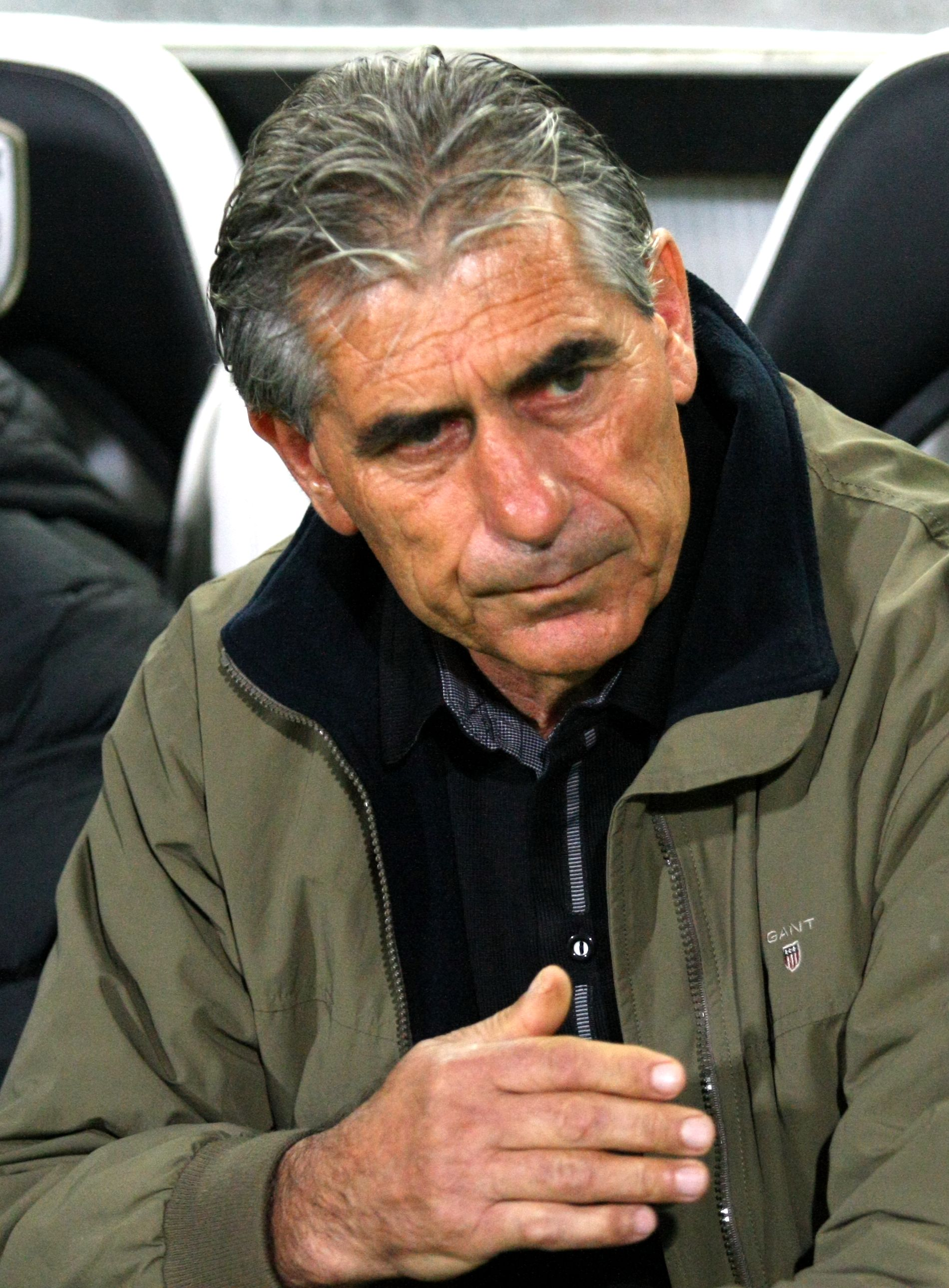

Personal information
- Date of birth: 8 March 1953 (age 73)
- Place of birth: Neoi Epivates, Thessaloniki, Greece
- Height: 1.77 m (5 ft 10 in)
- Position: Midfielder

Senior career*
Years	Team	Apps	(Gls)
1973–1981	PAOK	176	(25)
1981–1984	Panathinaikos	34	(5)
1984–1986	Korinthos		
1986–1987	Diagoras	13	(0)

International career
1975–1980	Greece	12	(1)

Managerial career
- 1994: Kavala
- 1995–1997: Edessaikos
- 1997–1998: PAOK
- 1998–1999: PAOK
- 1999–2000: Iraklis
- 2000–2001: Panathinaikos
- 2001–2002: Iraklis
- 2002–2004: PAOK
- 2004–2011: Cyprus
- 2011–2012: PAS Giannina
- 2012–2013: Platanias
- 2014: Platanias
- 2014–2015: PAOK
- 2016: AEL
- 2018–2019: Greece
- * Club domestic league appearances and goals

Angelos Anastasiadis (Greek: Άγγελος Αναστασιάδης; born 8 March 1953) is a Greek football manager and former international footballer. He previously coached numerous clubs in Greece including PAOK, Panathinaikos, Platanias and PAS Giannina as well as the Greece and Cyprus national teams.

== Playing career ==
=== Club ===
Anastasiadis began his playing career in his hometown with PAOK. After eight years at the Thessalonian club, he moved to Athens to play for Panathinaikos in 1981. In 1984, he transferred to Korinthos before finishing his playing career at Diagoras F.C. in 1987.

=== International ===
Between 1975 and 1980, Anastasiadis earned 12 caps for the Greece national team.

== Coaching career ==
=== Early management ===
Anastasiadis began his managerial career in July 1994 at Kavala F.C. but left after three months following a seven-game run that included one draw and six losses. In 1995, he was appointed as manager of Edessaikos F.C., leading the club to a ninth-place finish in the 1995–96 Alpha Ethniki. After a poor run midway through the 1996–97 season that included two wins and four draws in 14 matches, Anastasiadis left the club in January 1997.

=== PAOK and Iraklis ===
Within a month of leaving Edessaikos, Anastasiadis took over PAOK for the remainder of the 1996–97 season, leading the club to a fourth-place finish in the league with 13 victories in 15 matches, along with a spot in the second qualification round for the 1997–98 UEFA Cup. Under his leadership the following season, PAOK finished in fourth place in the 1997–98 Alpha Ethniki while overcoming Arsenal F.C. before losing to Atlético Madrid in the first two rounds of the UEFA Cup. After being briefly succeeded by Oleg Blokhin for the 1998–99 Alpha Ethniki season, Anastasiadis returned to PAOK in September 1999 before leaving the following February. During his second tenure, he managed 10 victories and one draw in 13 matches.

Anastasiadis moved to Iraklis in 1999 leading the club to a sixth-place finish and an opportunity to qualify for the 2000–01 UEFA Cup. Iraklis qualified for the first round of the UEFA Cup, overcoming Aris and Panionios in the league playoffs.

=== Panathinaikos ===
Following his success at Iraklis, the Thessaloniki native moved to Athens to manage Panathinaikos in 2000. Managing in his first UEFA Champions League, the club finished second after facing Deportivo La Coruña, Hamburger SV, and Juventus in the first group stage. In the second group stage, Panathinaikos lost the first two matches to Sturm Graz, prompting Anastasiadis to resign in February 2001.

=== Return to Thessaloniki ===
The next month, Anastasiadis returned to his home town to lead Iraklis for a second time but managed two wins and a draw in the last ten matches of the 2000–01 Alpha Ethniki season to a fifth-place finish. He stayed on for the following season and the club finished in sixth place in the league, earning a place in the 2001–02 UEFA Cup qualification round.

Anastasiadis returned to PAOK a month after leaving Iraklis in May 2002. The club finished the 2002–03 Alpha Ethniki season in fourth place, earning a spot in the 2003–04 UEFA Cup. The same season, Anastasiadis led PAOK to the Greek Cup, overcoming league champions Olympiacos and cup holders AEK, before defeating Aris in the final.

After failing to qualify for the 2004–05 UEFA Champions League and facing elimination from the 2004–05 UEFA Cup, PAOK announced their decision to sack Anastasiadis in September 2004.

=== Cyprus ===
Three months later, Anastasiadis ventured into international management, replacing Momčilo Vukotić as Cyprus national team manager, in December 2004. Taking over midway through the 2006 FIFA World Cup qualification campaign, the Greek coach managed just one victory, a 3–0 win over the Faroe Islands, in the last five qualification matches, finishing in fifth place and failing to qualify from a group that also included France, Switzerland, Israel, and the Republic of Ireland.

During the UEFA Euro 2008 qualifiers, Anastasiadis led the team to a 5–2 victory over the Republic of Ireland, a 2–1 victory over Hungary, a 3–1 victory over Wales, and a 1–1 draw with Germany before finishing sixth in Group D, which also included the Czech Republic and Slovakia. Despite failing to qualify for the tournament, the Cyprus Football Association renewed the Greek's contract in November 2007.

Cyprus did not qualify for the 2010 FIFA World Cup in South Africa but Anastasiadis led the team to a fourth-place finish that included a 4–1 victory over Bulgaria.

In his fourth international campaign, Anastasiadis led the island nation in their quest to UEFA Euro 2012. After a 4–4 draw with Portugal, the side only managed two points in their first four qualification matches, leading to Anastasiadis's dismissal from the post.

=== Return to club management ===
Following his experience in Cyprus, Anastasiadis returned to club management in November 2011 to lead PAS Giannina in the Greek Super League. The club finished in eighth place with ten wins and eight draws out of 30 matches, including a 2–1 away victory over PAOK.

Moving to Crete, Anastasiadis succeeded Giannis Chatzinikolaou at Platanias F.C. Despite managing to defeat Panathinaikos both times during the league season as well as in the Greek Cup, the club finished in ninth place. Though initially leaving in May 2013, Anastasiadis return to the club to oversee the final ten matches of the 2013–14 season, leading the club to finish in 14th place, saving the club from relegation.

Anastasiadis returned to PAOK for the third time in May 2014. Despite a successful start to the season, the club gradually relinquished its first-place position in the league and was eliminated in the group stage of the 2014–15 UEFA Europa League. The club dismissed Anastasiadis in March 2015 after managing just one victory in his last seven matches.

In June 2016, A.E. Larissa president Alexis Kougias announced Anastasiadis as the club's new manager, replacing Sakis Tsiolis. The appointment generated controversy as fans expressed their unhappiness due to Anastasiadis's past association with PAOK FC.

=== Greece national team ===
After being out of management for two years, Hellenic Football Federation president Vangelis Grammenos appointed Anastassiadis, in October 2018, to lead the Greece national team, becoming the first Greek manager to hold the post on a permanent basis since Vassilis Daniil in 2001. With the team gaining six points in four matches in the UEFA Nations League and sitting behind first placed Finland, Grammenos added that the federation took a conscious decision to hire a Greek coach "to instill the characteristics required in a national squad."

With the objective to earn promotion in the 2018–19 UEFA Nations League, Anastasiadis introduced several new players into the squad including Odisseas Vlachodimos, Spyros Risvanis, Manolis Siopis, and Georgios Masouras. Greece resumed the campaign in November 2018 with a 1–0 victory over Finland but failed to earn a promotion after a 1–0 defeat to Estonia following an own goal from Vassilis Lambropoulos.

Greece faced Italy, Bosnia and Herzegovina, Finland, Armenia, and Liechtenstein for the UEFA Euro 2020 qualifiers. In March 2019, Anastasiadis opened the campaign with a 2–0 victory over Liechtenstein before a 2–2 draw with Bosnia and Herzegovina witnessed the team level the score after falling behind by two goals.

Anastasiadis's position came under question following 3–0 and 3–2 defeats to Italy and Armenia respectively, resulting in a public conflict with team captain Sokratis Papastathopoulos. On 15 July 2019, Grammenos announced the dismissal of Anastasiadis as manager.

== Managerial statistics ==
As of match played 11 June 2019

Team	From	To	Record				
Team	From	To	G	W	D	L	Win %
Kavala	July 1994	October 1994	10	3	1	6	33.33
Edessaikos	July 1995	January 1997	53	15	13	25	28.30
PAOK	February 1997	June 1998	63	41	11	11	65.10
PAOK	September 1998	February 1999	19	13	3	3	68.42
Iraklis	July 1999	June 2000	42	19	8	15	45.24
Panathinaikos	July 2000	February 2001	44	25	10	9	56.82
Iraklis	March 2001	May 2002	47	18	11	18	38.30
PAOK	August 2002	September 2004	94	48	24	23	51.06
Cyprus	December 2004	April 2011	56	17	10	29	30.36
PAS Giannina	December 2011	June 2012	22	9	4	9	40.91
Platanias	November 2012	May 2013	35	15	4	16	42.85
Platanias	February 2014	June 2014	10	5	1	4	50.00
PAOK	July 2014	March 2015	38	19	6	13	50.00
AEL	June 2016	October 2016	8	2	2	4	25.00
Greece	November 2018	July 2019	7	2	1	4	28.57
Total			548	251	108	189	45.80

== Honours ==
=== As a player ===
PAOK

- Greek Championship: 1976
- Greek Cup: 1974

Panathinaikos

- Greek Championship: 1984
- Greek Cup: 1982, 1984

=== As a manager ===
PAOK

- Greek Cup: 2003
