= Anthi Karagianni Stadium =

Multi-purpose stadium in Kavala, Greece

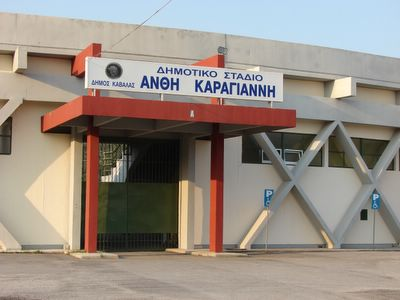
- Interactive map of Anthi Karagianni Stadium
- Location: Kavala, Greece
- Coordinates: 40°56′49″N 24°26′10″E
- Owner: Municipality of Kavala
- Operator: Kavala F.C.
- Capacity: 10,550
- Surface: Grass
- Scoreboard: No

Construction
- Groundbreaking: 1970
- Built: 1970

Tenant
- Kavala F.C. (1970–present)

The Anthi Karagianni Municipal Stadium (Greek: Δημοτικό Στάδιο Ανθή Καραγιάννη), formerly the Kavala National Stadium, is a multi-purpose stadium in Kavala, Greece. It is the homebase of Kavala F.C.

== History ==
The stadium was built 1970, and currently has a seating capacity of 10,550. It is named after the paralympic athlete, Anthi Karagianni, who won three silver medals in the 2004 Paralympic Games.

== Gallery ==
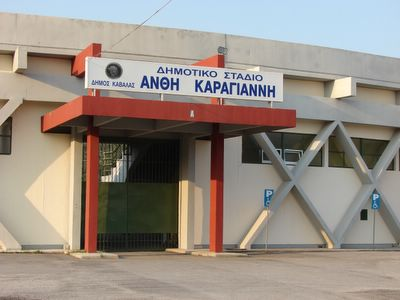
Main entrance
