= List of PAOK FC seasons =

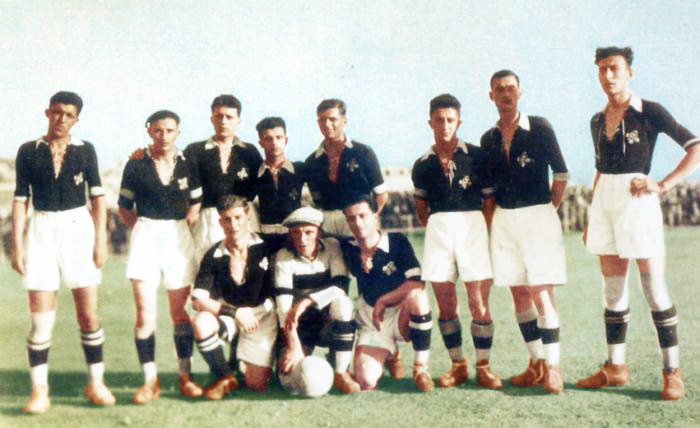
PAOK in 1926 Standing (left to right): Andreadis, Makaronopoulos, Vlachou, Pantermalis, Pagalos, Tsolakidis, Lianopoulos, Georgiadis Seated: Christidis, Papadopoulos, Ventourelis

PAOK FC is a football club based in Thessaloniki, that competes in Super League, the most senior football league in Greece. The club was formed on 20 April 1926 by Greek refugees from Constantinople, and played their first official encounter on 12 December 1926, prevailing 3–1 over Nea Genea Kalamaria. Initially PAOK played against other local clubs in the Macedonia FCA (EPSM). In 1927–28, PAOK took part in the Macedonia FCA 1st Division for the first time. In 1930–31 they qualified for their maiden participation in the Panhellenic Championship. From 1930 to 1959 PAOK played in the Macedonia FCA 1st Division and qualified many times for the final phase of the Panhellenic Championship. PAOK currently plays in the top-flight Super League, which they have won four times (in 1976, 1985, 2019 and 2024). They are eight-time winners of the Greek Cup (in 1972, 1974, 2001, 2003, 2017, 2018, 2019 and 2021). The club is one of the three which have never been relegated from the top national division and the only team in Greece that have won the Double (in 2019) going unbeaten (26–4–0 record) in a national round-robin league tournament (league format since 1959).

== Key ==
Key to league:

- Pos. = Final position
- Pl. = Played
- W = Games won
- D = Games drawn
- L = Games lost
- GF = Goals scored
- GA = Goals against
- Pts = Points

Key to rounds:

- W = Winners
- F = Final (Runner-up)
- SF = Semi-finals
- QF = Quarter-finals
- R16/R32 = Round of 16, round of 32, etc.
- PO = Play-off round
- FR = Fourth Round
- 3rTh = 3rd round thessaloniki's
- GS = Group stage
- AR = Additional Round

Champions	Runners-up

== Seasons ==
In 1927, a national championship was organised in the form of a round-robin tournament between the champions of the three governing bodies, Macedonia FCA (EPSM)- Athens FCA (EPSA)- and Piraeus FCA (EPSP). This national championship was set up again in 1929, and over the next years evolved into a tournament in which multiple teams took part. In 1959 the Alpha Ethniki - the precursor of the current Super League - was set up as a national round-robin tournament. At present, 16 clubs compete in the Super League, playing each other in a home and away series. The second through fifth place teams in the Super League enter a play-off for the second Greek entry. In the play-off, the teams play each other in a home and away round robin. However, they do not all start with 0 points. Instead, a weighting system applies to the teams' standing at the start of the play-off mini-league. The team finishing fifth in the Super League will start the play off with 0 points. The fifth place team’s end of season tally of points is used to calculate the sum of the points that other teams will have. The point difference of each of the 2nd, 3rd and 4th team from the fifth place team is then divided by five (if the result is a decimal number it is then rounded to a full number, with .5 or more being rounded up) and the resulting number respectively for each team is the number of points with which they will start the mini-league. On 18 August 2017, Super League decided that they will not be held play-offs for 2017-2018.

Season	League									Greek Cup	Europe		Other competitions		Season Top scorer	
Season	Division	Pos.	Pl.	W	D	L	GF	GA	Pts	Greek Cup	Europe		Other competitions		Name(s)	Goals
1926–27	Macedonia 2nd	1st	8	7	0	1	—	—	—	Not Held						
1926–27	Play off matches^{[a]}	—	4	4	0	0	9	2	—	Not Held						
1927–28	Macedonia FCA	2nd	—	—	—	—	28	10	15	Not Held						
1927–28	Pan. Cham	x	x	x	x	x	x	x	x	Not Held						
1928–29	Macedonia FCA	2nd	10	8	2	0	32	8	18	Not Held						
1928–29	Pan. Cham									Not Held						
1929–30	Macedonia FCA	3rd	10	6	0	4	23	18	12	Not Held					Ettiene	8
1929–30	Pan. Cham	x	x	x	x	x	x	x	x	Not Held					Ettiene	8
1930–31	Macedonia FCA	2nd	5	4	0	1	19	10	8	Not Held						
1930–31	Pan. Cham	5th	14	5	2	7	20	26	12	Not Held						
1931–32	Macedonia FCA	x	x	x	x	x	x	x	x	SF						
1931–32	Pan. Cham	7th	14	5	1	8	18	25	11	SF						
1932–33	North Group	x	x	x	x	x	x	x	x	R16						
1932–33	Pan. Cham	x	x	x	x	x	x	x	x	R16						
1933–34	North Group	3rd	6	2	3	1	19	10	7	Not Held						
1933–34	Pan. Cham	x	x	x	x	x	x	x	x	Not Held						
1934–35	North Group	3rd	6	3	1	2	10	8	7	Not Held						
1934–35	Pan. Cham									Not Held						
1935–36	Pan. Cham	7th	14	3	4	7	21	32	11	Not Held						
1936–37	Macedonia FCA	1st	8	6	0	2	19	11	12	Not Held						
1936–37	Pan. Cham	2nd	4	1	0	3	3	9	2	Not Held						
1937–38	Macedonia FCA	2nd	12	—	—	—	31	19	17	Not Held						
1937–38	Pan. Cham	x	x	x	x	x	x	x	x	Not Held						
1938–39	Macedonia FCA	3rd	10	—	—	—	28	13	23	F						
1938–39	North Group	3rd	—	—	—	—	22	14	20	F						
1938–39	Pan. Cham	x	x	x	x	x	x	x	x	F						
1939–40	Macedonia FCA	2nd	10	6	2	2	22	12	24	QF						
1939–40	North Group	1st	4	2	1	1	7	6	9	QF						
1939–40	Pan. Cham	2nd	2	0	0	2	3	5	—	QF						
1940–41	No competitive football was played between 1940 and 1945 due to the World War II															
1941–42	No competitive football was played between 1940 and 1945 due to the World War II															
1942–43	No competitive football was played between 1940 and 1945 due to the World War II															
1943–44	No competitive football was played between 1940 and 1945 due to the World War II															
1944–45	No competitive football was played between 1940 and 1945 due to the World War II															
1945–46	Macedonia FCA	3rd	10	—	—	—	—	—	21	Not Held						
1945–46	Pan. Cham	x	x	x	x	x	x	x	x	Not Held						
1946–47	Macedonia FCA	5th	10	—	—	—	16	13	18	R16						
1946–47	Pan. Cham	x	x	x	x	x	x	x	x	R16						
1947–48	Macedonia FCA	1st	10	—	—	—	25	10	28	3rTh						
1947–48	Pan. Cham	3rd	4	0	1	3	2	7	5	3rTh						
1948–49	Macedonia FCA	2nd	10	—	—	—	21	9	25	SF						
1948–49	Pan. Cham	x	x	x	x	x	x	x	x	SF						
1949–50	Macedonia FCA	1st	10	—	—	—	25	17	26	QF						
1949–50	Pan. Cham									QF						
1950–51	Macedonia FCA	3rd	10	—	—	—	18	14	22	F						
1950–51	Pan. Cham	x	x	x	x	x	x	x	x	F						
1951–52	Macedonia FCA	—	—	—	—	—	—	—	—	R16						
1951–52	Pan. Cham									R16						
1952–53	Macedonia FCA	4th	10	4	1	5	11	11	19	R32						
1953–54	Macedonia FCA	1st	10	9	1	0	30	10	29	R16					Kouiroukidis	22
1953–54	Pan. Cham	4th	10	2	3	5	15	14	17	R16					Kouiroukidis	22
1954–55	Macedonia FCA	1st	10	8	2	0	28	7	28	F						
1954–55	Pan. Cham	4th	10	5	0	5	21	13	20	F						
1955–56	Macedonia FCA	1st	10	9	1	0	31	6	29	R16						
1955–56	SF Pan. Cham	2nd	6	4	1	1	18	5	15	R16						
1955–56	FS Pan. Cham	4th	10	3	4	3	13	13	20	R16						
1956–57	Macedonia FCA	1st	10	6	2	2	10	8	24	R32						
1956–57	Pan. Cham	4th	18	9	1	8	28	25	37	R32						
1957–58	Macedonia FCA	3rd	10	5	2	3	16	8	22	R16						
1957–58	Pan. Cham	8th	22	5	10	7	32	38	42	R16						
1958–59	Macedonia FCA	2nd	10	5	3	2	14	8	23	QF						
1958–59	Pan. Cham	8th	18	5	4	9	14	34	32	QF						
In 1959 the Alpha Ethniki - the precursor of the current Super League - was set up as a national round-robin tournament.																
1959–60	Alpha Ethniki	7th	30	10	9	11	32	32	59	R32					Kiourtzis	19
1960–61	Alpha Ethniki	10th	30	7	15	8	31	33	59	R32					Vasiliadis	9
1961–62	Alpha Ethniki	6th	30	12	6	12	32	43	60	R16					Giakoumis	12
1962–63	Alpha Ethniki	4th	30	13	8	9	44	34	64	QF					Giakoumis	14
1963–64	Alpha Ethniki	8th	30	10	7	13	22	30	56	R16					Symeonidis	6
1964–65	Alpha Ethniki	8th	30	9	10	11	29	33	58	R16					Charalampidis	8
1965–66	Alpha Ethniki	6th	30	10	9	11	43	49	59	R32	Inter-Cities Fairs Cup	R32			Koudas	14
1966–67	Alpha Ethniki	4th	30	13	11	6	36	20	67	R64					Afentoulidis	12
1967–68	Alpha Ethniki	9th	34	13	7	14	45	40	67	QF	Inter-Cities Fairs Cup	R48			Afentoulidis	23
1968–69	Alpha Ethniki	5th	34	16	10	8	58	37	76	QF					Koudas	26
1969–70	Alpha Ethniki	5th	34	12	17	5	52	25	75	F					Sarafis	21
1970–71	Alpha Ethniki	8th	34	12	10	12	38	32	68	F	Inter-Cities Fairs Cup	R64			Aslanidis	13
1971–72	Alpha Ethniki	5th	34	18	10	6	53	27	80	W					Apostolidis	17
1972–73	Alpha Ethniki	2nd	34	27	4	3	75	24	92	F	Cup Winners' Cup	R32			Sarafis	25
1973–74	Alpha Ethniki	4th	34	16	11	7	62	32	43	W	Cup Winners' Cup	QF	Cup of Greater Greece	W	Aslanidis	21
1974–75	Alpha Ethniki	3rd	34	19	8	7	73	28	46	SF	Cup Winners' Cup	R32			Sarafis	15
1975–76	Alpha Ethniki	1st	30	21	7	2	60	17	49	R16	UEFA Cup	R64			Koudas / Anastasiadis	15
1976–77	Alpha Ethniki	3rd	34	21	10	3	63	27	52	F	European Cup	R16			Guerino	18
1977–78	Alpha Ethniki	2nd	34	16	14	4	48	24	46	F	Cup Winners' Cup	R16			Orfanos	21
1978–79	Alpha Ethniki	4th	34	18	9	7	73	23	45	R16	Cup Winners' Cup	R32			Guerino	16
1979–80	Alpha Ethniki	5th	34	17	7	10	53	33	41	SF					Kostikos	18
1980–81	Alpha Ethniki	4th	34	15	12	7	52	31	42	F					Kermanidis	12
1981–82	Alpha Ethniki	3rd	34	18	10	6	55	22	46	SF	Cup Winners' Cup	R32			Kostikos	23
1982–83	Alpha Ethniki	4th	34	18	6	10	49	28	42	F	UEFA Cup	R32			Dimopoulos	16
1983–84	Alpha Ethniki	5th	30	11	13	6	33	29	35	QF	UEFA Cup	R32			Dimopoulos	11
1984–85	Alpha Ethniki	1st	30	19	8	3	54	26	46	F					Dimopoulos	17
1985–86	Alpha Ethniki	10th	30	10	7	13	33	38	27	AR	European Cup	R32			Skartados	12
1986–87	Alpha Ethniki	5th	30	13	9	8	39	23	29	R32					Skartados	8
1987–88	Alpha Ethniki	3rd	30	17	5	8	60	27	39	R32					Bannon / Borbokis	9
1988–89	Alpha Ethniki	8th	30	11	10	9	34	30	32	QF	UEFA Cup	FR			Skartados	12
1989–90	Alpha Ethniki	3rd	34	19	8	7	49	26	46	R16			Greek League Cup	FR	Skartados	17
1990–91	Alpha Ethniki	4th	34	16	9	9	56	39	38	SF	UEFA Cup	FR			Skartados	17
1991–92	Alpha Ethniki	4th	34	13	13	8	44	44	39	F	UEFA Cup	R32			Skartados	18
1992–93	Alpha Ethniki	5th	34	17	6	11	52	38	57	R32	UEFA Cup	FR			Đurđević	13
1993–94	Alpha Ethniki	5th	34	14	9	11	45	38	51	R16					Luhový	18
1994–95	Alpha Ethniki	3rd	34	20	5	9	55	29	65	R32					Zouboulis	10
1995–96	Alpha Ethniki	14th	34	10	11	13	42	46	38	SF					Zouboulis	18
1996–97	Alpha Ethniki	4th	34	19	9	6	53	28	66	R16					Frantzeskos	16
1997–98	Alpha Ethniki	4th	34	21	7	6	74	41	70	SF	UEFA Cup	R32			Frantzeskos	22
1998–99	Alpha Ethniki	4th	34	19	5	10	52	31	62	R16	UEFA Cup	2QR			Frantzeskos / Kafes	8
1999–00	Alpha Ethniki	5th	34	15	10	9	64	44	55	R16	UEFA Cup	SR			Frousos	18
2000–01	Alpha Ethniki	4th	30	14	9	7	66	48	51	W	UEFA Cup	R32			Nalitzis	19
2001–02	Alpha Ethniki	4th	26	14	6	6	55	45	48	QF	UEFA Cup	R32			Georgiadis	17
2002–03	Alpha Ethniki	4th	30	16	5	9	59	38	53	W	UEFA Cup	R32			Georgiadis	18
2003–04	Alpha Ethniki	3rd	30	18	6	6	47	27	60	R16	UEFA Cup	SR			Salpingidis	18
2004–05	Alpha Ethniki	5th	30	13	7	10	43	39	46	R32	Champions League	3Q			Salpingidis	16
2004–05	Alpha Ethniki	5th	30	13	7	10	43	39	46	R32	UEFA Cup	FR			Salpingidis	16
2005–06	Alpha Ethniki	6th	30	13	7	10	44	31	46	R32	UEFA Cup	GS			Salpingidis	20
In 2006 Super League Greece was formed and replaced Alpha Ethniki as the top tier of the Greek football league system.																
2006–07	Super League	6th	30	13	6	11	32	29	45	QF					Mięciel	15
2007–08	Super League	9th	30	10	5	15	29	35	35	R32					Salmon	5
2008–09	Super League	2nd	30	18	9	3	39	16	63	QF					Bakayoko	10
2008–09	play-offs	4th	6	2	0	4	5	9	9	QF					Bakayoko	10
2009–10	Super League	3rd	30	19	5	6	41	16	62	QF	Europa League	PO			Ivić	10
2009–10	play-offs	2nd	6	4	1	1	7	3	16	QF	Europa League	PO			Ivić	10
2010–11	Super League	4th	30	14	6	10	32	29	48	SF	Champions League	3Q			Salpingidis	12
2010–11	play-offs	3rd	6	4	0	2	11	8	12	SF	Europa League	R32			Salpingidis	12
2011–12	Super League	3rd	30	14	8	8	45	27	50	QF	Europa League	R32			Athanasiadis	17
2011–12	play-offs	5th	6	2	1	3	3	6	7	QF	Europa League	R32			Athanasiadis	17
2012–13	Super League	2nd	30	18	8	4	46	19	62	SF	Europa League	PO			Athanasiadis	23
2012–13	play-offs	2nd	6	3	0	3	7	7	13	SF	Europa League	PO			Athanasiadis	23
2013–14	Super League	2nd	34	21	6	7	68	37	69	F	Champions League	PO			Athanasiadis	17
2013–14	play-offs	3rd	6	3	2	1	8	4	10	F	Europa League	R32			Athanasiadis	17
2014–15	Super League	3rd	34	20	5	9	57	42	65	R32	Europa League	GS			Athanasiadis	18
2014–15	play-offs	5th	6	0	2	4	1	6	4	R32	Europa League	GS			Athanasiadis	18
2015–16	Super League	4th	30	13	9	8	45	32	45	SF	Europa League	GS			Mak	20
2015–16	play-offs	2nd	6	3	3	0	8	3	12	SF	Europa League	GS			Mak	20
2016–17	Super League	2nd	30	20	4	6	52	19	61	W	Champions League	3Q			Prijović	10
2016–17	play-offs	4th	6	3	0	3	7	5	5	W	Europa League	R32			Prijović	10
2017–18	Super League	2nd	30	21	4	5	59	19	64	W	Europa League	PO			Prijović	27
2018–19	Super League	1st	30	26	4	0	66	14	80	W	Champions League	PO			Prijović	18
2018–19	Super League	1st	30	26	4	0	66	14	80	W	Europa League	GS			Prijović	18
2019–20	Super League	2nd	36	21	10	5	56	27	73	SF	Champions League	3Q			Świderski	14
2019–20	Super League	2nd	36	21	10	5	56	27	73	SF	Europa League	PO			Świderski	14
2020–21	Super League	2nd	36	18	10	8	60	34	64	W	Champions League	PO			Tzolis	16
2020–21	Super League	2nd	36	18	10	8	60	34	64	W	Europa League	GS			Tzolis	16
2021–22	Super League	2nd	36	19	7	10	58	33	64	F	Conference League	QF			Kurtić	18
2022–23	Super League	4th	36	19	10	7	57	32	67	F	Conference League	2Q			Brandon	12
2023–24	Super League	1st	36	25	5	6	87	34	80	SF	Conference League	QF			A. Živković	19
2024–25	Super League	3rd	32	18	4	10	62	37	58	QF	Champions League	3Q			A. Živković	12
2024–25	Super League	3rd	32	18	4	10	62	37	58	QF	Europa League	KPO			A. Živković	12
2025–26	Super League	3rd	32	18	10	4	59	25	64	F	Europa League	KPO			Giakoumakis	15

As of 4 June 2026

== Notes ==
A. The Panhellenic Championship not held on 1928-29, 1934–35, 1949–50, and 1951-52.

B. — , (n/a) = Stats missing.

C. x = PAOK did not participate.
