= 1991–92 PAOK FC season =

PAOK
1991–92 season
- President: Thomas Voulinos
- Manager: Miroslav Blažević; Ioannis Gounaris
- Stadium: Toumba Stadium
- Alpha Ethniki: 4th
- Greek Cup: Runners-up
- UEFA Cup: 2nd round
- Top goalscorer: League: Georgios Skartados (9); All: Georgios Skartados (18)
- Highest home attendance: 25,744 vs Olympiacos

The 1991–92 season was PAOK Football Club's 65th in existence and the club's 33rd consecutive season in the top flight of Greek football. The team entered the Greek Football Cup in first round and reached the 2nd round of the UEFA Cup.

== Players ==
=== Squad ===
Note: Flags indicate national team as defined under FIFA eligibility rules; some limited exceptions apply. Players may hold more than one non-FIFA nationality.

No.	Pos.	Nation	Player
—	GK	CRO	Tonči Gabrić
—	GK	GRE	Giannis Gitsioudis
—	GK	GRE	Apostolos Terzis
—	DF	GRE	Alexis Alexiou
—	DF	GRE	Georgios Mitsibonas
—	DF	GRE	Kostas Malioufas
—	DF	GRE	Dimitris Mitoglou
—	DF	GRE	Michalis Leontiadis
—	DF	GRE	Dimitris Palaskas
—	MF	GRE	Georgios Skartados (captain)
—	MF	GRE	Kostas Lagonidis
—	MF	EGY	Magdy Tolba

No.	Pos.	Nation	Player
—	MF	GRE	Giannis Alexoulis
—	MF	GRE	Giorgos Toursounidis
—	MF	GRE	Kostas Oikonomidis
—	MF	GRE	Christos Chionas
—	MF	GRE	Nikos Plitsis
—	MF	GRE	Michalis Stergiou
—	FW	YUG	Milan Đurđević
—	FW	AUS	John Anastasiadis
—	FW	GRE	Stefanos Borbokis
—	FW	GRE	Athanasios Basbanas
—	FW	GRE	Vangelis Kalogeropoulos
—	FW	GRE	Vangelis Mylonas
—	FW	BEL	Dimitri Mbuyu

== Transfers ==
Players transferred in

Transfer Window	Pos.	Name	Club	Fee
Summer	GK	(Croatia) Tonči Gabrić	(Croatia) HNK Rijeka	Free
Summer	MF	(Greece) Kostas Oikonomidis	(Greece) Aris	?
Summer	FW	(Federal Republic of Yugoslavia) Milan Đurđević	(Federal Republic of Yugoslavia) Partizan	Free
Summer	FW	(Belgium) Dimitri Mbuyu	(Belgium) Royal Antwerp	Loan
Winter	MF	(Greece) Christos Chionas	(Greece) Doxa Drama	?
Winter	FW	(Greece) Vangelis Kalogeropoulos	(Greece) AEL	?

Players transferred out

Transfer Window	Pos.	Name	Club	Fee
Summer	DF	(Greece) Giannis Antonopoulos		Retired
Summer	DF	(Greece) Nikos Karageorgiou	(Greece) Panathinaikos	?
Summer	DF	(Egypt) Ibrahim Hassan	(Switzerland) Neuchâtel Xamax	Free
Summer	FW	(Egypt) Hossam Hassan	(Switzerland) Neuchâtel Xamax	Free
Winter	MF	(Greece) Giannis Alexoulis	(Greece) AEL	Free

== Pre-season ==
Win Draw Loss

26 July 1991 Friendly	TSV Fulpmes	1–5	PAOK	Austria
			Basbanas; Borbokis; Anastasiadis

29 July 1991 Friendly	FC Kufstein	0–9	PAOK	Austria
			Lagonidis; Skartados; Anastasiadis; Đurđević; Mylonas; Oikonomidis

5 August 1991 Friendly	PAOK	1–1	Melbourne Hellas	Thessaloniki
	Skartados 16'		Michalakopoulos 87'	Stadium: Toumba Stadium

7 August 1991 Friendly	AEK Athens	2–1	PAOK	Athens
	Manolas 61'; Karagiozopoulos (penalty missed) 72'; Antonopoulos 78' (o.g.)		Skartados 19' (pen.)	Stadium: Nikos Goumas Stadium; Referee: Iatropoulos

15 August 1991 Friendly	Xanthi	4–1	PAOK	Xanthi
	Marcelo 21'; Sandro 31'; Carlau 37'; Marinakis 39'		Skartados 45' (pen.)	Stadium: Xanthi Ground; Referee: Koutoulidis

== Competitions ==
=== Overview ===
Competition	Record							
Competition	Pld	W	D	L	GF	GA	GD	Win %
Alpha Ethniki	34	13	13	8	44	44	+0	38.24
Greek Cup	14	7	3	4	28	14	+14	50.00
UEFA Cup	4	1	1	2	2	5	−3	25.00
Total	52	21	17	14	74	63	+11	40.38

Source: Competitions

=== Managerial statistics ===
Head coach	From	To	Record							
Head coach	From	To	G	W	D	L	GF	GA	GD	Win %
(Croatia) Miroslav Blažević	Start of season	22.03.1992	38	17	13	8	56	44	+12	44.74
(Greece) Ioannis Gounaris	29.03.1992	End of season	14	4	4	6	18	19	−1	28.57

== Alpha Ethniki ==
=== Standings ===
Pos	Team	Pld	W	D	L	GF	GA	GD	Pts	Qualification or relegation
2	Olympiacos	34	20	11	3	74	30	+44	51	Qualification for Cup Winners' Cup first round
3	Panathinaikos	34	21	6	7	66	21	+45	48	Qualification for UEFA Cup first round
4	PAOK	34	13	13	8	44	44	0	39	Qualification for UEFA Cup first round
5	Apollon Athens	34	14	7	13	35	34	+1	35	
6	OFI	34	11	12	11	34	30	+4	34	

Source: RSSSF
Rules for classification: 1st points; 2nd head-to-head points; 3rd head-to-head goal difference; 4th decision match.

==== Results summary ====
Overall								Home						Away					
Pld	W	D	L	GF	GA	GD	Pts	W	D	L	GF	GA	GD	W	D	L	GF	GA	GD
34	13	13	8	44	44	0	52	12	2	3	26	17	+9	1	11	5	18	27	−9

Last updated: 7 June 1992.
Source: Competitive matches

==== Results by round ====
Round	1	2	3	4	5	6	7	8	9	10	11	12	13	14	15	16	17	18	19	20	21	22	23	24	25	26	27	28	29	30	31	32	33	34
Ground	H	A	H	A	A	H	A	H	A	H	H	A	H	H	A	H	A	A	H	A	H	H	A	H	A	H	A	A	H	A	A	H	A	H
Result	D	D	W	W	D	L	D	W	D	W	W	D	W	W	L	W	L	D	L	D	W	W	D	W	D	W	D	L	W	L	D	L	L	D
Position	10	10	4	3	5	7	7	8	7	6	5	5	5	5	5	4	5	4	5	5	5	5	4	4	4	4	4	4	4	4	4	4	4	4

Source: League matches
A = Away; H = Home; W = Win; D = Draw; L = Loss

==== Matches ====
Win Draw Loss

1 September 1991 1	PAOK	1–1	Aris	Thessaloniki
	Alexiou 67'		Gioukoudis 64'	Stadium: Toumba Stadium; Attendance: 23,025; Referee: Charlavanis

8 September 1991 2	Ethnikos Piraeus	1–1	PAOK	Piraeus
	Kalaydzhief 9'		Skartados 64' (pen.)	Stadium: Karaiskakis Stadium; Attendance: 6,102; Referee: Sarafoudis

15 September 1991 3	PAOK	2–1	Athinaikos	Thessaloniki
	Borbokis 27'; Lagonidis 90'		Ch.Dimopoulos 2'	Stadium: Toumba Stadium; Attendance: 7,010; Referee: Rigas

22 September 1991 4	Pierikos	1–2	PAOK	Katerini
	Randjelović 83'		Alexiou 43'; Borbokis 70'	Stadium: Katerini Stadium; Attendance: 7,367; Referee: Kougios

29 September 1991 5	AEL	0–0	PAOK	Larissa
				Stadium: Alcazar Stadium; Attendance: 9,624

13 October 1991 6	PAOK	0–3	Iraklis	Thessaloniki
			Th.Dimopoulos 23'; Iliadis 55'; Toutziaris 61'	Stadium: Toumba Stadium; Attendance: 14,332

20 October 1991 7	Panachaiki	3–3	PAOK	Patras
	Pană 2'; Pias 10'; Drakopoulos 50'		Skartados 21' (pen.), 80' (pen.); Lagonidis 30'	Stadium: Kostas Davourlis Stadium; Attendance: 3,901; Referee: Arnakis

3 November 1991 8	PAOK	1–0	OFI	Thessaloniki
	Alexiou 50'			Stadium: Toumba Stadium; Attendance: 5,157; Referee: Sarafoudis

10 November 1991 9	Panionios	1–1	PAOK	Athens
	Tsakogiorgas 37'		Malioufas (red card) 41'; Skartados 57'	Stadium: Nea Smyrni Stadium; Attendance: 3,521; Referee: Xythalis

24 November 1991 10	PAOK	3–2	Doxa Drama	Thessaloniki
	Alexiou 20'; Oikonomidis 27'; Skartados 78'		Mouratidis 33'; Georgiadis 87'	Stadium: Toumba Stadium; Attendance: 5,260

8 December 1991 11	PAOK	2–1	Xanthi	Thessaloniki
	Alexiou 37'; Malioufas 41'		Ouzounidis 76' (pen.)	Stadium: Toumba Stadium; Attendance: 1,437

23 December 1991 12	Panserraikos	0–0	PAOK	Serres
				Stadium: Serres Municipal Stadium; Attendance: 5,663; Referee: Naziris

29 December 1991 13	PAOK	2–1	Apollon Athens	Thessaloniki
	Đurđević 33'; Skartados 73'		Katzenbach 67'	Stadium: Toumba Stadium; Attendance: 7,177; Referee: Adamopoulos

5 January 1992 14	PAOK	2–1	Korinthos	Thessaloniki
	Đurđević 76'; Alexiou 83'		Karastamatis 51'	Stadium: Toumba Stadium; Attendance: 6,933

12 January 1992 15	Olympiacos	3–2	PAOK	Piraeus
	Tsalouchidis 18'; Savichev 30'; Protasov 82'		Anastasiadis 11'; Lagonidis 90'	Stadium: Karaiskakis Stadium; Attendance: 18,004; Referee: Naziris

19 January 1992 16	PAOK	1–0	Panathinaikos	Thessaloniki
	Chionas 20'			Stadium: Toumba Stadium; Attendance: 21,838; Referee: Plevritis

25 January 1992 17	AEK Athens	3–1	PAOK	Athens
	Dimitriadis 28' (penalty missed) 70'; Savvidis 73'; Klopas 81'		Đurđević 86'	Stadium: Nikos Goumas Stadium; Attendance: 9,562; Referee: Koukoulas

2 February 1992 18	Aris	1–1	PAOK	Thessaloniki
	Gekas 5'; Kolomitrousis (red card) 54'		Đurđević 38'	Stadium: Kleanthis Vikelidis Stadium; Attendance: 14,139; Referee: Bikas

9 February 1992 19	PAOK	0–1	Ethnikos Piraeus	Thessaloniki
			Bozdanski (penalty missed) 6'; Kamitsis 67'	Stadium: Toumba Stadium; Attendance: 3,497; Referee: Katsikogiannis

16 February 1992 20	Athinaikos	1–1	PAOK	Athens
	Kolev 54' (pen.)		Skartados 59' (pen.)	Stadium: Vyronas National Stadium; Referee: Xythalis

23 February 1992 21	PAOK	2–1	Pierikos	Thessaloniki
	Toursounidis 69'; Borbokis 86'		Randjelović 56'	Stadium: Toumba Stadium; Attendance: 4,285

1 March 1992 22	PAOK	2–1	AEL	Thessaloniki
	Đurđević 27'; Leontiadis 81'		Petkov 7'	Stadium: Toumba Stadium; Attendance: 4,995; Referee: Kougios

8 March 1992 23	Iraklis	2–2	PAOK	Thessaloniki
	Toutziaris 32'; Papadopoulos 75'		Toursounidis 22'; Leontiadis 50'	Stadium: Kaftanzoglio Stadium; Attendance: 5,100; Referee: Koukoulas

15 March 1992 24	PAOK	1–0	Panachaiki	Thessaloniki
	Tolba 75' (pen.)			Stadium: Toumba Stadium; Referee: Charlavanis

22 March 1992 25	OFI	1–1	PAOK	Heraklion
	Patemtzis 48'; Delgado (red card) 56'		Anastasiadis 53' (red card) 56'; Leontiadis (red card) 56'	Stadium: Theodoros Vardinogiannis Stadium; Attendance: 6,920

29 March 1992 26	PAOK	1–0	Panionios	Thessaloniki
	Tolba 8'			Stadium: Toumba Stadium; Attendance: 4,555

11 April 1992 27	Doxa Drama	0–0	PAOK	Drama
				Stadium: Doxa Drama Stadium; Attendance: 348

19 April 1992 28	Xanthi	2–1	PAOK	Xanthi
	Tzatzos 33'; Malousis 90+2'		Skartados 89'	Stadium: Xanthi Ground; Attendance: 3,131; Referee: Katsikogiannis

3 May 1992 29	PAOK	3–0	Panserraikos	Thessaloniki
	Lagonidis 19'; Đurđević 53'; Toursounidis 71'			Stadium: Toumba Stadium; Attendance: 3,104; Referee: Mazarakis

9 May 1992 30	Apollon Athens	2–0	PAOK	Athens
	Katzenbach (penalty missed) 20'; Roussos 75'; Karasavvidis 79' (pen.)			Stadium: Rizoupoli Stadium; Attendance: 1,077; Referee: Mintiouris

16 May 1992 31	Korinthos	1–1	PAOK	Corinth
	Papapanagis 68' (pen.)		Skartados 73' (pen.)	Stadium: Corinth Stadium; Referee: Vorgias

24 May 1992 32	PAOK	1–2	Olympiacos	Thessaloniki
	Lagonidis 75'		Savvidis 42'; Vaitsis 54'	Stadium: Toumba Stadium; Attendance: 8,577; Referee: Bikas
Note: This was PAOK first home defeat against rivals Olympiacos after a 24-game unbeaten run (21 wins/3 draws – 21 league matches/3 cup matches – goals 52/12) which lasted for 23 years.

31 May 1992 33	Panathinaikos	5–1	PAOK	Athens
	Saravakos 34', 42' (pen.), 84', 88'; Frantzeskos 60'		Toursounidis 54' (pen.)	Stadium: Athens Olympic Stadium; Attendance: 8,236; Referee: Zabetakis

7 June 1992 34	PAOK	2–2	AEK Athens	Thessaloniki
	Toursounidis 71'; Lagonidis 84'		Dimitriadis 65', 77'	Stadium: Toumba Stadium; Attendance: 6,184; Referee: Bikas

== Greek Cup ==
=== First round (group stage) ===
18 August 1991	Poseidon Michaniona	3–2	PAOK	Michaniona
	Bourdamis 34' (pen.); Trakas 74'; Kastanidis 83'		Leontiadis 43'; Skartados 86'

21 August 1991	PAOK	5–0	Poseidon Heraklion	Thessaloniki
	Skartados 29' (pen.), 42', 66'; Basbanas 77'; Toursounidis 89'			Stadium: Toumba Stadium; Attendance: 1,366; Referee: Rigas

25 August 1991	Olympiacos Volos	1–1	PAOK	Volos
	Garelis 55'		Borbokis 27'	Stadium: Volos Municipal Stadium; Referee: Sipkas

28 August 1991	PAOK	4–1	Messolonghi	Thessaloniki
	Mitoglou 13'; Lagonidis 52'; Skartados 61' (pen.); Alexoulis 77'		Mitsibonas 83' (o.g.)	Stadium: Toumba Stadium; Attendance: 1,217; Referee: Papaepameinondas

=== Second round ===
8 January 1992 1st leg	AFC Patra	0–1	PAOK	Patras
			Plitsis 61'	Attendance: 789; Referee: Borovilos

22 January 1992 2nd leg	PAOK	3–1 (4–1 agg.)	AFC Patra	Thessaloniki
	Borbokis 44', 81'; Alexiou 63'		Fikaris 29'	Stadium: Toumba Stadium; Attendance: 428; Referee: Papaepameinondas

=== Third round ===
5 February 1992 1st leg	PAOK	4–1	Korinthos	Thessaloniki
	Đurđević 2'; Skartados 14'; Kalogeropoulos 64'; Toursounidis 79'		Lupu 37'	Stadium: Toumba Stadium; Attendance: 1,987; Referee: Naziris

26 February 1992 2nd leg	Korinthos	0–0 (1–4 agg.)	PAOK	Corinth
				Stadium: Corinth Stadium; Attendance: 1,199; Referee: Katsikogiannis

=== Quarter-finals ===
11 March 1992 1st leg	Doxa Drama	2–0	PAOK	Drama
	Iordanidis 13'; Mouratidis 78'			Stadium: Doxa Drama Stadium; Attendance: 2,197

1 April 1992 2nd leg	PAOK	4–0 (4–2 agg.)	Doxa Drama	Thessaloniki
	Tolba 14' (pen.), 21'; Skartados 59'; Borbokis 74'		Mouratidis (penalty missed) 55'	Stadium: Toumba Stadium; Referee: Papaepameinondas

=== Semi-finals ===
15 April 1992 1st leg	AEK Athens	2–0	PAOK	Athens
	Alexandris 7'; Manolas 69'			Stadium: Nikos Goumas Stadium; Attendance: 15,153

29 April 1992 2nd leg	PAOK	3–0 (a.e.t.) (3–2 agg.)	AEK Athens	Thessaloniki
	Đurđević 16'; Alexiou 57', 103'			Stadium: Toumba Stadium; Attendance: 21,388; Referee: Arnakis

=== Final ===
20 May 1992 1st leg	PAOK	1–1	Olympiacos	Thessaloniki
18:00 EEST	Skartados 52'		Tsalouchidis 63'	Stadium: Toumba Stadium; Attendance: 25,744; Referee: Dimitriadis

27 May 1992 2nd leg	Olympiacos	2–0 (3–1 agg.)	PAOK	Piraeus
20:30 EEST	Litovchenko 21'; Tsalouchidis 62'; Savichev (red card) 69'			Stadium: Karaiskakis Stadium; Attendance: 29,831; Referee: Zakestidis

== UEFA Cup ==
=== First round ===
18 September 1991 1st leg	PAOK (Greece)	1–1	(Belgium) KV Mechelen	Thessaloniki, Greece
	Skartados 40'	Report	Ingesson 62'	Stadium: Toumba Stadium; Attendance: 17,000; Referee: Peter Mikkelsen (Denmark)

2 October 1991 2nd leg	KV Mechelen (Belgium)	0–1 (1–2 agg.)	(Greece) PAOK	Mechelen, Belgium
		Report	Borbokis 85'	Stadium: Achter de Kazerne; Attendance: 8,500; Referee: José Rosa dos Santos (Portugal)

=== Second round ===
23 October 1991 1st leg	PAOK (Greece)	0–2	(Austria) Swarovski Tirol	Thessaloniki, Greece
		Report	Westerthaler 52', 79'	Stadium: Toumba Stadium; Attendance: Behind closed doors Referee: Emilio Soriano Aladrén (Spain)
Note: PAOK played the match behind closed doors following UEFA's decision to charge them for the eye injury of a Belgian fan at Toumba Stadium in the previous round.

6 November 1991 2nd leg	Swarovski Tirol (Austria)	2–0 (4–0 agg.)	(Greece) PAOK	Innsbruck, Austria
	Westerthaler 27', 66'	Report	Borbokis (red card) 70'	Stadium: Old Tivoli Stadium; Attendance: 8,000; Referee: Vojtech Christov (Czechoslovakia)

== Statistics ==
=== Squad statistics ===
As of June 7, 1992

Appearances denote players in the starting lineup, with the numbers in parentheses denoting appearances as substitute.

No.	Name	Alpha Ethniki		Greek Cup		UEFA Cup		Total	
No.	Name	Apps	Goals	Apps	Goals	Apps	Goals	Apps	Goals
Goalkeepers
	(Croatia) Tonči Gabrić	31	0	12	0	4	0	47	0
	(Greece) Giannis Gitsioudis	4	0	1	0	0	0	5	0
	(Greece) Apostolos Terzis	0	0	1	0	0	0	1	0
Defenders
	(Greece) Georgios Mitsibonas	31	0	13	0	4	0	48	0
	(Greece) Alexis Alexiou	30	6	10	3	4	0	44	9
	(Greece) Michalis Leontiadis	23	2	12	1	4	0	39	3
	(Greece) Kostas Malioufas	24	1	11	0	3	0	38	1
	(Greece) Dimitris Mitoglou	15	0	6	1	3	0	24	1
	(Greece) Dimitris Palaskas	4	0	3	0	0	0	7	0
Midfielders
	(Greece) Giorgos Toursounidis	30	5	12	2	4	0	46	7
	(Greece) Georgios Skartados	29	9	12	8	4	1	45	18
	(Greece) Kostas Oikonomidis	29	1	12	0	2	0	43	1
	(Greece) Kostas Lagonidis	28	6	10	1	3	0	41	7
	(Greece) Nikos Plitsis	23	0	8	1	2	0	33	1
	(Greece) Christos Chionas	18	1	6	0	0	0	24	1
	(Egypt) Magdy Tolba	11	2	6	2	2	0	19	4
	(Greece) Giannis Alexoulis	5	0	3	1	3	0	11	1
	(Greece) Michalis Stergiou	2	0	1	0	0	0	3	0
Forwards
	(Greece) Stefanos Borbokis	30	3	13	4	4	1	47	8
	(Australia) John Anastasiadis	26	2	11	0	4	0	41	2
	(Federal Republic of Yugoslavia) Milan Đurđević	23	6	7	2	0	0	30	8
	(Greece) Athanasios Basbanas	13	0	3	1	1	0	17	1
	(Greece) Vangelis Kalogeropoulos	7	0	5	1	0	0	12	1
	(Greece) Vangelis Mylonas	2	0	1	0	0	0	3	0

Source: Match reports in competitive matches, RSSSF

=== Goalscorers ===
Rank	No.	Pos.	Player	Alpha Ethniki	Greek Cup	UEFA Cup	Total
1		MF	(Greece) Georgios Skartados	9	8	1	18
2		DF	(Greece) Alexis Alexiou	6	3	0	9
3		FW	(Federal Republic of Yugoslavia) Milan Đurđević	6	2	0	8
3		FW	(Greece) Stefanos Borbokis	3	4	1	8
5		MF	(Greece) Kostas Lagonidis	6	1	0	7
5		MF	(Greece) Giorgos Toursounidis	5	2	0	7
7		MF	(Egypt) Magdy Tolba	2	2	0	4
8		DF	(Greece) Michalis Leontiadis	2	1	0	3
9		FW	(Australia) John Anastasiadis	2	0	0	2
10		DF	(Greece) Kostas Malioufas	1	0	0	1
10		MF	(Greece) Kostas Oikonomidis	1	0	0	1
10		MF	(Greece) Christos Chionas	1	0	0	1
10		DF	(Greece) Dimitris Mitoglou	0	1	0	1
10		MF	(Greece) Nikos Plitsis	0	1	0	1
10		MF	(Greece) Giannis Alexoulis	0	1	0	1
10		FW	(Greece) Athanasios Basbanas	0	1	0	1
10		FW	(Greece) Vangelis Kalogeropoulos	0	1	0	1
TOTALS				44	28	2	74

Source: Match reports in competitive matches, RSSSF
