= 1990–91 PAOK FC season =

PAOK
1990–91 season
- President: Thomas Voulinos
- Manager: Rob Jacobs; Christos Terzanidis
- Stadium: Toumba Stadium
- Alpha Ethniki: 4th
- Greek Cup: Semi-finals
- UEFA Cup: 1st round
- Top goalscorer: League: Skartados (12); All: Skartados (17)
- Highest home attendance: 40,000 vs Sevilla
Home colours

The 1990–91 season was PAOK Football Club's 64th in existence and the club's 32nd consecutive season in the top flight of Greek football. The team entered the Greek Football Cup in first round and faced Sevilla in the UEFA Cup.

== Players ==
=== Squad ===
Note: Flags indicate national team as defined under FIFA eligibility rules; some limited exceptions apply. Players may hold more than one non-FIFA nationality.

No.	Pos.	Nation	Player
—	GK	GRE	Giannis Gitsioudis
—	GK	GRE	Apostolos Terzis
—	GK	GRE	Panagiotis Argyropoulos
—	DF	GRE	Alexis Alexiou
—	DF	GRE	Georgios Mitsibonas
—	DF	GRE	Kostas Malioufas
—	DF	GRE	Nikos Karageorgiou
—	DF	GRE	Dimitris Mitoglou
—	DF	GRE	Michalis Leontiadis
—	DF	EGY	Ibrahim Hassan
—	DF	GRE	Giannis Antonopoulos
—	DF	GRE	Dimitris Palaskas

No.	Pos.	Nation	Player
—	MF	GRE	Georgios Skartados (captain)
—	MF	GRE	Kostas Lagonidis
—	MF	EGY	Magdy Tolba
—	MF	GRE	Giannis Alexoulis
—	MF	GRE	Giorgos Toursounidis
—	MF	GRE	Nikos Plitsis
—	MF	GRE	Michalis Stergiou
—	FW	EGY	Hossam Hassan
—	FW	AUS	John Anastasiadis
—	FW	GRE	Stefanos Borbokis
—	FW	GRE	Athanasios Basbanas
—	FW	GRE	Vangelis Mylonas

== Transfers ==
Players transferred in

Transfer Window	Pos.	Name	Club	Fee
Summer	DF	(Greece) Giannis Antonopoulos	(Greece) Ethnikos	?
Summer	DF	(Egypt) Ibrahim Hassan	(Egypt) Al Ahly	?
Summer	FW	(Egypt) Hossam Hassan	(Egypt) Al Ahly	?
Winter	DF	(Greece) Alexis Alexiou	(Greece) Olympiacos	Free

Players transferred out

Transfer Window	Pos.	Name	Club	Fee
Summer	DF	(Greece) Nikos Lithoxopoulos	(Greece) Paniliakos	Free
Summer	FW	(Greece) Asterios Roussomanis	(Greece) Trikala	Free

== Pre-season ==
Win Draw Loss

23 July 1990 Friendly	Vitesse	2–3	PAOK	Netherlands

24 July 1990 Friendly	SV Zulte Waregem	1–2	PAOK	Netherlands

29 July 1990 Friendly	SBV Excelsior	1–2	PAOK	Netherlands

1 August 1990 Friendly	AZ Alkmaar	3–1	PAOK	Netherlands
			Toursounidis 67'

4 August 1990 Friendly	Dordrecht	3–6	PAOK	Netherlands

6 August 1990 Friendly	PAOK	2–2	Iraklis	Thessaloniki
	Leontiadis 58'; Skartados 79' (pen.)		Jovanović 48', 49'	Stadium: Toumba Stadium; Referee: Bikas

8 August 1990 Friendly	PAOK	1–0	AEK Athens	Thessaloniki
	Tolba 50'			Stadium: Toumba Stadium; Referee: Vournelis

13 August 1990 Friendly	AEK Athens	1–2	PAOK	Athens
	Pepes 21'		H.Hassan 55'; Anastasiadis 71'	Stadium: Nikos Goumas Stadium; Referee: Dimitriadis

16 August 1990 Friendly	PAOK	1–0	Panathinaikos	Thessaloniki
				Stadium: Toumba Stadium

19 August 1990 Friendly	Xanthi	1–1	PAOK	Xanthi
	Alavantas 90'		Basbanas 87'	Stadium: Xanthi Ground; Referee: Vellios

22 August 1990 Friendly	PAOK	2–0	Panserraikos	Thessaloniki
	Basbanas 62', 77'			Stadium: Toumba Stadium

== Competitions ==
=== Overview ===
Competition	Record							
Competition	Pld	W	D	L	GF	GA	GD	Win %
Alpha Ethniki	34	16	9	9	56	39	+17	47.06
Greek Cup	11	7	0	4	18	11	+7	63.64
UEFA Cup	2	0	2	0	0	0	+0	0.00
Total	47	23	11	13	74	50	+24	48.94

Source: Competitions

=== Managerial statistics ===
Head coach	From	To	Record							
Head coach	From	To	G	W	D	L	GF	GA	GD	Win %
(Netherlands) Rob Jacobs	Start of season	23.12.1990	18	9	4	5	28	21	+7	50.00
(Greece) Christos Terzanidis	30.12.1990	End of season	29	14	7	8	46	29	+17	48.28

== Alpha Ethniki ==
=== Standings ===
Pos	Team	Pld	W	D	L	GF	GA	GD	Pts	Qualification or relegation
2	Olympiacos (Note: Olympiacos were deducted 2 points.)	34	19	10	5	77	28	+49	46	One-year ban from European competitions (Note: Olympiacos were punished with a one-year ban from all European competitions by the UEFA disciplinary committee after being charged for the eventful European Cup Winners' Cup match against Sampdoria on 24 October 1990.)
3	AEK Athens	34	18	6	10	59	33	+26	42	Qualification for UEFA Cup first round
4	PAOK (Note: PAOK were deducted 3 points.)	34	16	9	9	56	39	+17	38	Qualification for UEFA Cup first round
5	Iraklis	34	14	9	11	40	36	+4	37	
6	Athinaikos	34	16	5	13	40	33	+7	37	Qualification for Cup Winners' Cup first round

Source: RSSSF
Rules for classification: 1st points; 2nd head-to-head points; 3rd head-to-head goal difference; 4th decision match.

==== Results summary ====
Overall								Home						Away					
Pld	W	D	L	GF	GA	GD	Pts	W	D	L	GF	GA	GD	W	D	L	GF	GA	GD
34	16	9	9	56	39	+17	57	12	4	1	34	14	+20	4	5	8	22	25	−3

Last updated: 2 June 1991.
Source: Competitive matches

==== Results by round ====
Round	1	2	3	4	5	6	7	8	9	10	11	12	13	14	15	16	17	18	19	20	21	22	23	24	25	26	27	28	29	30	31	32	33	34
Ground	H	A	H	A	H	H	A	H	A	H	A	H	A	A	H	A	H	A	H	A	H	A	A	H	A	H	A	H	A	H	H	A	H	A
Result	W	L	W	W	W	D	L	W	L	W	L	D	W	W	W	D	W	D	D	L	W	L	D	W	L	W	D	D	D	W	W	W	L	L
Position	3	12	16	12	8	7	9	7	9	8	10	10	8	7	4	5	5	5	5	5	5	5	5	5	5	5	5	6	6	6	4	4	4	4

Source: League matches
A = Away; H = Home; W = Win; D = Draw; L = Loss

==== Matches ====
Win Draw Loss

16 September 1990 1	PAOK	2–1	AEL	Thessaloniki
	Skartados 53', 57'		Agorogiannis 79' (pen.)	Stadium: Toumba Stadium; Attendance: 16,862; Referee: Vorgias

23 September 1990 2	Panathinaikos	3–0	PAOK	Athens
	Antoniou 36'; Saravakos 39'; Vlachos 56'		Skartados (red card) 75'; Tolba (red card) 75'	Stadium: Athens Olympic Stadium; Attendance: 31,314; Referee: Karamanis
Note: PAOK president Thomas Voulinos infuriated by Karamanis refereeing stormed the field in the 77th minute and ordered PAOK players to leave the pitch. The game was eventually abandoned and PAOK were later sentenced with a three point deduction and a 'five home games behind closed doors' penalty by court decision.

30 September 1990 3	PAOK	1–0	Panionios	Thessaloniki
	Mitsibonas (red card) 84'; Plitsis 90'			Stadium: Toumba Stadium; Attendance: 10,058; Referee: Bourountzoglou

7 October 1990 4	PAS Giannina	0–2	PAOK	Ioannina
			Anastasiadis 2', 41'	Stadium: Zosimades Stadium

17 October 1990 5	PAOK	4–1	Ionikos	Thessaloniki
	Borbokis 27', 82'; Tolba 35'; Tzanetoulakos 83' (o.g.)		Gribilas 75'	Stadium: Toumba Stadium; Attendance: 3,351; Referee: Syrmakezis

4 November 1990 6	PAOK	0–0	OFI	Thessaloniki
				Stadium: Toumba Stadium; Attendance: 10,819

11 November 1990 7	Apollon Athens	4–2	PAOK	Athens
	Katzenbach 5'; T.Karasavvidis 21'; A.Karasavvidis 39'; Athanasiadis 85'		Tolba (penalty missed) 15'; H.Hassan 19'; I.Hassan 71'	Stadium: Rizoupoli Stadium; Attendance: 2,828

25 November 1990 8	PAOK	4–1	Panachaiki	Thessaloniki
	Borbokis 6'; Tolba 50'; I.Hassan 67'; H.Hassan 74'		Vaitsis 58'	Stadium: Toumba Stadium; Attendance: 4,929

2 December 1990 9	Olympiacos	3–2	PAOK	Piraeus
	Mitropoulos 8'; Protasov 44'; Anastopoulos 73' (pen.)		Anastasiadis 75'; Toursounidis 80'	Stadium: Karaiskakis Stadium; Attendance: 23,974

9 December 1990 10	PAOK	2–1	Iraklis	Thessaloniki
	Leontiadis 38'; Skartados 89'		Boere 90'	Stadium: Toumba Stadium

16 December 1990 11	Doxa Drama	1–0	PAOK	Drama
	Oustabasidis 53'		I.Hassan (red card) 72'	Stadium: Doxa Drama Stadium; Referee: Filippidis

23 December 1990 12	PAOK	1–1	AEK Athens	Thessaloniki
	Mitsibonas 24'		Batista 43'	Stadium: Toumba Stadium; Attendance: 13,782; Referee: Vournelis

30 December 1990 13	Xanthi	1–2	PAOK	Xanthi
	Ouzounidis (penalty missed) 18'; Marinakis 47'		Tolba 7'; Anastasiadis 32'	Stadium: Xanthi Ground

6 January 1991 14	Aris	0–1	PAOK	Thessaloniki
			H.Hassan 45'	Stadium: Kleanthis Vikelidis Stadium; Attendance: 13,827; Referee: Voutsaras

13 January 1991 15	PAOK	1–0	Athinaikos	Thessaloniki
	Karageorgiou 37' (pen.)			Stadium: Toumba Stadium; Attendance: 9,381; Referee: Syrmakezis

27 January 1991 16	Levadiakos	2–2	PAOK	Livadeia
	Togias 1'; Barrios 8'		I.Hassan 56'; Lagonidis 74'	Stadium: Levadia Municipal Stadium; Attendance: 2,650; Referee: Filippiadis

3 February 1991 17	PAOK	1–0	Panserraikos	Thessaloniki
	I.Hassan 47'			Stadium: Toumba Stadium; Attendance: 2,821; Referee: Kannos

10 February 1991 18	AEL	1–1	PAOK	Larissa
	Petkov 54'		Lagonidis 90'	Stadium: Alcazar Stadium; Attendance: 5,181; Referee: Vrailas

17 February 1991 19	PAOK	1–1	Panathinaikos	Thessaloniki
	I.Hassan 89'		Georgakopoulos 74'	Stadium: Toumba Stadium; Attendance: 15,303

24 February 1991 20	Panionios	2–0	PAOK	Athens
	Papoulidis 21'; Magalhães 36'			Stadium: Nea Smyrni Stadium; Referee: Bentas

3 March 1991 21	PAOK	4–1	PAS Giannina	Thessaloniki
	I.Hassan 11'; Borbokis 33'; Karageorgiou 73' (pen.); Tolba 83'		Zois 78' (pen.)	Stadium: Toumba Stadium; Attendance: 2,211; Referee: Ntoutsias

10 March 1991 22	Ionikos	3–2	PAOK	Piraeus
	Kalogeropoulos 6', 70'; Gribilas 31'; Behlivanidis (red card) 32'; Papadopoulos (red card) 90'		Alexoulis (red card) 32'; Tolba 76'; H.Hassan 90'	Stadium: Neapoli Stadium; Attendance: 3,120; Referee: Karamanis

17 March 1991 23	OFI	0–0	PAOK	Heraklion
				Stadium: Theodoros Vardinogiannis Stadium; Attendance: 7,645; Referee: Giannopoulos

24 March 1991 24	PAOK	3–0	Apollon Athens	Thessaloniki
	Borbokis 6'; Karageorgiou 31'; Skartados 82'			Stadium: Toumba Stadium; Attendance: 4,503; Referee: Vorgias

31 March 1991 25	Panachaiki	3–2	PAOK	Patras
	Vaitsis 2' (pen.), 14'; Ottiji 25'; Karapitsas (red card) 68'		Karageorgiou 50' (pen.); Palaskas (red card) 69'; Basbanas 79'	Stadium: Kostas Davourlis Stadium; Referee: Bikas

10 April 1991 26	PAOK	3–2	Olympiacos	Thessaloniki
	Alexiou 3'; Skartados 67', 78'		Sofianopoulos 12'; Savichev (red card) 59'; Kofidis 88'	Stadium: Toumba Stadium; Attendance: 17,870; Referee: Nikakis

14 April 1991 27	Iraklis	0–0	PAOK	Thessaloniki
	Jovanović (penalty missed) 31'		Alexoulis (red card) 60'	Stadium: Kleanthis Vikelidis Stadium; Attendance: 7,589; Referee: Voutsaras

21 April 1991 28	PAOK	1–1	Doxa Drama	Thessaloniki
	Toursounidis 84'; Leontiadis (red card) 86'		Georgiadis 25'	Stadium: Toumba Stadium; Attendance: 3,474

28 April 1991 29	AEK Athens	0–0	PAOK	Athens
	Karagiannis (yellow card) 6' (yellow-red card) 74'			Stadium: Nikos Goumas Stadium; Attendance: 10,454; Referee: Giannopoulos

5 May 1991 30	PAOK	2–0	Xanthi	Thessaloniki
	Skartados 71'; Basbanas 83'			Stadium: Toumba Stadium; Attendance: 2,490; Referee: Latsios

12 May 1991 31	PAOK	2–1	Aris	Thessaloniki
	Skartados 57', 80'		Dimitriadis 21'	Stadium: Toumba Stadium; Attendance: 10,505; Referee: Ntoutsias

19 May 1991 32	Athinaikos	0–5	PAOK	Athens
			Skartados 6', 16'; Karageorgiou 72' (pen.); Borbokis 76', 87'	Stadium: Vyronas National Stadium

26 May 1991 33	PAOK	2–3	Levadiakos	Thessaloniki
	Skartados 31'; Anastasiadis 53'		Kavalieris 50' (pen.); Marinakis 65'; Pehlivanidis 80'	Stadium: Toumba Stadium; Attendance: 3,720; Referee: Iatropoulos

2 June 1991 34	Panserraikos	2–1	PAOK	Serres
	Petrunov 28'; Patinios 56'		H.Hassan 19'	Stadium: Serres Municipal Stadium; Attendance: 3,258; Referee: Charlavanis

== Greek Cup ==
=== First round (group stage) ===
26 August 1990	PAOK	2–1	OFI	Thessaloniki
	Tolba 15' (pen.), 55'		Vavoulas (yellow card) 31' (yellow-red card) 40'; Vlastos 67'	Stadium: Toumba Stadium

29 August 1990	PAOK	4–1	Makedonikos	Thessaloniki
	Karageorgiou 10'; H.Hassan 22'; Toursounidis 55'; Mitsibonas 71'		Strantzalis 72'	Stadium: Toumba Stadium

2 September 1990	Kalamata	1–2	PAOK	Kalamata
	Dedes 32'		Skartados 7', 28' (pen.)	Stadium: Kalamata Municipal Stadium; Referee: Kougios

=== Second round ===
5 December 1990 1st leg	Olympiacos	2–0	PAOK	Piraeus
	Tsiantakis 15'; Protasov 80'		H.Hassan (red card) 63'	Stadium: Karaiskakis Stadium; Attendance: 17,789; Referee: Nikakis

9 January 1991 2nd leg	PAOK	3–0 (3–2 agg.)	Olympiacos	Thessaloniki
	Karageorgiou 6' (pen.); Borbokis 43'; Leontiadis (red card) 44'; H.Hassan 52'		Mitropoulos (red card) 44'	Stadium: Toumba Stadium; Attendance: 33,411; Referee: Nikakis

=== Third round ===
30 January 1991 1st leg	Xanthi	2–1	PAOK	Xanthi
	Marcelo 30'; Alavantas 69'		I.Hassan 74'	Stadium: Xanthi Ground; Attendance: 3,738; Referee: Charlavanis

20 February 1991 2nd leg	PAOK	2–0 (3–2 agg.)	Xanthi	Thessaloniki
	Skartados 40', 49'			Stadium: Toumba Stadium; Attendance: 5,501

=== Quarter-finals ===
13 March 1991 1st leg	PAOK	3–0	AEL	Thessaloniki
	Lagonidis 41'; Borbokis 78'; Karageorgiou 83' (pen.)			Stadium: Toumba Stadium; Attendance: 6,034; Referee: Dimitriadis

20 March 1991 2nd leg	AEL	2–0 (2–3 agg.)	PAOK	Larissa
	Petkov 26'; Da Silva 90'		I.Hassan (red card) 42'	Stadium: Alcazar Stadium; Attendance: 4,344; Referee: Iatropoulos

=== Semi-finals ===
3 April 1991 1st leg	Panathinaikos	2–0	PAOK	Athens
	Antoniou 6'; Kourbanas 58'			Stadium: Athens Olympic Stadium; Attendance: 18,607

24 April 1991 2nd leg	PAOK	1–0 (1–2 agg.)	Panathinaikos	Thessaloniki
	Skartados 51'			Stadium: Toumba Stadium; Attendance: 25,918; Referee: Vasilakis

== UEFA Cup ==
=== First round ===
19 September 1990 1st leg	Sevilla (Spain)	0–0	(Greece) PAOK	Seville, Spain
20:45		Report		Stadium: Estadio Ramón Sánchez-Pizjuán; Attendance: 25,000; Referee: Helmut Kohl (Austria)

3 October 1990 2nd leg	PAOK (Greece)	0–0 (a.e.t.) (3–4 p)	(Spain) Sevilla	Thessaloniki, Greece
		Report		Stadium: Toumba Stadium; Attendance: 40,000; Referee: Bo Karlsson (Sweden)
	Penalties
	Skartados (penalty missed); Karageorgiou (penalty scored); Toursounidis (penalty scored); I.Hassan (penalty scored); Tolba (penalty missed)		(penalty missed) Bengoechea; (penalty scored) Salguero; (penalty scored) Polster; (penalty scored) Serrano; (penalty scored) Diego

== Statistics ==
=== Squad statistics ===
As of June 2, 1991

Appearances denote players in the starting lineup, with the numbers in parentheses denoting appearances as substitute.

No.	Name	Alpha Ethniki		Greek Cup		UEFA Cup		Total	
No.	Name	Apps	Goals	Apps	Goals	Apps	Goals	Apps	Goals
Goalkeepers
	(Greece) Giannis Gitsioudis	27	0	7	0	2	0	36	0
	(Greece) Apostolos Terzis	9	0	3	0	0	0	12	0
	(Greece) Panagiotis Argyropoulos	0	0	1	0	0	0	1	0
Defenders
	(Greece) Georgios Mitsibonas	32	1	10	1	2	0	44	2
	(Greece) Nikos Karageorgiou	30	5	10	3	2	0	42	8
	(Egypt) Ibrahim Hassan	24	6	9	1	2	0	35	7
	(Greece) Kostas Malioufas	19	0	6	0	1	0	26	0
	(Greece) Dimitris Mitoglou	18	0	5	0	2	0	25	0
	(Greece) Michalis Leontiadis	15	1	3	0	2	0	20	1
	(Greece) Alexis Alexiou	12	1	4	0	0	0	16	1
	(Greece) Dimitris Palaskas	3	0	1	0	0	0	4	0
	(Greece) Giannis Antonopoulos	3	0	1	0	0	0	4	0
Midfielders
	(Greece) Giorgos Toursounidis	32	2	10	1	2	0	44	3
	(Greece) Kostas Lagonidis	29	2	11	1	2	0	42	3
	(Greece) Giannis Alexoulis	28	0	7	0	2	0	37	0
	(Greece) Georgios Skartados	23	12	9	5	2	0	34	17
	(Egypt) Magdy Tolba	23	5	9	2	2	0	34	7
	(Greece) Nikos Plitsis	17	1	6	0	0	0	23	1
	(Greece) Michalis Stergiou	1	0	0	0	0	0	1	0
Forwards
	(Greece) Stefanos Borbokis	29	7	9	2	1	0	39	9
	(Australia) John Anastasiadis	28	5	9	0	2	0	39	5
	(Egypt) Hossam Hassan	19	5	8	2	0	0	27	7
	(Greece) Athanasios Basbanas	14	2	4	0	0	0	18	2
	(Greece) Vangelis Mylonas	1	0	0	0	0	0	1	0

Source: Match reports in competitive matches, RSSSF

=== Goalscorers ===
Rank	No.	Pos.	Player	Alpha Ethniki	Greek Cup	UEFA Cup	Total
1		MF	(Greece) Georgios Skartados	12	5	0	17
2		FW	(Greece) Stefanos Borbokis	7	2	0	9
3		DF	(Greece) Nikos Karageorgiou	5	3	0	8
4		DF	(Egypt) Ibrahim Hassan	6	1	0	7
4		MF	(Egypt) Magdy Tolba	5	2	0	7
4		FW	(Egypt) Hossam Hassan	5	2	0	7
7		FW	(Australia) John Anastasiadis	5	0	0	5
8		MF	(Greece) Kostas Lagonidis	2	1	0	3
8		MF	(Greece) Giorgos Toursounidis	2	1	0	3
10		FW	(Greece) Athanasios Basbanas	2	0	0	2
10		DF	(Greece) Georgios Mitsibonas	1	1	0	2
12		DF	(Greece) Alexis Alexiou	1	0	0	1
12		DF	(Greece) Michalis Leontiadis	1	0	0	1
12		MF	(Greece) Nikos Plitsis	1	0	0	1
Own goals				1	0	0	1
TOTALS				56	18	0	64

Source: Match reports in competitive matches, RSSSF
