= 1989–90 PAOK FC season =

PAOK
1989–90 season
- President: Thomas Voulinos
- Manager: Rob Jacobs
- Stadium: Toumba Stadium
- Alpha Ethniki: 3rd
- Greek Cup: Round of 16
- League Cup: 1st Round
- Top goalscorer: League: Georgios Skartados (15); All: Georgios Skartados (17)
- Highest home attendance: 35,346 vs AEK Athens

The 1989–90 season was PAOK Football Club's 63rd in existence and the club's 31st consecutive season in the top flight of Greek football. The team entered the Greek Football Cup in first round.

== Players ==
=== Squad ===
Note: Flags indicate national team as defined under FIFA eligibility rules; some limited exceptions apply. Players may hold more than one non-FIFA nationality.

No.	Pos.	Nation	Player
—	GK	GRE	Giannis Gitsioudis
—	GK	GRE	Apostolos Terzis
—	GK	GRE	Panagiotis Argyropoulos
—	DF	GRE	Nikos Alavantas (captain)
—	DF	GRE	Georgios Mitsibonas
—	DF	GRE	Kostas Malioufas
—	DF	GRE	Nikos Karageorgiou
—	DF	GRE	Dimitris Mitoglou
—	DF	GRE	Michalis Leontiadis
—	DF	GRE	Antonis Mavreas
—	DF	GRE	Dimitris Palaskas
—	DF	GRE	Nikos Lithoxopoulos
—	MF	GRE	Georgios Skartados
—	MF	GRE	Kostas Lagonidis
—	MF	EGY	Magdy Tolba

No.	Pos.	Nation	Player
—	MF	NOR	Kjetil Osvold
—	MF	GRE	Giannis Alexoulis
—	MF	GRE	Giorgos Toursounidis
—	MF	GRE	Nikos Plitsis
—	MF	GRE	Michalis Stergiou
—	MF	GRE	Stathis Voutsias
—	MF	EGY	Taha El Sayed
—	FW	ENG	Mike Small
—	FW	AUS	John Anastasiadis
—	FW	GRE	Stefanos Borbokis
—	FW	GRE	Aris Karasavvidis
—	FW	GRE	Athanasios Basbanas
—	FW	GRE	Asterios Roussomanis
—	FW	GRE	Vangelis Mylonas

== Transfers ==
Players transferred in

Transfer Window	Pos.	Name	Club	Fee
Summer	GK	(Greece) Panagiotis Argyropoulos	(Greece) Makedonikos	6 million Dr.
Summer	DF	(Greece) Dimitris Palaskas	(Greece) Makedonikos	6 million Dr.
Summer	DF	(Greece) Nikos Lithoxopoulos	(Greece) Makedonikos	6 million Dr.
Summer	MF	(Greece) Stathis Voutsias	(Greece) Makedonikos	6 million Dr.
Summer	DF	(Greece) Georgios Mitsibonas	(Greece) AEL	90 million Dr.
Summer	MF	(Greece) Giannis Alexoulis	(Greece) AEL	32 million Dr.
Summer	MF	(Egypt) Magdy Tolba	(Egypt) Zamalek SC	140.000$
Winter	MF	(Egypt) Taha El Sayed	(Egypt) Ghazl El Mahalla SC	?
Winter	FW	(Greece) Athanasios Basbanas	(Greece) Pierikos	?

Players transferred out

Transfer Window	Pos.	Name	Club	Fee
Summer	DF	(Greece) Giannis Tsiplakis	(Greece) Ethnikos	Free
Summer	DF	(Australia) Charlie Yankos	(Australia) Blacktown City	Free
Summer	DF	(Greece) Apostolos Tsourelas	(Greece) Aris	Free
Summer	MF	(Greece) Kyriakos Alexandridis	(Greece) Aris	Free
Summer	MF	(Brazil) Luís Fernando Abichabki	(Brazil) Athletico Paranaense	Free
Winter	DF	(Greece) Nikos Alavantas	(Greece) Xanthi	Free
Winter	DF	(Greece) Antonis Mavreas	(Greece) Ethnikos	Free
Winter	MF	(Norway) Kjetil Osvold	(Norway) Lillestrøm SK	Free
Winter	FW	(England) Mike Small	(England) Brighton	Free
Winter	FW	(Greece) Aris Karasavvidis	(Greece) Apollon Athens	Free

== Pre-season ==
Win Draw Loss

2 August 1989 Friendly	PAOK	2–0	Aris	Thessaloniki
	Mitoglou 24'; Tolba 63'			Stadium: Toumba Stadium; Referee: Plevritis

4 August 1989 Friendly	Xanthi	1–2	PAOK	Xanthi
				Stadium: Xanthi Ground

5 August 1989 Friendly	Panserraikos	2–2	PAOK	Serres
	Chatzioannidis 40'; Karabelas 51'		Karasavvidis 22'; Skartados 70' (pen.)	Stadium: Serres Municipal Stadium; Referee: Massouras

7 August 1989 Friendly	PAOK	2–1	Iraklis	Thessaloniki
	Skartados 13' (pen.); Small 83'		Toutziaris 49'	Stadium: Toumba Stadium; Referee: Zakestidis

9 August 1989 Friendly	PAOK	1–2	AEL	Thessaloniki
	Osvold 69'		Karapialis 49', 63'	Stadium: Toumba Stadium; Referee: Naziris

13 August 1989 Friendly	AEL	2–1	PAOK	Larissa
				Stadium: Alcazar Stadium

== Competitions ==
=== Overview ===
Competition	Record							
Competition	Pld	W	D	L	GF	GA	GD	Win %
Alpha Ethniki	34	19	8	7	49	26	+23	55.88
Greek Cup	8	4	2	2	9	3	+6	50.00
League Cup	1	0	0	1	0	2	−2	0.00
Total	43	23	10	10	58	31	+27	53.49

Source: Competitions

== Alpha Ethniki ==
=== Standings ===
Pos	Team	Pld	W	D	L	GF	GA	GD	Pts	Qualification or relegation
1	Panathinaikos (C)	34	21	11	2	75	35	+40	53	Qualification for European Cup first round
2	AEK Athens	34	20	10	4	64	18	+46	50	One-year ban from European competitions (Note: AEK Athens were punished with a one-year ban from all European competitions by the UEFA disciplinary committee after being charged for the eventful European Cup match against Marseille on 1 November 1989.)
3	PAOK	34	19	8	7	49	26	+23	46	Qualification for UEFA Cup first round
4	Olympiacos	34	18	9	7	60	37	+23	45	Qualification for Cup Winners' Cup first round
5	Iraklis	34	14	11	9	44	36	+8	39	Qualification for UEFA Cup first round

Source: RSSSF
Rules for classification: 1st points; 2nd head-to-head points; 3rd head-to-head goal difference; 4th decision match.
(C) Champions

==== Results summary ====
Overall								Home						Away					
Pld	W	D	L	GF	GA	GD	Pts	W	D	L	GF	GA	GD	W	D	L	GF	GA	GD
34	19	8	7	49	26	+23	65	12	3	2	31	11	+20	7	5	5	18	15	+3

Last updated: 27 May 1990.
Source: Competitive matches

==== Results by round ====
Round	1	2	3	4	5	6	7	8	9	10	11	12	13	14	15	16	17	18	19	20	21	22	23	24	25	26	27	28	29	30	31	32	33	34
Ground	H	A	H	H	A	H	A	H	A	H	A	A	H	A	H	A	H	A	H	A	A	H	A	H	A	H	A	H	H	A	H	A	H	A
Result	D	L	W	W	W	W	D	W	L	W	W	D	W	W	W	W	W	L	D	W	D	L	W	W	L	W	W	W	W	D	D	L	L	D
Position	8	14	13	10	7	4	4	2	4	4	4	4	4	4	4	4	1	4	4	4	4	4	4	4	4	4	4	3	2	3	3	3	4	3

Source: League matches
A = Away; H = Home; W = Win; D = Draw; L = Loss

==== Matches ====
Win Draw Loss

17 September 1989 1	PAOK	1–1	AEK Athens	Thessaloniki
	Skartados 30' (pen.)		Okoński 72'	Stadium: Toumba Stadium; Attendance: 35,346; Referee: Nikakis

24 September 1989 2	Apollon Athens	2–0	PAOK	Athens
	Konstantopoulos 44'; Vlachos 54' (pen.)			Stadium: Rizoupoli Stadium; Attendance: 3,995; Referee: Bourountzoglou

1 October 1989 3	PAOK	2–1	Apollon Kalamaria	Thessaloniki
	Small 14'; Tolba 27'		Nolis 77'	Stadium: Toumba Stadium; Attendance: Behind closed doors Referee: Kefalas

8 October 1989 4	PAOK	2–1	Levadiakos	Thessaloniki
	Small 22'; Tolba 62'		Ziogas 58'	Stadium: Toumba Stadium; Attendance: 5,100

15 October 1989 5	Ethnikos Piraeus	0–1	PAOK	Piraeus
			Skartados 73'	Stadium: Karaiskakis Stadium; Attendance: 6,844

22 October 1989 6	PAOK	3–0	AEL	Thessaloniki
	Baran 2' (o.g.); Skartados 28'; Small 47'			Stadium: Toumba Stadium; Attendance: 15,878; Referee: Bikas

29 October 1989 7	Iraklis	0–0	PAOK	Thessaloniki
				Stadium: Kaftanzoglio Stadium; Attendance: 18,711

8 November 1989 8	PAOK	2–0	Aris	Thessaloniki
	Alexoulis 56'; Karageorgiou 85'			Stadium: Toumba Stadium; Attendance: 15,259; Referee: Germanakos

12 November 1989 9	Olympiacos	4–0	PAOK	Piraeus
	Alexiou 12'; Mitropoulos 32'; Anastopoulos 47', 74'			Stadium: Karaiskakis Stadium; Attendance: 30,716; Referee: Germanakos

19 November 1989 10	PAOK	1–0	Panionios	Thessaloniki
	Skartados 80'			Stadium: Toumba Stadium; Attendance: 7,142; Referee: Kannos

26 November 1989 11	Doxa Drama	0–2	PAOK	Drama
			Skartados 28'; Mitsibonas 66'	Stadium: Doxa Drama Stadium; Attendance: 5,450; Referee: Vasilakis

3 December 1989 12	OFI	0–0	PAOK	Heraklion
				Stadium: Theodoros Vardinogiannis Stadium; Attendance: 6,954; Referee: Plevritis

10 December 1989 13	PAOK	3–1	Panserraikos	Thessaloniki
	Alexoulis 8'; Skartados 44'; Anastasiadis 90'		Aliatidis 40'	Stadium: Toumba Stadium; Attendance: 5,986; Referee: Kannos

17 December 1989 14	Ionikos	0–2	PAOK	Piraeus
			Leontiadis 19'; Skartados 81'	Stadium: Neapoli Stadium; Attendance: 5,319

7 January 1990 15	PAOK	3–0	Olympiacos Volos	Thessaloniki
	Skartados 4' (pen.); Toursounidis 57'; Borbokis 67'			Stadium: Toumba Stadium; Referee: Adamopoulos

14 January 1990 16	Xanthi	0–2	PAOK	Xanthi
			Tolba 42'; Borbokis 90'	Stadium: Xanthi Ground; Attendance: 10,793; Referee: Naziris

21 January 1990 17	PAOK	2–1	Panathinaikos	Thessaloniki
	Tolba 22'; Palaskas 66'		Georgakopoulos 11'; Christodoulou (red card) 75'	Stadium: Toumba Stadium; Attendance: 25,100; Referee: Nikakis

28 January 1990 18	AEK Athens	2–1	PAOK	Athens
	Batista 2'; Savevski 85'; Peppes (red card) 89'		Mitsibonas 11'	Stadium: Nikos Goumas Stadium; Attendance: 18,255; Referee: Germanakos

4 February 1990 19	PAOK	1–1	Apollon Athens	Thessaloniki
	Lagonidis 11'		Katzenbach 27'	Stadium: Toumba Stadium; Attendance: Behind closed doors Referee: Dimitriadis

11 February 1990 20	Apollon Kalamaria	0–3	PAOK	Thessaloniki
	Traianopoulos (red card) 73'		Toursounidis 2'; Lagonidis 37'; Anastasiadis 80'	Stadium: Kalamaria Stadium; Attendance: 6,404; Referee: Bourountzoglou

18 February 1990 21	Levadiakos	1–1	PAOK	Livadeia
	Lemonis 28'		Skartados 67'	Stadium: Levadia Municipal Stadium; Attendance: 3,314; Referee: Kortsaris

25 February 1990 22	PAOK	0–1	Ethnikos Piraeus	Thessaloniki
			Mellos 65'	Stadium: Toumba Stadium; Attendance: 6,437; Referee: Syrmakezis

4 March 1990 23	AEL	0–1	PAOK	Larissa
			Skartados 12'	Stadium: Alcazar Stadium; Attendance: 6,142; Referee: Kougios

11 March 1990 24	PAOK	2–1	Iraklis	Thessaloniki
	Skartados 10' (pen.), 53'		Jovanović (penalty missed) 76'; Anastasiadis 84'	Stadium: Toumba Stadium; Attendance: 13,125; Referee: Karamanis

18 March 1990 25	Aris	1–0	PAOK	Thessaloniki
	Dimitriadis 87'			Stadium: Kleanthis Vikelidis Stadium; Attendance: 9,273; Referee: Giannopoulos

25 March 1990 26	PAOK	4–1	Olympiacos	Thessaloniki
	Lagonidis 10'; Skartados 35', 39' (penalty missed) 39'; Alexoulis 47'		Mitropoulos 11'	Stadium: Toumba Stadium; Attendance: 17,169; Referee: Bikas

1 April 1990 27	Panionios	1–3	PAOK	Athens
	Mavros 25'		Skartados 1'; Mitoglou 77'; Plitsis 82'	Stadium: Nea Smyrni Stadium; Referee: Bourountzoglou

10 April 1990 28	PAOK	3–1	Doxa Drama	Thessaloniki
	Anastasiadis 12', 52'; Papatheodorou 61' (o.g.)		Chionas 30'	Stadium: Toumba Stadium; Attendance: 4,763; Referee: Syrmakezis

22 April 1990 29	PAOK	2–0	OFI	Thessaloniki
	Anastasiadis 32'; Toursounidis 74'			Stadium: Toumba Stadium; Attendance: 7,150; Referee: Filippiadis

29 April 1990 30	Panserraikos	0–0	PAOK	Serres
				Stadium: Serres Municipal Stadium; Attendance: 9,798; Referee: Kougios

6 May 1990 31	PAOK	0–0	Ionikos	Thessaloniki
				Stadium: Toumba Stadium; Attendance: 5,994; Referee: Filippiadis

13 May 1990 32	Olympiacos Volos	2–0	PAOK	Volos
	Tahos 47'; Karachalios (red card) 79'; Peridis 84'		Mitsibonas (red card) 79'	Stadium: Volos Municipal Stadium; Attendance: 2,855; Referee: Adamopoulos

20 May 1990 33	PAOK	0–1	Xanthi	Thessaloniki
			Baniotis 15'	Stadium: Toumba Stadium; Attendance: 3,046

27 May 1990 34	Panathinaikos	2–2	PAOK	Athens
	Saravakos 68', 72' (pen.)		Lagonidis 5'; Malioufas 14'	Stadium: Athens Olympic Stadium; Attendance: 32,141; Referee: Charlavanis

== Greek Cup ==
=== First round (group stage) ===
20 August 1989	PAOK	5–0	Anagennisi Giannitsa	Thessaloniki
	Small 36', 46'; Mitsibonas 50'; Skartados 52' (pen.), 68' (pen.)			Stadium: Toumba Stadium; Attendance: 2,091; Referee: Mintiouris

27 August 1989	Egaleo	1–1	PAOK	Athens
	Pistolis 70'		Karageorgiou 24'	Stadium: Stavros Mavrothalassitis Stadium

2 September 1989	PAOK	0–0	Kozani	Thessaloniki
				Stadium: Toumba Stadium; Referee: Zakestidis

4 October 1989	Panelefsiniakos	0–1	PAOK	West Attica
			Tolba 60'	Stadium: Elefsina Municipal Stadium

=== Second round ===
29 November 1989 1st leg	PAOK	1–0	Sparti	Thessaloniki
	Leontiadis 89' (pen.)			Stadium: Toumba Stadium; Referee: Naziris

20 December 1989 2nd leg	Sparti	1–0 (a.e.t.) (1–1 agg.) (0–2 p)	PAOK	Sparta
	Georgoulis 64'			Stadium: Sparta Municipal Stadium; Referee: Koukoulakis
	Penalties
	Katsichtis (penalty missed); Kelesidis (penalty missed); Demestichas (penalty missed); Stavropoulos (penalty missed)		(penalty scored) Skartados; (penalty missed) Leontiadis; (penalty scored) Mitoglou

=== Third round ===
10 January 1990 1st leg	PAOK	1–0	Olympiacos	Thessaloniki
	Lagonidis 13'			Stadium: Toumba Stadium; Attendance: 27,217; Referee: Koukoulakis

24 January 1990 2nd leg	Olympiacos	1–0 (a.e.t.) (1–1 agg.) (5–3 p)	PAOK	Piraeus
	Moustakidis 67'			Stadium: Karaiskakis Stadium; Attendance: 22,090; Referee: Zakestidis
	Penalties
	Détári (penalty scored); Pachatouridis (penalty scored); Tsiantakis (penalty scored); Kofidis (penalty scored); Apostolakis (penalty scored)		(penalty scored) Skartados; (penalty missed) Mitoglou; (penalty scored) Toursounidis; (penalty scored) Lagonidis

== Greek League Cup ==
=== First round ===
31 January 1990	PAOK	0–2	Panathinaikos	Thessaloniki
	Lagonidis (penalty missed) 58'		Polak 26'; Saravakos (penalty missed) 33' 78'	Stadium: Toumba Stadium; Attendance: Behind closed doors Referee: Christos Kolokythas (Athens)

== Statistics ==
=== Squad statistics ===
As of May 27, 1990

Appearances denote players in the starting lineup, with the numbers in parentheses denoting appearances as substitute.

No.	Name	Alpha Ethniki		Greek Cup		League Cup		Total	
No.	Name	Apps	Goals	Apps	Goals	Apps	Goals	Apps	Goals
Goalkeepers
	(Greece) Giannis Gitsioudis	34	0	6	0	0	0	40	0
	(Greece) Apostolos Terzis	0	0	1	0	1	0	2	0
	(Greece) Panagiotis Argyropoulos	0	0	1	0	0	0	1	0
Defenders
	(Greece) Kostas Malioufas	31	1	8	0	1	0	40	1
	(Greece) Georgios Mitsibonas	32	2	6	1	0	0	38	3
	(Greece) Dimitris Mitoglou	28	1	5	0	1	0	34	1
	(Greece) Nikos Karageorgiou	26	1	5	1	0	0	31	2
	(Greece) Michalis Leontiadis	17	1	6	1	0	0	23	2
	(Greece) Dimitris Palaskas	14	1	1	0	1	0	16	1
	(Greece) Nikos Alavantas	4	0	3	0	0	0	7	0
	(Greece) Antonis Mavreas	2	0	2	0	0	0	4	0
	(Greece) Nikos Lithoxopoulos	2	0	1	0	1	0	4	0
Midfielders
	(Greece) Georgios Skartados	33	15	7	2	0	0	40	17
	(Greece) Kostas Lagonidis	33	4	5	1	1	0	39	5
	(Egypt) Magdy Tolba	32	4	6	1	0	0	38	5
	(Greece) Giannis Alexoulis	25	3	8	0	0	0	33	3
	(Greece) Giorgos Toursounidis	23	3	4	0	1	0	28	3
	(Greece) Nikos Plitsis	14	1	0	0	1	0	15	1
	(Norway) Kjetil Osvold	5	0	5	0	0	0	10	0
	(Egypt) Taha El Sayed	4	0	0	0	0	0	4	0
	(Greece) Michalis Stergiou	2	0	0	0	1	0	3	0
	(Greece) Stathis Voutsias	0	0	1	0	1	0	2	0
Forwards
	(Greece) Stefanos Borbokis	32	2	8	0	1	0	41	2
	(Australia) John Anastasiadis	25	5	5	0	1	0	31	5
	(England) Mike Small	7	3	4	2	0	0	11	5
	(Greece) Aris Karasavvidis	5	0	1	0	0	0	6	0
	(Greece) Athanasios Basbanas	0	0	1	0	0	0	1	0
	(Greece) Vangelis Mylonas	0	0	0	0	1	0	1	0

Source: Match reports in competitive matches, RSSSF

=== Goalscorers ===
Rank	No.	Pos.	Player	Alpha Ethniki	Greek Cup	Total
1		MF	(Greece) Georgios Skartados	15	2	17
2		FW	(Australia) John Anastasiadis	5	0	5
2		MF	(Egypt) Magdy Tolba	4	1	5
2		MF	(Greece) Kostas Lagonidis	4	1	5
2		FW	(England) Mike Small	3	2	5
6		MF	(Greece) Giorgos Toursounidis	3	0	3
6		MF	(Greece) Giannis Alexoulis	3	0	3
6		DF	(Greece) Georgios Mitsibonas	2	1	3
9		FW	(Greece) Stefanos Borbokis	2	0	2
9		DF	(Greece) Nikos Karageorgiou	1	1	2
9		DF	(Greece) Michalis Leontiadis	1	1	2
12		DF	(Greece) Dimitris Mitoglou	1	0	1
12		DF	(Greece) Kostas Malioufas	1	0	1
12		DF	(Greece) Dimitris Palaskas	1	0	1
12		MF	(Greece) Nikos Plitsis	1	0	1
Own goals				2	0	2
TOTALS				49	9	58

Source: Match reports in competitive matches, RSSSF
