= 1992–93 PAOK FC season =

Greek football club 1992–93 season

PAOK
1992–93 season
- President: Thomas Voulinos
- Manager: Ljupko Petrović; Nikos Zalikas; Oleg Blokhin
- Stadium: Toumba Stadium
- Alpha Ethniki: 5th
- Greek Cup: 2nd round
- UEFA Cup: 1st round
- Top goalscorer: League: Milan Đurđević (11); All: Milan Đurđević (13)
- Highest home attendance: 30,000 vs Paris Saint-Germain

The 1992–93 season was PAOK Football Club's 66th in existence and the club's 34th consecutive season in the top flight of Greek football. The team entered the Greek Football Cup in first round and faced Paris Saint-Germain in the 1st round of the UEFA Cup. The season was marked by the eventful second leg tie against Paris Saint-Germain which was abandoned after 51 mins due to crowd violence. PAOK were punished with a two-year ban from all European competitions by the UEFA disciplinary committee. The sentence was later reduced to one year.

== Players ==
=== Squad ===
Note: Flags indicate national team as defined under FIFA eligibility rules; some limited exceptions apply. Players may hold more than one non-FIFA nationality.

| No. | Pos. | Nation | Player |
|---|---|---|---|
| — | GK | CRO | Tonči Gabrić |
| — | GK | GRE | Vangelis Pourliotopoulos |
| — | GK | GRE | Nikolaos Michopoulos |
| — | DF | GRE | Alexis Alexiou (captain) |
| — | DF | GRE | Kostas Malioufas |
| — | DF | GRE | Makis Chavos |
| — | DF | GRE | Michalis Leontiadis |
| — | DF | GRE | Dimitrios Kapetanopoulos |
| — | DF | GRE | Nikos Panagiotidis |
| — | DF | GRE | Kostas Iliadis |
| — | DF | GRE | Giannis Papoulidis |
| — | DF | GRE | Dimitris Palaskas |
| — | DF | GRE | Vasilios Pekridis |
| — | MF | GRE | Kostas Lagonidis |
| — | MF | EGY | Magdy Tolba |

| No. | Pos. | Nation | Player |
|---|---|---|---|
| — | MF | GRE | Giorgos Toursounidis |
| — | MF | GRE | Theodoros Zagorakis |
| — | MF | GRE | Kostas Oikonomidis |
| — | MF | GRE | Christos Chionas |
| — | MF | GRE | Nikos Plitsis |
| — | FW | YUG | Milan Đurđević |
| — | FW | AUS | John Anastasiadis |
| — | FW | GRE | Stefanos Borbokis |
| — | FW | GRE | Thanasis Dimopoulos |
| — | FW | GRE | Pavlos Dermitzakis |
| — | FW | GRE | Vangelis Kalogeropoulos |
| — | FW | GRE | Dimitris Konstantinidis |
| — | FW | GRE | Michalis Gekas |
| — | FW | GRE | Vangelis Mylonas |

== Transfers ==
Players transferred in

| Transfer Window | Pos. | Name | Club | Fee |
|---|---|---|---|---|
| Summer | GK | (Greece) Vangelis Pourliotopoulos | (Greece) AO Panorama | ? |
| Summer | DF | (Greece) Makis Chavos | (Greece) Panserraikos | ? |
| Summer | DF | (Greece) Dimitrios Kapetanopoulos | (Greece) Panargiakos | ? |
| Summer | DF | (Greece) Nikos Panagiotidis | (Greece) Anagennisi Giannitsa | ? |
| Summer | DF | (Greece) Kostas Iliadis | (Greece) Iraklis | Free |
| Summer | FW | (Greece) Thanasis Dimopoulos | (Greece) Iraklis | Free |
| Summer | FW | (Greece) Pavlos Dermitzakis | (Greece) Kavala | ? |
| Summer | FW | (Greece) Dimitris Konstantinidis | (Greece) AEL | ? |
| Winter | GK | (Greece) Nikolaos Michopoulos | (Greece) Apollon Larissa | ? |
| Winter | DF | (Greece) Giannis Papoulidis | (Greece) Panionios | ? |
| Winter | MF | (Greece) Theodoros Zagorakis | (Greece) Kavala | 70 million Dr. |
| Winter | FW | (Greece) Michalis Gekas | (Greece) Aris | ? |
| Winter | MF | (Greece) Vasilios Pekridis | (Greece) PAOK B | |

Players transferred out

| Transfer Window | Pos. | Name | Club | Fee |
|---|---|---|---|---|
| Summer | GK | (Greece) Giannis Gitsioudis | | Retired |
| Summer | GK | (Greece) Apostolos Terzis | (Greece) Panachaiki | Loan |
| Summer | DF | (Greece) Georgios Mitsibonas | (Greece) Olympiacos | Free |
| Summer | DF | (Greece) Dimitris Mitoglou | (Greece) Irodotos | Free |
| Summer | MF | (Greece) Georgios Skartados | (Greece) Iraklis | Free |
| Winter | DF | (Greece) Michalis Leontiadis | (Greece) Ionikos | Free |
| Winter | MF | (Greece) Christos Chionas | (Greece) Xanthi | Free |

== Pre-season ==
Win Draw Loss

| 24 July 1992 Friendly | TSV Fulpmes | 2–11 | PAOK | Austria |
| | | | Chionas; Tolba; Th.Dimopoulos; Kalogeropoulos; Leontiadis; Dermitzakis; Kapetanopoulos |

| 26 July 1992 Friendly | Hamburger SV | 0–1 | PAOK | Bolzano, Italy |
| | | | Leontiadis 21' |

| 28 July 1992 Friendly | SV Haiming | 0–7 | PAOK | Austria |
| | | | Đurđević (pen.) (pen.); Tolba; Borbokis; Th.Dimopoulos; Leontiadis; Aptidis |

| 2 August 1992 Friendly | Plaurling | 0–14 | PAOK | Austria |
| | | | Th.Dimopoulos 4', 35', 37'; Leontiadis 8'; Chavos 25'; Kalogeropoulos 54', 87'; Đurđević 63'; Toursounidis 64'; Tolba 65' (pen.), 77', 85'; Chionas 67'; Aptidis 84' |

| 6 August 1992 Friendly | PAOK | 3–2 | Aris | Thessaloniki |
| | Th.Dimopoulos 27'; Toursounidis 32'; Đurđević 81' | | Koltsidas 4'; Lončar 67' | Stadium: Toumba Stadium; Referee: Naziris |

| 10 August 1992 Friendly | AEK Athens | 4–1 | PAOK | Athens |
| | Slišković 11'; Šabanadžović 60'; Stamatis 63'; Dimitriadis 85' | | Chionas 86' | Stadium: Nikos Goumas Stadium; Referee: Vorgias |

| 12 August 1992 Friendly | Kavala | 0–1 | PAOK | Kavala |
| | | | Đurđević 48' | Stadium: Anthi Karagianni Stadium |

| 30 August 1992 Friendly | Panserraikos | 0–4 | PAOK | Serres |
| | | | Th.Dimopoulos 25'; Borbokis 53', 65', 85' | Stadium: Serres Municipal Stadium; Referee: Mintiouris |

== Competitions ==
=== Overview ===
| Competition | Record | | | | | | | |
| Competition | Pld | W | D | L | GF | GA | GD | Win % |
|---|---|---|---|---|---|---|---|---|
| Alpha Ethniki | 34 | 17 | 6 | 11 | 52 | 38 | +14 | 50.00 |
| Greek Cup | 5 | 2 | 3 | 0 | 13 | 6 | +7 | 40.00 |
| UEFA Cup | 2 | 0 | 0 | 2 | 0 | 5 | −5 | 0.00 |
| Total | 41 | 19 | 9 | 13 | 65 | 49 | +16 | 46.34 |

Source: Competitions

=== Managerial statistics ===
| Head coach | From | To | Record | | | | | | | |
| Head coach | From | To | G | W | D | L | GF | GA | GD | Win % |
|---|---|---|---|---|---|---|---|---|---|---|
| (Federal Republic of Yugoslavia) Ljupko Petrović | Start of season | 24.01.1993 | 26 | 10 | 6 | 10 | 42 | 33 | +9 | 38.46 |
| (Greece) Nikos Zalikas (Interim) | 25.01.1993 | 30.01.1993 | 1 | 1 | 0 | 0 | 2 | 1 | +1 | 100.00 |
| (Ukraine) Oleg Blokhin | 07.02.1993 | End of season | 14 | 8 | 3 | 3 | 21 | 15 | +6 | 57.14 |

== Alpha Ethniki ==
=== Standings ===
| Pos | Team | Pld | W | D | L | GF | GA | GD | Pts | Qualification or relegation |
|---|---|---|---|---|---|---|---|---|---|---|
| 3 | Olympiacos | 34 | 20 | 8 | 6 | 68 | 31 | +37 | 68 | Qualification for UEFA Cup first round |
| 4 | OFI | 34 | 19 | 9 | 6 | 64 | 32 | +32 | 66 | Qualification for UEFA Cup first round |
| 5 | PAOK | 34 | 17 | 6 | 11 | 52 | 38 | +14 | 57 | |
| 6 | Iraklis | 34 | 16 | 8 | 10 | 51 | 41 | +10 | 56 | |
| 7 | AEL | 34 | 11 | 10 | 13 | 36 | 42 | −6 | 43 | |

Source: RSSSF
Rules for classification: 1st points; 2nd head-to-head points; 3rd head-to-head goal difference; 4th decision match.

==== Results summary ====
| Overall | | | | | | | | Home | | | | | | Away | | | | | |
| Pld | W | D | L | GF | GA | GD | Pts | W | D | L | GF | GA | GD | W | D | L | GF | GA | GD |
|---|---|---|---|---|---|---|---|---|---|---|---|---|---|---|---|---|---|---|---|
| 34 | 17 | 6 | 11 | 52 | 38 | +14 | 57 | 12 | 3 | 2 | 37 | 9 | +28 | 5 | 3 | 9 | 15 | 29 | −14 |

Last updated: 6 June 1993.
Source: Competitive matches

==== Results by round ====
| Round | 1 | 2 | 3 | 4 | 5 | 6 | 7 | 8 | 9 | 10 | 11 | 12 | 13 | 14 | 15 | 16 | 17 | 18 | 19 | 20 | 21 | 22 | 23 | 24 | 25 | 26 | 27 | 28 | 29 | 30 | 31 | 32 | 33 | 34 |
|---|---|---|---|---|---|---|---|---|---|---|---|---|---|---|---|---|---|---|---|---|---|---|---|---|---|---|---|---|---|---|---|---|---|---|
| Ground | H | A | H | A | H | A | H | H | A | H | A | H | A | H | A | A | H | A | H | A | H | A | H | A | A | H | A | H | A | H | A | H | H | A |
| Result | W | L | W | L | W | W | D | W | L | W | L | L | L | D | W | L | W | D | L | W | D | W | W | L | D | W | W | W | L | W | L | W | W | D |
| Position | 1 | 8 | 6 | 9 | 5 | 4 | 6 | 4 | 5 | 4 | 5 | 7 | 7 | 7 | 6 | 6 | 6 | 6 | 7 | 6 | 6 | 6 | 6 | 6 | 6 | 6 | 6 | 6 | 6 | 6 | 6 | 6 | 6 | 5 |

Source: League matches
A = Away; H = Home; W = Win; D = Draw; L = Loss

==== Matches ====
Win Draw Loss

| 6 September 1992 1 | PAOK | 3–0 | Panachaiki | Thessaloniki |
| | Đurđević 27', 62'; Toursounidis 90' | | Maričić (yellow card) 16' (yellow-red card) 18' | Stadium: Toumba Stadium; Referee: Bikas |

| 12 September 1992 2 | OFI | 4–0 | PAOK | Heraklion |
| | Georgamlis (penalty missed) 38'; Đukanović (red card) 39'; Leontiadis 45+2' (o.g.); Machlas 51', 59'; Patemtzis 89'; Papavasiliou (red card) 90' | | | Stadium: Theodoros Vardinogiannis Stadium; Attendance: 3,985; Referee: Latsios |

| 20 September 1992 3 | PAOK | 3–0 | Pierikos | Thessaloniki |
| | Đurđević 37'; Lagonidis 61'; Toursounidis 88' | | | Stadium: Toumba Stadium; Attendance: 6,171; Referee: Kougios |

| 27 September 1992 4 | AEL | 2–1 | PAOK | Larissa |
| | Issa 31', 79' | | Đurđević 3' | Stadium: Alcazar Stadium |

| 11 October 1992 5 | PAOK | 4–1 | Xanthi | Thessaloniki |
| | Kalogeropoulos 1', 67'; Alexiou 24'; Chionas 88' | | Marcelo 82' | Stadium: Toumba Stadium; Attendance: 2,040 |

| 18 October 1992 6 | Ionikos | 0–1 | PAOK | Piraeus |
| | | | Chionas 88' | Stadium: Neapoli Stadium |

| 25 October 1992 7 | PAOK | 1–1 | Panathinaikos | Thessaloniki |
| | Alexiou 66' | | Christodoulou 36' | Stadium: Toumba Stadium; Attendance: 8,054 |

| 1 November 1992 8 | PAOK | 2–0 | Apollon Kalamaria | Thessaloniki |
| | Đurđević 6', 82' (pen.) | | | Stadium: Toumba Stadium; Attendance: 2,615; Referee: Mintiouris |

| 14 November 1992 9 | Apollon Athens | 2–1 | PAOK | Athens |
| | Th.Karasavvidis 26'; Velentzas 67' | | Đurđević 57' | Stadium: Rizoupoli Stadium |

| 22 November 1992 10 | PAOK | 3–1 | Korinthos | Thessaloniki |
| | Đurđević 3', 12' (pen.); Anastasiadis 43' | | Madonis 60' | Stadium: Toumba Stadium; Attendance: 1,177; Referee: Xythalis |

| 29 November 1992 11 | AEK Athens | 3–1 | PAOK | Athens |
| | Dimitriadis 1' (pen.), 25', 41'; Karagiannis (red card) 68' | | Dermitzakis 63'; Plitsis (red card) 78' | Stadium: Nikos Goumas Stadium; Attendance: 19,220; Referee: Plevritis |

| 5 December 1992 12 | PAOK | 0–1 | Iraklis | Thessaloniki |
| | Đurđević (red card) 73' | | Toutziaris 64' | Stadium: Toumba Stadium; Attendance: 2,761; Referee: Skandalos |

| 12 December 1992 13 | Edessaikos | 3–1 | PAOK | Edessa |
| | Tsoleridis 59' (pen.); Papadopoulos 68'; Hamřík (red card) 70'; Zouboulis 85' | | Tolba 27' | Stadium: Municipal Stadium of Edessa; Referee: Arnakis |

| 20 December 1992 14 | PAOK | 0–0 | Olympiacos | Thessaloniki |
| | | | Vlachos (red card) 72' | Stadium: Toumba Stadium; Attendance: 7,988; Referee: Savvas |

| 23 December 1992 15 | Aris | 1–2 | PAOK | Thessaloniki |
| | Lekbello (red card) 55'; Gioukoudis 86' (pen.) | | Lagonidis 12' (pen.); Kapetanopoulos (red card) 47'; Borbokis 59' | Stadium: Kleanthis Vikelidis Stadium; Attendance: 4,145; Referee: Xythalis |

| 3 January 1993 16 | Athinaikos | 1–0 | PAOK | Athens |
| | Ch.Dimopoulos 56'; Papadopoulos (red card) 60' | | | Stadium: Vyronas National Stadium; Attendance: 1,106; Referee: Symiakos |

| 10 January 1993 17 | PAOK | 5–0 | Doxa Drama | Thessaloniki |
| | Kapetanopoulos 16'; Zagorakis 21'; Lagonidis 55'; Th.Dimopoulos 60'; Anastasiadis 87' | | | Stadium: Toumba Stadium |

| 16 January 1993 18 | Panachaiki | 0–0 | PAOK | Patras |
| | | | | Stadium: Kostas Davourlis Stadium; Attendance: 1,175; Referee: Plevritis |

| 24 January 1993 19 | PAOK | 1–2 | OFI | Thessaloniki |
| | Lagonidis 25' | | Machlas 64'; Georgamlis 84' | Stadium: Toumba Stadium; Attendance: 4,711 |

| 30 January 1993 20 | Pierikos | 1–2 | PAOK | Katerini |
| | Konstantinidis 76' | | Deligiannis 7' (o.g.); Plitsis 68' | Stadium: Katerini Stadium; Attendance: 820; Referee: Skandalos |

| 7 February 1993 21 | PAOK | 1–1 | AEL | Thessaloniki |
| | Tolba (penalty missed) 24'; Lagonidis 32' (pen.) | | Stoica 14' | Stadium: Toumba Stadium; Attendance: 2,537; Referee: Kanoulis |

| 21 February 1993 22 | Xanthi | 2–3 | PAOK | Xanthi |
| | Karageorgiou 48'; Marcelo 85' | | Alexiou 74'; Toursounidis 77', 80' | Stadium: Xanthi Ground; Attendance: 4,225; Referee: Naziris |

| 28 February 1993 23 | PAOK | 4–1 | Ionikos | Thessaloniki |
| | Lagonidis 47' (pen.); Alexiou 61'; Đurđević 84', 87' | | Anastopoulos 17' | Stadium: Toumba Stadium; Attendance: 973; Referee: Chatzistavridis |

| 7 March 1993 24 | Panathinaikos | 5–0 | PAOK | Athens |
| | Frantzeskos 15'; Warzycha 19', 31', 65'; Kapouranis 30' | | | Stadium: Athens Olympic Stadium; Attendance: 17,903; Referee: Zakestidis |

| 14 March 1993 25 | Apollon Kalamaria | 0–0 | PAOK | Thessaloniki |
| | | | | Stadium: Kalamaria Stadium; Attendance: 2,105; Referee: Savvas |

| 21 March 1993 26 | PAOK | 2–0 | Apollon Athens | Thessaloniki |
| | Alexiou 37'; Oikonomidis 61' | | | Stadium: Toumba Stadium; Attendance: 1,555; Referee: Lefakis |

| 3 April 1993 27 | Korinthos | 1–2 | PAOK | Argos |
| | Papanikolaou 59'; Lupu (red card) 83' | | Dermitzakis 36'; Oikonomidis 69' | Stadium: Argos Municipal Stadium; Attendance: 1,022; Referee: Mavinis |

| 10 April 1993 28 | PAOK | 2–1 | AEK | Thessaloniki |
| | Lagonidis 54', 77' | | Alexandris 52' | Stadium: Toumba Stadium; Attendance: 9,267; Referee: Savvas |

| 25 April 1993 29 | Iraklis | 1–0 | PAOK | Thessaloniki |
| | Skartados 43' (pen.) | | | Stadium: Kaftanzoglio Stadium; Attendance: 7,021; Referee: Lefakis |

| 2 May 1993 30 | PAOK | 3–0 | Edessaikos | Thessaloniki |
| | Anastasiadis 16', 44'; Th.Dimopoulos 25' | | | Stadium: Toumba Stadium; Attendance: 1,804; Referee: Zakestidis |

| 9 May 1993 31 | Olympiacos | 2–0 | PAOK | Piraeus |
| | Protasov 55'; Mavromatis 61' | | | Stadium: Karaiskakis Stadium; Attendance: 11,527 |

| 15 May 1993 32 | PAOK | 2–0 | Aris | Thessaloniki |
| | Plitsis 87'; Th.Dimopoulos 90' | | Tsimbos (red card) 85' | Stadium: Toumba Stadium; Attendance: 1,554; Referee: Papageorgiou |

| 30 May 1993 33 | PAOK | 1–0 | Athinaikos | Thessaloniki |
| | Th.Dimopoulos 26' | | | Stadium: Toumba Stadium; Attendance: 381 |

| 6 June 1993 34 | Doxa Drama | 1–1 | PAOK | Drama |
| | Aleksić (red card) 44'; Iordanidis 73' | | Zagorakis 54'; Chavos (red card) 68' | Stadium: Doxa Drama Stadium; Attendance: 1,173; Referee: Charlavanis |

== Greek Cup ==
=== First round (group stage) ===
| 16 August 1992 | PAOK | 5–0 | Eordaikos | Thessaloniki |
| | Th.Dimopoulos 13', 53'; Alexiou 18'; Oikonomidis 47'; Đurđević 86' | | | Stadium: Toumba Stadium; Attendance: 2,180; Referee: Xythalis |

| 19 August 1992 | Proodeftiki | 0–0 | PAOK | Piraeus |
| | | | | Stadium: Nikaia Municipal Stadium; Referee: Skandalos |

| 23 August 1992 | Pandramaikos | 2–4 | PAOK | Drama |
| | Tentzos 40' (pen.); Yfantidis 77' | | Toursounidis 20'; Borbokis 31'; Đurđević 37'; Iliadis 45' | Stadium: Municipal Stadium of Drama; Referee: Papageorgiou |

=== Second round ===
| 9 December 1992 1st leg | PAOK | 3–3 | Doxa Drama | Thessaloniki |
| | Dermitzakis 22', 58'; Borbokis 36' | | Plitsis 67' (o.g.); Alexandridis 70'; Aleksić 90' | Stadium: Toumba Stadium; Attendance: 555; Referee: Symiakos |

| 16 December 1992 2nd leg | Doxa Drama | 1–1 (4–4 (a) agg.) | PAOK | Drama |
| | Georgiadis 68'; Giaslanis (red card) 72' | | Lagonidis 87' | Stadium: Doxa Drama Stadium |

== UEFA Cup ==
=== First round ===
| 16 September 1992 1st leg | Paris Saint-Germain (France) | 2–0 | (Greece) PAOK | Paris, France |
| | Weah 14', 24' | Report | Alexiou (red card) 63' | Stadium: Parc des Princes; Attendance: 20,000; Referee: Brian McGinlay (Scotland) |

| 1 October 1992 2nd leg | PAOK (Greece) | 0–3 (0–5 agg.) | (France) Paris Saint-Germain | Thessaloniki, Greece |
| | | Report | Weah 14'; Sassus 32' | Stadium: Toumba Stadium; Attendance: 30,000; Referee: John Blankenstein (Netherlands) |
Note: Match abandoned after 51 mins due to crowd violence, awarded 0–3 to PSG. PAOK were punished with a two-year ban from all European competitions by the UEFA disciplinary committee. The sentence was later reduced to one year.

== Statistics ==
=== Squad statistics ===
As of June 6, 1993

Appearances denote players in the starting lineup, with the numbers in parentheses denoting appearances as substitute.

| No. | Name | Alpha Ethniki | | Greek Cup | | UEFA Cup | | Total | |
| No. | Name | Apps | Goals | Apps | Goals | Apps | Goals | Apps | Goals |
Goalkeepers
| | (Greece) Vangelis Pourliotopoulos | 21 | 0 | 2 | 0 | 0 | 0 | 23 | 0 |
| | (Croatia) Tonči Gabrić | 12 | 0 | 3 | 0 | 2 | 0 | 17 | 0 |
| | (Greece) Nikolaos Michopoulos | 1 | 0 | 0 | 0 | 0 | 0 | 1 | 0 |
Defenders
| | (Greece) Makis Chavos | 28 | 0 | 5 | 0 | 2 | 0 | 35 | 0 |
| | (Greece) Alexis Alexiou | 28 | 5 | 4 | 1 | 1 | 0 | 33 | 6 |
| | (Greece) Dimitrios Kapetanopoulos | 25 | 1 | 4 | 0 | 0 | 0 | 29 | 1 |
| | (Greece) Nikos Panagiotidis | 19 | 0 | 2 | 0 | 0 | 0 | 21 | 0 |
| | (Greece) Kostas Malioufas | 15 | 0 | 1 | 0 | 2 | 0 | 18 | 0 |
| | (Greece) Kostas Iliadis | 14 | 0 | 3 | 1 | 0 | 0 | 17 | 1 |
| | (Greece) Michalis Leontiadis | 4 | 0 | 2 | 0 | 1 | 0 | 7 | 0 |
| | (Greece) Dimitris Palaskas | 4 | 0 | 0 | 0 | 0 | 0 | 4 | 0 |
| | (Greece) Giannis Papoulidis | 4 | 0 | 0 | 0 | 0 | 0 | 4 | 0 |
Midfielders
| | (Greece) Kostas Lagonidis | 32 | 8 | 3 | 1 | 2 | 0 | 37 | 9 |
| | (Greece) Kostas Oikonomidis | 27 | 2 | 5 | 1 | 2 | 0 | 34 | 3 |
| | (Greece) Nikos Plitsis | 22 | 2 | 2 | 0 | 2 | 0 | 26 | 2 |
| | (Greece) Giorgos Toursounidis | 19 | 4 | 3 | 1 | 2 | 0 | 24 | 5 |
| | (Egypt) Magdy Tolba | 20 | 1 | 1 | 0 | 2 | 0 | 23 | 1 |
| | (Greece) Theodoros Zagorakis | 20 | 2 | 1 | 0 | 0 | 0 | 21 | 2 |
| | (Greece) Christos Chionas | 9 | 2 | 4 | 0 | 2 | 0 | 15 | 2 |
Forwards
| | (Greece) Stefanos Borbokis | 28 | 1 | 5 | 2 | 0 | 0 | 33 | 3 |
| | (Federal Republic of Yugoslavia) Milan Đurđević | 22 | 11 | 4 | 2 | 2 | 0 | 28 | 13 |
| | (Greece) Pavlos Dermitzakis | 21 | 2 | 2 | 2 | 2 | 0 | 25 | 4 |
| | (Australia) John Anastasiadis | 22 | 4 | 1 | 0 | 0 | 0 | 23 | 4 |
| | (Greece) Thanasis Dimopoulos | 17 | 4 | 4 | 2 | 0 | 0 | 21 | 6 |
| | (Greece) Vangelis Kalogeropoulos | 5 | 2 | 3 | 0 | 1 | 0 | 9 | 2 |
| | (Greece) Michalis Gekas | 4 | 0 | 0 | 0 | 0 | 0 | 4 | 0 |
| | (Greece) Vangelis Mylonas | 2 | 0 | 0 | 0 | 0 | 0 | 2 | 0 |

Source: Match reports in competitive matches, RSSSF

=== Goalscorers ===
| Rank | No. | Pos. | Player | Alpha Ethniki | Greek Cup | UEFA Cup | Total |
|---|---|---|---|---|---|---|---|
| 1 | | FW | (Federal Republic of Yugoslavia) Milan Đurđević | 11 | 2 | 0 | 13 |
| 2 | | MF | (Greece) Kostas Lagonidis | 8 | 1 | 0 | 9 |
| 3 | | DF | (Greece) Alexis Alexiou | 5 | 1 | 0 | 6 |
| 3 | | FW | (Greece) Thanasis Dimopoulos | 4 | 2 | 0 | 6 |
| 5 | | MF | (Greece) Giorgos Toursounidis | 4 | 1 | 0 | 5 |
| 6 | | FW | (Australia) John Anastasiadis | 4 | 0 | 0 | 4 |
| 6 | | FW | (Greece) Pavlos Dermitzakis | 2 | 2 | 0 | 4 |
| 8 | | MF | (Greece) Kostas Oikonomidis | 2 | 1 | 0 | 3 |
| 8 | | FW | (Greece) Stefanos Borbokis | 1 | 2 | 0 | 3 |
| 10 | | MF | (Greece) Theodoros Zagorakis | 2 | 0 | 0 | 2 |
| 10 | | MF | (Greece) Nikos Plitsis | 2 | 0 | 0 | 2 |
| 10 | | MF | (Greece) Christos Chionas | 2 | 0 | 0 | 2 |
| 10 | | FW | (Greece) Vangelis Kalogeropoulos | 2 | 0 | 0 | 2 |
| 14 | | DF | (Greece) Dimitrios Kapetanopoulos | 1 | 0 | 0 | 1 |
| 14 | | MF | (Egypt) Magdy Tolba | 1 | 0 | 0 | 1 |
| 14 | | DF | (Greece) Kostas Iliadis | 0 | 1 | 0 | 1 |
| Own goals | | | | 1 | 0 | 0 | 1 |
| TOTALS | | | | 52 | 13 | 0 | 65 |

Source: Match reports in competitive matches, RSSSF
