= Borbokis =

Borbokis is a surname. Notable people with the surname include:

- Stefanos Borbokis (1966–2026), Greek footballer
- Vasilios Borbokis (born 1969), Greek footballer
