= 1993–94 PAOK FC season =

PAOK
1993–94 season
- President: Thomas Voulinos
- Manager: Oleg Blokhin; Stavros Sarafis
- Stadium: Toumba Stadium
- Alpha Ethniki: 5th
- Greek Cup: 3rd round
- Top goalscorer: League: Luhový (15); All: Luhový (18)
- Highest home attendance: 14,690 vs Panathinaikos

The 1993–94 season was PAOK Football Club's 67th in existence and the club's 35th consecutive season in the top flight of Greek football. The team entered the Greek Football Cup in first round.

== Players ==
=== Squad ===
Note: Flags indicate national team as defined under FIFA eligibility rules; some limited exceptions apply. Players may hold more than one non-FIFA nationality.

No.	Pos.	Nation	Player
—	GK	GRE	Nikolaos Michopoulos
—	GK	GRE	Vangelis Pourliotopoulos
—	DF	GRE	Alexis Alexiou (captain)
—	DF	GRE	Kostas Malioufas
—	DF	GRE	Makis Chavos
—	DF	GRE	Dimitrios Kapetanopoulos
—	DF	GRE	Nikos Panagiotidis
—	DF	GRE	Kostas Iliadis
—	DF	GRE	Giannis Voltezos
—	MF	GRE	Kostas Lagonidis
—	MF	GRE	Theodoros Zagorakis

No.	Pos.	Nation	Player
—	MF	GRE	Giorgos Toursounidis
—	MF	GRE	Kostas Oikonomidis
—	MF	GRE	Nikos Plitsis
—	MF	GRE	Giannis Antonas
—	MF	GRE	Vangelis Kalfadopoulos
—	FW	SVK	Milan Luhový
—	FW	AUS	John Anastasiadis
—	FW	GRE	Stefanos Borbokis
—	FW	GRE	Pavlos Dermitzakis
—	FW	GRE	Antonis Gioukoudis
—	FW	GRE	Aris Karasavvidis
—	FW	ROU	Gheorghe Ceaușilă

== Transfers ==
Players transferred in

Transfer Window	Pos.	Name	Club	Fee
Summer	DF	(Greece) Giannis Voltezos	(Greece) Ethnikos Alexandroupoli	?
Summer	MF	(Greece) Giannis Antonas	(Greece) ?	?
Summer	MF	(Greece) Vangelis Kalfadopoulos	(Greece) Poseidon Nea Michaniona	?
Summer	FW	(Greece) Antonis Gioukoudis	(Greece) Aris	?
Summer	FW	(Slovakia) Milan Luhový	(France) AS Saint-Étienne	Free
Winter	FW	(Greece) Aris Karasavvidis	(Greece) Apollon Athens	Free
Winter	FW	(Romania) Gheorghe Ceaușilă	(Romania) Sportul Studențesc	Free

Players transferred out

Transfer Window	Pos.	Name	Club	Fee
Summer	GK	(Croatia) Tonči Gabrić	(Croatia) Pazinka	Free
Summer	GK	(Greece) Apostolos Terzis	(Greece) Naoussa	Free
Summer	DF	(Greece) Giannis Papoulidis		Retired
Summer	DF	(Greece) Dimitris Palaskas	?	Free
Summer	MF	(Egypt) Magdy Tolba	(Bulgaria) Levski Sofia	Free
Summer	FW	(Federal Republic of Yugoslavia) Milan Đurđević	(Greece) Panachaiki	Free
Summer	FW	(Greece) Thanasis Dimopoulos	(Greece) Korinthos	Free
Summer	FW	(Greece) Vangelis Kalogeropoulos	(Greece) Levadiakos	Free
Summer	FW	(Greece) Michalis Gekas	(Greece) Apollon Kalamarias	Free
Summer	FW	(Greece) Dimitris Konstantinidis	?	Free
Summer	FW	(Greece) Vangelis Mylonas	?	Free

== Pre-season ==
Win Draw Loss

21 July 1993 Friendly	Neustadt	0–8	PAOK	Germany
			Luhový 10'; Th.Dimopoulos 40'; Lagonidis 45'; Antonas 47', 65'; Plitsis 68'; Dermitzakis 72'; Chavos 85'

24 July 1993 Friendly	SV St. Georg	0–9	PAOK	Germany
			Plitsis 8'; Luhový 21' (pen.); Malioufas 35'; Borbokis 40'; Anastasiadis 55', 77'; Antonas 63'; Th.Dimopoulos 73', 83'

25 July 1993 Friendly	Wolterdingen	1–11	PAOK	Germany

28 July 1993 Friendly	VfB Stuttgart	2–0	PAOK	Germany
	Buchwald 57'; Walter 87'

31 July 1993 Friendly	SC Freiburg	4–1	PAOK	Germany
	Zeyer 5', 89'; Todt 10', 45'		Th.Dimopoulos 47'

2 August 1993 Friendly	FC Nöttingen	1–2	PAOK	Germany
	Walter 54'		Borbokis 40'; Antonas 80'

5 August 1993 Friendly	PAOK	2–1	AEL	Thessaloniki
	Lagonidis 59' (pen.); Antonas 68'		Maggos 15'	Stadium: Toumba Stadium; Referee: Zakestidis

9 August 1993 Friendly	AEL	1–2	PAOK	Larissa
	Zachos 55'		Antonas 77'; Th.Dimopoulos 90'	Stadium: Alcazar Stadium

12 August 1993 Friendly	PAOK	1–2	Aris	Thessaloniki
	Anastasiadis 47'		Lončar 35'; Samolis 79'	Stadium: Toumba Stadium; Referee: Zachariadis

16 August 1993 Friendly	Kavala	0–3	PAOK	Kavala
			Dermitzakis 19', 37'; Borbokis 27'	Stadium: Anthi Karagianni Stadium; Referee: Chatzistavridis

== Competitions ==
=== Overview ===
Competition	Record							
Competition	Pld	W	D	L	GF	GA	GD	Win %
Alpha Ethniki	34	14	9	11	45	38	+7	41.18
Greek Cup	8	3	5	0	12	7	+5	37.50
Total	42	17	14	11	57	45	+12	40.48

Source: Competitions

=== Managerial statistics ===
Head coach	From	To	Record							
Head coach	From	To	G	W	D	L	GF	GA	GD	Win %
(Ukraine) Oleg Blokhin	Start of season	27.02.1994	34	14	13	7	49	36	+13	41.18
(Greece) Stavros Sarafis (Interim)	06.03.1994	End of season	8	3	1	4	8	9	−1	37.50

== Alpha Ethniki ==
=== Standings ===
Pos	Team	Pld	W	D	L	GF	GA	GD	Pts	Qualification or relegation
3	Olympiacos	34	18	14	2	63	27	+36	68	Qualification for UEFA Cup first round
4	Aris	34	18	9	7	55	34	+21	63	Qualification for UEFA Cup preliminary round
5	PAOK	34	14	9	11	45	38	+7	51	
6	Iraklis	34	13	10	11	59	45	+14	49	
7	OFI	34	13	8	13	55	42	+13	47	

Source: RSSSF
Rules for classification: 1st points; 2nd head-to-head points; 3rd head-to-head goal difference; 4th decision match.

==== Results summary ====
Overall								Home						Away					
Pld	W	D	L	GF	GA	GD	Pts	W	D	L	GF	GA	GD	W	D	L	GF	GA	GD
34	14	9	11	45	38	+7	51	13	3	1	35	11	+24	1	6	10	10	27	−17

Last updated: 24 April 1994.
Source: Competitive matches

==== Results by round ====
Round	1	2	3	4	5	6	7	8	9	10	11	12	13	14	15	16	17	18	19	20	21	22	23	24	25	26	27	28	29	30	31	32	33	34
Ground	H	A	H	A	H	A	H	A	H	A	H	A	H	A	H	A	A	H	A	H	A	H	A	H	A	A	H	A	H	A	H	A	H	H
Result	W	L	W	D	D	D	W	L	W	D	W	L	W	D	W	L	D	W	D	D	W	W	L	W	L	L	D	L	W	L	W	L	L	W
Position	2	5	3	5	7	6	5	8	6	7	5	6	5	5	5	6	5	5	5	5	5	5	5	5	5	5	5	6	5	6	5	5	5	5

Source: League matches
A = Away; H = Home; W = Win; D = Draw; L = Loss

• Matches are in chronological order

==== Matches ====
Win Draw Loss

28 August 1993 2	PAOK	4–1	Panachaiki	Thessaloniki
	Luhový 30', 53'; Alexiou 45'; Borbokis 60'		Kyriakopoulos 57'	Stadium: Toumba Stadium; Attendance: 3,933; Referee: Vasilakis

5 September 1993 3	Olympiacos	1–0	PAOK	Piraeus
	Christensen 78'			Stadium: Karaiskakis Stadium; Attendance: 12,237; Referee: Kefalas

12 September 1993 4	PAOK	1–0	Naoussa	Thessaloniki
	Zagorakis 8'			Stadium: Toumba Stadium; Attendance: 4,311; Referee: Bazas

19 September 1993 5	Iraklis	1–1	PAOK	Thessaloniki
	Kostis 36' (pen.)		Borbokis 25'	Stadium: Kaftanzoglio Stadium; Attendance: 7,152; Referee: Kalathenos

25 September 1993 6	PAOK	0–0	AEK Athens	Thessaloniki
				Stadium: Toumba Stadium; Attendance: 11,248; Referee: Dermetzoglou

3 October 1993 7	Panionios	1–1	PAOK	Athens
	Lagonikakis 24'		Lagonidis 83'	Stadium: Grigoris Lambrakis Stadium; Attendance: 2,282
Note: Match held at Kallithea instead of Nea Smyrni

17 October 1993 8	PAOK	6–1	Edessaikos	Thessaloniki
	Oikonomidis 9', 77'; Lagonidis 37' (penalty missed) 47'; Gioukoudis 63'; Luhový 80', 89'		Skara 39' (pen.)	Stadium: Toumba Stadium; Attendance: 2,365; Referee: Fasolis

20 October 1993 1	Athinaikos	4–0	PAOK	Athens
	Alvertis 12', 53'; Bong 47'; Spinoulas 80'			Stadium: Vyronas National Stadium
Note: Match was initially scheduled on 22 August.

24 October 1993 9	PAOK	2–1	Xanthi	Thessaloniki
	Chavos 45'; Anastasiadis 81'		Tzatzos 84'	Stadium: Toumba Stadium; Attendance: 2,356; Referee: Vasilakis

31 October 1993 10	Apollon Kalamaria	1–1	PAOK	Thessaloniki
	Vlachoudis 30'		Luhový 42'	Stadium: Kalamaria Stadium; Attendance: 2,045; Referee: Zachariadis

7 November 1993 11	PAOK	2–1	OFI	Thessaloniki
	Luhový 7'; Chavos 19'; Panagiotidis (red card) 88'		Tsifoutis 48'; Lupu (red card) 88'	Stadium: Toumba Stadium; Attendance: 3,365; Referee: Bazas

21 November 1993 12	Levadiakos	1–0	PAOK	Livadeia
	Bletsas 90'			Stadium: Levadia Municipal Stadium; Attendance: 1,351; Referee: Spathas

28 November 1993 13	PAOK	1–0	Apollon Athens	Thessaloniki
	Lagonidis 64'			Stadium: Toumba Stadium; Attendance: 1,484

5 December 1993 14	AEL	1–1	PAOK	Larissa
	Issa 90'		Karasavvidis 22'	Stadium: Alcazar Stadium; Attendance: 2,983; Referee: Vlachos

11 December 1993 15	PAOK	3–1	Panathinaikos	Thessaloniki
	Chavos 9'; Luhový 17', 82'; Anastasiadis (yellow card) 28' (yellow-red card) 29'		Warzycha 38'	Stadium: Toumba Stadium; Attendance: 6,728; Referee: Charlavanis

18 December 1993 16	Aris	1–0	PAOK	Thessaloniki
	Sapountzis 59' (pen.)			Stadium: Kleanthis Vikelidis Stadium; Attendance: 11,547; Referee: Sakellariou

22 December 1993 17	Doxa Drama	1–1	PAOK	Drama
	Aleksić 61'		Karasavvidis 8'; Panagiotidis (red card) 66'	Stadium: Doxa Drama Stadium; Attendance: 2,002; Referee: Bentas

5 January 1994 18	PAOK	3–0	Athinaikos	Thessaloniki
	Luhový 56'; Dermitzakis 59', 70'			Stadium: Toumba Stadium; Attendance: 837; Referee: Borovilos

9 January 1994 19	Panachaiki	1–1	PAOK	Patras
	Ottiji 34'		Dermitzakis 79'	Stadium: Kostas Davourlis Stadium; Attendance: 393

16 January 1994 20	PAOK	1–1	Olympiacos	Thessaloniki
	Zagorakis 39'		Tsalouchidis 29'	Stadium: Toumba Stadium; Attendance: 10,291; Referee: Charlavanis

23 January 1994 21	Naoussa	0–1	PAOK	Naousa
	Penev (red card) 56'		Alexiou 48'	Stadium: Municipal Stadium of Naousa; Attendance: 1,786; Referee: Bikas

30 January 1994 22	PAOK	2–0	Iraklis	Thessaloniki
	Alexiou 33'; Luhový 90'			Stadium: Toumba Stadium; Attendance: 4,010

6 February 1994 23	AEK Athens	2–0	PAOK	Athens
	Kasapis 44'; Savevski 64'			Stadium: Nikos Goumas Stadium; Attendance: 9,479; Referee: Kalathenos

13 February 1994 24	PAOK	3–2	Panionios	Thessaloniki
	Luhový 6'; Toursounidis 25' (pen.); Ceaușilă 61'		Mirtsekis 3'; Nalitzis 72'	Stadium: Toumba Stadium; Attendance: 551; Referee: Kalathenos

20 February 1994 25	Edessaikos	1–0	PAOK	Edessa
	Skara 44' (pen.)			Stadium: Municipal Stadium of Edessa; Attendance: 2,343; Referee: Dermetzoglou

27 February 1994 26	Xanthi	5–2	PAOK	Xanthi
	Tengelidis 14'; Pano 18' (pen.); Marcelo 56', 68'; Karageorgiou 89'		Pourliotopoulos (red card) 18'; Luhový 61'; Chavos 78'	Stadium: Xanthi Ground; Attendance: 2,607; Referee: Spaneas

6 March 1994 27	PAOK	1–1	Apollon Kalamaria	Thessaloniki
	Luhový 3'		Nolis 8'	Stadium: Toumba Stadium; Attendance: 1,222; Referee: Mazarakis

12 March 1994 28	OFI	1–0	PAOK	Heraklion
	Machlas 70'			Stadium: Theodoros Vardinogiannis Stadium; Attendance: 965

20 March 1994 29	PAOK	2–0	Levadiakos	Thessaloniki
	Borbokis 8'; Alexiou 69'			Stadium: Toumba Stadium; Attendance: 543; Referee: Spathas

26 March 1994 30	Apollon Athens	3–1	PAOK	Athens
	Nikolaidis 22'; Kovačević 54'; Platinakis 58'		Dermitzakis 90' (pen.)	Stadium: Rizoupoli Stadium; Attendance: 564

3 April 1994 31	PAOK	2–0	AEL	Thessaloniki
	Dermitzakis 45'; Gioukoudis 83'		Milos (red card) 83'	Stadium: Toumba Stadium; Attendance: 1,274; Referee: Nikakis

9 April 1994 32	Panathinaikos	2–0	PAOK	Athens
	Warzycha 6' (pen.), 79' (pen.)			Stadium: Athens Olympic Stadium; Attendance: 4,593; Referee: Mazarakis

17 April 1994 33	PAOK	1–2	Aris	Thessaloniki
	Luhový 33' (pen.)		Dalkidis (penalty missed) 28'; Milojević 28'; Sapountzis 65'	Stadium: Toumba Stadium; Attendance: 6,061; Referee: Savvas

24 April 1994 34	PAOK	1–0	Doxa Drama	Thessaloniki
	Luhový 15'		Leković (red card) 85'	Stadium: Toumba Stadium; Attendance: 734; Referee: Giannopoulos

== Greek Cup ==
=== First round (group stage) ===
25 August 1993	PAOK	4–1	Proodeftiki	Thessaloniki
	Dermitzakis 5'; Zagorakis 27'; Lagonidis 65' (pen.); Anastasiadis 70'		Vogiatzis 56' (pen.)	Stadium: Toumba Stadium; Attendance: 375; Referee: Kamasis

8 September 1993	AO Velissario	1–1	PAOK	Ioannina
	Tahiri 61'		Luhový 27'	Stadium: Zosimades Stadium; Referee: Spaneas

22 September 1993	PAOK	1–0	Atromitos	Thessaloniki
	Alexiou (penalty missed) 76'; Chavos 76'			Stadium: Toumba Stadium; Attendance: 323; Referee: Bikas

6 October 1993	Ethnikos Alexandroupoli	1–1	PAOK	Alexandroupoli
	Nikolaidis 65'		Antonas 88'	Stadium: Fotis Kosmas Stadium

=== Second round ===
27 October 1993 1st leg	PAOK	1–0	Apollon Athens	Thessaloniki
	Lagonidis 55'			Stadium: Toumba Stadium; Attendance: 721; Referee: Bentas

10 November 1993 2nd leg	Apollon Athens	4–4 (4–5 agg.)	PAOK	Athens
	Lagonidis 45+2' (o.g.); Karasavvidis 64' (pen.), 86' (pen.); Shehu 82'		Luhový 45', 48'; Kapetanopoulos 60'; Gioukoudis 77'	Stadium: Rizoupoli Stadium; Attendance: 957; Referee: Ntoutsias

=== Third round ===
15 December 1993 1st leg	Panathinaikos	0–0	PAOK	Athens
				Stadium: Athens Olympic Stadium; Attendance: 3,532; Referee: Bentas

29 December 1993 2nd leg	PAOK	0–0 (a.e.t.) (0–0 agg.) (4–5 p)	Panathinaikos	Thessaloniki
				Stadium: Toumba Stadium; Attendance: 14,690; Referee: Bazas
	Penalties
	Alexiou (penalty missed); Luhový (penalty scored); Lagonidis (penalty scored); Karasavvidis (penalty scored); Toursounidis (penalty scored)		(penalty scored) Warzycha; (penalty scored) Christodoulou; (penalty scored) Frantzeskos; (penalty scored) Saravakos; (penalty scored) Apostolakis

== Statistics ==
=== Squad statistics ===
As of April 24, 1994

Appearances denote players in the starting lineup, with the numbers in parentheses denoting appearances as substitute.

No.	Name	Alpha Ethniki		Greek Cup		Total	
No.	Name	Apps	Goals	Apps	Goals	Apps	Goals
Goalkeepers
	(Greece) Nikolaos Michopoulos	21	0	7	0	28	0
	(Greece) Vangelis Pourliotopoulos	13	0	1	0	14	0
Defenders
	(Greece) Alexis Alexiou	33	4	5	0	38	4
	(Greece) Makis Chavos	30	4	7	1	37	5
	(Greece) Dimitrios Kapetanopoulos	29	0	6	1	35	1
	(Greece) Nikos Panagiotidis	28	0	1	0	29	0
	(Greece) Kostas Malioufas	18	0	5	0	23	0
	(Greece) Giannis Voltezos	10	0	4	0	14	0
	(Greece) Kostas Iliadis	6	0	5	0	11	0
Midfielders
	(Greece) Kostas Oikonomidis	32	2	5	0	37	2
	(Greece) Theodoros Zagorakis	30	2	5	1	35	3
	(Greece) Kostas Lagonidis	24	3	5	2	29	5
	(Greece) Giorgos Toursounidis	12	1	4	0	16	1
	(Greece) Giannis Antonas	7	0	4	1	11	1
	(Greece) Nikos Plitsis	2	0	3	0	5	0
	(Greece) Vangelis Kalfadopoulos	0	0	3	0	3	0
Forwards
	(Greece) Antonis Gioukoudis	30	2	8	1	38	3
	(Slovakia) Milan Luhový	28	15	7	3	35	18
	(Australia) John Anastasiadis	28	1	7	1	35	2
	(Greece) Stefanos Borbokis	18	3	6	0	24	3
	(Greece) Pavlos Dermitzakis	17	5	2	1	19	6
	(Greece) Aris Karasavvidis	17	2	2	0	19	2
	(Romania) Gheorghe Ceaușilă	8	1	1	0	9	1

Source: Match reports in competitive matches, RSSSF

=== Goalscorers ===
Rank	No.	Pos.	Player	Alpha Ethniki	Greek Cup	Total
1		FW	(Slovakia) Milan Luhový	15	3	18
2		FW	(Greece) Pavlos Dermitzakis	5	1	6
3		DF	(Greece) Makis Chavos	4	1	5
3		MF	(Greece) Kostas Lagonidis	3	2	5
5		DF	(Greece) Alexis Alexiou	4	0	4
6		FW	(Greece) Stefanos Borbokis	3	0	3
6		MF	(Greece) Theodoros Zagorakis	2	1	3
6		FW	(Greece) Antonis Gioukoudis	2	1	3
9		MF	(Greece) Kostas Oikonomidis	2	0	2
9		FW	(Greece) Aris Karasavvidis	2	0	2
9		FW	(Australia) John Anastasiadis	1	1	2
12		MF	(Greece) Giorgos Toursounidis	1	0	0
12		FW	(Romania) Gheorghe Ceaușilă	1	0	1
12		DF	(Greece) Dimitrios Kapetanopoulos	0	1	1
12		MF	(Greece) Giannis Antonas	0	1	1
TOTALS				45	12	57

Source: Match reports in competitive matches, RSSSF
