= Kostas Lagonidis =

Greek footballer and manager

Personal information
- Full name: Konstantinos Lagonidis
- Date of birth: 1 July 1965 (age 61)
- Place of birth: Altena, West Germany
- Height: 1.78 m (5 ft 10 in)
- Position: Central midfielder

Team information
- Current team: PAOK (scout)

Senior career*
Years	Team	Apps	(Gls)
1985–1987	Xanthi		
1987–1995	PAOK	227	(38)
1995–1997	Iraklis	41	(1)
1997–1998	Apollon Kalamarias	11	(0)
1998–1999	PAOK	1	(0)

International career
1988–1991	Greece	4	(1)

Managerial career
- 2002–2004: PAOK (assistant)
- 2008: AE Polykastro
- * Club domestic league appearances and goals

Kostas Lagonidis (Greek: Κώστας Λαγωνίδης; born 1 July 1965) is a Greek former international footballer and current football official, best known for his long-standing career as a midfielder for PAOK.

== Career ==
=== Club career ===
Lagonidis began his football career at Xanthi. In 1987, he joined PAOK and recorded with the Double-headed eagle of the North a total of 287 appearances in all competitions scoring 45 goals (228 apps and 38 goals in the league). In December 1995, his contract was not renewed by the then PAOK president Thomas Voulinos and he moved to Iraklis where he played for one-and-a-half season. In 1997, he had a brief spell at Apollon Kalamarias and ended his career at PAOK in 1999.

=== International career ===
Lagonidis had 4 caps and scored 1 goal for the Greece national team, between 1988 and 1991.

=== Post-playing career ===
After retiring from professional football, Lagonidis transitioned into management and administrative roles. He was the assistant manager of Angelos Anastasiadis when PAOK won the 2003 Greek Cup and has worked in various administrative positions within the PAOK Academy.

== Career statistics ==
=== Club career ===
Appearances and goals by club, season and competition
Club	Season	League			Cup		Continental		Total	
Club	Season	Division	Apps	Goals	Apps	Goals	Apps	Goals	Apps	Goals
Xanthi	1985–86	Gamma Ethniki					–			
Xanthi	1986–87	Beta Ethniki					–			
Xanthi	Total						–			
PAOK	1987–88	Alpha Ethniki	16	4	2	0	–		18	4
PAOK	1988–89	Alpha Ethniki	23	2	7	1	2	0	32	3
PAOK	1989–90	Alpha Ethniki	33	4	5	1	–		39 (Note: Lagonidis had 1 additional appearance that season in the Greek League Cup.)	5
PAOK	1990–91	Alpha Ethniki	29	2	11	1	2	0	42	3
PAOK	1991–92	Alpha Ethniki	28	6	10	1	3	0	41	7
PAOK	1992–93	Alpha Ethniki	32	8	3	1	2	0	37	9
PAOK	1993–94	Alpha Ethniki	24	3	5	2	–		29	5
PAOK	1994–95	Alpha Ethniki	31	6	3	0	–		34	6
PAOK	1995–96 (i)	Alpha Ethniki	11	3	3	0	–		14	3
PAOK	Total		227	38	49	7	9	0	286	45
Iraklis	1995–96 (ii)	Alpha Ethniki	15	1	1	0	–		16	1
Iraklis	1996–97	Alpha Ethniki	26	0		0	2	0		0
Iraklis	Total		41	1		0	2	0		1
Apollon Kalamarias	1997–98	Beta Ethniki	11	0			–			
PAOK	1998–99	Alpha Ethniki	1	0	0	0	0	0	1	0
Career total (Alpha Ethniki)			269	39			11	0		

Source: RSSSF

=== International career ===
National team	Year	Caps	Goals
Greece
Greece	1988	1	1
Greece	1989	2	0
Greece	1991	1	0
Total		4	1

International goal scored by Kostas Lagonidis
No.	Date	Venue	Opponent	Score	Result	Competition
1	15 November 1988	Karaiskakis Stadium, Piraeus	Hungary	1–0	3–0	Friendly
