= Konstantinos Malioufas =

Greek footballer

Kostas Malioufas
Personal information
- Full name: Konstantinos Malioufas
- Date of birth: 1 September 1963 (age 63)
- Place of birth: Drosero, Pella, Greece
- Position: Centre back

Team information
- Current team: PAOK (scout)

Youth career
- 1978–1980: Atromitos Lakkas
- 1980–1983: Aris Palefytou

Senior career*
Years	Team	Apps	(Gls)
1983–1995	PAOK	198	(5)
1995–1996	Trikala		
1996–2000	Naoussa		

Managerial career
- 2000: Naoussa (caretaker)
- * Club domestic league appearances and goals

Konstantinos Malioufas (Greek: Κωνσταντίνος Μαλιούφας; born 1 September 1963) is a Greek former professional footballer and current football official, best known for his long-standing career as a central defender for PAOK.

== Career ==
Malioufas started his football journey in the regional leagues of Pella, playing for local clubs Atromitos Lakkas and Aris Palefytou, before making his big move to PAOK in 1983. He spent 12 consecutive seasons with the Thessaloniki club, registering 262 official appearances across all competitions and winning the 1985 Greek league title. After leaving PAOK in 1995, he played for Trikala for one year and concluded his playing career at Naoussa, retiring in 2000. Following his retirement, Malioufas dedicated himself to youth development, serving as the head coach of PAOK's U20 youth team from 2003 to 2005 and working extensively within the club's youth academy system. Today, he remains a vital member of the PAOK Academy, operating as a scout and managing the club's affiliate academy network across Greece.

== Career statistics ==
=== Club career ===
Club	Season	Greek League		Greek Cup		Continental		Total	
Club	Season	Apps	Goals	Apps	Goals	Apps	Goals	Apps	Goals
PAOK	1983–84	7	1	6	5	1	0	14	6
PAOK	1984–85	4	0	4	0	–		8	0
PAOK	1985–86	9	0	1	0	0	0	10	0
PAOK	1986–87	24	1	3	0	–		27	1
PAOK	1987–88	20	1	2	0	–		22	1
PAOK	1988–89	23	0	7	0	2	0	32	0
PAOK	1989–90	31	1	8	0	–		40 (Note: Malioufas had 1 additional appearance that season in the Greek League Cup.)	1
PAOK	1990–91	19	0	6	0	1	0	26	0
PAOK	1991–92	24	1	11	0	3	0	38	1
PAOK	1992–93	15	0	1	0	2	0	18	0
PAOK	1993–94	18	0	5	0	–		23	0
PAOK	1994–95	2	0	2	0	–		4	0
Career total		198	5	56	5	9	0	262	10

Source: RSSSF

== Honours ==
PAOK

- Alpha Ethniki: 1984–85
