= Imre Katzenbach =

Hungarian footballer (1964–2009)

Personal information
- Date of birth: 20 September 1964
- Place of birth: Hungary
- Date of death: 28 September 2009 (aged 45)
- Place of death: Hungary

Senior career*
Years	Team	Apps	(Gls)
1982–1989	MTK Budapest	155	(10)
1990–1994	Apollon Athens	115	(23)
1994–1996	Olympiacos Volos		
1996	MTK Budapest	10	(1)
1997	III. Kerületi TVE	7	(1)
1997–1998	Szegedi EAC	3	(0)
- * Club domestic league appearances and goals

Imre Katzenbach (20 September 1964 – 28 September 2009) was a Hungarian footballer who played as a midfielder.

== Early life ==
Katzenbach started his career with Hungarian side MTK Budapest. He debuted for the club at the age of nineteen.

== Career ==
In 1990, Katzenbach signed for Greek side Apollon Smyrnis FC. He helped the club achieve fifth place in the league.

== Style of play ==
Katzenbach mainly operated as a midfielder. He was described as "combined goals with spectacle, while he was a "maître" in foul executions".

== Death ==
Katzenbach disappeared from his home in Budapest on 28 September 2009. In 2019, the police learned that he had been murdered. His body was found in the Baranyajenő area at the end of 2020. He was laid to rest in Soltvadkert on 12 March 2021. The suspects were arrested that same year, one of whom is the brother of the well-known rapper Curtis.
