= Fanis Toutziaris =

Greek footballer

Personal information
- Full name: Theofanis Toutziaris
- Date of birth: 8 January 1965 (age 61)
- Place of birth: Thessaloniki, Greece
- Position: Striker

Senior career*
Years	Team	Apps	(Gls)
–1984	Odysseas Kordelio		
1984–1987	Makedonikos		
1987–1995	Iraklis	238	(62)
1995–1997	Aris	40	(11)
1997	Apollon Kalamarias	9	(3)

International career^{‡}
1989–1994	Greece	4	(1)
- * Club domestic league appearances and goals as of 13 September 2013 ‡ National team caps and goals as of 13 September 2013

Theofanis "Fanis" Toutziaris (Greek: Θεοφάνης "Φάνης" Τουτζιάρης; born 8 January 1965) is a former Greek international footballer that played as a striker for Makedonikos, Iraklis and Aris and Apollon Kalamarias.

== Club career ==
Toutziaris signed for Iraklis in January 1987 from Makedonikos. In the 1993–94 season he was Iraklis' topscorer with 20 goals out of 33 appearances. In a timespan of 8 years he played 238 league games for Iraklis and scored 62 goals. In January 1995 he left Iraklis for Aris. He stayed with Aris for two years appearing in no less than 40 occasions and scoring 11 goals. He finished his career with Apollon Kalamarias in the second half of the 1996–97 season appearing in 9 matches and scoring 3 goals.

== International career ==
Toutziaris made his debut for Greece in a friendly loss against Turkey on 29 March 1989. Totally he earned 4 caps for Greece and scored once.
