= Giannis Alexoulis =

Greek footballer

Personal information
- Full name: Ioannis Alexoulis
- Date of birth: 22 April 1964 (age 62)
- Position: Midfielder

Youth career
- 1978–1982: Olosson FC

Senior career*
Years	Team	Apps	(Gls)
1982–1989	AEL	125	(14)
1989–1991	PAOK	56	(2)
1991–1995	AEL	68	(3)
1995–1996	Ialysos		

Managerial career
- 2000–2001: AEL
- 2007–2008: Tyrnavos 2005
- 2009: Pyrgetos
- 2010: PO Elassona
- 2010–2011: AEL (scout)
- 2012–2013: Pyrgetos
- 2013–2014: PAOL Averof
- 2014: AEL (team manager)
- 2015–2016: Dotieas Agia
- 2016: Aetos Amygdaleas
- 2017–2018: Ampeloniakos
- * Club domestic league appearances and goals

Giannis Alexoulis (Greek: Γιάννης Αλεξούλης; born 22 April 1964) is a former Greek football player.

== Career ==
He joined AEL in 1982 from youth team, and stayed with the team until 1989, at which time he transferred to PAOK. He played with PAOK until 1992, when he returned to AEL, He joined Ialysos the last club in his professional career, in 1996.

== Personal ==
His daughter is the long jumper Haido Alexouli.

== Honours ==
AEL

- Alpha Ethniki: 1987–88
- Greek Cup: 1984–85
