= Giannis Gitsioudis =

Greek footballer

Personal information
- Full name: Ioannis Gitsioudis
- Date of birth: 17 March 1962 (age 64)
- Place of birth: Greece
- Position: Goalkeeper

Senior career*
| Years | Team | Apps | (Gls) |
| 1981–1985 | Iraklis | 78 | (0) |
| 1985–1992 | PAOK | 129 | (0) |

International career
| 1988–1989 | Greece | 5 | (0) |
- * Club domestic league appearances and goals

Giannis Gitsioudis (Greek: Γιάννης Γκιτσιούδης; born 17 March 1962) is a former Greek footballer who played as a goalkeeper.

== Career ==
Gitsioudis joined Iraklis in July 1981, and played four seasons for the club in the Alpha Ethniki, before joining PAOK in July 1985. He played the next seven seasons for PAOK in the Alpha Ethniki.

Gitsioudis made five appearances for the Greece national football team from 1988 to 1989.
