= Magdy Tolba =

Egyptian footballer (born 1964)

Personal information
- Date of birth: 24 February 1964 (age 62)
- Place of birth: Egypt
- Position: Midfielder

Senior career*
Years	Team	Apps	(Gls)
1983–1989	Zamalek	40	(4)
1989–1994	PAOK	86	(12)
1994	Levski Sofia	5	(0)
1994–1995	Anorthosis Famagusta	29	(5)
1995–1998	Al-Ahly	46	(2)
1998–1999	Ismaily	3	(0)
Total		209	(23)

International career
1987–1997	Egypt	35	(1)
- * Club domestic league appearances and goals

Magdy Tolba (Arabic: مجدي طلبه) (born 24 February 1964) is an Egyptian former professional footballer who played as a midfielder. Tolba spent most of his playing career with Zamalek Sporting Club. He also had a spell with PAOK in the Super League Greece. Tolba was the first Egyptian to play in the Bulgarian A PFG.

Tolba made several appearances for the Egypt national team, including participating in the 1990 FIFA World Cup finals.

== Honours ==
7 for Zamalek

2 Egyptian Leagues
1 Egypt Cup
1 Egyptian Friendship Cup
2 African Champions League
1 Afro-Asian Cup

2 for Levski Sofia

1 Bulgarian League
1 Bulgarian Cup

1 for Anorthosis Famagusta

1 Cypriot First Division

7 for Al-Ahly

3 Egyptian Leagues
1 Egypt Cup
1 Arab Champions League
2 Arab Super Cups
