= Stefanos Borbokis =

Greek footballer (1966–2026)

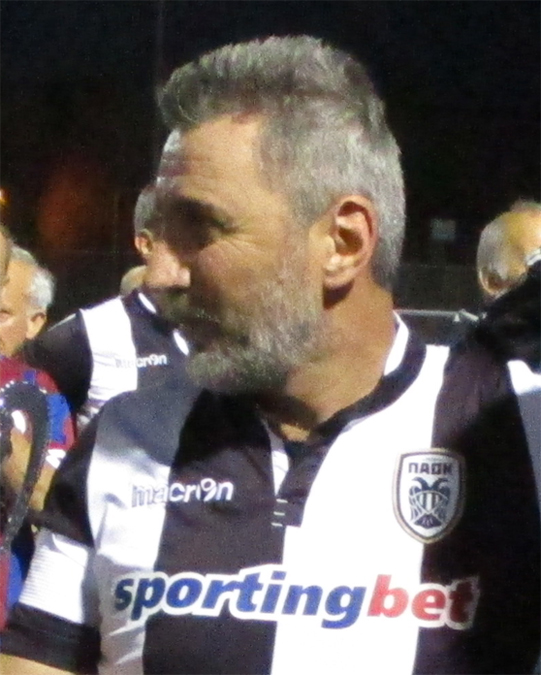
- Borbokis in 2017

Personal information
- Date of birth: 1 September 1966
- Place of birth: Serres, Greece
- Date of death: 11 April 2026 (aged 59)
- Height: 1.75 m (5 ft 9 in)
- Positions: Forward; winger

Senior career*
Years	Team	Apps	(Gls)
1986–1994	PAOK	215	(31)
1994–1995	Edessaikos	28	(10)
1995–1997	Iraklis	60	(10)
1997–1998	Aris	28	(2)
1998–2001	Apollon Kalamarias	48	(8)
Total		378	(61)

International career
- Greece U21
1988–1992	Greece	29	(6)

Managerial career
- 2008: Enosi Thraki
- 2008–2009: Thermaikos
- 2009–2010: Anagennisi Giannitsa
Medal record
Men's football
Representing Greece
UEFA European Under-21 Championship
Runner-up	1988
- * Club domestic league appearances and goals

Stefanos Borbokis (Greek: Στέφανος Μπορμπόκης; 1 September 1966 – 11 April 2026) was a Greek footballer who played as a forward and winger. He was the brother of Vasilios Borbokis who also played for PAOK.

== Club career ==
Borbokis began his career at PAOK in 1986 and became an influential part of the team playing 215 Alpha Ethniki games and scoring 31 goals. The 1987–88 season was by far his best season scoring 10 goals helping PAOK finish third. That season he scored a goal in a 3–1 win against arch city rivals Aris, another goal in a 4–1 win against Panathinaikos and a double in a 6–1 win against Olympiacos (PAOK's biggest ever victory against the reds). The following 1988–89 season he scored a historic winner in PAOK's only ever win against Olympiakos (1–0) at the Athens Olympic Stadium. He also debuted in the UEFA Cup that season against Diego Maradona's Napoli, losing 2–1 on aggregate to the eventual 1988–89 UEFA Cup champions. In the 1991–92 UEFA Cup Borbokis scored the winner against K.V. Mechelen away in Belgium to progress 2–1 on aggregate to the second round. Borbokis also took part in the 1992 Greek Cup final in which PAOK lost to Olympiacos over two legs 3–1.

In 1994, he transferred to Edessaikos where he played one season, helping Edessaikos reach the final four in the Greek Cup. He later returned to Thessaloniki and played for Iraklis, Aris and Apollon Kalamarias.

He is the only player to have ever played for all four major clubs of Thessaloniki.

== International career ==
Borbokis earned his first cap with Greece as a 24th min substitute in a friendly against Northern Ireland on 17 February 1988, which Greece won 3–2. He is PAOK's ninth most capped Greek international having played 29 times. In the 1992 Euro Qualifiers he was Greece's top goal scorer with a tally of 3.

== Personal life and death ==
Borbokis hailed from Mitrousi, Serres. He died on 11 April 2026, at the age of 59, after serious health problems.

== Career statistics ==
Scores and results list Greece's goal tally first, score column indicates score after each Borbokis goal.

List of international goals scored by Stefanos Borbokis
No.	Date	Venue	Opponent	Score	Result	Competition
1	25 January 1989	Olympic Stadium, Athens, Greece	Portugal	1–1	1–2	Friendly match
2	25 October 1989	Ferenc Puskás Stadium, Budapest, Hungary	Hungary	1–1	1–1	Friendly match
3	31 October 1990	Olympic Stadium, Athens, Greece	Malta	4–0	4–0	UEFA Euro 1992 qualifying
4	23 January 1991	Olympic Stadium, Athens, Greece	Portugal	1–0	3–2	UEFA Euro 1992 qualifying
5	17 April 1991	Nikos Goumas Stadium, Athens, Greece	Sweden	2–2	2–2	Friendly match
6	30 October 1991	Olympic Stadium, Athens, Greece	Finland	2–0	2–0	UEFA Euro 1992 qualifying

== Honours ==
Greece U21

- UEFA European Under-21 Championship runner-up: 1988
