= 1982 Greek Football Cup final =

1982 Greek Cup final
- Event: 1981–82 Greek Football Cup
| Panathinaikos | AEL |
| 1 | 0 |
- Date: 19 June 1982
- Venue: AEK Stadium, Nea Filadelfia, Athens
- Referee: Antonis Vassaras (Thessaloniki)
- Attendance: 22,560

The 1982 Greek Cup final was the 38th final of the Greek Cup. The match took place on 19 June 1982 at Nikos Goumas Stadium. The contesting teams were Panathinaikos and AEL. It was Panathinaikos' fourteenth Greek Cup final in their 74 years of existence and AEL's first ever Greek Cup final in their 18-year history. Despite Panathinaikos winning the match, they were not awarded the Cup, but a commemorative trophy instead, since the objection of Olympiacos against them for the case of illegal Hellenisation of Juan Ramón Rocha was still pending. The normal ceremony took place 2 months later, while the case had been finalized.

== Venue ==
This was the seventh Greek Cup final held at AEK Stadium, after the 1962, 1967, 1974, 1976, 1980 and 1981 finals.

AEK Stadium was built in 1930 and it has been renovated in 1979. The stadium is used as a venue for AEK Athens and was used for Greece on various occasions. Its current capacity is 35,000.

== Background ==
Panathinaikos had reached the Greek Cup final thirteen times, winning six of them. The last time that they played in a final was in 1977, where they had won against PAOK by 2–1.

AEL had never competed in a Cup final.

The two teams had never met each other in a Cup final.

== Route to the final ==
| Panathinaikos | | | | Round | AEL | | | |
|---|---|---|---|---|---|---|---|---|
| Opponent | Agg. | 1st leg | 2nd leg | | Opponent | Agg. | 1st leg | 2nd leg |
| Ilisiakos | 2–0 (A) | | | First round | Olympiacos Volos | 2–0 (H) | | |
| Olympiacos | 3–2 (a.e.t.) (H) | | | Second round | Xanthi | 1–0 (H) | | |
| Iraklis | 3–2 | 0–1 (A) | 3–1 (a.e.t.) (H) | Round of 16 | Ethnikos Piraeus | 1–0 | 1–0 (A) | 0–0 (H) |
| Kastoria | 3–1 | 0–1 (A) | 3–0 (H) | Quarter-finals | Diagoras | 1–0 | 1–0 (H) | 0–0 (A) |
| PAOK | 2–1 | 0–1 (A) | 2–0 (H) | Semi-finals | Korinthos | 3–2 | 0–1 (A) | 3–1 (H) |

== Match ==
=== Details ===
19 June 1982
21:00 EEST

| Panathinaikos | 1–0 | AEL |
|---|---|---|
| Charalampidis 49' | Report |

AEK Stadium, Nea Filadelfia
Attendance: 22,560
Referee: Antonis Vassaras (Thessaloniki)

| Panathinaikos | AEL |

| GK | (Greece) Vasilis Konstantinou (c) |
| DF | (Greece) Giannis Kyrastas |
| DF | (Greece) Theofilos Simeoforidis |
| DF | (Turkey) Nikos Kovis |
| DF | (Greece) Anthimos Kapsis |
| MF | (Greece) Spyros Livathinos |
| MF | (Romania) Doru Nicolae |
| MF | (Greece) Ermis Kouropoulos | (substituted off) 78' |
| FW | (Greece) Grigoris Charalampidis | (substituted off) 88' |
| FW | (Norway) Arne Dokken |
| FW | (Greece) Maik Galakos |
Substitutes:
| GK | (Greece) Eleftherios Poupakis |
| MF | (Greece) Pantelis Katsiakos | (substituted on) 78' |
| MF | (Greece) Angelos Anastasiadis | (substituted on) 88' |
Manager:
(Greece) Lakis Petropoulos

| GK | (Greece) Georgios Plitsis |
| DF | (Greece) Takis Parafestas (c) |
| DF | (Greece) Nikos Patsiavouras |
| DF | (Greece) Giannis Galitsios |
| DF | (Greece) Nikos Argyroulis |
| MF | (Greece) Thomas Dramalis | (substituted off) 82' |
| MF | (Greece) Kostas Koutas | (substituted off) 82' |
| MF | (Greece) Giannis Golandas |
| FW | (Greece) Giannis Valaoras |
| FW | (Greece) Christos Andreoudis |
| FW | (Greece) Kostas Maloumidis |
Substitutes:
| GK | (Greece) Theologis Papadopoulos |
| DF | (Greece) Georgios Mitsibonas | (substituted on) 82' |
| MF | (Greece) Theodoros Voutiritsas | (substituted on) 82' |
| MF | (Greece) Thanasis Tsitsilis |
| MF | (Greece) Giannis Gabetas |
Manager:
(Greece) Antonis Georgiadis

Assistant referees:
Giorgos Kounalakis (Heraklion)
Vasilis Tikmoglou (Thessaloniki)

Match rules

- 90 minutes
- 30 minutes of extra time if necessary
- Penalty shootout if scores still level
- Five named substitutes
- Maximum of two substitutions

== See also ==
- 1981–82 Greek Football Cup
