= 1984–85 AE Larissa F.C. season =

AEL
1984–85 season
- Chairman: Kostas Samaras
- Manager: Andrzej Strejlau
- Alpha Ethniki: 6th
- Greek Cup: Winners
- Cup Winners' Cup: Quarter-finals
Home colours	Away colours

In the 1984–85 season, Athlitiki Enosi Larissa F.C. competed in the Greek league, the Greek Cup and in the UEFA Cup Winners' Cup.

Larissa finished sixth in the league table.

== Players ==
=== Squad information ===
Note: Flags indicate national team as defined under FIFA eligibility rules; some limited exceptions apply. Players may hold more than one non-FIFA nationality.

No.	Pos.	Nation	Player
—	GK	GRE	Georgios Plitsis
—	GK	GRE	Christos Michail
—	DF	GRE	Takis Parafestas
—	DF	GRE	Georgios Mitsibonas
—	DF	GRE	Kostas Kolomitrousis
—	DF	GRE	Giannis Galitsios
—	DF	GRE	Babis Dossas
—	MF	GRE	Theodoros Voutiritsas

No.	Pos.	Nation	Player
—	MF	GRE	Michalis Ziogas
—	MF	GRE	Christos Andreoudis
—	MF	POL	Kazimierz Kmiecik
—	MF	GRE	Sakis Tsiolis
—	MF	GRE	Giannis Alexoulis
—	MF	GRE	Lazaros Kyrilidis
—	FW	POL	Krzysztof Adamczyk
—	FW	GRE	Giannis Valaoras

== Competitions ==
=== Alpha Ethniki ===
==== Classification ====
Pos	Team	Pld	W	D	L	GF	GA	GD	Pts	Qualification or relegation
4	Olympiacos	30	17	8	5	53	23	+30	42	
5	Iraklis	30	19	3	8	59	33	+26	41	
6	AEL	30	14	7	9	55	35	+20	35	Qualification for Cup Winners' Cup first round
7	Aris	30	8	14	8	38	37	+1	30	
8	Panionios	30	9	12	9	34	40	−6	30	

Source: RSSSF
Rules for classification: 1st points; 2nd head-to-head points; 3rd head-to-head goal difference; 4th decision match.

=== European Cup Winners' Cup ===
==== First round ====
Team 1	Agg.	Team 2	1st leg	2nd leg
Siófoki Bányász (Hungary)	1–3	(Greece) AEL	1–1	0–2

==== Second round ====
Team 1	Agg.	Team 2	1st leg	2nd leg
AEL (Greece)	3–1	(Switzerland) Servette	2–1	1–0

==== Quarter-finals ====
Team 1	Agg.	Team 2	1st leg	2nd leg
AEL (Greece)	0–1	(Soviet Union) Dynamo Moscow	0–0	0–1

=== Greek Cup ===
22 June 1985 Final	AEL	4–1	PAOK	Marousi
	Ziogas 39', 73'; Kmiecik 47'; Valaoras 75'		Skartados 55'	Stadium: Athens Olympic Stadium; Attendance: 24,994; Referee: Makis Germanakos (Athens)
