= Dimitrios Koukoulitsios =

Greek footballer

Personal information
- Date of birth: 1960
- Place of birth: Larissa, Greece
- Date of death: 6 September 1979 (aged 19)
- Place of death: Thiva, Greece
- Positions: Midfielder; striker

Youth career
- 1972–1975: AEL

Senior career*
Years	Team	Apps	(Gls)
1975–1979	AEL	119	(22)

International career
- Greece U17
- Greece U19
- Greece U21
- * Club domestic league appearances and goals

Dimitrios Koukoulitsios (1960 – September 6 1979) was a Greek football player during the 1970s. He played only for his hometown team AEL from 1972 to 1979. He became a professional at the early age of 15 and he earned 119 caps, scoring 22 goals. During this period, he was a part of U-17, U-19 and U21 Greece national teams.

Koukoulitsios died in a car accident in Thiva on 6 September 1979, along with his teammate Dimitrios Mousiaris. He was only 19. In the car was Giannis Valaoras too, who survived and became one of AEL's best of all times.
