= Dimitrios Mousiaris =

Greek footballer

Personal information
- Date of birth: 1959
- Place of birth: Larissa, Greece
- Date of death: 6 September 1979 (aged 20)
- Place of death: Thiva, Greece
- Position: Attacking midfielder

Youth career
- Damasiakos

Senior career*
Years	Team	Apps	(Gls)
1977–1979	AEL	64	(10)

International career
- Greece U19
- Greece U21
- * Club domestic league appearances and goals

Dimitris Mousiaris (1959 – September 6, 1979) was a Greek football player, one of the greatest talents of the 1970s. He played, as a professional, only for his hometown team AEL from 1977 to 1979, earning 64 caps and scoring 10 goals. He was a part of U19 and U21 Greece national teams and he was recognized by the great Mimis Domazos as his heir apparent.

Mousiaris died in a car accident in Thiva on 6 September 1979, along with his teammate Dimitrios Koukoulitsios. He was only 20. In the car was also Giannis Valaoras, who survived and became one of AEL's all-time best players.

In Larissa, the Koukoulitsios-Mousiaris Tournament is played to honor the players.
