= Alexis Kougias =

Greek penologist, lawyer

- Αλέξης Κούγιας
- Born: Alexios Kougias; 23 January 1951; Petroupoli, Kingdom of Greece
- Died: 28 February 2025 (aged 74); Piraeus, Greece
- Burial place: First Cemetery of Athens
- Education: Aristotle University of Thessaloniki Thessaloniki, Greece; National and Kapodistrian University of Athens Athens, Greece
- Occupations: Lawyer; penologist
- Spouse: Matilda Nahama (m. 1983; died 1983) Evi Vatidou (m. 2001; div. 2007)
- Children: 2

Alexios Kougias (Greek: Αλέξιος «Αλέξης» Κούγιας; 23 January 1951 – 28 February 2025) was a Greek lawyer, penologist.

== Early life ==
Kougias was born in Petroupolis on 23 January 1951. He studied law at the University of Thessaloniki and at the University of Athens, from where he graduated.

== Law career ==
Kougias first generated publicity in 1978, as an advocate of notorious criminal Vangelis Rochamis. He also practiced criminal law in known cases, including "the trial of Satanists", the trial of Argyris Saliarelis, the trial Express Samina disaster, the trial of the terrorist organizations and ELA and 17 November Group. In December 2008 he took over the defense of the policeman who fatally shot 15 year old Alexis Grigoropoulos. According to his statements, he took 17,500 trials, including 5,000 felonies. Kougias was involved in some of Greece’s most controversial cases to date, facing mass criticism by the Greek Media.

== Ιnvolvement in football ==
=== Player ===
Kougias started playing football for Aris Petroupolis at the age of 18 in the second Division. He played for Olympiakos Loutraki. In 1973, he was transferred to Iraklis Thessaloniki. In 1978, he returned to Olympiakos Loutraki and later at Pelops Kiato.

=== Owner - President ===
Alongside his career in law, he was heavily involved in sports ownership and administration. Between 1997 and 2004 he served as president of AEK Athens. He served as president of Korinthos, Aris Petroupolis, Veria, PAS Giannina, Lamia and Panahaiki. Kougias also represented Iraklis at the EPAE committee. By the late 2000s, Kougias was a major stakeholder at Larissa-based football club AEL. For a short period in 2024, he was a Vice-President of Olympiacos F.C.

In 2014, Kougias claimed on a television show that a "criminal organization" had been operating in Greek football since 1996, consisting of club officials, referees, and judges, with protection from powerful figures who manipulated championships and UEFA bonuses. In court, he stated that the "Koriopolis" scandal was orchestrated by Nikos Pateras, along with Giannis Alafouzos, Kyriakos Thomaidis, and Makis Triantafyllopoulos, to damage Evangelos Marinakis. He also accused Nikos Pateras of using Supreme Court Deputy Prosecutor Isidoros Dogiakos to intercept Marinakis' phone conversations, later handing them over to the investigating judge Giorgos Andreadis, who proceeded with prosecution.

== Personal life ==
Kougias lived in Athens. He married at the age of 32, but his wife died in a car accident shortly after. On 24 January 2001, he married model and TV presenter Evi Vatidou, but they divorced in October 2007. They had two children, Christos Kougias (born 9 March 2002) and Maira Kougia (born 20 January 2005), both of whom studied law.

=== Illness and death ===
In January 2022, a nuclear medicine (PET scan) examination revealed early-stage cancer in his lymph nodes. He kept this diagnosis secret from both his children and his closest colleagues and continued his legal work until late July when he underwent a six-hour robotic surgery to remove cancerous lymph nodes, along with 39 others as a precaution.

In January 2025, he announced he had also been diagnosed with prostate cancer and subsequently underwent hormone therapy and immunotherapy. On 24 February, his children announced that his health was in a "very critical" condition following a severe bacterial infection.

Kougias died of cancer at Metropolitan Hospital, on 28 February 2025, at age 74.
