= Luca Andrada =

Argentine footballer

Personal information
- Full name: Luca Javier Andrada
- Date of birth: 22 April 2001 (age 25)
- Place of birth: Lanús, Argentina
- Height: 1.79 m (5 ft 10 in)
- Position: Midfielder

Team information
- Current team: AEL
- Number: 57

Youth career
- 2008–2019: Racing Club

Senior career*
Years	Team	Apps	(Gls)
2019–2024	Racing Club	2	(0)
2022	→ Estudiantes BA (loan)	7	(0)
2022–2024	→ AEL (loan)	48	(4)
2024–	AEL	20	(0)
- * Club domestic league appearances and goals as of 21 September 2026

Luca Javier Andrada (born 22 April 2001) is an Argentine professional footballer who plays as a midfielder for Greek Super League 2 club AEL.

== Career ==
Andrade joined the youth academy of Racing Club at the age of 7. On 19 January 2020, Andrada signed his first professional contract with Racing Club. Andrada made his professional debut with Racing Club in a 1–1 Argentine Primera División tie with Defensa y Justicia on 20 November 2019. In January 2022, Andrada joined Estudiantes de Buenos Aires on a one-year loan deal.
