= Marco Förster =

German footballer (born 1976)

Personal information
- Full name: Marco Herbert Förster
- Date of birth: 23 April 1976 (age 50)
- Place of birth: Frankfurt (Oder), East Germany
- Height: 1.88 m (6 ft 2 in)
- Position: Defender

Senior career*
Years	Team	Apps	(Gls)
1995–1997	Lokomotive Leipzig	19	(0)
1997–1998	FSV Zwickau	16	(0)
1998–2000	Lokomotive Leipzig	28	(2)
2000	Rot-Weiss Essen	1	(0)
2001	Akratitos	10	(0)
2001–2002	Ethnikos Piraeus	27	(2)
2002–2003	Athinaikos	9	(0)
2003–2004	Ilisiakos	33	(1)
2004–2008	AEL	64	(4)
2008–2009	A.E. Paphos	10	(0)
2009–2010	Anagennisi Karditsa	15	(2)
2010–2011	FCO Neugersdorf		
2013–2014	SV See 90		
- * Club domestic league appearances and goals

Marco Förster (born 23 April 1976) is a German former professional footballer who played as a defender.

== Career ==
His main abilities are his good balance and defensive positioning, along with his consistency during the game. Förster was a personal selection of Georgios Donis when he was head coach at Ilisiakos and he followed Donis when he became the coach of AEL in 2004. From then on, he was an important unit for Larissa as a starting player or a substitute, and club's vice-captain, behind Nikos Dabizas. He earned 87 caps and scored five goals for the Maroons. He faced German club 1. FC Nürnberg in the 2007–08 UEFA Cup. His career highlight was when he won the Greek Cup with AEL in 2007 against Panathinaikos. He left Larissa on 1 July 2008 and joined Anagennisi Karditsa, where he scored two goals and was included in the best defenders of Beta Ethniki.

== Honours ==
AEL

- Greek Cup: 2006–07
