= Spyros Christopoulos =

Greek footballer (born 1975)

Personal information
- Full name: Spyridon Christopoulos
- Date of birth: 7 October 1975 (age 51)
- Place of birth: Gastouni, Greece
- Height: 1.89 m (6 ft 2 1/2 in)
- Position: Goalkeeper

Youth career
- 1995: Olympiacos Volos

Senior career*
Years	Team	Apps	(Gls)
1996–1997	Pyrgos	6	(0)
1997	Olympiacos Volos	1	(0)
1997–1998	Asteras Amaliada	11	(0)
1998–1999	Achaiki	6	(0)
1999–2001	Asteras Vlachioti	16	(0)
2001–2004	Ilisiakos	32	(0)
2004–2007	AEL	24	(0)
2007–2009	Thrasyvoulos	6	(0)
- * Club domestic league appearances and goals as of 12 December 2015

Spyros Christopoulos (Greek: Σπύρος Χριστόπουλος; born 7 October 1975) is a retired Greek footballer who played as a goalkeeper mostly for AEL and Thrasyvoulos in the Super League Greece. He now works as a goalkeeper's coach in teams of lower leagues.
