= Konstantinos Piladakis =

Greek Businessman (born 1966)

- Κωνσταντίνος Πηλαδάκης
- Born: 17 August 1966 (age 59); Athens, Greece
- Citizenship: Greek
- Education: Moraitis School
- Occupation: Businessman
- Known for: Ownership of Vivere Entertainment; former owner/chairman of AEL Football club
- Spouse: Doretta Papadimitriou (m. 2004; div. 2011)
- Partner: Nafsika Panagiotakopoulou (2020–present)
- Children: 3

Konstantinos Piladakis (Greek: Κωνσταντίνος Πηλαδάκης; born 17 August 1966) is a Greek businessman primarily known for his involvement in the entertainment, casino, and sports industries. He is the owner of Vivere Entertainment, which operates casinos in Xanthi and was previously involved with the Casino Hotel Rio and others in Corfu and Alexandroupoli. He was previously the owner and chairman of Greek professional football club, Athlitiki Enosi Larissa.

== Early life and education ==
Konstantinos Piladakis was born in Athens, Greece, on August 17, 1966. He attended Moraitis School. In his youth, he was involved in sports as a basketball player.

== Career ==
Piladakis had business interests in sectors that included entertainment, real estate, and sports.

=== Entertainment and gambling ===
He became the owner of Vivere Entertainment and the Casino Xanthi. His portfolio also previously included the license for the Casino Hotel Rio near Patra, which closed in September 2023 after its restructuring plan was rejected. Casinos in Corfu and Alexandroupoli, which he owned, have also faced closure amid legal challenges. He was also the chairman of V2 Records Hellas.

=== Sports ===
Piladakis began his administrative career in sports with the Piraikos and Ilysiakos basketball teams. In 2001, his involvement shifted to football when he took over Ilysiakos F.C., achieving a double promotion from Delta Ethniki to the Football League. From 2004 to 2013, he served as the owner and chairman of Athlitiki Enosi Larissa F.C. (AEL FC).

He is one of the founding members of the Greek Superleague cooperative and vice president in 2007 and from the summer of 2008 until the summer of 2009, he was the 3rd chairman of the association.

=== Other businesses ===
Also, he is the founder of air company Virgin Atlantic (Greece, 1992 – 2002) and has been directing adviser until 1999.

== Recognition ==
He was awarded best new Greek businessman of the year in 2003 by former Secretary-General of United Nations, Boutros Boutros-Ghali, at the Leaders of the Year 2003 event.
