= Costas Aslanidis =

Costas Aslanidis (Greek: Κωνσταντίνος Ασλανίδης; 1919 - 1984) was a Lieutenant Colonel and the Secretary General of Sports during the rule of the Greek military junta of 1967–1974.

Aslanidis was a controversial figure throughout his tenure as secretary general. On 30 January 1968, in a speech at the Alexandrion Melathron of Thessaloniki, he alleged that corruption was rife in Greek sports. He mentioned that Panathinaikos had paid off referees and linesmen, that Egaleo defender, Tzekos Balarinis, had accepted a 7,000 drachmas bribe to throw his team's game and that Ethnikos Piraeus' star goalkeeper, Kostas Vallianos, had also accepted bribes to throw his team's games. Aslanidis went further and blasted PAOK forward, Giorgos Koudas, for wanting to leave his team for Olympiacos.

Aslanidis imposed complex rules for transfers in the Greek League: No player could transfer within his own division and no player could transfer to a higher division. However, Aslanidis made exceptions to his own rules, most noteworthy of which was the transfer of Aspida Xanthi forward, Antonis Antoniadis, to Panathinaikos.

Aslanidis was instrumental in having the Champions of Cyprus play in the Greek league between the years 1968 and 1974. Olympiakos Nicosia FC were the first champions to participate and APOEL the last. The latter club was the only Cypriot team not to be relegated.

Throughout his tenure Aslanidis insisted that athletes be well-groomed and clean-shaven. Aslanidis fled to Italy following the collapse of the Junta in 1974 and then moved to Brazil. Later, he returned to Greece where he died.
