= Antonis Georgiadis =

Greek footballer and manager (1935–2020)

- Antonis Georgiadis with Greece

Personal information
- Full name: Antonios Georgiadis
- Date of birth: 12 February 1935
- Place of birth: Drama, Greece
- Date of death: 16 November 2020 (aged 85)
- Position: Midfielder

Youth career
- –1950: Doxa Drama

Senior career*
Years	Team	Apps	(Gls)
1950–1960	Doxa Drama		

Managerial career
- 1961–1963: Elpis Drama
- 1963–1964: Iraklis Serres
- 1964–1966: Panserraikos
- 1966–1968: Kavala
- 1968–1970: Doxa Drama
- 1970–1974: Olympiacos Volos
- 1974–1976: PAS Giannina
- 1977: Panachaiki
- 1977–1979: PAS Giannina
- 1979–1980: OFI
- 1980–1982: AEL
- 1982–1984: Aris
- 1984–1985: AEK Athens
- 1985–1986: Olympiacos
- 1986–1988: Apollon Kalamarias
- 1988–1989: Ethnikos Piraeus
- 1989–1992: Greece
- 1990: Paniliakos
- 1993: Olympiacos
- 1993–1996: Paniliakos
- 1997–1998: Olympiacos Volos
- * Club domestic league appearances and goals

Antonis Georgiadis (Greek: Αντώνης Γεωργιάδης, 12 February 1935 – 16 November 2020) was a Greek football player and manager.

== Career ==
Georgiadis managed Elpis Drama, Iraklis Serres, Panserraikos, Kavala, Doxa Drama, Olympiacos Volos, PAS Giannina, Panachaiki, OFI, AEL, Aris, AEK Athens, Olympiacos, Apollon Kalamarias, Ethnikos Piraeus Greece, and Paniliakos.

== Managerial statistics ==
Managerial record by team and tenure
Team	From	To	Record				
Team	From	To	P	W	D	L	Win %
Elpis Drama	8 August 1961	29 May 1963	52	24	15	13	46.2
Ιraklis Serres Panserraikos	2 June 1963	25 May 1966	105	53	25	27	50.5
Kavala	28 May 1966	26 May 1968	71	41	14	16	57.7
Doxa Drama	3 June 1968	19 May 1970	71	40	16	15	56.3
Olympiacos Volos	19 May 1970	6 May 1974	145	57	28	60	39.3
PAS Giannina	4 July 1974	15 June 1976	67	29	12	26	43.3
Panachaiki	14 March 1977	18 June 1977	11	5	2	4	45.5
PAS Giannina	21 June 1977	30 June 1979	73	26	20	27	35.6
OFI	7 July 1979	28 June 1980	35	11	10	14	31.4
AEL	2 July 1980	30 June 1982	78	31	18	29	39.7
Aris	8 July 1982	19 June 1984	74	36	20	18	48.6
AEK Athens	11 December 1984	18 June 1985	20	12	6	2	60.0
Olympiacos	20 June 1985	11 October 1986	48	25	10	13	52.1
Apollon Kalamarias	25 November 1986	12 September 1988	61	18	16	27	29.5
Ethnikos Piraeus	25 October 1988	10 January 1989	10	0	4	6	0.0
Greece	5 April 1989	17 June 1992	31	11	9	11	35.5
Olympiacos (caretaker)	25 January 1993	29 January 1993	1	1	0	0	100.0
Paniliakos	6 July 1993	12 March 1996	106	54	29	23	50.9
Olympiacos Volos	3 August 1997	15 May 1998	30	12	7	11	40.0
Managerial career total			1,089	486	261	342	44.63

- List does not include summer competitions sponsored by the Greek FA in the 1960s and 1970s.

== See also ==
- List of football managers with the most matches
