= Christos Andreoudis =

Greek footballer

Personal information
- Date of birth: 10 May 1959 (age 67)
- Place of birth: Larissa, Greece
- Height: 1.74 m (5 ft 9 in)
- Position: Midfielder

Senior career*
Years	Team	Apps	(Gls)
1976–1987	AEL		
1987–1988	Iraklis		
1988–1989	Diagoras		
1989–1990	Niki Volos		
- * Club domestic league appearances and goals

Christos Andreoudis (Greek: Χρήστος Ανδρεούδης; born 10 May 1959) is a retired Greek football midfielder.
