= Andrzej Strejlau =

Polish footballer and handball player (born 1940)

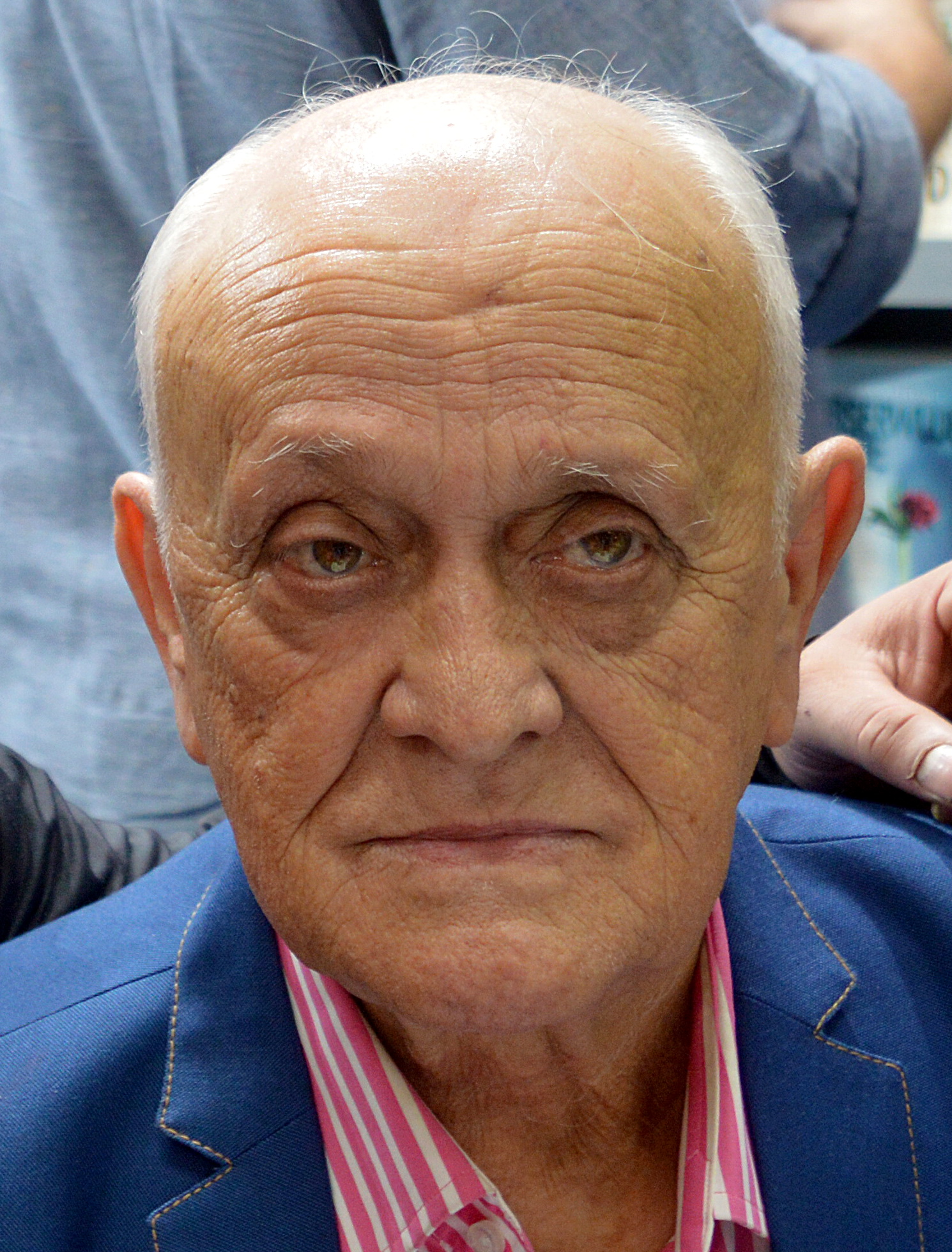
- Strejlau in 2018

Personal information
- Date of birth: 19 February 1940 (age 86)
- Place of birth: Warsaw, Poland
- Height: 1.74 m (5 ft 9 in)
- Position: Defender

Senior career*
Years	Team	Apps	(Gls)
1954–1963	AZS-AWF Warsaw		
1964	Gwardia Warsaw	2	(0)
1965–1966	Hutnik Warsaw		
1966	Legia Warsaw II		

Managerial career
- 1964–1965: Hutnik Warsaw
- 1966–1968: AZS-AWF Warsaw
- 1968–1970: Poland U18
- 1970–1975: Poland U23
- 1975–1979: Legia Warsaw
- 1979–1980: Zagłębie Sosnowiec
- 1982–1983: Fram
- 1984–1986: AEL
- 1987–1989: Legia Warsaw
- 1989–1993: Poland
- 1995–1996: Zagłębie Lubin
- 1997–1998: Shanghai Shenhua
- * Club domestic league appearances and goals

Andrzej Michał Strejlau (born 19 February 1940) is a Polish former professional football manager and player.

From 1989 to 1993 he was the manager of Poland national team. He also coached many teams from different parts of the world, such as China, Iceland and Greece.

He has coached Poland U23, Legia Warsaw, Zagłębie Sosnowiec, Knattspyrnufélagið Fram, AEL,Shanghai Shenhua F.C. and Zagłębie Lubin.

== Honours ==
Larissa

- Greek Cup: 1984–85

Legia Warsaw

- Polish Cup: 1988–89
- Polish Super Cup: 1989
