= Nikos Patsiavouras =

Greek footballer

Personal information
- Full name: Nikolaos Patsiavouras
- Date of birth: 29 May 1958 (age 68)
- Place of birth: Larissa, Greece
- Position: Defender

Senior career*
Years	Team	Apps	(Gls)
1978–1985	AEL	142	(4)
1985–1988	Panathinaikos	47	(0)
1989–1990	Aris	20	(1)
Total		209	(5)

International career
1985	Greece	1	(0)
- * Club domestic league appearances and goals

Nikolaos Patsiavouras (Greek: Νικόλαος Πατσιαβούρας) (born 29 May 1958 in Larissa, Greece) is a former football defender.

Patsiavouras finished his playing career with Aris Thessaloniki F.C. in the 1989–90 season.

He made one appearance for the Greece national football team.
