= Kostas Maloumidis =

Greek manager and former footballer

Personal information
- Full name: Konstantinos Maloumidis
- Date of birth: 4 March 1956 (age 70)
- Place of birth: Kaisariana, Greece
- Height: 1.71 m (5 ft 7 in)
- Positions: Supporting striker; striker

Youth career
- Edessaikos

Senior career*
Years	Team	Apps	(Gls)
1979–1984	AEL	154	(27)
1984–1988	Iraklis	72	(12)
Total		226	(39)

International career
1983–1984	Greece	3	(0)

Managerial career
- 1998: Iraklis
- 2016–2017: Edessaikos
- * Club domestic league appearances and goals

Kostas Maloumidis (born 4 March 1956 in Greece) is a former football supporting striker. He played for AEL] and Iraklis. His last team in his career was Edessaikos.

== International career ==
Maloumidis appeared in three matches for the senior Greece national football team from 1983 to 1984.
