= Kostas Kolomitrousis =

Greek footballer

Personal information
- Full name: Konstantinos Kolomitrousis
- Date of birth: 30 March 1964 (age 62)
- Place of birth: Larissa, Greece
- Height: 1.80 m (5 ft 11 in)
- Position: Left back

Senior career*
Years	Team	Apps	(Gls)
1984–1990	AEL	131	(2)
1990–1993	Aris	77	(7)
1993–1996	AEL	72	(4)
Total		280	(13)

International career
1986–1988	Greece	16	(0)
- * Club domestic league appearances and goals

Kostas Kolomitrousis (Greek: Κώστας Κολομητρούσης; born 30 March 1964) is a Greek former professional football player and currently the coach of the youth team of AEL. He played as a left back for AEL and Aris in the Greek Super League.

== International career ==
Kolomitrousis appeared in 16 matches for the senior Greece national football team from 1986 to 1988.

== Honors ==
AEL

- Alpha Ethniki: 1987–88
- Greek Cup: 1984–85
