= Athlitiki Enosi Larissa F.C. =

Men's association football team in Greece

AEL
- Full name: Athlitiki Enosi Larissa Football Club
- Nicknames: Βασίλισσα του Κάμπου (Queen of the Plains); Οι Βυσσινί (The Crimsons)
- Short name: AEL
- Founded: 17 May 1964; 62 years ago
- Ground: AEL FC Arena
- Capacity: 17,118
- Owner: Zisis Stilianos
- President: Konstantinos Kleisaris
- Head coach: Sokratis Ofrydopoulos
- League: Super League Greece 2
- 2025–26: Super League Greece, 13th of 14 (relegated)
- Website: www.aelfc.gr
Home colours	Away colours

Athlitiki Enosi Larissa Football Club (Greek: ΠΑΕ ΑΕΛ – Αθλητικής Ένωσης Λάρισας, romanized: Athlitiki Enosi Larissa, lit. 'Athletic Union of Larissa'), often known as AEL or Larissa, and AEL Novibet for sponsorship reasons, is a Greek professional football club based in the city of Larissa, capital of Greece's Thessaly region.

Founded in 1964, when 4 of the most prominent local football clubs decided to unite, it is directly associated with the city of Larissa and its representation. The club's emblem is a rearing horse, and its colors are crimson and white. It is the only team based outside of the major Greek cities (Athens and Thessaloniki) to have won the Greek Championship, which happened in the 1987–88 season. AEL has also won the Greek Cup twice (1984–85 and 2006–07) and finished as came runners-up in the Cup finals of 1982 and 1984. It's the most successful club outside Athens and Thessaloniki. The team has a large and dedicated fan base and rivalries with other prominent Greek clubs, such as PAOK and Olympiacos.

AEL had also participated in European competitions, reaching the league phase of UEFA Cup in 2007–2008. Most notably, it has reached the quarter finals of the UEFA Cup Winner's Cup during the 1984–85 season.

AEL play their home games at AEL FC Arena, a pure football ground with a capacity of 17,118 seats which can expand to 33,000 making it the third largest Stadium in Greece.

== History ==
Athletic Union of Larissa, The "Queen of Thessaly", the "Queen of the lowlands". AEL, is the club that represents the Greek prefecture of Larissa. One Championship, two cups, four finals and many important successes at European level compose the temporal profile of the top team of the Greek region.

=== Creation and first years (1964–79) ===
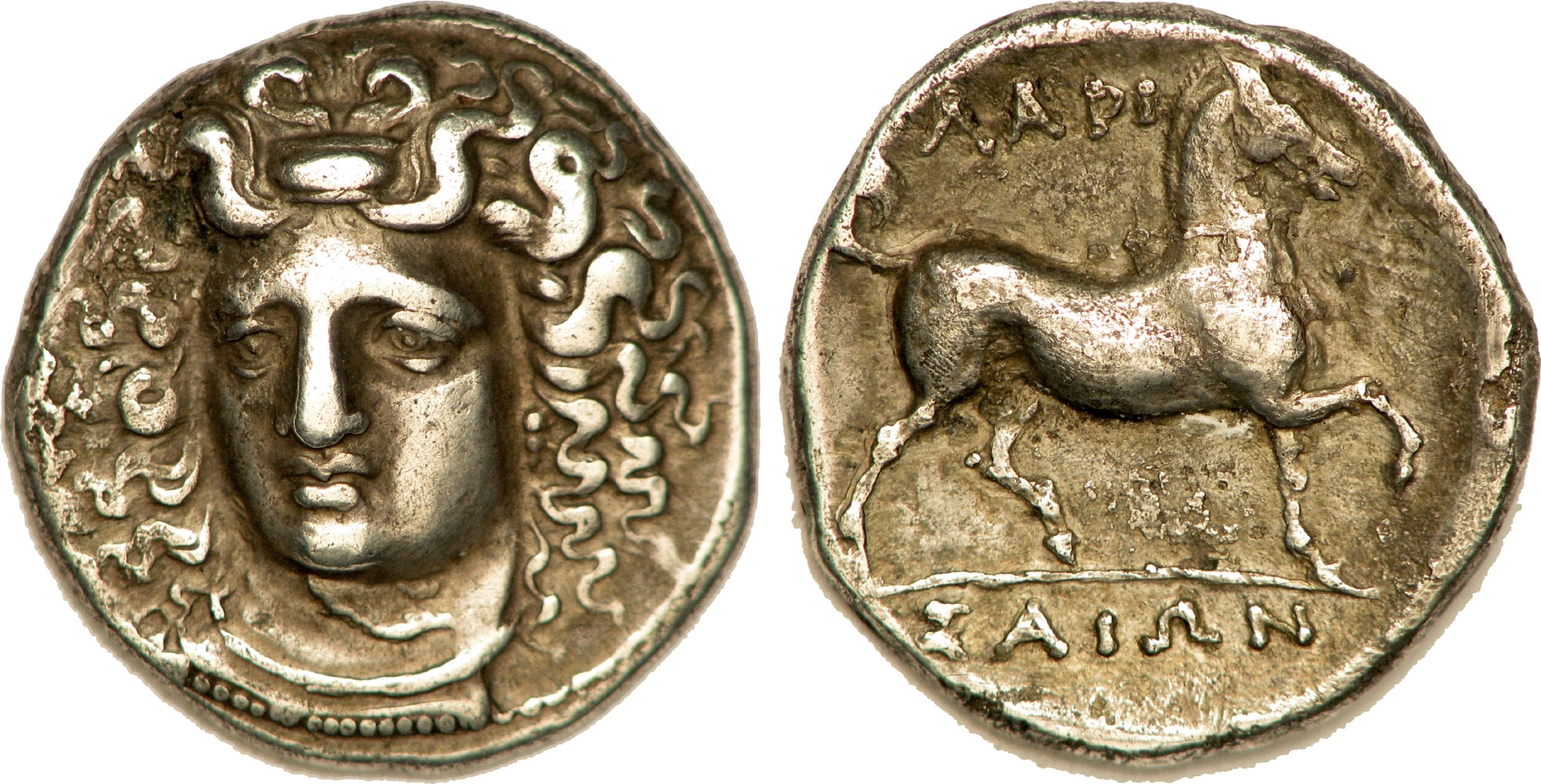
The horse is the official symbol of the city of Larissa

AEL was founded with the aim of creating a strong team to represent Larissa in the top division. The 17 May 1964, is referred to as the exact date of its establishment, and then—after a barrage of meetings and discussions held at the Municipal Conservatory of Larissa and a catalytic last meeting of the local county clubs—it was decided the merger of:

Iraklis Larissa (1930), "Aris" (1926), "Toxotis" (1943) and "Larissaikos" (1930). The Athletic Union of Larissa was now a reality, designed on the background of the Second Division, in shades of crimson and white not black and white, as initially decided. Typically, the conversion of the statute of Iraklis Larissa just a few days later—on 22 May—and its adoption on 8 June, gave AEL status, while teams "Dimitra", "Doxa Emporoipalilon" (based on "Aris Larissas" and "Doxa"), "Pelasgiotida" (by "Larissaikos" and "Pelasgikos") and "Olympos" (based on "Toxotis" and "Panthessalikos") completed this football family. On 7 June, Alcazar Stadium, the team's first homeground, recorded the initial friendly game, against Panionios which, by that time, was a very strong team, winning 2–1. Yugoslavian Alexander Petrovic, was the first foreign coach that was hired to ensure the impartiality of the team lineup. Thus, names of players like Zampas, Karelias, Kyriakos, Lellis, Papazoglou, Kassas, Saltapidas, Delfos, Katsianis and many others, passed into the history of Thessalian football. Everything was ready to start, under the administrative umbrella of a 15-member ecumenical council, composed of representatives of clubs and organizations of the city, in which the property was held by the former president of Iraklis Larissa, K. Tzovaridis.

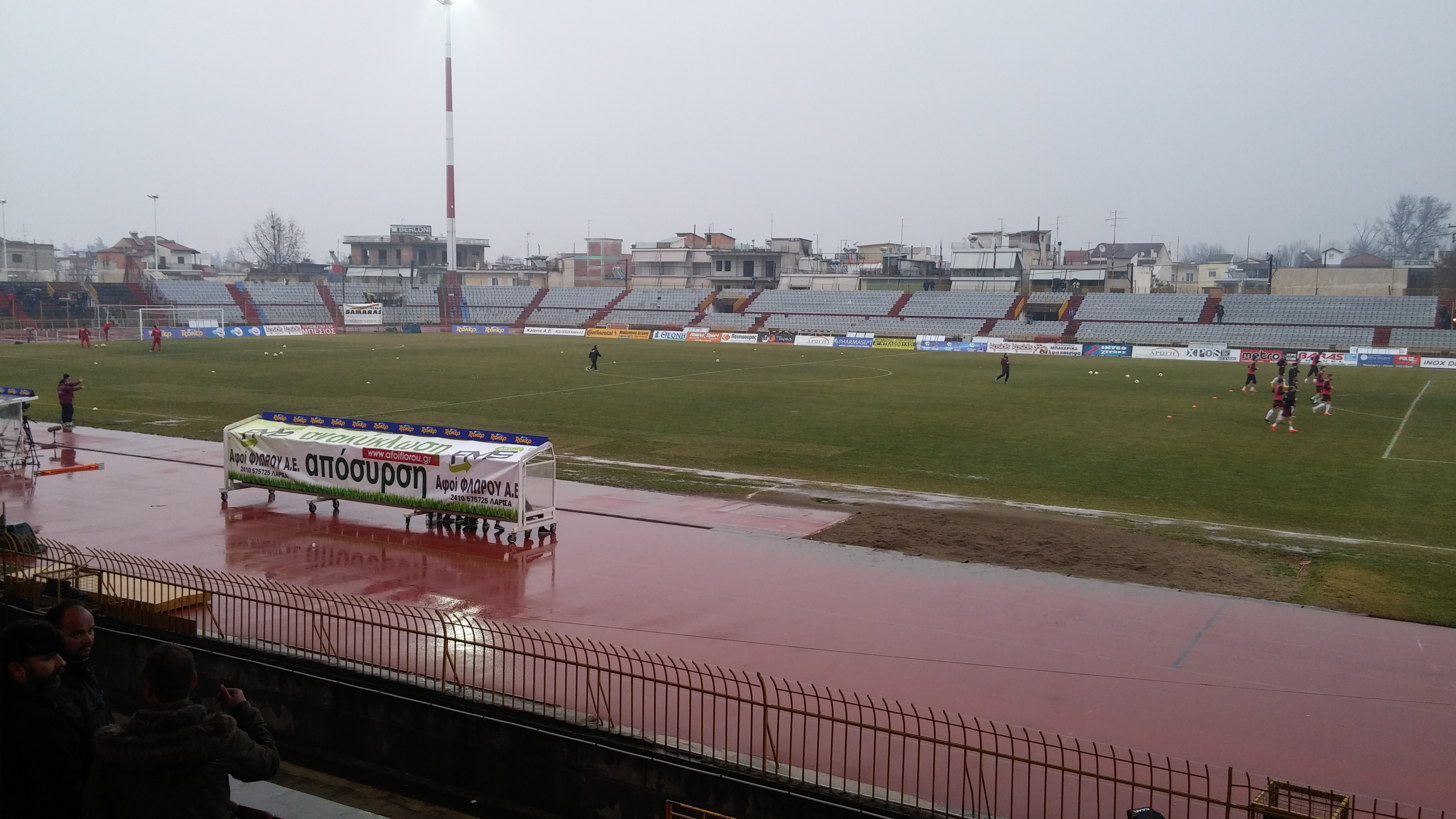
Alcazar Stadium, the club's initial homeground

Examples of other Greek areas where the mergers and establishment of strong teams brought direct impact and a promotion in the 1st Division, has created in advance an optimism which did not materialize. The team ended the 1964–65 season in fifth place. The next year, the team improved by two seats in the final table. The promotion was lost in a game on 8 May 1966 at Megara with the home side Vyzas opponent. During the entry of the team on the field, player Dimitrios Zambas was hit in the head by a ladder thrown from the stands and was taken to the hospital. The team with 10 players due to the elimination of Kyriakidis from the first quarter, and with three of the 10 remaining players injured, had formal presence, and was defeated 6–0. As well-known coaches like Dionysis Minardos, Giannis Helmis and Giourkas Seitaridis the first turned down the opportunity to steer the team, the downturn seemed certain and in 1969 their position fell even further. Relegation would be inevitable if the political conditions of the time—Greek military junta of 1967–1974—and the fact that teams headed by powerful men were in the same predicament, brought changes in the status of Greek football. Therefore, Kostas Aslanidis, Lieutenant Colonel and the Secretary General of Athletics, increased the two groups of the Second Division to three and thus AEL, Chania and Ionikos continued in the B' National. There was a rationalization of the Second Division, by creating three groups of 16 teams, of which 15 would be relegated (five of each group) into the 3rd Division. Relegation did not happen and it was decided the next season that each group have 18 teams. Otherwise, like the previous season, the winners of groups (three this time) went to the final phase, which claimed the promotion in the 1st Division. The team indeed, with the entrance to the 1970s, the emergence of the administrative forefront of Kantonias family (the owner of BIOKARPET Group) and a dramatic changing at liveware, managed to change the status. The coming of some experienced players such as Simantiris, Kyziroglou, Charitidis and Nikiforakis framed the talented Lakis Pagkarliotas and the others.

25–06–1972 : It was the last game of the championship of the Second Division. AEL needed the victory to celebrate the promotion in the First National (the team had 95 points while opponent Panserraikos had 96 and only the first of the group would promote). In the Serres Municipal Stadium that day (which holds the all-time attendance record with 14,200 tickets) except the locals, also existed around 5000 guest fans from Larissa. Nevertheless, AEL managed to precede with 0–1 but Panserraikos equalized with a disputed penalty. Soon riots appeared between the players on the court and generalized at the end of the match between the fans (final result 1–1). The next day, thousands citizens of Larissa were gathered and resentful of the injustice marched to the central square of the city. The demonstration took the character of an anti-junta movement. One of the few mass events that were made in Greece before the events of Athens Polytechnic. Two days later AEL submitted an objection for the improper use of the player of Panserraikos Stefanidis. The Regulations Committee EPO upheld the complaint because Panserraikos did not pay the fine of 250 Drachmas for the penalty. On 30 June, the same committee in another meeting and after the intervention of Colonel Aslanidis (himself originating from Serres), dismissed the objection of AEL and promoted Panserraikos to the 1st National.

AEL lineup in that match: Siavalas, Buttos, Simantiris, Kyziroglou, Lellis, (63' Makris), Nikiforakis, (50' Zachos), Charitidis, Argiroulis, Stergiadis, Seitaridis, Gkountelitsas. Eventually, what the team of Kostas Polychroniou failed to fulfil then, became reality one year later for the team of Stefan Karamfilovic.

==== The first promotion ====
A season that was started with President Antonios Kantonias, continued with Michalis Kittas and ended up headed by Mayor Messinis, was to be the top—until then—for the "crimsons" who rejoiced in the finale closing, the coveted promotion. It was the year that Horacio Morales, Daniel Hill, Giorgio Vajeho, Guillermo Daus and Enrique Cavoli flew from Argentina and "landed" at Alcazar. Just months earlier they had played with the colors of Independiente against AC Milan in the Intercontinental Cup. On 23 June 1973, AEL wins Kallithea 3–0 and seal typically the promotion in the First National, finishing first with 98 points, ahead of the second renaissance Karditsa who finished with 89 points. The goals for AEL succeed by Pagkarliotas at 16', D. Seitaridis at 38' and Charitidis at 80'. AEL lined up on the field with the following players: Siavalas, Simantiris, Seitaridis M., Hill, Kyziroglou, Boutos, Charitidis, Cavoli, Rakintzoglou, Seitaridis and Pagkarliotas.. The team started the season 1973–74 at the First National, with the enthusiasm of a rookie, but clearly capable of material, grafted by the talent and quality players like Kyriakidis, Matzourakis and Dramalis in order to stay in the category. The course was based on the overall strength of the home ground and the final 9th position was considered highly successful. Karamfilovic was replaced (due to expired residence to the country that was not renewed for political reasons), by the Bulgarian coach Ivan Kochev. However, a team built on legionnaires without first having obtained the financial strength and solid basis, couldn't have long term evolution. So, the very next year problems started, which led to hasty choices, judgments and frequent upheavals in all levels. Inevitably therefore, the team didn't avoided the relegation and on summer of '75 returned to the Second Division. Since an immediate return was considered impossible, the rebuilding of the team began slowly, mainly based in local Larissa's area players. More experienced Siavalas, Boutos, Lellis, Stergiadis, and Argiroulis formed the backbone on which, as time went on, had positive impact for the team. Of course, the great breakthrough was made a year later by President Elias Kelesidis and his colleagues in the administration, when they decided to promote to the first team all of the youth squad of AEL, and collect all the talents that admittedly stood well in the Thessalian prefecture. Thus, on 26 May 1977, in a friendly match against AEK (the first under spotlights in Alcazar stadium), AEL lined up with Anagnostou, Giannis Mousouris and nine native players from Larissa's region. Among them, unknown then, Takis Parafestas, Giannis Valaoras, Dimitris Koukoulitsios and Christos Andreoudis. That summer of 77, rookies including Dimitris Mousiaris and Giannis Valaoras signed a professional contract. These two, along with Koukoulitsios and Ilias Selionis, became members of the youth National teams. On 18 June 1978 AEL traveled in Thessaloniki, and celebrated on the pitch of Nea Efkarpia a great victory against Macedonikos (4–1), finishing first with 59 points ahead of Olympiacos Volos, who eventually collected 57 points, while ensured the return in the major league of Greek football as the champion of the Northern Group of Second Division. Koukoulitsios scored the goals for AEL at 17' and 60', Valaoras at 31' and Liapis at 87'. AEL lined up on the field with the following players: Bountolos, Parafestas, Selionis, Dramalis, Argiroulis, Koumarias (63' Koukoulitsios), Andreoudis, Liapis, Mousiaris, Valaoras (61' Rammos).. The period 1977–78, completed the work of the previous season when AEL had finished in third place with 46 points. The balanced combination of experienced and talented players managed to create a strong team that succeeded in gaining the promotion. AEL returned to the First National and now, the solid foundations on which founded this football building, guaranteed a 15-year establishment and recognition that followed.

=== 1980s: the Golden Decade ===
The successful policy of carefully selected few experienced and many talented young players continued and AEL not only threatened, but started slowly building a bright future, often achieving results that showed that something big was coming up. However, the same policy maintained by all administrations in the 80s, with proper and prudent management of its human material, gradually cultivated by coaches like Yugoslavian Milan Ribar, and later Kostas Polychroniou and Antonis Georgiadis. Some players selectively exiled the team. While the team has changed almost everything from the beginning to the end of the decade, in the conscience of some fans it has remained as one and single season. It was the era of AEL or better AEL FC, since in the summer of 1979 it was decided the organization of Greek football on a professional basis. The late Antonios Kantonias, raising the prestige and power of the group "BIOKARPET" was the one who managed to secure the independence of the club. Health reasons disallowed him to continue as President of the Interim Committee and the chair of the first administration and was finally replaced by Simos Palaiochorlidis.

==== Grieving for young talents ====
On 6 September 1979, Dimitris Koukoulitsios and Dimitris Mousiaris, were killed in a car crash near Thiva, on their way to Athens for a training with the U-21 National team.

==== The "Small Hamburg": 1981–82 Greek Cup finalists, 1982–83 Greek League runners-up ====
With a stable administration, new faces on the roster, Maloumidis, Galitsios, Golandas and gradually Voutyritsas and Mitsibonas and with the advent of the technical leadership of Antonis Georgiadis, AEL was beginning to show its "teeth". Best Regional team for the 1980–81 season, AEL claimed the European exit in the final league game. Participation in the Greek Cup final in the summer of '82, for the first time in its history, and a 1–0 defeat by Panathinaikos in the Nea Philadelfeia stadium. The "greens" succeeded to the finals before the end of the championship and the barrage against Olympiacos, in the neutral Volos, having the certainty that it would provide them in advance the Cup. On that historic first final that was held on 19 June 1982, AEL lined up with the following players: Plitsis, Parafestas, Patsiavouras, Galitsios, Argiroulis, Dramalis (82' Voutyritsas) Maloumidis, Golantas, Koutas (82' Mitsibonas) Andreoudis, Valaoras. The next season (1982–83) they came to claim the title after a great victory in the second round at the Karaiskaki Stadium derby against Olympiacos. Eventually, the second place constituted the ultimate fulfillment for Jacek Gmoch's players, who had been under strong denial because of the modest beginning of the team in the first round of the championship.

==== 1983–84 Greek Cup finalists ====
The team of '82–83 season yielded modern, fast and sophisticated football and was referred to with the nickname "Small Hamburg", after the German team. The first exit in Europe was an effort that lasted several years, even though AEL ultimately failed to overcome the obstacle of the very strong Hungarian team Budapest Honvéd FC.

Under Austrian coach Walter Skocik, AEL won the semi-final match against Iraklis on the 3rd June 1984. They would lose the Cup Final on 6 June 1984, against Panathinaikos in their ground, the Athens Olympic Stadium. The score was a 2-0 loss. Player Giannis Valaoras was suspended for this match. The next season, president Kostas Samaras and coach Andrzej Strejlau (who brought Polish player Krzysztof Adamczyk with him), were very optimistic about the team's course. They participated in the Cup Winners' Cup for the period 1984–85 and were defeated after two quarter-finals by the Soviets of Dynamo Moscow. AEL qualified for the Greek Cup final and succeeded a record for best offensive productivity in the season.

==== 1984–85 Greek Cup winners ====
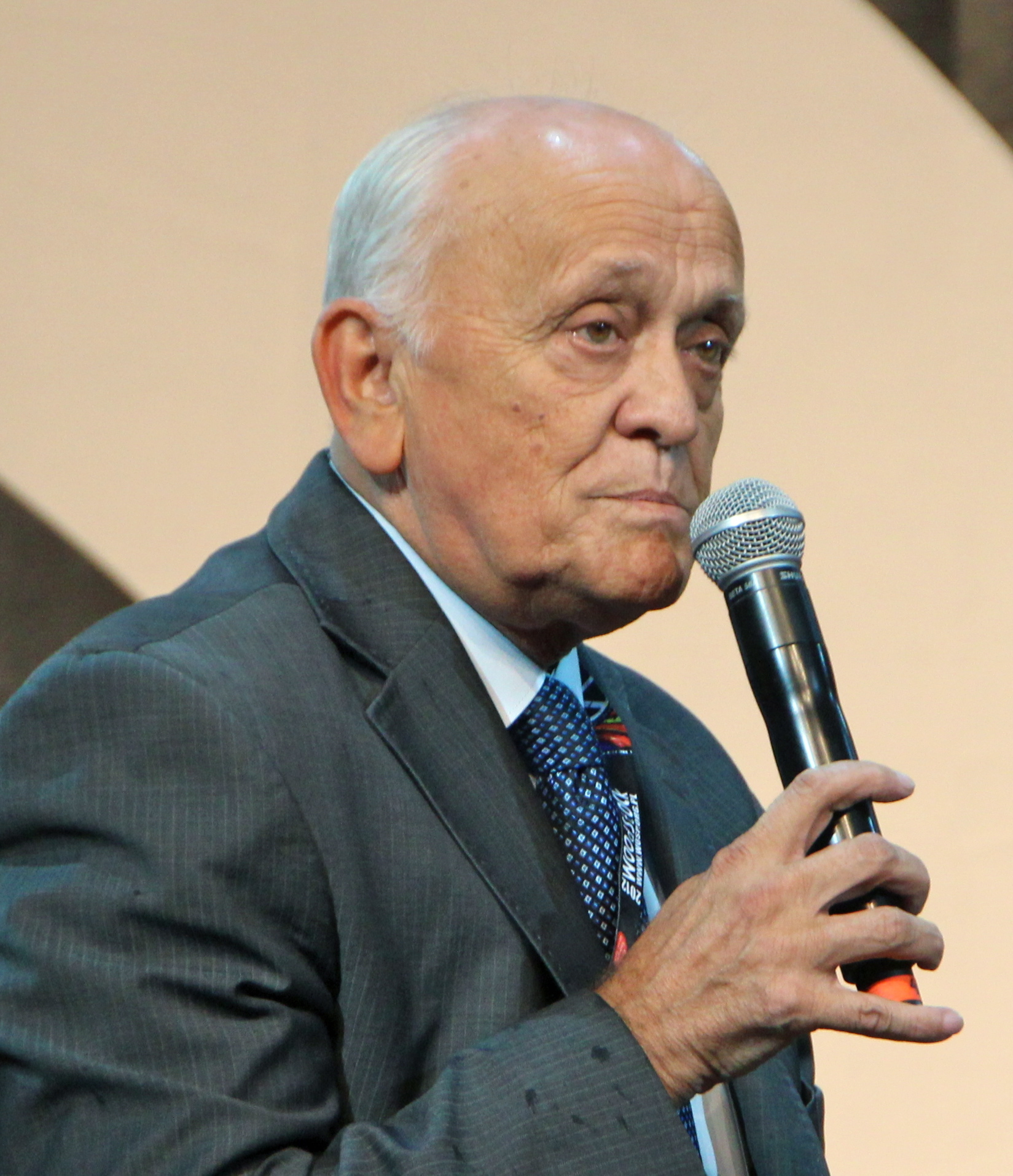
Andrzej Strejlau, head coach from 1984 to 1986

The final against the 1985 champion PAOK, has been recorded as one of the top performances in the history of AEL. The "crimsons" played "total" football, smashed with 4–1 their opponents and eventually came to their first title. However, in the pregame of that fight a common point united the two teams...AEL and PAOK lined up before the referee Makis Germanakos without their two key players (left back Nikos Patsiavouras and top scorer Christos Dimopoulos), since they both had already agreed to sign for Panathinaikos! As for the actual game, on 22 June 1985, on the Athens Olympic Stadium before 30,000 shared fans, AEL seemed to have the upper hand from the start, but completely dominated from the 19', when Vassilakos was expelled by direct red card (hit Adamczyk off-phase) and reached its first goal at 39' with Ziogas, after an attempt by the Polish striker. After the second half κick-off Kmiecik wrote with perfect shot the 2–0 and although PAOK reduced to 55' with Skartados, Andrzej Strejlau's players finished the game at 73' with Ziogas and 75' with Valaoras, teaching modern football while creating a host of missed opportunities. The players who led AEL in its first title in its history were: Plitsis, Parafestas, Kolomitrousis, Galitsios, Mitsibonas, Voutiritsas, Ziogas, Kmiecik, Adamczyk, Andreoudis (87' Tsiolis) Valaoras. The first trophy that was raised to the sky of Athens the previous evening by the team captain Takis Parafestas entered the city the next day escorted by hundreds of cars.

Battles were waiting for AEL in Europe, but failed to proceed, against the Italian Sampdoria. Maybe tired, perhaps it still cost them so much the leaving of their "conductor", the Kazio for the Stuttgart Kickers... His compatriot Janusz Kupcewicz, who replaced him, although came right from the lineup of the 1982 FIFA World Cup in Spain, had injury problems and did not help as much as he could..At that time, the culmination of a transfer thriller, a player who was acquired by Toxotis Larissa and dressed in crimson, making his first professional steps and later called "the magician", Vassilis Karapialis. His own introduction, along with two to three other events, painted the following year, the most indifferent season for AEL that decade. The assumption of command by Stelios Kantonias and the return of Jacek Gmoch in the technical leadership, were guarantees for the offensive of the new season. No paint, but it was stronger than the black of mourning, which darkened the sky of Larissa. 19 years old Vasilis Theodoridis, a PAOK supporter, an hour before the match hurled a fishing flare against the local fans stands which hit the unsuspecting Charalambos Blionas in the carotid arteries. The professor died seconds later. That day, on 26 October 1986, a page was written in the history of Greek football and as though nothing is more important than the loss of a life, just one year later, the city of Larissa has experienced times in which the only team in the Greek region who ever sat on the throne.

==== The "Miracle of 1988": Greek champions ====
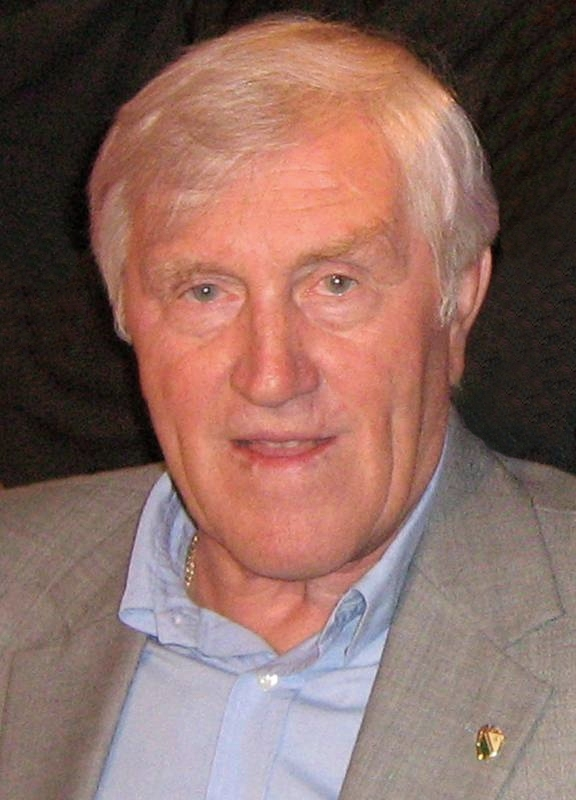
Jacek Gmoch, head coach of the champion team of 1987–88

The non-renewal of contracts of Parafestas and Andreoudis in the summer and the transfer of Plitsis to Olympiacos in December, were options that were not accepted by the fans, but the success of the team in conjunction with the "rising star" of Karapialis, minimized any opposition disposal. Especially when on 16 March 1988 the sports court announced the decision to remove 4 points from AEL because of the famous "doping case" of the Bulgarian striker (with very little participation in the championship), Georgi Tsingov. He was tested positive on the use of the substance Codeine, which is not likely to improve the performance of an athlete at all.. Conspiracy theories quoted around about what really happened, the player claimed that had a flu, others that it was a sabotage. Nevertheless, the whole city of Larissa rose up and in no time created road blocks that cut Greece in two, claiming the right of what the team had won over the football field. The barricades on the national highway lasted 5 whole days until an intervention by the political leadership of sports. They took the decision to restore order, and change the article in question. From 21 March 1988, teams ceased to be considered responsible for each possible doping athlete. AEL however, was largely responsible for the... psychological doping of the fans, which then helped to overcome doubt and anxiety and get proudly in the 87th minute of the penultimate game of the season against Iraklis, when that incredible shot of Mitsibonas hurled into space the enthusiasm of the crowd. AEL completed the 30-match season with 18 victories, seven draws and five defeats, scoring 51 goals and conceding 22. Its total of 43 points placed it three points ahead of runners-up AEK Athens. So far, AEL is the first and only regional team that won the Greek championship.

=== Countdown and "Stone Years" (1996–2003) ===
In this time period, AEL had inconsistent results. Maybe if Xamax had not turned the match at Neuchâtel and not sent by 2–1 in the overtime and the unlucky for the "crimsons" penalty shootout, Champions League would held the name of AEL in its ledger, where reigns the goal of Karapialis which opened the score on the second leg of Switzerland. This was the last presence for AEL in the most prestigious club competition in European football. The fans still believed that the team could stay in the spotlight. The accident was for those who were blurred by the excitement of the moment, and believed that the team could climb even higher and soon demanded the change of ownership. From there, players leaving and coming, administrations changed without long term planning, independently of the intentions of everyone. The fact is that AEL gradually lost its credibility inside and outside stadiums and inevitably led eight years later, in May 1996, to the relegation which was spared in 1991, thanks to the amazing second round course. More generally, although great players such as late Lefter Millos, also unjustly shed, Ştefan Stoica, Paulo Da Silva, David Embé and Vangelis Tsoukalis, wore the shirt and tried to give the team its lost glory, failed nothing more than some effects—flickering, in a prescribed downward spiral that culminated with the painful return to the Second Division after 18 years.

==== 4th National ====
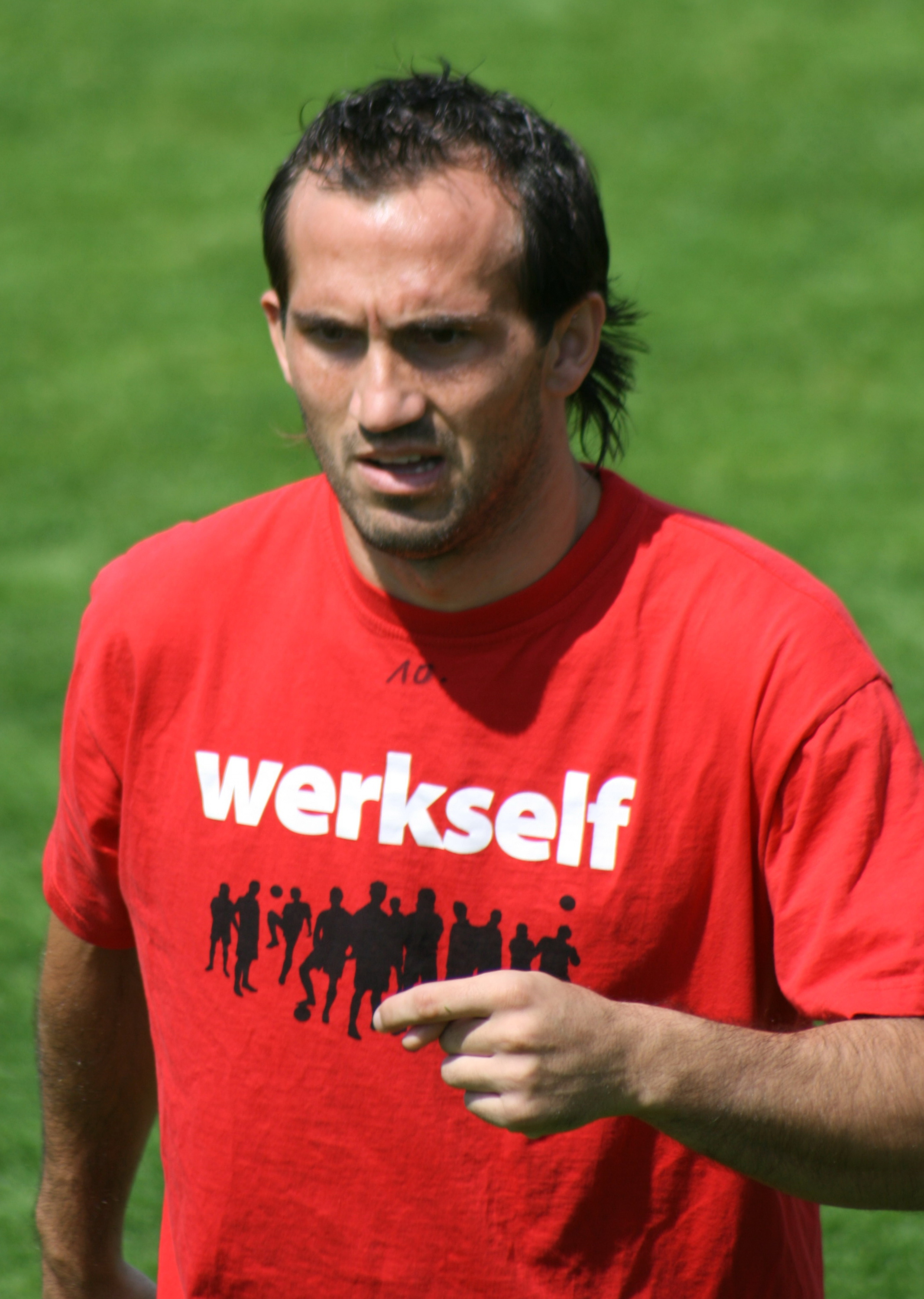
Theofanis Gekas

Summer of 2002: AEL reaches the worst point in its history. Playing again in the third national, almost without administration and money. The team's preparation for the new season was held in the local Alcazar Park (a place with rustic picnic areas, benches and trails, totally unsuitable for professional football training), near the city of Larissa. The first game was held on 25 August 2002 in Kalochori, Thessaloniki, against the local side ILTEX Lykoi. It was the 84th minute of the match, when the 2nd Assistant referee fell down after he was hit in the back, by an object that was thrown from the stands of the guest fans and was taken to the hospital. He claimed that he was unable to continue and the game never finished (The result was 1–1). The team was penalized with −3 points in the league table. Amateur players and volunteers were called to offer their services. The course was naturally very poor and the team risked with the relegation to the 4th National. Halfway through the season appeared on the scene the name of Nikos Sotiroulis, a local businessman who by that time was the club's one and only sponsor. Along with the unforgettable friend, the late Giorgos Katsogiannis and supporting factors of Amateur AEL predominantly Elias Fasoulas and Zissis Helidonis, he fought the first negative judgments and vindicated, when on 8 March 2003 he became the owner of the team with a cost of 116,000 euros in an auction that was held the previous day and in which he was the only candidate! The club a year later, was renamed to AEL 1964 FC (under the special conditions imposed by the law of special clearance) and celebrated its return to the second division. Some months before, on 1 June 2003, the team survived the relegation in the Fourth National and thereby dissolve, in the last game of the championship against Niki Volos, winning 1–0. Although the most crucial and exciting match in the team's history was the one before, that was held in Chania, where the "crimsons" tie 3–3 and stayed alive, condemning the hosts. The new period started then vigorously and with one and only target, the promotion, which was achieved after an exhausting marathon of 38 games... On 30 May 2004, at Alcazar, AEL sealed the second place and the ticket to the higher category (which was virtually and "ironically" ensured by the victory from 1–0 at ILTEX Lykoi just a week before, in the same ground and almost two years after the incident with the Assistant referee), crashing with 5–1 the already "doomed" Pontiakos Nea Santa, while the chant "We are coming back" was rocking the crowded stadium. Coached by Takis Parafestas, with players such as Katsaras, Ziagkas, Kyparissis, Kehagias, Theodosiadis, Kontodimos, Lazorik, Paleologos, and a new upsurge of the fans that followed everywhere, the team persuaded that was really coming back. The one who left, and was the initiator and founder of this effort was Nikos Sotiroulis, who after a few days in mid-June 2004, gave way to the new owner and chairman Kostas Piladakis. A new era had begun.

=== New Age (2004–13): Piladakis years ===
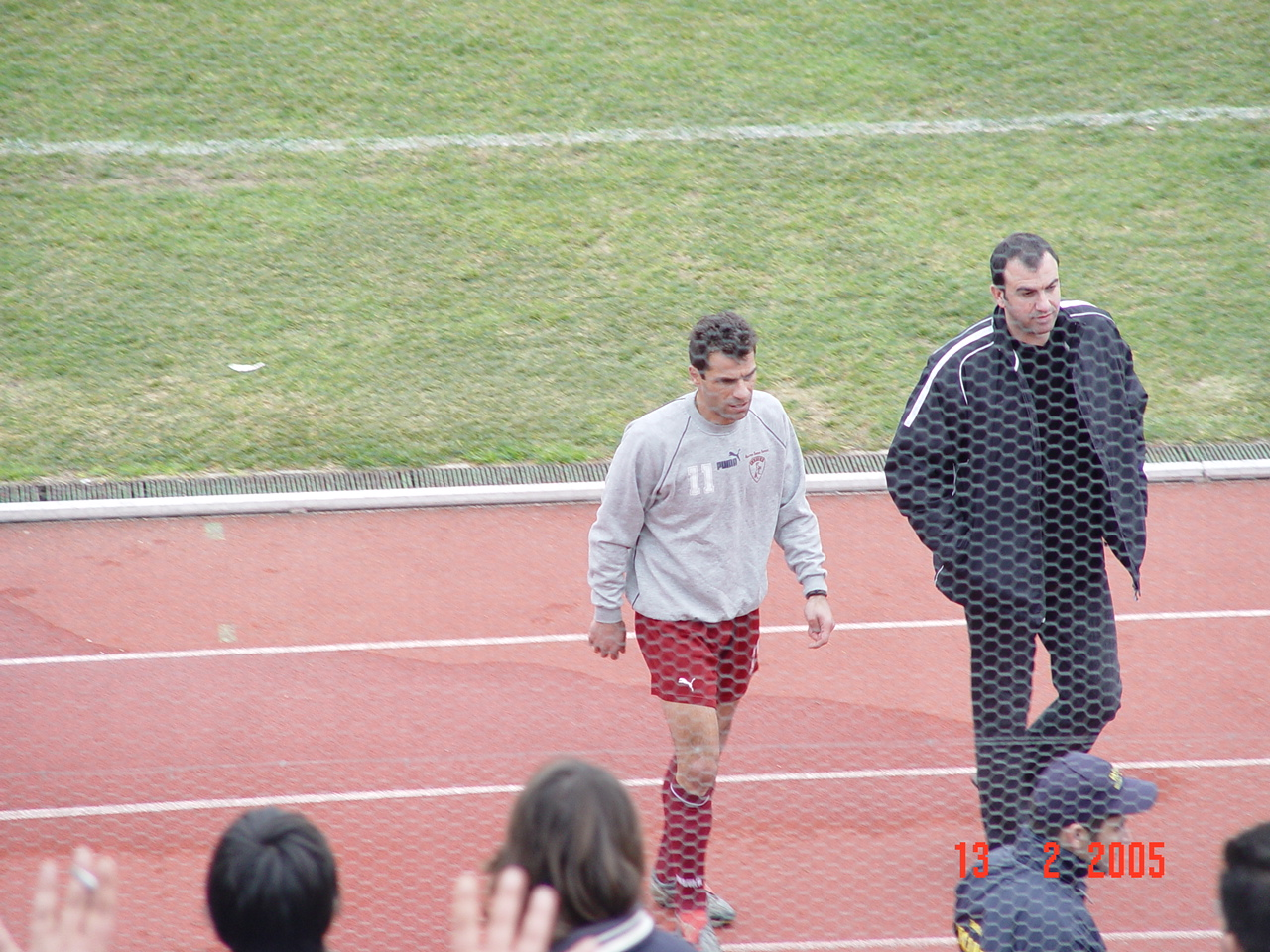
Thomas Kyparissis

Under new management from Georgios Donis, players like striker Thomas Kyparissis led AEL back again in the Super League after nine years of absence. The 19 transfers in the summer of 2004 radically changed the composition of the team and the coach had time to give the team the required homogeneity, starting from 15 May 2005 (Sunday), in Kastoria, (1–1), to Wednesday 25. Except Kyparissis, Papakostas, Ziagkas, Paleologos, Floros and Grigoriou, who continued from the previous season, players such as Christopoulos, Kipouros, the late Bahramis, Gikas, Stournaras, Föerster, Katsiaros, Digozis, Tsiatsios, Makris, Abouna, Nedeljković, Sisic, Giorgos Passios, Chatziliontas, Galitsios, and others, came to add their names to important pages in the team's history. Beside them, stood from summer until December 2004 the first Greek active scorer Alexis Alexandris and a well-known name in European football, the Romanian international midfielder Dennis Şerban, who played in many major teams, top of which was the Spanish Valencia. That same season, while in the 2nd Division, AEL reached to the "8" of the Greek Cup, having ruled in turn Acharnaikos, Apollon Athens, and Chalkidona of the First Division, before being excluded from the "European" Skoda Xanthi, which nevertheless beat 1–0 in the first match of Alcazar.

==== In the elite: Greek Cup winners and European competition ====
In the first year after its return to its division, AEL did the "bang" bringing in the summer of 2005 directly from the English courts, the UEFA Euro 2004 champion and former captain of the Greece national football team, Nikos Dabizas. A move that was made to shield the defense while sending the message that AEL did not return to Super League just to participate in the league, but to star. Along with AEL returned also its supporters, giving "presence" with tours admired throughout Greece. Toumba, Kaftanzoglio, Pankritio, Kleanthis Vikelidis, Zosimades... Comfortably stayed 8th, and a European opportunity occurred through Intertoto Cup, exploiting the weakness of PAOK to fulfill the criteria of UEFA. A European return, with two games against the Turkish Kayserispor did not bring the coveted Cup Qualification to UEFA Cup (within 0–0 draw, and a 2–0 defeat in Kayseri), but it was clearly an omen of a great European return, which was meant to be completed one year later. The 2006–07 season was one of its most successful, but also one of the most controversial in the club's modern history. On the one AEL rose again to the throne of Greek Cup Winners, and on the other flirted with relegation, eventually managing to secure salvation in the last matchday.

===== 2006–07 Greek Cup winners =====
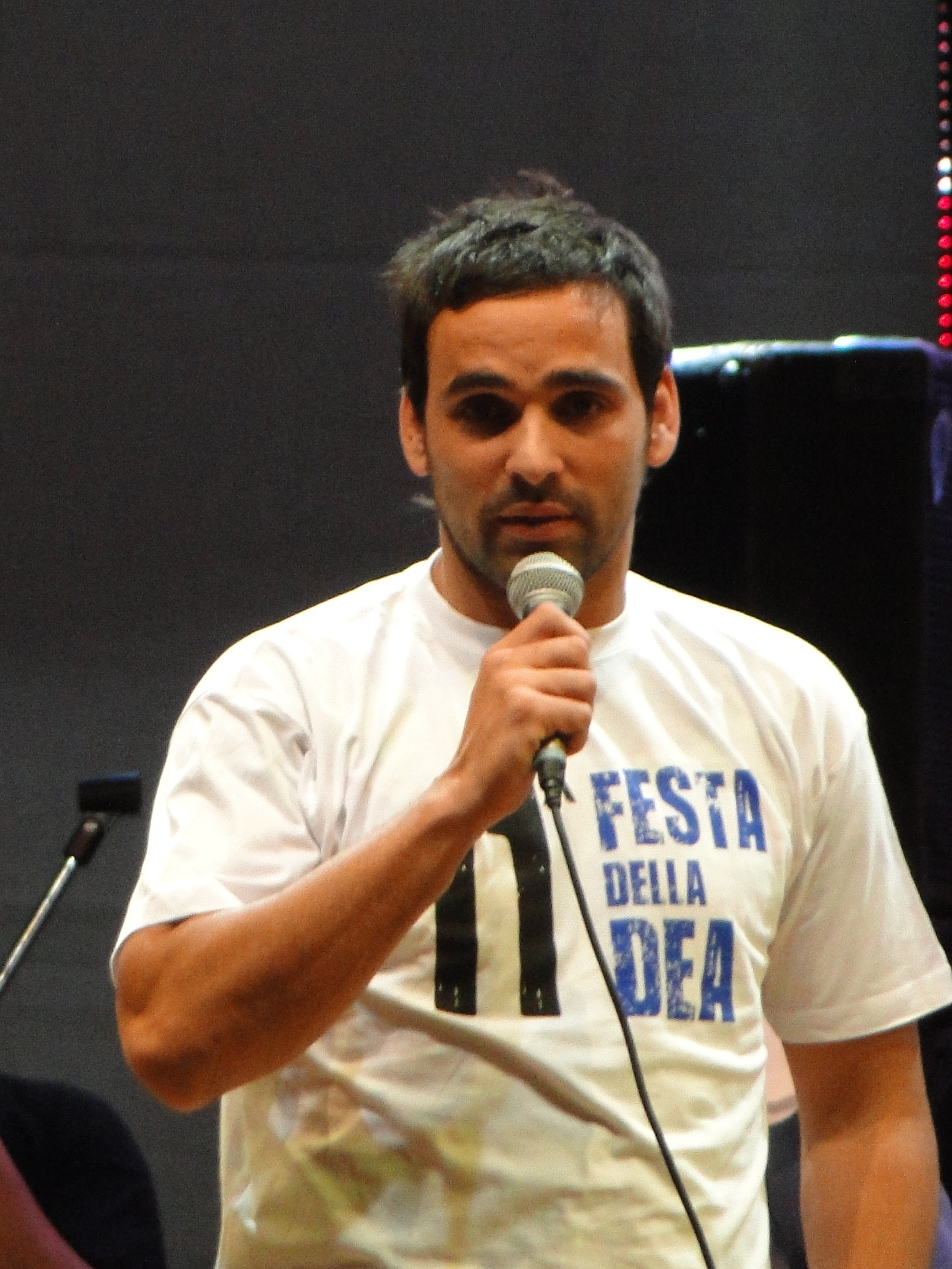
Facundo Parra

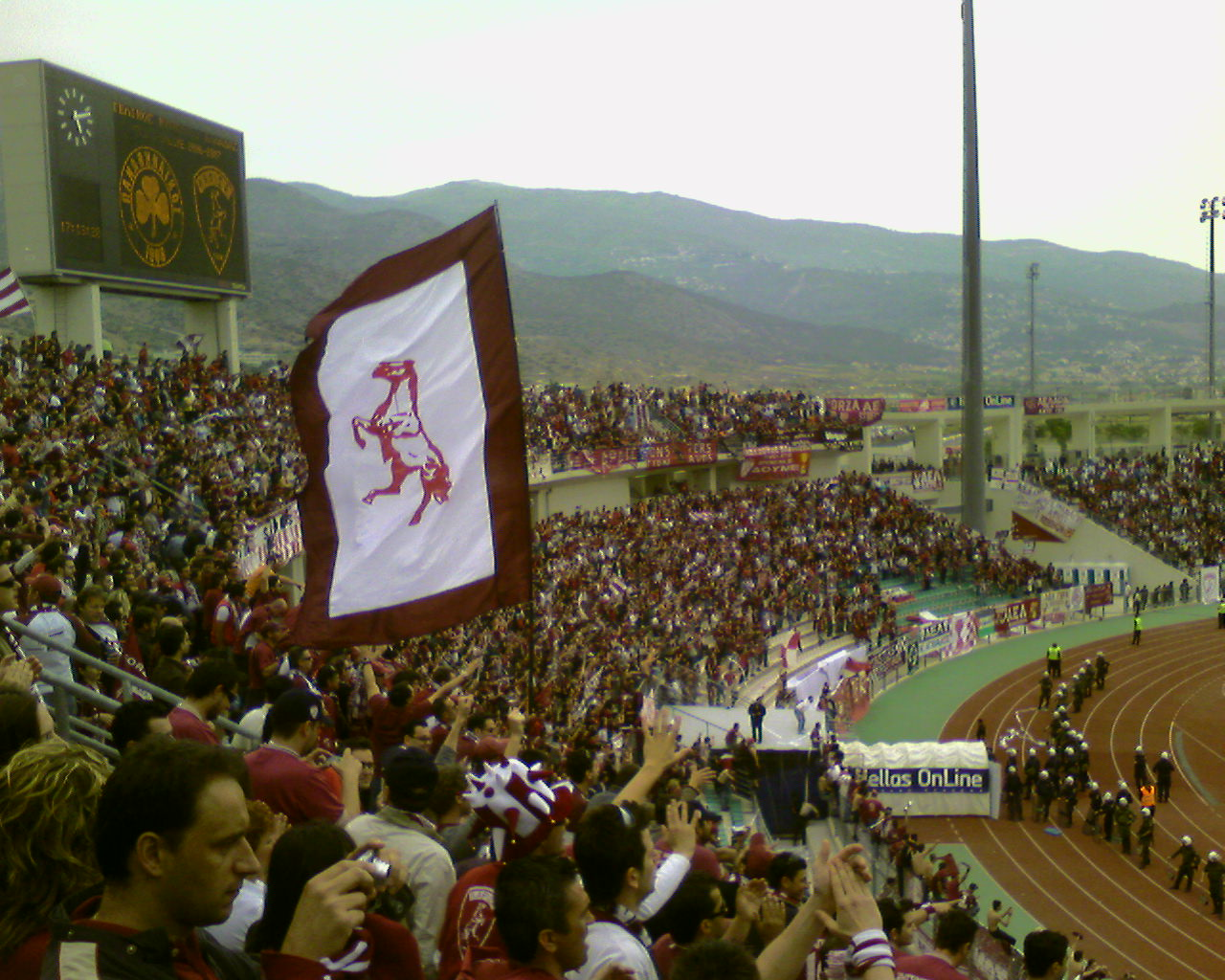
AEL fans during the 2007 Greek Cup final in Panthessaliko Stadium (5 May 2007)

5 May 2007 is now a new landmark in the history of AEL 1964. Georgios Donis and his players brought the Cup "again in Pineios" after 22 years, creating a new benchmark in the glorious march of the team. This is only 5 years after 2002, the lowest point in the club's history. This is the final certificate that AEL returned to the elite of Greek football. Cup in 1985, the 1988 Championship, and a Cup again in 2007 in Volos where the game's MVP Nikos Dabizas and the vice captain, Zissis Ziagkas lifted together the third major trophy in the team's history. Their opponents were Panathinaikos for the third time in a Cup final where the "crimsons" prevailed with 1–2. The match was held in the Panthessaliko Stadium, inside Thessalian "territory". AEL secured beside all other the European participation for the second consecutive year, this time in the UEFA Cup. Jozef Kožlej and Henry Antchouet, took the baton from Ziogas, Kmiecik and Valaoras, signing with their own goals (who had the stamp of Giorgos Fotakis) this new "golden" page. The Slovak striker opened the scoring in just the third minute with a perfect header following a free kick from Fotakis, Papadopoulos equalized with a penalty won by Föerster and masterfully executed in the 44th, however, Antchouet was the player who held the final. In the 83rd minute the "Gabonese Arrow" poured on the offensive after the exemplary deep ball of Fotakis and "thundered" the goalkeeper Ebéde, writing the 1–2 that was meant to be the final score. The final whistle of Kyros Vassaras found over 10,000 fans of the team ecstatically singing "because we have lost our minds, this Cup is ours", giving rise to frantic celebration. The celebration began at Panthessaliko from the awarding of the trophy, continued to Alcazar which opened its gates to welcome the winners and ended in the Central Square of Larissa shortly after midnight.

AEL (Donis): Kotsolis, Galitsios, Venetidis, Dabizas, Föerster, Bassila, Silva Cleyton (85 ' Vallas) Digozis, Aloneftis (74 ' Kalantzis), Fotakis, Kožlej, (60 'Antchouet).

Panathinaikos (Muñoz): Ebéde, Vyntra, Nilsson, (84 ' Šerić), Goumas, Morris, Leontiou, Tziolis (85 ' Bišćan), Ninis (73 ' Romero), Ivanschitz, Papadopoulos, Mantzios.

A week later the "crimsons" had a back-and-forth game culminating in an own goal in the 81st minute, ensuring the victory in Kalamaria with 2–1 against the local Apollon, having at their side the support of over 3000 fans and finishing with a victory in a difficult year.

===== European dream =====
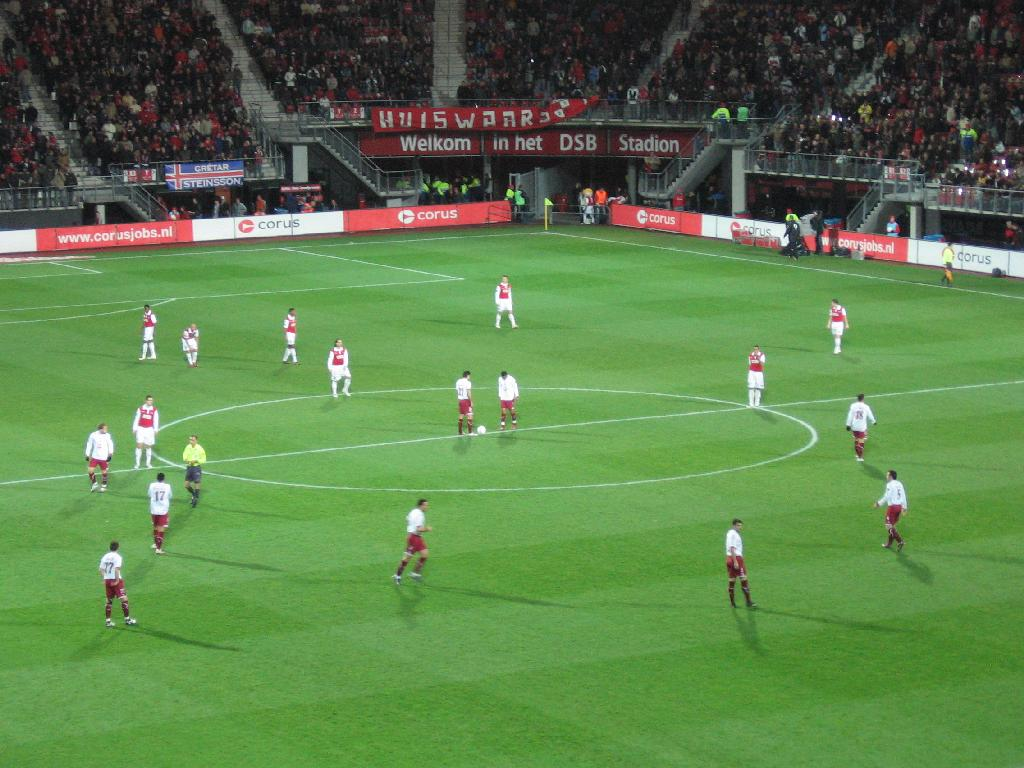
2007–08 UEFA Cup match between AZ Alkmaar and AEL

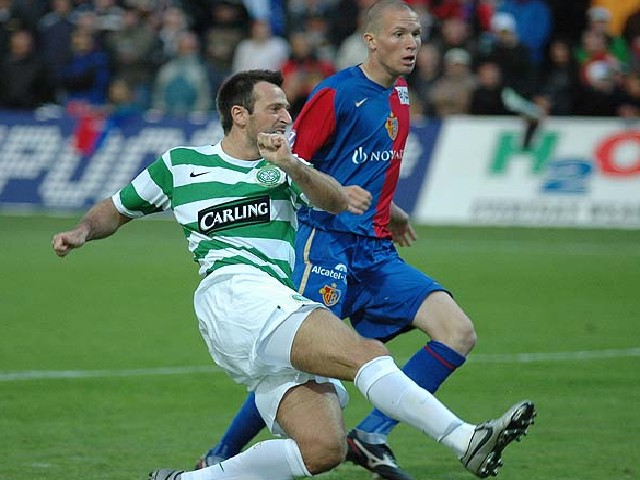
Maciej Żurawski

AEL, as the Cup Winner, represented Greece in the UEFA Cup and the draw brought its technical leader, Georgios Donis, faced with the club in which he started his international football career, English Blackburn Rovers. AEL entered the first qualifying round as the clear underdog, but on the afternoon of 20 September 2007 at the Panthessaliko Stadium—after Alcazar did not comply to the UEFA specifications—won 2–0 in the first match and lost 2–1 in the second game of Ewood Park and took a qualification to the group stage. In the "32" AEL faced teams such as Everton with a long tradition in the Premier League, the Dutch AZ Alkmaar, the German Nürnberg and the subsequent 2008 UEFA Cup winners Russian Zenit Saint Petersburg. The team failed to pick a point in the four games, but won the respect that was confirmed by great European coaches, which AEL found opposite in this journey as Louis van Gaal and Dick Advocaat. Liberated from the burden of European obligations and with the assistance of players such as Maciej Żurawski and Tümer Metin—AEL made a championship course in the second round of the Super League and lost by one goal tie with Panionios the 5th position that led to the playoffs. Successes continued as AEL recorded in 2008–09 one of the most successful years in its modern history. Stayed for 13 consecutive undefeated matches, finished fifth in the Super League and ensured its entry into the play-offs and a European output (in the UEFA Europa League) for the third time in the last four years and for the third time in its history through the championship. It is a year in which AEL—among other things—broke two traditions by winning in Kaftanzoglio Stadium Iraklis for the first time since 1982 and Olympiacos in Karaiskakis Stadium after 26 years.

===== A new Stone Age for the club =====
Two years later, the AEL returned to the second division. Wrong assessments and decisions affected the completion of the team roster, and the leaving of strong players left the AEL. Most notable during this time was the constant chase of the team on the part of arbitration.

Due to the European exclusion from the Icelandic KR Reykjavík related to difficulties within the squad and poor preparation, the summer of 2009 began with some difficulties. The unexpected death of the late Mexican striker Antonio de Nigris on 16 November marked the period. Despite this, the AEL managed to keep its position in the penultimate game of the season, changing coach (Giannis Papakostas in place of Marinos Ouzounidis) and achieved 5 wins out of the last 7 games in the season. The prospect of the entry into the new stadium (the AEL FC Arena) and the feeling that the near-mishap last season created expectations of positive results for the 2010–11 season, accompanied by large investments in player transfers. The transition from the Alcazar Stadium into the newly built AEL FC Arena in late November—early December 2010 was not well received: two defeats by Panionios, (0–1) and PAOK (1–2), negatively affected the festive atmosphere. Above all was the possibility of arbitration, which created a negative atmosphere. Due to numerous difficulties over the first half of the season (for nearly 13 games), many of which shaped scores and results, AEL had an unusually difficult season. In response, changes were made via coaching and trying to strengthen the squad. Ultimately these tactics did not prove successful. AEL finished in the penultimate position and eventually relegated. Later, the revelation of the match fixing scandal that occurred in the early summer of 2011 came to light, but AEL's match results were not changed in response.

=== Recent history ===
After the club's relegation and a final attempt to vindicate without much effort, Piladakis began building the team that would return immediately in the Super League. He hired the experienced and reputable coach in the English grounds Chris Coleman and along with him players of International range like Zequinha, the famous Portuguese midfielder Luís Boa Morte, the Brazilian winger Césinha and many others. The course of the team in the 2011–12 season started with the best omens, but soon all would be reversed. Financial problems that piled, appeared again and eventually led the coach and many of the players to the exit. Rupture between the owner and the organized fans substantially undermined the future of the team. Piladakis resigned and the club without any administration and financial support, deliberately relegated in the 3rd Division. A move that is used by many football teams in Greece and was based in a financial law (special clearance), made to ensure the deletion of the previous debts, as teams that competing in the 3rd Category are considered amateur.

In the summer of 2013, Evangelos Plexidas, a local businessman from Trikala took over and promised immediate return. Although the team indeed promoted relatively easily from the 3rd category and also won the Greek 3rd Category Cup, and the 2013–14 Amateurs' Super Cup many incorrect choices about the team's administration and management were not accepted by the fans. The changing of 6 coaches in a single season (2014–15) and the leaving of almost 15 players (although the team managed to participate in the Football League Play-Offs but failed to promote), created again a poor situation that led the major shareholder in the decision to sell the majority stake of his shares to Alexis Kougias, a well-known Greek lawyer and football administrator in July 2015.

A year later, on 15 May 2016, the team finally gained the promotion into the Super League. In clear contrast with the last time, however, there was little enthusiasm among the fans, as Kougias, a widely divisive figure in Greek society, had longtime conflicts with them as well as the local community and veterans of the team. The first season back in top flight was a difficult one, with 3 managers employed: Sakis Tsiolis left almost immediately after the club's promotion on 2 June 2016, only to return five months later and replace Angelos Anastasiadis who took over after him the previous summer. He managed to keep his place on the bench until 21 March 2017, when he resigned for personal reasons. Thus, despite relative financial stability the team struggled on and off the pitch, yet managed to keep its top flight status by finishing 13th, just above the relegation places. After one match coached by caretaker Theodoros Voutiritsas, Alexis Kougias hired the Dutch André Paus, that managed to stay for seven games in the club's bench. On 14 September 2017 Belgian manager Jacky Mathijssen was announced and signed for the rest of the season. Despite that, 11 days later and after only three games (0–0 home draw with Atromitos a 4–1 away loss against Panionios and a 2–0 loss against Panathinaikos for the Greek Cup) he was fired. Ilias Fyntanis, the club's previous assistant coach returned as a caretaker and Kougias hired the 3rd manager for the ongoing season, Apostolos Mantzios. A day later, Mantzios announced that due to serious personal reasons he cannot take over. Ilias Fyntanis took over as the club's manager, and succeeded to make the team showing a more stable performance. Despite that, on 20 February 2018 he was fired once again and was replaced by the Serbian Ratko Dostanić that had coached the team in the season 2015–16 in the Football League. Ηowever, this new deal did not last for long. In Fact, only three games later, Dostanić resigned after a serious disagreement with the club's owner. Kougias hired the 42-year-old Sotiris Antoniou, himself originating from Agia, Larissa. He made his Super League managerial debut on 1 April 2018, on a 3–0 away defeat against Apollon Smyrnis. The team showed little improvement in the league but still avoided relegation relatively easily. They were also very close to qualification for the club's fifth cup final, but a last-minute goal for semifinal opponents AEK Athens send them through instead on the away goals rule.

== Honours ==
=== Domestic ===
- Super League
  - Winners (1): 1987–88
  - Runners-up (1): 1982–83
- Greek Cup
  - Winners (2): 1984–85, 2006–07
  - Runners-up (2): 1981–82, 1983–84
- Greek Super Cup
  - Runners-up (2): 1988, 2007
- Super League 2
  - Winners (5): 1972–73, 1977–78, 2004–05, 2015–16, 2024–25
  - Runners-up (5): 1971–72, 2014–15, 2021–22, 2022–23, 2023–24
- Super League 2 Super Cup
  - Winners (1): 2025
- Gamma Ethniki
  - Winners (1): 2013–14
  - Runners-up (1): 2003–04
- Gamma Ethniki Cup
  - Winners (1): 2013–14
- Amateurs' Super Cup
  - Winners (1): 2013–14

=== International ===
- UEFA Cup Winners' Cup
  - Quarter-finals (1): 1984–85

== Crest and colours ==
=== Crest evolution ===
The emblem of the club is a wild rising horse (same as the symbol of the city), believed to be an ancient thessalian-breed horse like Alexander the Great's Bucephalus.

=== Colours and kit evolution ===
The team's colours have been crimson and white since the formation of the club in 1964.

First

1964–65	1967–68	1987–88	1991–92	1995–96	2003–04	2008–09	2009–10	2010–11	2014–15	2018–19

Alternative

1975–76	1978–79	1980–81	1994–95	1995–96	1996–97	2006–07	2009–10	2010–11	2016–17	2018–19

== Facilities ==
=== Stadium ===
AEL FC Arena, Aerial view

AEL FC Arena is the home ground of AEL. It is a UEFA 3-star rated stadium and has a seating capacity of 17,118 all covered but it can expand to 33,000 making it the third largest Stadium in Greece. As well as functioning as a football stadium, Arena also operates as a conference centre and music venue. Actual construction of the stadium lasted 14 months, beginning in September 2009 and ended in late November 2010. From May 2013 until September 2015, the team played its home games in the old Alcazar Stadium, due to economic disputes concerning the rent of the stadium between the owning company (Gipedo Larissa AE) and the precedent chairman, Evangelos Plexidas. On 22 July 2015, the club's former major shareholder Alexis Kougias promised in an interview that the team will return and compete for the season 2015–16 in the Arena. Indeed, on 26 August 2015, there was an agreement and an official announcement of the new season's tickets for the stadium. The team competed in AEL FC Arena for five years, (until July 2020) when new financial disagreements and tensions arose, this time between Kougias and the owning company of the stadium. This led to the team leaving AEL FC Arena once again and returning to a fully renovated Alkazar that was scheduled to host the club's games for the next two seasons. On 26 July 2023, there was an official announcement from the club's new owner Achilleas Davelis, that the team will compete once and for all in AEL FC Arena.

=== Training facilities ===
AEL has its own training facilities in the area of the village Dendra, near to the town of Tyrnavos. Those facilities cover over 30,000 square meters, have multisport purposes for all of the team's athletes and among the others include:

- Three football fields (one used by the first team, with 1,500 seats capacity and one for the U21 team's official matches)
- One football field with artificial turf
- Hosting area for the First and Reserves teams
- Gym
- Saunas
- Rooms for tactical purposes
- Press room
- Changing rooms
- Offices
- Parking services

== Supporters ==
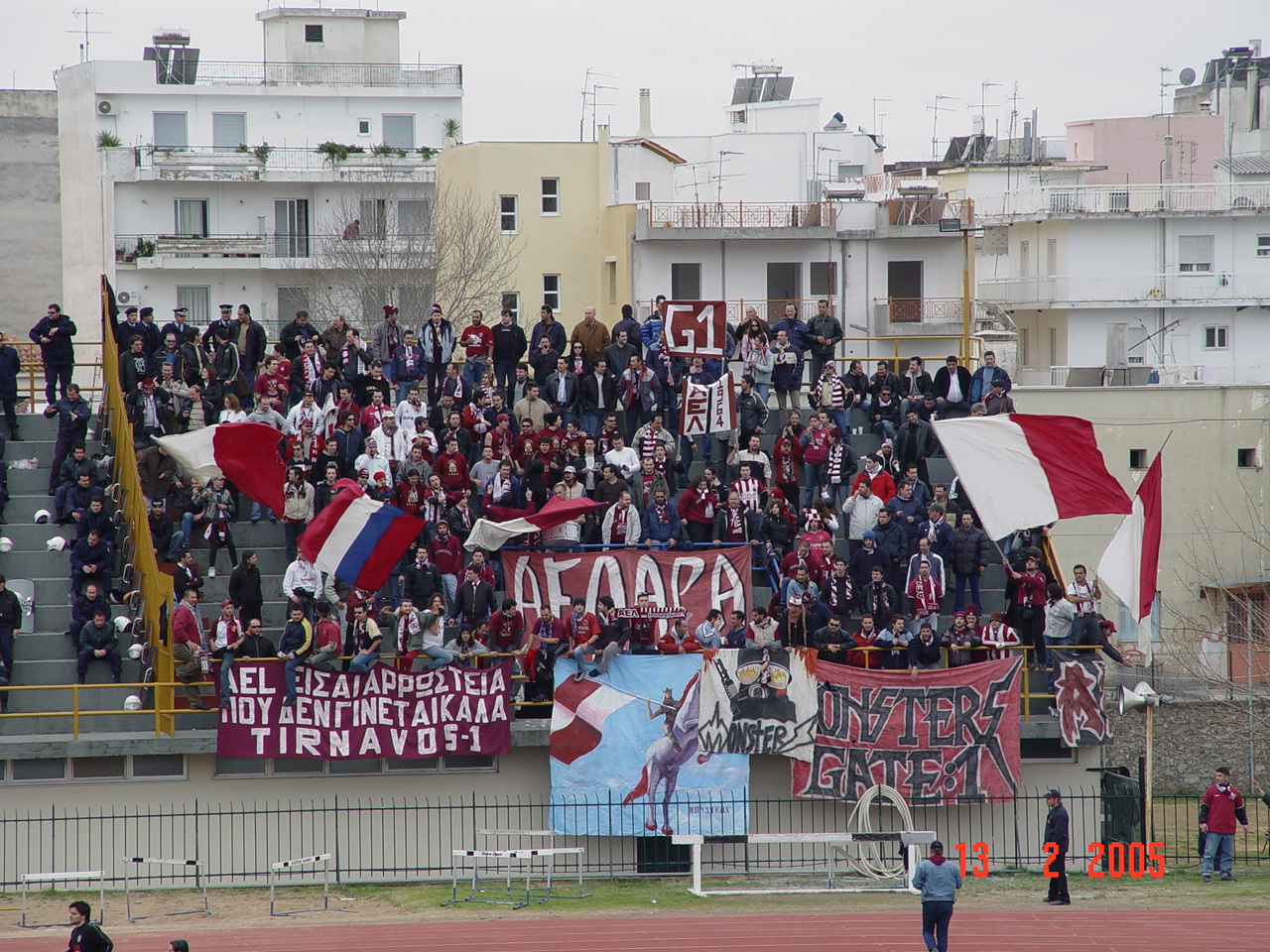
AEL fans in Kalamata during a game in February 2005

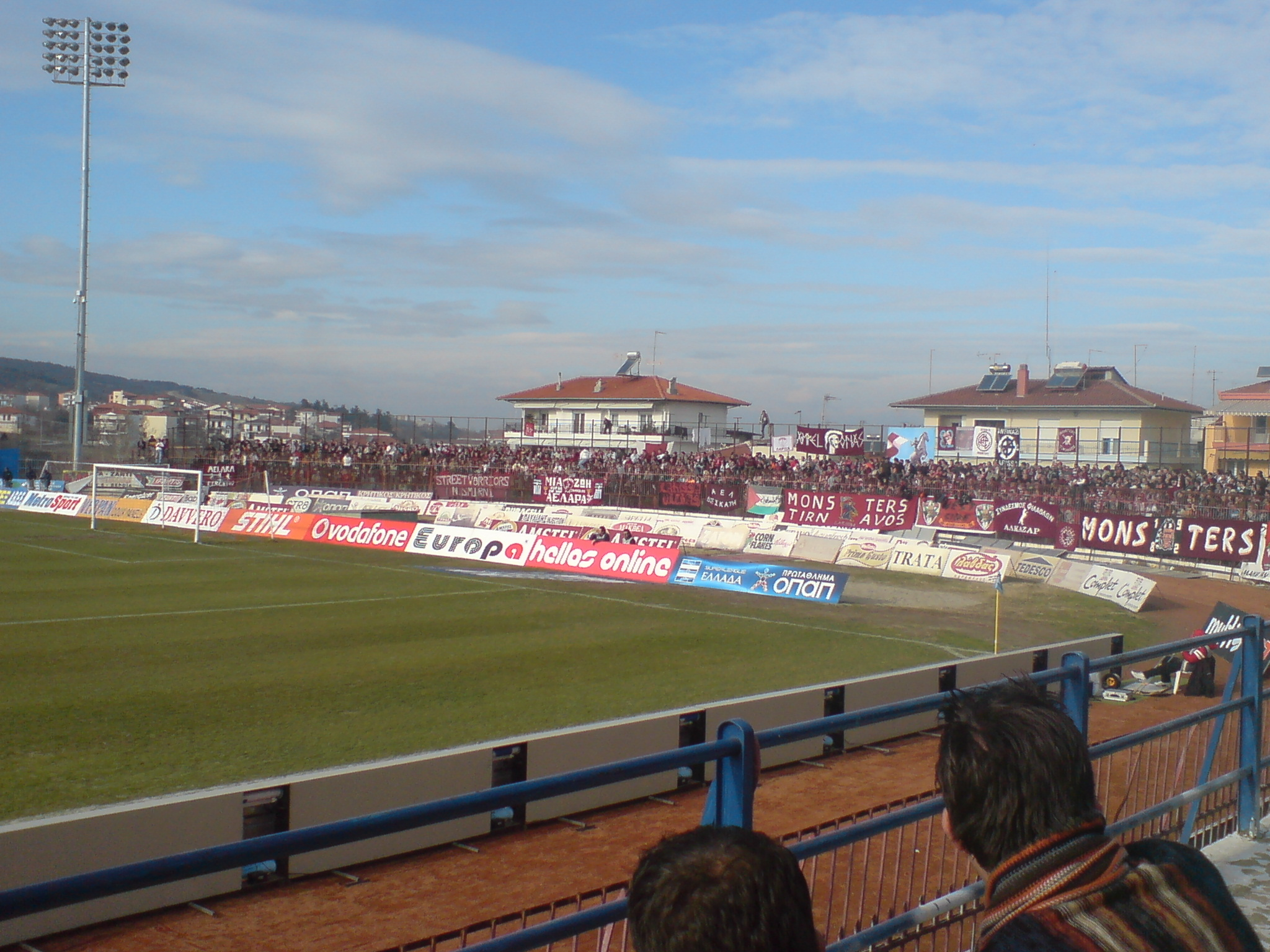
AEL fans in Veria during a game in January 2008

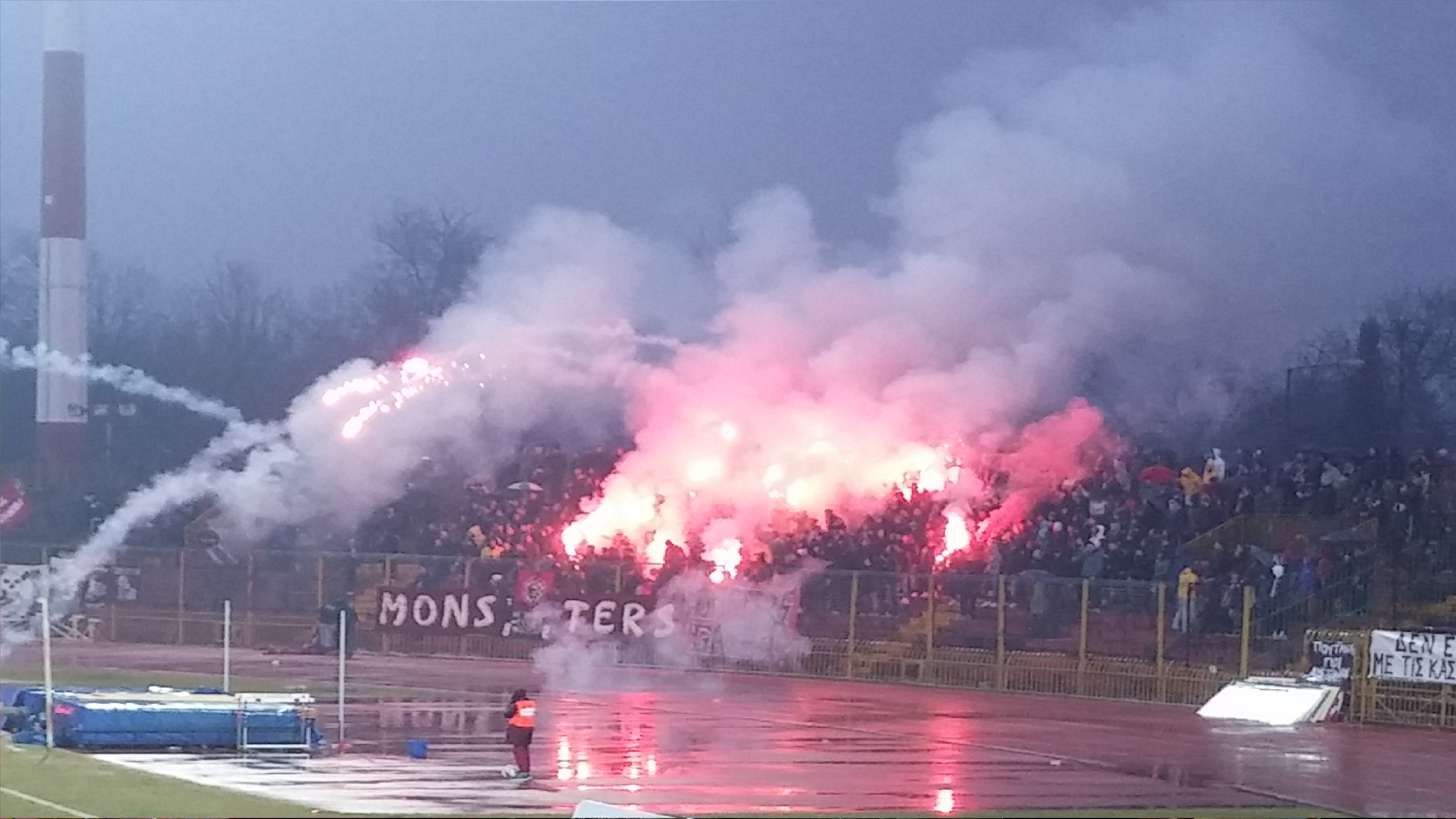
Monsters supporters Club in Alcazar Stadium

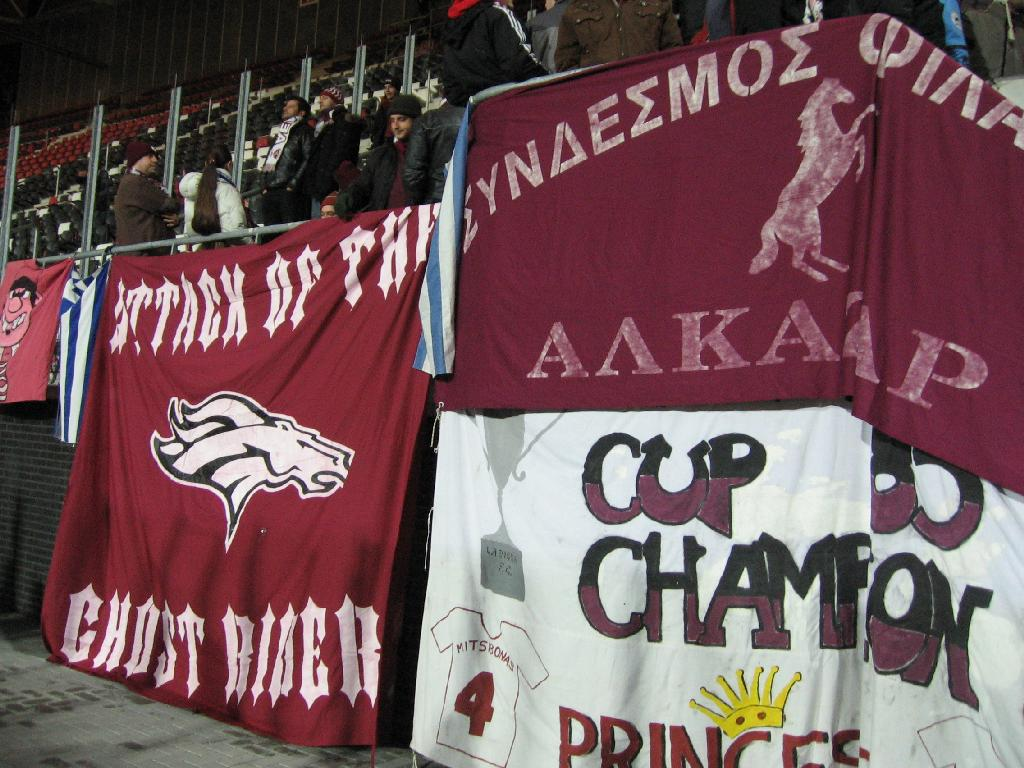
AEL fans in AFAS Stadion in a European game against AZ Alkmaar

Monsters is the largest AEL FC supporters club. The first attempt to organise the team's supporters was made on 31 March 1982 during the game against Diagoras 30 fans that belonged to the older but old-fashioned club Ierolochites gathered in the Gate D of the old Alcazar Stadium that was meant to be the legendary Gate-1 afterwards. Monsters club was formed as an idea of having a true and passionate support to the team without restrictions or boundaries.

The fans tend to use various styles and sizes of banners and flags bearing the name and symbols of their club and have been following the team since the first day everywhere in Greece and Europe.

Monsters have a strong relationship with German team 1. FC Nürnberg's supporter's club called Ultras Nürnberg 1994 or just UN-94. Fans of both clubs often lift banners and create choreography in support of the fellow teams.

S.F. Alkazar (Greek: Σύνδεσμος Φιλάθλων Αλκαζάρ) is the second biggest club of AEL supporters.

== Records ==
- Most Appearances: (Greece) Giannis Galitsios (399)
- Most Goals: (Greece) Giannis Valaoras (73)
- Biggest Home Win: AEL 8–2 Kavala (1981–82)
- Biggest Away Win: Veria 2–5 AEL (1987–88)
- Most Wins in a Season: 18 (1982–83, 1987–88)
- Most Points in a Season: 50 (2008–09)
- Record Home Attendance: AEL 2–1 Panathinaikos (18,493, Alcazar Stadium, 27 December 1987)

All records, counted for the Super League and former Alpha Ethniki championships.

== Players ==
=== Historical squads ===
The 1988 Championship line-up and the 1985, 2007 Cup winning line-ups:

1988 Greek Championship most common starting lineup (4–4–2)

1985 Greek Cup Final starting lineup vs. PAOK (4–3–3)

2007 Greek Cup Final starting lineup vs. Panathinaikos (4–5–1)

=== Current squad ===
As of 29 September 2026

Note: Flags indicate national team as defined under FIFA eligibility rules; some limited exceptions apply. Players may hold more than one non-FIFA nationality.

No.	Pos.	Nation	Player
1	GK	GRE	Nikos Melissas
2	DF	GRE	Georgios Agapakis
3	DF	GRE	Konstantinos Grozos
5	DF	GRE	Timotheos Tselepidis
6	MF	URU	Damián Silva
8	MF	GRE	Konstantinos Papageorgiou (captain)
9	FW	GRE	Athanasios Dabizas
10	MF	GRE	Georgios Konstantakopoulos
11	FW	GRE	Argyris Kampetsis
12	DF	CIV	Ahmed Ouattara Kossonou
14	MF	GRE	Christos Albanis
16	DF	GRE	Michalis Gargalas
17	FW	GRE	Dimitrios Pinakas
18	DF	GRE	Kyriakos Mazoulouxis
19	MF	GRE	Christos Lelekas

No.	Pos.	Nation	Player
20	MF	GRE	Vangelis Nikokyrakis
21	GK	GRE	Theodoros Venetikidis
23	DF	GRE	Michalis Bousis
24	DF	GRE	Giannis Karagiannidis
28	DF	GRE	Alexandros Parras
33	FW	CYP	Andreas Makris
34	GK	GRE	Dimitrios Goumas
37	MF	GRE	Angelos Tsingaras
57	MF	ARG	Luca Andrada (vice-captain)
66	DF	AUT	Emanuel Šakić
74	FW	GRE	Konstantinos Basdekis
77	MF	GRE	Apostolos Kyriakidis
87	FW	GRE	Nikolaos Nitsos
88	DF	GRE	Spyros Risvanis
99	MF	GRE	Nikolaos Ztoupis

=== Youth squad ===
Note: Flags indicate national team as defined under FIFA eligibility rules; some limited exceptions apply. Players may hold more than one non-FIFA nationality.

No.	Pos.	Nation	Player
41	GK	GRE	Aristidis Papapoulias
42	GK	ALB	Erion Bekteshi
43	DF	GRE	Georgios Bouzoukis
44	DF	GRE	Konstantinos Telios
45	DF	ALB	Leandro Cacellari
46	DF	GRE	Kleanthis Kortsari
47	DF	GRE	Stelios Chatzis
48	DF	ALB	Ernesto Malushi
49	DF	GRE	Alexandros Terzis
50	DF	GRE	Nikos Lygouras
51	DF	GRE	Spyros Papakonstantinou
52	MF	GRE	Dimitris Soumpasi
53	MF	GRE	Dimitris Tamposis

No.	Pos.	Nation	Player
54	MF	GRE	Aristidis Elezi
55	MF	GRE	Theodoros-Rafail Drakos
56	MF	GRE	Stelios Siatras
57	MF	GRE	Giannis Meskouris
58	MF	GRE	Pavlos Plakias
59	MF	GRE	Efthymios Mylonas
60	MF	ALB	Bajram Qerimi
61	MF	GRE	Vissarion Drosos
62	MF	GRE	Stavros Pinakas
63	FW	GRE	Alexandros Stamatis
64	FW	GRE	Stavros Kyrizakis
65	FW	GRE	Christos Krikonis

=== Foreign players ===
EU nationals

- (Cyprus) Andreas Makris
- (Austria) Emanuel Šakić

Dual citizenship

Non-EU nationals

- (Argentina) Luca Andrada
- (Ivory Coast) Ahmed Lavrentis Kossonou

=== International players ===
Senior

Under-21

Under-18

- (Greece) Thanasis Papageorgiou

Under-16

- (Greece) Thodoris Venetikidis

== Managerial history ==
- (Serbia) Alexi Petrović (1 July 1964 – 30 June 1965)
- (Greece) Dionysis Minardos (1 July 1965 – 30 June 1966)
- (Greece) Alexandros Vogas (1 July 1966 – 30 June 1967)
- (Greece) Giourkas Seitaridis (1 July 1967 – 30 June 1968)
- (Greece) Lefteris Papadakis (1 July 1968 – 1969)
- (Greece) Theodoros Sirganis (1969)
- (Greece) Giannis Helmis (1969)
- (Greece) Theodoros Sirganis (1969–70)
- (Greece) Apostolos Chabibis (1970)
- (Greece) Christos Kletsas (1970)
- (Greece) Kostas Ziogas (1970)
- (Greece) Giorgos Tsalopoulos (1970)
- (Greece) Kostas Polychroniou (1970 – 30 June 1972)
- (Serbia) Stevan Karanfilović (1 July 1972 – 30 June 1973)
- (Bulgaria) Ivan Kochev (1 July 1973 – 30 June 1974)
- (Greece) Dan Georgiadis (1 July 1974 – 1975)
- (Bulgaria) Ivan Kochev (1975)
- (Greece) Lakis Progios (1975)
- (Argentina) Horacio Morales (1975)
- (Greece) Nikos Alefantos (1975)
- (Argentina) Horacio Morales (1975–76)
- (Greece) Giorgos Petridis (1976)
- (Greece) Giorgos Tsalopoulos (1976)
- (Greece) Antonis Georgiadis (1976–77)
- (Greece) Vangelis Balopoulos (1977)
- (Greece) Pavlos Grigoriadis (1977)
- (Greece) Giannis Zafiropoulos (1977 – 30 June 1978)
- (Bosnia and Herzegovina) Milan Ribar (1 July 1978 – 30 June 1979)
- (Greece) Kostas Polychroniou (1 July 1979 – 30 June 1980)
- (Greece) Antonis Georgiadis (1 July 1980 – 30 June 1982)
- (Poland) Jacek Gmoch (1 July 1982 – 30 June 1983)
- (Austria) Walter Skocik (1 July 1983 – 30 June 1984)
- (Poland) Andrzej Strejlau (1 July 1984 – 31 March 1986)
- (Greece) Nikolaos Tsiakos (1 April 1986 – 30 June 1986)
- (Poland) Jacek Gmoch (1 July 1986 – 2 May 1988)
- (Argentina) Horacio Morales (3 May 1988 – 30 June 1988)
- (Czech Republic) Vladimír Táborský (1 July 1988 – 30 June 1989)
- (Poland) Marcin Bochynek (1 July 1989 – 18 October 1990)
- (Greece) Nikos Alefantos (25 October 1990 – 3 December 1990)
- (Bulgaria) Hristo Bonev (6 December 1990 – 30 June 1993)
- (Poland) Jacek Gmoch (1 July 1993 – 1 November 1993)
- (Greece) Sotiris Koukouthakis (2 November 1993 – 8 November 1993)
- (Greece) Christos Archontidis (9 November 1993 – 30 June 1994)
- (Greece) Vassilis Daniil (1 July 1994 – 30 June 1995)
- (Greece) Ioannis Matzourakis (1 July 1995 – 5 October 1995)
- (Greece) Kostas Siavalas & (Greece) Leonidas Efstathiou (6 October 1995 – 17 October 1995)
- (Greece) Andreas Michalopoulos (18 October 1995 – 30 June 1996)
- (Greece) Giorgos Foiros (1 July 1996 – 27 January 1997)
- (Greece) Kostas Siavalas & (Greece) Dimitris Simeonidis (28 January 1997 – 13 February 1997)
- (Greece) Christos Archontidis (14 February 1997 – 3 March 1997)
- (Greece) Kostas Siavalas & (Greece) Dimitris Simeonidis (4 March 1997 – 30 June 1997)
- (Poland) Kazimierz Kmiecik (1 July 1997 – 10 November 1997)
- (Serbia) Zoran Babović (13 November 1997 – 21 December 1998)
- (Greece) Nikos Argyroulis (24 December 1998 – 26 April 1999)
- (Greece) Paris Meintanis (27 April 1999 – 11 May 1999)
- (Greece) Leonidas Efstathiou (12 May 1999 – 30 June 1999)
- (Greece) Stavros Diamantopoulos (1 July 1999 – 29 August 1999)
- (Serbia) Nebojša Ličanin (30 August 1999 – 7 February 2000)
- (Greece) Takis Parafestas (8 February 2000 – 30 June 2000)
- (Greece) Nikos Argyroulis (1 July 2000 – 26 November 2000)
- (Greece) Giannis Alexoulis (27 November 2000 – 12 February 2001)
- (Greece) Michalis Ziogas (13 February 2001 – 30 June 2001)
- (Greece) Vangelis Vouroukos (1 July 2001 – 7 March 2002)
- (Greece) Kostas Siavalas (8 March 2002 – 30 June 2002)
- (Greece) Takis Sourlatzis (1 July 2002 – 8 September 2002)
- (Greece) Christos Gatas (9 September 2002 – 23 February 2003)
- (Argentina) Horacio Morales (24 February 2003 – 31 March 2003)
- (Greece) Takis Parafestas (1 April 2003 – 30 June 2004)
- (Greece) Georgios Donis (1 July 2004 – 24 April 2008)
- (Greece) Marinos Ouzounidis (1 July 2008 – 22 February 2010)
- (Greece) Giannis Papakostas (23 February 2010 – 29 November 2010)
- (Greece) Kostas Katsaras (caretaker) (30 November 2010 – 16 December 2010)
- (Norway) Jørn Andersen (17 December 2010 – 9 January 2011)
- (Greece) Nikos Kostenoglou (10 January 2011 – 30 June 2011)
- (Wales) Chris Coleman (1 July 2011 – 9 January 2012)
- (Greece) Nikos Kotsovos (caretaker) (10 January 2012 – 16 January 2012)
- (Montenegro) Božidar Bandović (17 January 2012 – 30 January 2012)
- (Greece) Nikos Kehagias (31 January 2012 – 20 March 2012)
- (Greece) Michalis Ziogas (21 March 2012 – 8 January 2013)
- (Greece) Timos Kavakas (9 January 2013 – 30 June 2013)
- (Greece) Kostas Panagopoulos (12 August 2013 – 10 November 2013)
- (Greece) Giorgos Strantzalis (12 November 2013 – 8 March 2014)
- (Greece) Panagiotis Tzanavaras (9 March 2014 – 30 June 2014)
- (Greece) Alekos Vosniadis (1 July 2014 – 5 September 2014)
- (Greece) Kostas Panagopoulos (6 September 2014 – 1 November 2014)
- (Greece) Thomas Grafas (2 November 2014 – 23 December 2014)
- (Greece) Sakis Anastasiadis (caretaker) (24 December 2014 – 5 January 2015)
- (Greece) Panagiotis Tzanavaras (6 January 2015 – 7 March 2015)
- (Greece) Soulis Papadopoulos (8 March 2015 – 30 June 2015)
- (Serbia) Ratko Dostanić (10 July 2015 – 22 February 2016)
- (Greece) Sakis Tsiolis (23 February 2016 – 2 June 2016)
- (Greece) Angelos Anastasiadis (8 June 2016 – 31 October 2016)
- (Greece) Sakis Tsiolis (1 November 2016 – 21 March 2017)
- (Greece) Theodoros Voutiritsas (caretaker) (22 March 2017 – 2 April 2017)
- (Netherlands) André Paus (3 April 2017 – 12 September 2017)
- (Belgium) Jacky Mathijssen (14 September 2017 – 25 September 2017)
- (Greece) Ilias Fyntanis (26 September 2017 – 19 February 2018)
- (Serbia) Ratko Dostanić (20 February 2018 – 10 March 2018)
- (Greece) Sotiris Antoniou (12 March 2018 – 22 September 2018)
- (Italy) Gianluca Festa (24 September 2018 – 30 June 2019)
- (Serbia) Gordan Petrić (1 July 2019 – 8 August 2019)
- (Greece) Michalis Grigoriou (9 August 2019 – 22 November 2020)
- (Greece) Giannis Tatsis (23 November 2020 – 20 January 2021)
- (Italy) Gianluca Festa (21 January 2021 – 9 May 2021)
- (Greece) Michalis Ziogas (caretaker) (10 May 2021 – 23 May 2021)
- (Greece) Kostas Frantzeskos (24 May 2021 – 13 October 2021)
- (Greece) Ilias Fyntanis (14 October 2021 – 22 December 2021)
- (Greece) Panagiotis Goutsidis (23 December 2021 – 28 April 2022)
- (Greece) Sotiris Antoniou (3 May 2022 – 18 July 2022)
- (Greece) Panagiotis Goutsidis (18 July 2022 – 23 December 2022)
- (Greece) Giannis Taousianis (23 December 2022 – 14 March 2023)
- (Greece) Panagiotis Goutsidis (14 March 2023 – 2 October 2023)
- (Greece) Pavlos Dermitzakis (7 October 2023 — 17 September 2024)
- (Greece) Alekos Vosniadis (18 September 2024 — 15 April 2025)
- (Greece) Giorgos Petrakis (1 July 2025 — 5 October 2025)
- (Greece) Stelios Malezas (7 October 2025 — 7 December 2025)
- (Greece) Savvas Pantelidis (8 December 2025 — 23 April 2026)
- (Italy) Gianluca Festa (23 April 2026 — 30 June 2026)
- (Greece) Sokratis Ofrydopoulos (15 July 2026 — present)

== Competition history ==
=== European competitions ===
Season	Competition	Round	Opponent	Home	Away	Aggregate
1981–82	Balkans Cup	1st Round	(Albania) 17 Nëntori Tirana	3–1	0–3	3–4
1983–84	UEFA Cup	1st Round	(Hungary) Budapest Honvéd	2–0	0–3 (a.e.t.)	2–3
1984–85	UEFA Cup Winners' Cup	1st Round	(Hungary) Siófok Bányász SK	2–0	1–1	3–1
1984–85	UEFA Cup Winners' Cup	2nd Round	(Switzerland) Servette FC	2–1	1–0	3–1
1984–85	UEFA Cup Winners' Cup	Quarterfinal	(Soviet Union) Dynamo Moscow	0–0	0–1	0–1
1985–86	UEFA Cup Winners' Cup	1st Round	(Italy) Sampdoria	1–1	0–1	1–2
1988–89	European Cup	1st Round	(Switzerland) Neuchâtel Xamax	2–1	1–2 (0–3 p)	3–3
2006	UEFA Intertoto Cup	3rd Round	(Turkey) Kayserispor	0–0	0–2	0–2
2007–08	UEFA Cup	1st Round	(England) Blackburn Rovers	2–0	1–2	3–2
2007–08	UEFA Cup	Group Stage (Group A)	(England) Everton	–	1–3	5th
2007–08	UEFA Cup	Group Stage (Group A)	(Russia) Zenit St. Petersburg	2–3	–	5th
2007–08	UEFA Cup	Group Stage (Group A)	(Netherlands) AZ Alkmaar	–	0–1	5th
2007–08	UEFA Cup	Group Stage (Group A)	(Germany) 1. FC Nürnberg	1–3	–	5th
2009–10	UEFA Europa League	2nd Qual. Round	(Iceland) KR Reykjavík	1–1	0–2	1–3

=== UEFA Champions League all-time club ranking ===
As of 26 May 2021

Rank	Team	Points
246	(Israel) Maccabi Tel Aviv	4
247	(Greece) AEL	3
248	(Georgia (country)) Dinamo Tbilisi	3

=== League and cup history ===
Season	Tier	League	Rank	Win–Draw–Lost	Goals	Points	Biggest Win	Cup
1964–65	II	Beta Ethniki	5th	15–4–11	34–30	64	AEL 4–0 Apollon Larissa	—
1965–66	II	Beta Ethniki	3rd	15–9–6	39–30	69	AEL 4–2 Chalkida	—
1966–67	II	Beta Ethniki	10th	10–10–12	38–45	62	AEL 4–0 Kozani	—
1967–68	II	Beta Ethniki	14th	9–8–13	33–42	55	AEL 5–3 Lamia	1R
1968–69	II	Beta Ethniki	17th	11–4–19	37–43	60	AEL 5–0 Edessaikos	—
1969–70	II	Beta Ethniki	13th	9–11–14	34–45	63	AEL 3–0 Orestis Orestiada	—
1970–71	II	Beta Ethniki	4th	15–15–4	39–25	79	AEL 4–0 Aris Agios Konstantinos	1R
1971–72	II	Beta Ethniki	2nd	26–6–6	71–25	96	AEL 5–0 Makedonikos	1R
1972–73	II	Beta Ethniki	1st ↑	27–6–5	68–19	98	Petralona 0–5 AEL	1R
1973–74	I	Alpha Ethniki	9th	11–10–13	31–40	32	AEL 3–1 Apollon Athens	3R
1974–75	I	Alpha Ethniki	18th ↓	5–7–22	24–59	17	AEL 4–1 Kastoria	3R
1975–76	II	Beta Ethniki	5th	15–12–11	58–42	42	AEL 5–1 Xanthi	3R
1976–77	II	Beta Ethniki	3rd	19–8–11	63–40	46	AEL 6–0 Panthrakikos	1R
1977–78	II	Beta Ethniki	1st ↑	25–9–4	58–17	59	Makedonikos 1–4 AEL	3R
1978–79	I	Alpha Ethniki	12th	15–5–19	34–53	29	AEL 2–0 Panserraikos	1R
1979–80	I	Alpha Ethniki	8th	13–8–13	33–44	34	AEL 3–0 Iraklis	QF
1980–81	I	Alpha Ethniki	6th	14–9–11	42–40	37	AEL 6–2 Kastoria	1R
1981–82	I	Alpha Ethniki	10th	12–7–15	40–38	31	AEL 8–2 Kavala	RU
1982–83	I	Alpha Ethniki	2nd	18–9–7	54–27	45	AEL 5–1 Ethnikos Piraeus	1R
1983–84	I	Alpha Ethniki	6th	13–6–11	28–29	32	AEL 3–0 Ethnikos Piraeus	RU
1984–85	I	Alpha Ethniki	6th	14–7–9	55–35	35	AEL 5–0 Panionios	W
1985–86	I	Alpha Ethniki	8th	12–6–12	36–31	30	AEL 3–0 OFI	1R
1986–87	I	Alpha Ethniki	9th	10–5–15	24–31	25	AEL 3–1 OFI	QF
1987–88	I	Alpha Ethniki	1st	18–7–5	51–22	43	Veria 2–5 AEL	SF
1988–89	I	Alpha Ethniki	6th	10–14–6	37–34	34	AEL 4–0 Panionios	SF
1989–90	I	Alpha Ethniki	8th	12–10–12	35–38	34	AEL 3–0 Apollon Kalamaria	QF
1990–91	I	Alpha Ethniki	12th	10–9–15	38–46	29	Giannina 0–3 AEL	QF
1991–92	I	Alpha Ethniki	8th	11–9–14	40–46	31	AEL 4–0 Panionios	GS
1992–93	I	Alpha Ethniki	7th	11–10–13	36–42	43	AEL 5–2 Panachaiki	QF
1993–94	I	Alpha Ethniki	10th	11–9–14	45–53	42	AEL 5–0 Panionios	QF
1994–95	I	Alpha Ethniki	11th	11–7–16	41–46	40	AEL 6–1 Xanthi	QF
1995–96	I	Alpha Ethniki	16th ↓	9–7–18	32–64	37	AEL 4–1 Panachaiki	2R
1996–97	II	Beta Ethniki	6th	15–10–9	44–32	55	AEL 5–2 Apollon Kalamarias	2R
1997–98	II	Beta Ethniki	9th	11–13–10	37–42	46	AEL 3–0 Edessaikos	1R
1998–99	II	Beta Ethniki	8th	13–7–14	45–47	46	AEL 4–1 Apollon Kalamarias	3R
1999–00	II	Beta Ethniki	6th	16–7–11	55–39	55	Anagennisi Karditsa 1–7 AEL	GS
2000–01	II	Beta Ethniki	15th ↓	8–6–16	28–41	30	AEL 2–0 Panelefsiniakos	GS
2001–02	III	Gamma Ethniki	7th	12–6–12	37–34	42	AEL 4–1 Ethnikos Piraeus	GS
2002–03	III	Gamma Ethniki	15th	11–13–14	33–40	43	AEL 3–0 Chania	1R
2003–04	III	Gamma Ethniki	2nd ↑	24–5–9	58–34	77	AEL 5–1 Pontiakos Nea Santa	1R
2004–05	II	Beta Ethniki	1st ↑	17–7–6	56–25	58	AEL 6–0 Atromitos	QF
2005–06	I	Alpha Ethniki	8th	10–9–11	31–37	39	AEL 4–1 Apollon Kalamarias	SF
2006–07	I	Super League	10th	9–9–12	30–38	36	AEL 3–0 Ionikos	W
2007–08	I	Super League	6th	11–12–7	35–30	45	AEL 5–1 OFI	QF
2008–09	I	Super League	5th	12–13–5	36–26	49	AEL 3–0 Thrasyvoulos	5R
2009–10	I	Super League	8th	10–7–13	31–42	37	Panionios 0–3 AEL	4R
2010–11	I	Super League	14th ↓	5–10–15	29–47	25	AEL 3–0 Skoda Xanthi	5R
2011–12	II	Football League	10th	11–10–13	38–29	43	AEL 5–2 Anagennisi Epanomi	4R
2012–13	II	Football League	9th ↓	16–15–9	42–25	63	AEL 5–0 Fokikos	3R
2013–14	III	Gamma Ethniki	1st ↑	23–4–3	87–14	73	AEL 6–0 Keravnos Thesprotiko	—
2014–15	II	Football League	2nd	14–3–7	27–11	45	AEL 4–0 Ethnikos Serres	1R
2015–16	II	Football League	1st ↑	24–6–4	49–15	78	AEL 3–0 AO Chania	2R
2016–17	I	Super League	13th	6–10–14	23–42	28	AEL 2–0 Panionios	GS
2017–18	I	Super League	12th	7–10–13	22–41	31	AEL 4–2 Panetolikos	SF
2018–19	I	Super League	10th	8–10–12	26–34	34	AEL 4–2 Panionios	5R
2019–20	I	Super League	9th	8–12–13	32–42	36	AEL 3–0 Xanthi	5R
2020–21	I	Super League	14th ↓	6–9–18	25–47	27	Apollon Smyrnis 0–2 AEL	1R
2021–22	II	Super League 2	2nd	19–10–3	42–15	67	AEL 4–0 Xanthi	6R
2022–23	II	Super League 2	2nd	18–4–6	50–19	58	AEL 5–0 Diagoras	5R
2023–24	II	Super League 2	2nd	16–11–3	48–26	59	AEL 3–0 AEK Athens B	6R
2024–25	II	Super League 2	1st ↑	20–6–0	58–15	66	AEL 5–0 PAS Giannina	4R
2025–26	I	Super League	13th ↓	5–15–16	34–56	30	Panserraikos 0–2 AEL; Volos 0–2 AEL	GS
2026–27	II	Super League 2						

Key: 1R = First Round, 2R = Second Round, 3R = Third Round, 4R = Fourth Round, 5R = Fifth Round, 6R = Sixth Round, GS = Group Stage, QF = Quarter-finals, SF = Semi-finals, RU = Runner-up, W = Winner.

- Point system: 1959–60 to 1972–73: 3–2–1. 1973–74 to 1991–92: 2–1–0. 1992–93 onwards: 3–1–0.
- In the season 2012–13 the team gained 63 points but was penalized due to financial problems (−18 points in the final table) and finished 13th.

== League total ==
*including 2025–26

Tier	League	Seasons	Games	Win	Draw	Lost	Goals	GD	Win %
1st	1st division	32	1,033	337	287	410	1,111–1,300	–168	33.30
details	Super League	11	342	87	117	139	324–445	–100	26.80
details	Alpha Ethniki (defunct)	21	691	250	170	271	787–855	–68	36.17
2nd	2nd division	26	832	394	211	227	1,133–769	+364	47.36
details	Super League 2	4	90	53	25	12	140–60	+80	58.88
details	Football League (defunct)	4	132	65	34	33	156–80	+76	49.24
details	Beta Ethniki (defunct)	18	610	276	152	182	837–629	+208	45.24
3rd	Gamma Ethniki	4	136	70	28	38	215–122	+93	51.47

(Leagues created in Greece in 1962–63)

== European competitions ==
As of July 2009

Competition	Seasons	Games	Win	Draw	Lost	Goals	GD	Win %
Balkans Cup	1	2	1	0	1	3–4	–1	50.00
UEFA Cup Winners' Cup	2	8	3	3	2	7–5	+2	37.50
UEFA Champions League	1	2	1	0	1	3–3	0	50.00
UEFA Intertoto Cup	1	2	0	1	1	0–2	–2	0.00
UEFA Cup	2	8	2	0	6	7–12	–5	25.00
UEFA Europa League	1	2	0	1	1	1–3	–2	0.00
Total	8	24	7	5	12	21–29	–8	29.16

== Club staff ==
Executive Board
Owner	(Greece) Zisis Stilianos
President	(Greece) Konstantinos Kleisaris
Vice-President	(Greece) Asterios Nakas
Board Member	(Greece) Tasos Christakopoulos
Board Member	(Greece) Lampros Ioakim
Board Member	(Greece) Eleftheria Karkanta
Chief Financial Officer	(Greece) Aglaia Naka
Marketing & PR Manager	(Greece) Apostolis Dailianis
Security Μanager	(Greece) Giannis Kotroutsos
Amateur AEL President	(Greece) Lampros Ioakim
Press Representative	(Greece) Christos Gatzoulis
Contractors
Ticket Manager	(Greece) Kostas Kontos
First Team Staff
Head coach	(Greece) Sokratis Ofrydopoulos
Assistant coach	(Greece) Nikos Manarolis
Goalkeepers coach	(Greece) Vasilios Laskaris
Fitness coach	(Greece) Panagiotis Kourkounas
Rehabilitation trainer	(Greece) Vangelis Tzaxristos
Analyst	(Greece) Alexandros Psylias
Technical Director	(Greece) Makis Belevonis
Team Manager	(Greece) Giorgos Delizisis
General Director	(Greece) Sotirios Kyrgiakos
Scout	(Greece) Petros Kariatoglou
Head Doctor	(Greece) Giorgos Basdekis
Head Physiotherapist	(Greece) Dimitris Kretsavos
Physiotherapist	(Greece) Dimosthenis Pitsilkas
Physiotherapist	(Greece) Anastasios Paparsenos
Caretaker	(Greece) Kostas Tsareas
Youth Teams & Academy Coaching Staff
Academy technical Director	(Greece) Kostas Tsotsos
Academy goalkeeping coach	(Greece) Charis Minogiannis
Academy Fitness coach	(Greece) Iraklis Mantziokas
Academy Dietitian Nutritionist	(Greece) Katerina Tsolaki
Academy Psychologist	(Greece) Dora Tzatzaki
Academy General Scout	(Greece) Nikos Argyroulis
U-19 Head coach	(Greece) Spyros Plakias
U-19 Assistant coach	(Greece) Apostolos Katsianos
U-17 Head coach	(Greece) Giorgos Loules
U-17 Fitness coach	(Greece) Vangelis Tzachristos
U-15 head coach	(Greece) Apostolis Evangelou
Caretaker	(Greece) Spyros Theocharidis

== Presidents ==
At the founding of the club and under the administration of a 15-member council, composed of club representatives and organizations of the city, Konstantinos Tzovaridis was appointed as the first president. The current president, Achilleas Ntavelis, is AEL's 31st president with several presidents having multiple spells in office (counted separately).

No.	President	Years	Achievements
1	(Greece) Konstantinos Tzovaridis	1964–1966	
2	(Greece) D. Paliouras	1966–1967	
3	(Greece) K. Kostarelos	1967	
4	(Greece) L. Daniil	1967–1968	
5	(Greece) D. Karanastasis	1968–1969	
6	(Greece) Nikolaos Gretsis	1969–1970	
7	(Greece) Athanasios Hasiotis	1970–1971	
8	(Greece) Antonis Kantonias	1971–1973	Promotion to Alpha Ethniki (1972–73)
9	(Greece) Michalis Kittas	1973–1975	
10	(Greece) Ilias Kelesidis	1975–1977	
11	(Greece) Stavros Tourlakopoulos	1977–1979	Promotion to Alpha Ethniki (1977–78)
12	(Greece) Antonis Kantonias	1979–1980	
13	(Greece) Simos Paleochorlidis	1980–1982	Cup runners-up (1981–82)
14	(Greece) Adamos Tsiachas	1982–1984	Alpha Ethniki runners-up (1982–83); Cup runners-up (1983–84)
15	(Greece) Kostas Samaras	1984–1986	Cup winners (1984–85)
16	(Greece) Stelios Kantonias	1986–1990	Championship (1987–88); Super Cup runners-up (1988)
17	(Greece) Kostas Samaras	1990–1993	
18	(Greece) Nikos Papanikolaou	1993–1999	
19	(Greece) Giorgos Batatoudis	1999–2001	
20	(Greece) Giorgos Adamopoulos	2001–2002	
21	(Greece) AEL Amateurs	2002–2003	
22	(Greece) Nikos Sotiroulis	2003–2004	Promotion to Beta Ethniki (2003–04)
23	(Greece) Kostas Piladakis	2004–2013	Promotion to Alpha Ethniki (2004–05); Cup winners (2006–07); Super Cup runners-up (2007)
24	(Greece) Evangelos Plexidas	2013–2014	Promotion to Football League (2013–14); Gamma Ethniki Cup winners (2013–14); Amateurs' Super Cup winners (2013–14)
25	(Greece) Achilleas Pavlopoulos	2014	
26	(Greece) Sotirios Plexidas	2014–2015	
27	(Greece) Alexis Kougias	2015–2016	Promotion to Super League (2015–16)
28	(Greece) Andreas Liontos	2016–2018	
29	(Greece) Sotiris Markou	2018–2020	
30	(Greece) Alexis Kougias	2020–2022	
32	(Greece) Achilleas Ntavelis	2022–2025	Promotion to Super League 1 (2024–25)
33	(Greece) Giannis Ntavelis	2025–2026	
34	(Greece) Konstantinos Kleisiaris	2026–	

== Kit manufacturers and sponsorship ==
Period	Kit manufacturer	Shirt sponsor
1964–65	unknown	none
1965–66	unknown	none
1966–67	unknown	none
1967–68	unknown	none
1968–69	unknown	none
1969–70	unknown	none
1970–71	unknown	none
1971–72	unknown	none
1972–73	unknown	none
1973–74	unknown	none
1974–75	unknown	none
1975–76		none
1976–77		none
1977–78		none
1978–79		none
1979–80		none
1980–81		none
1981–82		none
1982–83		BIOKARPET
1983–84		BIOKARPET
1984–85		
1985–86		CAMEL ADVENTURES
1986–87		BIOKARPET
1987–88		
1988–89		BIOKARPET
1989–90		
1990–91		
1991–92
1992–93		
1993–94
1994–95		
1995–96

Period	Kit manufacturer	Shirt sponsor
1996–97		
1997–98
1998–99		
1999–00		
2000–01		ΕΙΚΟΝΑ-ΗΧΟΣ
2001–02		ΟΙΚΟΣ ΜΙΣΣΙΑΣ
2002–03		ΟΙΚΟΣ ΜΙΣΣΙΑΣ
2003–04		ΟΙΚΟΣ ΜΙΣΣΙΑΣ
2004–05		ΥΔΡΟΓΕΙΟΣ INSURANCE
2005–06		ΓΑΛΑΞΙΑΣ INSURANCE
2006–07		
2007–08		
2008–09		
2009–10
2010–11		ΠΑΜΕ ΣΤΟΙΧΗΜΑ
2011–12		ΠΡΟΤΟ
2012–13		ΠΡΟΤΟ
2013–14		Καλλάς-Παπαδόπουλος Food Company
2014–15		ΤΖΟΚΕΡ
2015–16		ΠΑΜΕ ΣΤΟΙΧΗΜΑ
2016–17		none
2017–18		none
2018–19		ΘΡΑΚΗΣ ΓΕΥΣΕΙΣ
2019–20		ΘΡΑΚΗΣ ΓΕΥΣΕΙΣ
2020–21		ΘΡΑΚΗΣ ΓΕΥΣΕΙΣ
2021–22		ΥΦΑΝΤΗΣ ΑΛΛΑΝΤΙΚΑ - ΘΡΑΚΗΣ ΓΕΥΣΕΙΣ
2022–23		ANIMUS Medical Group
2023–24		SOLIS Constructions
2024–25		NOVIBET
2025–26		NOVIBET
2026–27		NOVIBET

=== Current sponsorships ===
- Main Shirt Sponsor: NOVIBET
- Back Shirt Sponsor: AEGEAN COLLEGE
- Shorts Sponsor: TΑΧΙΝΙ ΟΛΥΜΠΟΣ
- Official Sport Clothing Manufacturer: Erima
- Great Sponsor: Auto Tsogias
