= Giannis Galitsios =

Greek footballer

Personal information
- Full name: Ioannis Galitsios
- Date of birth: 15 May 1958 (age 68)
- Place of birth: Larissa, Greece
- Height: 1.84 m (6 ft 0 in)
- Position: Centre-back

Senior career*
| Years | Team | Apps | (Gls) |
| 1979–1993 | AEL | 399 | (10) |
| 1993–1995 | Trikala | 23 | (1) |
| Total | | 422 | (11) |

International career
| 1982–1984 | Greece | 17 | (0) |
- * Club domestic league appearances and goals

Giannis Galitsios (Greek: Γιάννης Γκαλίτσιος; born 15 May 1958) is a Greek former professional footballer who played as a centre-back.

== Club career ==
Galitsios played only for AEL, in 399 official League games (holding the team's all-time appearance record) and he is considered to be one of the club's best ever. He is also the longest serving captain in club's history. Galitsios is also a retired professional firefighter.

Giannis' son Georgios Galitsios is also a footballer, having played for K.S.C. Lokeren Oost-Vlaanderen after spending four years at AEL.

== International career ==
Galitsios appeared in 17 matches for the senior Greece national football team from 1982 to 1984.

== Honours ==
AEL

- Greek Championship: 1987–88
- Greek Cup: 1984–85
