= Georgios Plitsis =

Greek footballer

Personal information
- Date of birth: 10 August 1963 (age 63)
- Place of birth: Larissa, Greece
- Position: Goalkeeper

Youth career
- 1975-1978: Larisaikos

Senior career*
Years	Team	Apps	(Gls)
1980–1988	AEL	151	(0)
1988	Olympiacos	11	(0)
1988–1996	Iraklis	156	(0)
1996–1997	Lamia		
1997–1998	Apollon Larissa		
Total		318	(0)

International career
1982–1991	Greece	20	(0)
- * Club domestic league appearances and goals

Georgios Plitsis (born 10 August 1963) is a former football goalkeeper. He played for AEL, Olympiacos and Iraklis.

== International career ==
Plitsis appeared in 20 matches for the senior Greece national football team from 1982 to 1991.

== Career statistics ==
=== International ===
Appearances and goals by national team and year
National team	Year	Apps	Goals
Greece	1982	2	0
Greece	1983	2	0
Greece	1984	6	0
Greece	1985	1	0
Greece	1986	3	0
Greece	1987	–	
Greece	1988	–	
Greece	1989	3	0
Greece	1990	2	0
Greece	1991	1	0
Total		20	0

== Honours ==
AEL

- Greek Cup: 1984–85
