= Theodoros Voutiritsas =

Greek footballer

Personal information
- Date of birth: 27 July 1962 (age 64)
- Place of birth: Larissa, Greece
- Height: 1.68 m (5 ft 6 in)
- Position: Midfielder

Team information
- Current team: Atromitoi Larissas (manager)

Youth career
- 1979-1993: AEL

Senior career*
Years	Team	Apps	(Gls)
1979–1993	AEL	319	(26)
1993–1994	Apollon Kalamarias		

International career
1984–1989	Greece	7	(0)

Managerial career
- 2006-: Atromitoi Larissas
- * Club domestic league appearances and goals

Theodoros Voutiritsas (Greek: Θεόδωρος Βουτιρίτσας; born 27 July 1962) is a Greek former professional football player. He played only for AEL for all of his career.

Voutiritsas wrote history while wearing the club's jersey, being one of the team's golden generation of players. During the 1980s, AEL won both the National Cup and the Greek League with a team consisting almost entirely of local football talents and Voutiritsas being one of them. He was the master of the team's midfield and the brain of the team, since most offensive plays began at his feet. He was famous for his ability to use both of his legs with equal skill and quality.

He is currently involved in scouting for young talents. Furthermore, he also owns a Football Academy in his hometown, Larissa. He also acted as Assistant Manager of AEL for a period of almost a year recently.

== Managerial statistics ==
Updated 2 April 2017

Team	From	To	Record				
Team	From	To	G	W	D	L	Win%
(Greece) AE Larissa	22 March 2017	2 April 2017	1	0	0	1	00.00
Career total			1	0	0	1	00.00

== International career ==
Voutiritsas appeared in seven matches for the senior Greece national football team from 1984 to 1989.
