= Giannis Valaoras =

Greek footballer

Personal information
- Full name: Ioannis Valaoras
- Date of birth: 23 May 1958 (age 68)
- Place of birth: Larissa, Greece
- Height: 1.77 m (5 ft 10 in)
- Position: Forward

Youth career
- 1976–1978: Anthoupoli Larissa

Senior career*
Years	Team	Apps	(Gls)
1978–1992	AEL	346	(102)
1992	Trikala	13	(4)
Total		359	(106)

International career
1980–1985	Greece	4	(0)
- * Club domestic league appearances and goals

Giannis Valaoras (Greek: Γιάννης Bαλαώρας; born 23 May 1958) is a Greek former footballer who played as a forward during the 1980s and early 1990s. He played for AEL and Trikala He captained the team on various occasions, and celebrated both the Greek Championship and the Greek Cup during his time at AEL.

Valaoras also made 4 appearances for the Greece national football team.

== Honours ==
AEL

- Greek Cup: 1984–85
- Alpha Ethniki: 1987–88
