= 1987–88 PAOK FC season =

PAOK
1987–88 season
- President: Charis Savvidis
- Manager: Thijs Libregts; Michalis Bellis
- Stadium: Toumba Stadium
- Alpha Ethniki: 3rd
- Greek Cup: 2nd round
- Top goalscorer: League: Bannon, Borbokis (9); All: Bannon, Borbokis (9)
- Highest home attendance: 36,305 vs Panathinaikos

The 1987–88 season was PAOK Football Club's 61st in existence and the club's 29th consecutive season in the top flight of Greek football. The team entered the Greek Football Cup in first round.

== Players ==
=== Squad ===
Note: Flags indicate national team as defined under FIFA eligibility rules; some limited exceptions apply. Players may hold more than one non-FIFA nationality.

No.	Pos.	Nation	Player
—	GK	GRE	Giannis Gitsioudis
—	GK	GRE	Apostolos Terzis
—	DF	GRE	Nikos Alavantas (captain)
—	DF	GRE	Apostolos Tsourelas
—	DF	GRE	Charis Baniotis
—	DF	GRE	Kostas Malioufas
—	DF	GRE	Nikos Karageorgiou
—	DF	GRE	Dimitris Mitoglou
—	DF	GRE	Michalis Leontiadis
—	DF	GRE	Antonis Mavreas
—	DF	GRE	Giannis Tsiplakis
—	DF	GRE	Giannis Psarras
—	DF	GRE	Nikos Triantafyllidis

No.	Pos.	Nation	Player
—	MF	GRE	Georgios Skartados
—	MF	GRE	Thomas Singas
—	MF	GRE	Lakis Papaioannou
—	MF	GRE	Kyriakos Alexandridis
—	MF	GRE	Sotiris Mavromatis
—	MF	GRE	Kostas Lagonidis
—	MF	GRE	Paschalis Seretis
—	FW	IRL	Paul Bannon
—	FW	GRE	Stefanos Borbokis
—	FW	GRE	Aris Karasavvidis
—	FW	GRE	Michalis Iordanidis
—	FW	YUG	Nikola Nikić
—	FW	GRE	Asterios Roussomanis

== Transfers ==
Transferred in

Transfer Window	Pos.	Name	Club	Fee
Summer	MF	(Greece) Paschalis Seretis	(Greece) Xanthi	Loan return
Summer	MF	(Greece) Kostas Lagonidis	(Greece) Xanthi	?
Summer	FW	(Republic of Ireland) Paul Bannon	(Netherlands) NAC Breda	10 million Dr.
Summer	FW	(Socialist Federal Republic of Yugoslavia) Nikola Nikić	(Greece) Aris	Free
Winter	DF	(Greece) Giannis Tsiplakis	(Greece) Pandramaikos	?
Winter	DF	(Greece) Michalis Leontiadis	(Greece) Pandramaikos	?
Winter	DF	(Greece) Antonis Mavreas	(Greece) Kalamata	?
Winter	DF	(Greece) Nikos Triantafyllidis	(Greece) Pontioi Veria	?

Transferred out

Transfer Window	Pos.	Name	Club	Fee
Summer	GK	(Greece) Takis Pantelis	(Greece) Panionios	Free
Summer	DF	(Socialist Federal Republic of Yugoslavia) Ivan Jurišić		Released
Summer	MF	(Greece) Peter Skouras	(Greece) Diagoras	Free
Summer	MF	(Greece) Vassilis Vasilakos	(Greece) AEK Athens	10 million Dr.
Winter	DF	(Greece) Giannis Psarras	(Greece) Panachaiki	Free
Winter	DF	(Greece) Charis Baniotis	(Greece) Olympiacos	80 million Dr.
Winter	Mgr.	(Netherlands) Thijs Libregts	(Greece) Olympiacos	20 million Dr.

== Pre-season ==
Win Draw Loss

27 July 1987 Friendly	Anagennisi Chalkidona	1–8	PAOK	Chalkidona
			Skartados; Iordanidis; Karasavvidis; Mitoglou; Siggas; Papaioannou

1 August 1987 Friendly	NAC Breda	0–0 (7–8 p)	PAOK	Netherlands
	Penalties
			(penalty scored) Papaioannou; (penalty scored) Tsourelas; (penalty scored) Psarras; (penalty scored) Baniotis; (penalty scored) Borbokis; (penalty scored) Siggas; (penalty scored) Skartados; (penalty scored) Karageorgiou

2 August 1987 Friendly	QPR	1–0	PAOK	Netherlands

4 August 1987 Friendly	ADO Den Haag	2–1	PAOK	Netherlands

8 August 1987 Friendly	Deventer	0–0	PAOK	Netherlands

9 August 1987 Friendly	FC Volendam	5–1	PAOK	Netherlands
			Karasavvidis

11 August 1987 Friendly	Alfen	2–2	PAOK	Netherlands

14 August 1987 Friendly	Doxa Perivolaki	0–12	PAOK	Perivolaki
			Borbokis; Papaioannou; Alexandridis; Mitoglou; Iordanidis; Karasavvidis; Karageorgiou; Nikić

17 August 1987 Friendly	PAOK	1–2	Aris	Thessaloniki
	Papaioannou 57'		Gioukoudis 32'; Dimitriadis 58'	Stadium: Kaftanzoglio Stadium

19 August 1987 Friendly	PAOK	3–0	Levadiakos	Thessaloniki
	Bannon 12'; Karasavvidis 63', 67'			Stadium: Toumba Stadium

23 August 1987 Friendly	Panathinaikos	4–2	PAOK	Athens
	Dimopoulos 1', 25' (pen.), 37'; Rocha 69'		Skartados 22' (pen.); Karasavvidis 27'	Stadium: Athens Olympic Stadium; Referee: Giannopoulos

28 August 1987 Friendly	PAOK	4–1	Apollon Kalamaria	Thessaloniki
	Karasavvidis 40'; Skartados 51' (pen.); Seretis 68'; Iordanidis 76'		Tsalkitzis 23'	Stadium: Kaftanzoglio Stadium; Referee: Kantartzis

30 August 1987 Friendly	PAOK	3–1	PAONE	Thessaloniki
	Iordanidis 37'; Siggas 38'; Alexandridis 81'		Kagakis 51'	Stadium: Toumba Stadium; Referee: Dakos (1st half), Grigoriadis (2nd half)

== Competitions ==
=== Overview ===
Competition	Record							
Competition	Pld	W	D	L	GF	GA	GD	Win %
Alpha Ethniki	30	17	5	8	60	27	+33	56.67
Greek Cup	3	2	0	1	4	4	+0	66.67
Total	33	19	5	9	64	31	+33	57.58

Source: Competitions

=== Managerial statistics ===
Head coach	From	To	Record							
Head coach	From	To	G	W	D	L	GF	GA	GD	Win %
(Netherlands) Thijs Libregts	Start of season	06.12.1987	11	6	2	3	23	12	+11	54.55
(Greece) Michalis Bellis	20.12.1987	End of season	22	13	3	6	41	19	+22	59.09

== Alpha Ethniki ==
=== Standings ===
Pos	Team	Pld	W	D	L	GF	GA	GD	Pts	Qualification or relegation
1	AEL (C)	30	18	7	5	51	22	+29	43	Qualification for European Cup first round
2	AEK Athens	30	15	10	5	51	31	+20	40	Qualification for UEFA Cup first round
3	PAOK	30	17	5	8	60	27	+33	39	Qualification for UEFA Cup first round
4	OFI	30	17	3	10	54	41	+13	37	
5	Panathinaikos	30	15	6	9	47	34	+13	36	Qualification for Cup Winners' Cup first round

Source: RSSSF
Rules for classification: 1st points; 2nd head-to-head points; 3rd head-to-head goal difference; 4th decision match.
(C) Champions

==== Results summary ====
Overall								Home						Away					
Pld	W	D	L	GF	GA	GD	Pts	W	D	L	GF	GA	GD	W	D	L	GF	GA	GD
30	17	5	8	60	27	+33	56	12	2	1	42	9	+33	5	3	7	18	18	0

Last updated: 15 May 1988.
Source: Competitive matches

==== Results by round ====
Round	1	2	3	4	5	6	7	8	9	10	11	12	13	14	15	16	17	18	19	20	21	22	23	24	25	26	27	28	29	30
Ground	H	A	H	A	H	A	H	A	A	H	A	H	A	H	A	A	H	A	H	A	H	A	H	H	A	H	A	H	A	H
Result	D	D	W	L	W	L	W	L	W	W	W	W	W	W	D	L	W	L	W	W	W	L	L	W	L	W	W	W	D	D
Position	9	8	4	7	3	6	6	7	7	7	4	3	3	3	2	3	3	4	4	4	3	4	4	4	4	4	4	2	3	3

Source: League matches
A = Away; H = Home; W = Win; D = Draw; L = Loss

==== Matches ====
Win Draw Loss

6 September 1987 1	PAOK	2–2	AEK Athens	Thessaloniki
	Bannon 12'; Karasavvidis 74'		Vasilakos 5'; Nielsen 83'	Stadium: Toumba Stadium; Attendance: 33,243; Referee: Koukoulakis

13 September 1987 2	Panionios	1–1	PAOK	Athens
	Mavros 66'		Malioufas 34'	Stadium: Nea Smyrni Stadium; Referee: Naoum

27 September 1987 3	PAOK	5–1	Veria	Thessaloniki
	Bannon 19', 88'; Karasavvidis 21'; Skartados 56' (pen.); Papaioannou 82'		Alexandris 14'	Stadium: Toumba Stadium; Attendance: 9,865; Referee: Bikas

4 October 1987 4	Levadiakos	4–2	PAOK	Thessaloniki
	Lemonis 1' (pen.), 78' (pen.); Kavouras 28'; Kasdovasilis 57'		Alexandridis 6'; Bannon (red card) 32'; Karasavvidis 34'	Stadium: Levadia Municipal Stadium; Attendance: 5,651; Referee: Akridas

18 October 1987 5	PAOK	3–0	Apollon Kalamaria	Thessaloniki
	Psarras 22'; Karasavvidis 68'; Karageorgiou 81'			Stadium: Toumba Stadium; Attendance: 8,899

1 November 1987 6	Panathinaikos	2–1	PAOK	Athens
	Antoniou 35'; Vlachos 44'		Alexandridis 88'	Stadium: Athens Olympic Stadium; Attendance: 18,552

8 November 1987 7	PAOK	1–0	Ethnikos Piraeus	Trikala
	Baniotis 30'			Stadium: Trikala Municipal Stadium; Attendance: 5,161
Note: Game held at Trikala because PAOK had a stadium ban.

22 November 1987 8	Iraklis	1–0	PAOK	Thessaloniki
	Vellios 54'			Stadium: Kaftanzoglio Stadium; Attendance: 13,891

29 November 1987 9	Panserraikos	0–1	PAOK	Serres
			Bannon 83'	Stadium: Serres Municipal Stadium; Attendance: 9,959; Referee: Ntaoulas

6 December 1987 10	PAOK	6–1	Olympiacos	Serres
	Bannon 7'; Mavromatis 14'; Siggas 18'; Baniotis 41'; Borbokis 74', 89'		Tsalouchidis 49'	Stadium: Serres Municipal Stadium; Attendance: 10,827
Note: Game held at Serres because PAOK had a stadium ban.

20 December 1987 11	Panachaiki	0–2	PAOK	Patras
			Papaioannou 72' (pen.); Alexandridis 85'	Stadium: Kostas Davourlis Stadium; Attendance: 6,415; Referee: Kortsaris

27 December 1987 12	PAOK	3–1	Aris	Thessaloniki
	Bannon 9'; Borbokis 37'; Iordanidis 83'		González 67' (pen.)	Stadium: Toumba Stadium; Attendance: 25,246; Referee: Nikakis

3 January 1988 13	Diagoras	0–3	PAOK	Rhodes
			Borbokis 47'; Lagonidis 65'; Leontiadis 81'	Stadium: Diagoras Stadium; Referee: Kantartzis

10 January 1988 14	PAOK	4–0	OFI	Thessaloniki
	Lagonidis 7'; Leontiadis 45'; Skartados 76', 85'			Stadium: Toumba Stadium; Attendance: 29,696

17 January 1988 15	AEL	1–1	PAOK	Larissa
	Mitsibonas 90'		Borbokis 17'; Malioufas (red card) 89'	Stadium: Alcazar Stadium; Attendance: 16,473; Referee: Charlaftis

24 January 1988 16	AEK Athens	1–0	PAOK	Athens
	Pittas 30'			Stadium: Nikos Goumas Stadium; Attendance: 26,217; Referee: Koukoulakis

31 January 1988 17	PAOK	2–0	Panionios	Thessaloniki
	Mavromatis 22'; Borbokis 44'			Stadium: Toumba Stadium; Attendance: 19,079; Referee: Tsirikidis

7 February 1988 18	Veria	2–1	PAOK	Veria
	Alexandris 20'; Pittos 85'		Alexandridis 10'	Stadium: Veria Stadium; Referee: Rinios

14 February 1988 19	PAOK	4–1	Levadiakos	Thessaloniki
	Bannon 20', 23', 67'; Skartados (penalty missed) 62'; Borbokis 80'		Kavouras 84' (pen.)	Stadium: Toumba Stadium; Attendance: 10,259; Referee: Kefalas

21 February 1988 20	Apollon Kalamarias	0–1	PAOK	Thessaloniki
			Mavreas (yellow card) 23' (yellow-red card) 55'; Skartados 50' (pen.)	Stadium: Kalamaria Stadium; Attendance: 7,128; Referee: Germanakos

28 February 1988 21	PAOK	4–1	Panathinaikos	Thessaloniki
	Borbokis 9'; Alexandridis 13'; Skartados 35', 74'		Zajec 8'	Stadium: Toumba Stadium; Attendance: 36,305; Referee: Naoum

6 March 1988 22	Ethnikos Piraeus	1–0	PAOK	Piraeus
	Kotidis 38' (red card) 82'			Stadium: Karaiskakis Stadium; Attendance: 4,771; Referee: Chrysanis

13 March 1988 23	PAOK	0–2	Iraklis	Thessaloniki
			Iliadis 60'; Adamou 65'	Stadium: Toumba Stadium

20 March 1988 24	PAOK	5–0	Panserraikos	Thessaloniki
	Mitoglou 10'; Borbokis 36'; Alexandridis 54'; Leontiadis 58'; Iordanidis 79'			Stadium: Toumba Stadium; Attendance: 7,400; Referee: Nikakis

27 March 1988 25	Olympiacos	2–1	PAOK	Athens
	Funes 15' (pen.); Sofianopoulos 54'		Lagonidis 45'; Skartados (red card) 89'	Stadium: Athens Olympic Stadium; Attendance: 46,027; Referee: Kolokythas

3 April 1988 26	PAOK	2–0	Panachaiki	Thessaloniki
	Lagonidis 10'; Mavromatis 78'		Spanosotiropoulos (red card) 61'	Stadium: Toumba Stadium; Attendance: 7,782; Referee: Bourotzoglou

17 April 1988 27	Aris	1–2	PAOK	Thessaloniki
	Dimitriadis 56'		Skartados 58'; Mavromatis 84'	Stadium: Kleanthis Vikelidis Stadium; Attendance: 16,752; Referee: Kefalas

24 April 1988 28	PAOK	1–0	Diagoras	Thessaloniki
	Kastanos 24' (o.g.)			Stadium: Toumba Stadium; Attendance: 10,378

1 May 1988 29	OFI	2–2	PAOK	Heraklion
	Vera 33'; Papavasiliou 39' (pen.)		Mavromatis 50' (pen.); Mavreas 87'	Stadium: Theodoros Vardinogiannis Stadium; Attendance: 5,902; Referee: Dimitriadis

15 May 1988 30	PAOK	0–0	AEL	Thessaloniki
				Stadium: Toumba Stadium; Attendance: 25,659; Referee: Rinios

== Greek Cup ==
=== First round ===
25 October 1987	Anagennisi Arta	0–1	PAOK	Arta
			Alexandridis 20'

=== Second round ===
30 December 1987 1st leg	PAOK	2–1	Kastoria	Thessaloniki
	Skartados 20' (pen.); Georgakas 30' (o.g.)		Evangelou 84'	Stadium: Toumba Stadium; Referee: Triantafyllou

13 January 1988 2nd leg	Kastoria	3–1 (4–3 agg.)	PAOK	Kastoria
	Karatzas 12'; Nolis 56'; Paraskevopoulos 85'		Iordanidis 61'

== Statistics ==
=== Squad statistics ===
As of May 15, 1988

Appearances denote players in the starting lineup, with the numbers in parentheses denoting appearances as substitute.

No.	Name	Alpha Ethniki		Greek Cup		Total	
No.	Name	Apps	Goals	Apps	Goals	Apps	Goals
Goalkeepers
	(Greece) Giannis Gitsioudis	28	0	2	0	30	0
	(Greece) Apostolos Terzis	2	0	1	0	3	0
Defenders
	(Greece) Nikos Karageorgiou	25	1	2	0	27	1
	(Greece) Kostas Malioufas	20	1	2	0	22	1
	(Greece) Antonis Mavreas	18	1	1	0	19	1
	(Greece) Michalis Leontiadis	16	3	0	0	16	3
	(Greece) Apostolos Tsourelas	16	0	1	0	17	0
	(Greece) Dimitris Mitoglou	13	1	0	0	13	1
	(Greece) Charis Baniotis	9	2	1	0	10	2
	(Greece) Giannis Psarras	5	1	0	0	5	1
	(Greece) Giannis Tsiplakis	3	0	0	0	3	0
	(Greece) Nikos Triantafyllidis	1	0	1	0	2	0
	(Greece) Nikos Alavantas	0	0	0	0	0	0
Midfielders
	(Greece) Sotiris Mavromatis	25	5	3	0	28	5
	(Greece) Georgios Skartados	25	7	2	1	27	8
	(Greece) Kyriakos Alexandridis	25	6	2	1	27	7
	(Greece) Lakis Papaioannou	19	2	2	0	21	2
	(Greece) Thomas Singas	17	1	2	0	19	1
	(Greece) Kostas Lagonidis	16	4	2	0	18	4
	(Greece) Paschalis Seretis	14	0	1	0	15	0
Forwards
	(Greece) Stefanos Borbokis	26	9	3	0	29	9
	(Greece) Aris Karasavvidis	21	4	2	0	23	4
	(Republic of Ireland) Paul Bannon	20	9	0	0	20	9
	(Greece) Michalis Iordanidis	13	2	3	1	16	3
	(Socialist Federal Republic of Yugoslavia) Nikola Nikić	9	0	2	0	11	0
	(Greece) Asterios Roussomanis	4	0	1	0	5	0

Source: Match reports in competitive matches, RSSSF

=== Goalscorers ===
Rank	No.	Pos.	Player	Alpha Ethniki	Greek Cup	Total
1		FW	(Republic of Ireland) Paul Bannon	9	0	9
1		FW	(Greece) Stefanos Borbokis	9	0	9
3		MF	(Greece) Georgios Skartados	7	1	8
4		MF	(Greece) Kyriakos Alexandridis	6	1	7
5		MF	(Greece) Sotiris Mavromatis	5	0	5
6		MF	(Greece) Kostas Lagonidis	4	0	4
6		FW	(Greece) Aris Karasavvidis	4	0	4
8		DF	(Greece) Michalis Leontiadis	3	0	3
8		FW	(Greece) Michalis Iordanidis	2	1	3
10		MF	(Greece) Lakis Papaioannou	2	0	2
10		DF	(Greece) Charis Baniotis	2	0	2
12		MF	(Greece) Thomas Singas	1	0	1
12		DF	(Greece) Nikos Karageorgiou	1	0	1
12		DF	(Greece) Antonis Mavreas	1	0	1
12		DF	(Greece) Kostas Malioufas	1	0	1
12		DF	(Greece) Dimitris Mitoglou	1	0	1
12		DF	(Greece) Giannis Psarras	1	0	1
Own goals				1	1	2
TOTALS				60	4	64

Source: Match reports in competitive matches, RSSSF
