= 1986–87 PAOK FC season =

PAOK
1986–87 season
- President: Charis Savvidis
- Manager: Thijs Libregts
- Stadium: Toumba Stadium
- Alpha Ethniki: 5th
- Greek Cup: 2nd round
- Top goalscorer: League: Georgios Skartados (8); All: Georgios Skartados (8)
- Highest home attendance: 40,718 vs Olympiacos

The 1986–87 season was PAOK Football Club's 60th in existence and the club's 28th consecutive season in the top flight of Greek football. The team entered the Greek Football Cup in first round.

== Players ==
=== Squad ===
Note: Flags indicate national team as defined under FIFA eligibility rules; some limited exceptions apply. Players may hold more than one non-FIFA nationality.

No.	Pos.	Nation	Player
—	GK	GRE	Apostolos Terzis
—	GK	GRE	Giannis Gitsioudis
—	GK	GRE	Takis Pantelis
—	DF	YUG	Ivan Jurišić
—	DF	GRE	Nikos Alavantas (captain)
—	DF	GRE	Apostolos Tsourelas
—	DF	GRE	Charis Baniotis
—	DF	GRE	Kostas Malioufas
—	DF	GRE	Nikos Karageorgiou
—	DF	GRE	Dimitris Mitoglou
—	DF	GRE	Giannis Psarras
—	MF	GRE	Georgios Skartados
—	MF	GRE	Vasilios Vasilakos

No.	Pos.	Nation	Player
—	MF	GRE	Thomas Singas
—	MF	GRE	Lakis Papaioannou
—	MF	GRE	Kyriakos Alexandridis
—	MF	GRE	Sotiris Mavromatis
—	MF	GRE	Nikos Liakos
—	MF	GRE	Peter Skouras
—	FW	GRE	Stefanos Borbokis
—	FW	GRE	Aris Karasavvidis
—	FW	GRE	Michalis Iordanidis
—	FW	GRE	Kostas Orfanos
—	FW	GRE	Asterios Roussomanis

== Transfers ==
Players transferred in

Transfer Window	Pos.	Name	Club	Fee
Summer	DF	(Greece) Nikos Karageorgiou	(Greece) Kavala	Free
Summer	DF	(Greece) Dimitris Mitoglou	(Greece) Doxa Drama	8.5 million Dr.
Summer	MF	(Greece) Peter Skouras	(Greece) San Jose Earthquakes	Free
Summer	MF	(Greece) Lakis Papaioannou	(Greece) Iraklis	32 million Dr.

Players transferred out

Transfer Window	Pos.	Name	Club	Fee
Summer	GK	(Greece) Lakis Stergioudas		Retired
Summer	MF	(Greece) Dimitris Pittas	(Greece) AEK Athens	Free
Summer	FW	(Greece) Giorgos Kostikos	(Greece) Olympiacos	Free
Summer	FW	(Socialist Federal Republic of Yugoslavia) Rade Paprica	(Socialist Federal Republic of Yugoslavia) Željezničar	Free
Winter	MF	(Greece) Nikos Liakos	(Greece) Trikala	Free
Winter	FW	(Greece) Kostas Orfanos	(Greece) Apollon Kalamaria	Free

== Pre-season ==
Win Draw Loss

25 July 1986 Friendly	Anagennisi Chalkidona	0–5	PAOK	Chalkidona
			Vasilakos; Mitoglou; Skartados (pen.); Mavromatis; Alexandridis

27 July 1986 Friendly	PAO Koryfi	0–7	PAOK	Koryfi, Imathia
			Skartados 18'; Roussomanis 22', 50'; Mavromatis 38'; Papaioannou 44'; Karageorgiou 62'; Iordanidis 76'

29 July 1986 Friendly	Borussia Dortmund	4–0	PAOK	Dortmund, West Germany
	Helmer 46'; Mill 83', 87'; Hupe 89'

30 July 1986 Friendly	Santos	3–1	PAOK	Dortmund, West Germany

3 August 1986 Friendly	Winterswijk	0–10	PAOK	Netherlands
			Skartados; Alexandridis; Karageorgiou; Iordanidis; Vasilakos (o.g.)

5 August 1986 Friendly	Heracles Almelo	0–0	PAOK	Netherlands

7 August 1986 Friendly	De Graafschap	4–0	PAOK	Netherlands

9 August 1986 Friendly	PEC Zwolle	2–0	PAOK	Netherlands

10 August 1986 Friendly	Vitesse	3–1	PAOK	Netherlands
			Orfanos 78'

12 August 1986 Friendly	AZ Alkmaar	1–2	PAOK	Netherlands
	52'		Iordanidis 75'; Skartados 82' (pen.)

18 August 1986 Friendly	PAOK	1–0	Aris	Thessaloniki
	Baniotis 13'			Stadium: Toumba Stadium

21 August 1986 Friendly	PAOK	4–1	Veria	Thessaloniki
	Karageorgiou 12'; Tsourelas 14'; Vasilakos 65'; Skartados 74'		83'	Stadium: Toumba Stadium

24 August 1986 Friendly	PAOK	1–0	Panathinaikos	Thessaloniki
	Skartados 83' (pen.)			Stadium: Toumba Stadium; Referee: Tsirikidis

27 August 1986 Friendly	PAOK	5–0	Iraklis	Thessaloniki
	Vasilakos 19'; Skartados 67'; Iordanidis 74', 82'; Psarras 76'			Stadium: Toumba Stadium; Referee: Georgiadis

1 September 1986 Friendly	PAOK	6–1	Anagennisi Epanomi	Thessaloniki
	Liakos 25'; Skartados 60', 78'; Vasilakos 65', 70'; Iordanidis 68'		Margaritelis 52'	Stadium: Toumba Stadium; Referee: Kortsaris

== Competitions ==
=== Overview ===
Competition	Record							
Competition	Pld	W	D	L	GF	GA	GD	Win %
Alpha Ethniki	30	13	9	8	39	23	+16	43.33
Greek Cup	3	2	0	1	3	3	+0	66.67
Total	33	15	9	9	42	26	+16	45.45

Source: Competitions

== Alpha Ethniki ==
=== Standings ===
Pos	Team	Pld	W	D	L	GF	GA	GD	Pts	Qualification or relegation
3	OFI	30	17	4	9	44	27	+17	38	Qualification for Cup Winners' Cup first round
4	Panionios	30	11	11	8	36	22	+14	33	Qualification for UEFA Cup first round
5	PAOK	30	13	9	8	39	23	+16	29	
6	Iraklis	30	13	5	12	34	32	+2	25	
7	AEK Athens	30	10	8	12	31	26	+5	19	

Source: RSSSF
Rules for classification: 1st points; 2nd head-to-head points; 3rd head-to-head goal difference; 4th decision match.
12 clubs went on strike in the last three matchdays. All the clubs exept Olympiacos, Panathinaikos, OFI and Panionios that did not joined the strike were punished, with a deduction of -6 points because they did not show up. AEK Athens had also -3 points because of a case of fixing games in the previous season.

==== Results summary ====
Overall								Home						Away					
Pld	W	D	L	GF	GA	GD	Pts	W	D	L	GF	GA	GD	W	D	L	GF	GA	GD
30	13	9	8	39	23	+16	48	10	3	2	29	9	+20	3	6	6	10	14	−4

Last updated: 7 June 1987.
Source: Competitive matches

==== Results by round ====
Round	1	2	3	4	5	6	7	8	9	10	11	12	13	14	15	16	17	18	19	20	21	22	23	24	25	26	27	28	29	30
Ground	H	A	H	A	H	A	A	H	A	H	A	A	H	H	H	A	H	A	H	A	H	H	A	H	A	H	A	H	A	A
Result	W	D	W	W	W	L	D	D	W	W	D	L	D	W	W	W	W	L	W	D	D	L	D	W	D	W	L	L	L	L
Position	1	1	1	1	1	1	3	2	2	2	2	2	2	2	2	2	2	3	2	2	2	2	2	2	2	2	2	2	4	5

Source: League matches
A = Away; H = Home; W = Win; D = Draw; L = Loss

==== Matches ====
Win Draw Loss

7 September 1986 1	PAOK	4–1	Doxa Drama	Thessaloniki
	Borbokis 21'; Skartados 27' (pen.), 55'; Alexandridis 77'		Vulcev 18' (pen.)	Stadium: Toumba Stadium; Referee: Kolokythas

14 September 1986 2	Ethnikos Piraeus	0–0	PAOK	Piraeus
				Stadium: Karaiskakis Stadium; Attendance: 8,919; Referee: Triantafyllou

21 September 1986 3	PAOK	3–0	Apollon Athens	Thessaloniki
	Baniotis 43'; Skartados 48'; Alexandridis 88'			Stadium: Toumba Stadium; Attendance: 12,757

28 September 1986 4	Aris	0–1	PAOK	Thessaloniki
			Baniotis 48'	Stadium: Kleanthis Vikelidis Stadium; Attendance: 20,968; Referee: Andreou

5 October 1986 5	PAOK	4–1	Olympiacos	Thessaloniki
	Baniotis 14'; Skartados 20' (pen.); Togias 31' (o.g.); Papaioannou 59'		Anastopoulos 27' (pen.); Zelelidis (red card) 62'	Stadium: Toumba Stadium; Attendance: 40,718; Referee: Vassaras

26 October 1986 6	AEL	2–1	PAOK	Larissa
	Galitsios 48'; Alexoulis 84'		Vasilakos 37'	Stadium: Alcazar Stadium; Attendance: 12,768; Referee: Giannopoulos
Note: A tragic incident occurred before the game started. Charalampos Mplionas, a 29-year old spectator, was fatally wounded in the neck by a flare thrown from a PAOK fan who was arrested and convicted afterwards for 8-year prison sentence.

1 November 1986 7	Panathinaikos	0–0	PAOK	Athens
				Stadium: Athens Olympic Stadium; Attendance: 29,663; Referee: Dimitriadis

23 November 1986 8	PAOK	1–1	Apollon Kalamaria	Chania
	Iordanidis 52'		Tsoleridis 29'	Stadium: Perivolia Municipal Stadium; Attendance: 5,916
Note: Game held at Chania because PAOK had a stadium ban.

6 December 1986 9	AEK Athens	1–2	PAOK	Athens
	Patikas 8'		Alexandridis 2'; Malioufas 4'	Stadium: Athens Olympic Stadium; Attendance: 18,349; Referee: Germanakos

14 December 1986 10	PAOK	2–0	OFI	Livadeia
	Papaioannou 31' (pen.); Mavromatis 83'			Stadium: Levadia Municipal Stadium; Referee: Kefalas
Note: Game held at Livadeia because PAOK had a stadium ban.

21 December 1986 11	Iraklis	1–1	PAOK	Thessaloniki
	Anastasiadis 46'		Iordanidis 65'	Stadium: Kaftanzoglio Stadium; Attendance: 23,058; Referee: Kolokythas

4 January 1987 13	Diagoras	2–1	PAOK	Rhodes
	Christofis 51' (pen.), 75'		Borbokis 6'	Stadium: Diagoras Stadium; Referee: Adamopoulos

11 January 1987 12	PAOK	0–0	Veria	Trikala
				Stadium: Trikala Municipal Stadium; Attendance: 1,558; Referee: Kolokythas
Note: Game was initially scheduled on 28 December 1986, but was postponed because of snow. PAOK had a stadium ban and game was held at Trikala.

18 January 1987 14	PAOK	4–1	Panionios	Thessaloniki
	Vasilakos 13', 24'; Alexandridis 30'; Skartados 75' (pen.)		Owen 82'	Stadium: Toumba Stadium; Attendance: 13,841; Referee: Kannos

25 January 1987 15	PAOK	3–1	PAS Giannina	Thessaloniki
	Papaioannou 12' (pen.); Iordanidis 70'; Baniotis 89'		Manevski 55'	Stadium: Toumba Stadium; Attendance: 8,155; Referee: Triantafyllou

1 February 1987 16	Doxa Drama	1–2	PAOK	Drama
	Tsvetkov 48'		Baniotis 18'; Iordanidis 89'	Stadium: Doxa Drama Stadium

8 February 1987 17	PAOK	2–1	Ethnikos Piraeus	Thessaloniki
	Skartados 25'; Alexandridis 53'		Konstantinidis 81'	Stadium: Toumba Stadium; Attendance: 9,716; Referee: Brentas

15 February 1987 18	Apollon Athens	2–0	PAOK	Athens
	Karavelis 20'; Konstantopoulos 62'			Stadium: Rizoupoli Stadium

22 February 1987 19	PAOK	2–0	Aris	Thessaloniki
	Borbokis 29'; Mavromatis 53'			Stadium: Toumba Stadium; Attendance: 26,282; Referee: Voutsaras

1 March 1987 20	Olympiacos	1–1	PAOK	Athens
	Kostikos 84'		Skartados 67'	Stadium: Athens Olympic Stadium; Attendance: 53,720; Referee: Andreou

8 March 1987 21	PAOK	0–0	AEL	Thessaloniki
				Stadium: Toumba Stadium; Attendance: 11,750; Referee: Kontogiannidis

15 March 1987 22	PAOK	2–3	Panathinaikos	Thessaloniki
	Skartados 12'; Vasilakos 64'		Dimopoulos 13', 37', 47'	Stadium: Toumba Stadium; Attendance: 22,166; Referee: Voutsaras

29 March 1987 23	Apollon Kalamaria	0–0	PAOK	Thessaloniki
				Stadium: Kalamaria Stadium; Attendance: 5,794; Referee: Vasilakis

5 April 1987 24	PAOK	1–0	AEK Athens	Thessaloniki
	Vasilakos 58'			Stadium: Toumba Stadium; Attendance: 14,167; Referee: Kantartzis

12 April 1987 25	OFI	1–1	PAOK	Heraklion
	Persias 42'		Psarras 82'	Stadium: Theodoros Vardinogiannis Stadium; Attendance: 10,918

3 May 1987 26	PAOK	1–0	Iraklis	Thessaloniki
	Baniotis 77'			Stadium: Toumba Stadium; Attendance: 20,410

17 May 1987 27	Veria	1–0	PAOK	Veria
	Tsalouchidis 17' (pen.)			Stadium: Veria Stadium; Attendance: 5,431; Referee: Koukoulakis

24 May 1987 28	PAOK	0–0	Diagoras	Thessaloniki
				Stadium: Toumba Stadium
Note: Twelve teams (except Olympiacos, Panathinaikos, OFI and Panionios) declared a strike for the last three matchdays. All of them had a 6-point deduction, the games between the 12 were counted as 0–0 with both teams adding a loss and games against the other 4 teams were awarded 2–0 to the opponents.

31 May 1987 29	Panionios	2–0	PAOK	Athens
				Stadium: Nea Smyrni Stadium
Note: Twelve teams (except Olympiacos, Panathinaikos, OFI and Panionios) declared a strike for the last three matchdays. All of them had a 6-point deduction, the games between the 12 were counted as 0–0 with both teams adding a loss and games against the other 4 teams were awarded 2–0 to the opponents.

7 June 1987 30	PAS Giannina	0–0	PAOK	Ioannina
				Stadium: Zosimades Stadium
Note: Twelve teams (except Olympiacos, Panathinaikos, OFI and Panionios) declared a strike for the last three matchdays. All of them had a 6-point deduction, the games between the 12 were counted as 0–0 with both teams adding a loss and games against the other 4 teams were awarded 2–0 to the opponents.

== Greek Cup ==
=== First round ===
19 November 1986	Fostiras	0–2	PAOK	Athens
			Papaioannou 18'; Orfanos 73'	Stadium: Tavros Stadium

=== Second round ===
21 January 1987 1st leg	Panionios	3–0	PAOK	Athens
	Owen 5' (pen.); Aposporis 37', 49'			Stadium: Nea Smyrni Stadium; Referee: Andreou

4 February 1987 2nd leg	PAOK	1–0 (1–3 agg.)	Panionios	Thessaloniki
	Skartados (penalty missed) 44'; Baniotis 73'			Stadium: Toumba Stadium

== Statistics ==
=== Squad statistics ===
As of June 7, 1987

Appearances denote players in the starting lineup, with the numbers in parentheses denoting appearances as substitute.

No.	Name	Alpha Ethniki		Greek Cup		Total	
No.	Name	Apps	Goals	Apps	Goals	Apps	Goals
Goalkeepers
	(Greece) Apostolos Terzis	27	0	3	0	30	0
	(Greece) Giannis Gitsioudis	0	0	0	0	0	0
	(Greece) Takis Pantelis	0	0	0	0	0	0
Defenders
	(Greece) Charis Baniotis	26	6	1	1	27	7
	(Greece) Kostas Malioufas	24	1	3	0	27	1
	(Greece) Apostolos Tsourelas	23	0	3	0	26	0
	(Greece) Giannis Psarras	21	1	2	0	23	1
	(Greece) Nikos Alavantas	20	0	3	0	23	0
	(Socialist Federal Republic of Yugoslavia) Ivan Jurišić	18	0	3	0	21	0
	(Greece) Nikos Karageorgiou	18	0	1	0	19	0
	(Greece) Dimitris Mitoglou	1	0	0	0	1	0
Midfielders
	(Greece) Kyriakos Alexandridis	27	5	3	0	30	5
	(Greece) Vassilis Vasilakos	27	5	3	0	30	5
	(Greece) Sotiris Mavromatis	26	2	3	0	29	2
	(Greece) Lakis Papaioannou	25	3	3	1	28	4
	(Greece) Georgios Skartados	19	8	1	0	20	8
	(Greece) Thomas Singas	2	0	1	0	3	0
	(Greece) Peter Skouras	2	0	0	0	2	0
	(Greece) Nikos Liakos	1	0	0	0	1	0
Forwards
	(Greece) Stefanos Borbokis	26	3	3	0	29	3
	(Greece) Michalis Iordanidis	8	4	1	0	9	4
	(Greece) Aris Karasavvidis	4	0	0	0	4	0
	(Greece) Kostas Orfanos	2	0	1	1	3	1
	(Greece) Asterios Roussomanis	1	0	0	0	1	0

Source: Match reports in competitive matches, RSSSF

=== Goalscorers ===
Rank	No.	Pos.	Player	Alpha Ethniki	Greek Cup	Total
1		MF	(Greece) Georgios Skartados	8	0	8
2		DF	(Greece) Charis Baniotis	6	1	7
3		MF	(Greece) Kyriakos Alexandridis	5	0	5
3		MF	(Greece) Vasilios Vasilakos	5	0	5
5		FW	(Greece) Michalis Iordanidis	4	0	4
5		MF	(Greece) Lakis Papaioannou	3	1	4
7		FW	(Greece) Stefanos Borbokis	3	0	3
8		MF	(Greece) Sotiris Mavromatis	2	0	2
9		DF	(Greece) Giannis Psarras	1	0	1
9		DF	(Greece) Kostas Malioufas	1	0	1
9		FW	(Greece) Kostas Orfanos	0	1	1
Own goals				1	0	1
TOTALS				39	3	42

Source: Match reports in competitive matches, RSSSF
