= 1988–89 PAOK FC season =

PAOK
1988–89 season
- President: Giannis Dedeoglou
- Manager: Rinus Israël; Nikos Alefantos; Stavros Sarafis
- Stadium: Toumba Stadium
- Alpha Ethniki: 8th
- Greek Cup: Quarter-finals
- UEFA Cup: 1st round
- Top goalscorer: League: Skartados, Small (6); All: Skartados (12)
- Highest home attendance: 39,848 vs Napoli

The 1988–89 season was PAOK Football Club's 62nd in existence and the club's 30th consecutive season in the top flight of Greek football. The team entered the Greek Football Cup in first round and faced Diego Maradona's Napoli in the UEFA Cup.

== Players ==
=== Squad ===
Note: Flags indicate national team as defined under FIFA eligibility rules; some limited exceptions apply. Players may hold more than one non-FIFA nationality.

No.	Pos.	Nation	Player
—	GK	GRE	Giannis Gitsioudis
—	GK	GRE	Apostolos Terzis
—	DF	GRE	Nikos Alavantas (captain)
—	DF	GRE	Apostolos Tsourelas
—	DF	GRE	Kostas Malioufas
—	DF	GRE	Nikos Karageorgiou
—	DF	GRE	Dimitris Mitoglou
—	DF	GRE	Michalis Leontiadis
—	DF	GRE	Antonis Mavreas
—	DF	GRE	Giannis Tsiplakis
—	DF	AUS	Charlie Yankos
—	MF	GRE	Georgios Skartados
—	MF	GRE	Kostas Lagonidis
—	MF	GRE	Kyriakos Alexandridis

No.	Pos.	Nation	Player
—	MF	BRA	Luís Fernando Abichabki
—	MF	NOR	Kjetil Osvold
—	MF	GRE	Giorgos Toursounidis
—	MF	GRE	Nikos Plitsis
—	MF	GRE	Thomas Singas
—	MF	GRE	Paschalis Seretis
—	FW	ENG	Mike Small
—	FW	AUS	John Anastasiadis
—	FW	GRE	Stefanos Borbokis
—	FW	GRE	Aris Karasavvidis
—	FW	GRE	Michalis Iordanidis
—	FW	GRE	Stathis Karalidis
—	FW	GRE	Asterios Roussomanis

== Transfers ==
Players transferred in

Transfer Window	Pos.	Name	Club	Fee
Summer	MF	(Brazil) Luís Fernando Abichabki	(Brazil) Coritiba	40 million Dr.
Summer	MF	(Norway) Kjetil Osvold	(Sweden) Djurgården	?
Summer	MF	(Greece) Nikos Plitsis	(Greece) Panargiakos Argos Orestiko	?
Summer	FW	(England) Mike Small	(Netherlands) Vitesse	?
Summer	FW	(Australia) John Anastasiadis	(Australia) Heidelberg United	6 million Dr.
Summer	FW	(Greece) Stathis Karalidis	(Greece) AE Ampelokipoi	?
Winter	DF	(Australia) Charlie Yankos	(Australia) APIA Leichhardt	?

Players transferred out

Transfer Window	Pos.	Name	Club	Fee
Summer	MF	(Greece) Lakis Papaioannou	(Greece) PAS Giannina	Free
Summer	MF	(Greece) Sotiris Mavromatis	(Greece) Olympiacos	?
Summer	FW	(Republic of Ireland) Paul Bannon	(Greece) AEL	Free
Summer	FW	(Socialist Federal Republic of Yugoslavia) Nikola Nikić	(Socialist Federal Republic of Yugoslavia) Željezničar	Free
Winter	MF	(Greece) Thomas Siggas	(Greece) Apollon Kalamaria	?
Winter	MF	(Greece) Paschalis Seretis	(Greece) Apollon Kalamaria	?
Winter	FW	(Greece) Michalis Iordanidis	(Greece) Apollon Kalamaria	?

== Pre-season ==
Win Draw Loss

22 July 1988 Friendly	FC 08 Villingen	2–5	PAOK	West Germany
			Skartados; Karageorgiou; Fernando (o.g.)

24 July 1988 Friendly	FC Konstanz	1–10	PAOK	West Germany
			Skartados; Plitsis; Small; Karasavvidis; Anastasiadis; Tsourelas; Seretis

27 July 1988 Friendly	SC Pfullendorf	0–7	PAOK	West Germany
			Fernando; Small; Anastasiadis; Skartados; Borbokis

29 July 1988 Friendly	Tuttlingen	0–7	PAOK	West Germany
			Roussomanis; Karalidis; Karasavvidis; Tsiplakis; Siggas; Toursounidis

30 July 1988 Friendly	VfL Sindelfingen	3–0	PAOK	West Germany

5 August 1988 Friendly	PAOK	3–2	Aris	Thessaloniki
	Small 28'; Fernando 46'; Iordanidis 90'		Dimitriadis 45'; Kouis 61'	Stadium: Kaftanzoglio Stadium; Referee: Plevritis

8 August 1988 Friendly	Anagennisi Karditsa	0–6	PAOK	Karditsa
			Karasavvidis 25'; Iordanidis 32'; Triantafyllidis 36'; Karalidis 40'; Anastasiadis 44', 75'	Stadium: Municipal Stadium of Karditsa; Referee: Brentas

10 August 1988 Friendly	AEK Athens	4–2	PAOK	Athens
	Pittas 20', 55'; Patikas 42'; Nielsen 70' (pen.)		Fernando 37'; Skartados 60' (pen.)	Stadium: Nikos Goumas Stadium; Attendance: 13,648; Referee: Giakoumatos

12 August 1988 Friendly	Edessaikos	1–2	PAOK	Edessa
	Papadopoulos 86'		Small 43'; Iordanidis 51'	Stadium: Municipal Stadium of Edessa

14 August 1988 Friendly	PAOK	0–1	Olympiacos	Thessaloniki
			Funes 51'	Stadium: Kaftanzoglio Stadium; Referee: Naziris

17 August 1988 Friendly	Kavala	0–2	PAOK	Kavala
			Skartados 42' (pen.); Anastasiadis 67'	Stadium: Kavala Stadium

27 August 1988 Friendly	PAOK	4–2	Ajax	Thessaloniki
	Fernando 13'; Skartados 16'; Alexandridis 64'; Malioufas 90'		Wouters 25', 78'	Stadium: Kaftanzoglio Stadium; Attendance: 12,375

31 August 1988 Friendly	Kilkisiakos	3–2	PAOK	Kilkis
	Kotakis 30', 77'; Kourtidis 32'		Leontiadis 27'; Iordanidis 86'	Stadium: Municipal Stadium of Kilkis

== Competitions ==
=== Overview ===
Competition	Record							
Competition	Pld	W	D	L	GF	GA	GD	Win %
Alpha Ethniki	30	11	10	9	34	30	+4	36.67
Greek Cup	8	5	1	2	15	7	+8	62.50
UEFA Cup	2	0	1	1	1	2	−1	0.00
Total	40	16	12	12	50	39	+11	40.00

Source: Competitions

=== Managerial statistics ===
Head coach	From	To	Record							
Head coach	From	To	G	W	D	L	GF	GA	GD	Win %
(Netherlands) Rinus Israël	Start of season	22.01.1989	24	12	5	7	37	23	+14	50.00
(Greece) Nikos Alefantos	29.01.1989	09.04.1989	13	4	5	4	11	11	+0	30.77
(Greece) Stavros Sarafis (Interim)	16.04.1989	End of season	3	0	2	1	2	5	−3	0.00

== Alpha Ethniki ==
=== Standings ===
Pos	Team	Pld	W	D	L	GF	GA	GD	Pts
6	AEL	30	10	14	6	37	34	+3	34
7	Aris	30	11	11	8	31	26	+5	33
8	PAOK	30	11	10	9	34	30	+4	32
9	Doxa Drama	30	10	8	12	26	28	−2	28
10	Panionios	30	10	7	13	32	36	−4	27

Source: RSSSF
Rules for classification: 1st points; 2nd head-to-head points; 3rd head-to-head goal difference; 4th decision match.

==== Results summary ====
Overall								Home						Away					
Pld	W	D	L	GF	GA	GD	Pts	W	D	L	GF	GA	GD	W	D	L	GF	GA	GD
30	11	10	9	34	30	+4	43	9	5	1	23	11	+12	2	5	8	11	19	−8

Last updated: 21 May 1989.
Source: Competitive matches

==== Results by round ====
Round	1	2	3	4	5	6	7	8	9	10	11	12	13	14	15	16	17	18	19	20	21	22	23	24	25	26	27	28	29	30
Ground	H	A	H	A	A	H	A	H	A	H	A	H	H	A	H	A	H	A	H	H	A	H	A	H	A	H	A	A	H	A
Result	W	L	W	W	L	W	W	W	D	W	L	W	D	D	L	L	W	D	W	D	D	D	L	D	L	W	L	L	D	D
Position	4	12	6	3	8	3	2	1	1	1	3	2	2	3	4	4	4	4	3	3	3	4	5	6	7	5	7	8	7	8

Source: League matches
A = Away; H = Home; W = Win; D = Draw; L = Loss

==== Matches ====
Win Draw Loss

11 September 1988 1	PAOK	2–1	AEL	Thessaloniki
	Kyrillidis 13' (o.g.); Skartados 58'		Kanieba 6'	Stadium: Toumba Stadium; Referee: Plevritis

18 September 1988 2	Apollon Athens	2–0	PAOK	Athens
	Karanikas 67'; Jurišić 85'			Stadium: Rizoupoli Stadium; Attendance: 6,038

25 September 1988 3	PAOK	2–1	Iraklis	Thessaloniki
	Fernando 22', 80'		Th.Dimopoulos 81'	Stadium: Toumba Stadium; Attendance: 21,967; Referee: Bikas

2 October 1988 4	Olympiacos	0–1	PAOK	Athens
	Funes (red card) 40'		Lagonidis (red card) 40'; Borbokis 56'; Karageorgiou (red card) 81'	Stadium: Athens Olympic Stadium; Attendance: 74,232; Referee: Charlavanis

9 October 1988 5	OFI	3–1	PAOK	Heraklion
	Mitoglou 37' (o.g.); Charalambidis 43'; Hisis 66'; Goulis (red card) 71'		Skartados 63' (pen.); Mavreas (red card) 71'	Stadium: Theodoros Vardinogiannis Stadium; Attendance: 9,067; Referee: Mintiouris

23 October 1988 6	PAOK	2–1	Panionios	Thessaloniki
	Small 21', 51'		Mavros 63'	Stadium: Toumba Stadium; Attendance: 12,317; Referee: Bikas

6 November 1988 7	Apollon Kalamaria	1–4	PAOK	Thessaloniki
	Traianopoulos 65'		Singas 28'; Small 44'; Alexandridis 72'; Borbokis 86'	Stadium: Kalamaria Stadium; Attendance: 3,566; Referee: Fillipiadis

13 November 1988 8	PAOK	1–0	Panathinaikos	Thessaloniki
	Skartados 59' (pen.)			Stadium: Toumba Stadium; Attendance: 25,291; Referee: Germanakos

20 November 1988 9	Aris	0–0	PAOK	Thessaloniki
				Stadium: Kleanthis Vikelidis Stadium; Attendance: 12,947; Referee: Nikakis

27 November 1988 10	PAOK	5–1	Ethnikos Piraeus	Thessaloniki
	Fernando 27'; Alexandridis 39'; Borbokis 41'; Lagonidis 51'; Leontiadis 53'		Chortsas (red card) 55'; Katsikogiannis 90' (pen.)	Stadium: Toumba Stadium; Attendance: 6,682; Referee: Giannopoulos

4 December 1988 11	Levadiakos	2–1	PAOK	Levadeia
	Barrios 7'; Lemonis 75'		Small 27'	Stadium: Levadia Municipal Stadium; Referee: Mintiouris

11 December 1988 12	PAOK	1–0	Doxa Drama	Thessaloniki
	Fernando 9'			Stadium: Toumba Stadium; Attendance: 9,999; Referee: Karamanis

31 December 1988 13	PAOK	1–1	Olympiacos Volos	Thessaloniki
	Skartados 55'		Skoutas 63'	Stadium: Toumba Stadium; Attendance: 7,216
Note: Game was initially scheduled on 18 December, but was postponed because of snow.

8 January 1989 14	Diagoras	1–1	PAOK	Rhodes
	Bisdikis 16'		Mitoglou 61'	Stadium: Diagoras Stadium

15 January 1989 15	PAOK	0–1	AEK Athens	Thessaloniki
			Christodoulou 24'	Stadium: Toumba Stadium; Attendance: 31,969; Referee: Nikakis

22 January 1989 16	AEL	2–1	PAOK	Larissa
	Mitsibonas 69'; Karapialis 79'; Athanasiou (red card) 79'		Yankos 22'	Stadium: Alcazar Stadium; Attendance: 10,986; Referee: Giakoumatos

29 January 1989 17	PAOK	3–2	Apollon Athens	Thessaloniki
	Small 9', 65'; Skartados 44'		Vlachos 45'; Apostolou 84'	Stadium: Toumba Stadium; Attendance: 11,070

5 February 1989 18	Iraklis	0–0	PAOK	Thessaloniki
				Stadium: Kaftanzoglio Stadium; Attendance: 21,007; Referee: Dimitriadis

12 February 1989 19	PAOK	1–0	Olympiacos	Thessaloniki
	Karasavvidis 66'			Stadium: Toumba Stadium; Attendance: 32,112; Referee: Germanakos

20 February 1989 20	PAOK	0–0	OFI	Thessaloniki
				Stadium: Toumba Stadium; Attendance: 7,798; Referee: Vasilakis

26 February 1989 21	Panionios	0–0	PAOK	Athens
				Stadium: Nea Smyrni Stadium; Attendance: 5,710

5 March 1989 22	PAOK	1–1	Apollon Kalamaria	Kavala
	Tsourelas 72'		Vellios 64'; Seretis (red card) 87'	Stadium: Kavala Stadium; Referee: Vasilakis
Note: Game held at Kavala because PAOK had a stadium ban.

12 March 1989 23	Panathinaikos	1–0	PAOK	Athens
	Saravakos 25' (pen.)			Stadium: Leoforos Stadium; Attendance: 13,771; Referee: Naziris

19 March 1989 24	PAOK	1–1	Aris	Thessaloniki
	Lagonidis 80'		Dimitriadis 58'	Stadium: Toumba Stadium; Attendance: 14,663; Referee: Filippidis

26 March 1989 25	Ethnikos Piraeus	2–1	PAOK	Piraeus
	Chojnacki 37'; Batista 58'		Yankos 20'	Stadium: Karaiskakis Stadium; Attendance: 6,599

2 April 1989 26	PAOK	2–0	Levadiakos	Thessaloniki
	Karageorgiou 56' (pen.); Fernando 72'			Stadium: Toumba Stadium; Attendance: 4,849; Referee: Iatropoulos

9 April 1989 27	Doxa Drama	1–0	PAOK	Drama
	Charalambidis 89' (pen.)			Stadium: Doxa Drama Stadium; Referee: Naziris

16 April 1989 28	Olympiacos Volos	4–1	PAOK	Volos
	Karamichalos 34'; Boda 50' (pen.), 60', 79'		Anastasiadis 30'	Stadium: Volos Municipal Stadium; Attendance: 5,093; Referee: Adamopoulos

7 May 1989 29	PAOK	1–1	Diagoras	Thessaloniki
	Osvold 61' (pen.)		Krassonis 1'	Stadium: Toumba Stadium; Attendance: 1,599; Referee: Kefalas

21 May 1989 30	AEK Athens	0–0	PAOK	Athens
				Stadium: Nikos Goumas Stadium; Attendance: 25,934; Referee: Iatropoulos

== Greek Cup ==
=== First round (group stage) ===
21 August 1988	PAOK	3–0	Thriamvos Athens	Thessaloniki
	Skartados 63' (pen.); Borbokis 85', 89'		Matzounis (red card) 76'	Stadium: Kleanthis Vikelidis Stadium; Attendance: 3,134; Referee: Andreou
Note: Game held at Kleanthis Vikelidis Stadium because Toumba was temporarily closed.

4 September 1988	Proodeftiki	1–0	PAOK	Piraeus
	Fotis 8'			Stadium: Nikaia Municipal Stadium; Referee: Stefanidis

=== Second round ===
30 November 1988 1st leg	PAOK	3–0	Naoussa	Thessaloniki
	Skartados 50' (pen.), 77'; Lagonidis 70'			Stadium: Toumba Stadium; Attendance: 1,793; Referee: Charlavanis

14 December 1988 2nd leg	Naoussa	1–3 (1–6 agg.)	PAOK	Naousa
	Markou 11'		Small 25', 36'; Borbokis 62'	Stadium: Municipal Stadium of Naousa; Referee: Naoum

=== Third round ===
28 December 1988 1st leg	PAOK	2–2	Levadiakos	Thessaloniki
	Skartados (penalty missed) 56' 89'; Small 70'		Kavouras 25', 86'	Stadium: Toumba Stadium; Attendance: 6,625; Referee: Stefanidis

11 January 1989 2nd leg	Levadiakos	0–2 (2–4 agg.)	PAOK	Livadeia
	Lemonis (penalty missed) 89'		Small 52'; Anastasiadis 75'	Stadium: Levadia Municipal Stadium; Referee: Dimitriadis

=== Quarter-finals ===
1 February 1989 1st leg	PAOK	2–0	Panionios	Thessaloniki
	Small 17'; Skartados 88'			Stadium: Toumba Stadium; Attendance: 7,927; Referee: Amygdalis

15 February 1989 2nd leg	Panionios	3–0 (a.e.t.) (3–2 agg.)	PAOK	Athens
	Mavros 33', 119'; Aposporis 47'			Stadium: Nea Smyrni Stadium; Referee: Nikakis

== UEFA Cup ==
=== First round ===
7 September 1988 1st leg	Napoli (Italy)	1–0	(Greece) PAOK	Naples, Italy
	Maradona 59' (pen.)	Report		Stadium: Stadio San Paolo; Attendance: 62,662; Referee: Aron Schmidhuber (West Germany)

6 October 1988 2nd leg	PAOK (Greece)	1–1 (1–2 agg.)	(Italy) Napoli	Thessaloniki, Greece
	Skartados 65'	Report	Careca 17'	Stadium: Toumba Stadium; Attendance: 39,848; Referee: Horst Brummeier (Austria)

== Statistics ==
=== Squad statistics ===
As of May 21, 1989

Appearances denote players in the starting lineup, with the numbers in parentheses denoting appearances as substitute.

No.	Name	Alpha Ethniki		Greek Cup		UEFA Cup		Total	
No.	Name	Apps	Goals	Apps	Goals	Apps	Goals	Apps	Goals
Goalkeepers
	(Greece) Giannis Gitsioudis	29	0	8	0	2	0	39	0
	(Greece) Apostolos Terzis	1	0	0	0	0	0	1	0
Defenders
	(Greece) Antonis Mavreas	26	0	8	0	2	0	36	0
	(Greece) Nikos Karageorgiou	26	1	6	0	2	0	34	1
	(Greece) Dimitris Mitoglou	25	1	6	0	2	0	33	1
	(Greece) Kostas Malioufas	23	0	7	0	2	0	32	0
	(Greece) Michalis Leontiadis	20	1	5	0	1	0	26	1
	(Greece) Apostolos Tsourelas	16	1	6	0	1	0	23	1
	(Greece) Nikos Alavantas	15	0	4	0	0	0	19	0
	(Australia) Charlie Yankos	7	1	2	0	0	0	9	1
	(Greece) Giannis Tsiplakis	4	0	0	0	0	0	4	0
Midfielders
	(Greece) Kostas Lagonidis	23	2	7	1	2	0	32	3
	(Greece) Georgios Skartados	21	6	7	5	2	1	30	12
	(Brazil) Luís Fernando Abichabki	21	5	4	0	2	0	27	5
	(Greece) Kyriakos Alexandridis	18	2	5	0	2	0	25	2
	(Norway) Kjetil Osvold	12	1	1	0	0	0	13	1
	(Greece) Thomas Singas	3	1	0	0	0	0	3	1
	(Greece) Giorgos Toursounidis	2	0	0	0	0	0	2	0
	(Greece) Paschalis Seretis	1	0	0	0	0	0	1	0
Forwards
	(Greece) Stefanos Borbokis	25	3	7	3	2	0	34	6
	(England) Mike Small	24	6	7	5	2	0	33	11
	(Greece) Aris Karasavvidis	24	1	6	0	2	0	32	1
	(Australia) John Anastasiadis	18	1	4	1	0	0	22	2
	(Greece) Stathis Karalidis	2	0	1	0	0	0	3	0

Source: Match reports in competitive matches, RSSSF

=== Goalscorers ===
Rank	No.	Pos.	Player	Alpha Ethniki	Greek Cup	UEFA Cup	Total
1		MF	(Greece) Georgios Skartados	6	5	1	12
2		FW	(England) Mike Small	6	5	0	11
3		FW	(Greece) Stefanos Borbokis	3	3	0	6
4		MF	(Brazil) Luís Fernando Abichabki	5	0	0	5
5		MF	(Greece) Kostas Lagonidis	2	1	0	3
6		MF	(Greece) Kyriakos Alexandridis	2	0	0	2
6		FW	(Australia) John Anastasiadis	1	1	0	2
8		DF	(Greece) Michalis Leontiadis	1	0	0	1
8		DF	(Greece) Nikos Karageorgiou	1	0	0	1
8		DF	(Greece) Apostolos Tsourelas	1	0	0	1
8		DF	(Greece) Dimitris Mitoglou	1	0	0	1
8		DF	(Australia) Charlie Yankos	1	0	0	1
8		MF	(Norway) Kjetil Osvold	1	0	0	1
8		MF	(Greece) Thomas Singas	1	0	0	1
8		FW	(Greece) Aris Karasavvidis	1	0	0	1
Own goals				1	0	0	1
TOTALS				34	15	1	50

Source: Match reports in competitive matches, RSSSF
