= Charis Baniotis =

Greek footballer (born in 1960)

Personal information
- Date of birth: 27 March 1960 (age 66)
- Place of birth: Komotini, Greece
- Height: 1.86 m (6 ft 1 in)
- Position: Centre back

Youth career
- 1975–1980: PAOK

Senior career*
| Years | Team | Apps | (Gls) |
| 1980–1987 | PAOK | 103 | (11) |
| 1980–1981 | → Panthrakikos (loan) | 32 | (6) |
| 1987–1989 | Olympiacos | 28 | (0) |
| 1989–1991 | Xanthi | 47 | (3) |
| Total | | 178 | (14) |
- * Club domestic league appearances and goals

Charis Baniotis (Greek: Χάρης Μπανιώτης; born 27 March 1960) is a former Greek footballer who played as a central defender. His nephew is retired high jumper Konstantinos Baniotis.

== Career ==
Baniotis was born in Komotini and his family moved to Thessaloniki in the early 1970s. He joined PAOK youth ranks in 1975 and he was loaned to Panthrakikos for the 1980–81 season. From 1982 to 1987, he gradually became a starter at PAOK, playing as a central defender. He made 103 league appearances scoring 11 goals with the White-blacks of the North and won the 1985 league title.

In December 1987, PAOK crushed rivals Olympiacos 6–1 at Serres Municipal Stadium with Baniotis scoring a goal and shortly after, the Red-whites president George Koskotas made a lucrative offer of 80 million drachmas to acquire him. Baniotis therefore descended to Piraeus and played for Olympiacos until 1989, making 28 league appearances. He then moved to Xanthi and ended his career in 1991.

== Career statistics ==
Appearances and goals by club, season and competition
| Club | Season | Greek League | | Greek Cup | | Continental | | Total | |
| Club | Season | Apps | Goals | Apps | Goals | Apps | Goals | Apps | Goals |
|---|---|---|---|---|---|---|---|---|---|
| PAOK | 1982–83 | 1 | 0 | 0 | 0 | 0 | 0 | 1 | 0 |
| PAOK | 1983–84 | 26 | 0 | 6 | 0 | 3 | 0 | 35 | 0 |
| PAOK | 1984–85 | 24 | 2 | 4 | 0 | – | | 28 | 2 |
| PAOK | 1985–86 | 17 | 1 | 2 | 0 | 1 | 0 | 20 | 1 |
| PAOK | 1986–87 | 26 | 6 | 1 | 1 | – | | 27 | 7 |
| PAOK | 1987–88 (i) | 9 | 2 | 1 | 0 | – | | 10 | 2 |
| PAOK | Total | 103 | 11 | 14 | 1 | 4 | 0 | 121 | 12 |
| Olympiacos | 1987–88 (ii) | 14 | 0 | 8 | 0 | – | | 22 | 0 |
| Olympiacos | 1988–89 | 14 | 0 | 3 | 0 | – | | 17 | 0 |
| Olympiacos | Total | 28 | 0 | 11 | 0 | – | | 39 | 0 |
| Xanthi | 1989–90 | 27 | 3 | | | – | | | |
| Xanthi | 1990–91 | 20 | 0 | | | – | | | |
| Xanthi | Total | 47 | 3 | | | – | | | |
| Career total | | 178 | 14 | | | 4 | 0 | | |

Source: RSSSF

== Honours ==
PAOK

- Alpha Ethniki: 1984–85
