= Eleana Papaioannou =

Greek pop-folk singer

Eleanna Papaioannou
- Ελεάνα Παπαϊωάννου
- Born: 30 December 1983 (age 42); Thessaloniki, Greece
- Occupation: Singer
- Years active: 2002–present
- Spouse: Dimitrios Verginis (m. 2017)
- Children: 1
- Parents: Lakis Papaioannou (father); Dina Papaioannou (mother)

Eleanna Papaioannou (Greek: Ελεάνα Παπαϊωάννου) is a Greek pop-folk singer known from her appearance in the first season of the Greek reality music talent competition Fame Story, in which she finished fourth. Following the competition, Papaioannou was signed to Heaven Music, through which she launched her solo music career in the mid to late 2000s.

== Biography ==
Papaioannou was born in Thessaloniki, Greece, the daughter of former international football player Lakis Papaioannou and singer Dina Papaioannou. She studied philosophy at Aristotle University of Thessaloniki, and gained notoriety through her 2002 fourth place finish in the first season of Greek reality television show Fame Story, a music talent competition based on Endemol's Star Academy. After the show, Papaioannou continued in the music profession, releasing her first album Koitakse Me in 2004, with record label Heaven Music. The album produced two singles, including "Na m' Agapas", composed by Giannis Spanos, and "Tesseris kai Misi". Two years later in 2006, her second album Fila Me was released by Virus Music and included the single "Apotheoste Ton". A third album, Erotas, was released in 2007 by Virus Music. Later in 2007, two standalone CD singles were released featuring the songs "Koita" and "Argises".

== Personal life ==
On 1 July 2017, Eleanna Papaioannou married Greek professional basketball player Dimitrios Verginis in Thessaloniki. On 28 March 2018 she gave birth to their daughter.
