= Gary Owen (footballer) =

English footballer (born 1958)

Personal information
- Date of birth: 7 July 1958 (age 68)
- Place of birth: St Helens, England
- Height: 5 ft 9 in (1.75 m)
- Position: Midfielder

Youth career
- 1972–1975: Manchester City

Senior career*
Years	Team	Apps	(Gls)
1975–1979	Manchester City	103	(19)
1979–1986	West Bromwich Albion	187	(11)
1986–1987	Panionios	23	(5)
1987–1988	Sheffield Wednesday	14	(0)
1988	Hammarby IF	2	(0)
1988–1989	APOEL	16	(4)
Total		345	(39)

International career
1976	England Youth	2	(0)
1977–1982	England U21	22	(4)
1978	England B	7	(0)
- * Club domestic league appearances and goals

Gary Owen (born 7 July 1958) is an English retired football midfielder. With 22 caps, he is one of the most capped players for England Under-21s, but never made it into the senior team. He was also capped seven times for England B. With the under-21s he won the 1982 UEFA European Under-21 Football Championship, in which he scored two goals in the final against West Germany.

== Professional career ==
Owen started his career with Manchester City, with whom he turned professional in 1975 and made his debut aged 17, against Wolverhampton Wanderers in March 1976. After winning the League Cup earlier in the year, in October 1976 Owen scored his first goal, against West Ham United.

In 1979 Owen was sold, as part of City manager Malcolm Allison's clear-out, to West Bromwich Albion for £450,000 (Note: According to some sources, the fee was £550,000.), despite being a strong fans' favourite. At Albion, he was a regular, and although a midfielder, was awarded the number 10 shirt usually reserved for a striker, and he was also the club's first choice penalty-taker.

He suffered two broken ankles and meningitis in the 1984–85 season, and the following year, 1985–86, lost his place in the side due to his injuries. West Bromwich were relegated, and Owen joined Panionios in Greece for 1986–87. For the 1987–88 season he returned to England for a year with Sheffield Wednesday. He ended his career in season 1988–89 with APOEL in Cyprus. Before going to Cyprus, he also played two games for Swedish club Hammarby IF in 1988. It was two away games against Malmö FF and Örgryte IS for a total of 157 minutes.

== Post Playing ==
Owen worked as a journalist in Manchester, providing opinion on Manchester City in the Manchester Evening News and on local radio station, Century FM. He also has an art dealership, "Gary Owen Fine Art".
