= Thomas Singas =

Greek footballer

Personal information
- Date of birth: 5 September 1958 (age 68)
- Place of birth: Naousa, Greece
- Height: 1.86 m (6 ft 1 in)
- Positions: Defender; midfielder

Youth career
- 1972–1975: Naoussa

Senior career*
Years	Team	Apps	(Gls)
1975–1978	Naoussa		
1978–1988	PAOK	182	(15)
1989	Apollon Kalamarias	10	(1)
Total		192	(16)
- * Club domestic league appearances and goals

Thomas Singas (Greek: Θωμάς Σίγγας; born 5 September 1958) is a retired Greek footballer who played as a defender and midfielder.

== Career ==
Born in Naousa, Singas began his football career playing as a forward for his hometown club Naoussa. Between 1975 and 1978, he spent three seasons with the team in the second-tier Beta Ethniki.

In the summer of 1978, he was acquired by PAOK and wore the white-black jersey for over ten years playing as a central defender or defensive midfielder. He was a vital member of the squad that won PAOK's second league title in 1985 and made a total of 182 league appearances scoring 15 goals with the White-blacks of the North. Singas was known for his abilities in the air, being able to deliver powerful headers towards goal as he positioned himself well at set pieces.

He had a brief spell at Apollon Kalamarias in 1989 and ended his career.

== Career statistics ==
Appearances and goals by club, season and competition
Club	Season	League			Greek Cup		Continental		Total	
Club	Season	Division	Apps	Goals	Apps	Goals	Apps	Goals	Apps	Goals
Naoussa	1975–76	Beta Ethniki				0	–			
Naoussa	1976–77	Beta Ethniki			1	0	–			
Naoussa	1977–78	Beta Ethniki				0	–			
Naoussa	Total					0	–			
PAOK	1978–79	Alpha Ethniki	10	0	1	0	0	0	11	0
PAOK	1979–80	Alpha Ethniki	4	0	3	0	–		7	0
PAOK	1980–81	Alpha Ethniki	25	3	7	0	–		32	3
PAOK	1981–82	Alpha Ethniki	33	4	7	2	2	0	42	6
PAOK	1982–83	Alpha Ethniki	30	0	5	0	4	0	39	0
PAOK	1983–84	Alpha Ethniki	5	1	2	0	1	0	8	1
PAOK	1984–85	Alpha Ethniki	24	3	9	1	–		33	4
PAOK	1985–86	Alpha Ethniki	29	2	2	0	2	0	33	2
PAOK	1986–87	Alpha Ethniki	2	0	1	0	–		3	0
PAOK	1987–88	Alpha Ethniki	17	1	2	0	–		19	1
PAOK	1988–89 (i)	Alpha Ethniki	3	1	0	0	0	0	3	1
PAOK	Total		182	15	39	3	9	0	230	18
Apollon Kalamarias	1988–89 (ii)	Alpha Ethniki	10	1	0	0	–		10	1
Career total			192	16	39	3	9	0	240	19

Source: RSSSF

== Honours ==
PAOK

- Alpha Ethniki: 1984–85
