= Georgios Skartados =

Greek footballer

Giorgos Skartados
Personal information
- Full name: Georgios Skartados
- Date of birth: 7 April 1960 (age 66)
- Place of birth: Rhodes, Greece
- Height: 1.83 m (6 ft 0 in)
- Position: Central midfielder

Youth career
- 1975–1976: Rodos

Senior career*
Years	Team	Apps	(Gls)
1976–1982	Rodos	87	(5)
1982–1992	PAOK	265	(84)
1992–1995	Iraklis	94	(16)
1995–1997	Olympiacos	32	(3)
1997–1998	Ialysos		
Total		478	(108)

International career
1983–1992	Greece	26	(3)
1984	Greece Olympic	2	(0)

Managerial career
- 2004–2005: Kalymniakos
- 2005: Trikala
- 2011: Rodos
- 2011: A.S. Meteora
- 2013–2016: Olympiacos Academy Thessaloniki
- * Club domestic league appearances and goals

Georgios Skartados (Greek: Γεώργιος Σκαρτάδος; born 7 April 1960) is a Greek former international footballer who played as a midfielder.

== Career ==
=== Club career ===
Born in Rhodes, Skartados started his football career at local club Rodos in 1975, aged 15. The next year, he joined the first team and after two seasons in the second division, they managed to get promoted to the top-tier Alpha Ethniki in 1978.

In the summer of 1982, he joined PAOK and quickly became a first-team regular at the White-blacks of the North. Although he was initially acquired by PAOK president Giorgos Pantelakis to replace Giannis Gounaris as a right wing-back, Skartados shined as a box-to-box midfielder who had good all-round abilities, skilled at both defending and attacking. Regarded as one of the greatest midfielders in club's history, Skartados wore the No 8 white-black jersey for ten seasons and won the league title in 1985. He is PAOK 8th all-time appearance maker with 342 games in total (265 in the league) and 4th all-time goalscorer with 112 goals (84 in the league).

In 1992, Skartados moved to Iraklis and played for three seasons, making 94 league appearances and scoring 16 goals in total. He was named PSAP Best Greek Player of 1994–95 season alongside Giorgos Georgiadis of Panathinaikos and Michalis Kasapis of AEK Athens. In 1995, he was acquired by Olympiacos and won the 1997 league title playing as a sweeper (libero).

He ended his career in 1998, playing his last season for Ialysos in the third-tier Gamma Ethniki, helping the club to be promoted to the second-tier Beta Ethniki.

=== International career ===
Skartados had 26 caps for the Greece national team between 1983 and 1992, scoring 3 goals.

== Career statistics ==
=== Club career ===
Appearances and goals by club, season and competition
Club	Season	League			Cup		Continental		Total	
Club	Season	Division	Apps	Goals	Apps	Goals	Apps	Goals	Apps	Goals
Rodos	1976–77	Beta Ethniki					–			
Rodos	1977–78	Beta Ethniki					–			
Rodos	1978–79	Alpha Ethniki	27	3			–			
Rodos	1979–80	Alpha Ethniki	30	0			–			
Rodos	1980–81	Beta Ethniki					–			
Rodos	1981–82	Alpha Ethniki	30	2			–			
Rodos	Total		87	5			–			
PAOK	1982–83	Alpha Ethniki	32	2	7	0	4	0	43	2
PAOK	1983–84	Alpha Ethniki	27	3	7	2	4	1	38	6
PAOK	1984–85	Alpha Ethniki	29	11	5	1	–		34	12
PAOK	1985–86	Alpha Ethniki	27	11	2	0	2	1	31	12
PAOK	1986–87	Alpha Ethniki	19	8	1	0	–		20	8
PAOK	1987–88	Alpha Ethniki	25	7	2	1	–		27	8
PAOK	1988–89	Alpha Ethniki	21	6	7	5	2	1	30	12
PAOK	1989–90	Alpha Ethniki	33	15	7	2	–		40	17
PAOK	1990–91	Alpha Ethniki	23	12	9	5	2	0	34	17
PAOK	1991–92	Alpha Ethniki	29	9	12	8	4	1	45	18
PAOK	Total		265	84	59	24	18	4	342	112
Iraklis	1992–93	Alpha Ethniki	32	5			–			
Iraklis	1993–94	Alpha Ethniki	29	5			0	0		
Iraklis	1994–95	Alpha Ethniki	33	6			–			
Iraklis	Total		94	16			0	0		
Olympiacos	1995–96	Alpha Ethniki	29	3	4	0	5	2	38	5
Olympiacos	1996–97	Alpha Ethniki	3	0	1	0	0	0	4	0
Olympiacos	Total		32	3	5	0	5	2	42	5
Ialysos	1997–98	Gamma Ethniki					–			
Career total			478	108			23	6		

Source: RSSSF

=== International career ===
National team	Year	Caps	Goals
Greece
Greece	1983	1	0
Greece	1985	3	1
Greece	1986	8	1
Greece	1987	5	0
Greece	1988	8	1
Greece	1992	1	0
Total		26	3

List of international goals scored by Georgios Skartados
No.	Date	Venue	Opponent	Score	Result	Competition
1	30 October 1985	Qemal Stafa Stadium, Tirana	Albania	1–1	1–1	1986 FIFA World Cup qualification
2	24 September 1986	El Molinón, Gijón	Spain	1–3	1–3	Friendly
3	6 April 1988	Karaiskakis Stadium, Piraeus	Austria	2–1	2–2	Friendly

== Honours ==
Rodos

- Beta Ethniki: 1977–78, 1980–81

PAOK

- Alpha Ethniki: 1984–85

Olympiacos

- Alpha Ethniki: 1996–97

Ialysos

- Gamma Ethniki: 1997–98

Individual

- PSAP Best Greek Player: 1994–95
