= Kyriakos Alexandridis =

Greek footballer

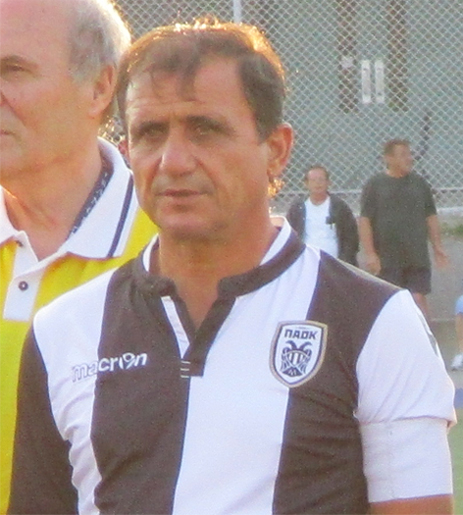
- Alexandridis in 2017

Personal information
- Full name: Kyriakos Alexandridis
- Date of birth: 8 May 1961 (age 65)
- Place of birth: Nymfopetra, Thessaloniki, Greece
- Height: 1.70 m (5 ft 7 in)
- Position: Midfielder

Team information
- Current team: PAOK (scout)

Youth career
- 1973–1979: PAOK

Senior career*
Years	Team	Apps	(Gls)
1979–1989	PAOK	169	(21)
1989–1991	Aris	27	(1)
1991–1994	Doxa Drama	117	(17)
1994–1995	Edessaikos	22	(2)
1995–1996	Agrotikos Asteras		
1996–1997	Naoussa		
1997–1998	Doxa Drama		

Managerial career
- 2004: Doxa Drama
- 2009–2010: Visaltiakos
- 2012–2013: PAOK U20
- * Club domestic league appearances and goals

Kyriakos Alexandridis (Greek: Κυριάκος Αλεξανδρίδης; born 8 May 1961) is a Greek former professional footballer who played as a midfielder.

Since retiring, he has worked in various administrative positions within the PAOK Academy.

== Career ==
Alexandridis began his football career in the youth ranks of PAOK at the age of 12. He was promoted to the first team in 1979 at the age of 18 and played for ten seasons recording over 200 appearances in all competitions. He was a vital member of the squad that won PAOK's second league title in 1985.

In 1989, he moved to city rivals Aris after a recommendation for his acquisition by Alketas Panagoulias. In December 1990, he moved to Doxa Drama and enjoyed a productive period with Doxa, scoring 17 goals in 117 league matches over a three-and-a-half-year span. He played his last season at the top-tier Alpha Ethniki (1994–95) with Edessaikos and finished his career at Doxa Drama in 1998.

== Career statistics ==
Alexandridis in the Greek Championship
Club	Division	Season	Apps	Goals
PAOK	Alpha Ethniki	1979–80	17	1
PAOK	Alpha Ethniki	1980–81	10	3
PAOK	Alpha Ethniki	1981–82	0	0
PAOK	Alpha Ethniki	1982–83	2	0
PAOK	Alpha Ethniki	1983–84	30	1
PAOK	Alpha Ethniki	1984–85	18	2
PAOK	Alpha Ethniki	1985–86	22	1
PAOK	Alpha Ethniki	1986–87	27	5
PAOK	Alpha Ethniki	1987–88	25	6
PAOK	Alpha Ethniki	1988–89	18	2
PAOK	Total		169	21
Aris	Alpha Ethniki	1989–90	25	1
Aris	Alpha Ethniki	1990–91 (i)	2	0
Aris	Total		27	1
Doxa Drama	Alpha Ethniki	1990–91 (ii)	23	3
Doxa Drama	Alpha Ethniki	1991–92	30	5
Doxa Drama	Alpha Ethniki	1992–93	33	3
Doxa Drama	Alpha Ethniki	1993–94	31	6
Doxa Drama	Total		117	17
Edessaikos	Alpha Ethniki	1994–95	22	2
Career total			335	41

Source: RSSSF

== Honours ==
PAOK

- Alpha Ethniki: 1984–85
