= Paul Bannon =

Irish footballer (1956–2016)

Personal information
- Full name: Paul Anthony Bannon
- Date of birth: 15 November 1956
- Place of birth: Dublin, Ireland
- Date of death: 15 February 2016 (aged 59)
- Positions: Centre forward; centre half

Youth career
- Nottingham Forest

Senior career*
Years	Team	Apps	(Gls)
1975–1976	Nottingham Forest	0	(0)
1977–1978	Corby Town		
1978	Ammanford Town		
1978–1979	Bridgend Town		
1979–1983	Carlisle United	140	(45)
1983	→ Darlington (loan)	2	(0)
1983–1986	Bristol Rovers	29	(8)
1984	→ Cardiff City (loan)	4	(0)
1984	→ Plymouth Argyle (loan)	2	(0)
1986–1987	NAC Breda	9	(6)
1987–1988	PAOK	20	(9)
1988–1989	AEL	11	(3)
1989–1993	Cork City	106	(9)
1993–1995	Cobh Ramblers	60	(4)
- * Club domestic league appearances and goals

Paul Anthony Bannon (15 November 1956 – 15 February 2016) was an Irish professional footballer who played most of his career as a centre forward, moving to centre half for his last few years in the League of Ireland. Bannon played in England, Wales, the Netherlands, Greece and Ireland, making over 200 career appearances.

== Early life ==
Bannon was born in Dublin, the son of Tipperary senior inter-county hurler, three-time All-Ireland title winner, Séamus Bannon.

== Career ==
=== Corby Town ===
Bannon began his career at Nottingham Forest, scoring consistently for the club's reserve side, but never made a senior appearance for the club. Despite the offer of a trial at Swansea City, in July 1977, Bannon joined Southern Football League side Corby Town, making his debut in the first leg of a cup match, a 1–1 draw with Bedford Town. However, he failed to turn up to the second leg of the match which saw him handed a two-week suspension by the club and he would later be fined a weeks wages later in the season after failing to appear at a league match against Burton Albion. Bannon scored 11 goals in 38 matches for the club but, following a row with manager John Loughlan, was released in April 1978. Loughlan later stated: "On reflection it was probably the best thing I ever did for him [...] He was susceptible to any bad influence in the town and certain so-called friends did not help. They were forever trying to lead him astray". Loughlan would later send Bannon a congratulatory telegram on his return to the Football League in 1979.

=== Football League ===
Following his release, Bannon briefly played Gaelic football but soon returned to association football with Welsh club Ammanford Town and his impressive form in the opening months of the 1978–79 season, scoring 16 times by October, saw him join Bridgend Town. He again scored consistently and, in February 1979, he joined Football League Third Division side Carlisle United for a fee of £8,500. He spent four years with the Cumbrians, making his debut in a 2–1 defeat to Bury in February 1979, and won promotion to Division Two with the club during the 1981–82 season. In his final year with Carlisle, he spent a brief period on loan with Darlington in 1983 where he made three league appearances.

In 1983, Bannon joined Bristol Rovers and scored double figures in his first season at Eastville Stadium, including a goal in the team's 1984 Gloucestershire Cup final victory over local rivals Bristol City. The following season, Bannon spent short spells on loan at Cardiff City, making four appearances, and Plymouth Argyle where he made two substitute appearances in November in matches against Wigan Athletic and Walsall without scoring.

=== Greece ===
After a period playing for NAC Breda in the Netherlands, Bannon spent the 1987–88 Alpha Ethniki season with PAOK He played 20 matches and scored nine league goals, including a hat-trick on 14 February against Levadiakos, which made him the club's joint top scorer. At the end of the season, he moved on to Greek champions AEL. Their first foray into the European Cup was soon over. In the first round of the 1988–89 European Cup, they were drawn against Neuchâtel Xamax of Switzerland. They overcame the Swiss 2–1 in the first leg, but fell to the same scoreline away. The match went to penalties, and AEL lost 3–0 with Bannon missing the second kick. Bannon finished the league season with three goals from 11 appearances, and then returned home to Ireland.

=== Ireland ===
He made his League of Ireland debut for Cork City on 3 September 1989, the opening day of the 1989–90 season, against Drogheda United. Signed as a centre forward, Bannon went back to centre half because of Cork's injury problems, and he was playing in that position when he scored his first league goal, against Dundalk at Oriel Park on 5 November 1989. Former Cork player and manager Dave Barry included Bannon as a defender in his all-time Cork City eleven, selected in 2004.

Bannon played in Cork's first ever European game, against Torpedo Moscow in the 1989–90 European Cup Winners' Cup. Despite suffering from a virus, he played as the lone striker, and had Cork's only two chances – one header over the bar, one saved – as they lost 5–0 in Moscow. Bannon also played twice against Bayern Munich in the 1991–92 UEFA Cup. Overall, he made four appearances for Cork in Europe.

Bannon scored the only goal of the semi-final, against St Patrick's Athletic, to put Cork through to the 1992 FAI Cup Final. They lost 1–0 to Bohemians. In his last game for Cork, he scored the winning goal to win the 1992–93 League of Ireland Premier Division title at the RDS Arena.

He finished his playing career with Cobh Ramblers, and then assisted Mick Conroy with the running of a youth academy in Cork. Successful graduates include Ireland internationals Colin Healy, Damien Delaney and Liam Miller.

After spending 17 years working for the FAI, he died on 15 February 2016.

== Honours ==
Bristol Rovers

- Gloucestershire Cup winner: 1984

Cork City

- League of Ireland Premier Division winner: 1992–93

== Sources ==
- Dave Galvin; Gerry Desmond. Irish Football Handbook. ISBN 0-9517987-3-1.
