= 1987–88 Alpha Ethniki =

52nd season of top-tier football league in Greece

Alpha Ethniki
- Season: 1987–88
- Champions: AEL; 1st Greek title
- Relegated: Veria; Panserraikos; Panachaiki
- European Cup: AEL
- UEFA Cup: AEK Athens; PAOK
- Cup Winners' Cup: Panathinaikos
- Matches: 240
- Goals: 602 (2.51 per match)
- Top goalscorer: Henrik Nielsen (21 goals)

The 1987–88 Alpha Ethniki was the 52nd season of the highest football league of Greece. The season began on 6 September 1987 and ended on 15 May 1988. AEL won their first Greek title in its history. The season was notable as the only season where neither Panathinaikos or Olympiacos, by far the most successful and dominant clubs, finished in the top four.

The point system was: Win: 2 points - Draw: 1 point.

== Teams ==
Promoted from 1986–87 Beta Ethniki	Relegated from 1986–87 Alpha Ethniki
Panachaiki; Panserraikos; Levadiakos	Doxa Drama; Apollon Athens; PAS Giannina

Location of teams in 1987–88 Alpha Ethniki

== League table ==
Pos	Team	Pld	W	D	L	GF	GA	GD	Pts	Qualification or relegation
1	AEL (C)	30	18	7	5	51	22	+29	43	Qualification for European Cup first round
2	AEK Athens	30	15	10	5	51	31	+20	40	Qualification for UEFA Cup first round
3	PAOK	30	17	5	8	60	27	+33	39	Qualification for UEFA Cup first round
4	OFI	30	17	3	10	54	41	+13	37	
5	Panathinaikos	30	15	6	9	47	34	+13	36	Qualification for Cup Winners' Cup first round
6	Iraklis	30	13	8	9	42	32	+10	34	
7	Ethnikos Piraeus	30	12	8	10	27	28	−1	32	
8	Olympiacos	30	9	13	8	39	41	−2	31	
9	Aris	30	11	5	14	39	41	−2	27	
10	Panionios	30	8	10	12	32	34	−2	26	
11	Apollon Kalamarias	30	7	10	13	23	39	−16	24	
12	Diagoras	30	7	9	14	25	38	−13	23	
13	Levadiakos	30	7	9	14	32	46	−14	23	
14	Veria (R)	30	7	9	14	24	53	−29	23	Relegation to Beta Ethniki
15	Panserraikos (R)	30	8	5	17	24	42	−18	21	Relegation to Beta Ethniki
16	Panachaiki (Note: Panachaiki were deducted 1 point.) (R)	30	7	7	16	32	53	−21	20	Relegation to Beta Ethniki

Source: RSSSF
Rules for classification: 1st points; 2nd head-to-head points; 3rd head-to-head goal difference; 4th decision match.
(C) Champions; (R) Relegated

== Results ==
Home \ Away	AEK	AEL	APK	ARIS	DIA	ETH	IRA	LEV	OFI	OLY	PNC	PAO	PAN	PNS	PAOK	VER
AEK Athens		2–1	2–0	2–1	4–0	2–0	1–0	3–0	2–1	2–0	3–2	2–2	1–1	2–1	1–0	7–1
AEL	2–0		1–0	3–1	1–0	3–0	1–0	3–0	3–1	3–1	4–0	2–1	3–0	4–1	1–1	2–0
Apollon Kalamarias	2–2	0–1		0–0	1–0	1–1	2–0	2–0	2–0	0–0	0–0	1–0	1–1	5–0	0–1	2–0
Aris	4–1	0–0	1–1		4–0	1–0	1–1	3–0	3–1	1–2	2–1	2–0	2–1	2–1	1–2	2–0
Diagoras	0–0	0–0	2–0	1–3		0–0	0–0	2–0	1–1	0–0	4–0	1–2	1–0	0–2	0–3	1–0
Ethnikos Piraeus	0–3	0–0	1–1	3–1	4–2		1–0	2–1	0–1	0–0	3–1	1–0	1–0	0–0	1–0	1–0
Iraklis	0–0	1–0	2–0	3–1	2–3	1–1		1–1	5–1	3–2	2–0	0–0	0–3	2–0	1–0	3–1
Levadiakos	1–1	1–0	2–0	2–0	1–1	0–2	0–1		1–1	1–1	3–1	2–1	1–1	1–3	4–2	3–1
OFI	3–0	3–1	4–0	4–0	2–1	2–0	3–2	1–0		1–2	5–1	2–1	1–0	1–0	2–2	4–1
Olympiacos	2–2	2–2	1–1	2–1	0–0	4–1	1–2	1–1	2–1		2–0	1–4	1–1	3–0	2–1	2–0
Panachaiki	2–1	1–3	3–0	2–0	2–2	0–1	3–3	1–1	3–0	1–1		1–2	2–1	0–2 (Note: Panachaiki-Panserraikos 4-2, awarded 0-2 because Panachaiki used Genas who was under yellow cards.)	0–2	2–2
Panathinaikos	1–1	4–1	2–0	2–1	1–0	1–0	1–1	2–1	2–5	1–1	2–0		6–2	1–0	2–1	4–0
Panionios	1–1	0–1	5–0	2–0	2–0	1–0	2–1	2–1	1–2	2–0	0–0	0–1		1–1	1–1	1–1
Panserraikos	0–1	0–0	3–0	1–0	0–2	1–3	1–2	1–0	0–1	2–2	0–1	1–0	2–0		0–1	0–0
PAOK	2–2	0–0	3–0	3–1	1–0	1–0	0–2	4–1	4–0	6–1	2–0	4–1	2–0	5–0		5–1
Veria	1–0	2–5	1–1	0–0	2–1	0–0	2–1	2–2	1–0	1–0	0–2	0–0	0–0	2–1	2–1	

Source: RSSSF
Legend: Blue = home team win; Yellow = draw; Red = away team win.

== Top scorers ==
Rank	Player	Club	Goals
1	(Denmark) Henrik Nielsen	AEK Athens	21
2	(Greece) Michalis Ziogas	AEL	16
2	(Greece) Thomas Mavros	Panionios	16
4	(Greece) Vasilis Dimitriadis	Aris	12
4	(Greece) Dimos Kavouras	Levadiakos	12
6	(Greece) Christos Dimopoulos	Panathinaikos	11
7	(Greece) Sakis Anastasiadis	Iraklis	10
7	(Greece) Sakis Moustakidis	Olympiacos	10
7	(Greece) Ioannis Samaras	OFI	10
7	(Greece) Stefanos Borbokis	PAOK	10

== Attendances ==
Olympiacos drew the highest average home attendance in the 1987–88 Alpha Ethniki.

#	Team	Average attendance
1	Olympiacos	38,604
2	Panathinaikos	23,634
3	PAOK	17,286
4	AEK Athens	16,811
5	AEL	12,951
6	Aris	10,158
7	Iraklis	8,641
8	OFI	8,040
9	Ethnikos Piraeus	7,846
10	Panachaiki	7,479
11	Panionios	6,879
12	Panserraikos	6,559
13	Levadiakos	4,537
14	Veria	3,895
15	Apollon Kalamarias	3,443
16	Diagoras	3,336
