= Antonis Kasdovasilis =

Greek footballer

Personal information
- Full name: Antonios Kasdovasilis
- Date of birth: 13 January 1958 (age 68)
- Place of birth: Chrysoupoli, Greece
- Height: 1.85 m (6 ft 1 in)
- Position: Defender

Senior career*
Years	Team	Apps	(Gls)
–1980	Pandramaikos		
1980–1985	Doxa Drama		
1985–1987	Olympiacos		
1987–1991	Levadiakos		
1991–1994	Doxa Vyronas		

International career
1982	Greece	1	(0)

Managerial career
- 2003–2004: Akratitos
- 2005–2006: Acharnaikos
- 2008: Vyzas
- 2012: Doxa Drama (caretaker)
- 2014: Nestos Chrysoupoli
- 2016–2017: Iraklis (technical director)
- 2017–2018: Doxa Drama (team manager)
- 2018–2019: Doxa Drama (youth)
- 2020–2021: Karaiskakis (technical director)
- 2022–2023: Nestos Chrysoupoli (technical director)
- * Club domestic league appearances and goals

Antonis Kasdovasilis (Greek: Αντώνης Κασδοβασίλης; born 13 January 1958) is a Greek retired football defender and later manager.
