= Sergio González (footballer, born 1961) =

Argentine footballer (1961–2020)

Personal information
- Full name: Sergio Nelson González
- Date of birth: 21 March 1961
- Place of birth: Córdoba, Argentina
- Date of death: 13 July 2020 (aged 59)
- Place of death: Córdoba, Argentina
- Position: Midfielder

Senior career*
Years	Team	Apps	(Gls)
1981–1982	Estudiantes de Río Cuarto	16	(0)
1983–1985	Instituto	59	(4)
1985–1987	Royal Antwerp	40	(8)
1987–1988	→ Aris (loan)	27	(6)
1988–1989	Argentinos Juniors	19	(2)
1990–1991	Atlético Morelia	26	(5)
1991–1992	Cobras	24	(9)
1992–1993	Atlante	5	(1)
1993–1997	Instituto	100	(19)
1994–1995	Banfield	16	(0)
1997–1998	Chaco For Ever	9	(0)
Total		325	(54)
- * Club domestic league appearances and goals

Sergio Nelson González (21 March 1961 – 13 July 2020) was an Argentine professional footballer who played as a midfielder.

== Career ==
González joined Belgian First Division side Royal Antwerp in 1985, he went on to score eight goals in forty appearances between 1985 and 1987. During his years with Antwerp, he was loaned out for the 1987–88 Belgian First Division season to Aris of the Greek Alpha Ethniki. Six goals in twenty-seven matches followed. In 1990, González entered Mexican football by joining Atlético Morelia, prior to moves with fellow Mexican Primera División clubs Cobras and Atlante from 1991 to 1993; he suffered relegation with Cobras, while he won the title with Atlante. In 1993, González returned to Argentina to play for Instituto in Primera B Nacional.

In four years with Instituto, González made one hundred league appearances for the club and scored nineteen goals. After departing Instituto in 1997, González subsequently joined Chaco For Ever with whom he featured nine times. Throughout his career, González also played for Argentinos Juniors, Banfield and also had a secondary spell with Instituto in the Argentine Primera División.

== Death ==
Gonzalez died on 13 July 2020 after suffering a heart attack while exercising.

== Honours ==
Atlante

- Mexican Primera División: 1992–93
