= Panathinaikos–PAOK rivalry =

Rivalry between Greek association football clubs

Panathinaikos and PAOK rivalry
- Location: Athens – Thessaloniki, Greece
- Teams: Panathinaikos; PAOK
- First meeting: 8 February 1931; Panhellenic Championship; PAOK 1–3 Panathinaikos
- Latest meeting: 6 September 2026; Super League Greece; Panathinaikos 3–1 PAOK
- Next meeting: TBD
- Stadiums: Leoforos Alexandras Stadium/Athens Olympic Stadium (Panathinaikos); Toumba Stadium (PAOK)

Statistics
- Total meetings: 214
- Most wins: Panathinaikos (99)
- Most player appearances: Giorgos Koudas (PAOK) (38)
- Top scorer: Krzysztof Warzycha (Panathinaikos) (11 goals)
- All-time series: Panathinaikos: 99; Drawn: 44; PAOK: 71
- Largest victory: 28 June 1931; Panhellenic Championship; Panathinaikos 7–1 PAOK
- Longest win streak: 6 games Panathinaikos (1959–1961)
- Longest unbeaten streak: 10 games Panathinaikos (1962–1967)
- Current win streak: 1 game Panathinaikos (2026–present)
- Current unbeaten streak: 1 game Panathinaikos (2026–present)

The rivalry between Panathinaikos and PAOK is the football rivalry between two of the most popular teams of the two biggest cities in Greece, the capital of Athens and Thessaloniki. In general terms, there is mutual respect between the two clubs and the rivalry has been focused mainly on the pitch throughout the decades. The Panathinaikos vs PAOK match is the most-played in Greek Alpha Ethniki/Super League history (1959–present) at 162 games (up until the 2025–26 season).

== Statistics ==
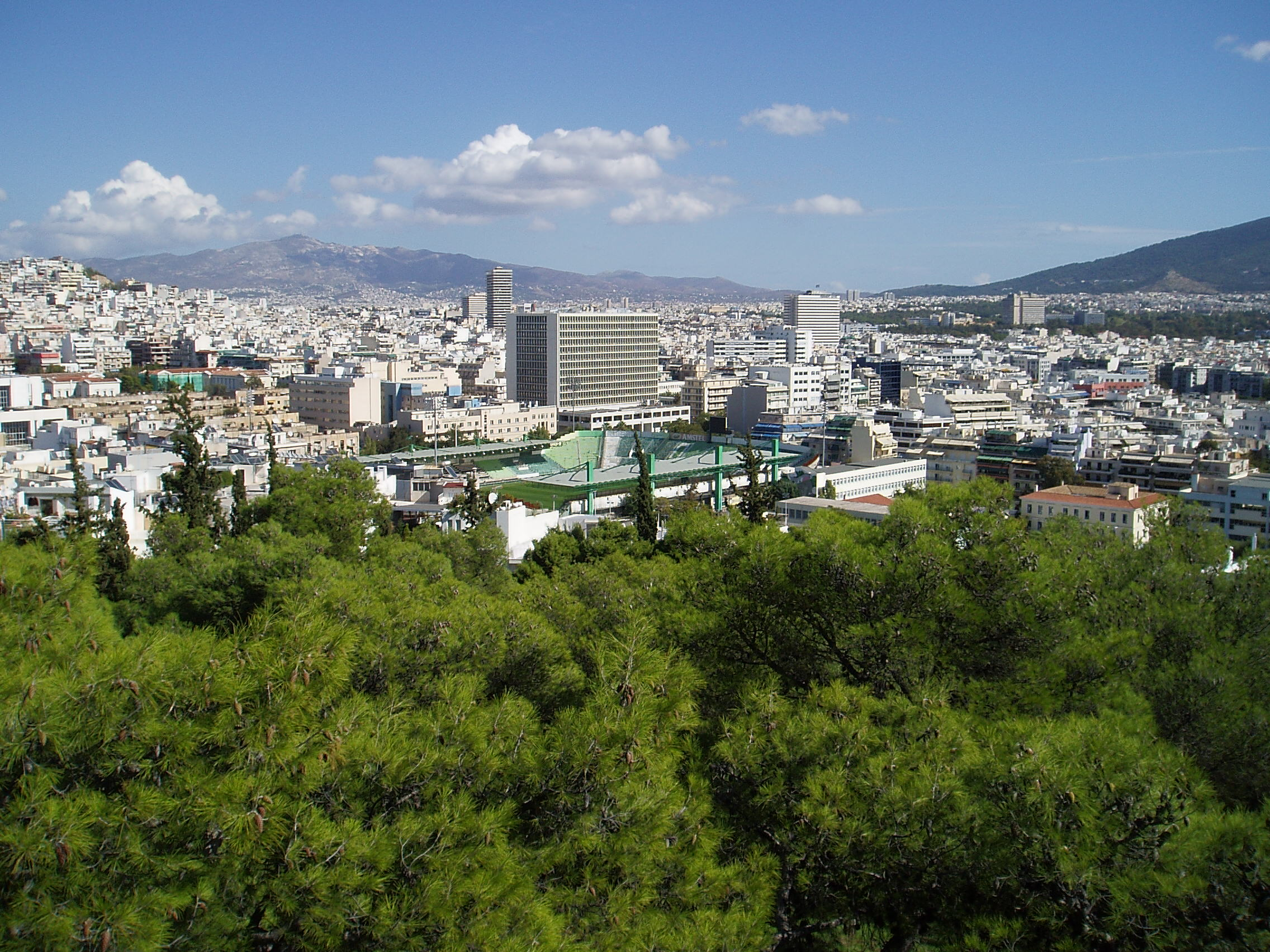
Leoforos Alexandras Stadium, home of Panathinaikos

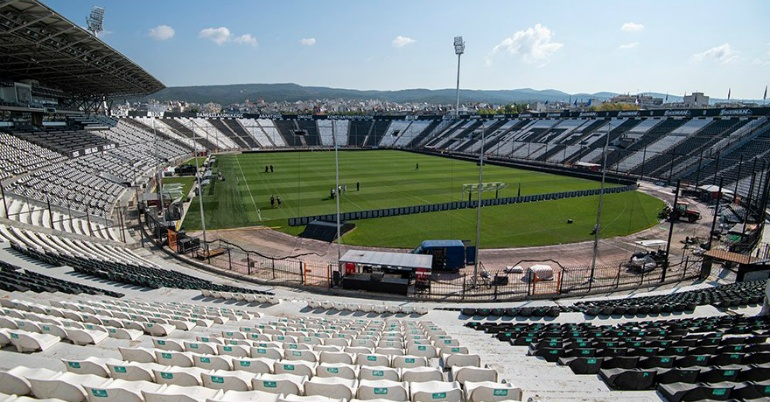
Toumba Stadium, home of PAOK

=== Head-to-head ===
	Panathinaikos wins	Draws	PAOK wins
Panhellenic Championship (1927–1959)
At Panathinaikos home	8	2	0
At PAOK home	5	1	4
Total	13	3	4
Alpha Ethniki / Super League (1959–present)
At Panathinaikos home	51	20	11
At PAOK home	22	18	41
Total	73	38	52
Greek Cup
At Panathinaikos home	6	2	3
At PAOK home	3	1	11
Neutral field	3	0	1
Total	12	3	15
Greek League Cup
At Panathinaikos home	0	0	0
At PAOK home	1	0	0
Total	1	0	0
Official Matches Total
214	99	44	71

== Matches list ==
=== Panhellenic Championship (1927–1959) ===
	Panathinaikos – PAOK in Athens				PAOK – Panathinaikos in Thessaloniki
Season	Date	Venue	Score	Att.	Date	Venue	Score	Att.
1930–31	28 June 1931	Leoforos Alexandras Stadium	7–1	N/A	8 February 1931	Aris Old Stadium	1–3	N/A
1931–32	10 July 1932	Leoforos Alexandras Stadium	2–1	N/A	6 March 1932	Aris Old Stadium	3–1	N/A
1935–36	8 December 1935	Leoforos Alexandras Stadium	1–0	N/A	7 January 1936	PAOK Old Stadium	1–6	N/A
1936–37	11 April 1937	Leoforos Alexandras Stadium	2–0	N/A	30 May 1937	PAOK Old Stadium	2–0^{1}	N/A
1953–54	4 July 1954	Leoforos Alexandras Stadium	1–1	N/A	23 May 1954	PAOK Old Stadium	0–1	N/A
1954–55	2 March 1955	Leoforos Alexandras Stadium	3–2	N/A	3 July 1955	PAOK Old Stadium	0–2	N/A
1955–56	6 June 1956	Leoforos Alexandras Stadium	3–1	N/A	8 April 1956	PAOK Old Stadium	1–0	N/A
1956–57	19 May 1957	Leoforos Alexandras Stadium	3–1	N/A	13 February 1957	PAOK Old Stadium	0–1	N/A
1957–58	23 March 1958	Leoforos Alexandras Stadium	1–1	N/A	29 June 1958	PAOK Old Stadium	2–2	N/A
1958–59	14 June 1959	Leoforos Alexandras Stadium	3–0	N/A	8 March 1959	PAOK Old Stadium	1–0	N/A

^{1} PAOK were awarded a 2–0 walkover.

=== Alpha Ethniki / Super League Greece (1959–present) ===
	Panathinaikos – PAOK in Athens				PAOK – Panathinaikos in Thessaloniki
Season	Date	Venue	Score	Att.	Date	Venue	Score	Att.
1959–60	7 February 1960	Leoforos Alexandras Stadium	1–0	11,441	17 July 1960	Toumba Stadium	0–2	4,962
1960–61	19 February 1961	Leoforos Alexandras Stadium	2–0	N/A	2 October 1960	Toumba Stadium	0–1	N/A
1961–62	17 December 1961	Leoforos Alexandras Stadium	3–1	22,449	20 May 1962	Toumba Stadium	2–1	N/A
1962–63	3 December 1962	Leoforos Alexandras Stadium	2–1	24,229	28 April 1963	Toumba Stadium	1–1	20,131
1963–64	19 April 1964	Leoforos Alexandras Stadium	4–0	18,374	15 December 1963	Toumba Stadium	0–1	13,874
1964–65	11 October 1964	Leoforos Alexandras Stadium	2–0	24,373	14 February 1965	Toumba Stadium	0–0	8,543
1965–66	23 January 1966	Leoforos Alexandras Stadium	2–0	15,901	8 May 1966	Toumba Stadium	1–3	21,020
1966–67	16 April 1967	Leoforos Alexandras Stadium	0–0	20,449	26 December 1966	Toumba Stadium	0–0	18,870
1967–68	22 April 1968	Leoforos Alexandras Stadium	1–0	19,803	24 December 1967	Toumba Stadium	2–1	18,886
1968–69	1 June 1969	Leoforos Alexandras Stadium	2–0	22,787	12 January 1969	Toumba Stadium	1–2	26,572
1969–70	28 September 1969	Leoforos Alexandras Stadium	1–1	22,985	8 February 1970	Toumba Stadium	0–1	33,136
1970–71	17 January 1971	Leoforos Alexandras Stadium	3–0	18,730	6 June 1971	Toumba Stadium	3–2	18,452
1971–72	9 January 1972	Leoforos Alexandras Stadium	1–0	25,968	28 May 1972	Toumba Stadium	1–0	40,051
1972–73	18 March 1973	Leoforos Alexandras Stadium	0–2^{1}	—	29 October 1972	Toumba Stadium	1–0	39,500
1973–74	10 March 1974	Leoforos Alexandras Stadium	3–2	24,877	21 October 1973	Toumba Stadium	1–1	42,318
1974–75	1 December 1974	Leoforos Alexandras Stadium	1–1	23,886	5 April 1975	Toumba Stadium	2–0	30,418
1975–76	15 February 1976	Leoforos Alexandras Stadium	1–1	24,646	5 October 1975	Toumba Stadium	3–1	18,615
1976–77	16 January 1977	Leoforos Alexandras Stadium	0–0	23,684	12 June 1977	Toumba Stadium	0–0	44,705
1977–78	11 September 1977	Leoforos Alexandras Stadium	0–0	22,572	22 January 1978	Toumba Stadium	3–1	22,061
1978–79	24 December 1978	Leoforos Alexandras Stadium	2–2	11,407	25 April 1979	Toumba Stadium	3–0	27,656
1979–80	18 November 1979	Leoforos Alexandras Stadium	0–0	20,007	9 March 1980	Toumba Stadium	0–2	29,992
1980–81	22 March 1981	Georgios Kamaras Stadium	0–0	11,086	26 October 1980	Kleanthis Vikelidis Stadium	4–2	18,131
1981–82	7 March 1982	Leoforos Alexandras Stadium	2–1	24,000	25 October 1981	Toumba Stadium	2–0	20,257
1982–83	26 June 1983	Leoforos Alexandras Stadium	2–0	6,704	6 February 1983	Toumba Stadium	2–0	19,164
1983–84	6 November 1983	Leoforos Alexandras Stadium	0–0	24,400	18 March 1984	Toumba Stadium	1–0	34,256
1984–85	20 January 1985	Athens Olympic Stadium	0–1	74,043	16 June 1985	Toumba Stadium	1–1	35,914
1985–86	2 March 1986	Athens Olympic Stadium	5–0	46,961	20 October 1985	Toumba Stadium	0–1	21,448
1986–87	1 November 1986	Athens Olympic Stadium	0–0	29,663	15 March 1987	Toumba Stadium	2–3	22,166
1987–88	1 November 1987	Athens Olympic Stadium	2–1	18,552	28 February 1988	Toumba Stadium	4–1	36,305
1988–89	12 March 1989	Leoforos Alexandras Stadium	1–0	13,771	13 November 1988	Toumba Stadium	1–0	25,291
1989–90	27 May 1990	Athens Olympic Stadium	2–2	32,141	21 January 1990	Toumba Stadium	2–1	25,100
1990–91	23 September 1990	Athens Olympic Stadium	3–0^{2}	31,314	17 February 1991	Toumba Stadium	1–1	15,303
1991–92	31 May 1992	Athens Olympic Stadium	5–1	8,236	19 January 1992	Toumba Stadium	1–0	21,838
1992–93	7 March 1993	Athens Olympic Stadium	5–0	17,903	25 October 1992	Toumba Stadium	1–1	8,054
1993–94	9 April 1994	Athens Olympic Stadium	2–0	4,593	11 December 1993	Toumba Stadium	3–1	6,728
1994–95	30 October 1994	Athens Olympic Stadium	3–0	22,883	19 March 1995	Toumba Stadium	2–0	21,114
1995–96	10 December 1995	Athens Olympic Stadium	2–0	10,179	5 May 1996	Toumba Stadium	0–1	13,832
1996–97	1 December 1996	Athens Olympic Stadium	5–0	4,873	26 March 1997	Toumba Stadium	1–0	13,110
1997–98	22 March 1998	Athens Olympic Stadium	3–1	10,432	16 November 1997	Toumba Stadium	2–1	16,877
1998–99	28 February 1999	Athens Olympic Stadium	0–1	21,237	20 September 1998	Toumba Stadium	2–0	12,996
1999–2000	3 October 1999	Athens Olympic Stadium	1–1	30,928	20 February 2000	Toumba Stadium	1–3	20,888
2000–01	10 March 2001	Leoforos Alexandras Stadium	5–2	9,914	18 November 2000	Toumba Stadium	2–2	12,978
2001–02	9 December 2001	Leoforos Alexandras Stadium	1–2	10,337	31 March 2002	Toumba Stadium	2–2	22,000
2002–03	26 January 2003	Leoforos Alexandras Stadium	1–0	13,620	25 August 2002	Toumba Stadium	4–1	26,800
2003–04	30 November 2003	Leoforos Alexandras Stadium	3–0	9,658	25 April 2004	Toumba Stadium	1–2	17,805
2004–05	29 December 2004	Leoforos Alexandras Stadium	2–1	11,001	8 May 2005	Toumba Stadium	1–1	17,845
2005–06	30 October 2005	Athens Olympic Stadium	1–0	21,538	11 March 2006	Toumba Stadium	0–1	Cl. doors
2006–07	24 September 2006	Athens Olympic Stadium	2–1	21,356	3 February 2007	Toumba Stadium	2–1	8,795
2007–08	29 September 2007	Leoforos Alexandras Stadium	2–0	10,048	27 January 2008	Toumba Stadium	0–1	19,000
2008–09	8 February 2009	Athens Olympic Stadium	3–0	26,430	19 October 2008	Toumba Stadium	0–0	25,795
2008–09	24 May 2009 (p-o)	Athens Olympic Stadium	4–1	14,673	10 May 2009 (p-o)	Toumba Stadium	0–1	27,703
2009–10	25 October 2009	Athens Olympic Stadium	2–1	19,875	21 February 2010	Toumba Stadium	2–1	23,104
2010–11	16 October 2010	Athens Olympic Stadium	1–0	Cl. doors	6 February 2011	Toumba Stadium	0–1	22,008
2010–11	22 May 2011 (p-o)	Athens Olympic Stadium	1–0	19,824	8 May 2011 (p-o)	Toumba Stadium	2–1	19,391
2011–12	4 March 2012	Athens Olympic Stadium	0–2	Cl. doors	30 October 2011	Toumba Stadium	1–3	19,002
2011–12	13 May 2012 (p-o)	Athens Olympic Stadium	2–0	3,012	10 May 2012 (p-o)	Toumba Stadium	1–0	11,484
2012–13	18 November 2012	Athens Olympic Stadium	2–0	13,511	17 March 2013	Toumba Stadium	2–0	19,856
2013–14	9 February 2014	Leoforos Alexandras Stadium	2–1	11,113	6 October 2013	Toumba Stadium	2–1	24,633
2013–14	4 May 2014 (p-o)	Leoforos Alexandras Stadium	1–1	11,713	17 May 2014 (p-o)	Toumba Stadium	1–0	Cl.doors
2014–15	8 March 2015	Leoforos Alexandras Stadium	4–3	Cl. doors	9 November 2014	Toumba Stadium	1–2	24,905
2014–15	31 May 2015 (p-o)	Leoforos Alexandras Stadium	2–0	12,964	27 May 2015 (p-o)	Toumba Stadium	0–1	9,473
2015–16	21 February 2016	Leoforos Alexandras Stadium	2–2	8,318	25 October 2015	Toumba Stadium	3–1	15,374
2015–16	15 May 2016 (p-o)	Leoforos Alexandras Stadium	1–1	8,178	31 May 2016 (p-o)	Toumba Stadium	1–1	20,156
2016–17	4 December 2016	Leoforos Alexandras Stadium	1–0	5,221	9 Αpril 2017	Toumba Stadium	3–0	17,209
2016–17	17 May 2017 (p-o)	Leoforos Alexandras Stadium	0–3^{3}	4,111	31 May 2017 (p-o)	Toumba Stadium	2–3	12,362
2017–18	29 April 2018	Leoforos Alexandras Stadium	0–3	8,649	10 December 2017	Toumba Stadium	4–0	26,140
2018–19	3 March 2019	Athens Olympic Stadium	0–2	9,453	29 October 2018	Toumba Stadium	2–0	20,389
2019–20	2 February 2020	Athens Olympic Stadium	2–0	19,133	3 November 2019	Toumba Stadium	2–2	22,466
2019–20	13 June 2020 (p-o)	Athens Olympic Stadium	0–0	Cl. doors	8 July 2020 (p-o)	Toumba Stadium	0–0	Cl. doors
2020–21	14 March 2021	Leoforos Alexandras Stadium	2–1	Cl. doors	20 December 2020	Toumba Stadium	2–1	Cl. doors
2020–21	4 April 2021 (p-o)	Leoforos Alexandras Stadium	3–0	Cl. doors	25 April 2021 (p-o)	Toumba Stadium	0–0	Cl. doors
2021–22	7 November 2021	Leoforos Alexandras Stadium	1–3	12,792	6 February 2022	Toumba Stadium	2–1	Cl. doors
2021–22	3 April 2022 (p-o)	Leoforos Alexandras Stadium	2–1	9,416	17 May 2022 (p-o)	Toumba Stadium	2–0	7,437
2022–23	22 January 2023	Leoforos Alexandras Stadium	0–3	13,612	2 October 2022	Toumba Stadium	1–2	21,074
2022–23	3 May 2023 (p-o)	Leoforos Alexandras Stadium	1–1	13,491	23 April 2023 (p-o)	Toumba Stadium	1–2	12,880
2023–24	1 October 2023	Leoforos Alexandras Stadium	2–2	11,530	28 January 2024	Toumba Stadium	2–1	Cl.doors
2023–24	31 March 2024 (p-o)	Leoforos Alexandras Stadium	2–3	13,209	15 May 2024 (p-o)	Toumba Stadium	4–1	22,281
2024–25	5 January 2025	Athens Olympic Stadium	2–1	Cl. doors	15 September 2024	Toumba Stadium	0–0	18,511
2024–25	13 April 2025 (p-o)	Athens Olympic Stadium	3–1	14,350	27 April 2025 (p-o)	Toumba Stadium	2–1	18,275
2025–26	9 November 2025	Leoforos Alexandras Stadium	2–1	11,114	21 December 2025	Toumba Stadium	2–0	22,938
2025–26	17 May 2026 (p-o)	Leoforos Alexandras Stadium	2–2	Cl.doors	5 April 2026 (p-o)	Toumba Stadium	0–0	23,485
2026–27	6 September 2026	Athens Olympic Stadium	3–1			Toumba Stadium	–

^{1} PAOK were awarded a 0–2 walkover.

^{2} Match suspended at 77th minute.

^{3} Match suspended at 55th minute (score: 1–0). PAOK were awarded a 0–3 win.

=== Greek Cup ===
Season	Round	Panathinaikos – PAOK				PAOK – Panathinaikos				Winner
Season	Round	Date	Venue	Atten.	Score	Date	Venue	Atten.	Score	Winner
1948–49	Semi-finals					10–04–1949	PAOK Old Stadium	N/A	0–1	PAO
1950–51	Semi-finals					28–02–1951	PAOK Old Stadium	N/A	1–0	PAOK
1954–55	Final	12–06–1955	Leoforos Alexandras Stadium	6,729	2–0					PAO
1967–68	Quarter-finals					07–07–1968	Toumba Stadium	12,263	1–2 (a.e.t.); susp.^{*}	PAO
1970–71	Quarter-finals					05–05–1971	Toumba Stadium	28,830	3–2	PAOK
1971–72	Final	05–07–1972	Karaiskakis Stadium	34,831	1–2					PAOK
1972–73	Quarter-finals					18–04–1973	Toumba Stadium	38,869	2–0	PAOK
1976–77	Final	22–06–1977	Karaiskakis Stadium	28,490	2–1					PAO
1981–82	Semi-finals	02–06–1982	Leoforos Alexandras Stadium	24,000	2–0	19–05–1982	Toumba Stadium	38,774	1–0	PAO
1984–85	Semi-finals	22–05–1985	Athens Olympic Stadium	48,104	2–0	05–06–1985	Toumba Stadium	40,561	4–0	PAOK
1990–91	Semi-finals	03–04–1991	Athens Olympic Stadium	18,607	2–0	24–04–1991	Toumba Stadium	25,918	1–0	PAO
1993–94	Round of 16	15–12–1993	Athens Olympic Stadium	3,532	0–0	29–12–1993	Toumba Stadium	14,690	0–0 (a.e.t.); 4–5 (p)	PAO
2006–07	Quarter-finals	31–01–2007	Athens Olympic Stadium	23,747	3–1 (a.e.t.)	17–01–2007	Toumba Stadium	13,924	2–1	PAO
2013–14	Final	26–04–2014	Athens Olympic Stadium	44,356	4–1					PAO
2016–17	Semi-finals	12–04–2017	Leoforos Alexandras Stadium	N/A	2–0	27–04–2017	Toumba Stadium	N/A	4–0	PAOK
2019–20	Quarter-finals	12–02–2020	Athens Olympic Stadium	N/A	0–1	05–02–2020	Toumba Stadium	N/A	2–0	PAOK
2021–22	Final	21–05–2022	Athens Olympic Stadium	45,409	1–0					PAO
2022–23	Quarter-finals	26–01–2023	Leoforos Alexandras Stadium	N/A	1–1	18–01–2023	Toumba Stadium	N/A	2–0	PAOK
2023–24	Semi-finals	21–02–2024	Leoforos Alexandras Stadium	N/A	1–2 (a.e.t.); 6–5 (p)	14–02–2024	Toumba Stadium	N/A	0–1	PAO
2025–26	Semi-finals	04–02–2026	Leoforos Alexandras Stadium	N/A	0–1	11–02–2026	Toumba Stadium	N/A	2–0	PAOK

^{*} Match suspended at 115th minute.

• Series won: Panathinaikos 11, PAOK 9.

=== Greek League Cup ===
Season	Round	Date	Venue	Match	Atten.	Score
1989–90	First round	31–01–1990	Toumba Stadium	PAOK – Panathinaikos	Cl. doors	0–2

=== Friendly matches ===
Date	Venue	Match	Score
13–04–1930	Iraklis Old Stadium	PAOK – Panathinaikos	1–4
30–04–1933	Leoforos Alexandras Stadium	Panathinaikos – PAOK	3–3
10–06–1940	Leoforos Alexandras Stadium	Panathinaikos – PAOK	3–1
11–09–1953	Leoforos Alexandras Stadium	Panathinaikos – PAOK	1–1^{^}
13–09–1959	Toumba Stadium	PAOK – Panathinaikos	2–1
17–10–1965	Leoforos Alexandras Stadium	Panathinaikos – PAOK	0–1
18–03–1973	Leoforos Alexandras Stadium	Panathinaikos – PAOK	3–3
08–09–1974	Toumba Stadium	PAOK – Panathinaikos	1–1
20–08–1975	Leoforos Alexandras Stadium	Panathinaikos – PAOK	1–0^{*}
21–08–1975	Leoforos Alexandras Stadium	Panathinaikos – PAOK	1–1
31–08–1975	Toumba Stadium	PAOK – Panathinaikos	2–3
08–09–1976	Toumba Stadium	PAOK – Panathinaikos	2–0
19–09–1976	Leoforos Alexandras Stadium	Panathinaikos – PAOK	1–2
16–09–1979	Toumba Stadium	PAOK – Panathinaikos	5–1
28–08–1983	Leoforos Alexandras Stadium	Panathinaikos – PAOK	2–0
28–08–1985	Athens Olympic Stadium	Panathinaikos – PAOK	2–0
24–08–1986	Toumba Stadium	PAOK – Panathinaikos	1–0
23–08–1987	Athens Olympic Stadium	Panathinaikos – PAOK	4–2
28–12–1998	Athens Olympic Stadium	Panathinaikos – PAOK	1–0
05–09–2020	Grigoris Lambrakis Stadium	Panathinaikos – PAOK	0–1

^{^}Game abandonded in the 85th minute after the PAOK players refused to continue in protest of a penalty awarded to Panathinaikos.

^{*}Game was suspended in the 50th minute due to a heavy storm.
