= Paschalis Seretis =

Greek footballer

Personal information
- Date of birth: 7 June 1967 (age 59)
- Place of birth: Serres, Greece
- Height: 1.79 m (5 ft 10 in)
- Positions: Striker; midfielder

Senior career*
Years	Team	Apps	(Gls)
1986–1989	PAOK	15	(0)
1986–1987	→ Xanthi (loan)		
1989–1990	Apollon Kalamarias	16	(1)
1990–1991	Xanthi	25	(1)
1991–1993	Doxa Drama	19	(1)
1993–1997	SC Freiburg	36	(1)
1997–1998	Energie Cottbus	3	(0)
- * Club domestic league appearances and goals

Paschalis Seretis (Greek: Πασχάλης Σερέτης; born 7 June 1967) is a Greek former professional footballer who played as a striker or midfielder.

== Career ==
Born in Serres, Seretis began playing youth football with a club in Ampelokipoi, Thessaloniki. Soon after, he was signed to PAOK FC's youth academy and would turn professional with the club at age 18.

== Honours ==
- Bundesliga 3rd place: 1995.
