= Peter Skouras =

Greek-American soccer player and coach

Personal information
- Full name: Peter N. Skouras
- Date of birth: March 21, 1963 (age 63)
- Place of birth: New York, New York, United States
- Position: Midfielder

Youth career
- 1978–1980: Brighton & Hove Albion Apprentice Professional
- 1978: United States Youth National Team U-15 Selection
- 1980: United States Youth National Team U-20 Selection

Senior career*
Years	Team	Apps	(Gls)
1980	California Sunshine		
1980–1984	San Diego Sockers (NASL)	71	(8)
1984–1985	Olympiacos	2	
1986	San Jose Earthquakes	8	
1986–1987	PAOK	2	
1987–1988	Diagoras	10	
1988–1989	Panserraikos	13	
1990	Los Angeles Heat	4	

Managerial career
- 1994: Buffalo Blizzard
- * Club domestic league appearances and goals

Peter N. Skouras (born March 21, 1963) is a retired Greek-American soccer midfielder who was the "First American Born Professional Soccer player to sign a contract in a European First Division." On December 15, 1984, Skouras signed a first team contract with Greek First Division power Olympiakos Piraeus pioneering the way for American professional soccer players to create careers in Europe and around the world.

Skouras' professional career in Europe began with the opportunity and exposure provided by the United States Soccer Federation's Youth National Team programs which began in England as a youth professional with Brighton & Hove Albion of the English First Division. Skouras played professionally in both the United States and Greece for over ten seasons.

== Player ==
In 1978, Skouras was selected by the United States Soccer Federation to participate in the prestigious Montigue, France International (U-15) youth tournament. Coached by Bill Muse and Lothar Osiander and captained by Skouras, the US played two scoreless games against Romania and Portugal before losing 5–0 to France and 1–0 to West Germany.

Upon his return to the United States, Skouras was identified by English 1st Division Club Brighton & Hove Albion, who were on tour in the United States. Brighton manager Alan Mullery offered Skouras a three-month trial at Brighton. After signing "apprentice forms" and spending one season with Brighton & Hove Albion's apprentice professional ranks, Skouras' work permit application was denied by the U.K. Home Office.

Peter Skouras returned to the United States and turned professional at the age of sixteen with the California Sunshine of the American Soccer League, making Skouras the youngest native born American professional soccer player of his time. In the fall of 1980 and at the conclusion of the CONCACAF qualifications of which the United States coached by Walt Chyzowich and assisted by Bob Gansler qualified for the Coca-Cola Youth World Cup in Australia, Skouras was once again the youngster on the United States U-20 squad. At the age of 17, Skouras was signed immediately by Ron Newman and the San Diego Sockers of the North American Soccer League making him the youngest native born North American in a league dominated by foreign international stars. Despite a major reconstruction knee surgery, Skouras survived and played two NASL indoor seasons, four NASL outdoor seasons and one Major Indoor Soccer League season with the Sockers while American players were being released on a daily basis.

In 1984 at 21 years of age, the North American Soccer League ceased operations and Skouras made the trip to West Germany to continue his ambitions and living. After multiple trials at Bundesliga clubs, Skouras finally landed a contract with Karlsruhe Sport Club. After observing Skouras, Werner Olk the Karlsruhe manager gave the "green light" for the acquisition of Skouras which officially made Skouras the "First American" to sign a European First Division contract. Ironically and in a matter of days, Skouras was transferred to Greek Super League power Olympiakos Piraeus with the confirmation of former Netherlands and current Manager Georg Keßler and United States National Team Manager Alketas Panagoulias. Skouras spent one year at Olympiakos (December 1984 – 1985) playing in a few matches. However, being selected week in and week out in the squads of 16 was not a simple feat in such a "massive club" as Olympiakos. Returning to the United States in 1986 and signing for a short period with the San Jose Earthquakes of the American Professional Soccer League (APSL), PAOK Thessaloniki of the Greek Super League signed Skouras under the direction of former Netherlands National Team Manager Thijs Libregts. Due to Skouras' physical style of play, injuries plagued Skouras throughout his stay in the Greek Sub-Capital. Skouras continued his footballing career in the Greek Super League with Diagoras Rhodes for the 1987–88 season, and in the Greek Second Professional Division with Panseraikos F.C. who in 1988–89 were promoted to the Greek Super League under the technical guidance of Athanasios Dokas. In 1990, Skouras returned to the United States and the Los Angeles Heat of the American Professional Soccer League. After a few number of matches, injury again plagued Skouras with a severely torn hamstring and would bring his playing career to an end. Skouras was 27 years of age.

== Coach ==
On September 16, 1994, the Buffalo Blizzard of the National Professional Soccer League hired Skouras as head coach. Due to serious health reasons, Skouras stepped down and was replaced by Brian May. Upon his return, in 1994 Skouras assisted the Hellenic Football Federation with "Scouting" data for then National Team Manager Alketas Panagoulias. Additionally, Skouras worked with numerous players both professional and youth on an individual level where fitness was concerned. In 1989, Skouras also "Scouted" for the California Youth Soccer Association-South (CYSA-S) while under the direction of former US National Team Coach, Steve Sampson who implemented an extensive youth player identification program in the Southern California area. Skouras possesses his United States Soccer Federation National B Coaching License.

== Education ==
Skouras graduated Cum Laude from Los Angeles City College within the field of Psychology, Addiction Studies. In Spring 2026, Skouras earned his Bachelor of Arts Degree at CSUDH within the Behavioral Sciences graduating Magna Cum Laude. Skouras has achieved the IC&RC CADC II/SUDCC Drug & SUDCC III Alcohol Counseling Certification and is offering his services within the field of Addiction.
