= 1986–87 Alpha Ethniki =

51st season of top-tier football league in Greece

Alpha Ethniki
- Season: 1986–87
- Champions: Olympiacos; 25th Greek title
- Relegated: Doxa Drama; Apollon Athens; PAS Giannina
- European Cup: Olympiacos
- UEFA Cup: Panathinaikos; Panionios
- Cup Winners' Cup: OFI
- Matches: 217
- Goals: 490 (2.26 per match)
- Top goalscorer: Nikos Anastopoulos (16 goals)

The 1986–87 Alpha Ethniki was the 51st season of the highest football league of Greece. The season began on 7 September 1986 and ended on 7 June 1987. Olympiacos won their 25th Greek title and their first one in four years. The championship was marked by the strike declared by 12 clubs in the last three matchdays of the championship. As a result, most of the clubs did not come to the last matches of the championship and were punished by deducting 6 points. The clubs that did not joined the strike were Olympiacos, Panathinaikos, OFI and Panionios, which finished at the first four places of the standings.

The point system was: Win: 2 points - Draw: 1 point.

== Teams ==
Promoted from 1985–86 Beta Ethniki	Relegated from 1985–86 Alpha Ethniki
Diagoras; Veria	Panserraikos; Panachaiki

Location of teams in 1986–87 Alpha Ethniki

== League table ==
Pos	Team	Pld	W	D	L	GF	GA	GD	Pts	Qualification or relegation
1	Olympiacos (C)	30	22	5	3	54	24	+30	49	Qualification for European Cup first round
2	Panathinaikos	30	15	9	6	46	30	+16	39	Qualification for UEFA Cup first round
3	OFI	30	17	4	9	44	27	+17	38	Qualification for Cup Winners' Cup first round
4	Panionios	30	11	11	8	36	22	+14	33	Qualification for UEFA Cup first round
5	PAOK	30	13	9	8	39	23	+16	29	
6	Iraklis	30	13	5	12	34	32	+2	25	
7	AEK Athens	30	10	8	12	31	26	+5	19	
8	AEL	30	10	5	15	24	31	−7	19	
9	Veria	30	10	5	15	30	43	−13	19	
10	Ethnikos Piraeus	30	8	8	14	32	40	−8	18	
11	Aris	30	10	4	16	26	30	−4	18	
12	Apollon Kalamarias	30	8	7	15	21	35	−14	17	
13	Diagoras	30	9	4	17	29	33	−4	16	
14	Doxa Drama (R)	30	6	9	15	29	36	−7	15	Relegation to Beta Ethniki
15	Apollon Athens (R)	30	6	8	16	21	40	−19	14	Relegation to Beta Ethniki
16	PAS Giannina (R)	30	5	7	18	14	38	−24	11	Relegation to Beta Ethniki

Source: RSSSF
Rules for classification: 1st points; 2nd head-to-head points; 3rd head-to-head goal difference; 4th decision match.
12 clubs went on strike in the last three matchdays. All the clubs exept Olympiacos, Panathinaikos, OFI and Panionios that did not joined the strike were punished, with a deduction of -6 points because they did not show up. AEK Athens had also -3 points because of a case of fixing games in the previous season.
(C) Champions; (R) Relegated

== Results ==
Home \ Away	AEK	AEL	APA	APK	ARIS	DIA	DOX	ETH	IRA	OFI	OLY	PAO	PAN	PAOK	PAS	VER
AEK Athens		1–0	2–2	2–0	1–0	0–0 (Note: Both clubs that went on strike, thus by decision of the HFF the final score was 0–0, but counted as a loss for each club.)	1–1	2–1	0–0	0–1	0–1	0–3	1–1	1–2	2–1	5–0
AEL	0–1		2–0	1–1	1–0	1–0	2–0	1–0	0–1	3–1	1–2	1–1	1–0	2–1	0–0	2–0
Apollon Athens	1–1	1–0		0–1	0–0	1–1	1–1	1–0	0–0	1–1	1–3	0–2	0–2	2–0	0–0	1–0
Apollon Kalamarias	0–2	0–2	4–1		1–5	0–0	1–0	1–1	1–3	1–0	0–1	2–0	0–2 (Note: Awarded 2–0 at the expense of the club that went on strike.)	0–0	1–0	0–0
Aris	1–3	2–0	0–1	1–1		2–1	2–0	0–0	1–0	2–0	2–2	1–0	0–0	0–1	1–0	0–1
Diagoras	0–0	1–0	2–1	0–0	2–3		3–0	2–3	1–2	3–0	0–1	2–0	1–0	2–1	3–0	3–0
Doxa Drama	1–1	0–0	0–0	4–0	0–0	1–1		2–2	0–1	2–0	0–0	1–3	1–0	1–2	2–0	3–0
Ethnikos Piraeus	1–0	0–0	0–0	1–0	1–0	2–0	1–4		0–0	1–0	0–2	0–1	0–3	0–0	0–0	4–1
Iraklis	1–3	5–2	1–0	2–1	2–0	1–0	3–1	4–3		0–2	0–2	0–2	1–1	1–1	2–0	0–1
OFI	1–0	3–1	1–0	3–0	3–1	3–0	3–2	2–0	2–0		4–1	1–1	2–1	1–1	3–0	2–0
Olympiacos	2–0	3–0	3–1	2–0	1–2	4–0	2–0	2–0	1–0	2–1		2–1	1–0	1–1	3–2	1–0
Panathinaikos	1–1	2–1	2–0	0–0	2–0	3–1	2–1	3–6	3–1	2–1	1–1		2–2	0–0	3–0	2–1
Panionios	1–1	2–0	5–1	0–1	3–0	1–0	0–0	1–1	1–0	0–0	1–3	0–0		2–0	3–0	3–1
PAOK	1–0	0–0	3–0	1–1	2–0	0–0	4–1	2–1	1–0	2–0	4–1	2–3	4–1		3–1	0–0
PAS Giannina	2–0	0–0	0–3	1–0	0–0	1–0	0–0	1–1	0–1	0–1	0–2	1–0	0–0	0–0		3–1
Veria	0–0	3–0	3–1	0–3	1–0	2–0	1–0	5–2	2–2	0–2	2–2	1–1	0–0	1–0	3–1	

Source: RSSSF
Legend: Blue = home team win; Yellow = draw; Red = away team win.

== Top scorers ==
Rank	Player	Club	Goals
1	(Greece) Nikos Anastopoulos	Olympiacos	16
2	(Greece) Dimitris Saravakos	Panathinaikos	13
2	(Greece) Giorgos Vlastos	OFI	13
2	(Bulgaria) Misho Vulchev	Doxa Drama	13
5	(Greece) Sakis Anastasiadis	Iraklis	10
5	(Greece) Panagiotis Tsalouchidis	Veria	10
7	(Greece) Georgios Skartados	PAOK	8
7	(Greece) Christos Dimopoulos	Panathinaikos	8
7	(Greece) Kostas Batsinilas	Panathinaikos	8
7	(Greece) Giorgos Christofis	Diagoras	8

== Attendances ==
Olympiacos drew the highest average home attendance in the 1986–87 Alpha Ethniki.

#	Team	Average attendance
1	Olympiacos	32,056
2	Panathinaikos	20,508
3	AEK Athens	16,270
4	PAOK	12,779
5	Aris	8,093
6	Iraklis	7,612
7	OFI	7,262
8	AEL	6,965
9	PAS Giannina	5,296
10	Panionios	5,227
11	Ethnikos Piraeus	4,697
12	Apollon Athens	4,189
13	Diagoras	4,102
14	Veria	3,962
15	Doxa Drama	3,477
16	Apollon Kalamarias	3,143
