= Levadia Municipal Stadium =

Multi-purpose stadium in Levadia, Greece

Levadia Municipal Stadium "Lambros Katsonis"
- Interactive map of Levadia Municipal Stadium "Lambros Katsonis"
- Location: Livadeia, Boeotia, Greece
- Coordinates: 38°26′9.23″N 22°52′58.24″E
- Operator: Levadiakos F.C.
- Capacity: 5,915
- Surface: Grass
- Field size: 105 x 68 m
- Public transit: Livadeia railway station

Construction
- Built: 1952

Tenant
- Levadiakos

Levadia Municipal Stadium "Lambros Katsonis" (Greek: Δημοτικό Στάδιο Λειβαδιάς "Λάμπρος Κατσώνης") is a multi-purpose stadium in Levadia, Greece. It was built in 1952, but had its latest redevelopment in 2005. It is currently used mostly for football matches and is the home stadium of the Levadiakos since their establishment in 1961. The stadium has a capacity of 5,915.

== History ==
The stadium was built in 1952. Since then, it has been used for the home matches of Levadiakos. In 2005 Levadiakos was promoted to the 1st National League (now Super League) and with his money he won from his upgrading refurbished the stadium that was then in a very bad condition. The platforms were upgraded and placed on all plastic seats, new journalism studios and suites were created, and projectors were added. In 2009, some upgrade projects were carried out and a small enclosure was built above the main platform and VIP locations. The capacity of the stadium is about 5,915 seats.
