= Dimitrios Mitoglou =

Greek footballer

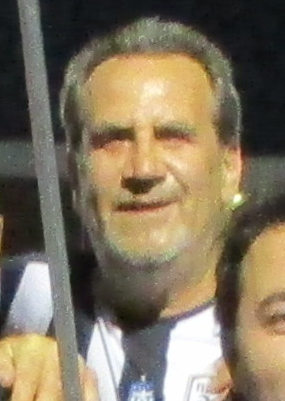
- Mitoglou in 2017

Personal information
- Full name: Dimitrios Mitoglou
- Date of birth: 11 January 1963 (age 63)
- Place of birth: Drama, Greece
- Height: 1.84 m (6 ft 0 in)
- Position: Defender

Senior career*
Years	Team	Apps	(Gls)
1983–1986	Doxa Drama	55	(10)
1986–1992	PAOK	100	(3)
1992–1994	Irodotos		
- * Club domestic league appearances and goals

Dimitrios Mitoglou (Greek: Δημήτριος Μήτογλου; born 11 January 1962) is a Greek retired football defender.

== Personal life ==
He is the father of the basketball player Konstantinos Mitoglou and the footballer Gerasimos Mitoglou.
