= Sakis Anastasiadis =

Greek footballer (born in 1961)

Personal information
- Full name: Athanasios Anastasiadis
- Date of birth: 1 July 1961 (age 65)
- Place of birth: Serres, Greece
- Position: Midfielder

Senior career*
Years	Team	Apps	(Gls)
1978–1985	Panserraikos		
1986–1993	Iraklis		
1993–1995	Panserraikos		
1995–1997	A.E. Nigritas		

International career
1984–1987	Greece	4	(0)

Managerial career
- 2004–2006: Iraklis (assistant)
- 2013–2014: Panserraikos
- 2014: AEL (assistant)
- 2014–2015: AEL
- 2015: AEL (assistant)
- 2016: AEL (youth)
- 2004–2006: Iraklis (youth)
- 2017: Panserraikos
- 2017–2018: Iraklis
- 2018: Panserraikos
- * Club domestic league appearances and goals

Sakis Anastasiadis (Greek: Σάκης Αναστασιάδης; born 1 July 1961) is a Greek professional football manager and former player.

== Personal life ==
He originated from Lefkonas, Serres.
