= Apostolos Tsourelas =

Greek footballer

Personal information
- Date of birth: 17 July 1963 (age 63)
- Place of birth: Doubia, Chalkidiki, Greece
- Height: 1.78 m (5 ft 10 in)
- Position: Defender

Senior career*
Years	Team	Apps	(Gls)
1979–1989	PAOK	128	(2)
1989–1991	Aris	37	(1)
1991–1992	Iraklis	9	(0)
Total		174	(3)
- * Club domestic league appearances and goals

Apostolos Tsourelas (Greek: Απόστολος Τσουρέλας; born 17 July 1963) is a retired Greek football defender.

== Honours ==
PAOK

- Alpha Ethniki: 1984–85
