= Dimosthenis Kavouras =

Greek footballer (born 1962)

Dimos Kavouras
Personal information
- Full name: Dimosthenis Kavouras
- Date of birth: 9 July 1962 (age 64)
- Place of birth: Nenita, Chios, Greece
- Position: Forward

Youth career
- –1981: Kanaris Neniton

Senior career*
Years	Team	Apps	(Gls)
1981–1983	Panchiakos		
1983–1987	Panathinaikos	24	(5)
1987–1989	Levadiakos	57	(24)
1989–1991	OFI	57	(14)
1991–1993	Apollon Smyrnis	35	(5)

International career
1988–1989	Greece	5	(0)

Managerial career
- 2014: Greece women U19
- 2015–2019: Greece women
- 2021: Agia Paraskevi WFC
- * Club domestic league appearances and goals

Dimosthenis "Dimos" Kavouras (Greek: Δημοσθένης Κάβουρας; born 9 July 1962 in Chios) is a retired Greek football striker and later manager.

== Honours ==
Super League Greece (2): 1983-84, 1985-86 Greek Cup (2): 1983-84, 1985-86
