= Sotiris Mavromatis =

Greek footballer

Personal information
- Full name: Sotirios Mavromatis
- Date of birth: 21 February 1966 (age 60)
- Place of birth: Alexandroupoli, Greece
- Height: 1.78 m (5 ft 10 in)
- Position: Midfielder

Senior career*
Years	Team	Apps	(Gls)
1984–1988	PAOK	69	(9)
1988–1995	Olympiacos	109	(10)
1995–1996	Paniliakos	26	(1)
1996–1998	Athinaikos	33	(7)
Total		237	(27)

International career
1987	Greece	1	(0)

Managerial career
- 2005–2006: Paniliakos
- 2006: Acharnaikos
- 2008: Panegialios
Medal record
Men's football
Representing Greece
UEFA European Under-21 Championship
Runner-up	1988
- * Club domestic league appearances and goals

Sotiris Mavromatis (Greek: Σωτήρης Μαυρομάτης; born 21 February 1966) is a Greek retired football midfielder and later manager. He was a squad member for the 1988 UEFA European Under-21 Championship and was capped once for Greece.

== Honours ==
PAOK

- Alpha Ethniki: 1984–85

Greece U21

- UEFA European Under-21 Championship runner-up: 1988

Olympiacos

- Greek Cup (2): 1989–90, 1991–92
