= Michalis Iordanidis =

Greek footballer (born in 1962)

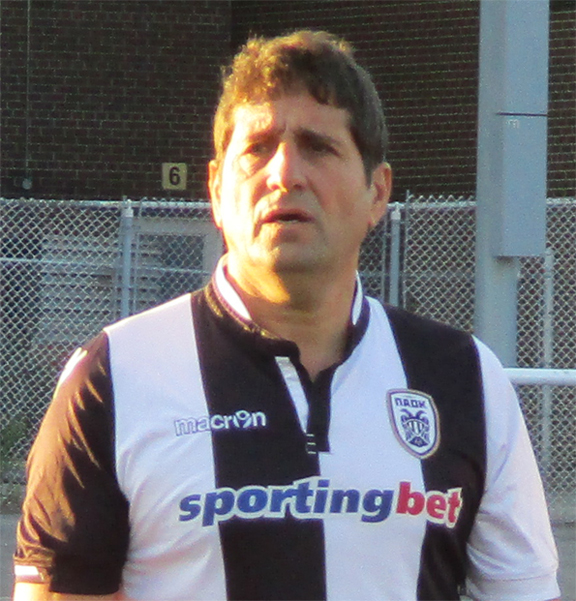
- Iordanidis in 2017

Personal information
- Date of birth: 1 January 1962 (age 64)
- Place of birth: Kavala, Greece
- Height: 1.90 m (6 ft 3 in)
- Position: Forward

Team information
- Current team: Greece U21 (assistant manager)

Senior career*
Years	Team	Apps	(Gls)
–1983	Kavala		
1983–1985	Makedonikos		
1985–1989	PAOK		
1989	Apollon Kalamarias		
1989–1995	Doxa Drama		
1995–1996	Ionikos		
1996–2000	Trikala		

Managerial career
- 1998: Trikala (caretaker)
- 2009–2010: Panathinaikos (assistant)
- 2014: Kavala
- 2014–: Greece U21 (assistant)
- 2014: → Greece U19 (caretaker)
- 2015: → Greece U21 (caretaker)
- * Club domestic league appearances and goals

Michalis Iordanidis (Greek: Μιχάλης Ιορδανίδης; born 1 January 1962) is a Greek former football player and manager who played as a forward.

== Honours ==
PAOK

- Alpha Ethniki: 1984–85
