= Nikos Karageorgiou =

Greek footballer & manager (born 1962)

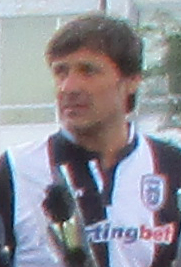
- Karageorgiou in 2017

Personal information
- Full name: Nikolaos Karageorgiou
- Date of birth: 8 December 1962 (age 63)
- Place of birth: Kavala, Greece
- Position: Defender

Youth career
- –1981: Aetos Eratino

Senior career*
Years	Team	Apps	(Gls)
1981–1986	Kavala	20	(0)
1986–1991	PAOK	125	(8)
1991–1993	Panathinaikos	42	(0)
1993–2000	Skoda Xanthi	179	(20)
Total		366	(28)

International career
1989–1992	Greece	16	(0)

Managerial career
- 2000: Skoda Xanthi
- 2001–2004: Skoda Xanthi
- 2005: PAOK
- 2006–2012: Ergotelis
- 2012–2013: Panetolikos
- 2013: Skoda Xanthi
- 2013–2014: Levadiakos
- 2014–2015: Enosis Neon Paralimni
- 2015–2016: AEL Kalloni
- 2019: Levadiakos
- 2020: Xanthi
- 2020–2021: Al-Shoulla
- 2024–2025: PAOK B
- * Club domestic league appearances and goals

Nikos Karageorgiou (Greek: Νίκος Καραγεωργίου; born 8 December 1962) is a Greek professional football manager and former player.

== Playing career ==
=== Club ===
Karageorgiou began his football career at his local village football club Aetos Eratino, before he was transferred to the region's prestigious club Kavala in 1981. He played for his hometown club for 5 years, and was subsequently transferred to PAOK in 1986, where he played for an additional 5 seasons. In 1991, Karageorgiou moved to Panathinaikos, where he won the Greek Cup in 1993, during his last season with the club. He then moved to Skoda Xanthi, where he spent the majority of his career staying at the club until 2000, when he decided to end his playing career and subsequently took over as manager of the club.

=== International ===
Karageorgiou also played 16 international matches with Greece from 1989 to 1992.

== Managerial career ==
Karageorgiou began his coaching career in Skoda Xanthi during the 1999−2000 season, when he took over as manager of the club replacing Vangelis Vlachos after Matchday 25, while he was still a regular player. During the 2001−02 season, after the resignation of Agentinian manager Juan Ramon Rocha, Karageorgiou, who was initially hired as general manager, was once again appointed head coach of the club, managing to lead Skoda Xanthi to their first ever European campaign, after finishing in 5th place. His tenure with Skoda Xanthi was eventually terminated in the summer of 2004, when he was replaced as head coach of the club by Giannis Matzourakis. In February 2005, he was appointed head coach of PAOK, but his contract was terminated a few months later, in September 2005.

In February 2006, Karageorgiou took over management of Beta Ethniki side Ergotelis, returning the club to its good form and winning the division title. During his tenure at Ergotelis, Karageorgiou enjoyed complete and unconditional support from the club's board of directors. He remained manager of Ergotelis for six straight seasons in the Greek Super League, thus becoming one of the longest serving managers in competition history, until the end of the 2011−12 season, when the club failed to avoid relegation.

In July 2012, Karageorgiou was appointed head coach of Panetolikos, but was replaced in mid-season. In April 2013 he took over management of Skoda Xanthi for the third time in his career, but was fired in September 2013. Karageorgiou was subsequently hired by fellow Super League side Levadiakos, but his contract was once again terminated prematurely, in February 2014.

In April 2014, Karageorgiou moved to Cyprus, taking over management of Enosis Neon Paralimni, and led the club to promotion to the Cypriot First Division, after winning the Second Division title. His contract with the club was terminated in November 2015. A month later, in December 2015 Karageorgiou was hired by Super League club AEL Kalloni. However, as the club was relegated at the end of the season, his contract was terminated on mutual consent.

== Managerial statistics ==
As of 1 February 2025

Team	From	To	Record				
Team	From	To	G	W	D	L	Win %
Skoda Xanthi	28 March 2000	28 May 2000	9	2	0	7	22.22
Skoda Xanthi	4 February 2001	30 June 2004	125	45	30	50	36.00
PAOK	17 February 2005	16 September 2005	15	6	5	4	40.00
Ergotelis	1 February 2006	30 April 2012	201	63	51	87	31.34
Panetolikos	3 July 2012	23 January 2013	17	5	6	6	29.41
Skoda Xanthi	27 April 2013	17 September 2013	8	2	1	5	25.00
Levadiakos	22 October 2013	11 February 2014	17	6	1	10	35.29
Enosis Neon Paralimni	16 November 2014	5 November 2015	29	19	5	5	65.52
AEL Kalloni	27 December 2015	22 April 2016	17	3	3	11	17.65
Levadiakos	22 January 2019	11 May 2019	14	3	3	8	21.43
Xanthi	7 March 2020	5 September 2020	9	1	3	5	11.11
Al-Shoulla	19 December 2020	31 December 2021	45	17	15	13	37.78
PAOK B	28 December 2024	20 October 2025	18	6	5	7	33.33
Career totals			524	178	128	218	33.97

== Honours ==
=== Player ===
Panathinaikos

- Greek Cup: 1993

=== Manager ===
Ergotelis

- Beta Ethniki: 2006

Enosis Neon Paralimni

- Cypriot Second Division: 2015
