= Lakis Papaioannou =

Greek footballer

Personal information
- Full name: Apostolos Papaioannou
- Date of birth: 5 October 1956 (age 70)
- Place of birth: Katerini, Greece
- Height: 1.72 m (5 ft 8 in)
- Position: Midfielder

Youth career
- ?–1970: A.O. Katerinis
- 1970–1973: Pierikos

Senior career*
Years	Team	Apps	(Gls)
1973–1979	Pierikos	92	(32)
1979–1986	Iraklis	179	(36)
1986–1988	PAOK	44	(5)
1988–1991	PAS Giannina		
1991–1992	APS Patrai		

International career
1977–1987	Greece	38	(2)
- * Club domestic league appearances and goals

Apostolos "Lakis" Papaioannou (Greek: Απόστολος "Λάκης" Παπαϊωάννου; born 5 October 1956) is a retired Greek professional footballer who played as a midfielder.

== Club career ==
Papaioannou began playing football with the youth sides of A.O. Katerinis and then Pierikos. In 1973, he made his senior debut for Pierikos in Beta Ethniki. Papaioannou helped Pierikos to gain its promotion to the Alpha Ethniki in 1975, and played for the club until 1979 when it was relegated to the regional leagues. Alpha Ethniki side Iraklis signed Papaioannou in 1979 and played for Iraklis until city rivals PAOK signed him in 1986.

Papaioannou helped PAOK to consecutive second-place finishes in the league, and then joined PAS Giannina in 1988. His finished his career with APS Patrai in 1992. In total Papaioannou made over 500 appearances in the Greek first and second divisions.

== International career ==
Papaioannou made 38 appearances and scored two goals for Greece from 1977 to 1987. He made his debut as a second-half substitute in a 6–1 friendly defeat to Romania on 21 September 1977.

== Post-retirement ==
After Papaioannou retired from playing, he became a football scout. He led the scouting and recruiting efforts for Arsenal F.C.'s new elite football academy in Loutraki.

== Personal life ==
Lakis Papaioannou is married to Konstantina Tarantzopoulou or otherwise Dina Papaioannou, a performer in northern Greece. His daughter, Eleana, is a pop singer.
