= 1985 Greek Football Cup final =

1985 Greek Cup final
- Event: 1984–85 Greek Football Cup
AEL	PAOK
4	1
- Date: 22 June 1985
- Venue: Olympic Stadium, Marousi, Athens
- Referee: Makis Germanakos (Athens)
- Attendance: 24,994

The 1985 Greek Cup final was the 41st final of the Greek Cup. The match took place on 22 June 1985 at the Olympic Stadium. The contesting teams were AEL and PAOK. It was AEL's third Greek Cup final and second consecutive in their 21 years of existence and PAOK's thirteenth Greek Cup final in their 59-year history.

== Venue ==
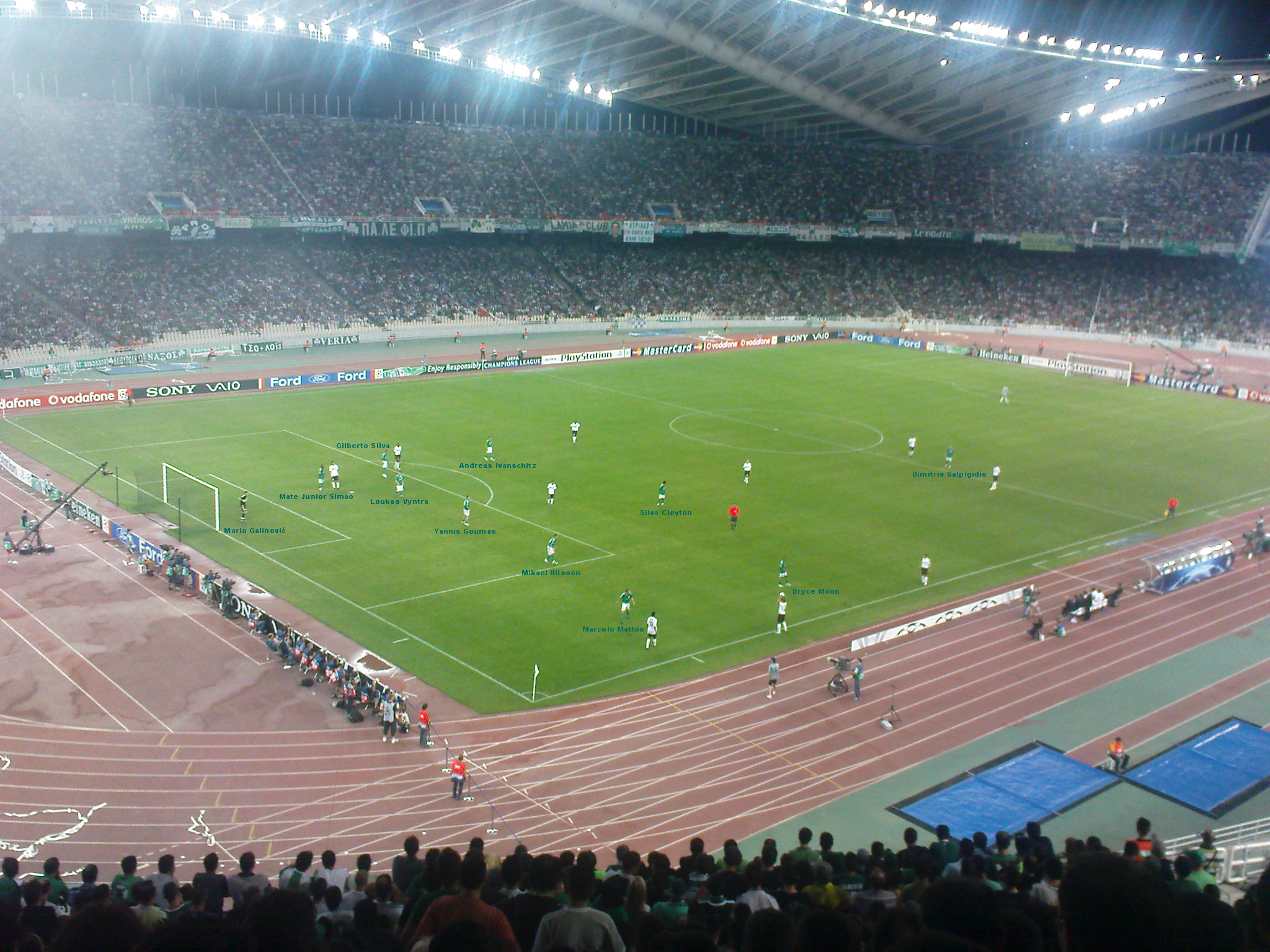
Athens Olympic Stadium.

This was the third Greek Cup final held at the Athens Olympic Stadium, after the 1983 and 1984 finals.

The Athens Olympic Stadium was built in 1982. The stadium is used as a venue for Panathinaikos, Olympiacos and Greece. Its current capacity is 80,000 and hosted a European Cup final in 1983.

== Background ==
AEL had reached the Greek Cup final two times. The last time that had played in a final was in 1984, where they had lost to Panathinaikos by 2–0.

PAOK had reached the Greek Cup final twelve times, winning two of them. The last time that they had won the Cup was in 1974 (4–3 on penalties, which came after a 2–2 draw at the end of the extra time against Olympiacos). The last time that had played in a final was in 1983, where they had lost to AEK Athens by 2–0.

The two teams had never met each other in a Cup final.

== Route to the final ==
AEL				Round	PAOK			
Opponent	Agg.	1st leg	2nd leg		Opponent	Agg.	1st leg	2nd leg
Panegialios	8–0 (H)			First round	Iraklis	3–1 (H)		
Apollon Kalamarias	1–0 (H)			Additional round	Bye			
Neapoli Piraeus	8–1	7–0 (H)	1–1 (A)	Round of 32	Aris	3–3 (a)	2–0 (H)	1–3 (A)
Makedonikos	6–3	2–0 (A)	4–3 (H)	Round of 16	Lamia	15–1	6–0 (H)	9–1 (A)
Korinthos	7–3	6–1 (H)	1–2 (A)	Quarter-finals	Olympiacos Volos	6–1	4–1 (A)	2–0 (H)
Levadiakos	7–0	2–0 (A)	5–0 (H)	Semi-finals	Panathinaikos	4–2	0–2 (A)	4–0 (H)

== Match ==
=== Details ===
22 June 1985
21:00 EEST

AEL	4–1	PAOK
Ziogas 39', 73'; Kmiecik 47'; Valaoras 75'	Report	Skartados 55'

Olympic Stadium, Marousi
Attendance: 24,994
Referee: Makis Germanakos (Athens)

AEL	PAOK

GK	1	(Greece) Georgios Plitsis
DF	2	(Greece) Takis Parafestas (c)
DF	5	(Greece) Giannis Galitsios
DF	4	(Greece) Georgios Mitsibonas
DF	3	(Greece) Kostas Kolomitrousis
MF	6	(Greece) Theodoros Voutiritsas
MF	8	(Greece) Christos Andreoudis	(substituted off) 87'
MF	9	(Poland) Krzysztof Adamczyk
FW	7	(Greece) Michalis Ziogas
FW	10	(Poland) Kazimierz Kmiecik
FW	11	(Greece) Giannis Valaoras
Substitutes:
GK	15	(Greece) Christos Michail
DF	13	(Greece) Babis Dossas
MF	12	(Greece) Sakis Tsiolis	(substituted on) 87'
MF	14	(Greece) Giannis Alexoulis
MF	16	(Greece) Lazaros Kyrilidis
Manager:
(Poland) Andrzej Strejlau

GK	1	(Greece) Lakis Stergioudas
DF	2	(Greece) Apostolos Tsourelas
DF	5	(Greece) Charis Baniotis		(substituted off) 21'
DF	4	(Socialist Federal Republic of Yugoslavia) Ivan Jurišić
DF	3	(Greece) Nikos Alavantas (c)
MF	6	(Greece) Georgios Skartados
MF	7	(Greece) Kyriakos Alexandridis
MF	8	(Greece) Vasilios Vasilakos	(red card) 20'
MF	9	(Greece) Thomas Singas
FW	10	(Socialist Federal Republic of Yugoslavia) Rade Paprica
FW	11	(Greece) Georgios Kostikos		(substituted off) 63'
Substitutes:
GK	15	(Greece) Takis Pantelis
DF	12	(Greece) Konstantinos Iosifidis
DF	13	(Greece) Konstantinos Malioufas
MF	14	(Greece) Ioannis Damanakis		(substituted on) 63'
FW	16	(Greece) Aris Karasavvidis		(substituted on) 21'
Manager:
(Austria) Walter Skocik

Assistant referees:
Giannis Triantafyllou (Dodecanese)
Kostas Adamopoulos (Athens)

Match rules

- 90 minutes
- 30 minutes of extra time if necessary
- Penalty shootout if scores still level
- Five named substitutes
- Maximum of two substitutions

== See also ==
- 1984–85 Greek Football Cup
