= 1984–85 PAOK FC season =

PAOK
1984–85 season
- President: Petros Kalafatis
- Manager: Walter Skocik
- Stadium: Toumba Stadium
- Alpha Ethniki: Winners
- Greek Cup: Runners-up
- Top goalscorer: League: Christos Dimopoulos (12); All: Christos Dimopoulos (17)
- Highest home attendance: 41,073 vs Olympiacos
- Lowest home attendance: 8,043 vs Pierikos (neutral)
- Average home league attendance: 22,584
Home colours

The 1984–85 season was PAOK Football Club's 59th in club's history and 26th consecutive in the top flight of Greek football. The team entered the Greek Football Cup in first round.

== Players ==
=== Squad ===
Note: Flags indicate national team as defined under FIFA eligibility rules; some limited exceptions apply. Players may hold more than one non-FIFA nationality.

No.	Pos.	Nation	Player
—	GK	GRE	Takis Pantelis
—	GK	GRE	Lakis Stergioudas
—	GK	GRE	Apostolos Terzis
—	DF	YUG	Ivan Jurišić
—	DF	GRE	Nikos Alavantas
—	DF	GRE	Apostolos Tsourelas
—	DF	GRE	Charis Baniotis
—	DF	GRE	Kostas Iosifidis (captain)
—	DF	GRE	Kostas Malioufas
—	DF	GRE	Giannis Psarras
—	DF	GRE	Stathis Apostolou
—	MF	GRE	Georgios Skartados
—	MF	GRE	Vasilios Vasilakos

No.	Pos.	Nation	Player
—	MF	GRE	Thomas Singas
—	MF	GRE	Ioannis Damanakis
—	MF	GRE	Kyriakos Alexandridis
—	MF	GRE	Sotiris Mavromatis
—	MF	GRE	Nikos Liakos
—	MF	GRE	Babis Spanosotiropoulos
—	MF	GRE	Stergios Mavrodimos
—	FW	YUG	Rade Paprica
—	FW	GRE	Christos Dimopoulos
—	FW	GRE	Giorgos Kostikos
—	FW	GRE	Aris Karasavvidis
—	FW	GRE	Michalis Iordanidis

== Transfers ==
Players transferred in

Transfer Window	Pos.	Name	Club	Fee
Summer	DF	(Socialist Federal Republic of Yugoslavia) Ivan Jurišić	(Socialist Federal Republic of Yugoslavia) Red Star	15.3 million Dr.
Summer	MF	(Greece) Stergios Mavrodimos	(Greece) AO Ampeloniakos	530.000 Dr.
Summer	FW	(Socialist Federal Republic of Yugoslavia) Rade Paprica	(Socialist Federal Republic of Yugoslavia) Željezničar	19 million Dr.
Summer	FW	(Greece) Aris Karasavvidis	(Greece) Aetos Skydra	2.5 million Dr.
Winter	GK	(Greece) Lakis Stergioudas	(Greece) AEK Athens	Free
Winter	MF	(Greece) Nikos Liakos	(Greece) PAS Giannina	8.5 million Dr.
Winter	MF	(Greece) Babis Spanosotiropoulos	(Greece) Panachaiki	?
Winter	FW	(Greece) Michalis Iordanidis	(Greece) Makedonikos	?

Players transferred out

Transfer Window	Pos.	Name	Club	Fee
Summer	DF	(Greece) Filotas Pellios	(Greece) Olympiakos Kymina	Free
Summer	MF	(Greece) Vasilis Georgopoulos	(Greece) Panionios	Free
Summer	GK	(Socialist Federal Republic of Yugoslavia) Mladen Furtula		Retired
Summer	DF	(Greece) Theodoros Apostolidis		Retired
Summer	MF	(Germany) Holger Trimhold		Retired
Summer	MF	(Greece) Giorgos Koudas		Retired

== Pre-season ==
Win Draw Loss

21 July 1984 Friendly	Leondig	0–2	PAOK	Austria
			Giantsis 60'; Malioufas 75'

24 July 1984 Friendly	Andor	0–8	PAOK	Austria

27 July 1984 Friendly	Sparkasse	1–2	PAOK	Austria
	30'		Vasilakos 40'; Kostikos 80'

28 July 1984 Friendly	Union	1–4	PAOK	Austria
			Paprica; Karasavvidis; Skartados

31 July 1984 Friendly	Linz	0–1	PAOK	Austria
			Skartados 65'

3 August 1984 Friendly	Austria Salzburg	1–1	PAOK	Austria
	82'		Paprica 70'

5 August 1984 Friendly	Stockerau	1–4	PAOK	Austria
			Skartados; Paprica; Karasavvidis

10 August 1984 Friendly	PAOK	1–0	Aris	Thessaloniki
	Paprica 32'			Stadium: Toumba Stadium

17 August 1984 Friendly	Iraklis	1–2	PAOK	Thessaloniki
	Grétarsson 81'		Damanakis 18'; Psarras 65'	Stadium: Kaftanzoglio Stadium

19 August 1984 Friendly	Xanthi	0–0	PAOK	Xanthi
				Stadium: Xanthi Ground

22 August 1984 Friendly	Larissa	1–1	PAOK	Larissa
	Mitsibonas 71'		Kostikos 14'	Stadium: Alcazar Stadium

27 August 1984 Friendly	PAOK	0–3	Olympiacos	Thessaloniki
			Welzl 5', 41', 50'	Stadium: Toumba Stadium

2 September 1984 Friendly	PAOK	1–0	Apollon Kalamaria	Thessaloniki
	Karasavvidis 72'			Stadium: Kaftanzoglio Stadium

5 September 1984 Friendly	Doxa Drama	3–3	PAOK	Drama
	Mesimerlis 11'; Strantzalis 55'; Flegas 57'		Vasilakos 9'; Karasavvidis 63'; Paprica 85'

10 September 1984 Friendly	PAOK	2–0	Pierikos	Thessaloniki
	Paprica 20'; Kostikos 29' (pen.)			Stadium: Toumba Stadium

12 September 1984 Friendly	Makedonikos	2–4	PAOK	Thessaloniki
	Tsalikis 5'; Farmakis 62'		Karasavvidis 11', 75'; Dimopoulos 26' (pen.); Giantsis 54'	Stadium: Makedonikos Stadium

16 September 1984 Friendly	PAO Koryfi	0–9	PAOK	Imathia
			Kostikos 20', 34' (pen.); Apostolou 50'; Alexandridis 55', 65'; Malioufas 78', 81'; Mavromatis 88'; Skartados 90'

19 September 1984 Friendly	Alexandreia	2–2	PAOK	Imathia
	Dalabyras 3', 10'		Malioufas 2'; Karasavvidis 26'

== Competitions ==
=== Overview ===
Competition	Record							
Competition	Pld	W	D	L	GF	GA	GD	Win %
Alpha Ethniki	30	19	8	3	54	26	+28	63.33
Greek Cup	10	7	0	3	32	12	+20	70.00
Total	40	26	8	6	86	38	+48	65.00

Source: Competitions

== Alpha Ethniki ==
=== Standings ===
Pos	Team	Pld	W	D	L	GF	GA	GD	Pts	Qualification or relegation
1	PAOK (C)	30	19	8	3	54	26	+28	46	Qualification for European Cup first round
2	Panathinaikos	30	17	9	4	61	30	+31	43	Qualification for UEFA Cup first round
3	AEK Athens	30	16	11	3	58	29	+29	43	Qualification for UEFA Cup first round
4	Olympiacos	30	17	8	5	53	23	+30	42	
5	Iraklis	30	19	3	8	59	33	+26	41	

Source: RSSSF
Rules for classification: 1st points; 2nd head-to-head points; 3rd head-to-head goal difference; 4th decision match.
(C) Champions

==== Results summary ====
Overall								Home						Away					
Pld	W	D	L	GF	GA	GD	Pts	W	D	L	GF	GA	GD	W	D	L	GF	GA	GD
30	19	8	3	54	26	+28	65	11	4	0	31	9	+22	8	4	3	23	17	+6

Last updated: 16 June 1985.
Source: Competitive matches

==== Results by round ====
Round	1	2	3	4	5	6	7	8	9	10	11	12	13	14	15	16	17	18	19	20	21	22	23	24	25	26	27	28	29	30
Ground	A	H	A	H	A	A	H	A	H	A	H	H	A	H	A	H	A	H	A	H	H	A	H	A	H	A	A	H	A	H
Result	W	W	W	W	D	W	W	W	D	W	W	W	L	W	W	D	L	W	L	D	W	W	W	W	W	D	D	W	D	D
Position	4	3	2	1	1	1	1	1	1	1	1	1	1	1	1	1	1	1	1	2	1	1	1	1	1	1	1	1	1	1

Source: League matches
A = Away; H = Home; W = Win; D = Draw; L = Loss

==== Matches ====
Win Draw Loss

23 September 1984 1	Apollon Athens	1–3	PAOK	Athens
17:00 EET	Majstorović 59'		Damanakis 18', 31'; Skartados 19'	Stadium: Nikos Goumas Stadium; Attendance: 5.384; Referee: Karathanasis

30 September 1984 2	PAOK	2–0	Aris	Thessaloniki
16:00 EET	Skartados 68'; Paprica 90'			Stadium: Toumba Stadium; Attendance: 30.890; Referee: Triantafyllou

7 October 1984 3	Ethnikos Piraeus	1–2	PAOK	Athens
15:30 EET	Batsinilas 62'		Dimopoulos 23'; Alexandridis 89'	Stadium: Peristeri Stadium; Attendance: 6.790; Referee: Voutsaras

21 October 1984 4	PAOK	1–0	Olympiacos	Thessaloniki
15:30 EET	Kostikos 87' (pen.)			Stadium: Toumba Stadium; Attendance: 41.073; Referee: Megas

4 November 1984 5	AEK Athens	2–2	PAOK	Athens
15:00 EET	Tsourelas 30' (o.g.); Mavros 70'		Skartados 22'; Singas 90'	Stadium: Nikos Goumas Stadium; Attendance: 23.356; Referee: Kantartzis

11 November 1984 6	Apollon Kalamarias	0–2	PAOK	Thessaloniki
15:00 EET	Siapanidis (red card) 66'		Singas (red card) 66'; Skartados 70'; Karasavvidis 76'	Stadium: Kleanthis Vikelidis Stadium; Attendance: 14.093; Referee: Lappas

18 November 1984 7	PAOK	4–1	AEL	Thessaloniki
15:00 EET	Paprica 5'; Alexandridis 47'; Kostikos 66', 84'		Patsiavouras (red card) 26'; Adamczyk 56'	Stadium: Toumba Stadium; Attendance: 25.372; Referee: Kaklamanos

25 November 1984 8	Egaleo	1–2	PAOK	Athens
15:00 EET	Papatheodorou 75'		Simeoforidis 14' (o.g.); Baniotis 83'	Stadium: Stavros Mavrothalassitis Stadium; Attendance: 7.688; Referee: Voutsaras

2 December 1984 9	PAOK	1–1	Iraklis	Thessaloniki
14:45 EET	Dimopoulos 35'		Karaiskos 19'	Stadium: Toumba Stadium; Attendance: 32.285; Referee: Dimitriadis

9 December 1984 10	Panachaiki	0–3	PAOK	Patras
14:45 EET			Kostikos 69', 77' (pen.), 84' (pen.)	Stadium: Kostas Davourlis Stadium; Attendance: 12.020; Referee: Kolokythas

23 December 1984 11	PAOK	2–1	Pierikos	Kavala
14:45 EET	Kostikos 33' (pen.); Singas 39'		Komjáti 29'	Stadium: Kavala Stadium; Attendance: 8.023; Referee: Tsirikidis
Note: Game held at Kavala because PAOK had a stadium ban.

30 December 1984 12	PAOK	2–0	Doxa Drama	Thessaloniki
14:45 EET	Paprica 29'; Karasavvidis 48'			Stadium: Toumba Stadium; Attendance: 9.418; Referee: Batras

6 January 1985 13	OFI	3–1	PAOK	Heraklion
14:45 EET	Tsirimokos 24', 78' (pen.); Vlastos 32'		Dimopoulos 76'	Stadium: Theodoros Vardinogiannis Stadium; Attendance: 8.502; Referee: Kontogiannidis

13 January 1985 14	PAOK	1–0	Panionios	Thessaloniki
14:45 EET	Dimopoulos 78'			Stadium: Toumba Stadium; Attendance: 15.345; Referee: Matsoukas

20 January 1985 15	Panathinaikos	0–1	PAOK	Athens
14:45 EET			Paprica 80'	Stadium: Olympic Stadium; Attendance: 74.043; Referee: Kantartzis

27 January 1985 16	PAOK	0–0	Apollon Athens	Thessaloniki
14:45 EET				Stadium: Toumba Stadium; Attendance: 17.251; Referee: Iatropoulos

3 February 1985 17	Aris	3–0	PAOK	Thessaloniki
14:45 EET	Bibisidis 6'; Zelelidis 59', 90+5'; Michalitsos (red card) 70'		Iosifidis (red card) 70'; Alavantas (red card) 74'	Stadium: Kleanthis Vikelidis Stadium; Attendance: 20.280; Referee: Koutris

10 February 1985 18	PAOK	5–2	Ethnikos Piraeus	Thessaloniki
15:30 EET	Paprica 24'; Skartados 34', 66', 75' (pen.); Liakos 70'		Liolios 46'; Batsinilas 84' (pen.)	Stadium: Toumba Stadium; Attendance: 16.495; Referee: Batras

17 February 1985 19	Olympiacos	2–1	PAOK	Athens
15:30 EET	Mitropoulos 47'; Sarganis 80' (pen.)		Paprica 89'	Stadium: Olympic Stadium; Attendance: 57.581; Referee: Vasilakis

10 March 1985 20	PAOK	1–1	AEK Athens	Thessaloniki
16:00 EET	Dimopoulos 61'		Esterházy 29'	Stadium: Toumba Stadium; Attendance: 40.506; Referee: Tsirikidis

17 March 1985 21	PAOK	3–1	Apollon Kalamarias	Thessaloniki
16:00 EET	Vasilakos 25'; Dimopoulos 62'; Skartados 77'		Skočajić 65' (pen.) (red card) 70'	Stadium: Toumba Stadium; Attendance: 13.815; Referee: Ntontos

31 March 1985 22	AEL	1–2	PAOK	Larissa
17:00 EET	Parafestas 86' (pen.)		Dimopoulos 26', 83'	Stadium: Alcazar Stadium; Attendance: 16.890; Referee: Triantafyllou

7 April 1985 23	PAOK	3–1	Egaleo	Thessaloniki
17:00 EET	Dimopoulos 32', 57'; Karasavvidis 45'		Pigaditis 42' (pen.)	Stadium: Toumba Stadium; Attendance: 16.768; Referee: Germanakos

21 April 1985 24	Iraklis	0–1	PAOK	Trikala
17:00 EET			Skartados 1'	Stadium: Trikala Municipal Stadium; Attendance: 17.010; Referee: Koukoulakis
Note: Game held at Trikala because Iraklis had a stadium ban.

28 April 1985 25	PAOK	2–0	Panachaiki	Thessaloniki
17:00 EET	Karasavvidis 45'; Skartados 85'			Stadium: Toumba Stadium; Attendance: 19.344; Referee: Vassaras

5 May 1985 26	Pierikos	1–1	PAOK	Katerini
17:30 EET	Michalitsios 84'		Dimopoulos 45'	Stadium: Katerini Stadium; Attendance: 7.460; Referee: Tsirikidis

12 May 1985 27	Doxa Drama	2–2	PAOK	Drama
17:30 EET	Panidis 14'; Yfantidis 64'		Dimopoulos 71'; Alavantas 85'	Stadium: Doxa Drama Stadium; Attendance: 9.410; Referee: Zakestidis

26 May 1985 28	PAOK	3–0	OFI	Thessaloniki
17:30 EET	Kostikos 24'; Singas 34'; Baniotis 49'			Stadium: Toumba Stadium; Attendance: 16.263; Referee: Naoum

9 June 1985 29	Panionios	0–0	PAOK	Athens
17:30 EET				Stadium: Nea Smyrni Stadium; Attendance: 9.180; Referee: Georgiadis

16 June 1985 30	PAOK	1–1	Panathinaikos	Thessaloniki
17:30 EET	Skartados 81'		Saravakos 78'	Stadium: Toumba Stadium; Attendance: 35.914; Referee: Koukoulakis

== Greek Cup ==
=== First round ===
31 October 1984	PAOK	3–1	Iraklis	Thessaloniki
14:30 EET	Damanakis 26', 47'; Alavantas 79'		Xanthopoulos 45'	Stadium: Toumba Stadium; Attendance: 17,757; Referee: Zakestidis (Macedonia)

=== Second round ===
26 December 1984 1st leg	PAOK	2–0	Aris	Thessaloniki
14:45 EET	Karasavvidis 24'; Dimopoulos (penalty missed) 28'; Alexandridis 63'			Stadium: Toumba Stadium; Attendance: 23,827; Referee: Dimitriadis (Piraeus)

16 January 1985 2nd leg	Aris	3–1 (3–3 (a) agg.)	PAOK	Thessaloniki
14:30 EET	Zelelidis 65'; Eriksson 85'; Kouis 90+2'		Vasilakos 89'	Stadium: Kleanthis Vikelidis Stadium; Attendance: 14,639; Referee: Michailidis (Piraeus)

=== Third round ===
6 February 1985 1st leg	PAOK	6–0	Lamia	Thessaloniki
15:30 EET	Damanakis 13'; Paprica 19' (pen.), 65' (penalty missed) 52'; Dimopoulos 41', 87'; Iordanidis 75'			Stadium: Toumba Stadium; Attendance: 5,218; Referee: Voutsaras (Athens)

20 February 1985 2nd leg	Lamia	1–9 (1–15 agg.)	PAOK	Lamia
15:00 EET	Kalenteroglou (red card) 32'; Lendas 38' (pen.); Sylevistas (penalty missed) 41'		Vasilakos 7', 50', 75'; Iordanidis 15', 54'; Mavromatis 36', 52'; Paprica 70'; Iosifidis 86'	Stadium: Lamia Municipal Stadium; Attendance: 3,424; Referee: Kolokythas (Athens)

=== Quarter-finals ===
3 April 1985 1st leg	Olympiacos Volos	1–4	PAOK	Volos
17:00 EET	Douzenis 32' (pen.)		Jurišić 19'; Dimopoulos 61', 68', 73'	Stadium: Volos Municipal Stadium; Attendance: 4,809; Referee: Kaklamanos (Arcadia)

8 May 1985 2nd leg	PAOK	2–0 (6–1 agg.)	Olympiacos Volos	Thessaloniki
17:00 EET	Kostikos 36'; Damanakis 38'			Stadium: Toumba Stadium; Attendance: 2,615; Referee: Dimitriadis (Piraeus)

=== Semi-finals ===
22 May 1985 1st leg	Panathinaikos	2–0	PAOK	Athens
21:00 EET	Antoniou 16'; Rocha 49'			Stadium: Olympic Stadium; Attendance: 48,104; Referee: Triantafyllou (Dodecanese)

5 June 1985 2nd leg	PAOK	4–0 (4–2 agg.)	Panathinaikos	Thessaloniki
20:30 EET	Singas 39'; Kostikos 44'; Alexandridis 63'; Karasavvidis 80'			Stadium: Toumba Stadium; Attendance: 40,561; Referee: Georgiadis (Drama)

=== Final ===
22 June 1985	AEL	4–1	PAOK	Athens
21:00 EEST	Ziogas 39', 73'; Kmiecik 47'; Valaoras 75'		Vasilakos (red card) 20'; Skartados 55'	Stadium: Olympic Stadium; Attendance: 24,994; Referee: Makis Germanakos (Athens)

== Statistics ==
=== Squad statistics ===
As of June 22, 1985

Appearances denote players in the starting lineup, with the numbers in parentheses denoting appearances as substitute.

No.	Name	Alpha Ethniki		Greek Cup		Total	
No.	Name	Apps	Goals	Apps	Goals	Apps	Goals
Goalkeepers
	(Greece) Takis Pantelis	24	0	4	0	28	0
	(Greece) Lakis Stergioudas	8	0	3	0	11	0
	(Greece) Apostolos Terzis	0	0	3	0	3	0
Defenders
	(Socialist Federal Republic of Yugoslavia) Ivan Jurišić	28	0	9	1	37	1
	(Greece) Nikos Alavantas	27	1	6	1	33	2
	(Greece) Apostolos Tsourelas	24	0	7	0	31	0
	(Greece) Charis Baniotis	24	2	4	0	28	2
	(Greece) Kostas Iosifidis	17	0	3	1	20	1
	(Greece) Kostas Malioufas	4	0	4	0	8	0
	(Greece) Giannis Psarras	2	0	0	0	2	0
	(Greece) Stathis Apostolou	0	0	1	0	1	0
Midfielders
	(Greece) Georgios Skartados	29	11	5	1	34	12
	(Greece) Vasilios Vasilakos	25	1	8	4	33	5
	(Greece) Thomas Singas	24	3	9	1	33	4
	(Greece) Ioannis Damanakis	19	2	5	4	24	6
	(Greece) Kyriakos Alexandridis	18	2	6	2	24	4
	(Greece) Sotiris Mavromatis	6	0	5	2	11	2
	(Greece) Nikos Liakos	6	1	5	0	11	1
	(Greece) Babis Spanosotiropoulos	4	0	5	0	9	0
	(Greece) Stergios Mavrodimos	0	0	1	0	1	0
Forwards
	(Socialist Federal Republic of Yugoslavia) Rade Paprica	30	6	10	3	40	9
	(Greece) Christos Dimopoulos	28	12	8	5	36	17
	(Greece) Giorgos Kostikos	18	8	5	2	23	10
	(Greece) Aris Karasavvidis	17	4	6	2	23	6
	(Greece) Michalis Iordanidis	7	0	4	3	11	3

Source: Match reports in RSSSF

=== Goalscorers ===
Rank	No.	Pos.	Player	Alpha Ethniki	Greek Cup	Total
1		FW	(Greece) Christos Dimopoulos	12	5	17
2		MF	(Greece) Georgios Skartados	11	1	12
3		FW	(Greece) Georgios Kostikos	8	2	10
4		FW	(Socialist Federal Republic of Yugoslavia) Rade Paprica	6	3	9
5		FW	(Greece) Aris Karasavvidis	4	2	6
5		MF	(Greece) Ioannis Damanakis	2	4	6
7		MF	(Greece) Vasilios Vasilakos	1	4	5
8		ΜF	(Greece) Thomas Singas	3	1	4
8		MF	(Greece) Kyriakos Alexandridis	2	2	4
10		FW	(Greece) Michalis Iordanidis	0	3	3
11		DF	(Greece) Charis Baniotis	2	0	2
11		DF	(Greece) Nikos Alavantas	1	1	2
11		MF	(Greece) Sotiris Mavromatis	0	2	2
14		MF	(Greece) Nikos Liakos	1	0	1
14		DF	(Greece) Kostas Iosifidis	0	1	1
14		DF	(Socialist Federal Republic of Yugoslavia) Ivan Jurišić	0	1	1
Own goals				1	0	1
TOTALS				54	32	86

Source: Match reports in RSSSF
