= 1985–86 PAOK FC season =

PAOK
1985–86 season
- President: Charis Savvidis
- Manager: Walter Skocik; Michalis Bellis
- Stadium: Toumba Stadium
- Alpha Ethniki: 10th
- Greek Cup: Additional round
- European Cup: 1st round
- Top goalscorer: League: Skartados (11); All: Skartados (12)
- Highest home attendance: 40,000 vs Hellas Verona

The 1985–86 season was PAOK Football Club's 59th in existence and the club's 27th consecutive season in the top flight of Greek football. The team entered the Greek Football Cup in first round and also participated in the European Cup.

== Players ==
=== Squad ===
Note: Flags indicate national team as defined under FIFA eligibility rules; some limited exceptions apply. Players may hold more than one non-FIFA nationality.

No.	Pos.	Nation	Player
—	GK	GRE	Apostolos Terzis
—	GK	GRE	Lakis Stergioudas
—	GK	GRE	Giannis Gitsioudis
—	GK	GRE	Takis Pantelis
—	DF	YUG	Ivan Jurišić
—	DF	GRE	Nikos Alavantas (captain)
—	DF	GRE	Apostolos Tsourelas
—	DF	GRE	Charis Baniotis
—	DF	GRE	Kostas Malioufas
—	DF	GRE	Giannis Psarras
—	DF	GRE	Pantelis Sachanidis
—	MF	GRE	Georgios Skartados

No.	Pos.	Nation	Player
—	MF	GRE	Vasilios Vasilakos
—	MF	GRE	Thomas Singas
—	MF	GRE	Dimitris Pittas
—	MF	GRE	Kyriakos Alexandridis
—	MF	GRE	Sotiris Mavromatis
—	MF	GRE	Nikos Liakos
—	FW	YUG	Rade Paprica
—	FW	GRE	Kostas Orfanos
—	FW	GRE	Georgios Kostikos
—	FW	GRE	Aris Karasavvidis
—	FW	GRE	Michalis Iordanidis
—	FW	GRE	Stefanos Borbokis

== Transfers ==
Players transferred in

Transfer Window	Pos.	Name	Club	Fee
Summer	GK	(Greece) Giannis Gitsioudis	(Greece) Iraklis	Free
Summer	MF	(Greece) Dimitris Pittas	(Greece) Ethnikos	15 million Dr.
Summer	FW	(Greece) Kostas Orfanos	(Greece) Olympiacos	Free

Players transferred out

Transfer Window	Pos.	Name	Club	Fee
Summer	DF	(Greece) Kostas Iosifidis		Retired
Summer	MF	(Greece) Ioannis Damanakis	(Greece) Makedonikos	Free
Summer	FW	(Greece) Christos Dimopoulos	(Greece) Panathinaikos	Free

== Pre-season ==
Win Draw Loss

2 August 1985 Friendly	SU Vortuna Bad Leonfelden	3–12	PAOK	Austria
			Iordanidis; Liakos; Mavromatis; Orfanos; Malioufas; Karasavvidis

3 August 1985 Friendly	Grazer AK	5–3	PAOK	Austria
	30'; 38'; 48'; 53'; 55'		Paprica 23'; Karasavvidis 63', 67'
Note: Teams played with 9 players instead of 11 and without the offside rule.

5 August 1985 Friendly	Rapid Wien	3–4	PAOK	Austria
	1'; Krankl 30', 87'		Karasavvidis 34'; Orfanos 41'; Kostikos 48'; Skartados 64' (pen.)
Note: Teams played with 9 players instead of 11 and without the offside rule.

8 August 1985 Friendly	FC Kufstein	1–2	PAOK	Austria
	20'		Vasilakos 40'; Iordanidis 80'

10 August 1985 Friendly	SK Jenbach	0–7	PAOK	Austria
	20'		Skartados 10'; Vasilakos 21'; Orfanos 41'; Karasavvidis 42'; Iordanidis 55'; Paprica 56', 62'

11 August 1985 Friendly	SpG Wattens	0–3	PAOK	Austria
	20'		Orfanos 42'; Vasilakos 44'; Skartados 83'

18 August 1985 Friendly	AEL	1–0	PAOK	Larissa
	Ziogas 31'			Stadium: Alcazar Stadium

19 August 1985 Friendly	Iraklis	1–1	PAOK	Thessaloniki
	Hatzipanagis 89'		Orfanos 84'	Stadium: Kaftanzoglio Stadium

21 August 1985 Friendly	Kavala	4–1	PAOK	Kavala
	Karageorgiou 11' (pen.), 59'; Vrynios 27'; Strantzalis 56'		Iordanidis 21'	Stadium: Kavala Stadium; Referee: Kapetandreou

23 August 1985 Friendly	Aris	1–0	PAOK	Thessaloniki
	Anagnostou 23'			Stadium: Kaftanzoglio Stadium; Referee: Zakestidis

28 August 1985 Friendly	Panathinaikos	2–0	PAOK	Athens
	Mavridis 73'; Saravakos 82'			Stadium: Athens Olympic Stadium; Referee: Andreou

31 August 1985 Friendly	Makedonikos	1–1	PAOK	Thessaloniki
	Zarkos 23'		Iordanidis 20'	Stadium: Makedonikos Stadium

== Competitions ==
=== Overview ===
Competition	Record							
Competition	Pld	W	D	L	GF	GA	GD	Win %
Alpha Ethniki	30	10	7	13	33	38	−5	33.33
Greek Cup	2	0	2	0	1	1	+0	0.00
European Cup	2	0	0	2	2	5	−3	0.00
Total	34	10	9	15	36	44	−8	29.41

Source: Competitions

=== Managerial statistics ===
Head coach	From	To	Record							
Head coach	From	To	G	W	D	L	GF	GA	GD	Win %
(Austria) Walter Skocik	Start of season	02.03.1986	26	6	7	13	25	36	−11	23.08
(Greece) Michalis Bellis	09.03.1986	End of season	8	4	2	2	11	8	+3	50.00

== Alpha Ethniki ==
=== Standings ===
Pos	Team	Pld	W	D	L	GF	GA	GD	Pts
8	AEL	30	12	6	12	36	31	+5	30
9	Apollon Kalamarias	30	9	10	11	25	30	−5	28
10	PAOK	30	10	7	13	33	38	−5	27
11	Apollon Smyrnis	30	5	14	11	19	34	−15	24
12	Ethnikos Piraeus	30	6	12	12	27	39	−12	24

Source: RSSSF
Rules for classification: 1st points; 2nd head-to-head points; 3rd head-to-head goal difference; 4th decision match.

==== Results summary ====
Overall								Home						Away					
Pld	W	D	L	GF	GA	GD	Pts	W	D	L	GF	GA	GD	W	D	L	GF	GA	GD
30	10	7	13	33	38	−5	37	10	3	2	24	10	+14	0	4	11	9	28	−19

Last updated: 27 April 1986.
Source: Competitive matches

==== Results by round ====
Round	1	2	3	4	5	6	7	8	9	10	11	12	13	14	15	16	17	18	19	20	21	22	23	24	25	26	27	28	29	30
Ground	H	A	H	A	H	A	H	A	A	H	A	H	A	H	A	A	H	A	H	A	H	A	H	H	A	H	A	H	A	H
Result	L	L	W	D	W	L	L	L	L	W	L	W	L	D	D	L	W	L	W	D	D	L	W	W	L	W	D	D	L	W
Position	10	15	10	11	8	12	13	14	14	13	14	12	14	13	12	13	12	13	12	11	11	14	11	10	10	10	10	10	10	10

Source: League matches
A = Away; H = Home; W = Win; D = Draw; L = Loss

==== Matches ====
Win Draw Loss

7 September 1985 1	PAOK	1–2	Panionios	Thessaloniki
	Pittas 10'		Mavrikis 70'; Barzov 82'	Stadium: Kaftanzoglio Stadium; Attendance: 22,201
Note: Game held at Kaftanzoglio Stadium because Toumba Stadium was closed for football pitch maintenance.

14 September 1985 2	AEK Athens	1–0	PAOK	Athens
	Manolas 25'			Stadium: Athens Olympic Stadium; Attendance: 54,800; Referee: Adamopoulos

22 September 1985 3	PAOK	5–0	Apollon Athens	Thessaloniki
	Paprica 27'; Kostikos 46', 65'; Skartados 62', 88'			Stadium: Toumba Stadium; Attendance: 10,489

29 September 1985 4	Ethnikos Piraeus	0–0	PAOK	Piraeus
				Stadium: Karaiskakis Stadium; Attendance: 6,346; Referee: Koutris

6 October 1985 5	PAOK	1–0	Iraklis	Thessaloniki
	Mavromatis 83'			Stadium: Toumba Stadium; Attendance: 16,153

13 October 1985 6	Panserraikos	4–1	PAOK	Serres
	Jarůšek 30', 63'; Anastasiadis 46' (pen.); Dimitriou 54'		Skartados 45'	Stadium: Serres Municipal Stadium; Referee: Georgiadis

20 October 1985 7	PAOK	0–1	Panathinaikos	Thessaloniki
			Kavouras 81'	Stadium: Toumba Stadium; Attendance: 21,448

3 November 1985 8	Aris	3–1	PAOK	Thessaloniki
	Nikić 73'; Bahtić 82'; Bibisidis 85'		Singas 58'	Stadium: Kleanthis Vikelidis Stadium; Attendance: 16,444; Referee: Kapetanakis

10 November 1985 9	Panachaiki	2–1	PAOK	Patras
	Chardalias 57' (pen.); Vujadinović 59'		Karasavvidis 20'	Stadium: Kostas Davourlis Stadium; Attendance: 7,022; Referee: Ntontos

24 November 1985 10	PAOK	1–0	Doxa Drama	Thessaloniki
	Skartados 24' (pen.)			Stadium: Toumba Stadium; Attendance: 3,155; Referee: Germanakos

1 December 1985 11	Olympiacos	2–0	PAOK	Athens
	Anastopoulos 2', 81'			Stadium: Athens Olympic Stadium; Attendance: 37,604; Referee: Triantafyllou

8 December 1985 12	PAOK	4–1	Apollon Kalamarias	Thessaloniki
	Skartados 25'; Baniotis 31'; Vasilakos 62', 65'		Katrakylakis 47'	Stadium: Toumba Stadium; Attendance: 9,066

15 December 1985 13	OFI	2–0	PAOK	Heraklion
	Vlastos 23', 61'			Stadium: Theodoros Vardinogiannis Stadium; Attendance: 5,941

22 December 1985 14	PAOK	1–1	AEL	Thessaloniki
	Karasavvidis 35'		Galitsios 87'	Stadium: Toumba Stadium; Attendance: 11,798; Referee: Kalpakidis

5 January 1986 15	PAS Giannina	1–1	PAOK	Ioannina
	Manevski 40'		Kostikos 87'	Stadium: Zosimades Stadium; Referee: Andreou

12 January 1986 16	Panionios	2–1	PAOK	Athens
	Barzov 23' (pen.); Mavrikis 73'		Kostikos 36'	Stadium: Nea Smyrni Stadium; Referee: Kolokythas

26 January 1986 17	PAOK	2–1	AEK Athens	Thessaloniki
	Singas 18'; Vasilakos 59'		Mavros 43'	Stadium: Toumba Stadium; Attendance: 24,113; Referee: Matsoukas

2 February 1986 18	Apollon Athens	1–0	PAOK	Athens
	Kastanos 84'			Stadium: Rizoupoli Stadium

9 February 1986 19	PAOK	2–1	Ethnikos Piraeus	Katerini
	Kostikos 2'; Psarras 88'		Tsouxtos 83'	Stadium: Katerini Stadium
Note: Game held at Katerini because PAOK had a stadium ban.

16 February 1986 20	Iraklis	0–0	PAOK	Thessaloniki
				Stadium: Kaftanzoglio Stadium; Attendance: 6,209; Referee: Amygdalis

23 February 1986 21	PAOK	0–0	Panserraikos	Thessaloniki
			Thatharopoulos (red card) 76'	Stadium: Toumba Stadium; Attendance: 9,871; Referee: Zakestidis

2 March 1986 22	Panathinaikos	5–0	PAOK	Athens
	Charalambidis 25'; Mavridis 46'; Zajec 47'; Rocha 62'; Saravakos 90'			Stadium: Athens Olympic Stadium; Attendance: 46,961

9 March 1986 23	PAOK	1–0	Aris	Thessaloniki
	Skartados 18'			Stadium: Toumba Stadium; Attendance: 24,179; Referee: Brentas

16 March 1986 24	PAOK	2–1	Panachaiki	Thessaloniki
	Skartados 51', 87'		Chardalias 9'	Stadium: Toumba Stadium; Attendance: 6,266; Referee: Michailidis

23 March 1986 25	Doxa Drama	2–1	PAOK	Drama
	Pachatouridis 32'; Yfantidis 45'		Liakos 64'	Stadium: Doxa Drama Stadium; Referee: Dimitriadis

30 March 1986 26	PAOK	1–0	Olympiacos	Thessaloniki
	Orfanos 27'			Stadium: Toumba Stadium; Attendance: 24,970; Referee: Triantafyllou

6 April 1986 27	Apollon Kalamaria	1–1	PAOK	Thessaloniki
	Tsalkitzis 39'; Tsoleridis (red card) 55'		Skartados 68'	Stadium: Kalamaria Stadium; Attendance: 10,058; Referee: Chrysanis

13 April 1986 28	PAOK	0–0	OFI	Thessaloniki
				Stadium: Toumba Stadium; Attendance: 12,958; Referee: Dimitriadis

20 April 1986 29	AEL	2–1	PAOK	Larissa
	Agorogiannis 1'; Ziogas 32'		Skartados 37'	Stadium: Alcazar Stadium; Attendance: 4,120

27 April 1986 30	PAOK	4–2	PAS Giannina	Thessaloniki
	Skartados 21' (pen.), 29'; Mavromatis 42'; Iordanidis 66'		Mantzoukis 12'; Papadimitriou 84'	Stadium: Toumba Stadium; Attendance: 5,303

== Greek Cup ==
=== First round ===
9 October 1985	Anagennisi Giannitsa	1–1 (a.e.t.) (15–16 p)	PAOK	Krya Vrysi
	Penos 39'		Karasavvidis 70'	Stadium: Ioannis Tserkezidis Municipal Stadium
	Penalties
	Dimoglou (penalty scored); Savoglou (penalty scored); Tsibinis (penalty scored); Ronis (penalty scored); Kalaitzidis (penalty missed); Papourtzis (penalty scored); Dimitriadis (penalty scored); Skourias (penalty scored); Tsirogiannis (penalty scored); Gavranidis (penalty scored); Penos (penalty scored); Dimoglou (penalty scored); Savoglou (penalty scored); Tsibinis (penalty scored); Tsirogiannis (penalty scored); Skourias (penalty missed); Kalaitzidis (penalty scored); Dimitriadis (penalty missed)		(penalty missed) Vasilakos; (penalty scored) Kostikos; (penalty scored) Singas; (penalty scored) Baniotis; (penalty scored) Skartados; (penalty scored) Karasavvidis; (penalty scored) Pittas; (penalty scored) Orfanos; (penalty scored) Mavromatis; (penalty scored) Alavantas; (penalty scored) Terzis; (penalty scored) Skartados; (penalty scored) Kostikos; (penalty scored) Singas; (penalty scored) Pittas; (penalty missed) Alavantas; (penalty scored) Mavromatis; (penalty scored) Vasilakos

=== Additional round ===
20 November 1985	Olympiacos	0–0 (a.e.t.) (4–3 p)	PAOK	Athens
				Stadium: Athens Olympic Stadium; Attendance: 25,955; Referee: Markou
	Penalties
	Barrios (penalty scored); Togias (penalty missed); Kokolakis (penalty scored); Michos (penalty scored); Anastopoulos (penalty scored)		(penalty scored) Singas; (penalty scored) Paprica; (penalty scored) Karasavvidis; (penalty missed) Alavantas; (penalty missed) Skartados

== European Cup ==
=== First round ===
18 September 1985 1st leg	Hellas Verona (Italy)	3–1	(Greece) PAOK	Verona, Italy
	Elkjær 15', 85'; Volpati 87'	Report	(yellow card) 39', (goal) 70' Skartados; (yellow card) 86' Baniotis	Stadium: Stadio Marcantonio Bentegodi; Attendance: 40,000; Referee: Horst Brummeier (Austria)

2 October 1985 2nd leg	PAOK (Greece)	1–2 (2–5 agg.)	(Italy) Hellas Verona	Thessaloniki, Greece
	Vasilakos 4'; Pittas (yellow card) 45'; Alavantas (yellow card) 65'	Report	Elkjær 29', 73'	Stadium: Toumba Stadium; Attendance: 40,000; Referee: Augusto Lamo Castillo (Spain)

== Statistics ==
=== Squad statistics ===
As of April 27, 1986

Appearances denote players in the starting lineup, with the numbers in parentheses denoting appearances as substitute.

No.	Name	Alpha Ethniki		Greek Cup		European Cup		Total	
No.	Name	Apps	Goals	Apps	Goals	Apps	Goals	Apps	Goals
Goalkeepers
	(Greece) Apostolos Terzis	15	0	2	0	0	0	17	0
	(Greece) Lakis Stergioudas	7	0	0	0	2	0	9	0
	(Greece) Giannis Gitsioudis	7	0	0	0	0	0	7	0
	(Greece) Takis Pantelis	1	0	0	0	0	0	1	0
Defenders
	(Greece) Nikos Alavantas	28	0	2	0	2	0	32	0
	(Socialist Federal Republic of Yugoslavia) Ivan Jurišić	22	0	1	0	2	0	25	0
	(Greece) Apostolos Tsourelas	22	0	0	0	2	0	24	0
	(Greece) Charis Baniotis	17	1	2	0	1	0	20	1
	(Greece) Giannis Psarras	17	1	1	0	0	0	18	1
	(Greece) Kostas Malioufas	9	0	1	0	0	0	10	0
	(Greece) Pantelis Sachanidis	1	0	0	0	0	0	1	0
Midfielders
	(Greece) Thomas Singas	29	2	2	0	2	0	33	2
	(Greece) Georgios Skartados	27	11	2	0	2	1	31	12
	(Greece) Dimitris Pittas	27	1	1	0	2	0	30	1
	(Greece) Vasilios Vasilakos	26	3	1	0	2	1	29	4
	(Greece) Kyriakos Alexandridis	22	1	2	0	1	0	25	1
	(Greece) Nikos Liakos	16	1	1	0	0	0	17	1
	(Greece) Sotiris Mavromatis	12	0	1	0	0	0	13	0
Forwards
	(Greece) Aris Karasavvidis	24	2	2	1	1	0	27	3
	(Greece) Kostas Orfanos	23	1	2	0	2	0	27	1
	(Greece) Giorgos Kostikos	14	5	2	0	1	0	17	5
	(Socialist Federal Republic of Yugoslavia) Rade Paprica	9	1	1	0	2	0	12	1
	(Greece) Michalis Iordanidis	7	1	0	0	0	0	7	1
	(Greece) Stefanos Borbokis	1	0	0	0	0	0	1	0

Source: Match reports in competitive matches, RSSSF

=== Goalscorers ===
Rank	No.	Pos.	Player	Alpha Ethniki	Greek Cup	European Cup	Total
1		MF	(Greece) Georgios Skartados	11	0	1	12
2		FW	(Greece) Georgios Kostikos	5	0	0	5
3		MF	(Greece) Vasilios Vasilakos	3	0	1	4
4		FW	(Greece) Aris Karasavvidis	2	1	0	3
5		MF	(Greece) Thomas Singas	2	0	0	2
5		MF	(Greece) Sotiris Mavromatis	2	0	0	2
7		FW	(Greece) Kostas Orfanos	1	0	0	1
7		MF	(Greece) Kyriakos Alexandridis	1	0	0	1
7		MF	(Greece) Dimitris Pittas	1	0	0	1
7		MF	(Greece) Nikos Liakos	1	0	0	1
7		DF	(Greece) Giannis Psarras	1	0	0	1
7		DF	(Greece) Charis Baniotis	1	0	0	1
7		FW	(Socialist Federal Republic of Yugoslavia) Rade Paprica	1	0	0	1
7		FW	(Greece) Michalis Iordanidis	1	0	0	1
TOTALS				33	1	2	36

Source: Match reports in competitive matches, RSSSF
