= 1984 Greek Football Cup final =

1984 Greek Cup final
- Event: 1983–84 Greek Football Cup
Panathinaikos	AEL
2	0
- Date: 6 June 1984
- Venue: Olympic Stadium, Marousi, Athens
- Referee: Makis Germanakos (Athens)
- Attendance: 73,829

The 1984 Greek Cup final was the 40th final of the Greek Cup. The match took place on 6 June 1984 at the Olympic Stadium. The contesting teams were Panathinaikos and AEL. It was Panathinaikos' fifteenth Greek Cup final in their 76 years of existence and AEL's second Greek Cup final in their 20-year history. With a record attendance of 73,829 spectators, Panathinaikos won the Cup and achieved the domestic double, biding their farewell to their captain, Anthimos Kapsis, with the best possible way.

== Venue ==
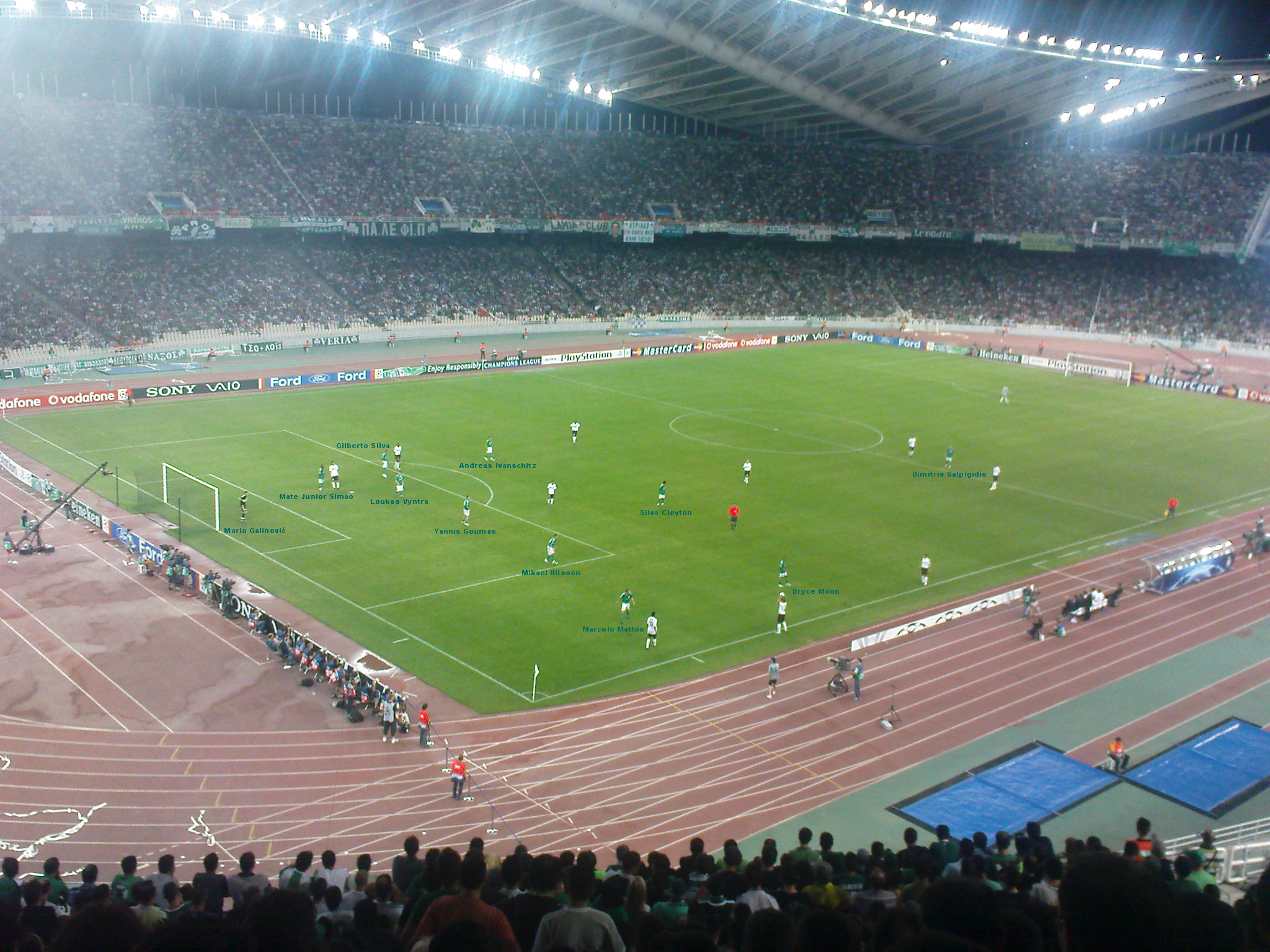
Athens Olympic Stadium.

This was the second Greek Cup final held at the Athens Olympic Stadium, after the 1983 final.

The Athens Olympic Stadium was built in 1982. The stadium is used as a venue for Greece. Its current capacity is 80,000 and hosted a European Cup final in 1983.

== Background ==
Panathinaikos had reached the Greek Cup final fourteen times, winning seven of them. The last time that they played in a final was in 1982, where they had won against AEL by 1–0.

AEL had reached the Greek Cup final one time, in 1982, where they had lost to Panathinaikos by 1–0.

The two teams had met each other in a Cup final one time in the 1982 final.

== Route to the final ==
Panathinaikos				Round	AEL			
Opponent	Agg.	1st leg	2nd leg		Opponent	Agg.	1st leg	2nd leg
Almopos Aridea	5–0 (H)			First round	Kozani	2–0 (a.e.t.) (H)		
Thiva	2–0 (H)			Additional round	Bye			
Paniliakos	6–0	5–0 (A)	1–0 (H)	Round of 32	Achaiki	10–1	10–0 (H)	0–1 (A)
Kallithea	1–0	1–0 (A)	0–0 (H)	Round of 16	AEK Athens	2–1	1–0 (A)	1–1 (H)
Ethnikos Piraeus	4–0	2–0 (A)	2–0 (H)	Quarter-finals	Kavala	3–0	3–0 (A)	0–0 (H)
Egaleo	7–0	3–0 (A)	4–0 (H)	Semi-finals	Iraklis	1–0	1–0 (H)	0–0 (A)

== Match ==
=== Details ===
6 June 1984
21:00 EEST

Panathinaikos	2–0	AEL
Galitsios 27' (o.g.); Antoniou 39'	Report

Olympic Stadium, Marousi
Attendance: 73,829
Referee: Makis Germanakos (Athens)

Panathinaikos	AEL

GK	(Bulgaria) Tomas Lafchis
DF	(Greece) Konstantinos Tarasis
DF	(Greece) Nikos Karoulias
DF	(Greece) Anthimos Kapsis (c)
DF	(Greece) Kostas Mavridis
MF	(Greece) Giannis Kyrastas
MF	(Greece) Grigoris Papavasileiou
MF	(Greece) Kostas Antoniou
MF	(Argentina) Juan Ramón Rocha
FW	(Greece) Thanasis Dimopoulos	(substituted off) 83'
FW	(Greece) Grigoris Charalampidis	(substituted off) 88'
Substitutes:
MF	(Greece) Michalis Gerothodoros	(substituted on) 83'
MF	(Greece) Kostas Tassopoulos	(substituted on) 88'
Manager:
(Poland) Jacek Gmoch

GK	(Greece) Georgios Plitsis
DF	(Greece) Takis Parafestas (c)
DF	(Greece) Nikos Patsiavouras
DF	(Greece) Giannis Galitsios
DF	(Greece) Georgios Mitsibonas
MF	(Greece) Theodoros Voutiritsas
MF	(Greece) Lazaros Kyrilidis	(substituted off) 46'
MF	(Greece) Christos Andreoudis
FW	(Poland) Kazimierz Kmiecik	(substituted off) 72'
FW	(Greece) Kostas Maloumidis
FW	(Greece) Michalis Ziogas
Substitutes:
MF	(Greece) Sakis Tsiolis	(substituted on) 46'
MF	(Greece) Giannis Gampetas	(substituted on) 72'
Manager:
(Austria) Walter Skocik

Assistant referees:
Christos Kolokythas (Athens)
Stelios Landrakis (Athens)

Match rules

- 90 minutes
- 30 minutes of extra time if necessary
- Penalty shootout if scores still level
- Five named substitutes
- Maximum of two substitutions

== See also ==
- 1983–84 Greek Football Cup
