= Christos Michail =

Greek footballer and coach

Personal information
- Full name: Christos Michail
- Date of birth: 28 February 1962 (age 64)
- Place of birth: Serres, Greece
- Position: Goalkeeper

Senior career*
Years	Team	Apps	(Gls)
1981–1994	AEL	207	(0)
1994–1995	Ionikos	14	(0)
1995–1996	AEL	6	(0)
Total		227	(0)

International career
1987	Greece	1	(0)

Managerial career
- 2006–2014: AEL (goalkeeping coach)
- * Club domestic league appearances and goals

Christos Michail (Greek: Χρήστος Μιχαήλ; born 28 February 1962) is a former football goalkeeper and currently goalkeeping coach.

== Career ==
He started his career from Panserraikos. In 1980, he went to AEL, where he played until 1994. During his presence in Larissa he won one Greek Championship and one Greek Cup. In 1994, he moved to Ionikos, where he played for one year and next season returned to AEL. One year later he went to Apollon Larisas, where he ended his career. He was in the Greece national team for one game, Greece against Netherlands for Euro 1988 qualification round.

== Honours ==
AEL

- Alpha Ethniki: 1987–88
- Greek Cup: 1984–85
