= Takis Pantelis =

Greek footballer

Personal information
- Full name: Panagiotis Pantelis
- Date of birth: 18 May 1955 (age 71)
- Place of birth: Athens, Greece
- Height: 1.89 m (6 ft 2 in)
- Position: Goalkeeper

Youth career
- 1969–1973: Apollon Athens

Senior career*
Years	Team	Apps	(Gls)
1973–1981	Apollon Athens	125	(0)
1981–1987	PAOK	58	(0)
1987–1988	Panionios	4	(0)
Total		187	(0)

International career
1981	Greece	3	(0)

Managerial career
- 2010–2011: Acharnaikos (goalkeeper coach)
- 2013–2014: A.O. Saronikos Aegina (goalkeeper coach)
- 2016: Kallithea (caretaker)
- 2024: AE Chalandri (goalkeeper coach)
- 2025: Apollon Athens (goalkeeper coach)
- * Club domestic league appearances and goals

Takis Pantelis (Greek: Τάκης Παντέλης; born 18 May 1955) is a Greek former international footballer who played as a goalkeeper.

== Career ==
=== Club career ===
Pantelis began his football career at Apollon Athens in 1969, at the age of 14. On 9 June 1974, he made his first-team debut in a league match against Panionios. After eight years with Apollon and 125 league appearances, he was transferred to PAOK in the summer of 1981. He was the team's starting goalkeeper during the 1984–85 season when PAOK won their second league title in the club's history. He made a total of 70 apps with the White-blacks of the North (recording 58 league apps, 10 Greek Cup apps and 2 apps in a European competition) and in 1987, he moved to Panionios and played for one season. He ended his career at Mandraikos in the 4th Division. Pantelis made a total of 187 apps in the Greek Championship.

=== International career ===
Pantelis had 3 caps for the Greece national team in 1981. He made his international debut in a friendly encounter against Sweden (Thessaloniki, 23 September, 2–1) and also played in two games for the 1982 FIFA World Cup qualification, against Italy (Florence, 14 November, 1–1) and Yugoslavia (Piraeus, 29 November, 1–2).

== Career statistics ==
Club	Division	Season	Apps
Apollon Athens	Alpha Ethniki	1973–74	2
Apollon Athens	Beta Ethniki	1974–75	
Apollon Athens	Alpha Ethniki	1975–76	12
Apollon Athens	Alpha Ethniki	1976–77	20
Apollon Athens	Alpha Ethniki	1977–78	6
Apollon Athens	Alpha Ethniki	1978–79	28
Apollon Athens	Alpha Ethniki	1979–80	27
Apollon Athens	Alpha Ethniki	1980–81	30
Apollon Athens	Total		125
PAOK	Alpha Ethniki	1981–82	20
PAOK	Alpha Ethniki	1982–83	7
PAOK	Alpha Ethniki	1983–84	6
PAOK	Alpha Ethniki	1984–85	24
PAOK	Alpha Ethniki	1985–86	1
PAOK	Alpha Ethniki	1986–87	0
PAOK	Total		58
Panionios	Alpha Ethniki	1987–88	4
Career total			187

Source: RSSSF

== Honours ==
Apollon Athens

- Beta Ethniki: 1974–75

PAOK

- Alpha Ethniki: 1984–85
