= Rade Paprica =

Bosnian footballer (born 1956)

Personal information
- Full name: Rade Paprica
- Date of birth: 29 November 1956 (age 69)
- Place of birth: Foča, FPR Yugoslavia
- Position: Forward

Senior career*
Years	Team	Apps	(Gls)
–1977	Sutjeska Foča		
1977–1984	Željezničar Sarajevo	164	(50)
1984–1986	PAOK	39	(7)
1986	Željezničar Sarajevo	17	(9)
1986–1987	Beşiktaş	19	(3)
1987–1988	Apollon Kalamarias	25	(6)
1988–1991	APOP Paphos		
Total		264	(75)
- * Club domestic league appearances and goals

Rade Paprica (born 29 November 1956) is a Bosnian retired professional footballer who played in the former Yugoslavia, Greece and Turkey.

== Club career ==
Born in Foča, SR Bosnia and Herzegovina, SFR Yugoslavia, Paprica started playing at local FK Sutjeska Foča. From 1977 to 1984 he played for local powerhouse Željezničar.

Paprica played for Greek side PAOK from 1984 to 1986. He was a vital member of the squad that won the Greek league title in 1985. A defining moment of the 1984–85 season occurred on 20 January 1985 (matchday 15), when he scored the decisive goal with a diving header in a crucial match against Panathinaikos at the Olympic Stadium of Athens.

He also played for Beşiktaş for a year, Apollon Kalamarias the next year, and went to Cyprus to play for APOP Paphos for three years (1988–1991).

== Post-playing career ==
After retiring from playing football in 1992, Paprica moved to Thessaloniki where he worked as a coach in PAOK's youth team.

== Honours ==
PAOK

- Alpha Ethniki: 1984–85
