= Aris Karasavvidis =

Greek footballer (born 1965)

Personal information
- Full name: Aristeidis Karasavvidis
- Date of birth: 13 March 1965 (age 61)
- Place of birth: Dafni, Pella, Greece
- Position: Forward

Youth career
- 1977–1981: Aetos Skydra

Senior career*
Years	Team	Apps	(Gls)
1981–1984	Aetos Skydra		
1984–1989	PAOK	95	(14)
1989–1993	Apollon Athens	122	(41)
1993–1995	PAOK	29	(4)
1995–1996	Trikala		
1996–1997	Apollon Kalamarias		
1997–1998	Lamia		
1998–1999	Edessaikos		

International career
1986–1988	Greece U21		
1988–1993	Greece	5	(0)
Medal record
Men's football
Representing Greece
UEFA European Under-21 Championship
Runner-up	1988
- * Club domestic league appearances and goals

Aris Karasavvidis (Greek: Άρης Καρασαββίδης; born 13 March 1965) is a former Greek international footballer who played as a forward. He was the top goalscorer of the 1988 UEFA European Under-21 Championship.

== Career ==
=== Early career ===
Karasavvidis moved to Greece from Germany in 1977 at the age of 12 and joined the youth academy of Aetos Skydras. He was promoted to the senior team during the 1981–82 season at the age of 16. Over the next three seasons (1981–1984), he established himself as a key forward for the club, performing well in local and amateur national divisions. His goalscoring ability drew the attention of top-tier Greek clubs, leading to a high-profile transfer to PAOK in the summer of 1984.

=== PAOK and Apollon Athens ===
Karasavvidis made his professional debut in the Alpha Ethniki with PAOK during the 1984–85 season. In his debut year, he contributed four goals to help PAOK clinch the 1985 Greek league title. He remained with the Thessaloniki-based club until December 1989, making 95 league appearances and scoring 14 goals.

In late 1989, he transferred to Apollon Athens. He enjoyed the most prolific goalscoring period of his career with Apollon, netting 41 goals in 122 league matches over a four-year span. His strong performances earned him a return to PAOK in December 1993, where he played for another one and a half seasons, adding 29 appearances and 4 goals to his tally.

=== Later career ===
In 1995, Karasavvidis entered the final stages of his career, playing for several clubs in the Greek lower divisions. He spent the 1995–96 season with Trikala, followed by single-season stints at Apollon Kalamarias (1996–97), Lamia (1997–98), and finally Edessaikos (1998–99), where he retired from professional football.

=== International career ===
Karasavvidis was a prominent member of the Greece under-21 national team. He played a pivotal role in Greece's historic run to the final of the 1988 UEFA European Under-21 Championship. Most notably, he scored four goals in a 5–0 semifinal win against the Netherlands, finishing as the tournament's overall top goalscorer. Between 1988 and 1993, he also earned 5 caps for the Greece senior national team.

== Career statistics ==
=== Club career ===
Aris Karasavvidis in the Greek Championship
Club	Division	Season	Apps	Goals
PAOK	Alpha Ethniki	1984–85	17	4
PAOK	Alpha Ethniki	1985–86	24	2
PAOK	Alpha Ethniki	1986–87	4	0
PAOK	Alpha Ethniki	1987–88	21	4
PAOK	Alpha Ethniki	1988–89	24	4
PAOK	Alpha Ethniki	1989–90 (i)	5	0
PAOK Total (1st spell)			95	14
Apollon Athens	Alpha Ethniki	1989–90 (ii)	20	7
Apollon Athens	Alpha Ethniki	1990–91	30	11
Apollon Athens	Alpha Ethniki	1991–92	30	10
Apollon Athens	Alpha Ethniki	1992–93	30	8
Apollon Athens	Alpha Ethniki	1993–94 (i)	12	5
Apollon Athens Total			122	41
PAOK	Alpha Ethniki	1993–94 (ii)	17	2
PAOK	Alpha Ethniki	1994–95	12	2
PAOK Total (2nd spell)			29	4
Career Total (Alpha Ethniki)			246	59

Source: RSSSF

=== International career ===
National team	Year	Caps
Greece
Greece	1988	1
Greece	1989	1
Greece	1990	1
Greece	1992	1
Greece	1993	1
Total		5

== Honours ==
PAOK

- Alpha Ethniki: 1984–85

Greece U21

- UEFA European Under-21 Championship runner-up: 1988

Individual

- UEFA European Under-21 Championship top scorer: 1988 (5 goals)
