= 1983–84 Greek Football Cup =

1983–84 Greek Cup
Tournament details
- Country: Greece
- Teams: 76

Final positions
- Champions: Panathinaikos (8th title)
- Runners-up: AEL

Tournament statistics
- Matches played: 105
- Goals scored: 268 (2.55 per match)

The 1983–84 Greek Football Cup was the 42nd edition of the Greek Football Cup.

== Tournament details ==
Totally 76 teams participated, 16 from Alpha Ethniki, 20 from Beta, and 40 from Gamma. It was held in 7 rounds, included final. An additional round was held between first and second, with 6 matches, in order that the teams would continue to be 32. Concerning the previous years, there are single matches only in the first round.

The third round was the most interesting phase of competition. The winners of previous season, AEK Athens were eliminated by AEL. Iraklis qualified for second possessed year against Aris. Also, Ethnikos Piraeus qualified after 44 years against Olympiacos in Piraeus derby, with two draws by 0–0 and 1–1, respectively. It's remarkable that, while both matches had become in Karaiskakis Stadium, the common home of two clubs, Ethnikos was formally away team in the second leg, so they qualified with away goals rule. AEL's win against Achaiki in the Second Round was impressive (10-0, 5 goals by Michalis Ziogas).

The final was contested by Panathinaikos and AEL, such as 2 years before. The match was held at Athens Olympic Stadium. Panathinaikos won 2–0, achieving the double for that season. The match was the last one for Panathinaikos' captain, Anthimos Kapsis. There were 73,829 spectators, a record attendance for a Greek Cup Final.

== Calendar ==
Round	Date(s)	Fixtures	Clubs	New entries
First Round	21–23, 29 December 1983	38	76 → 38	76
Additional Round	4, 5 January 1984	6	38 → 32	none
Round of 32	25, 26 January, 2, 22, 23 February & 1 March 1984	32	32 → 16	none
Round of 16	21, 22 March & 4, 5 April 1984	16	16 → 8	none
Quarter-finals	9, 23 May 1984	8	8 → 4	none
Semi-finals	27 May, 3 June 1984	4	4 → 2	none
Final	6 June 1984	1	2 → 1	none

== Knockout phase ==
Each tie in the knockout phase, apart from the first two rounds and the final, was played over two legs, with each team playing one leg at home. The team that scored more goals on aggregate over the two legs advanced to the next round. If the aggregate score was level, the away goals rule was applied, i.e. the team that scored more goals away from home over the two legs advanced. If away goals were also equal, then extra time was played. The away goals rule was again applied after extra time, i.e. if there were goals scored during extra time and the aggregate score was still level, the visiting team advanced by virtue of more away goals scored. If no goals were scored during extra time, the winners were decided by a penalty shoot-out. In the first two rounds and the final, which were played as a single match, if the score was level at the end of normal time, extra time was played, followed by a penalty shoot-out if the score was still level.
The mechanism of the draws for each round is as follows:

- There are no seedings, and teams from the same group can be drawn against each other.

== First round ==
Team 1	Score	Team 2
Levadiakos	1–0	Panegialios
Kallithea	2–0	Aiolikos
Proodeftiki	0–1	PAOK
Niki Volos	3–1	Trikala
Thriamvos Athens	2–0	Eordaikos
AEL	2–0 (a.e.t.)	Kozani
Edessaikos	1–2	Panionios
Atromitos	4–1	Acharnaikos
Aspida Xanthi	1–0 (a.e.t.)	Anagennisi Epanomi
Thiva	2–0	Lamia
Aris	4–1	Toxotis Volos
Irodotos	0–1	Apollon Athens
Makedonikos	3–0	Kastoria
Panachaiki	2–1 (a.e.t.)	Panelefsiniakos
Egaleo	1–0	Anagennisi Karditsa
Panathinaikos	5–0	Almopos Aridea
Pontioi Kozani	1–2	Pierikos
Pannafpliakos	0–3 (a.e.t.)	Panserraikos
Kavala	6–2	Florina
A.E. Nikea	2–2 (4–5 p)	Xanthi
Naoussa	1–0	Fostiras
Paniliakos	2–1	Neapoli Piraeus
Ilisiakos	0–2	PAS Giannina
Korinthos	0–1 (a.e.t.)	Achaiki
Chania	3–2	Ethnikos Asteras
Iraklis	4–1	Doxa Drama
Ethnikos Piraeus	4–0	Athinaikos
Anagennisi Arta	2–1	Agrotikos Asteras
APE Langadas	1–2 (a.e.t.)	Veria
Diagoras	0–0 (4–5 p)	AEK Athens
Vyzas Megara	3–2	Panetolikos
Olympiacos Volos	1–2	Anagennisi Giannitsa
Panthrakikos	1–0	Odysseas Kordelio
Kilkisiakos	2–0	Alexandroupoli
Chalkida	0–2	OFI
Olympiacos	6–0	Polykastro
Ionikos	1–0 (a.e.t.)	Rodos
Apollon Kalamarias	3–0	Atromitos Piraeus

== Additional round ==
Team 1	Score	Team 2
Kavala	2–0	Chania
Panathinaikos	2–0	Thiva
Anagennisi Giannitsa	0–2	AEK Athens
Panionios	3–0	Levadiakos
Apollon Kalamarias	1–0	Panachaiki
Xanthi	2–0	Pierikos

== Bracket ==
Round of 32
Aspida Xanthi	2	0	2
Makedonikos	0	3	3
Vyzas Megara	0	2	2
Egaleo	0	3	3
Naoussa	0	0	0
Panionios	1	3	4
Xanthi	1	0	1
Ionikos	2	1	3
Ethnikos Piraeus	4	1	5
PAS Giannina	0	0	0
Olympiacos	4	2	6
Apollon Kalamarias	1	1	2
Paniliakos	0	0	0
Panathinaikos	1	5	6
Panthrakikos	0	1	1
Kallithea	0	2	2
Apollon Athens	0	0	0
AEK Athens	1	2	3
AEL	10	0	10
Achaiki	0	1	1
Atromitos	0	1	1
Kavala	0	3	3
Thriamvos Athens	1	1	2
Panserraikos	1	2	3
Veria	1	0	1
Anagennisi Arta	1	1	2
Niki Volos	2	0	2
PAOK	2	4	6
Kilkisiakos	1	1	2
Iraklis	2	4	6
Aris (a)	0	2	2
OFI	0	2	2

Round of 16
Makedonikos	2	1	3
Egaleo	1	3	4
Panionios	1	3	4
Ionikos	0	1	1
Ethnikos Piraeus (a)	0	1	1
Olympiacos	0	1	1
Panathinaikos	0	1	1
Kallithea	0	0	0
AEK Athens	0	1	1
AEL	1	1	2
Kavala	2	3	5
Panserraikos	0	2	2
Anagennisi Arta	1	0	1
PAOK	1	3	4
Iraklis (a)	4	1	4
Aris	0	4	4

Quarter-finals
Egaleo	1	0	1
Panionios	0	0	0
Ethnikos Piraeus	0	0	0
Panathinaikos	2	2	4
AEL	3	0	3
Kavala	0	0	0
PAOK	0	1	1
Iraklis	0	4	4

Semi-finals
Egaleo	0	0	0
Panathinaikos	3	4	7
AEL	1	0	1
Iraklis	0	0	0

Final
Panathinaikos	2
AEL	0

== Round of 32 ==
Team 1	Agg.	Team 2	1st leg	2nd leg
Olympiacos	6–2	Apollon Kalamarias	4–1	2–1
AEL	10–1	Achaiki	10–0	0–1
Niki Volos	2–6	PAOK	2–2	0–4
Vyzas Megara	2–3	Egaleo	0–0	2–3
Panthrakikos	1–2	Kallithea	0–0	1–2
Thriamvos Athens	2–3	Panserraikos	1–1	1–2
Atromitos	1–3	Kavala	0–0	1–3
Kilkisiakos	2–6	Iraklis	1–2	1–4
Veria	1–2	Anagennisi Arta	1–1	0–1
Aris	(a) 2–2	OFI	0–0	2–2
Paniliakos	0–6	Panathinaikos	0–5	0–1
Aspida Xanthi	2–3	Makedonikos	2–0	0–3
Apollon Athens	0–3	AEK Athens	0–1	0–2
Xanthi	1–3	Ionikos	1–2	0–1
Naoussa	0–4	Panionios	0–1	0–3
Ethnikos Piraeus	5–0	PAS Giannina	4–0	1–0

== Round of 16 ==
Team 1	Agg.	Team 2	1st leg	2nd leg
Panionios	4–1	Ionikos	1–0	3–1
AEK Athens	1–2	AEL	0–1	1–1
Kavala	5–2	Panserraikos	2–0	3–2
Anagennisi Arta	1–4	PAOK	1–1	0–3
Panathinaikos	1–0	Kallithea	0–0	1–0
Iraklis	(a) 4–4	Aris	3–0	1–4
Makedonikos	3–4	Egaleo	2–1	1–3
Ethnikos Piraeus	(a) 1–1	Olympiacos	0–0	1–1

== Quarter-finals ==
Team 1	Agg.	Team 2	1st leg	2nd leg
Ethnikos Piraeus	0–4	Panathinaikos	0–2	0–2
AEL	3–0	Kavala	3–0	0–0
PAOK	1–4	Iraklis	0–0	1–4
Egaleo	1–0	Panionios	1–0	0–0

== Semi-finals ==
Team 1	Agg.	Team 2	1st leg	2nd leg
AEL	1–0	Iraklis	1–0	0–0
Egaleo	0–7	Panathinaikos	0–3	0–4

== Final ==
6 June 1984
21:00 EEST

Panathinaikos	2–0	AEL
Galitsios 27' (o.g.); Antoniou 39'	Report

Olympic Stadium, Marousi
Attendance: 73,829
Referee: Makis Germanakos (Athens)
