= Ivan Jurišić (footballer, born 1956) =

Serbian footballer

Personal information
- Full name: Ivan Jurišić
- Date of birth: 15 March 1956 (age 70)
- Place of birth: Zrenjanin, FPR Yugoslavia
- Position: Centre back

Senior career*
Years	Team	Apps	(Gls)
1974–1977	Proleter Zrenjanin	83	(2)
1978–1984	Red Star Belgrade	127	(2)
1984–1987	PAOK	68	(0)
1989–1990	Apollon Kalamarias	18	(3)
Total		296	(7)
- * Club domestic league appearances and goals

Ivan Jurišić (Serbian Cyrillic: Иван Јуришић, born 15 March 1956) is a former Serbian footballer who played as a central defender for Red Star Belgrade and PAOK.

== Career ==
=== Red Star Belgrade ===
After beginning his senior career with Proleter Zrenjanin, Jurišić transferred to Red Star Belgrade in January 1978. He established himself as a reliable and tough defender, spending six and a half seasons with the Belgrade giants. During this highly successful period, he won three Yugoslav First League titles (1979–80, 1980–81, and 1983–84) and one Yugoslav Cup in 1982. A major highlight of his spell with Red Star was reaching the final of the 1978–79 UEFA Cup, where he featured as a starting defender in both legs of the final against Borussia Mönchengladbach. However, in the first leg held in Belgrade, he had an unfortunate moment in the 60th minute when he scored an own goal, which leveled the match at 1–1 and ultimately contributed to Red Star losing the trophy on aggregate after the second leg. In total, he made 127 league appearances and scored two goals for the club.

=== PAOK and later career ===
In the summer of 1984, Jurišić moved to Greece, signing with PAOK. In his debut season (1984–85), he made an immediate impact, solidifying the club's defense and playing a crucial role as PAOK clinched the 1985 Greek league title. He remained in Thessaloniki for three seasons, recording 68 league appearances. After a brief hiatus, he concluded his professional career during the 1989–90 season with a brief stint at Apollon Kalamarias, making 18 league appearances and scoring three goals before retiring.

== Honours ==
Red Star Belgrade

- Yugoslav First League: 1979–80, 1980–81, 1983–84
- Yugoslav Cup: 1981–82
- UEFA Cup runner-up: 1978–79

PAOK

- Alpha Ethniki: 1984–85
