= Krzysztof Adamczyk =

Polish footballer and manager

Personal information
- Date of birth: 14 February 1956 (age 70)
- Place of birth: Gdańsk, Poland
- Height: 1.80 m (5 ft 11 in)
- Positions: Attacking midfielder; supporting striker

Youth career
- 1970–1976: Gedania Gdańsk

Senior career*
Years	Team	Apps	(Gls)
1976–1977	Stoczniowiec Gdańsk		
1977–1978	Arka Gdynia	30	(7)
1978	Zawisza Bydgoszcz		
1979–1984	Legia Warsaw	126	(42)
1984–1987	AEL	70	(14)
1987–1988	VÖEST Linz	15	(1)
1988–1990	Apollon Limassol	40	(6)

International career
1980–1981	Poland	3	(0)

Managerial career
- 2002–2004: Orlęta Radzyń Podlaski
- 2009: Narew Ostrołęka
- 2013: Górnik Konin
- 2016–2017: Wicher Kobyłka
- * Club domestic league appearances and goals

Krzysztof Adamczyk (born 2 February 1956) is a Polish football manager and former player.

He was the top scorer of the 1980–81 Ekstraklasa season for Legia Warsaw, scoring 18 times.

Adamczyk was also a key player during the golden era of AEL, the Greek team that won both the league and the national cup in the 1980s. His performance in the 1984–85 Greek Cup final, a 4–1 victory over PAOK, remains well remembered in Larissa. He is considered one of the club's greatest players and a fan favorite.

== Honours ==
Legia Warsaw

- Polish Cup: 1979–80, 1980–81

AEL

- Greek Cup: 1984–85

Individual

- Ekstraklasa top scorer: 1980–81
