= Anthimos Kapsis =

Greek footballer

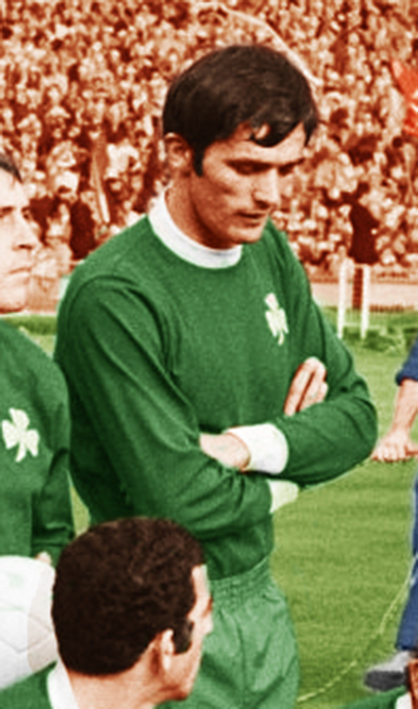
- Kapsis in 1971

Personal information
- Date of birth: 3 September 1950 (age 76)
- Place of birth: Astypalaia, Greece
- Height: 1.85 m (6 ft 1 in)
- Position: Libero

Senior career*
Years	Team	Apps	(Gls)
1969–1984	Panathinaikos	319	(5)

International career
1971–1982	Greece	35	(0)

Managerial career
- 1992–1993: PAS Giannina
- * Club domestic league appearances and goals

Anthimos Kapsis (Greek: Άνθιμος Καψής; born 3 September 1950) is a Greek former International footballer who played as a sweeper.

== Career ==
Born in Astypalaia, Kapsis' family moved to Keratsini when he was young. Kapsis played for the Panathinaikos F.C. from 1969 until 1984 and was a member of that team when it played in Wembley Stadium, located in London, England, in the 1971 European Cup Final.

As player of Panthinaikos he won five greek championships (1969, 1970, 1972, 1977, 1984), four greek cups (1969, 1977, 1982, 1984) and one Balkans Cup (1977).

Kapsis was capped 36 times by the Greece national team and was a member of the team that competed in Euro 1980. He was also selected to an all-European squad that faced a South American one in a charity game.

== Personal life ==
He is the father of Michalis Kapsis (born 1973), who is also a football player and was included in the squad of Euro 2004 that went on to win the tournament.

== See also ==
- List of one-club men in association football
