= 1984–85 Greek Football Cup =

1984–85 Greek Cup
Tournament details
- Country: Greece
- Teams: 76

Final positions
- Champions: AEL (1st title)
- Runners-up: PAOK

Tournament statistics
- Matches played: 105
- Goals scored: 328 (3.12 per match)

The 1984–85 Greek Football Cup was the 43rd edition of the Greek Football Cup.

== Tournament details ==
Totally 76 teams participated, 16 from Alpha Ethniki, 20 from Beta, and 40 from Gamma. It was held in 7 rounds, included final. An additional round was held between first and second, with 6 matches, in order that the teams would continue to be 32.

It was the first Greek Cup final since 1980, where the two finalists were clubs not based on Attica, AEL and PAOK. The two teams had lost in the four previous Finals. PAOK had eliminated two fellow-citizens, Iraklis and Aris, in the two first rounds, and cup holders Panathinaikos in the semi-finals with an impressive second-leg 4–0 home victory(4–2 on aggregate). AEL had eliminated only one Alpha Ethniki team, Apollon Kalamarias, in the additional round. However, they had won with big scores their opponents from lowest divisions: Panegialios with 8–0, Neapoli Piraeus with 7–0, Korinthos with 6–1 and Levadiakos with 5–0.

From the interests of the year were the qualification of Panathinaikos against Olympiacos, in the third round, with two wins in the Olympic Stadium, the common home of both teams. Also, the elimination of AEK Athens for the first time from a Gamma Ethniki team, Lamia, that afterwards was crushed, accepting in total 15 goals from PAOK in the third round. Also, in the first round, Olympiacos Volos eliminated Acharnaikos in penalty shootout 1–0, after a goalless draw, where after 9 penalties only was scored. OFI were eliminated in the first round by Odysseas Kordelio.

In the final, AEL gained their first title in their history, winning PAOK 4–1. Simultaneously, they deprived The Double by PAOK, that won the championship of that year. It is remarkable that PAOK's coach, Austrian Walter Skotzik, was the coach of AEL in previous season, when they lost in the final by Panathinaikos. An interesting story of the final was that PAOK's top goalscorer of that season Christos Dimopoulos didn't participate as he left the team at airport of Athens when they arrived from Thessaloniki for the game. Dimopoulos headed to the headquarters of Motor Oil (company of Panathinaikos‘ president Vardinogiannis) in order to seal his transfer to Panathinaikos as his 5-year contract with PAOK was expiring.

== Calendar ==
Round	Date(s)	Fixtures	Clubs	New entries
First Round	31 October & 1, 8, 15 November 1984	38	76 → 38	76
Additional Round	22 November 1984	6	38 → 32	none
Round of 32	28 December 1984 & 17 January 1985	32	32 → 16	none
Round of 16	7, 21 February, 7 March 1985	16	16 → 8	none
Quarter-finals	3 April, 8 May 1985	8	8 → 4	none
Semi-finals	22 May & 4,5 June 1985	4	4 → 2	none
Final	22 June 1985	1	2 → 1	none

== Knockout phase ==
Each tie in the knockout phase, apart from the first two rounds and the final, was played over two legs, with each team playing one leg at home. The team that scored more goals on aggregate over the two legs advanced to the next round. If the aggregate score was level, the away goals rule was applied, i.e. the team that scored more goals away from home over the two legs advanced. If away goals were also equal, then extra time was played. The away goals rule was again applied after extra time, i.e. if there were goals scored during extra time and the aggregate score was still level, the visiting team advanced by virtue of more away goals scored. If no goals were scored during extra time, the winners were decided by a penalty shoot-out. In the first two rounds and the final, which were played as a single match, if the score was level at the end of normal time, extra time was played, followed by a penalty shoot-out if the score was still level.
The mechanism of the draws for each round is as follows:

- There are no seedings, and teams from the same group can be drawn against each other.

== First round ==
Team 1	Score	Team 2
Florina	2–1	Irodotos
Edessaikos	3–1 (a.e.t.)	A.E. Nikea
AEL	8–0	Panegialios
Aris	9–0	Chalkida
Apollon Athens	1–0	Athinaikos
Kastoria	2–0 (a.e.t.)	Alexandroupoli
Aias Salamina	0–2	Panachaiki
Thriamvos Athens	1–0	Kerkyra
Anagennisi Giannitsa	0–0 (1–3 p)	Ethnikos Alexandroupoli
Olympiacos	5–1	Elassona
PAOK	3–1	Iraklis
Makedonikos	2–0	Panetolikos
Korinthos	2–1	Egaleo
Kozani	4–2	APE Langadas
Proodeftiki	1–1 (4–2 p)	Vyzas Megara
Diagoras	3–1	Panserraikos
Ethnikos Piraeus	1–2 (a.e.t.)	Panathinaikos
Levadiakos	3–1	Xanthi
Kavala	1–0 (a.e.t.)	Trikala
Paniliakos	0–3	Anagennisi Arta
Naoussa	2–0	Chania
Thiva	6–2	Eordaikos
Neapoli Piraeus	2–1 (a.e.t.)	Polykastro
Pierikos	3–0	Niki Volos
Panelefsiniakos	1–0	Ionikos
Kallithea	2–1	Veria
Panarkadikos	1–0	Doxa Drama
Lamia	1–0	AEK Athens
Agrotikos Asteras	0–1	Ethnikos Asteras
Odysseas Kordeilo	3–1	OFI
Iraklis Kavala	1–4	Panionios
Olympiacos Volos	0–0 (1–0 p)	Acharnaikos
Aiolikos	3–1	Poseidon Michaniona
PAS Giannina	3–0	Almopos Aridea
Kilkisiakos	4–1	Aspida Xanthi
Fostiras	0–0 (5–3 p)	Atromitos
Charavgiakos	3–1	Rodos
Apollon Kalamarias	3–1	Anagennisi Karditsa

== Additional round ==
Team 1	Score	Team 2
Aris	2–0	Apollon Athens
AEL	1–0	Apollon Kalamarias
Levadiakos	5–2 (a.e.t.)	Ethnikos Alexandroupoli
Thiva	2–0	Charavgiakos
Panarkadikos	3–0	Odysseas Kordelio
Naoussa	0–0 (1–4 p)	Proodeftiki

== Bracket ==
Round of 32
Kozani	1	1	2
Fostiras	0	1	1
Kilkisiakos	1	0	1
Panarkadikos	0	2	2
Thiva	1	1	2
Proodeftiki	1	2	3
Edessaikos	1	0	1
Levadiakos	0	2	2
Kallithea	2	0	2
Makedonikos	2	5	7
AEL	7	1	8
Neapoli Piraeus	0	1	1
Diagoras	2	1	3
Korinthos	2	2	4
Panionios	3	0	3
PAS Giannina	1	0	1
Anagennisi Arta	1	0	1
Olympiacos	1	5	6
Panathinaikos	5	4	9
Panelefsiniakos	0	1	1
Florina	0	0	0
Panachaiki	1	2	3
Kavala (a)	1	1	2
Aiolikos	0	2	2
Pierikos	2	0	2
Ethnikos Asteras	0	1	1
Olympiacos Volos	2	0	2
Thriamvos Athens	1	0	1
PAOK (a)	2	1	3
Aris	0	3	3
Lamia	4	0	4
Kastoria	2	1	3

Round of 16
Kozani	1	1	2
Panarkadikos	0	3	3
Proodeftiki	5	1	6
Levadiakos	4	4	8
Makedonikos	0	3	3
AEL	2	4	6
Korinthos (p)	2	1	3(3)
Panionios	1	2	3(1)
Olympiacos	0	1	1
Panathinaikos	1	2	3
Panachaiki	0	0	0
Kavala	1	1	2
Pierikos	3	1	4
Olympiacos Volos	2	3	5
PAOK	6	9	15
Lamia	0	1	1

Quarter-finals
Panarkadikos	1	1	2
Levadiakos	0	4	4
AEL	6	0	7
Korinthos	1	2	3
Panathinaikos	1	0	1
Kavala	0	0	0
Olympiacos Volos	1	0	1
PAOK	4	2	6

Semi-finals
Levadiakos	0	0	0
AEL	2	5	7
Panathinaikos	2	0	2
PAOK	0	4	4

Final
AEL	4
PAOK	1

== Round of 32 ==
Team 1	Agg.	Team 2	1st leg	2nd leg
Florina	0–3	Panachaiki	0–1	0–2
Kilkisiakos	1–2	Panarkadikos	1–0	0–2
Kallithea	2–7	Makedonikos	2–2	0–5
Panathinaikos	9–1	Panelefsiniakos	5–0	4–1
Anagennisi Arta	1–6	Olympiacos	1–1	0–5
PAOK	(a) 3–3	Aris	2–0	1–3
Kavala	(a) 2–2	Aiolikos	1–0	1–2
Kozani	2–1	Fostiras	1–0	1–1
Diagoras	3–4	Korinthos	2–2	1–2
AEL	8–1	Neapoli Piraeus	7–0	1–1
Thiva	2–3	Proodeftiki	1–1	1–2
Edessaikos	1–2	Levadiakos	1–0	0–2
Pierikos	2–1	Ethnikos Asteras	2–0	0–1
Olympiacos Volos	2–1	Thriamvos Athens	2–1	0–0
Lamia	4–3	Kastoria	4–2	0–1
Panionios	3–1	PAS Giannina	3–1	0–0

== Round of 16 ==
Team 1	Agg.	Team 2	1st leg	2nd leg
Pierikos	4–5	Olympiacos Volos	3–2	1–3
Korinthos	3–3 (3–1 p)	Panionios	2–1	1–2
Makedonikos	3–6	AEL	0–2	3–4
Olympiacos	1–3	Panathinaikos	0–1	1–2
PAOK	15–1	Lamia	6–0	9–1
Proodeftiki	6–8	Levadiakos	5–4	1–4
Panachaiki	0–2	Kavala	0–1	0–1
Kozani	2–3	Panarkadikos	1–0	1–3

== Quarter-finals ==
Team 1	Agg.	Team 2	1st leg	2nd leg
Panathinaikos	1–0	Kavala	0–0	1–0
Olympiacos Volos	1–6	PAOK	1–4	0–2
AEL	7–3	Korinthos	6–1	1–2
Panarkadikos	2–4	Levadiakos	1–0	1–4

== Semi-finals ==
Team 1	Agg.	Team 2	1st leg	2nd leg
Levadiakos	0–7	AEL	0–2	0–5
Panathinaikos	2–4	PAOK	2–0	0–4

== Final ==
22 June 1985
21:00 EEST

AEL	4–1	PAOK
Ziogas 39', 73'; Kmiecik 47'; Valaoras 75'	Report	Skartados 55'

Olympic Stadium, Marousi
Attendance: 24,994
Referee: Makis Germanakos (Athens)
