= Christos Yfantidis =

Greek footballer

Personal information
- Date of birth: 30 November 1952 (age 73)
- Place of birth: Akrolimni, Greece
- Position: Forward

Senior career*
Years	Team	Apps	(Gls)
1972–1978	Veria		
1978–1982	Panathinaikos		
1982–1987	Doxa Drama		

International career
1978–1980	Greece	7	(3)

Managerial career
- 1994: Naoussa
- * Club domestic league appearances and goals

Christos Yfantidis (Greek: Xρήστος Yφαντίδης; born 30 November 1952) is a retired Greek football striker.
