= Kazimierz Kmiecik =

Polish footballer (born 1951)

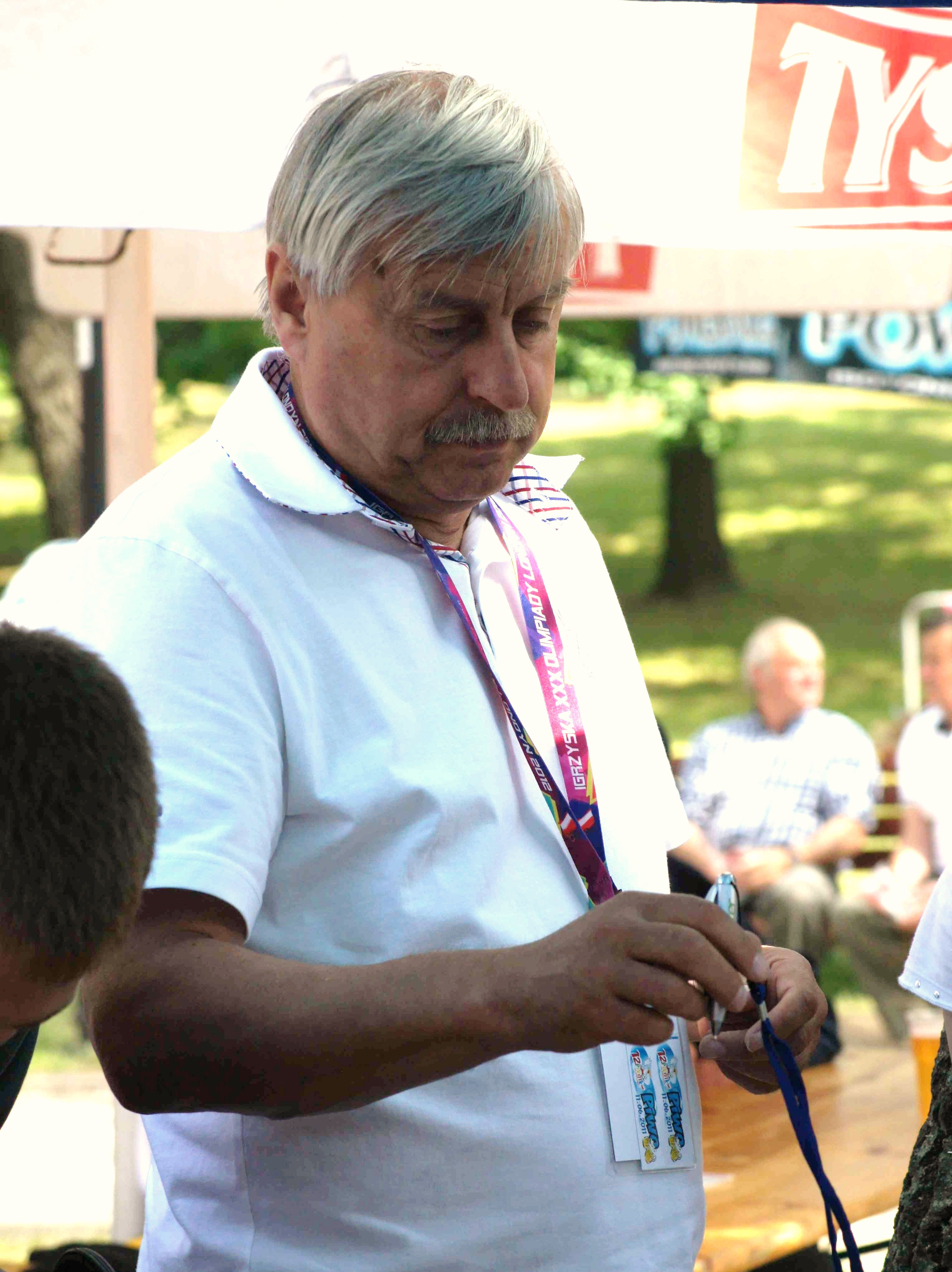
- Kmiecik in 2011

Personal information
- Date of birth: 19 September 1951 (age 75)
- Place of birth: Węgrzce Wielkie, Poland
- Height: 1.75 m (5 ft 9 in)
- Position: Striker

Team information
- Current team: Wisła Kraków (assistant)

Senior career*
| Years | Team | Apps | (Gls) |
| 1967–1983 | Wisła Kraków | 304 | (153) |
| 1981–1982 | → Charleroi (loan) | 29 | (13) |
| 1983–1985 | AEL | 64 | (20) |
| 1985–1988 | Stuttgarter Kickers | 81 | (21) |
| 1988–1989 | Offenburger FV | 32 | (8) |
| Total | | 510 | (215) |

International career
| 1972–1980 | Poland | 35 | (8) |

Managerial career
- 1992: Wisła Kraków
- 1996: Wisła Kraków
- 1997: Wisła Kraków
- 1997: AEL
- 2000–2001: Dalin Myślenice
- 2003–2004: Dalin Myślenice
- 2005: Garbarnia Kraków
- 2006: Płomień Jerzmanowice
- 2006–2007: Wisła Kraków (youth)
- 2008: Wisła Kraków (ME)
- 2015–2016: Wisła Kraków (U19)
- 2016–2017: Wisła Kraków (caretaker)
- 2021: Wisła Kraków (caretaker)
Medal record
Men's football
Representing Poland
FIFA World Cup
| Third place | 1974 West Germany |
Olympic Games
| Gold medal – first place | 1972 Munich | Team |
| Silver medal – second place | 1976 Montreal | Team |
- * Club domestic league appearances and goals

Kazimierz Kmiecik (born 19 September 1951) is a Polish former professional footballer who played as a striker, spending most of his career with Wisła Kraków, where he played 304 league matches and scored 153 goals. This makes him the best goalscorer in history of the club. He also played for AEL (1982 to 1985) and won the first Greek cup for the history of the team, in 1985. He is widely regarded a legend at AEL and remains a fan favourite.

He played 35 matches and scored eight goals for the Poland national team. He was a participant at the 1972 Summer Olympics, where Poland won the gold medal, the 1974 FIFA World Cup, where Poland won the bronze medal and 1976 Summer Olympics, where Poland won the silver medal.

Several times, he was the manager of Wisła Kraków, also temporary. On 14 February 2022, he was confirmed as an assistant coach in Wisła, on the day Jerzy Brzęczek was announced as the main manager.

== Career statistics ==
=== International ===
Appearances and goals by national team and year
| National team | Year | Apps | Goals |
|---|---|---|---|
| Poland | 1972 | 2 | 1 |
| Poland | 1973 | 6 | 2 |
| Poland | 1974 | 5 | 0 |
| Poland | 1975 | 3 | 1 |
| Poland | 1976 | 8 | 1 |
| Poland | 1977 | 2 | 1 |
| Poland | 1978 | 0 | 0 |
| Poland | 1979 | 3 | 1 |
| Poland | 1980 | 5 | 1 |
| Total | | 34 | 8 |

== Honours ==
Wisła Kraków

- Ekstraklasa: 1977–78

Larissa

- Greek Cup: 1984–85

Poland

- Olympic gold medal: 1972
- Olympic silver medal: 1976
- FIFA World Cup third place: 1974

Individual

- Ekstraklasa top scorer: 1975–76, 1977–78, 1978–79, 1979–80
- Ekstraklasa Hall of Fame: 2025
