= 1984–85 Alpha Ethniki =

49th season of top-tier football league in Greece

Alpha Ethniki
- Season: 1984–85
- Champions: PAOK; 2nd Greek title
- Relegated: Egaleo; Pierikos
- European Cup: PAOK
- UEFA Cup: Panathinaikos; AEK Athens
- Cup Winners' Cup: AEL
- Matches: 240
- Goals: 663 (2.76 per match)
- Top goalscorer: Thomas Mavros (27 goals)

The 1984–85 Alpha Ethniki was the 49th season of the highest football league of Greece. The season began on 23 September 1984 and ended on 16 June 1985. PAOK won their second Greek title and their first one in nine years.

The point system was: Win: 2 points - Draw: 1 point.

== Teams ==
Promoted from 1983–84 Beta Ethniki	Relegated from 1983–84 Alpha Ethniki
Panachaiki; Pierikos	PAS Giannina; Panserraikos

Location of teams in 1984–85 Alpha Ethniki

== League table ==
Pos	Team	Pld	W	D	L	GF	GA	GD	Pts	Qualification or relegation
1	PAOK (C)	30	19	8	3	54	26	+28	46	Qualification for European Cup first round
2	Panathinaikos	30	17	9	4	61	30	+31	43	Qualification for UEFA Cup first round
3	AEK Athens	30	16	11	3	58	29	+29	43	Qualification for UEFA Cup first round
4	Olympiacos	30	17	8	5	53	23	+30	42	
5	Iraklis	30	19	3	8	59	33	+26	41	
6	AEL	30	14	7	9	55	35	+20	35	Qualification for Cup Winners' Cup first round
7	Aris	30	8	14	8	38	37	+1	30	
8	Panionios	30	9	12	9	34	40	−6	30	
9	Ethnikos Piraeus	30	11	5	14	35	47	−12	27	
10	OFI	30	10	6	14	46	49	−3	26	
11	Apollon Athens	30	9	7	14	30	40	−10	25	
12	Apollon Kalamarias	30	9	6	15	24	38	−14	24	
13	Doxa Drama	30	8	6	16	33	42	−9	22	
14	Panachaiki	30	8	5	17	26	51	−25	21	
15	Egaleo (R)	30	3	7	20	28	66	−38	13	Relegation to Beta Ethniki
16	Pierikos (R)	30	3	6	21	29	77	−48	12	Relegation to Beta Ethniki

Source: RSSSF
Rules for classification: 1st points; 2nd head-to-head points; 3rd head-to-head goal difference; 4th decision match.
(C) Champions; (R) Relegated

== Results ==
Home \ Away	AEK	AEL	APA	APK	ARIS	DOX	EGA	ETH	IRA	OFI	OLY	PNC	PAO	PAN	PAOK	PIE
AEK Athens		3–1	3–0	1–0	3–1	2–0	5–2	4–1	2–1	2–1	1–1	5–1	1–1	1–1	2–2	7–2
AEL	4–1		3–1	3–0	0–0	1–0	3–0	2–0	3–2	2–0	1–1	3–1	1–3	5–0	1–2	5–1
Apollon Athens	1–2	0–1		0–0	2–0	1–0	2–2	2–3	1–2	2–0	0–1	3–0	2–3	0–3	1–3	2–0
Apollon Kalamarias	1–1	1–0	0–1		0–1	1–1	3–0	1–0	1–2	1–0	2–0	1–0	2–5	1–0	0–2	3–0
Aris	0–0	3–3	0–0	0–0		2–1	1–1	3–0	0–0	2–4	0–0	2–2	2–1	2–0	3–0	2–0
Doxa Drama	0–0	2–2	0–1	3–0	1–1		3–2	1–0	0–3	1–2	1–0	2–0	1–1	0–3	2–2	4–0
Egaleo	0–0	2–2	1–1	1–0	1–0	1–2		1–3	2–3	0–2	0–3	1–1	0–2	1–1	1–2	5–1
Ethnikos Piraeus	1–3	0–3	2–1	1–0	2–2	1–0	1–0		1–3	2–1	1–3	3–0	1–0	0–1	1–2	3–1
Iraklis	1–0	1–0	4–2	4–0	4–3	3–1	1–0	2–0		3–1	0–1	2–2	3–2	6–0	0–1	1–0
OFI	1–2	1–1	1–0	1–2	1–1	3–1	4–1	0–0	2–1		1–2	3–1	1–1	4–4	3–1	6–2
Olympiacos	0–1	1–0	1–1	3–1	3–1	3–1	6–0	0–0	3–1	4–1		4–0	0–0	4–2	2–1	3–1
Panachaiki	1–1	1–0	0–1	1–0	0–2	1–0	2–0	1–1	1–2	2–1	3–1		0–2	2–0	0–3	3–0
Panathinaikos	3–2	2–1	4–0	1–1	3–1	2–1	2–0	3–1	2–1	2–0	1–1	3–0		4–1	0–1	2–2
Panionios	0–0	1–1	0–1	2–0	1–1	2–1	4–1	0–0	1–0	1–1	0–0	1–0	1–1		0–0	2–0
PAOK	1–1	4–1	0–0	3–1	2–0	2–0	3–1	5–2	1–1	3–0	1–0	2–0	1–1	1–0		2–1
Pierikos	0–2	1–2	1–1	1–1	2–2	0–3	3–1	2–4	0–2	2–0	0–2	2–0	1–4	2–2	1–1	

Source: RSSSF
Legend: Blue = home team win; Yellow = draw; Red = away team win.

== Top scorers ==
Rank	Player	Club	Goals
1	(Greece) Thomas Mavros	AEK Athens	27
2	(Greece) Nikos Anastopoulos	Olympiacos	15
2	(Greece) Dimitris Saravakos	Panathinaikos	15
2	(Greece) Thalis Tsirimokos	OFI	15
2	(Sweden) Håkan Sandberg	AEK Athens	15
6	(Greece) Christos Yfantidis	Doxa Drama	13
7	(Greece) Christos Dimopoulos	PAOK	12
7	(Poland) Krzysztof Adamczyk	AEL	12
7	(Greece) Kostas Batsinilas	Ethnikos Piraeus	12
10	(Greece) Georgios Skartados	PAOK	11
10	(Greece) Dimitris Mavrikis	Panionios	11
10	(Greece) Vasilis Chardalias	Panachaiki	11

== Attendances ==
Panathinaikos drew the highest average home attendance in the 1984–85 Alpha Ethniki.

#	Team	Average attendance
1	Panathinaikos	37,024
2	Olympiacos	33,596
3	PAOK	22,629
4	AEK Athens	20,652
5	AEL	9,699
6	Panionios	9,538
7	Iraklis	8,854
8	Aris	7,681
9	Panachaiki	7,146
10	Egaleo	5,952
11	Ethnikos Piraeus	5,857
12	OFI	5,205
13	Apollon Kalamarias	4,717
14	Doxa Drama	4,663
15	Pierikos	4,239
16	Apollon Athens	3,883
