= 1979–80 AEK Athens F.C. season =

AEK Athens
1979–80 season
- Chairman: Loukas Barlos
- Manager: Hermann Stessl (until 25 March); Miltos Papapostolou
- Stadium: AEK Stadium
- Alpha Ethniki: 4th
- Greek Cup: Round of 16
- European Cup: First round
- Top goalscorer: League: Dušan Bajević (25); All: Dušan Bajević (28)
- Highest home attendance: 36,100 vs Panathinaikos (7 October 1979)
- Lowest home attendance: 3,279 vs Panetolikos (6 February 1980)
- Average home league attendance: 16,423
- Biggest win: AEK Athens 6–1 Rodos
- Biggest defeat: PAOK 4–0 AEK Athens
Home colours	Away colours

The 1979–80 season was the 56th season in the existence of AEK Athens F.C. and the 21st consecutive season in the top flight of Greek football. They competed in the Alpha Ethniki, the Greek Cup and the European Cup. The season began on 19 September 1979 and finished on 24 May 1980.

== Kits ==
Supplier: Adidas

Home	Away

== Overview ==
The enactment of Law 879/79 in March 1979 led to the full professionalization of Greek football, bringing wealthy businessmen into the spotlight. The Vardinogiannis family took charge of Panathinaikos, with Yiorgos Vardinogiannis serving as president, while a group of shipowners led by Stavros Daifas assumed ownership of Olympiacos. On July 30, AEK Athens were also incorporated as a S.A. under the leadership of Loukas Barlos. Realizing it would be impossible to compete financially with his rivals and opposing the professionalization of sport, Barlos was setting the stage for his departure. His last major contribution to AEK and Greek football, was the construction of the first two-tier stand in a Greek stadium on October 7, when "Skepasti" (the Covered Stand) was inaugurated in Nea Filadelfeia. In terms of transfers, AEK primarily relied on young players that emerged from their renowned academy which was managed by František Fadrhonc. The position of a foreign player which was vacated by the departure of Milton Viera was filled by Franjo Vladić, the long-time teammate of Dušan Bajević at Velež Mostar. Barlos played his "last card" by appointing the manager who won the Austrian championship with Austria Wien, Hermann Stessl.

Τhe draw brought AEK against the Romanian Argeș Pitești for the first round of the European Cup. The draw generated optimism among the team and the supporters of AEK who remembered the triumph against Porto in the previous season's first round. At Stadionul 1 Mai, AEK were reduced to ten men when Damianidis was sent off at the 52nd minute and the Romanians got the victory with a relative safe score of 3–0. Despite the heavy defeat, the circumstances of the match gave AEK reason to remain optimistic about their chances in the rematch. At Nea Filadelfeia, AEK once again faced the task of overturning a defeat in the first leg. At the beginning of the match they showed that they were capable of that as they took the lead at the 13th minute, with an own goal by Ivan and 7 minutes later, Vladić doubled the score. AEK had more than an hour to score a third goal that would equalize the score of the first match. However, they failed to score any further, as the referee, André Daina, denied AEK three clear penalties and the possibility to qualify for the next round. The anger of the players and staff of AEK resulted in incidents in the locker rooms and the referees' room that took place after the end of the match. These incidents led UEFA to impose a one-year ban on AEK from European competitions.

In the first round of the Cup, AEK faced Panachaiki away from home and eliminated them with a 4–3 win after extra time. Afterwards they easily passed through Panetolikos with a 5–1 home win in the second round. In the round of 16 they were eliminated by PAOK losing 1–0 in Thessaloniki.

AEK made a quiet start to the league and fell behind in the standings. The introduction of mid-season transfers brought by the professionalization of football weakened the squad, as Mimis Domazos left for Panathinaikos, Takis Nikoloudis for Olympiacos and Dionysis Tsamis for Korinthos. AEK subsequently recovered considerably, but a series of disappointing results led to Stessl's dismissal in April. The former footballer of AEK, Miltos Papapostolou took over as manager, assisted by the more experienced František Fadrhonc. The team returned to successful results and aided significantly by the 25 goals of Bajević, who emerged as the league's top scorer, finished tied with Panathinaikos in the third place, two points behind joint leaders, Olympiacos and Aris. The ties in the standings necessitated play-off matches to determine both the championship and third place, which carried a place in the UEFA Cup.

The play-off between AEK and Panathinaikos was unusual in several respects. AEK had already been banned from European competitions by UEFA, meaning that Panathinaikos would qualify for the UEFA Cup regardless of the result, but in case AEK won, they would serve their suspension immediately. The officials of Panathinaikos suggested that they did not want the match to take place. Barlos, showing a high sense of honor and having in mind the incident of Olympiacos not showing up in the last season's play-off match against AEK, insisted that the match be played, despite the potential consequences for his club. On May 24, at Karaiskakis Stadium, the crowd witnessed the honesty that defined the club of Barlos, regardless of their eventual 1–0 defeat, which marked the beginning of the club's absence from the UEFA competitions.

== Management team ==
Position	Staff
Manager	(Greece) Miltos Papapostolou
Assistant manager	(Czechoslovakia) František Fadrhonc
Goalkeeping coach	(Greece) Stelios Serafidis
Fitness coach	(Czechoslovakia) František Fadrhonc
Academy director	(Czechoslovakia) František Fadrhonc
Academy manager	(Greece) Stelios Serafidis
Academy manager	(Greece) Giorgos Kefalidis
Head of Medical	(Greece) Lakis Nikolaou

== Players ==
=== Squad information ===
NOTE: The players are the ones that have been announced by the AEK Athens' press release. No edits should be made unless a player arrival or exit is announced. Updated 24 May 1980, 23:59 UTC+3.

Player	Nat.	Position(s)	Date of birth (Age)	Signed	Previous club	Transfer fee	Contract until
Goalkeepers
Nikos Christidis	(Greece)	GK	2 August 1944 (aged 35)	1976	(Greece) Aris	₯1,500,000	1984
Lakis Stergioudas	(Greece)	GK	11 December 1952 (aged 27)	1972	(Greece) Niki Polygyros	₯36,000	1981
Spyros Ikonomopoulos	(Greece)	GK	25 July 1959 (aged 20)	1979	(Greece) AEK Athens U20	—	1984
Defenders
Dimitris Argyros	(Greece)	CB / LB	6 December 1948 (aged 31)	1979	(Greece) Kastoria	₯7,000,000	1984
Lakis Nikolaou (Captain)	(Greece)	CB / RB / ST / RW	17 July 1949 (aged 30)	1971	(Greece) Atromitos	₯600,000	1982
Babis Intzoglou	(Greece)	RB / LB / CB	1 April 1949 (aged 31)	1976	(Greece) Panionios	₯3,000,000	1984
Giannis Mousouris	(Greece)	RB / RM / ST	26 January 1951 (aged 29)	1977	(Greece) AEL	₯2,500,000	1985
Giorgos Kalogeropoulos	(Greece)	LB	14 September 1954 (aged 25)	1979	(Greece) Panionios	Free	1984
Petros Ravousis (Vice-captain)	(Greece)	CB / RB	1 October 1954 (aged 25)	1972	(Greece) Aetos Skydra	Free	1981
Aris Damianidis	(Greece)	CB / RB	2 March 1955 (aged 25)	1977	(Greece) Egaleo	₯3,500,000	1985
Dimitris Kotsos	(Greece)	LB	30 March 1955 (aged 25)	1978	(Greece) Kastoria	Free	1986
Stavros Letsas	(Greece)	RB / RM / CB	6 March 1957 (aged 23)	1979	(Greece) Agioi Anargyroi	Free	1985
Panagiotis Stylianopoulos	(Greece)	RB / LB / RM / DM	4 September 1957 (aged 22)	1978	(Greece) AEK Athens U20	—	1986
Stelios Manolas	(Greece)	RB / CB	13 July 1961 (aged 18)	1980	(Greece) AEK Athens U20	—	1984
Midfielders
Franjo Vladić	(Socialist Federal Republic of Yugoslavia)	AM / RM / LM / SS / CM	19 October 1950 (aged 29)	1979	(Socialist Federal Republic of Yugoslavia) Velež Mostar	Free	1981
Christos Ardizoglou	(Greece) (Israel)	RM / LM / RW / LW / AM / RB / LB	25 March 1953 (aged 27)	1974	(Greece) Apollon Athens	₯12,000,000	1982
Stelios Kaselakis	(Greece)	RM / RB / CM	1954 (aged 25–26)	1979	(Greece) Agioi Anargyroi	₯2,500,000	1984
Spyros Thodis	(Greece)	CM / AM / DM	23 July 1955 (aged 24)	1979	(Greece) Anagennisi Karditsa	₯4,000,000	1984
Christos Kalaitzidis	(Greece)	LM / LW / LB	6 February 1959 (aged 21)	1979	(Greece) AEK Athens U20	—	1984
Vangelis Vlachos	(Greece)	AM / CM / RM / LM	6 January 1962 (aged 18)	1979	(Greece) AEK Athens U20	—	1984
Forwards
Dušan Bajević	(Socialist Federal Republic of Yugoslavia)	ST / SS	10 December 1948 (aged 31)	1977	(Socialist Federal Republic of Yugoslavia) Velež Mostar	Free	1980
Tasos Konstantinou	(Cyprus)	RW / SS / ST / RM / AM	11 March 1951 (aged 29)	1972	(Cyprus) EPA Larnaca	₯600,000	1981
Thomas Mavros	(Greece)	ST / LW	31 May 1954 (aged 26)	1976	(Greece) Panionios	₯10,000,000	1983
Panikos Hatziloizou	(Cyprus)	RW / ST / RM / AM	30 September 1959 (aged 20)	1979	(Cyprus) Aris Limassol	₯3,000,000	1984
Stefanos Zografos	(Greece)	ST	28 April 1960 (aged 20)	1979	(Greece) AEK Athens U20	—	1984
Giorgos Chatziioannidis	(Greece)	ST	1 June 1961 (aged 19)	1979	(Greece) AEK Athens U20	—	1984
Left during Winter Transfer Window
Mimis Domazos	(Greece)	AM / SS	22 January 1942 (aged 38)	1978	(Greece) Panathinaikos	Free	1980
Dionysis Tsamis	(Greece)	CM / DM / AM	17 October 1951 (aged 28)	1972	(Greece) Panetolikos	₯2,350,000	1981
Takis Nikoloudis	(Greece)	CM / AM / RM / LM	26 August 1951 (aged 28)	1976	(Greece) Iraklis	Free	1984

== Transfers ==
=== In ===
==== Summer ====
Pos.	Player	From	Fee	Date	Contract Until	Source
GK	(Greece) Spyros Ikonomopoulos	(Greece) AEK Athens U20	Promotion	1 July 1979	30 June 1984	
DF	(Greece) Dimitris Argyros	(Greece) Kastoria	₯7,000,000	6 August 1979	30 June 1984	
DF	(Greece) Stavros Letsas	(Greece) Agioi Anargyroi	Free transfer	7 August 1979	30 June 1986	
DF	(Greece) Panagiotis Stylianopoulos	(Greece) AEK Athens U20	Promotion	1 July 1979	30 June 1986	
MF	(Greece) Spyros Thodis	(Greece) Anagennisi Karditsa	₯4,000,000	7 August 1979	30 June 1984	
MF	(Greece) Christos Kalaitzidis	(Greece) AEK Athens U20	Promotion	1 July 1979	30 June 1984	
MF	(Greece) Stelios Kaselakis	(Greece) Agioi Anargyroi	₯2,500,000	7 August 1979	30 June 1984	
MF	(Socialist Federal Republic of Yugoslavia) Franjo Vladić	(Socialist Federal Republic of Yugoslavia) Velež Mostar	Free transfer	28 June 1979	30 June 1981	
MF	(Greece) Vangelis Vlachos	(Greece) AEK Athens U20	Promotion	6 July 1979	30 June 1984	
FW	(Cyprus) Panikos Hatziloizou	(Cyprus) Aris Limassol	₯3,000,000	16 August 1979	30 June 1984	
FW	(Greece) Stefanos Zografos	(Greece) AEK Athens U20	Promotion	6 July 1979	30 June 1984	
FW	(Greece) Giorgos Chatziioannidis	(Greece) AEK Athens U20	Promotion	6 July 1979	30 November 1984	
FW	(Greece) Thomas Stafylas	(Greece) AEK Athens U20	Promotion	1 July 1979	30 June 1984	

==== Winter ====
Pos.	Player	From	Fee	Date	Contract Until	Source
DF	(Greece) Stelios Manolas	(Greece) AEK Athens U20	Promotion	2 January 1980	30 November 1984	
DF	(Greece) Giorgos Kalogeropoulos	(Greece) Panionios	Free transfer	11 December 1979	30 November 1984	

=== Out ===
==== Summer ====
Pos.	Player	To	Fee	Date	Source
DF	(Greece) Apostolos Toskas	(Greece) Atromitos	Free transfer	2 August 1979	
DF	(Greece) Theodoros Apostolopoulos	(Greece) Apollon Athens	Contract termniation	17 August 1979	
MF	(Uruguay) Milton Viera	Retired		6 July 1979	
MF	(Greece) Lazaros Papadopoulos	(Greece) Rodos	Free transfer	15 August 1979	
FW	(Greece) Dimitris Kokkinopoulos	(Greece) Acharnaikos	Contract termniation	16 August 1979	
FW	(Greece) Mimis Papaioannou	(Australia) Western Suburbs	Free transfer	1 July 1979	

==== Winter ====
Pos.	Player	To	Fee	Date	Source
MF	(Greece) Takis Nikoloudis	(Greece) Olympiacos	₯6,500,000	1 December 1979	
MF	(Greece) Mimis Domazos	(Greece) Panathinaikos	Contract termination	24 December 1979	

=== Loan out ===
==== Summer ====
Pos.	Player	To	Fee	Date	Until	Option to buy	Source
MF	(Greece) Giorgos Vlantis	(Greece) Panachaiki	Free	4 August 1979	30 June 1980	✗	
FW	(Greece) Thomas Stafylas	(Greece) Acharnaikos	Free	16 August 1979	30 June 1980	✗	

==== Winter ====
Pos.	Player	To	Fee	Date	Until	Option to buy	Source
MF	(Greece) Dionysis Tsamis	(Greece) Korinthos	Free	13 December 1979	30 November 1980	✓	

=== Contract renewals ===
Pos.	Player	Date	Former Exp. Date	New Exp. Date	Source
DF	(Greece) Lakis Nikolaou	4 August 1979	30 June 1979	30 June 1982	
MF	(Greece) Mimis Domazos	1 July 1979	30 June 1979	30 June 1980	

=== Overall transfer activity ===
==== Expenditure ====
Summer: ▼ ₯16,500,000

Winter: ▼ ₯0

Total: ▼ ₯16,500,000

==== Income ====
Summer: ▲ ₯0

Winter: ▲ ₯6,500,000

Total: ▲ ₯6,500,000

==== Net Totals ====
Summer: ▼ ₯16,500,000

Winter: ▲ ₯6,500,000

Total: ▼ ₯10,000,000

== Pre-season and friendlies ==
1 August 1979 Friendly	AEK Athens	2–1	Kapfenberger SV	Nea Filadelfeia
21:00 EEST (UTC+3)	Ravousis 53' (pen.); Ardizoglou 62'	Report	Savanović 2'	Stadium: AEK Stadium; Attendance: 11,816; Referee: Stelios Marinelis (Athens)

6 August 1979 Friendly	AEK Athens	1–1	Apollon Athens	Nea Filadelfeia
21:00 EEST (UTC+3)	Nikoloudis 10'	Report	Karypidis 65'	Stadium: AEK Stadium; Attendance: 8,000; Referee: Makis Germanakos (Athens)

8 August 1979 Friendly	AEK Athens	5–5	Velež Mostar	Nea Filadelfeia
21:00 EEST (UTC+3)	Bajević 2', 43', 90'; Ravousis 25' (pen.); Nikoloudis 63'	Report	Okuka 20', 30'; Halilhodžić 27', 57' (pen.); Jakirević 55'	Stadium: AEK Stadium; Attendance: 15,702; Referee: Papandreou
Note: Friendly match as part of the transfer of Franjo Vladić.

12 August 1979 Friendly	Victoria XI	4–0	AEK Athens	Melbourne
	Cole 34', 82', 88'; Gilder 55'	Report		Stadium: Olympic Park Stadium; Attendance: 15,107; Referee: Chris Bambridge (Australia)

15 August 1979 Friendly	South Australia XI	0–1	AEK Athens	Hindmarsh
02:00 EEST (UTC+3)		Report	Intzoglou (red card) 15'; Ardizoglou 20'	Stadium: Hindmarsh Stadium; Attendance: 12,000; Referee: John Tarling (Australia)

19 August 1979 Friendly	New South Wales XI	5–5	AEK Athens	Sydney
08:00 EEST (UTC+3)	Raskopoulos 1'; Krncevic 12', 37'; Beggs 76', 86'	Report	Intzoglou 14'; Bajević 15' (pen.), 90'; Vladić 31'; Ardizoglou 56'	Stadium: Sydney Sports Ground; Attendance: 14,626; Referee: Henry Witschge (Australia)

22 August 1979 Friendly	Alexander The Great	1–3	AEK Athens	Melbourne
15:00 EEST (UTC+3)	Cole 58'	Report	Bajević 63' (pen.), 66'; Vladić 70'	Stadium: Olympic Park Stadium; Attendance: 8,000; Referee: Nick Karlich (Austria)

29 August 1979 Friendly	AEK Athens	1–1	OFI	Nea Filadelfeia
21:00 EEST (UTC+3)	Mavros 24'	Report	Koncilia 27'	Stadium: AEK Stadium; Attendance: 13,391; Referee: Alexopoulos (Athens)

1 September 1979 Friendly	AEK Athens	21–0	Palia Kokkinia	Nea Filadelfeia
17:00 EEST (UTC+3)	Chatziioannidis; Thodis; Kaselakis; Vlachos; Thanopoulos; Konstantinou; Stylianopoulos; Zografos; Papachatzakis	Report		Stadium: AEK Stadium

2 September 1979 Friendly	PAOK	3–2	AEK Athens	Thessaloniki
20:00 EEST (UTC+3)	Vasilakos 50', 65'; Damanakis 85'	Report	Ardizoglou 33', 67'; Vladić (yellow card) 81'	Stadium: Toumba Stadium; Attendance: 15,826; Referee: Abatzis (Thessaloniki)

5 September 1979 Friendly	AEK Athens	3–1	Zürich	Nea Filadelfeia
21:00 EEST (UTC+3)	Bajević 1'; Mavros 6'; Kalaitzidis 85'	Report	Botteron 22'	Stadium: AEK Stadium; Attendance: 15,644; Referee: Chiotakis (Piraeus)

6 September 1979 Friendly	AEK Athens	6–1	Ionikos	Nea Filadelfeia
17:30 EEST (UTC+3)	Stylianopoulos (yellow card); Kaselakis 33'; Chatziioannidis 35', 55', 83', 84'; Zografos 39'; Kalaitzidis 85'	Report	Piperias 77'	Stadium: AEK Stadium; Attendance: 2,000; Referee: Giorgos Voulgaris (Athens)

9 September 1979 Friendly	AEK Athens	4–0	PAS Giannina	Nea Filadelfeia
20:30 EEST (UTC+3)	Kalaitzidis 12'; Chatziioannidis 17', 18', 50'	Report		Stadium: AEK Stadium; Attendance: 6,658; Referee: Kapeliaris
Note: The referees that were appointed did not show up, thus the officials called for referees who were in the stands and eventually found three.

14 September 1979 Friendly	AEK Athens	4–1	Panachaiki	Nea Filadelfeia
21:00 EEST (UTC+3)	Bajević 3', (yellow card) 53'; Mavros 40'; Ardizoglou 48', 66'	Report	Apostolidis 35'	Stadium: AEK Stadium; Attendance: 9,000; Referee: Nikos Zlatanos (Thessaloniki)

23 September 1979 Friendly	AEK Athens	2–0	Iraklis	Nea Filadelfeia
17:15 EEST (UTC+3)	Bajević 20', 89'	Report		Stadium: AEK Stadium; Attendance: 7,000; Referee: Stelios Marinelis (Athens)

27 September 1979 Friendly	AEK Athens	6–2	AO Petralona	Nea Filadelfeia
	Hatziloizou 10', 49'; Konstantinou 15'; Kaselakis 78'; Chatziioannidis 35', 88'	Report	Kontothanasis 39'; Theodosopoulos 59' (pen.)	Stadium: AEK Stadium; Referee: Stelios Serafidis

17 October 1979 Friendly	Anagennisi Karditsa	2–0	AEK Athens	Karditsa
	Lappas 25'; Petsas 70'	Report		Stadium: Municipal Stadium of Karditsa; Attendance: 2,000; Referee: Arvanitis
Note: Friendly match as part of the transfer of Spyros Thodis.

31 October 1979 Friendly	AEK Athens	6–2	Acharnaikos	Nea Filadelfeia
15:00 EET (UTC+2)	Thodis 15'; Bajević 22' (pen.), 32', 80' (pen.), 87'; Mavros 74'	Report	Stafylas 26', 62'	Stadium: AEK Stadium; Attendance: 1,000; Referee: Giorgos Voulgaris (Athens)

1 November 1979 Friendly	AEK Athens	14–1	AO Moschato	Nea Filadelfeia
15:00 EET (UTC+2)	Hatziloizou 7', 14', 72'; Kaselakis 17', 20', 81'; Chatziioannidis 24', 30'; Ardizoglou 32', 34', 36', 66'; Nikoloudis 67'; Nikolaou 73' (pen.)	Report	Valvis 49'	Stadium: AEK Stadium; Attendance: 1,000

8 November 1979 Friendly	AEK Athens	5–0	Drapetsona	Nea Filadelfeia
15:00 EET (UTC+2)	Thodis 1'; Bajević 11'; Konstantinou 35'; Chatziioannidis 49'; Nikoloudis 72'	Report		Stadium: AEK Stadium; Referee: Alexopoulos (Athens)

14 November 1979 Friendly	Acharnaikos	2–1	AEK Athens	Acharnes
	Theofilis 59'; Nikas 71'	Report	Chatziioannidis 12'	Stadium: Acharnes Stadium; Referee: Filopoulos

29 November 1979 Friendly	AEK Athens	10–2	AO Charavgi	Nea Filadelfeia
14:00 EET (UTC+2)	Kaselakis 14', 54', 69'; Vlachos 34', 52', 68', 86'; Hatziloizou 63'; Chatziioannidis 70' (pen.), 73'	Report	Kostidis 38'; Manis 67'	Stadium: AEK Stadium; Referee: Stelios Serafidis

5 December 1979 Friendly	Niki Volos	2–0	AEK Athens	Volos
14:30 EET (UTC+2)	Malakos 31'; Zigiridis 71'	Report		Stadium: Pantelis Magoulas Stadium; Referee: Archontis

13 December 1979 Friendly	AEK Athens	1–1	Egaleo	Nea Filadelfeia
13:30 EET (UTC+2)	Konstantinou 90'	Report	Nikolaou 86' (o.g.)	Stadium: AEK Stadium; Referee: Stelios Serafidis

30 January 1980 Friendly	AEK Athens	6–1	Ethnikos Asteras	Nea Filadelfeia
14:00 EET (UTC+2)	Chatziioannidis 10', 12', 61'; Paraprastanitis 47'; Kaselakis 54'; Stylianopoulos 56'	Report	Georgaras 69'	Stadium: AEK Stadium; Referee: Stelios Serafidis
Note: The referee was the academy manager of AEK, Stelios Serafidis who was replaced at the 30th minute by the official of AEK, Alafogiannis.

4 February 1980 Friendly	AEK Athens	18–2	Roxon Park	Nea Filadelfeia
15:35 EET (UTC+2)	Hatziloizou 3', 40', 56', 78'; Chatziioannidis (penalty missed) 13', 15', 34', 46', 53', 62', 65'; Thodis 22'; Kalaitzidis 33', 48', 75', 77'; Kaselakis 36'; Manolas 47'; Georgamlis 66'	Report	Goal	Stadium: AEK Stadium; Attendance: 56; Referee: Leonidas Printezis (Athens)
Note: The match began with a 35-minute delay due to the late arrival of the referees. In fact one of the assistant referees was the academy manager of AEK, Stelios Serafidis who was replaced by the original assistant referee, when he arrived 25 minutes after the start of the match.

16 April 1980 Friendly	AEK Athens	2–2	Wolves	Nea Filadelfeia
20:00 EEST (UTC+3)	Vlachos 55'; Kaselakis 62'	Report	Gray 34', 55'	Stadium: AEK Stadium; Attendance: 9,187; Referee: Manolis Platopoulos (Athens)
Note: The main goalkeeper of Wolves was injured during the morning training and thus Colin Brazier took his place under the posts.

23 April 1980 Friendly	Panelefsiniakos	3–2	AEK Athens	Elefsina
17:00 EEST (UTC+3)	Gavogiannakis 8'; Tsolakidis 37'; Matthaiou 79'	Report	Georgamlis 43'; Chatziioannidis 85'	Stadium: Municipal Stadium of Elefsina; Attendance: 1,500; Referee: Thomaidis (Piraeus)

7 May 1980 Friendly	AEK Athens	1–3	Greece U19	Nea Filadelfeia
17:00 EET (UTC+2)	Konstantinou 76' (pen.)	Report	Sofianos 37'; Vlachos 67'; Chatziantoniou 85'	Stadium: AEK Stadium; Attendance: 379; Referee: Alekos Sofianidis
Note: Manolas and Vlachos who were in the squad of Greece U19, competed against AEK.

21 May 1980 Friendly	AEK Athens	2–1	Fulham	Nea Filadelfeia
17:30 EEST (UTC+3)	Intzoglou 48'; Chatziioannidis 59'	Report	Mason 89'	Stadium: AEK Stadium; Attendance: 1,012; Referee: Giorgos Ballis (Athens)

28 May 1980 Friendly	AEK Athens	4–3	Odigitria Piraeus	Nea Filadelfeia
	Kaselakis 22', 66', 80'; Margaritopoulos 65'	Report	Efmorfopoulos 10'; Melas 29' (pen.); Drakonalis 60'	Stadium: AEK Stadium; Attendance: 1,200; Referee: Synodinos

30 May 1980 Friendly	AEK Athens	4–2	Panthisiakos	Nea Filadelfeia
	Chatziioannidis 15'; Zografos 55'; 60'; 70'	Report	Keretzis 44' (pen.); Soldatos 80'	Stadium: AEK Stadium; Referee: Stelios Manolas

4 June 1980 Friendly	Agioi Anargyroi	2–3	AEK Athens	Agioi Anargyroi
17:30 EEST (UTC+3)	Letsas 65'; Bellis 85'	Report	Georgamlis (penalty missed) 20'; Papachatzakis 30' (pen.); 75'; 89'	Stadium: Agioi Anargyroi Municipal Stadium; Referee: Makroglou
Note: Kaselakis and Letsas competed with their former club, Agioi Anargyroi against AEK.

5 June 1980 Friendly	AEK Athens	6–3	Prasina Poulia	Moschato
17:30 EEST (UTC+3)	Letsas 25', 35'; Thanopoulos 65'; Georgamlis 75'; Vlachos 77'; Papachatzakis 82'	Report	Paliaros 42', 55'; Tsolis 56'	Stadium: Municipal Stadium of Moschato; Referee: Vasilis Potoglou (Piraeus)

== Competitions ==
=== Overall record ===
Competition	First match	Last match	Starting round	Final position	Record							
Competition	First match	Last match	Starting round	Final position	Pld	W	D	L	GF	GA	GD	Win %
Alpha Ethniki	30 September 1979	18 May 1980	Matchday 1	4th	34	18	9	7	64	39	+25	52.94
3rd place play-off	24 May 1980		Final	Runners-up	1	0	0	1	0	1	−1	0.00
Greek Cup	21 November 1979	20 February 1980	First round	Round of 16	3	2	0	1	9	5	+4	66.67
European Cup	19 September 1979	8 October 1980	First round	First round	2	1	0	1	2	3	−1	50.00
Total					40	21	9	10	75	48	+27	52.50

Last updated: 24 May 1980
Source: Competitions

=== Alpha Ethniki ===
==== League table ====
Pos	Team	Pld	W	D	L	GF	GA	GD	Pts	Qualification or relegation
2	Aris	34	19	9	6	46	20	+26	47 (Note: Championship play-off: Olympiacos–Aris 2–0)	Qualification for UEFA Cup first round
3	Panathinaikos	34	15	15	4	38	24	+14	45 (Note: 3rd-place play-off: Panathinaikos–AEK Athens 1–0)	Qualification for UEFA Cup first round
4	AEK Athens	34	18	9	7	64	39	+25	45	
5	PAOK	34	17	7	10	53	33	+20	41	
6	PAS Giannina	34	14	9	11	50	44	+6	37	

Source: RSSSF
Rules for classification: 1st points; 2nd decision match; 3rd head-to-head goal difference.

==== Results summary ====
Overall								Home						Away					
Pld	W	D	L	GF	GA	GD	Pts	W	D	L	GF	GA	GD	W	D	L	GF	GA	GD
34	18	9	7	64	39	+25	45	12	3	2	44	20	+24	6	6	5	20	19	+1

Source: Competitive matches

==== Results by Matchday ====
Round	1	2	3	4	5	6	7	8	9	10	11	12	13	14	15	16	17	18	19	20	21	22	23	24	25	26	27	28	29	30	31	32	33	34
Ground	A	H	A	A	H	A	A	H	A	H	A	H	A	H	H	A	H	H	A	H	H	A	H	H	A	H	A	H	A	H	A	A	H	A
Result	W	L	L	D	W	L	W	W	W	W	D	L	W	D	W	L	W	W	L	W	W	D	D	W	D	D	L	W	D	W	D	W	W	W
Position	3	14	14	13	9	13	8	7	7	5	5	7	6	4	4	6	5	5	6	5	5	5	6	5	5	5	6	5	5	4	4	4	4	4

Source: Competitive matches
A = Away; H = Home; W = Win; D = Draw; L = Loss; P = Postponed

==== Matches ====
30 September 1979 1	Rodos	0–2	AEK Athens	Ialysos
15:30 EEST (UTC+3)			Damianidis (yellow card); Mavros 48'; Nikoloudis 55'	Stadium: Municipal Stadium Ekonomideio; Attendance: 3,800; Referee: Nikos Zlatanos (Thessaloniki)

7 October 1979 2	AEK Athens	0–1	Panathinaikos	Nea Filadelfeia
15:30 EEST (UTC+3)	Intzoglou (red card) 88'		Kirisits (yellow card) 20'; Oré 79'	Stadium: AEK Stadium; Attendance: 36,100; Referee: Makis Germanakos (Athens)
Note: Official inauguration for the new high-raised gate, "Skepasti" of the stadium with capacity of 8,000 spectators.

14 October 1979 3	PAOK	4–0	AEK Athens	Thessaloniki
15:30 EEST (UTC+3)	Guerino 9', 37'; Orfanos 68'; Vasilakos 76'		Nikolaou (yellow card) 61'	Stadium: Kaftanzoglio Stadium; Attendance: 24,082; Referee: Dimitris Pantzalis (Piraeus)

21 October 1979 4	OFI	0–0	AEK Athens	Heraklion
15:00 EEST (UTC+3)			Chatziioannidis (yellow card)	Stadium: Martineno Stadium; Attendance: 5,500; Referee: Apostolos Karavasilis (Larissa)

4 November 1979 5	AEK Athens	4–2	Kastoria	Nea Filadelfeia
15:00 EET (UTC+2)	Bajević 3', 23' (pen.), 39' (pen.); Mavros 37'		Alexiadis (yellow card) 55'; Chounouzidis 85'; Papavasiliou 88' (pen.)	Stadium: AEK Stadium; Attendance: 5,902; Referee: Vasilis Vourakis (Piraeus)

11 November 1979 6	PAS Giannina	3–2	AEK Athens	Ioannina
15:00 EET (UTC+2)	Alexakis (yellow card); Glasmanis 13'; Seitaridis 31', (yellow card); Kontogeorgakis 38'		Papageorgiou 57' (og.); Bajević 72'	Stadium: Zosimades Stadium; Attendance: 6,273; Referee: Giorgos Koukoulakis (Heraklion)

18 November 1979 7	Korinthos	0–1	AEK Athens	Corinth
15:00 EET (UTC+2)			Bajević 15'	Stadium: Korinthos Stadium; Attendance: 13,180; Referee: Manolis Vardakas (Kozani)

25 November 1979 8	AEK Athens	5–2	Panionios	Nea Filadelfeia
14:30 EET (UTC+2)	Mavros 4', 74'; Ardizoglou 54'; Mousouris 61'; Bajević 69'		Chandrakis 20'; Núñez 64'	Stadium: AEK Stadium; Attendance: 16,889; Referee: Giorgos Voulgaris (Athens)

2 December 1979 9	Panachaiki	1–3	AEK Athens	Patras
14:30 EET (UTC+2)	Karamanlis (yellow card) 12'; Moulatsiotis (red card) 15'; Spentzopoulos (yellow card) 15'; Ioakeimidis (penalty missed) 36'; Apostolidis (yellow card) 40', (goal) 66'		Bajević 12' (pen.), 37', 83'; Damianidis (yellow card) 36'	Stadium: Panachaiki Stadium; Attendance: 10,267; Referee: Ioannis Ioannidis (Thessaloniki)

9 January 1980 10	AEK Athens	1–0	Iraklis	Nea Filadelfeia
14:30 EET (UTC+2)	Intzoglou (yellow card) 8'; Ardizoglou 63'		Mavrodoulakis (yellow card) 26'	Stadium: AEK Stadium; Attendance: 11,364; Referee: Giorgos Kounalakis (Heraklion)
Note: The matchday was originally scheduled for 9 December, but was postponed due to a strike called by the first and second division clubs.

16 December 1979 11	Apollon Athens	0–0	AEK Athens	Rizoupoli
14:30 EET (UTC+2)	Vlachos (yellow card)		Prokovas (yellow card); Vrettos (yellow card)	Stadium: Rizoupoli Stadium; Attendance: 9,857; Referee: Kostas Levogiannis (Athens)

23 December 1979 12	AEK Athens	0–1	Olympiacos	Nea Filadelfeia
14:30 EET (UTC+2)			Papadopoulos (yellow card) 14'; Kokolakis 27'	Stadium: AEK Stadium; Attendance: 32,888; Referee: Dimitris Tsolakis (Serres)

26 December 1979 13	Kavala	2–4	AEK Athens	Kavala
14:30 EET (UTC+2)	Triantafyllidis 70' (pen.); Kapetanidis 74'		Vlachos 35', 47'; Mavros 53', 55'	Stadium: Kavala National Stadium; Attendance: 6,241; Referee: Vasilis Patarakis (Piraeus)
Note: Vangelis Vlachos made a record at the time for the youngest scorer in the history of AEK, as he scored at the age of 17 years, 11 months and 20 days.

30 December 1979 14	AEK Athens	1–1	Aris	Nea Filadelfeia
14:30 EET (UTC+2)	Bajević 42'; Ravousis (yellow card) 50'		Drampis 20'	Stadium: AEK Stadium; Attendance: 20,004; Referee: Kostas Dedes (Messinia)

6 January 1980 15	AEK Athens	4–2	AEL	Nea Filadelfeia
14:30 EET (UTC+2)	Intzoglou 8', (yellow card) 53'; Bajević 18', 52', (penalty missed) 34'; Konstantinou 47'		Mousouris 43' (o.g.); Valaoras 50'	Stadium: AEK Stadium; Attendance: 9,348; Referee: Kosmas Iordanidis (Thessaloniki)

13 January 1980 16	Ethnikos Piraeus	2–1	AEK Athens	Piraeus
14:30 EET (UTC+2)	Vamvakousis (yellow card); Karaiskos 26' (pen.), (yellow card); Diamantopoulos 49'		Stergioudas (yellow card); Mavros (yellow card); Bajević 34' (pen.)	Stadium: Karaiskakis Stadium; Attendance: 16,196; Referee: Vasilis Tikmoglou (Thessaloniki)

20 January 1980 17	AEK Athens	2–0	Doxa Drama	Nea Filadelfeia
14:30 EET (UTC+2)	Mavros 65'; Bajević 84'			Stadium: AEK Stadium; Attendance: 10,146; Referee: Theoklis Kontzalis (Thessaloniki)

5 October 1980 18	AEK Athens	6–1	Rodos	Nea Filadelfeia
15:30 EEST (UTC+3)	Bajević 24', 51'; Mavros 44', 53'; Vladić 76', 77'		Tanidis (yellow card) 73'; Kottis 86'	Stadium: AEK Stadium; Attendance: 12,336; Referee: Giannis Angelidis (Serres)

3 February 1980 19	Panathinaikos	1–0	AEK Athens	Ampelokipoi
15:00 EET (UTC+2)	Kouropoulos (yellow card); Tsirigotis (yellow card); Yfantidis 56'		Intzoglou (yellow card); Vladić (yellow card)	Stadium: Leoforos Alexandras Stadium; Attendance: 23,200; Referee: Dimitris Sidiropoulos (Thessaloniki)

10 February 1980 20	AEK Athens	3–1	PAOK	Nea Filadelfeia
15:00 EET (UTC+2)	Vlachos 10'; Bajević 28'; Nikolaou (yellow card) 30'; Ardizoglou 70'		Koudas (yellow card) 25'; Pellios (yellow card) 25'; Guerino 41'	Stadium: AEK Stadium; Attendance: 26,949; Referee: Giorgos Kyfonidis (Kavala)

17 February 1980 21	AEK Athens	2–1	OFI	Nea Filadelfeia
15:00 EET (UTC+2)	Mavros 23', 57'; Ardizoglou (red card) 41'		Tsagarakis (yellow card) 16'; G. Vlachos 36'	Stadium: AEK Stadium; Attendance: 15,521; Referee: Panagiotis Tsolakidis (Thessaloniki)

24 February 1980 22	Kastoria	1–1	AEK Athens	Kastoria
15:00 EET (UTC+2)	Paraschos (yellow card); Siantsis (yellow card); Tsironis 2', (yellow card)		Kalaitzidis (yellow card); Nikolaou 59'	Stadium: Municipal Stadium of Kastoria; Attendance: 3,797; Referee: Vasilis Vourakis (Piraeus)

2 March 1980 23	AEK Athens	1–1	PAS Giannina	Nea Filadelfeia
15:00 EET (UTC+2)	Bajević (penalty missed) 17'; Nikolaou (yellow card) 76', (goal) 84'		Sofias (yellow card) 56', (goal) 73'; Papageorgiou (yellow card) 70'; Seitaridis (yellow card) 77'	Stadium: AEK Stadium; Attendance: 14,678; Referee: Antonis Patrikas (Euboea)

9 March 1980 24	AEK Athens	5–1	Korinthos	Nea Filadelfeia
15:30 EET (UTC+2)	Bajević 20', 38'; Chatziioannidis 60', 75'; Thodis 64'		Giannakoulas (yellow card) 17'; Tzigitzelas (yellow card) 39'; Pissas 89' (pen.)	Stadium: AEK Stadium; Attendance: 7,653; Referee: Vasilis Tikmoglou (Thessaloniki)

16 March 1980 25	Panionios	0–0	AEK Athens	Nea Smyrni
15:30 EET (UTC+2)				Stadium: Nea Smyrni Stadium; Attendance: 10,892; Referee: Stelios Marinelis (Athens)

23 March 1980 26	AEK Athens	2–2	Panachaiki	Nea Filadelfeia
15:30 EET (UTC+2)	Ardizoglou 38', 64', (yellow card) 43'; Thodis (yellow card) 81'		Spentzopoulos 40'; Papalamprou (yellow card) 49'; Davourlis 82'	Stadium: AEK Stadium; Attendance: 18,413; Referee: Theoklis Kontzalis (Thessaloniki)

30 March 1980 27	Iraklis	3–0	AEK Athens	Thessaloniki
15:30 EEST (UTC+3)	Orfanidis 13'; Chatzieleftheriou 33', 82'			Stadium: Kaftanzoglio Stadium; Attendance: 20,398; Referee: Nikos Lagogiannis (Piraeus)

6 April 1980 28	AEK Athens	2–1	Apollon Athens	Nea Filadelfeia
17:00 EEST (UTC+3)	Mavros 22'; Bajević 39' (pen.)		Mavromatis 44'	Stadium: AEK Stadium; Attendance: 15,572; Referee: Manolis Platopoulos (Athens)

13 April 1980 29	Olympiacos	0–0	AEK Athens	Chalcis
17:00 EEST (UTC+3)	Ravousis (yellow card) 10'; Intzoglou (yellow card) 28'		Kaltsas (yellow card) 29'	Stadium: Municipal Stadium of Chalkida; Attendance: 14,500; Referee: Kosmas Iordanidis (Serres)
Note: Match held at Chalcis because Olympiacos had a stadium ban due to incidents in the league match against Apollon Athens. The game was also marked by incidents caused by Olympiacos' fans.

20 April 1980 30	AEK Athens	4–2	Kavala	Nea Filadelfeia
17:00 EEST (UTC+3)	Bajević 19', 28', 53'; Ardizoglou 22'		Kontogeorgiou 8'; Lemonidis 42'; Triantafyllidis (penalty missed) 56'; Filippidis (yellow card) 59'	Stadium: AEK Stadium; Attendance: 10,247; Referee: Vasilis Patarakis (Piraeus)

27 April 1980 31	Aris	0–0	AEK Athens	Thessaloniki
17:00 EEST (UTC+3)	Kouis (yellow card) 60'		Damianidis (yellow card) 62'	Stadium: Aris Stadium; Attendance: 17,020; Referee: Kostas Dedes (Messinia)

4 May 1980 32	AEL	1–3	AEK Athens	Larissa
17:00 EEST (UTC+3)	Golantas 50'; Parafestas (yellow card) 80'		Vladić 18'; Ardizoglou 32'; Thodis (yellow card) 40'; Intzoglou (yellow card) 41'; Nikolaou 85'	Stadium: Alcazar Stadium; Attendance: 10,560; Referee: Vasilis Messalas (Patras)

11 May 1980 33	AEK Athens	2–1	Ethnikos Piraeus	Nea Filadelfeia
17:00 EEST (UTC+3)	Mavros 14', 38', (yellow card) 49'		Lambrinos 43'; Vamvakousis (yellow card) 49'; Stamatakis (yellow card) 64'	Stadium: AEK Stadium; Attendance: 15,185; Referee: Giorgos Loutridis (Larissa)

18 May 1980 34	Doxa Drama	1–3	AEK Athens	Drama
17:00 EEST (UTC+3)	Strantzalis 41'; Mertzanakis (yellow card) 49'		Bajević 56', 64'; Konstantinou 81'	Stadium: Doxa Drama Stadium; Attendance: 5,728; Referee: Dimitris Pantzalis (Piraeus)

==== Third place play-off ====
24 May 1980 Play-off match	Panathinaikos	1–0	AEK Athens	Piraeus
21:00 EEST (UTC+3)	Oré 61'	Report		Stadium: Karaiskakis Stadium; Attendance: 18,350; Referee: Giorgos Ballis (Athens)

=== Greek Cup ===
==== Matches ====
21 November 1979 First round	Panachaiki	3–4 (a.e.t.)	AEK Athens	Patras
14:00 EET (UTC+2)	Ravousis 23' (o.g.); Georgopoulos (yellow card) 26'; Spentzopoulos 40'; Apostolidis 65'; Papagiannopoulos (yellow card) 111'; Davourlis (yellow card) 116'		Mavros 8', 55', 75'; Ravousis (yellow card) 60'; Konstantinou 94'; Damianidis (yellow card) 95'	Stadium: Panachaiki Stadium; Attendance: 6,617; Referee: Vangelis Giannakoudakis (Piraeus)

6 February 1980 Second round	AEK Athens	5–1	Panetolikos	Nea Filadelfeia
14:30 EET (UTC+2)	Kalaitzidis 2'; Bajević 14', 17'; Mavros 37', 65'; Kalogeropoulos (yellow card) 80'		Gakis 30' (pen.)	Stadium: AEK Stadium; Attendance: 3,279; Referee: Giorgos Moschopoulos (Thessaloniki)

20 February 1980 Round of 16	PAOK	1–0	AEK Athens	Thessaloniki
14:30 EET (UTC+2)	Guerino 9'	Report		Stadium: Toumba Stadium; Attendance: 28,151; Referee: Pantelis Argyriou (Dodecanese)

=== European Cup ===
==== First round ====
19 September 1979 First leg	Argeș Pitești (Romania)	3–0	(Greece) AEK Athens	Pitești, Romania
16:45 EEST (UTC+3)	Barbulescu (yellow card) 35'; Nicolae 49', 80'; Radu 65'	Report	Intzoglou (yellow card) 25'; Ardizoglou (yellow card) 35'; Damianidis (red card) 52'	Stadium: Stadionul 1 Mai; Attendance: 20,000; Referee: Enzo Barbaresco (Italy)

8 October 1980 Second leg	AEK Athens (Greece)	2–0 (2–3 agg.)	(Romania) Argeș Pitești	Athens, Greece
16:00 EEST (UTC+3)	Intzoglou (yellow card) 6'; Ivan 12' (o.g.); Vladić 20'	Report	Carstea (yellow card) 19'; Barbulescu (yellow card) 23'; Chivescu (yellow card) 72'	Stadium: AEK Stadium; Attendance: 25,000; Referee: André Daina (Switzerland)
Note: The refereeing of Daina provoked the fans of AEK who made incidents. As a result, AEK were punished by UEFA with a 12-month exclusion from the European Cups.

== Statistics ==
=== Squad statistics ===
As of 24 May 1980

No.	Pos	Player	Alpha Ethniki		Greek Cup		European Cup		Total	
No.	Pos	Player	Apps	Goals	Apps	Goals	Apps	Goals	Apps	Goals
Goalkeepers
—	GK	(Greece) Nikos Christidis	8	0	2	0	0	0	10	0
—	GK	(Greece) Lakis Stergioudas	19	0	1	0	2	0	22	0
—	GK	(Greece) Spyros Ikonomopoulos	8	0	0	0	0	0	8	0
Defenders
—	DF	(Greece) Dimitris Argyros	7	0	0	0	1	0	8	0
—	DF	(Greece) Lakis Nikolaou	22	3	2	0	2	0	26	3
—	DF	(Greece) Babis Intzoglou	22	1	2	0	2	0	26	1
—	DF	(Greece) Giannis Mousouris	35	1	2	0	1	0	38	1
—	DF	(Greece) Giorgos Kalogeropoulos	6	0	1	0	0	0	7	0
—	DF	(Greece) Petros Ravousis	34	0	3	0	2	0	39	0
—	DF	(Greece) Aris Damianidis	21	0	1	0	1	0	23	0
—	DF	(Greece) Dimitris Kotsos	0	0	0	0	0	0	0	0
—	DF	(Greece) Stavros Letsas	0	0	0	0	0	0	0	0
—	DF	(Greece) Panagiotis Stylianopoulos	3	0	1	0	0	0	4	0
—	DF	(Greece) Stelios Manolas	3	0	0	0	0	0	3	0
Midfielders
—	MF	(Socialist Federal Republic of Yugoslavia) Franjo Vladić	28	3	3	0	2	1	33	4
—	MF	(Greece) Christos Ardizoglou	29	7	1	0	2	0	32	7
—	MF	(Greece) Stelios Kaselakis	0	0	1	0	0	0	1	0
—	MF	(Greece) Spyros Thodis	32	1	2	0	2	0	36	1
—	MF	(Greece) Christos Kalaitzidis	12	0	2	1	1	0	15	1
—	MF	(Greece) Vangelis Vlachos	28	3	3	0	0	0	31	3
Forwards
—	FW	(Socialist Federal Republic of Yugoslavia) Dušan Bajević	32	25	3	2	2	0	37	27
—	FW	(Cyprus) Tasos Konstantinou	23	2	2	1	1	0	26	3
—	FW	(Greece) Thomas Mavros	28	14	3	5	2	0	33	19
—	FW	(Cyprus) Panikos Hatziloizou	9	0	1	0	0	0	10	0
—	FW	(Greece) Stefanos Zografos	0	0	0	0	0	0	0	0
—	FW	(Greece) Giorgos Chatziioannidis	7	2	2	0	0	0	9	2
Left during Winter Transfer Window
—	MF	(Greece) Mimis Domazos	5	0	1	0	1	0	7	0
—	MF	(Greece) Dionysis Tsamis	2	0	0	0	0	0	2	0
—	MF	(Greece) Takis Nikoloudis	3	1	0	0	2	0	5	1

=== Goalscorers ===
As of 24 May 1980
The list is sorted by competition order when total goals are equal, then by position and then alphabetically by surname.

Rank	Pos.	Player	Alpha Ethniki	Greek Cup	European Cup	Total
1	FW	(Socialist Federal Republic of Yugoslavia) Dušan Bajević	25	2	0	27
2	FW	(Greece) Thomas Mavros	14	5	0	19
3	MF	(Greece) Christos Ardizoglou	7	0	0	7
4	MF	(Socialist Federal Republic of Yugoslavia) Franjo Vladić	3	0	1	4
5	DF	(Greece) Lakis Nikolaou	3	0	0	3
5	MF	(Greece) Vangelis Vlachos	3	0	0	3
5	FW	(Cyprus) Tasos Konstantinou	2	1	0	3
8	FW	(Greece) Giorgos Chatziioannidis	2	0	0	2
9	DF	(Greece) Babis Intzoglou	1	0	0	1
9	DF	(Greece) Giannis Mousouris	1	0	0	1
9	MF	(Greece) Takis Nikoloudis	1	0	0	1
9	MF	(Greece) Spyros Thodis	1	0	0	1
9	MF	(Greece) Christos Kalaitzidis	0	1	0	1
Own goals			0	0	1	1
Totals			63	9	2	74

=== Hat-tricks ===
Numbers in superscript represent the goals that the player scored.

Player	Against	Result	Date	Competition	Source
(Socialist Federal Republic of Yugoslavia) Dušan Bajević	(Greece) Kastoria	4–2 (H)	4 November 1979	Alpha Ethniki	
(Greece) Thomas Mavros	(Greece) Panachaiki	4–3 (Α)	21 November 1979	Greek Cup	
(Socialist Federal Republic of Yugoslavia) Dušan Bajević	(Greece) Panachaiki	3–1 (Α)	2 December 1979	Alpha Ethniki	
(Socialist Federal Republic of Yugoslavia) Dušan Bajević	(Greece) Kavala	4–2 (H)	20 April 1980	Alpha Ethniki	

=== Clean sheets ===
As of 24 May 1980
The list is sorted by competition order when total clean sheets are equal and then alphabetically by surname. Clean sheets in games where both goalkeepers participated are awarded to the goalkeeper who started the game. Goalkeepers with no appearances are not included.

Rank	Player	Alpha Ethniki	Greek Cup	European Cup	Total
1	(Greece) Lakis Stergioudas	6	0	1	7
2	(Greece) Spyros Ikonomopoulos	2	0	0	2
3	(Greece) Nikos Christidis	1	0	0	1
Totals		9	0	1	10

=== Disciplinary record ===
As of 24 May 1980

N	P	Nat.	Name	Alpha Ethniki			Greek Cup			European Cup			Total			Notes
N	P	Nat.	Name	Yellow card	Second yellow card	Red card	Yellow card	Second yellow card	Red card	Yellow card	Second yellow card	Red card	Yellow card	Second yellow card	Red card	Notes
Goalkeepers
—	GK	(Greece)	Nikos Christidis													
—	GK	(Greece)	Lakis Stergioudas	1									1			
—	GK	(Greece)	Spyros Ikonomopoulos													
Defenders
—	DF	(Greece)	Dimitris Argyros													
—	DF	(Greece)	Lakis Nikolaou	3									3			
—	DF	(Greece)	Babis Intzoglou	5		1				2			7		1	
—	DF	(Greece)	Giannis Mousouris													
—	DF	(Greece)	Giorgos Kalogeropoulos				1						1			
—	DF	(Greece)	Petros Ravousis	2			1						3			
—	DF	(Greece)	Aris Damianidis	3			1					1	4		1	
—	DF	(Greece)	Dimitris Kotsos													
—	DF	(Greece)	Stavros Letsas													
—	DF	(Greece)	Panagiotis Stylianopoulos													
—	DF	(Greece)	Stelios Manolas													
Midfielders
—	MF	(Socialist Federal Republic of Yugoslavia)	Franjo Vladić	1									1			
—	MF	(Greece)	Christos Ardizoglou	1		1				1			2		1	
—	MF	(Greece)	Stelios Kaselakis													
—	MF	(Greece)	Spyros Thodis	2									2			
—	MF	(Greece)	Christos Kalaitzidis	1									1			
—	MF	(Greece)	Vangelis Vlachos	1									1			
Forwards
—	FW	(Socialist Federal Republic of Yugoslavia)	Dušan Bajević													
—	FW	(Cyprus)	Tasos Konstantinou													
—	FW	(Greece)	Thomas Mavros	2									2			
—	FW	(Cyprus)	Panikos Hatziloizou													
—	FW	(Greece)	Stefanos Zografos													
—	FW	(Greece)	Giorgos Chatziioannidis	1									1			
Left during Winter Transfer Window
—	MF	(Greece)	Mimis Domazos													
—	MF	(Greece)	Dionysis Tsamis													
—	MF	(Greece)	Takis Nikoloudis													

=== Starting 11 ===
This section presents the most frequently used formation along with the players with the most starts across all competitions.

N.	Formation	Matchday(s)
40	4–3–3	1–34

Nat.	Player	Pos.
(Greece)	Lakis Stergioudas	GK
(Greece)	Petros Ravousis	RCB
(Greece)	Lakis Nikolaou (C)	LCB
(Greece)	Giannis Mousouris	RB
(Greece)	Babis Intzoglou	LB
(Greece)	Spyros Thodis	DM
(Socialist Federal Republic of Yugoslavia)	Franjo Vladić	RCM
(Greece)	Vangelis Vlachos	LCM
(Greece)	Christos Ardizoglou	RW
(Greece)	Thomas Mavros	LW
(Socialist Federal Republic of Yugoslavia)	Dušan Bajević	CF

Last updated: 1980-05-24

== Awards ==
Player	Pos.	Award	Source
(Socialist Federal Republic of Yugoslavia) Dušan Bajević	FW	Alpha Ethniki Top Scorer	
