= 1981–82 AEK Athens F.C. season =

AEK Athens
1981–82 season
- Chairman: Andreas Zafiropoulos (until 14 June); Michalis Arkadis
- Manager: Hans Tilkowski (until 26 January); Zlatko Čajkovski
- Stadium: AEK Stadium
- Alpha Ethniki: 4th
- Greek Cup: Round of 16
- Top goalscorer: League: Thomas Mavros (16); All: Thomas Mavros (18)
- Highest home attendance: 34,329 vs Panathinaikos (21 February 1982)
- Lowest home attendance: 5,002 vs Kavala (7 March 1982)
- Average home league attendance: 14,663
- Biggest win: AEK Athens 5–0 Kavala
- Biggest defeat: PAOK 6–1 AEK Athens
| Home colours | Away colours |

The 1981–82 season was the 58th season in the existence of AEK Athens F.C. and the 23rd consecutive season in the top flight of Greek football. They competed in the Alpha Ethniki and the Greek Cup. The season began on 6 September 1981 and finished on 30 May 1982.

== Kits ==
Supplier: Adidas

| Home | Away |

== Overview ==
After the departure of Loukas Barlos at the end of the previous season, the club's administration was taken over by the sporting goods businessman, Andreas Zafiropoulos. The new administration proceeded with a renewal of the squad with the transfers of Takis Karagiozopoulos from Veria, Giannis Dintsikos from Kastoria and Dinos Ballis from Aris. Furthermore, since Dušan Bajević and Franjo Vladić had already left the club, they were replaced by the Yugoslav striker, Mojaš Radonjić in December and the well-known Bulgarian international midfielder, Hristo Bonev, whose transfer, agreed during the previous season, became effective. Former West Germany international goalkeeper Hans Tilkowski, who had managerial experience in his homeland, was appointed as manager. The club did not compete in any European competition, since they were serving a ban from the 1979–80 season.

The Championship got off to a poor start, as the team had to wait five matches for its first victory, winning only three of their opening ten matches and recording one of the worst starts in their history. The poor results led to the dismissal of Tilkowski at the end of the first round, two days after a defeat against Kastoria. He was replaced by Zlatko Čajkovski, who returned to the club four years after leading AEK to the domestic double in 1978 and remained a popular figure among the supporters. AEK's performances improved, but not enough to challenge for the title. Eventually, they finished fourth in the league, five points behind the champion Olympiacos and qualified for the next season's European competitions. Top scorer for AEK in the league was again Thomas Mavros with 17 goals. One of the few positives of the season was the conversion of young Stelios Manolas from the position of the right back to that of the center back, a position where he would go on to excel with both AEK and the national team.

In the Cup, AEK eliminated Panelefsiniakos in the first round with a 3–2 away victory. After passing through the second round without a match, they were drawn against PAOK in the round of 16 and were eliminated for the second consecutive year, by the club of Thessaloniki.

== Management team ==
| Position | Staff |
|---|---|
| Manager | (Socialist Federal Republic of Yugoslavia) Zlatko Čajkovski |
| Assistant manager | (Socialist Federal Republic of Yugoslavia) Alexi Petrović |
| Assistant manager | (Greece) Kostas Nestoridis |
| Goalkeeping coach | (Greece) Stelios Serafidis |
| Academy manager | (Greece) Stelios Serafidis |
| Head of Medical | (Greece) Lakis Nikolaou |

== Players ==
=== Squad information ===
NOTE: The players are the ones that have been announced by the AEK Athens' press release. No edits should be made unless a player arrival or exit is announced. Updated 30 May 1982, 23:59 UTC+3.

| Player | Nat. | Position(s) | Date of birth (Age) | Signed | Previous club | Transfer fee | Contract until |
Goalkeepers
| Nikos Christidis | (Greece) | GK | 2 August 1944 (aged 37) | 1976 | (Greece) Aris | ₯1,500,000 | 1984 |
| Lakis Stergioudas | (Greece) | GK | 11 December 1952 (aged 29) | 1972 | (Greece) Niki Polygyros | ₯36,000 | 1985 |
| Spyros Ikonomopoulos | (Greece) | GK | 25 July 1959 (aged 22) | 1979 | (Greece) AEK Athens U20 | — | 1984 |
Defenders
| Lakis Nikolaou (Captain) | (Greece) | CB / RB / ST / RW | 17 July 1949 (aged 32) | 1971 | (Greece) Atromitos | ₯600,000 | 1982 |
| Giannis Mousouris | (Greece) | RB / RM / ST | 26 January 1951 (aged 31) | 1977 | (Greece) AEL | ₯2,500,000 | 1985 |
| Giorgos Rigas | (Greece) | CB / RB / DM | 6 December 1953 (aged 28) | 1980 | (Greece) Kavala | Free | 1985 |
| Michalis Tzirakis | (Greece) | CB / RB / RM | 6 March 1954 (aged 28) | 1980 | (Greece) OFI | ₯8,000,000 | 1985 |
| Petros Ravousis | (Greece) | CB / RB | 1 October 1954 (aged 27) | 1972 | (Greece) Aetos Skydra | Free | 1985 |
| Vangelis Paraprastanitis | (Greece) | LB / CB / DM | 10 February 1955 (aged 27) | 1980 | (Greece) Trikala | ₯4,000,000 | 1985 |
| Stavros Letsas | (Greece) | RB / RM / CB | 6 March 1957 (aged 25) | 1979 | (Greece) Agioi Anargyroi | Free | 1986 |
| Panagiotis Stylianopoulos | (Greece) | RB / LB / RM / DM | 4 September 1957 (aged 24) | 1978 | (Greece) AEK Athens U20 | — | 1986 |
| Stelios Manolas | (Greece) | CB / RB | 13 July 1961 (aged 20) | 1980 | (Greece) AEK Athens U20 | — | 1984 |
| Lysandros Georgamlis | (Greece) | RB / CB / DM / LB | 25 February 1962 (aged 20) | 1980 | (Greece) AEK Athens U20 | — | 1985 |
Midfielders
| Hristo Bonev | (Bulgaria) | AM / CM / SS | 3 February 1947 (aged 35) | 1981 | Free agent | — | 1982 |
| Petros Karavitis | (Greece) | DM / CB / CM / LB / LM / LW | 11 March 1952 (aged 30) | 1980 | (Greece) Olympiacos | Free | 1983 |
| Christos Ardizoglou | (Greece) (Israel) | RM / LM / RW / LW / AM / RB / LB | 25 March 1953 (aged 29) | 1974 | (Greece) Apollon Athens | ₯12,000,000 | 1986 |
| Spyros Thodis | (Greece) | CM / AM / DM | 23 July 1955 (aged 26) | 1979 | (Greece) Anagennisi Karditsa | ₯4,000,000 | 1984 |
| Dinos Ballis | (Greece) | AM / CM / DM / SS / ST / CB | 25 May 1957 (aged 25) | 1981 | (Greece) Aris | ₯17,000,000 | 1986 |
| Vangelis Vlachos | (Greece) | AM / CM / RM / LM | 6 January 1962 (aged 20) | 1979 | (Greece) AEK Athens U20 | — | 1984 |
Forwards
| Mojaš Radonjić | (Socialist Federal Republic of Yugoslavia) | ST / SS | 23 February 1950 (aged 32) | 1981 | (Socialist Federal Republic of Yugoslavia) Budućnost Podgorica | ₯9,000,000 | 1984 |
| Thomas Mavros | (Greece) | ST / LW | 31 May 1954 (aged 28) | 1976 | (Greece) Panionios | ₯10,000,000 | 1983 |
| Giannis Dintsikos | (Greece) | ST / SS / RW / LW / AM | 25 June 1960 (aged 22) | 1981 | (Greece) Kastoria | ₯20,000,000 | 1986 |
| Giorgos Chatziioannidis | (Greece) | ST | 1 June 1961 (aged 21) | 1979 | (Greece) AEK Athens U20 | — | 1984 |
| Takis Karagiozopoulos | (Greece) | ST / CB / DM | 4 February 1961 (aged 21) | 1981 | (Greece) Veria | ₯8,000,000 | 1986 |
| Panagiotis Angelidis | (Greece) | RW / ST | 27 July 1961 (aged 20) | 1982 | (Greece) AEK Athens U20 | Free | 1986 |
Left during Winter Transfer Window
| Manolis Kottis | (Greece) | ST / LW / RW | 25 January 1955 (aged 27) | 1980 | (Greece) Rodos | ₯7,500,000 | 1985 |
| Thomas Stafylas | (Greece) | ST / RW / LW / RM / LM | 4 April 1958 (aged 24) | 1979 | (Greece) AEK Athens U20 | — | 1984 |

== Transfers ==
=== In ===
==== Summer ====
| Pos. | Player | From | Fee | Date | Contract Until | Source |
|---|---|---|---|---|---|---|
| DF | (Greece) Stavros Letsas | (Greece) Panelefsiniakos | Loan return | 1 July 1981 | 30 June 1986 | |
| DF | (Greece) Panagiotis Stylianopoulos | (Greece) Atromitos | Loan return | 1 July 1981 | 30 June 1986 | |
| MF | (Greece) Giorgos Vlantis | (Greece) APS Patrai | Loan return | 1 July 1981 | 30 November 1984 | |
| MF | (Bulgaria) Hristo Bonev | Free agent | Free transfer | 1 July 1981 | 30 July 1982 | |
| MF | (Greece) Dinos Ballis | (Greece) Aris | ₯17,000,000 | 18 July 1981 | 30 June 1986 | |
| FW | (Greece) Takis Karagiozopoulos | (Greece) Veria | ₯8,000,000 | 31 July 1981 | 30 June 1986 | |
| FW | (Greece) Giannis Dintsikos | (Greece) Kastoria | ₯20,000,000 | 6 July 1981 | 30 June 1986 | |
| FW | (Greece) Giorgos Chatziioannidis | (Greece) PAS Giannina | Loan return | 1 July 1981 | 30 June 1984 | |

==== Winter ====
| Pos. | Player | From | Fee | Date | Contract Until | Source |
|---|---|---|---|---|---|---|
| FW | (Greece) Panagiotis Angelidis | (Greece) AEK Athens U20 | Promotion | 7 January 1982 | 30 November 1986 | |
| FW | (Socialist Federal Republic of Yugoslavia) Mojaš Radonjić | (Socialist Federal Republic of Yugoslavia) Budućnost Podgorica | ₯9,000,000 | 1 December 1981 | 30 June 1984 | |

=== Out ===
==== Summer ====
| Pos. | Player | To | Fee | Date | Source |
|---|---|---|---|---|---|
| DF | (Greece) Giorgos Kalogeropoulos | (Greece) OFI | Contract termination | 31 July 1981 | |
| MF | (Greece) Kostas Eleftherakis | (Greece) Fostiras | End of contract | 17 August 1981 | |
| MF | (Socialist Federal Republic of Yugoslavia) Franjo Vladić | (Socialist Federal Republic of Yugoslavia) Velež Mostar | End of contract | 1 July 1981 | |
| FW | (Greece) Dimitrios Gesios | (Greece) Veria | ₯400,000 | 13 August 1981 | |
| FW | (Greece) Dimitrios Papadopoulos | (Greece) Irodotos | Free transfer | 31 July 1981 | |
| FW | (Socialist Federal Republic of Yugoslavia) Dušan Bajević | (Socialist Federal Republic of Yugoslavia) Velež Mostar | End of contract | 1 July 1981 | |

==== Winter ====
| Pos. | Player | To | Fee | Date | Source |
|---|---|---|---|---|---|
| FW | (Greece) Thomas Stafylas | (Greece) Acharnaikos | Contract termination | 11 December 1981 | |

=== Loan out ===
==== Summer ====
| Pos. | Player | To | Fee | Date | Until | Option to buy | Source |
|---|---|---|---|---|---|---|---|
| GK | (Greece) Dimitris Alafogiannis | (Greece) Atromitos | Free | 31 July 1981 | 30 June 1982 | ✗ | |
| MF | (Greece) Giorgos Vlantis | (Greece) Diagoras | Free | 13 August 1981 | 30 June 1982 | ✗ | |

==== Winter ====
| Pos. | Player | To | Fee | Date | Until | Option to buy | Source |
|---|---|---|---|---|---|---|---|
| FW | (Greece) Manolis Kottis | (Greece) Rodos | ₯700,000 | 1 January 1982 | 30 November 1982 | ✓ | |

=== Contract renewals ===
| Pos. | Player | Date | Former Exp. Date | New Exp. Date | Source |
|---|---|---|---|---|---|
| MF | (Greece) Christos Ardizoglou | 29 June 1982 | 30 June 1982 | 30 June 1986 | |

=== Overall transfer activity ===
==== Expenditure ====
Summer: ▼ ₯45,000,000

Winter: ▼ ₯9,000,000

Total: ▼ ₯54,000,000

==== Income ====
Summer: ▲ ₯400,000

Winter: ▲ ₯700,000

Total: ▲ ₯1,100,000

==== Net Totals ====
Summer: ▼ ₯44,600,000

Winter: ▼ ₯8,300,000

Total: ▼ ₯52,900,000

== Pre-season and friendlies ==
| 26 July 1981 Friendly | Badener | 0–5 | AEK Athens | Baden bei Wien |
| 18:00 EEST (UTC+3) | | Report | Manolas 10'; Ardizoglou 46', 62'; Bonev 54'; Ballis (penalty missed) 70'; Dintsikos 88' | Stadium: Platz des Badener AC; Attendance: 1,000 |

| 28 July 1981 Friendly | Schwechat | 0–2 | AEK Athens | Vienna |
| 19:00 EEST (UTC+3) | | Report | Chatziioanidis 62'; Vlachos 73' | Attendance: 500 |

| 31 July 1981 Friendly | Salzburg | 1–2 | AEK Athens | Salzburg |
| 20:00 EEST (UTC+3) | Perlak 46' | Report | Ardizoglou 2', 40' | Stadium: Stadion Lehen; Attendance: 10,000; Referee: Werner Föckler (West Germany) |

| 3 August 1981 Friendly | AEK Athens | 4–1 | Kastoria | Nea Filadelfeia |
| 21:00 EEST (UTC+3) | Chatziioanidis 26', 27'; Vlachos 33'; Nikolaou 34' | Report | Argyros 43' | Stadium: AEK Stadium; Attendance: 8,744; Referee: Stelios Marinelis (Athens) |

| 10 August 1981 Friendly | AEK Athens | 2–2 | Aston Villa | Nea Filadelfeia |
| 21:00 EEST (UTC+3) | Chatziioanidis 14', 70' | Report | Evans (yellow card) 14', (goal) 49'; Bremner 31'; Mortimer (yellow card) 48'; Cowans (yellow card) 48' | Stadium: AEK Stadium; Attendance: 24,974; Referee: Giorgos Ballis (Athens) |

| 13 August 1981 Friendly | AEK Athens | 1–1 | PAS Giannina | Nea Filadelfeia |
| 21:00 EEST (UTC+3) | Vlachos (penalty missed) 60', 68' | Report | Glasmanis 7' | Stadium: AEK Stadium; Attendance: 3,598; Referee: Panagiotis Pagonis (Athens) |

| 17 August 1981 Friendly | AEK Athens | 1–2 | Eintracht Frankfurt | Nea Filadelfeia |
| 21:00 EEST (UTC+3) | Ardizoglou 77' | Report | Lorant (yellow card) 36'; Anthes 55'; Ravousis 83' (o.g.) | Stadium: AEK Stadium; Attendance: 12,496; Referee: Makis Germanakos (Athens) |

| 20 August 1981 Friendly | PAOK | 2–2 | AEK Athens | Thessaloniki |
| 21:00 EEST (UTC+3) | Kostikos 4' (pen.); Iosifidis 88' | Report | Dintsikos 16'; Ardizoglou 19' | Stadium: Toumba Stadium; Attendance: 10,126; Referee: Giorgos Pournatzis (Thessaloniki) |

| 23 August 1981 Friendly | AEK Athens | 2–2 | Olympiacos | Nea Filadelfeia |
| 21:00 EEST (UTC+3) | Ardizoglou 12'; Bonev 44' | Report | Orfanos 23'; Ahlström 77' | Stadium: AEK Stadium; Attendance: 27,268; Referee: Stelios Marinelis (Athens) |

| 26 August 1981 Friendly | AEK Athens | 1–4 | Red Star Belgrade | Nea Filadelfeia |
| 21:00 EEST (UTC+3) | Ardizoglou 64' | Report | D. Savić 22', (penalty missed) 63', (yellow card) 75'; R. Savić 24'; Janjanin 41'; Djurovski 78' | Stadium: AEK Stadium; Attendance: 12,107; Referee: Leonidas Printezis (Athens) |

| 30 August 1981 Friendly | AEK Athens | 3–2 | Aris | Nea Filadelfeia |
| 21:00 EEST (UTC+3) | Thodis 67', 80'; Ardizoglou 74' | Report | Zindros 33'; Kouis 53' | Stadium: AEK Stadium; Attendance: 7,514; Referee: Giorgos Voulgaris (Athens) |

| 17 September 1981 Friendly | AEK Athens | 6–4 | Kallithea | Nea Filadelfeia |
| 17:00 EEST (UTC+3) | Chatziioanidis 5'; Kottis 6', 70', 77'; Karagiozopoulos 32'; Georgamlis 39' | Report | Kypritidis 36', 83'; Karagiorgas 62'; Konstantinidis 53' | Stadium: AEK Stadium |

| 23 September 1981 Friendly | AEK Athens | 1–1 | Panelefsiniakos | Nea Filadelfeia |
| 17:00 EEST (UTC+3) | Kottis 47' | Report | Saipas 37' | Stadium: AEK Stadium; Referee: Kouvlakis |

| 12 October 1981 Friendly | AEK Athens | 4–4 | Fort Lauderdale Strikers | Nea Filadelfeia |
| 20:00 EEST (UTC+3) | Ballis 35' (pen.); Chatziioanidis 71', 76'; Manolas 81' | Report | Hölzenbein 39'; Müller 51' (pen.); Cubillas 54', 57' | Stadium: AEK Stadium; Attendance: 3,114; Referee: Vasilis Vourakis (Piraeus) |

| 15 October 1981 Friendly | Trikala | 1–1 | AEK Athens | Trikala |
| 15:30 EEST (UTC+3) | Patras 10' | Report | Chatziioanidis 42' | Stadium: Trikala Municipal Stadium; Attendance: 2,000; Referee: Dimitriou |
Note: Friendly match as part of the transfer of Vangelis Paraprastanitis from the previous season.

| 28 November 1981 Friendly | AEK Athens | 4–1 | Veria | Nea Filadelfeia |
| 15:15 EET (UTC+2) | Kottis 10'; Radonjić 30', 89'; Karavitis 63' | Report | Chatzisavvidis 64' | Stadium: AEK Stadium; Attendance: 2,000; Referee: Nikos Karathanasis (Athens) |
Note: Friendly match as part of the transfer of Takis Karagiozopoulos.

| 30 November 1981 Friendly | Panachaiki | 3–0 | AEK Athens | Patras |
| 14:45 EET (UTC+2) | Filippopoulos 34' (pen.); Dalakas 54'; Tsampas 78' | Report | Ballis (penalty missed) 39' | Stadium: Panachaiki Stadium; Attendance: 3,000; Referee: Vasilis Messalas (Patras) |

| 17 March 1982 Friendly | AEK Athens | 6–1 | Agioi Anargyroi | Nea Filadelfeia |
| 16:00 EET (UTC+2) | Mousouris 41'; Thodis 49', 89'; Ardizoglou 57'; Chatziioanidis 78', 82' | Report | Koutoumadis 30' | Stadium: AEK Stadium; Attendance: 1,000; Referee: Zlatko Čajkovski |
Note: Lakis Stergioudas, who had been out of competitive action for 15 months, played with Agioi Anargyroi against AEK.

| 31 March 1982 Friendly | Atromitos | 1–2 | AEK Athens | Peristeri |
| 16:30 EET (UTC+2) | Tsantakis 58' | Report | Mitrakos 39' (o.g.); Thodis 63' | Stadium: Peristeri Stadium; Attendance: 500; Referee: Kouvlakis |

| 14 April 1982 Friendly | AEK Athens | 3–0 | Chalkida | Nea Filadelfeia |
| 17:00 EET (UTC+2) | Tatidis 10', 30'; Chatziioanidis 21' (pen.) | Report | | Stadium: AEK Stadium; Attendance: 1,000; Referee: Kouvlakis |

== Competitions ==
=== Overall record ===
| Competition | First match | Last match | Starting round | Final position | Record | | | | | | | |
| Competition | First match | Last match | Starting round | Final position | Pld | W | D | L | GF | GA | GD | Win % |
|---|---|---|---|---|---|---|---|---|---|---|---|---|
| Alpha Ethniki | 6 September 1981 | 30 May 1982 | Matchday 1 | 4th | 34 | 17 | 11 | 6 | 54 | 36 | +18 | 50.00 |
| Greek Cup | 24 December 1981 | 24 February 1982 | First round | Round of 16 | 3 | 1 | 1 | 1 | 6 | 10 | −4 | 33.33 |
| Total | | | | | 37 | 18 | 12 | 7 | 60 | 46 | +14 | 48.65 |

Last updated: 30 May 1982
Source: Competitions

=== Alpha Ethniki ===
==== League table ====
| Pos | Team | Pld | W | D | L | GF | GA | GD | Pts | Qualification or relegation |
|---|---|---|---|---|---|---|---|---|---|---|
| 2 | Panathinaikos | 34 | 19 | 12 | 3 | 58 | 28 | +30 | 50 (Note: Championship play–off: Olympiacos–Panathinaikos 2–1 (see below).) | Qualification for Cup Winners' Cup first round |
| 3 | PAOK | 34 | 18 | 10 | 6 | 55 | 22 | +33 | 46 | Qualification for UEFA Cup first round |
| 4 | AEK Athens | 34 | 17 | 11 | 6 | 54 | 36 | +18 | 45 | Qualification for UEFA Cup first round |
| 5 | Aris | 34 | 15 | 11 | 8 | 56 | 30 | +26 | 41 | |
| 6 | Iraklis | 34 | 15 | 10 | 9 | 52 | 38 | +14 | 40 | |

Source: RSSSF
Rules for classification: 1st points; 2nd decision match; 3rd head-to-head goal difference.

==== Results summary ====
| Overall | | | | | | | | Home | | | | | | Away | | | | | |
| Pld | W | D | L | GF | GA | GD | Pts | W | D | L | GF | GA | GD | W | D | L | GF | GA | GD |
|---|---|---|---|---|---|---|---|---|---|---|---|---|---|---|---|---|---|---|---|
| 34 | 17 | 11 | 6 | 54 | 36 | +18 | 45 | 12 | 5 | 0 | 36 | 12 | +24 | 5 | 6 | 6 | 18 | 24 | −6 |

Source: Competitive matches

==== Results by Matchday ====
| Round | 1 | 2 | 3 | 4 | 5 | 6 | 7 | 8 | 9 | 10 | 11 | 12 | 13 | 14 | 15 | 16 | 17 | 18 | 19 | 20 | 21 | 22 | 23 | 24 | 25 | 26 | 27 | 28 | 29 | 30 | 31 | 32 | 33 | 34 |
|---|---|---|---|---|---|---|---|---|---|---|---|---|---|---|---|---|---|---|---|---|---|---|---|---|---|---|---|---|---|---|---|---|---|---|
| Ground | A | H | A | A | H | A | H | A | H | A | H | H | A | H | A | H | A | H | A | H | H | A | H | A | H | A | H | A | A | H | A | H | A | H |
| Result | L | D | D | L | W | D | W | W | D | L | W | W | W | D | W | D | L | W | D | W | W | W | W | L | W | D | D | W | L | W | D | W | D | W |
| Position | 14 | 14 | 14 | 17 | 14 | 12 | 9 | 8 | 7 | 9 | 7 | 7 | 5 | 5 | 4 | 4 | 6 | 4 | 4 | 4 | 4 | 4 | 3 | 4 | 4 | 4 | 4 | 4 | 4 | 4 | 4 | 4 | 4 | 4 |

Source: Competitive matches
A = Away; H = Home; W = Win; D = Draw; L = Loss; P = Postponed

==== Matches ====
| 6 September 1981 1 | OFI | 1–0 | AEK Athens | Heraklion |
| 16:45 EEST (UTC+3) | Tassopoulos 56' (pen.), (yellow card) 79'; Agiomamitis (yellow card) 57'; Christofis (yellow card) 68' | | | Stadium: Theodoros Vardinogiannis Stadium; Attendance: 6,500; Referee: Kostas Tsouris (Thrace) |

| 13 September 1981 2 | AEK Athens | 2–2 | Doxa Drama | Chalcis |
| 16:45 EEST (UTC+3) | Mavros 76'; Vlachos 88' | | Tsevretzis (yellow card) 35'; Stavrou 47'; Strantzalis 67' | Stadium: Municipal Stadium of Chalkida; Attendance: 8,231; Referee: Anastasiadis (Piraeus) |
Note: Match held at Chalcis because AEK had a stadium ban due to incidents in a cup game against Aris in the previous season.

| 20 September 1981 3 | Rodos | 0–0 | AEK Athens | Ialysos |
| 16:45 EEST (UTC+3) | Papaioannou (yellow card) 89' | | Chatziioannidis (yellow card) 55'; Thodis (yellow card) 89' | Stadium: Municipal Stadium Ekonomideio; Attendance: 7,080; Referee: Antonis Vassaras (Thessaloniki) |

| 27 September 1981 4 | Panathinaikos | 3–0 | AEK Athens | Ampelokipoi |
| 15:30 EET (UTC+2) | Galakos 2', 41', 63' (pen.) | | Thodis (penalty missed) 59' | Stadium: Leoforos Alexandras Stadium; Attendance: 23,720; Referee: Vasilis Tikmoglou (Thessaloniki) |

| 4 October 1981 5 | AEK Athens | 1–0 | Panionios | Nea Filadelfeia |
| | Dintsikos 20' | | | Stadium: AEK Stadium; Attendance: 12,556; Referee: Giorgos Kounalakis (Heraklion) |

| 25 October 1981 6 | Kavala | 0–0 | AEK Athens | Kavala |
| 14:45 EET (UTC+2) | | | | Stadium: Kavala National Stadium; Attendance: 3,947; Referee: Giorgos Pournatzis (Thessaloniki) |

| 1 November 1981 7 | AEK Athens | 3–0 | Iraklis | Nea Filadelfeia |
| 14:45 EET (UTC+2) | Dintsikos 36'; Mavros 79'; Ardizoglou 84'; Ravousis (yellow card) 84' | | | Stadium: AEK Stadium; Attendance: 15,396; Referee: Dimitris Asvestopoulos (Kilkis) |

| 8 November 1981 8 | Apollon Athens | 0–1 | AEK Athens | Rizoupoli |
| 14:45 EET (UTC+2) | | | Ardizoglou 11' | Stadium: Rizoupoli Stadium; Attendance: 8,142; Referee: Vangelis Tsoumanis (Larissa) |

| 22 November 1981 9 | AEK Athens | 2–2 | Olympiacos | Nea Filadelfeia |
| 14:45 EET (UTC+2) | Mavros 12', 81'; Stylianopoulos (yellow card) 80' | | Nikoloudis 9'; Lemonis 55' (pen.); Persias (yellow card) 83' | Stadium: AEK Stadium; Attendance: 33,201; Referee: Nikos Zlatanos (Thessaloniki) |

| 6 December 1981 10 | Aris | 3–0 | AEK Athens | Katerini |
| 14:45 EET (UTC+2) | Zindros 28' (pen.), 65'; Mulahasanović 83' | | | Stadium: Katerini Stadium; Attendance: 5,944; Referee: Pantelis Argyriou (Dodecanese) |

| 13 December 1981 11 | AEK Athens | 2–0 | AEL | Nea Filadelfeia |
| 14:45 EET (UTC+2) | Ballis 45'; Karavitis 62' (pen.), (penalty missed) 76' | | Plitsis (yellow card) | Stadium: AEK Stadium; Attendance: 8,250; Referee: Vasilis Vourakis (Piraeus) |

| 20 December 1981 12 | AEK Athens | 3–1 | Panserraikos | Nea Filadelfeia |
| 14:45 EET (UTC+2) | Thodis 5'; Karavitis 8' (pen.); Vlachos 72' | | Pantazis 59' | Stadium: AEK Stadium; Attendance: 11,216; Referee: Vasilis Messalas (Patras) |

| 27 December 1981 13 | Ethnikos Piraeus | 1–2 | AEK Athens | Piraeus |
| 14:45 EET (UTC+2) | Katsikogiannis 35' | | Karavitis 61' (pen.); Chatziioannidis 84' | Stadium: Karaiskakis Stadium; Attendance: 19,645; Referee: Manolis Vardakas (Kozani) |

| 3 January 1982 14 | AEK Athens | 1–1 | PAOK | Nea Filadelfeia |
| | Radonjić 24'; Ballis (yellow card) 39'; Vlachos (yellow card) 57' | | Georgopoulos (yellow card) 8'; Koudas 68' | Stadium: AEK Stadium; Attendance: 23,915; Referee: Kostas Dimitriadis (Piraeus) |

| 10 January 1982 15 | Korinthos | 0–1 | AEK Athens | Corinth |
| | | | Radonjić 55'; Tzirakis (yellow card) 67' | Stadium: Korinthos Stadium; Attendance: 6,980; Referee: Giorgos Koukoulakis (Heraklion) |

| 17 January 1982 16 | AEK Athens | 0–0 | PAS Giannina | Nea Filadelfeia |
| | | | Montez (yellow card) 13'; Papazoglou (yellow card) 22'; Papachristou (yellow card) 74' | Stadium: AEK Stadium; Attendance: 16,086; Referee: Dimitris Sidiropoulos (Thessaloniki) |

| 24 January 1982 17 | Kastoria | 2–1 | AEK Athens | Kastoria |
| | Liolios 15', 26' | | Ballis 56' | Stadium: Municipal Stadium of Kastoria; Attendance: 2,971; Referee: Theoklis Kontzalis (Thessaloniki) |

| 31 January 1982 18 | AEK Athens | 1–0 | OFI | Nea Filadelfeia |
| 14:45 EET (UTC+2) | Mavros 18' (pen.); Karavitis (yellow card) 20'; Tzirakis (yellow card) 21' | | Kirisits (yellow card) 17'; Passas (yellow card) 27' (yellow-red card) 35'; Koronakis (yellow card) 66' | Stadium: AEK Stadium; Attendance: 12,360; Referee: Dimitris Tsolakis (Serres) |

| 7 February 1982 19 | Doxa Drama | 2–2 | AEK Athens | Drama |
| 14:45 EET (UTC+2) | Karavitis 6', 27', (yellow card) 71'; Stylianopoulos (yellow card) 42' (yellow-red card) 80'; Georgamlis (yellow card) 56' | | Kontos (yellow card) 6'; Vučeković 8', 66', (yellow card) 42'; Strantzalis (yellow card) 50' | Stadium: Doxa Drama Stadium; Attendance: 6,264; Referee: Antonis Vassaras (Thessaloniki) |

| 14 February 1982 20 | AEK Athens | 2–0 | Rodos | Nea Filadelfeia |
| 14:15 EET (UTC+2) | Manolas (yellow card); Nikolaou 41'; Mavros 63' | | Kambala (yellow card) | Stadium: AEK Stadium; Attendance: 6,756; Referee: Kanaris (Thessaloniki) |

| 21 February 1982 21 | AEK Athens | 1–0 | Panathinaikos | Nea Filadelfeia |
| 15:15 EET (UTC+2) | Georgamlis (yellow card) 21'; Radonjić 25', (yellow card) 75'; Vlachos (yellow card) 35'; Mavros (yellow card) 55' | | Livathinos (yellow card) 13'; Konstantinou (yellow card) 35'; Charalampidis (yellow card) 79'; Kouropoulos (yellow card) 90+1' | Stadium: AEK Stadium; Attendance: 34,329; Referee: Panagiotis Spyropoulos (Thessaloniki) |

| 28 February 1982 22 | Panionios | 1–2 | AEK Athens | Nea Smyrni |
| 15:15 EET (UTC+2) | Mavrikis 48'; Tsoukleidis (yellow card) 64' (yellow-red card) 73' | | Karavitis (red card) 3'; Mavros 24', 87' | Stadium: Nea Smyrni Stadium; Attendance: 11,650; Referee: Stathis Kosmopoulos (Elis) |

| 7 March 1982 23 | AEK Athens | 5–0 | Kavala | Nea Filadelfeia |
| 15:15 EET (UTC+2) | Mavros 1'; Karagiozopoulos 6', (yellow card) 87'; Georgamlis 48'; Thodis 61'; Radonjić 85' | | | Stadium: AEK Stadium; Attendance: 5,002; Referee: Vangelis Tsoumanis (Larissa) |

| 14 March 1982 24 | Iraklis | 3–2 | AEK Athens | Thessaloniki |
| | Dimitrov 13'; Kalampakas 51'; Kofidis 63' | | Georgamlis 52'; Mavros 84' | Stadium: Kaftanzoglio Stadium; Attendance: 10,895; Referee: Dimitris Asvestopoulos (Kilkis) |

| 21 March 1982 25 | AEK Athens | 2–1 | Apollon Athens | Nea Filadelfeia |
| 15:15 EET (UTC+2) | Mavros 20'; Nikolaou 44' | | Kastanos 18' | Stadium: AEK Stadium; Attendance: 13,018; Referee: Vasilis Messalas (Patras) |

| 28 March 1982 26 | Olympiacos | 2–2 | AEK Athens | Piraeus |
| 16:30 EEST (UTC+3) | Kousoulakis 46'; Persias 48' | | Paraprastanitis (yellow card); Ballis 15'; Radonjić 71', (yellow card) | Stadium: Karaiskakis Stadium; Attendance: 35,450; Referee: Dimitris Koutoulas (Serres) |

| 4 April 1982 27 | AEK Athens | 2–2 | Aris | Nea Filadelfeia |
| | Karavitis 65' (pen.); Karagiozopoulos (yellow card) 68'; Vlachos (yellow card) 72'; Thodis (red card) 76'; Mousouris 83' | | Charalampidis 19'; Mulahasanović 33'; Chatziantoniou (yellow card) 49'; Semertzidis (yellow card) 62' | Stadium: AEK Stadium; Attendance: 19,333; Referee: Pantelis Argyriou (Dodecanese) |

| 11 April 1982 28 | AEL | 1–2 | AEK Athens | Trikala |
| 16:30 EEST (UTC+3) | Maloumidis 50' (pen.) | | Letsas 20'; Ballis 47'; Karavitis (yellow card) 88' | Stadium: Trikala Municipal Stadium; Attendance: 11,627; Referee: Manolis Vardakas (Kozani) |

| 25 April 1982 29 | Panserraikos | 2–0 | AEK Athens | Serres |
| 16:30 EEST (UTC+3) | Papadimitriou 18'; Batis (yellow card) 20'; Pantazis 76'; Tarasis (yellow card) 83' | | Radonjić (red card) 63'; Karavitis (red card) 63' | Stadium: Serres Municipal Stadium; Attendance: 4,484; Referee: Nikos Filippiadis (Thessaloniki) |

| 2 May 1982 30 | AEK Athens | 3–1 | Ethnikos Piraeus | Nea Filadelfeia |
| 16:30 EEST (UTC+3) | Georgamlis 28'; Chatziioannidis (yellow card) 42'; Mavros 51', 89'; Manolas (yellow card) 81' | | Peppes 8'; Pittas (yellow card) 30'; Batsinilas (yellow card) 42' | Stadium: AEK Stadium; Attendance: 11,522; Referee: Giorgos Kifonidis (Kavala) |

| 9 May 1982 31 | PAOK | 1–1 | AEK Athens | Thessaloniki |
| 17:30 EEST (UTC+3) | Georgopoulos 25' | | Mavros 76' | Stadium: Toumba Stadium; Attendance: 15,706; Referee: Athanasios Stamatis (Piraeus) |

| 16 May 1982 32 | AEK Athens | 4–1 | Korinthos | Nea Filadelfeia |
| 17:30 EEST (UTC+3) | Mousouris 4'; Georgamlis 47'; Mavros 66'; Ballis 79'; Paraprastanitis (yellow card) 87' | | Pissas (yellow card) 47'; Misailidis (yellow card) 74'; Vavalis 88' (pen.) | Stadium: AEK Stadium; Attendance: 7,137; Referee: Panagiotis Tsolakidis (Thessaloniki) |

| 23 May 1982 33 | PAS Giannina | 2–2 | AEK Athens | Ioannina |
| 17:30 EEST (UTC+3) | Ananiadis 40'; Glasmanis 72' | | Vlachos 36', 84' | Stadium: Zosimades Stadium; Attendance: 6,175; Referee: Theoklis Kontzalis (Thessaloniki) |

| 30 May 1982 34 | AEK Athens | 2–1 | Kastoria | Nea Filadelfeia |
| 17:30 EEST (UTC+3) | Radonjić 33'; Mavros 53' (pen.) | | Voitsidis 17' | Stadium: AEK Stadium; Attendance: 10,346; Referee: Giorgos Kounalakis (Heraklion) |
Note: Lakis Nikolaou was honoured before the match in recognition of his retirement from football.

=== Greek Cup ===
==== Matches ====
| 24 December 1981 First round | Panelefsiniakos | 2–3 | AEK Athens | Elefsina |
| 14:00 EET (UTC+2) | Adam (yellow card) 2'; Barkoglou 15', 22' | | Karavitis (yellow card) 26'; Dintsikos 45', 47'; Nikolaou 83' | Stadium: Municipal Stadium of Elefsina; Referee: Rigas Angelakis (Macedonia) |

AEK Athens qualified to the Round of 16 without a match.

===== Round of 16 =====
| 3 February 1982 First leg | PAOK | 6–1 | AEK Athens | Thessaloniki |
| 15:00 EET (UTC+2) | Koudas 8'; Dimopoulos 26', 52', 72'; Singas (yellow card) 34', (goal) 69'; Guerino 66' | Report | Mavros 25', (yellow card) 63'; Ardizoglou (yellow card) 35'; Ballis (yellow card) 76' | Stadium: Toumba Stadium; Attendance: 19,550; Referee: Dimitris Tsolakis (Serres) |

| 24 February 1982 Second leg | AEK Athens | 2–2 (3–8 agg.) | PAOK | Nea Filadelfeia |
| 15:00 EET (UTC+2) | Mavros (penalty missed) 25', 80'; Nikolaou 63' | | Dimopoulos 30', 54' | Stadium: AEK Stadium; Attendance: 7,117; Referee: Anastasiadis (Piraeus) |

== Statistics ==
=== Squad statistics ===
As of 30 May 1982

| No. | Pos | Player | Alpha Ethniki | | Greek Cup | | Total | |
| No. | Pos | Player | Apps | Goals | Apps | Goals | Apps | Goals |
Goalkeepers
| — | GK | (Greece) Nikos Christidis | 21 | 0 | 2 | 0 | 23 | 0 |
| — | GK | (Greece) Lakis Stergioudas | 2 | 0 | 0 | 0 | 2 | 0 |
| — | GK | (Greece) Spyros Ikonomopoulos | 12 | 0 | 1 | 0 | 13 | 0 |
Defenders
| — | DF | (Greece) Lakis Nikolaou | 24 | 2 | 3 | 2 | 27 | 4 |
| — | DF | (Greece) Giannis Mousouris | 10 | 2 | 1 | 0 | 11 | 2 |
| — | DF | (Greece) Giorgos Rigas | 8 | 0 | 0 | 0 | 8 | 0 |
| — | DF | (Greece) Michalis Tzirakis | 13 | 0 | 1 | 0 | 14 | 0 |
| — | DF | (Greece) Petros Ravousis | 8 | 0 | 0 | 0 | 8 | 0 |
| — | DF | (Greece) Vangelis Paraprastanitis | 24 | 0 | 2 | 0 | 26 | 0 |
| — | DF | (Greece) Stavros Letsas | 5 | 1 | 0 | 0 | 5 | 1 |
| — | DF | (Greece) Panagiotis Stylianopoulos | 25 | 0 | 2 | 0 | 27 | 0 |
| — | DF | (Greece) Stelios Manolas | 32 | 0 | 2 | 0 | 34 | 0 |
| — | DF | (Greece) Lysandros Georgamlis | 28 | 4 | 3 | 0 | 31 | 4 |
Midfielders
| — | MF | (People's Republic of Bulgaria) Hristo Bonev | 10 | 0 | 0 | 0 | 10 | 0 |
| — | MF | (Greece) Petros Karavitis | 20 | 6 | 2 | 0 | 22 | 6 |
| — | MF | (Greece) Christos Ardizoglou | 12 | 2 | 2 | 0 | 14 | 2 |
| — | MF | (Greece) Spyros Thodis | 24 | 2 | 3 | 0 | 27 | 2 |
| — | MF | (Greece) Dinos Ballis | 31 | 5 | 3 | 0 | 34 | 5 |
| — | MF | (Greece) Vangelis Vlachos | 25 | 4 | 2 | 0 | 27 | 4 |
Forwards
| — | FW | (Socialist Federal Republic of Yugoslavia) Mojaš Radonjić | 17 | 6 | 3 | 0 | 20 | 6 |
| — | FW | (Greece) Thomas Mavros | 30 | 16 | 2 | 2 | 32 | 18 |
| — | FW | (Greece) Giannis Dintsikos | 13 | 2 | 1 | 2 | 14 | 4 |
| — | FW | (Greece) Giorgos Chatziioannidis | 15 | 1 | 1 | 0 | 16 | 1 |
| — | FW | (Greece) Takis Karagiozopoulos | 17 | 1 | 1 | 0 | 18 | 1 |
| — | FW | (Greece) Panagiotis Angelidis | 3 | 0 | 1 | 0 | 4 | 0 |
Left during Winter Transfer Window
| — | FW | (Greece) Manolis Kottis | 3 | 0 | 0 | 0 | 3 | 0 |
| — | FW | (Greece) Thomas Stafylas | 0 | 0 | 0 | 0 | 0 | 0 |

=== Goalscorers ===
As of 30 May 1982
The list is sorted by competition order when total goals are equal, then by position and then alphabetically by surname.

| Rank | Pos. | Player | Alpha Ethniki | Greek Cup | Total |
|---|---|---|---|---|---|
| 1 | FW | (Greece) Thomas Mavros | 16 | 2 | 18 |
| 2 | MF | (Greece) Petros Karavitis | 6 | 0 | 6 |
| 2 | FW | (Socialist Federal Republic of Yugoslavia) Mojaš Radonjić | 6 | 0 | 6 |
| 4 | MF | (Greece) Dinos Ballis | 5 | 0 | 5 |
| 5 | DF | (Greece) Lysandros Georgamlis | 4 | 0 | 4 |
| 5 | MF | (Greece) Vangelis Vlachos | 4 | 0 | 4 |
| 5 | DF | (Greece) Lakis Nikolaou | 2 | 2 | 4 |
| 5 | FW | (Greece) Giannis Dintsikos | 2 | 2 | 4 |
| 9 | DF | (Greece) Giannis Mousouris | 2 | 0 | 2 |
| 9 | MF | (Greece) Spyros Thodis | 2 | 0 | 2 |
| 9 | MF | (Greece) Christos Ardizoglou | 2 | 0 | 2 |
| 12 | DF | (Greece) Stavros Letsas | 1 | 0 | 1 |
| 12 | FW | (Greece) Giorgos Chatziioannidis | 1 | 0 | 1 |
| 12 | FW | (Greece) Takis Karagiozopoulos | 1 | 0 | 1 |
| Own goals | | | 0 | 0 | 0 |
| Totals | | | 54 | 6 | 60 |

=== Clean sheets ===
As of 30 May 1982
The list is sorted by competition order when total clean sheets are equal and then alphabetically by surname. Clean sheets in games where both goalkeepers participated are awarded to the goalkeeper who started the game. Goalkeepers with no appearances are not included.

| Rank | Player | Alpha Ethniki | Greek Cup | Total |
|---|---|---|---|---|
| 1 | (Greece) Nikos Christidis | 8 | 0 | 8 |
| 2 | (Greece) Spyros Ikonomopoulos | 4 | 0 | 4 |
| 3 | (Greece) Lakis Stergioudas | 0 | 0 | 0 |
| Totals | | 12 | 0 | 12 |

=== Disciplinary record ===
As of 30 May 1982

| N | P | Nat. | Name | Alpha Ethniki | | | Greek Cup | | | Total | | | Notes |
| N | P | Nat. | Name | Yellow card | Second yellow card | Red card | Yellow card | Second yellow card | Red card | Yellow card | Second yellow card | Red card | Notes |
Goalkeepers
| — | GK | (Greece) | Nikos Christidis | | | | | | | | | | |
| — | GK | (Greece) | Lakis Stergioudas | | | | | | | | | | |
| — | GK | (Greece) | Spyros Ikonomopoulos | | | | | | | | | | |
Defenders
| — | DF | (Greece) | Lakis Nikolaou | | | | | | | | | | |
| — | DF | (Greece) | Giannis Mousouris | | | | | | | | | | |
| — | DF | (Greece) | Giorgos Rigas | | | | | | | | | | |
| — | DF | (Greece) | Michalis Tzirakis | 2 | | | | | | 2 | | | |
| — | DF | (Greece) | Petros Ravousis | 1 | | | | | | 1 | | | |
| — | DF | (Greece) | Vangelis Paraprastanitis | 2 | | | | | | 2 | | | |
| — | DF | (Greece) | Stavros Letsas | | | | | | | | | | |
| — | DF | (Greece) | Panagiotis Stylianopoulos | 3 | 1 | | | | | 3 | 1 | | |
| — | DF | (Greece) | Stelios Manolas | 2 | | | | | | 2 | | | |
| — | DF | (Greece) | Lysandros Georgamlis | 2 | | | | | | 2 | | | |
Midfielders
| — | MF | (People's Republic of Bulgaria) | Hristo Bonev | | | | | | | | | | |
| — | MF | (Greece) | Petros Karavitis | 3 | | 2 | 1 | | | 4 | | 2 | |
| — | MF | (Greece) | Christos Ardizoglou | | | | 1 | | | 1 | | | |
| — | MF | (Greece) | Spyros Thodis | 1 | | 1 | | | | 1 | | 1 | |
| — | MF | (Greece) | Dinos Ballis | 1 | | | 1 | | | 2 | | | |
| — | MF | (Greece) | Vangelis Vlachos | 3 | | | | | | 3 | | | |
Forwards
| — | FW | (Socialist Federal Republic of Yugoslavia) | Mojaš Radonjić | 2 | | 1 | | | | 2 | | 1 | |
| — | FW | (Greece) | Thomas Mavros | 1 | | | 1 | | | 2 | | | |
| — | FW | (Greece) | Giannis Dintsikos | | | | | | | | | | |
| — | FW | (Greece) | Giorgos Chatziioannidis | 2 | | | | | | 2 | | | |
| — | FW | (Greece) | Takis Karagiozopoulos | 2 | | | | | | 2 | | | |
| — | FW | (Greece) | Panagiotis Angelidis | | | | | | | | | | |
Left during Winter Transfer Window
| — | FW | (Greece) | Manolis Kottis | | | | | | | | | | |
| — | FW | (Greece) | Thomas Stafylas | | | | | | | | | | |

=== Starting 11 ===
This section presents the most frequently used formation along with the players with the most starts across all competitions.

| N. | Formation | Matchday(s) |
|---|---|---|
| 23 | 4–4–2 | 13–34 |
| 13 | 4–3–3 | 1–12 |

| Nat. | Player | Pos. |
|---|---|---|
| (Greece) | Nikos Christidis | GK |
| (Greece) | Stelios Manolas | RCB |
| (Greece) | Lakis Nikolaou (C) | LCB |
| (Greece) | Panagiotis Stylianopoulos | RB |
| (Greece) | Vangelis Paraprastanitis | LB |
| (Greece) | Lysandros Georgamlis | DM |
| (Greece) | Spyros Thodis | CM |
| (Greece) | Dinos Ballis | RM |
| (Greece) | Vangelis Vlachos | LM |
| (Socialist Federal Republic of Yugoslavia) | Mojaš Radonjić | RCF |
| (Greece) | Thomas Mavros | LCF |

Last updated: 1982-05-30
