= Nea Chalkidona =

Nea Chalkidona Νέα Χαλκηδόνα
- Municipal unit
- Location within Central Athens regional unit

- Location within Greece
- Coordinates: 38°1.7′N 23°43.8′E
- Country: Greece
- Administrative region: Attica
- Regional unit: Central Athens
- Municipality: Nea Filadelfeia-Nea Chalkidona

Area
  - Municipal unit: 0.800 km^{2} (0.309 sq mi)
- Elevation: 100 m (330 ft)

Population (2021)
  - Municipal unit: 9,760
  - Municipal unit density: 12,200/km^{2} (31,600/sq mi)
- Time zone: UTC+2 (EET)
  - Summer (DST): UTC+3 (EEST)
- Postal code: 143 xx
- Area code: 210
- Vehicle registration: Z
- Website: https://www.dimosfx.gr

Nea Chalkidona (Greek: Νέα Χαλκηδόνα, meaning New Chalcedon) is a town and a suburb in the Athens agglomeration, Greece. Since the 2011 local government reform it is part of the municipality Nea Filadelfeia-Nea Chalkidona, of which it is a municipal unit.

Nea Chalkidona is an inner suburb of Athens, located 5 km north of the city centre. Its built-up area is continuous with that of municipalities of Athens and the surrounding suburbs Agioi Anargyroi and Nea Filadelfeia. At 0.80 km^{2} it is the smallest municipal unit in the Athens metropolitan area. The A1 motorway (Athens–Thessaloniki–Evzonoi) and Greek National Road 1 pass through Nea Chalkidona. The nearest metro station is Ano Patisia metro station.

== Historical population ==
Year	Population
1981	10,533
1991	9,533
2001	10,112
2011	9,822
2021	9,760

== See also ==
- List of municipalities of Attica
