= Nea Filadelfeia-Nea Chalkidona =

Nea Filadelfeia-Nea Chalkidona Νέα Φιλαδέλφεια-Νέα Χαλκηδόνα
- Municipality
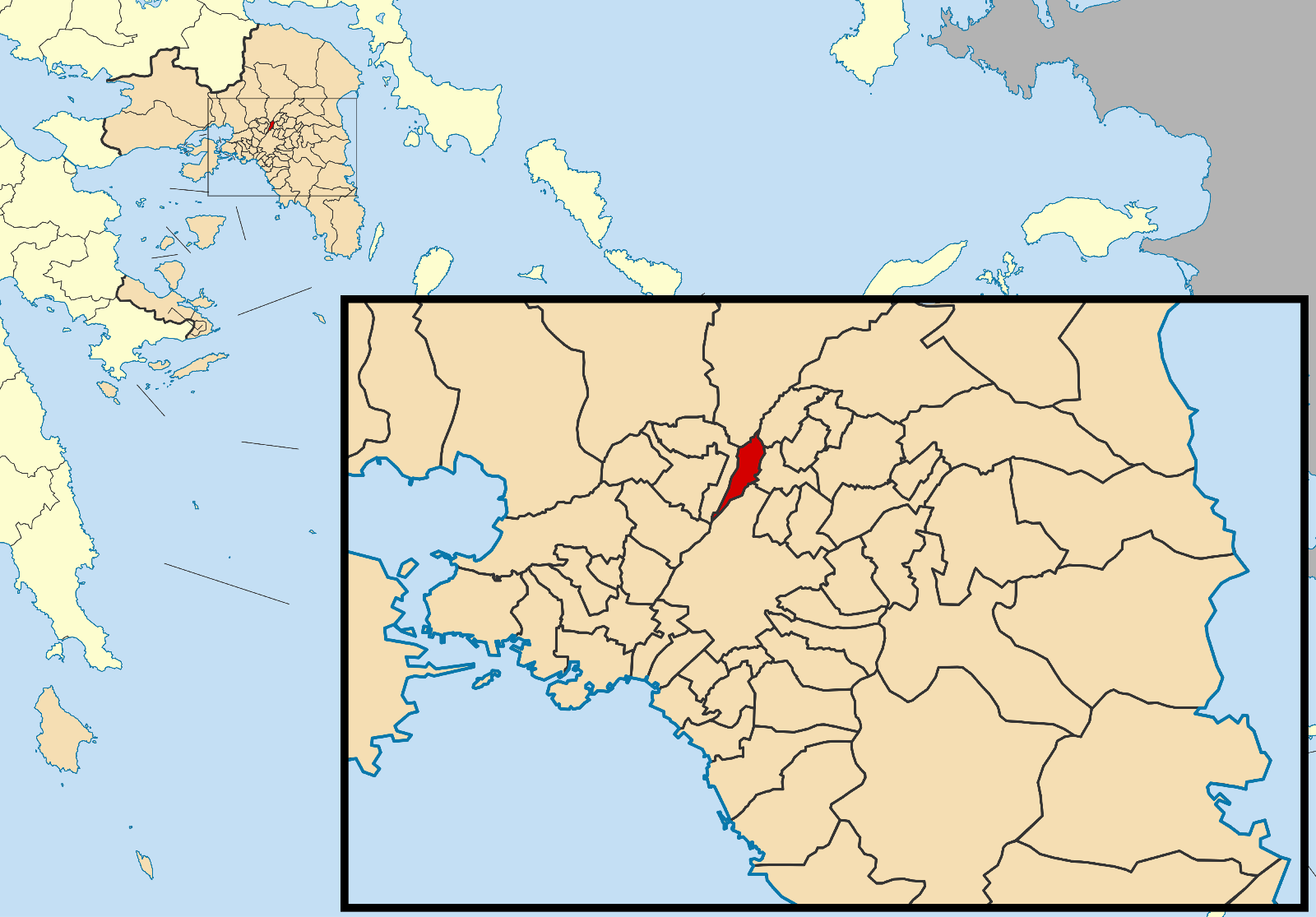

- Location within Greece
- Coordinates: 38°02′N 23°42′E
- Country: Greece
- Administrative region: Attica
- Regional unit: Central Athens

Government
  - Mayor: Ioannis Tompouloglou (since 2023)

Area
  - Municipality: 3.65 km^{2} (1.41 sq mi)

Population (2021)
  - Municipality: 34,958
  - Density: 9,580/km^{2} (24,800/sq mi)
- Time zone: UTC+2 (EET)
  - Summer (DST): UTC+3 (EEST)
- Website: dimosfx.gr

Nea Filadelfeia-Nea Chalkidona (Greek: Νέα Φιλαδέλφεια-Νέα Χαλκηδόνα, before 2017: Filadelfeia-Chalkidona) is a municipality in the Central Athens regional unit, Attica, Greece. The seat of the municipality is the town Nea Filadelfeia. The municipality has an area of 3.650 km^{2}.

== Municipality ==
The municipality Nea Filadelfeia–Nea Chalkidona was formed at the 2011 local government reform by the merger of the following 2 former municipalities, that became municipal units:

- Nea Chalkidona
- Nea Filadelfeia
