= Albert Kanta Kambala =

Congolese footballer (1958–2008)

Kanta Kambala
Personal information
- Full name: Albert Kanta Kambala
- Date of birth: 25 May 1958
- Place of birth: Élisabethville, Belgian Congo
- Date of death: 10 July 2008 (aged 50)
- Place of death: Kikwit, Democratic Republic of the Congo
- Height: 1.77 m (5 ft 10 in)
- Position: Midfielder

Senior career*
Years	Team	Apps	(Gls)
–1981	TP Mazembe		
1981–1983	Rodos	14	(0)
- * Club domestic league appearances and goals

Albert Kanta Kambala (25 May 1958 – 10 July 2008) was a Zaire international footballer, who played as a midfielder.

== Club career ==
Born in Élisabethville (now Lubumbashi, Democratic Republic of the Congo) Kanta Kambala began his career with TP Mazembe. He moved to play in the Greek first division at the age of 23, signing with Rodos F.C. for two seasons. He would finish his playing career in Belgium and receive his UEFA Pro License from the school in Heysel.

== Managerial career ==
He managed several football clubs in Democratic Republic of the Congo, including Daring Club Motema Pembe, AS Vita Club, AS Dragons, SC Cilu, AS Kabasha, OC Bukavu Dawa and FC Makila Mabe.

== Death ==
Kanta Kambala died at a hospital in Kikwit at age 50.
