= Panikos Hatziloizou =

Cypriot footballer

Personal information
- Full name: Panikos Hatziloizou
- Date of birth: 30 September 1959 (age 67)
- Place of birth: Cyprus
- Positions: Forward; midfielder

Youth career
- 1974–1977: Aris Limassol

Senior career*
Years	Team	Apps	(Gls)
1974–1979	Aris Limassol		
1979–1980	AEK Athens	9	(0)
1980	→ Atromitos (loan)	0	(0)
1980–1991	Aris Limassol		
1993–1995	Apollon Limassol		

International career
1979	Cyprus U21	2	(0)
1982–1989	Cyprus	7	(0)

Managerial career
- 2013–2014: Aris Limassol
- * Club domestic league appearances and goals

Panikos Hatziloizou (Greek: Πανίκος Χατζηλοΐζου; born 30 September 1959) is a Cypriot former professional footballer who played as a forward or as a midfielder.

== Club career ==
Hatziloizou started football at Aris Limassol in 1974 as a teenager and he impressed with the fluency he showed in scoring and in general with his attacking skills. In 1977 he was spotted by people who were researching the Cypriot market for footballers on behalf of AEK Athens and belonged mainly to the environment of the Cypriot shipowner Vasos Chatziioannou, a close associate in the administration of Loukas Barlos. Thus at the age of 18, he went to Nea Filadelfeia for a try out. Even though the manager of the club, František Fadrhonc spoke flatteringly of his worth, the young Hatziloizou, after the try out with the AEK, returned to Cyprus to serve his military service. When his service was nearing its completion, the people who were watching him brought him back to Athens in mid-August 1979 and placed him under the protection of Nikos Stratos, while he trained daily under the supervision of Fadrhonc. A week later, the president of Aris Limassol, Alekos Prattis, arrived in Athens and on 16 August 1979, the transfer of Hatziloizou to AEK was completed in the office of Barlos, with AEK paying the sum of 3,000,000 drachmas.

AEK at the time was filled with a many stars and the competition for a place in the main squad was very tough. Despite some good performances in friendly matches, Hatziloizou did not manage to establish himself in the team and combined with the misfortune of some minor injuries, at the end of the season he left the yellow-blacks. In the following summer he was loaned to Atromitos alongside Panagiotis Stylianopoulos. Ηe managed to participate only in the preparation of the team, competing only in friendly matches, since in September, during the first matchdays of the championship, he decided to terminate his loan and return to Cyprus and Aris Limassol. In his second spell at Aris he emerged as the top scorer of the Cypriot First Division in 1983 with 17 goals. At the beginning of the season he almost created a feud between his club and APOEL, when he signed a transfer form twice and withdrew it. He played at Aris until 1991. The last stop of his career was Apollon Limassol, where he played from 1993 to 1995 winning the league in 1994.

== International career ==
Hatziloizou having been international with all the departments, he played with Cyprus and made 7 appearances, which was an important number, at a time when the competition was very intense with the clubs of Nicosia, mainly, having several players in the starting eleventh the team.

== After football ==
After his retirement from as a footballer, Hatziloizou became involved in coaching, collaborating in various coaching positions with Aris Limassol, most recently as the head of the team's academies.

== Honours ==
Apollon Limassol

- Cypriot First Division: 1993–94

Individual

- Cypriot First Division top scorer: 1982–83
