= Nikos Moulatsiotis =

Greek footballer and coach

Nikos Moulatsiotis (Greek: Νίκος Μουλατσιώτης) is a Greek footballer (soccer player) and a coach. He played in the 1970s in the first and second divisions with Kalamata and Panachaiki.

== Club career ==
Nikos Moulatsiotis was born in Kalamata, in which he began his soccer career in 1970. He became basic and in 1972 he took the Second Division championship. In the 1972–73 season, he was elevated to the first division. At the end of the season, Kalamata was relegated but in 1974, once again he took the title and the entry from the Second Division. He played for another season at the highest division and once again to the second.

Moulatsiotis remained in the club of his family for another two seasons, but did not try to re-enter the first division but entered the Third Division instead. In 1977, he traded to Panachaiki in which he tried with other players in Kalamata which played for three seasons with success. Later on, he ended his career in Kalamata.

When he finished playing soccer, he became a coach for different clubs in the Messinia FCA. His important success was when his player presented into the ice of Asteras Arfara between 2006 and 2008 in which it tried to finish in 6th and 7th place in the Fourth Division. In 2000, he coached again with Asteras and won the Messinia Cup.

== Career ==
=== Player statistics ===
| Years | Clubs | Apps | Goals |
|---|---|---|---|
| from 1972 | Kalamata | Beta Ethniki |
| 1972-73 | Kalamata | 16 | 2 |
| 1973-74 | Kalamata | Second Division |
| 1974-75 | Kalamata | 30 | 0 |
| 1975 to 1977 | Kalamata | Kalamata | Second Division |
| 1977-78 | Panachaiki | 16 | 0 |
| 1978-79 | Panachaiki | 18 | 0 |
| 1979-80 | Panachaiki | 11 | 0 |
| 1980-? | Kalamata |
| TOTAL | Alpha Ethniki | 91 | 2 |
| TOTAL | Beta Ethniki |

=== Coach roles ===
- Asteras Arfara: 2000, 2006–2008
- Panionios Kalamata: 2008-09
- Methoni FC: 2009-10

== Titles ==
- Beta Ethniki: (2): 1971–72, 1973–74 (as a player)
- Messinia Cup: 2000 (as a coach)
