= Christos Apostolidis =

Greek footballer and manager

Personal information
- Date of birth: 6 August 1952 (age 73)
- Place of birth: Vathi, Kilkis, Greece
- Position: Wing back

Christos Apostolidis (Greek: Χρήστος Αποστολίδης; born on 6 August 1952) is a former Greek footballer (wing back) and coach.

== Club career ==
He started his career as an amateur in A.O. Keravnos Vathis and Kilkisiakos. He later played professionally for Ethnikos Piraeus before being transferred to Panachaiki in the 1976–77 season. He stayed in Patras until the mid-eighties.

== Statistics ==
Christos Apostolidis had 177 First Division appearances for Panachaiki and scored 20 goals.
