= Markos Mavromatis =

Greek footballer

Personal information
- Date of birth: 5 June 1958 (age 68)
- Place of birth: Athens, Greece
- Height: 1.74 m (5 ft 9 in)
- Position: Midfielder

Senior career*
Years	Team	Apps	(Gls)
1976–1985	Apollon Smyrnis		
1985–1986	Atromitos		
1986–1988	Egaleo		
1988–1989	Doxa Vyronas		

International career
1980	Greece	1	(0)

Managerial career
- 2002: Apollon Smyrnis
- 2003: Acharnaikos
- 2005: Vyzas
- 2006–2007: Vyzas
- 2007: Aiolikos
- 2008: Vyzas
- 2008–2009: Keravnos
- 2009: Panargiakos
- 2010: Vyzas
- 2010: Chania
- 2013–2015: A.E. Kifisia
- 2015: Ilisiakos
- 2016: Irakliou
- 2016–2018: A.E. Kifisia
- * Club domestic league appearances and goals

Markos Mavromatis (Greek: Μάρκος Μαυρομάτης; born 5 June 1958) is a Greek retired football midfielder and later manager.
