= Thanasis Papazoglou (footballer, born 1953) =

Greek footballer (1953–2021)

Personal information
- Full name: Athanasios Papazoglou
- Date of birth: 15 March 1953
- Date of death: 6 January 2021 (aged 67)
- Position: Defender

Senior career*
| Years | Team | Apps | (Gls) |
| 1972–1977 | Aris | | |
| 1977–1985 | PAS Giannina | 215 | |
| 1985–1989 | Trikala | | |

International career
| 1981 | Greece | 2 | (0) |
- * Club domestic league appearances and goals

Thanasis Papazoglou (Greek: Θανάσης Παπάζογλου (15 March 1953 – 6 January 2021) was a Greek football defender.
