= FC Makila Mabe =

FC Makila Mabe is a football club in Kikwit, Democratic Republic of Congo. They play in the Linafoot, the top level of professional football in DR Congo.

== Achievements ==
- Bandundu Provincial League: 2

2005, 2006
