= Dimitris Argyros =

Greek footballer

Personal information
- Full name: Dimitrios Argyros
- Date of birth: 6 December 1948
- Place of birth: Naousa, Greece
- Date of death: 5 November 2022 (aged 73)
- Place of death: Kastoria, Greece
- Position: Defender

Senior career*
Years	Team	Apps	(Gls)
1966–1974	Naoussa		
1974–1979	Kastoria	148	(7)
1979–1980	AEK Athens	7	(0)
1980–1981	Kastoria	4	(0)
Total		159	(7)
- * Club domestic league appearances and goals

Dimitris "Τakis" Argyros (Greek: Δημήτρης "Τάκης" Αργυρός; 6 December 1948 – 5 November 2022) was a Greek professional footballer who played as a defender.

== Club career ==
Argyros started his football career at Naoussa. He was a harsh centre-back, who could easily compete at the position of sweeper, as well. In the summer of 1974, during the days of the then conscription, he was transferred to Kastoria. He quickly established himself at the team of Kastoria and in his first season he competed in all 34 games of the championship. He spent a total of five seasons at the club and he distinguished himself in the league.

On 6 August 1979, despite his relatively advanced age of 31, Argyros was transferred to the then champions, AEK Athens, who paid 7 million drachmas to acquire him. He was mainly used as a back-up option in the center of the defense, behind Lakis Nikolaou and Petros Ravousis. On 19 September 1979 he made his only appearance in the European Cup in an away 3–0 defeat against Argeș Pitești. He also competed as a left-back, a position he was used in the entire play-off match for the 3rd place against Panathinaikos on 24 May 1980, where they lost by 1–0. His limited time of participation fell even further with the promotion of the promising defender, Stelios Manolas. In the following season he failed to make any appearances with the yellow-blacks, which resulted his departure on 15 December 1980 and his eventual return to Kastoria, where he ended his football career.

== Personal life ==
Argyros was active citizen and he was repeatedly involved in politics and the local government. He died at 5 November 2022.
