= Nea Filadelfeia =

Nea Filadelfeia Νέα Φιλαδέλφεια
- Municipal unit
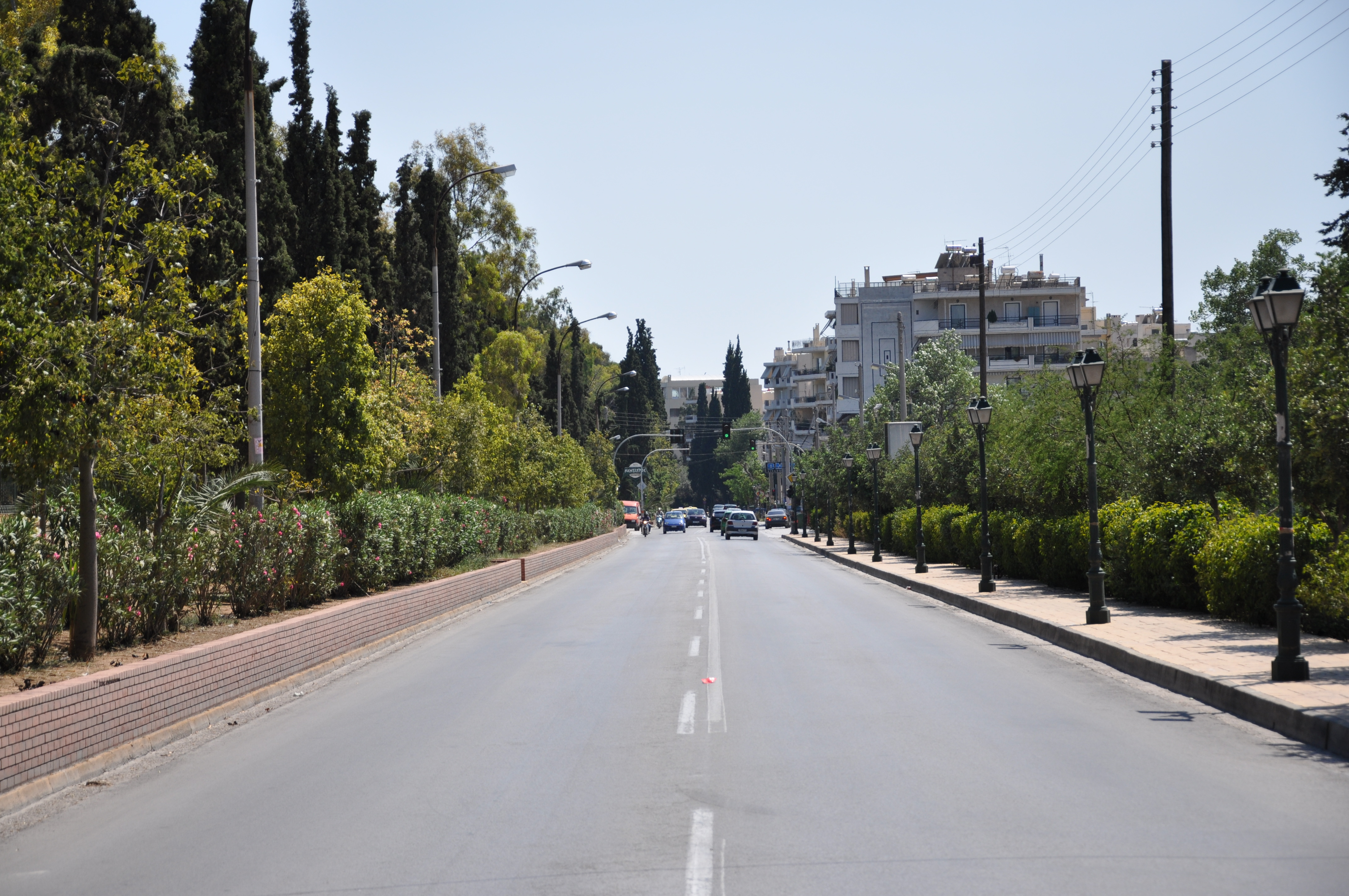
- Dekelias Ave

- Location within the Central Athens regional unit

- Location within Greece
- Coordinates: 38°2.2′N 23°44.2′E
- Country: Greece
- Administrative region: Attica
- Regional unit: Central Athens
- Municipality: Nea Filadelfeia-Nea Chalkidona

Area
  - Municipal unit: 2.850 km^{2} (1.100 sq mi)
- Elevation: 110 m (360 ft)

Population (2021)
  - Municipal unit: 25,198
  - Municipal unit density: 8,841/km^{2} (22,900/sq mi)
- Time zone: UTC+2 (EET)
  - Summer (DST): UTC+3 (EEST)
- Postal code: 143 xx
- Area code: 210
- Vehicle registration: Z
- Website: www.dimosfx.gr

Nea Filadelfeia (Greek: Νέα Φιλαδέλφεια, meaning New Philadelphia) is a town and a suburb of the Athens agglomeration, Greece. Since the 2011 local government reform, it has been part of Nea Filadelfeia-Nea Chalkidona municipality of Central Athens regional unit, of which it is the seat and a municipal unit. The municipal unit has an area of 2.850 km^{2}. It was named after the Anatolian city Filadelfeia, now Alaşehir in Turkey, and it was settled by Greek refugees from Asia Minor after the Greco-Turkish War (1919-1922).

== Geography ==
Nea Filadelfeia is a suburb of Athens, located 6 km (4 mi) north of the city centre. Its built-up area is continuous with the municipality of Athens and the surrounding suburbs Nea Chalkidona, Agioi Anargyroi, Acharnes, Metamorfosi and Nea Ionia. The A1 motorway (Athens - Thessaloniki) and Greek National Road 1 pass through the town. The main throughfare off the town is Dekelias Avenue, which runs from Nea Chalkidona all the way to the border with Metamorfosi Nea Filadelfeia has a large park, Alsos Neas Filadelfias, which covers 0.48 square kilometres (0.19 sq mi). The park formerly hosted a zoo which operated since 1955 to 1995. Nea Filadelfeia is located at the geographical center of the Attica peninsula, around 13 km from the sea.

== Education ==
Nea Filadelfeia has 9 primary schools, 4 secondary schools (one of them is athletic type) and 3 high schools. Among them is the 3rd High School of Nea Filadelfia "Miltos Kountouras".

== Sports ==
Nea Filadelfeia is the historical home of AEK, a major Greek Multi-Sports Club established in 1924 in Nea Filadelfeia. It is also the home of Ionikos Nea Filadelfeia. The now demolished Nikos Goumas Stadium was the home ground of AEK Athens F.C. from 1930 to 2003, while the Agia Sophia Stadium is the new home ground since 2022. The Ionikos Nea Filadelfeia sports club is renowned in Greece and abroad for its handball, volleyball and basketball achievements.

Nea Filadelfeia is also the birthplace of the Greek-Australian football coach Ange Postecoglou.

Sport clubs based in Nea Filadelfeia
Club	Founded	Sports	Achievements
A.E.K. (sports club)	1924	Football, Basketball, Volleyball, Handball, Futsal and other	One of the most successful Greek clubs with many domestic and Europeans titles
Ionikos Nea Filadelfeia	1930	Basketball, Volleyball, Handball and other	Panhellenic titles in volleyball and handball
FEA Filadelfeia/Chalkidona	1989	Basketball	Earlier presence in A1 Ethniki women

== Historical population ==
Year	Population
1981	25,320
1991	25,261
2001	24,112
2011	25,734
2021	25,198

== Climate ==
Nea Filadelfeia has a hot-summer Mediterranean climate (Csa). The area is notorious in Greece for its summer heat; according to the Hellenic National Meteorological Service (HNMS) it registers Greece's highest mean maximum summer temperatures for the period 1955-1997. On 26 June 2007, during the 2007 European heat wave, Nea Filadelfeia recorded 46.2 °C (115.2 °F) while, on the same day, the nearby automatic HNMS weather station recorded 47.5 °C (117.5 °F), which is Europe's highest June temperature to date.

Climate data for Nea Filadelfeia AWS (Central Athens) , Hellenic National Meteorological Service (2006-2024), Extremes (1955-today)
Month	Jan	Feb	Mar	Apr	May	Jun	Jul	Aug	Sep	Oct	Nov	Dec	Year
Record high °C (°F)	23.4 (74.1)	25.8 (78.4)	29.3 (84.7)	32.2 (90.0)	40.6 (105.1)	47.5 (117.5)	46.2 (115.2)	45.3 (113.5)	39.9 (103.8)	38.2 (100.8)	28.6 (83.5)	22.6 (72.7)	47.5 (117.5)
Mean daily maximum °C (°F)	13.7 (56.7)	15.3 (59.5)	17.8 (64.0)	22.6 (72.7)	28.1 (82.6)	33.1 (91.6)	35.5 (95.9)	35.3 (95.5)	30.6 (87.1)	24.6 (76.3)	20.2 (68.4)	15.2 (59.4)	24.3 (75.8)
Daily mean °C (°F)	9.5 (49.1)	10.8 (51.4)	12.8 (55.0)	16.9 (62.4)	21.7 (71.1)	26.3 (79.3)	28.6 (83.5)	28.7 (83.7)	24.6 (76.3)	19.7 (67.5)	15.6 (60.1)	11.1 (52.0)	18.9 (66.0)
Mean daily minimum °C (°F)	5.2 (41.4)	6.3 (43.3)	7.8 (46.0)	11.1 (52.0)	15.3 (59.5)	19.6 (67.3)	21.8 (71.2)	22.2 (72.0)	18.6 (65.5)	14.8 (58.6)	11.0 (51.8)	7.0 (44.6)	13.4 (56.1)
Record low °C (°F)	−5.8 (21.6)	−5.4 (22.3)	−4.6 (23.7)	0.0 (32.0)	6.0 (42.8)	9.0 (48.2)	14.0 (57.2)	13.8 (56.8)	7.8 (46.0)	4.6 (40.3)	−1.1 (30.0)	−4.4 (24.1)	−5.8 (21.6)
Average precipitation mm (inches)	53.9 (2.12)	43.0 (1.69)	41.8 (1.65)	28.5 (1.12)	20.5 (0.81)	9.1 (0.36)	7.0 (0.28)	6.7 (0.26)	19.4 (0.76)	48.8 (1.92)	61.9 (2.44)	71.2 (2.80)	411.8 (16.21)
Source 1: Nea Filadelfeia AWS (Jan 2006-Aug 2024), World Meteorological Organization
Source 2: Extremes (1955-today), Precipitation (1955-2010)

Climate data for Nea Filadelfeia, Hellenic National Meteorological Service (1955–2010)
Month	Jan	Feb	Mar	Apr	May	Jun	Jul	Aug	Sep	Oct	Nov	Dec	Year
Mean daily maximum °C (°F)	12.6 (54.7)	13.6 (56.5)	16.0 (60.8)	20.3 (68.5)	26.2 (79.2)	31.4 (88.5)	33.8 (92.8)	33.6 (92.5)	29.2 (84.6)	23.5 (74.3)	18.1 (64.6)	14.1 (57.4)	22.7 (72.9)
Daily mean °C (°F)	8.8 (47.8)	9.3 (48.7)	11.3 (52.3)	15.3 (59.5)	21.0 (69.8)	26.0 (78.8)	28.3 (82.9)	27.8 (82.0)	23.4 (74.1)	18.4 (65.1)	13.7 (56.7)	10.2 (50.4)	17.8 (64.0)
Mean daily minimum °C (°F)	5.4 (41.7)	5.5 (41.9)	6.9 (44.4)	9.9 (49.8)	14.2 (57.6)	18.7 (65.7)	21.3 (70.3)	21.2 (70.2)	17.6 (63.7)	13.8 (56.8)	10.0 (50.0)	6.9 (44.4)	12.6 (54.7)
Average precipitation mm (inches)	53.9 (2.12)	43.0 (1.69)	41.8 (1.65)	28.5 (1.12)	20.5 (0.81)	9.1 (0.36)	7.0 (0.28)	6.7 (0.26)	19.4 (0.76)	48.8 (1.92)	61.9 (2.44)	71.2 (2.80)	411.8 (16.21)
Source: Nea Filadelfeia SYNOPTIC

=== Highest temperatures recorded ===
Below a list of the highest temperatures ever recorded in Nea Filadelfeia, Athens.

Temperature	Station	Date Recorded
47.5 °C (117.5 °F)	Nea Filadelfeia (AWS HNMS)	June 26, 2007
46.2 °C (115.2 °F)	Nea Filadelfeia (AWS HNMS)	July 25, 2007
46.2 °C (115.2 °F)	Nea Filadelfeia (SYNOPTIC HNMS)	June 26, 2007
45.4 °C (113.7 °F)	Nea Filadelfeia (AWS HNMS)	July 2, 2017
45.4 °C (113.7 °F)	Nea Filadelfeia (AWS HNMS)	July 23, 2023
45.3 °C (113.5 °F)	Nea Filadelfeia (AWS HNMS)	August 3, 2021
45.1 °C (113.2 °F)	Nea Filadelfeia (AWS HNMS)	June 27, 2007
45.0 °C (113.0 °F)	Nea Filadelfeia (SYNOPTIC HNMS)	July 25, 2007
45.0 °C (113.0 °F)	Nea Filadelfeia (SYNOPTIC HNMS)	July 7, 1988

== Notable people ==
- Elena Nathanael, Greek actress
- Ange Postecoglou, former coach of the Australian national football team and former head coach of Celtic F.C., Tottenham Hotspur F.C. and Nottingham Forest F.C.

== Gallery ==
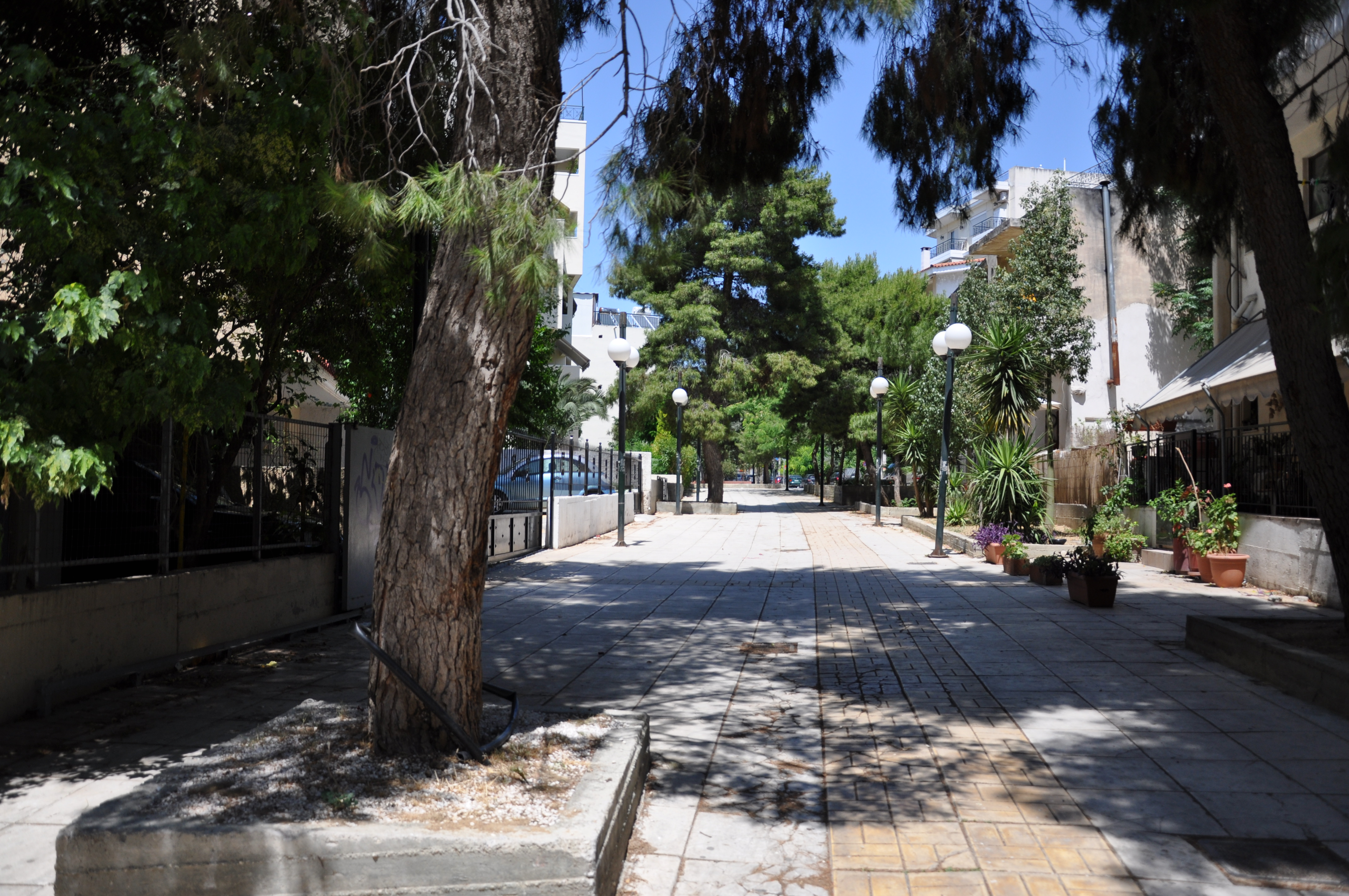
Lavriou street

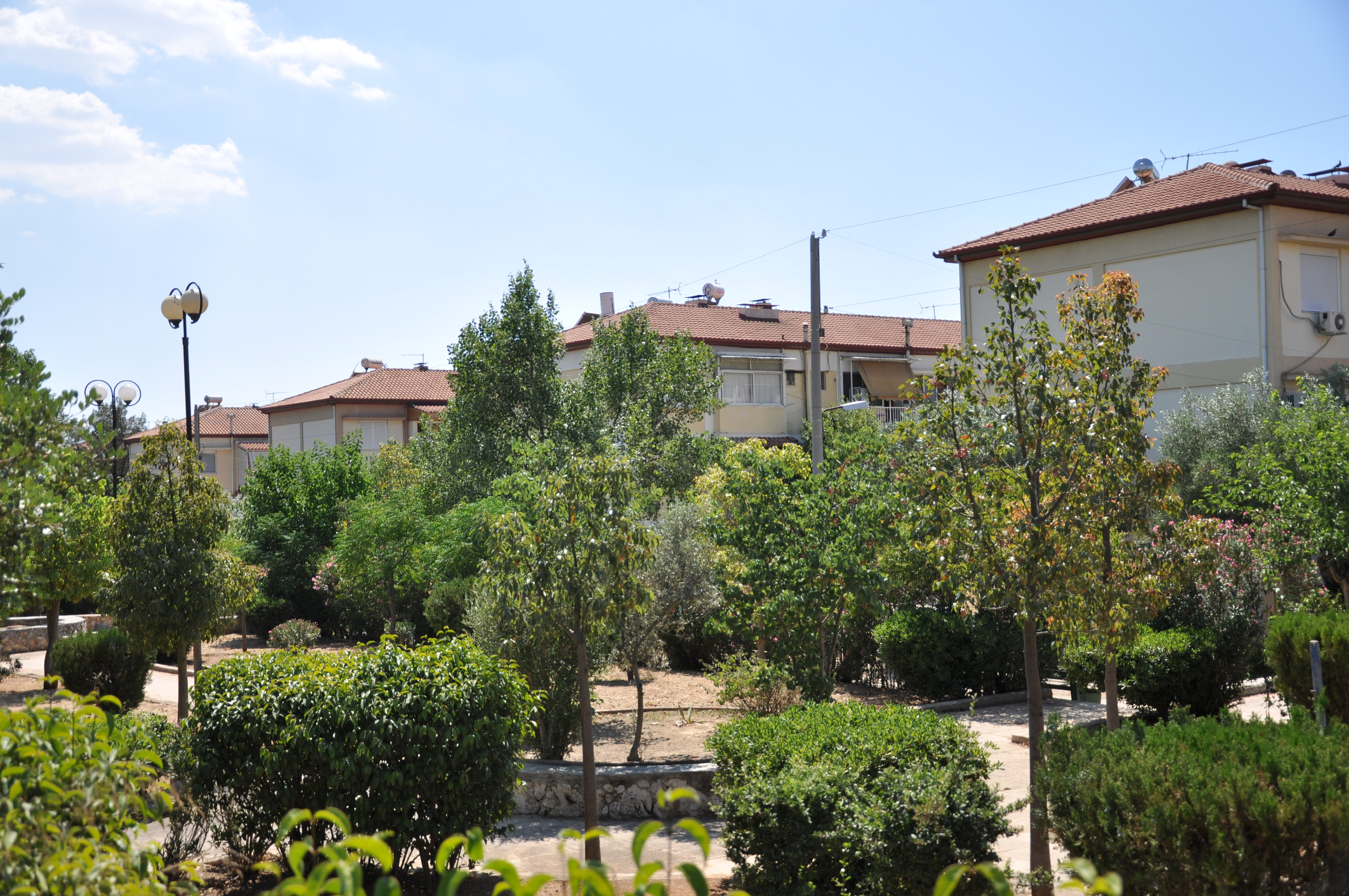
Typical workers cooperative housing

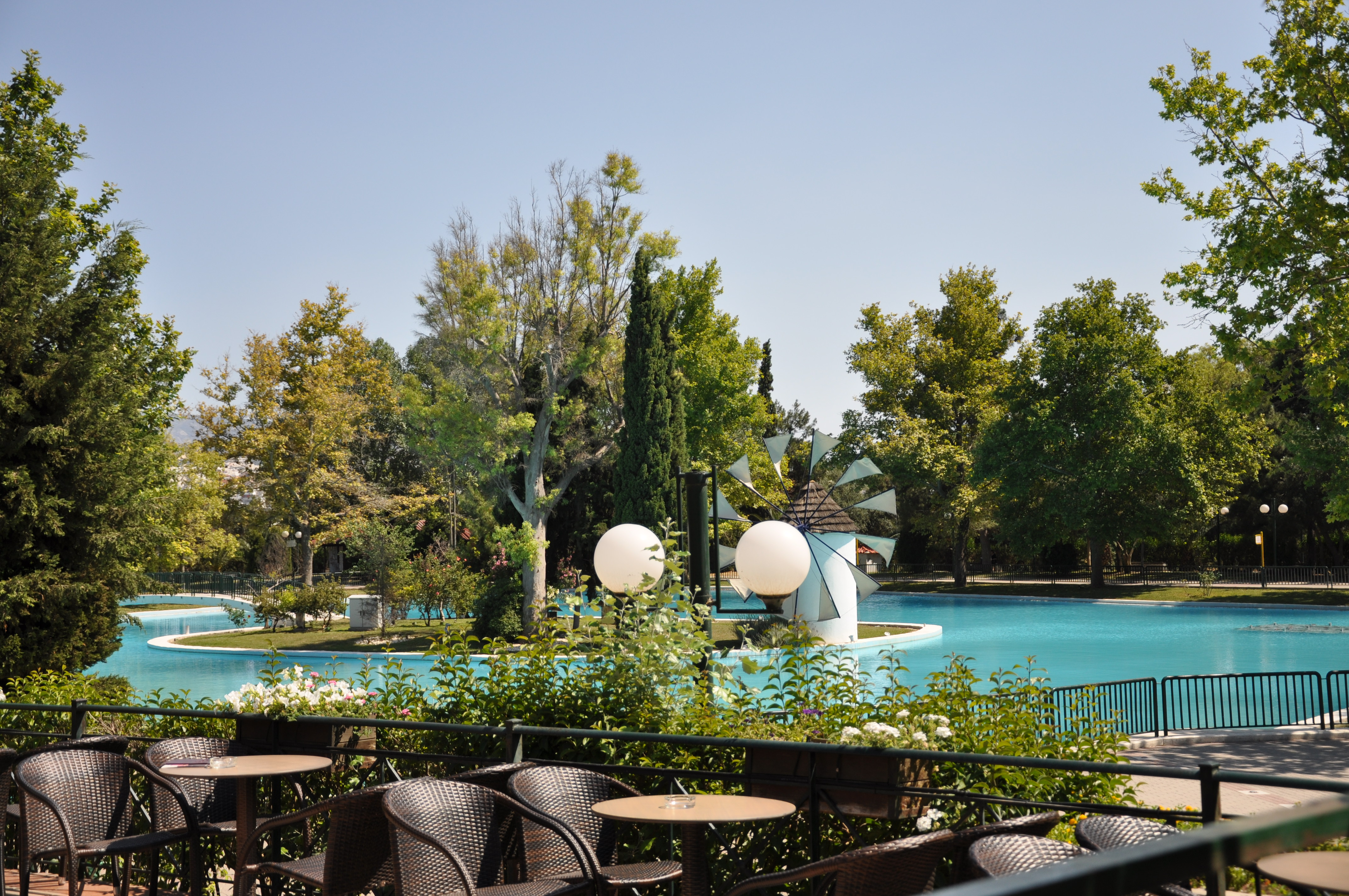
Artificial lake in the park of Nea Filadelfeia

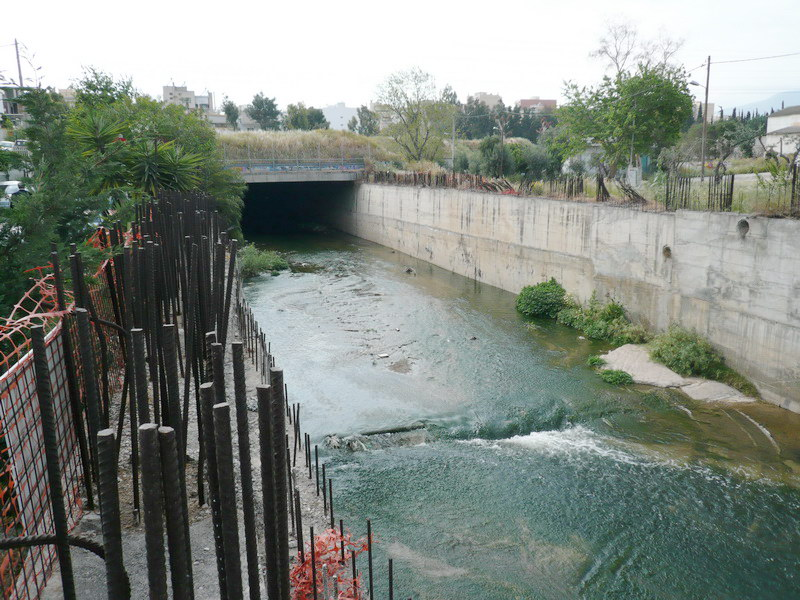
Kifisos river

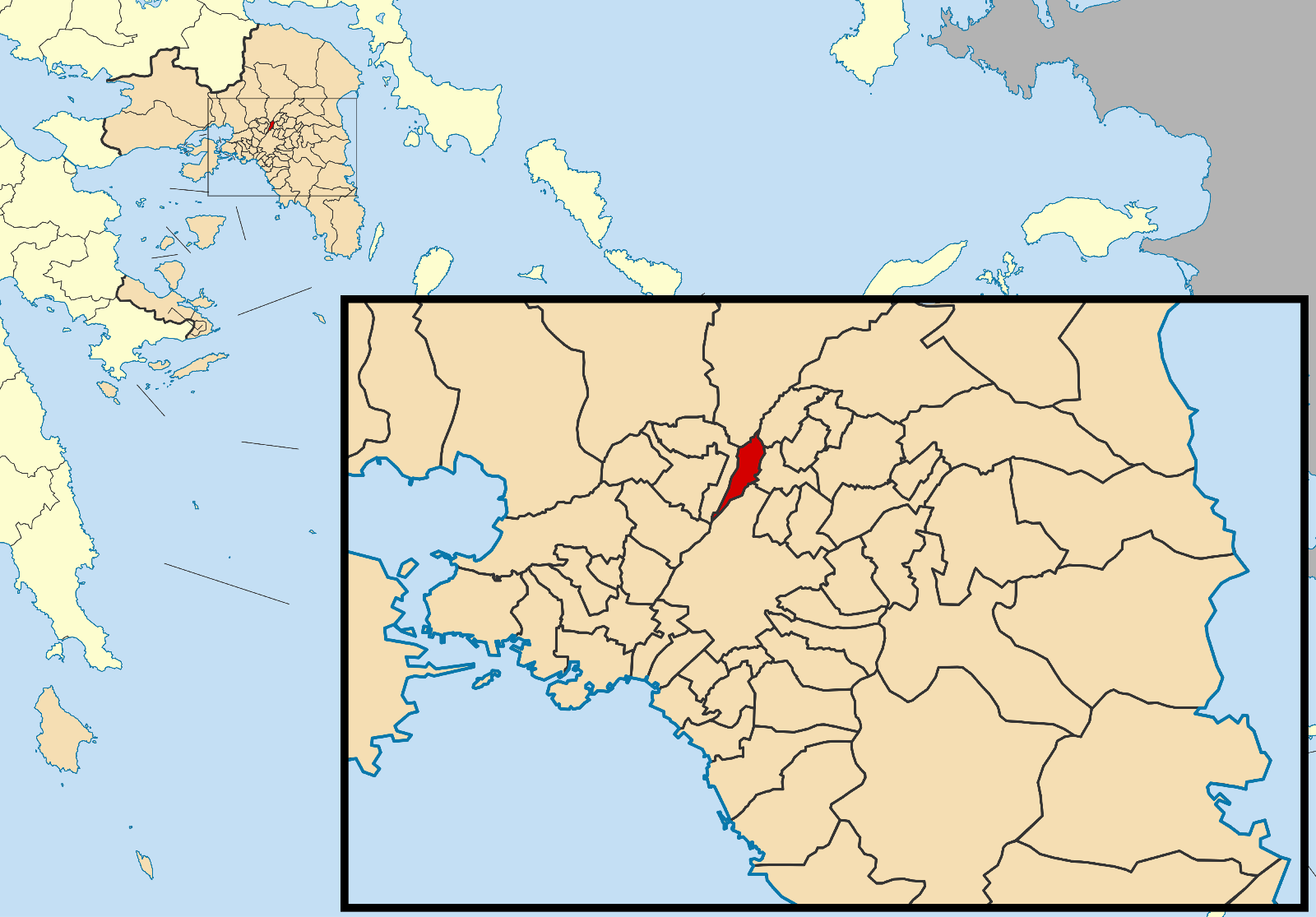
Nea Filadelfeia-Nea Chalkidona municipality

== See also ==
- Philadelphia, a city in the US state of Pennsylvania
- List of municipalities of Attica
