= Central Athens (regional unit) =

Central Athens Περιφερειακή ενότητα Κεντρικού Τομέα Αθηνών
- Regional unit
- Municipalities of Central Athens

- Central Athens within Greece

- Location within Greece
- Coordinates: 37°59′N 23°44′E
- Country: Greece
- Administrative region: Attica
- Seat: Athens

Area
  - Total: 87.4 km^{2} (33.7 sq mi)

Population (2021)
  - Total: 1,002,212
  - Density: 11,500/km^{2} (29,700/sq mi)
- Time zone: UTC+2 (EET)
  - Summer (DST): UTC+3 (EEST)
- Postal code: 12x xx, 13x xx
- Area code: 210

Central Athens (Greek: Κεντρικός Τομέας Αθηνών) is one of the regional units of Greece. It is part of the region of Attica. The regional unit covers the central part of the agglomeration of Greater Athens.

== Administration ==
As a part of the 2011 Kallikratis government reform, the regional unit Central Athens was created out of part of the former Athens Prefecture. It is subdivided into 8 municipalities. These are (number as in the map in the infobox):

- Municipality of Athens (Dimos Athinaion, 1)
- Dafni-Ymittos (2)
- Nea Filadelfeia-Nea Chalkidona (3)
- Galatsi (4)
- Ilioupoli (5)
- Kaisariani (6)
- Vyronas (7)
- Zografou (8)

== See also ==
- List of settlements in Attica
