= Giorgos Kalogeropoulos =

Greek footballer (born 1954)

Personal information
- Full name: Georgios Kalogeropoulos
- Date of birth: 14 September 1954 (age 72)
- Place of birth: Athens, Greece
- Height: 1.75 m (5 ft 9 in)
- Position: Left-back

Youth career
- –1972: Poseidon Glyfada
- 1972–1974: Panionios

Senior career*
Years	Team	Apps	(Gls)
1974–1979	Panionios	105	(0)
1979–1981	AEK Athens	14	(0)
1981–1982	OFI	0	(0)
1982–	Vyzas Megara		
Total		119	(0)
- * Club domestic league appearances and goals

Giorgos Kalogeropoulos (Greek: Γιώργος Καλογερόπουλος; born 14 September 1954) is a Greek former professional footballer who played as a left-back.

== Club career ==
Kalogeropoulos started his career at Poseidon Glyfada, before joining Panionios in 1972. In 1974 he was promoted to the senior team and in the following season he established himself as a regular on the left side of the team's defence. In the summer of 1979, following the arrival of the manager Siegfried Melzig, Kalogeropoulos was sidelined, which led to his release from the club in December. Thus, he signed for AEK Athens.

At AEK, he wasn't able to establish himself in the main squad due to the strong competition, while constant injuries kept him out of action. On 31 July 1981 he was released from the club and joined OFI. He wasn't able to establish himself in the squad either and in 1982 he moved to the second division side, Vyzas Megara.

== Personal life ==
In 2010 Kalogeropoulos moved to the city of Celje in Slovenia, where he lives alongside his son Vangelis, with the two being the city's only Greek residents.
