= 1977–78 AEK Athens F.C. season =

AEK Athens
1977–78 season
- Chairman: Loukas Barlos
- Manager: František Fadrhonc (until 23 September); Andreas Stamatiadis (interim, until 10 October); Zlatko Čajkovski
- Stadium: AEK Stadium
- Alpha Ethniki: 1st
- Greek Cup: Winners
- UEFA Cup: Second round
- Top goalscorer: League: Thomas Mavros (22); All: Thomas Mavros (31)
- Highest home attendance: 30,000 vs Olympiacos (17 May 1978)
- Lowest home attendance: 5,482 vs Ethnikos Piraeus (26 December 1977)
- Average home league attendance: 15,572
- Biggest win: Ethnikos Piraeus 1–6 AEK Athens; AEK Athens 6–1 AO Chania; AEK Athens 6–1 Olympiacos
- Biggest defeat: Standard Liège 4–1 AEK Athens
Home colours

The 1977–78 season was the 54th season in the existence of AEK Athens F.C. and the 19th consecutive season in the top flight of Greek football. They competed in the Alpha Ethniki, the Greek Cup and the UEFA Cup. The season began on 11 September 1977 and finished on 4 June 1978.

== Overview ==
AEK started the season on the back of their run to the previous season's UEFA Cup semi-finals, as well as the impressive football they had displayed throughout which reflected their determination to maintain the same level success. Loukas Barlos continued to strengthen the squad. The defender of Egaleo, Aris Damianidis, the Uruguayan midfielder Milton Viera from Olympiacos, the top scorer of last season's second division with AEL, Giannis Mousouris and most importantly the Yugoslav international striker, Dušan Bajević from Velež Mostar addressed the remaining weaknesses in the squad.

At the beginning of the season, tensions emerged between Barlos and Fadrhonc. Differences in football philosophy between the two men regarding the club's future became apparent, as Barlos wanted the strengthening of AEK with major singings, while the "grandfather" seemed to prefer the gradual strengthening of the squad through the club's academy, which he had under his supervision and had upgraded to a fairly high level.

Their differing philosophies ultimately led to Fadrhonc's dismissal after the away defeat against Olympiacos at the 2nd matchday. The Czech's assistant Andreas Stamatiadis served as interim manager for the next two games before the Yugoslav manager Zlatko Čajkovski was appointed. The so-called "Čik" as an ardent supporter of attractive attacking football, continued Fadrhonc's work and made excellent use of the squad.

In the UEFA Cup, AEK were drawn against the Romanian ASA Târgu Mureș, for the first round. AEK produced an underwhelming performance in Romania, which was largely due to the tragic condition of the pitch. It had rained heavily in the city for two consecutive days before the match, resulting in a waterlogged pitch. The Romanians took advantage of AEK's inability to display their technical ability on the pitch and not only did they defend effectively, but also won by 1–0. In the replay match, AEK were imposing and the match ended 3–0, while they lost many opportunities for more throughout the second half. In the second round, the draw paired AEK with Belgian side Standard Liège, which proved to be a difficult opponent and earned a draw at AEK stadium. The second leg began poorly for AEK, as they were left behind 1–0 by an own goal. The yellow-blacks managed to recover from the shock and they levelled the score, but the final half-hour saw AEK run out of energy and Standard Liège with momentum on their side and a slice of good fortune, scored three goals.

At the 15th matchday, the matches took place the day after Christmas and the footballers' union organised its first strike action, calling for a strike for that matchday, forcing clubs to compete with players from the amateur divisions and only foreign professionals. As the season progressed and Bajević recovered from injury, AEK became a prolific attacking side. Moreover, after the defeat in the 2nd match that brought about the dismissal of Fadrhonc, AEK were defeated only once. They scored 74 league goals, having the highest-scoring attack in the league, which they won by seven points from PAOK. Thomas Mavros was the league's top scorer with 22 goals, while in fourth place was Takis Nikoloudis with 15.

AEK's dominance was also was also reflected in the Greek Cup. Čajkovski's team seemed unstoppable as they eliminated AO Chania at home in the first round, Panathinaikos away in the second round and Panionios at home in the round of 16. In the quarter-finals, AEK defeated Panelefsiniakos away and advanced to the semi-finals, where they faced Olympiacos in Nea Filadelfeia. Olympiacos took an early lead, but the goal only inspired AEK who responded by scoring six unanswered goals. They completed their dominant Cup run by defeating PAOK 2–0 in the final and won the title, to complete the domestic double for the second time in their history after 39 years. Bajević emerged as the top scorer in the tournament with 9 goals.

== Management team ==
Position	Staff
Manager	(Socialist Federal Republic of Yugoslavia) Zlatko Čajkovski
Assistant manager	(Socialist Federal Republic of Yugoslavia) Alexi Petrović
Assistant manager	(Greece) Andreas Stamatiadis
Goalkeeping coach	(Greece) Stelios Serafidis
Academy director	(Czechoslovakia) František Fadrhonc
Academy manager	(Greece) Stelios Serafidis
Head of Medical	(Greece) Lakis Nikolaou

== Players ==
=== Squad information ===
NOTE: The players are the ones that have been announced by the AEK Athens' press release. No edits should be made unless a player arrival or exit is announced. Updated 4 June 1978, 23:59 UTC+3.

Player	Nat.	Position(s)	Date of birth (Age)	Signed	Previous club	Transfer fee	Contract until
Goalkeepers
Nikos Christidis	(Greece)	GK	2 August 1944 (aged 33)	1976	(Greece) Aris	₯1,500,000	1984
Giorgos Sidiropoulos	(Greece)	GK	25 June 1949 (aged 29)	1973	(Greece) Trikala	₯1,800,000	1981
Lakis Stergioudas	(Greece)	GK	11 December 1952 (aged 25)	1972	(Greece) Niki Polygyros	₯36,000	1981
Defenders
Apostolos Toskas	(Greece)	CB	28 December 1947 (aged 30)	1969	(Greece) Trikala	₯1,500,000	1981
Lakis Nikolaou (Vice-captain)	(Greece)	CB / RB / ST / RW	17 July 1949 (aged 28)	1971	(Greece) Atromitos	₯600,000	1979
Babis Intzoglou	(Greece)	RB / LB / CB	1 April 1949 (aged 29)	1976	(Greece) Panionios	₯3,000,000	1984
Stefanos Theodoridis	(Greece)	RB / LB / CB / RM / LM	19 June 1950 (aged 28)	1969	(Greece) AEK Athens U20	—	1981
Giannis Mousouris	(Greece)	RB / RM / ST	26 January 1951 (aged 27)	1977	(Greece) AEL	₯2,500,000	1985
Petros Ravousis	(Greece)	CB / RB	1 October 1954 (aged 23)	1972	(Greece) Aetos Skydra	Free	1981
Aris Damianidis	(Greece)	CB / RB	2 March 1955 (aged 23)	1977	(Greece) Egaleo	₯3,500,000	1985
Midfielders
Milton Viera	(Uruguay)	CM / DM	11 May 1946 (aged 32)	1977	(Greece) Olympiacos	Free	1979
Lazaros Papadopoulos	(Greece)	RM / RB / LM / LB / RW / LW	3 January 1950 (aged 28)	1973	(Greece) Veria	₯1,300,000	1981
Takis Nikoloudis	(Greece)	CM / AM / RM / LM	26 August 1951 (aged 26)	1976	(Greece) Iraklis	Free	1984
Dionysis Tsamis	(Greece)	CM / DM / AM	17 October 1951 (aged 26)	1972	(Greece) Panetolikos	₯2,350,000	1981
Christos Ardizoglou	(Greece) (Israel)	RM / LM / RW / LW / AM / RB / LB	25 March 1953 (aged 25)	1974	(Greece) Apollon Athens	₯12,000,000	1982
Giorgos Vlachonikolis	(Greece)	AM / SS	1955 (aged 22–23)	1977	(Greece) Ilisiakos	₯1,100,000	1985
Fotis Outsikas	(Greece)	LM / LB / LW	26 May 1957 (aged 21)	1977	(Greece) AEK Athens U20	—	1985
Giorgos Vlantis	(Greece)	CM / AM	30 January 1958 (aged 20)	1976	(Greece) AEK Athens U20	—	1984
Forwards
Mimis Papaioannou (Captain)	(Greece)	SS / ST / AM / RW	17 November 1942 (aged 35)	1962	(Greece) Veria	₯175,000	1980
Dušan Bajević	(Socialist Federal Republic of Yugoslavia)	ST / SS	10 December 1948 (aged 29)	1977	(Socialist Federal Republic of Yugoslavia) Velež Mostar	Free	1979
Tasos Konstantinou	(Cyprus)	RW / SS / ST / RM / AM	11 March 1951 (aged 27)	1972	(Cyprus) EPA Larnaca	₯600,000	1980
Thomas Mavros	(Greece)	ST / LW	31 May 1954 (aged 24)	1976	(Greece) Panionios	₯10,000,000	1983
From Reserve Squad
Spyros Ikonomopoulos	(Greece)	GK	25 July 1959 (aged 18)	1977	(Greece) AO Akratas	—	
Dimitris Alafogiannis	(Greece)	GK	26 October 1960 (aged 17)	1976	(Italy) Roma Primavera	—	
Panagiotis Stylianopoulos	(Greece)	RB / LB / RM / DM	4 September 1957 (aged 20)	—	(Greece) AEK Athens U20	—	
Sokratis Kotidis	(Greece)	CB / DM	1959 (aged 18–19)	1975	(Greece) AEK Athens U20	—	
Takis Papatheodorou	(Greece)	CB	1959 (aged 18–19)	1972	(Greece) AEK Athens U20	—	
Theodoros Apostolopoulos	(Greece)	RB / LB	17 September 1956 (aged 21)	1977	(Greece) Chaidari	—	
Christos Kalaitzidis	(Greece)	LM / LW / LB	6 February 1959 (aged 19)	1973	(Greece) PO.K.E.	—	
Stefanos Kallinteroglou	(Greece)	RW / LW	1954 (aged 23–24)	1970	(Greece) AEK Athens U20	—	
Christos Saxanidis	(Greece)	RW / LW / RB / LB	1959 (aged 18–19)	1975	(Greece) AEK Athens U20	—	
Thomas Stafylas	(Greece)	ST / RW / LW / RM / LM	4 April 1958 (aged 20)	1974	(Greece) AEK Athens U20	—	
Giannis Outsikas	(Greece)	ST	1959 (aged 18–19)	1973	(Greece) Pamisos Messini	—	
Stefanos Zografos	(Greece)	ST	1959 (aged 18–19)	1977	(Greece) Vyzas Megara	—	
Argyris Boulmetis	(Greece)	ST	1959 (aged 18–19)	—	(Greece) AEK Athens U20	—	

== Transfers ==
=== In ===
Pos.	Player	From	Fee	Date	Contract Until	Source
DF	(Greece) Aris Damianidis	(Greece) Egaleo	₯3,500,000	11 July 1977	30 June 1985	
DF	(Greece) Giannis Mousouris	(Greece) AEL	₯2,500,000	26 July 1977	30 June 1985	
MF	(Uruguay) Milton Viera	(Greece) Olympiacos	Free transfer	1 August 1977	30 June 1978	
MF	(Greece) Fotis Outsikas	(Greece) AEK Athens U20	Promotion	26 August 1977	30 June 1985	
MF	(Greece) Giorgos Vlachonikolis	(Greece) Ilisiakos	₯1,100,000	23 July 1977	30 June 1985	
FW	(Socialist Federal Republic of Yugoslavia) Dušan Bajević	(Socialist Federal Republic of Yugoslavia) Velež Mostar	Free transfer	23 July 1977	30 June 1979	

=== Out ===
Pos.	Player	To	Fee	Date	Source
DF	(Greece) Sakis Zarzopoulos	(Greece) OFI	Contract termination	3 August 1977	
DF	(Greece) Giorgos Skrekis	(Greece) Panionios	Contract termination	1 August 1977	
FW	(Greece) Georgios Dedes	(Greece) Panionios	Contract termination	12 August 1977	
FW	(West Germany) Walter Wagner	(Greece) Aris	Contract termination	1 August 1977	
FW	(Greece) Alekos Papadopoulos	(Greece) OFI	Contract termination	29 July 1977	

=== Contract renewals ===
Pos.	Player	Date	Former Exp. Date	New Exp. Date	Source
DF	(Greece) Apostolos Toskas	1 July 1977	30 June 1977	30 June 1981	
DF	(Greece) Stefanos Theodoridis	21 July 1977	30 June 1977	30 June 1981	
MF	(Uruguay) Milton Viera	30 June 1978	30 June 1978	30 June 1979	

=== Overall transfer activity ===
Expenditure: ▼ ₯7,100,000

Income: ▲ ₯0

Net Total: ▼ ₯7,100,000

== Pre-season and friendlies ==
5 August 1977 Brugge tournament	QPR	3–1	AEK Athens	Bruges
20:00 EEST (UTC+3)	Bowles 11', 53'; Eastoe 12'	Report	Ardizoglou (yellow card); Papaioannou 10'; Viera (yellow card) 39'	Stadium: Jan Breydel Stadium; Attendance: 10,000; Referee: Julien Herpoel (Belgium)

7 August 1977 Brugge tournament	Club Brugge	2–2 (5–4 p)	AEK Athens	Bruges
20:00 EEST (UTC+3)	Vandereycken 43'; Krieger (yellow card) 45'; Verheecke 47'	Report	Intzoglou (yellow card); Bajević 44' (pen.); Mousouris 48'	Stadium: Jan Breydel Stadium; Attendance: 10,000; Referee: Jean-Claude Jourquin (Belgium)
	Penalties
	Courant (penalty scored); Cools (penalty scored); Simoen (penalty scored); Maes (penalty scored); Volders (penalty scored)		(penalty scored) Bajević; (penalty scored) Intzoglou; (penalty missed) Tsamis; (penalty scored) Mavros; (penalty scored) Konstantinou

10 August 1977 Friendly	AEK Athens	4–0	Slovan Bratislava	Nea Filadelfeia
21:00 EEST (UTC+3)	Mousouris 4', 83'; Bajević 7'; Nikoloudis 87'	Report		Stadium: AEK Stadium; Attendance: 22,050; Referee: Stelios Marinelis (Athens)

17 August 1977 Friendly	AEK Athens	4–0	Sportul Studențesc	Nea Filadelfeia
21:00 EEST (UTC+3)	Ardizoglou 13' (pen.); Mavros 15', 87'; Mousouris 37'	Report		Stadium: AEK Stadium; Attendance: 17,423; Referee: Nikos Fakis (Athens)

21 August 1977 Friendly	Olympiacos	1–2	AEK Athens	Piraeus
21:00 EEST (UTC+3)	Galakos 36'	Report	Nikoloudis 60'; Mavros 66'	Stadium: Karaiskakis Stadium; Attendance: 40,000; Referee: Vasilis Patarakis (Piraeus)

24 August 1977 Friendly	AEK Athens	1–0	Stal Mielec	Nea Filadelfeia
21:00 EEST (UTC+3)	Ravousis 14'	Report		Stadium: AEK Stadium; Attendance: 15,574; Referee: Giorgos Saraliotis (Kavala)

28 August 1977 Friendly	PAOK	0–0	AEK Athens	Thessaloniki
20:30 EEST (UTC+3)		Report		Stadium: Toumba Stadium; Attendance: 25,174; Referee: Nikos Zlatanos (Thessaloniki)

31 August 1977 Friendly	AEK Athens	4–0	Sparta Rotterdam	Nea Filadelfeia
	Mavros 23' (pen.); Konstantinou 68'; Nikoloudis 76'; Ardizoglou 80'	Report		Stadium: AEK Stadium; Attendance: 14,365; Referee: Alexopoulos (Athens)

4 September 1977 Friendly	Chalkida	0–1	AEK Athens	Chalcis
17:30 EEST (UTC+3)		Report	Papaioannou 42'	Stadium: Municipal Stadium of Chalkida; Referee: Giannis Adamakis (Chalkida)

5 September 1977 Friendly	AEK Athens	5–1	Ethnikos Piraeus	Nea Filadelfeia
21:00 EEST (UTC+3)	Papaioannou 27', 40'; Ardizoglou 29', 85'; Mavros 44'	Report	Pappas 29'	Stadium: AEK Stadium; Attendance: 8,307; Referee: Kontogiannis (Athens)

25 November 1977 Friendly	AEK Athens	3–2	Saudi Arabia U19	Nea Filadelfeia
14:45 EET (UTC+2)	Kallinteroglou 42', 56'; Ardizoglou 85'	Report	Callars 50'; Jassim 65'	Stadium: Nikos Goumas Stadium; Referee: Stelios Serafidis

29 November 1977 Friendly	AEK Athens	7–0	Saudi Arabia	Nea Filadelfeia
15:00 EET (UTC+2)	Papadopoulos 31'; Ardizoglou 40', 43'; Kallinteroglou 55'; Papatheodorou 63'; Saxanidis 70'; Vlantis 72'	Report		Stadium: Nikos Goumas Stadium; Referee: Andreas Stamatiadis

28 December 1977 Friendly	AEK Athens	2–1	Olympiacos	Nea Filadelfeia
14:30 EET (UTC+2)	Mousouris 63'; Mavros 73'	Report	Galakos 36'	Stadium: AEK Stadium; Attendance: 3,000; Referee: Nikos Makris (Athens)

29 March 1978 Friendly	Ethnikos Asteras	1–0	AEK Athens	Kaisariani
15:30 EET (UTC+2)	Koronellos 77'	Report		Stadium: Kaisariani Stadium; Attendance: 2,000; Referee: Methenitis

12 April 1978 Friendly	AEK Athens	5–1	Keratsini	Nea Filadelfeia
16:00 EET (UTC+2)	Toskas 30'; Papadopoulos 48', 53', 85'; Saxanidis 87'	Report	Anagnostopoulos 5'	Stadium: AEK Stadium; Referee: Andreas Stamatiadis

1 May 1978 Friendly	Kickers Offenbach	2–2	AEK Athens	Offenbach
17:00 EEST (UTC+3)	Intzoglou 20' (o.g.); Blechschmidt 55'	Report	Mavros 55', 65'	Stadium: Stadion am Bieberer Berg; Attendance: 7,000

4 May 1978 Friendly	1. FC Herzogenaurach	3–7	AEK Athens	Nuremberg
19:00 EEST (UTC+3)	Penen 7'; Zink 22'; Nurber 60'	Report	Nikoloudis 12', 57'; Mousouris 25'; Bajević 42'; Nikolaou 72'; Katsaros 76'; Mavros 80' (pen.)	Stadium: Rudolf-Dassler-Sportfeld; Attendance: 3,000

10 May 1978 Friendly	AEK Athens	3–2	Alexandria XI	Nea Filadelfeia
17:00 EEST (UTC+3)	Vlachonikolis 22'; Kottidis 52'; Saxanidis 90'	Report	Shehta 25'; Ahmed 80'	Stadium: AEK Stadium; Attendance: 1,500; Referee: Kattis

21 May 1978 Friendly	AEK Athens	2–0	QPR	Nea Filadelfeia
21:00 EEST (UTC+3)	Konstantinou 62' (pen.); Bajević 69'	Report	Williams (red card) 62'	Stadium: AEK Stadium; Attendance: 6,289; Referee: K. Kritikos

24 May 1978 Friendly	AEK Athens	2–3	PSAT XI	Nea Filadelfeia
21:00 EEST (UTC+3)	Chatziioannidis 16'; Saxanidis 90'	Report	Pathiakakis 35'; Kontogeorgakis 40'; De Melo 78' (pen.)	Stadium: AEK Stadium; Attendance: 1,822; Referee: Nikos Makris (Athens)
Note: The incomes of the match were donated to the former football player of AEK, Nestor Errea.

== Competitions ==
=== Overall record ===
Competition	First match	Last match	Starting round	Final position	Record							
Competition	First match	Last match	Starting round	Final position	Pld	W	D	L	GF	GA	GD	Win %
Alpha Ethniki	11 September 1977	28 May 1978	Matchday 1	Winners	34	21	11	2	74	27	+47	61.76
Greek Cup	21 December 1977	4 June 1978	First round	Winners	6	6	0	0	22	4	+18	100.00
UEFA Cup	14 September 1977	2 November 1977	First round	Second round	4	1	1	2	6	7	−1	25.00
Total					44	28	12	4	102	38	+64	63.64

Last updated: 4 June 1978
Source: Competitions

=== Alpha Ethniki ===
==== League table ====
Pos	Team	Pld	W	D	L	GF	GA	GD	Pts	Qualification or relegation
1	AEK Athens (C)	34	21	11	2	74	27	+47	53	Qualification for European Cup first round
2	PAOK	34	16	14	4	48	24	+24	46	Qualification for Cup Winners' Cup first round (Note: Since AEK Athens also won the Greek Cup and were qualified for the 1978–79 European Cup, the Cup runners-up, PAOK earned a spot in the Cup Winners' Cup first round.)
3	Panathinaikos	34	19	7	8	63	25	+38	45	Qualification for UEFA Cup first round
4	Olympiacos	34	17	10	7	46	20	+26	44	Qualification for UEFA Cup first round
5	PAS Giannina	34	14	10	10	45	39	+6	38	

Source: RSSSF
Rules for classification: 1st points; 2nd decision match; 3rd head-to-head goal difference.
(C) Champions

==== Results summary ====
Overall								Home						Away					
Pld	W	D	L	GF	GA	GD	Pts	W	D	L	GF	GA	GD	W	D	L	GF	GA	GD
34	21	11	2	74	27	+47	53	15	2	0	49	12	+37	6	9	2	25	15	+10

Source: Competitive matches

==== Results by Matchday ====
Round	1	2	3	4	5	6	7	8	9	10	11	12	13	14	15	16	17	18	19	20	21	22	23	24	25	26	27	28	29	30	31	32	33	34
Ground	H	A	H	A	A	H	A	H	A	H	A	H	A	H	H	A	H	A	H	A	H	H	A	H	A	H	A	H	A	H	A	A	H	A
Result	W	L	W	W	W	W	D	W	W	D	D	W	D	W	D	D	W	D	W	W	W	W	W	W	D	W	D	W	D	W	D	W	W	L
Position	1	8	6	1	2	1	1	1	1	1	1	1	1	1	1	1	1	1	1	1	1	1	1	1	1	1	1	1	1	1	1	1	1	1

Source: Competitive matches
A = Away; H = Home; W = Win; D = Draw; L = Loss; P = Postponed

==== Matches ====
11 September 1977 1	AEK Athens	6–2	Veria	Nea Filadelfeia
17:00 EEST (UTC+3)	Intzoglou 6'; Ardizoglou 14', 33'; Mousouris 42'; Mavros 84' (pen.); Nikoloudis 90'		Spyridon (yellow card) 60'; Yfantidis 76'; Sioutis 88'	Stadium: AEK Stadium; Attendance: 14,754; Referee: Abatzis (Thessaloniki)

18 September 1977 2	Olympiacos	1–0	AEK Athens	Piraeus
16:30 EEST (UTC+3)	Persias 17'; Delikaris (red card) 75'			Stadium: Karaiskakis Stadium; Attendance: 37,868; Referee: Angelopoulos (Argolida)

2 October 1977 3	AEK Athens	5–1	Panionios	Nea Filadelfeia
15:30 EEST (UTC+3)	Outsikas (yellow card); Konstantinou 44' (pen.); Nikoloudis 56'; Papaioannou 58'; Mousouris 82'; Nikolaou 84'		Alexopoulos (yellow card); Zoumas 54'	Stadium: AEK Stadium; Attendance: 13,216; Referee: Vasilis Messalas (Patras)

9 October 1977 4	Panserraikos	0–2	AEK Athens	Serres
15:30 EEST (UTC+3)	Aritzis (yellow card) (yellow-red card) 64'		Mavros 8'; Nikoloudis 63', (yellow card) 64'; Nikolaou (yellow card) 70'	Stadium: Serres Municipal Stadium; Attendance: 5,674; Referee: Vasilis Patarakis (Piraeus)

16 October 1977 5	Kavala	2–3	AEK Athens	Kavala
15:30 EEST (UTC+3)	Balian 25' (pen.), (yellow card); Machairidis 74', (yellow card); Ioannou (yellow card)		Intzoglou (yellow card); Mavros (yellow card); Mousouris 23', 85'; Konstantinou 36' (pen.)	Stadium: Kavala National Stadium; Attendance: 9,507; Referee: Manolis Vardakas (Kozani)

23 October 1977 6	AEK Athens	3–1	Egaleo	Nea Filadelfeia
14:30 EEST (UTC+3)	Nikoloudis 5'; Mavros 17'; Mousouris 19'		Chatziskoulidis 33'	Stadium: AEK Stadium; Attendance: 12,461; Referee: Lolos (Athens)

30 October 1977 7	Panathinaikos	1–1	AEK Athens	Chalcis
14:30 EET (UTC+2)	Aslanidis 27'		Mavros 74'	Stadium: Municipal Stadium of Chalkida; Attendance: 14,150; Referee: Nikos Lagogiannis (Piraeus)
Note: Match held at Chalcis because Panathinaikos had a stadium ban due to player incidents in the away game against Olympiacos.

6 November 1977 8	AEK Athens	2–0	Apollon Athens	Nea Filadelfeia
14:30 EET (UTC+2)	Viera (yellow card); Theodoridis (yellow card); Outsikas (yellow card); Nikoloudis 53'; Mavros 55'		Vrettos (yellow card)	Stadium: AEK Stadium; Attendance: 10,793; Referee: Kefalas (Thessaloniki)

13 November 1977 9	Pierikos	0–2	AEK Athens	Katerini
14:30 EET (UTC+2)			Nikoloudis 59'; Papaioannou 77'	Stadium: Katerini Stadium; Attendance: 4,872; Referee: Pachigiannakis

23 November 1977 10	AEK Athens	1–1	OFI	Nea Filadelfeia
15:00 EET (UTC+2)	Intzoglou (yellow card); Konstantinou (penalty missed) 16'; Nikoloudis 47'		Foustanakis (yellow card); Tzirakis 44'	Stadium: AEK Stadium; Attendance: 11,600; Referee: Kostas Karakitsos (Lamia)

27 November 1977 11	PAS Giannina	0–0	AEK Athens	Ioannina
14:30 EET (UTC+2)	Seitaridis (yellow card); Papachristou (yellow card)			Stadium: Zosimades Stadium; Attendance: 3,881; Referee: Antonis Vassaras (Thessaloniki)

4 December 1977 12	AEK Athens	4–0	Panachaiki	Nea Filadelfeia
14:30 EET (UTC+2)	Mavros 23', 68', 73'; Tsamis 85'		Spentzopoulos (yellow card)	Stadium: AEK Stadium; Attendance: 6,877; Referee: Miltiadis Paschalidis (Serres)

11 December 1977 13	Iraklis	3–3	AEK Athens	Thessaloniki
14:30 EET (UTC+2)	Michailidis (yellow card) 3', (goal) 13'; Kalaitzidis (yellow card) 42'; Chatzieleftheriou 68'; Gesios 70'		Papaioannou 3'; Konstantinou (yellow card) 20', (goal) 53' (pen.); Mavros 84'	Stadium: Kaftanzoglio Stadium; Attendance: 12,104; Referee: Charalampos Pamporidis (Pella)

18 December 1977 14	AEK Athens	1–0	Kastoria	Nea Filadelfeia
14:30 EET (UTC+2)	Konstantinou 43' (pen.)		Argyros (yellow card) 44'; Papadimitriou (yellow card) 45'	Stadium: AEK Stadium; Attendance: 10,951; Referee: Giorgos Moschopoulos (Thessaloniki)

26 December 1977 15	AEK Athens	1–1	Ethnikos Piraeus	Nea Filadelfeia
14:30 EET (UTC+2)	Βoulmetis 28'		Chouchoulis 59'	Stadium: AEK Stadium; Attendance: 5,482; Referee: Nikos Zlatanos (Thessaloniki)
Note: The Greek professional footballers were on strike in that matchday, thus all the clubs of the division were forced to compete with either amateur players or foreigners.

8 January 1978 16	PAOK	1–1	AEK Athens	Thessaloniki
14:30 EET (UTC+2)	Koudas (yellow card) 25'; Damanakis 67'		Viera (yellow card) 14'; Bajević 44'	Stadium: Toumba Stadium; Attendance: 17,552; Referee: Timoleon Latsios (Larissa)

15 January 1978 17	AEK Athens	4–2	Aris	Nea Filadelfeia
14:30 EET (UTC+2)	Viera (yellow card); Nikoloudis 15'; Mavros 31'; Papaioannou 56'; Bajević 74'		Semertzidis 18', (yellow card); Drampis 87'	Stadium: AEK Stadium; Attendance: 20,169; Referee: Dimitris Bazakoulas (Aetoloacarnania)

22 January 1978 18	Veria	1–1	AEK Athens	Veria
14:30 EET (UTC+2)	Yfantidis 4'; Terzis (yellow card) 29'; Spyridon (yellow card) 40'; Kousoulakis (yellow card) 74'		Nikolaou 11'; Ravousis (yellow card) 33'; Intzoglou (yellow card) 36'; Outsikas (yellow card) 76'	Stadium: Veria Stadium; Attendance: 7,036; Referee: Stefanos Rammos (Thessaloniki)

29 January 1978 19	AEK Athens	2–0	Olympiacos	Nea Filadelfeia
15:00 EET (UTC+2)	Mavros 13', 53', (penalty missed) 65'			Stadium: AEK Stadium; Attendance: 26,607; Referee: Avgoustos Sapatakidis (Thessaloniki)

5 February 1978 20	Panionios	0–1	AEK Athens	Nea Smyrni
15:00 EET (UTC+2)	Mavrikis (yellow card) 8'; Sempekos (yellow card) 32'		Bajević (yellow card) 32'; Ravousis (yellow card) 45'; Mavros 75'	Stadium: Nea Smyrni Stadium; Attendance: 11,498; Referee: Timoleon Latsios (Larissa)

12 February 1978 21	AEK Athens	2–1	Panserraikos	Nea Filadelfeia
15:00 EET (UTC+2)	Konstantinou 13', 22' (pen.)		Dimitriou 44'	Stadium: AEK Stadium; Attendance: 16,030; Referee: Panagiotis Kolliropoulos (Patras)

19 February 1978 22	AEK Athens	3–0	Kavala	Nea Filadelfeia
15:00 EET (UTC+2)	Bajević 7'; Konstantinou 29', 75'			Stadium: AEK Stadium; Attendance: 16,302; Referee: Michalis Ornerakis (Chania)

26 February 1978 23	Egaleo	2–4	AEK Athens	Aigaleo
15:00 EET (UTC+2)	Chatziskoulidis 9'; Konstantopoulos 41'		Nikoloudis 55', 75', 82'; Mavros 90'	Stadium: Aigaleo Municipal Stadium; Attendance: 9,919; Referee: Panagiotis Tsolakidis (Thessaloniki)

5 March 1978 24	AEK Athens	2–0	Panathinaikos	Nea Filadelfeia
15:00 EET (UTC+2)	Intzoglou (yellow card); Ravousis (yellow card); Konstantinou 50' (pen.), (yellow card); Bajević (red card) 68'; Mousouris 89'		Livathinos (yellow card)	Stadium: AEK Stadium; Attendance: 29,806; Referee: Tsoukaladelis (Lamia)

12 March 1978 25	Apollon Athens	0–0	AEK Athens	Rizoupoli
15:30 EET (UTC+2)				Stadium: Rizoupoli Stadium; Referee: Aristeidis Lekkas (Piraeus)

19 March 1978 26	AEK Athens	5–2	Pierikos	Nea Filadelfeia
15:30 EET (UTC+2)	Ardizoglou 3'; Nikoloudis 35', 51'; Mavros 5' (pen.), 90' (pen.)		Miskos 29'; Kalampakas 74'	Stadium: AEK Stadium; Attendance: 11,768; Referee: Nikos Zlatanos (Thessaloniki)

26 March 1978 27	OFI	0–0	AEK Athens	Heraklion
15:30 EEST (UTC+3)	Vlachos (yellow card)		Ravousis (yellow card)	Stadium: Theodoros Vardinogiannis Stadium; Attendance: 6,747; Referee: Manolis Vardakas (Kozani)

2 April 1978 28	AEK Athens	3–0	PAS Giannina	Nea Filadelfeia
	Papaioannou 6'; Mavros 25', 50'			Stadium: AEK Stadium; Attendance: 20,728; Referee: Abatzis (Thessaloniki)

9 April 1978 29	Panachaiki	0–0	AEK Athens	Patras
16:00 EEST (UTC+3)				Stadium: Panachaiki Stadium; Attendance: 10,000; Referee: Panagiotis Tsolakidis (Thessaloniki)

16 April 1978 30	AEK Athens	3–1	Iraklis	Nea Filadelfeia
16:00 EEST (UTC+3)	Mavros 13', 16'; Mousouris 24'		Chatzieleftheriou (yellow card); Penos (yellow card); Xanthopoulos 19'	Stadium: AEK Stadium; Attendance: 15,430; Referee: Giannis Triantafyllou (Dodecanese)

23 April 1978 31	Kastoria	1–1	AEK Athens	Kastoria
16:30 EEST (UTC+3)	Paunovski 65'		Papaioannou 73'	Stadium: Municipal Stadium of Kastoria; Attendance: 4,332; Referee: Giorgos Moschopoulos (Thessaloniki)

7 May 1978 32	Ethnikos Piraeus	1–6	AEK Athens	Piraeus
16:30 EEST (UTC+3)	Papalamprou 14'		Nikoloudis 2', 86'; Mavros 44'; Papaioannou 57'; Konstantinou (penalty missed) 60'; Ardizoglou 69'; Mousouris 79'	Stadium: Karaiskakis Stadium; Attendance: 12,923; Referee: Antonis Vassaras (Thessaloniki)

14 May 1978 33	AEK Athens	2–0	PAOK	Nea Filadelfeia
17:00 EEST (UTC+3)	Bajević 17'; Mavros 88'			Stadium: AEK Stadium; Attendance: 21,741; Referee: Theodoros Tsanaklidis (Kavala)

28 May 1978 34	Aris	2–0	AEK Athens	Thessaloniki
16:00 EEST (UTC+3)	Skouboe 34' (pen.); Papetas 74'			Stadium: Aris Stadium; Attendance: 6,112; Referee: Dimitris Pantzalis (Piraeus)

=== Greek Cup ===
==== Matches ====
21 December 1977 First round	AEK Athens	6–1	AO Chania	Nea Filadelfeia
14:00 EET (UTC+2)	Bajević 2', 20', 40', 80'; Viera 32'; Vlantis 37'		Troumpoukis 70'	Stadium: AEK Stadium; Referee: Nikos Zlatanos (Thessaloniki)

1 February 1978 Second round	Panathinaikos	0–1	AEK Athens	Ampelokipoi
14:30 EET (UTC+2)	Eleftheriadis (yellow card); Kyzas (yellow card); Konstantinou (yellow card); Livathinos (yellow card)		Mavros (yellow card); Nikolaou (yellow card); Viera (yellow card); Bajević 56'	Stadium: Leoforos Alexandras Stadium; Attendance: 23,050; Referee: Giorgos Armodoros (Piraeus)

8 March 1978 Round of 16	AEK Athens	3–0	Panionios	Nea Filadelfeia
15:00 EET (UTC+2)	Mavros 16', 90'; Papaioannou 58'			Stadium: AEK Stadium; Attendance: 10,969; Referee: Giorgos Moschopoulos (Thessaloniki)

19 April 1978 Quarter-finals	Panelefsiniakos	2–4	AEK Athens	Elefsina
16:00 EEST (UTC+3)	Tsivgoulis 3'; Vourdamis 90'		Bajević 14', 59'; Mavros 30', 83'	Stadium: Municipal Stadium of Elefsina; Attendance: 6,000; Referee: Stefanos Rammos (Thessaloniki)

17 May 1978 Semi-finals	AEK Athens	6–1	Olympiacos	Nea Filadelfeia
16:30 EEST (UTC+3)	Bajević 14'; Mavros 19', 76', 89'; Konstantinou 36', (yellow card) 37'; Intzoglou (yellow card) 42'; Nikoloudis 57'	Report	Spence 12'; Kyrastas (yellow card) 37'	Stadium: AEK Stadium; Attendance: 30,000; Referee: Theodoros Tsanaklidis (Kavala)

4 June 1978 Final	AEK Athens	2–0	PAOK	Piraeus
21:00 EEST (UTC+3)	Viera (yellow card) 26'; Bajević 50'; Mavros 80'	Report (pages 4,5)		Stadium: Karaiskakis Stadium; Attendance: 23,483; Referee: Nikos Zlatanos (Thessaloniki)

=== UEFA Cup ===
==== First round ====
14 September 1977 First leg	ASA Târgu Mureș (Romania)	1–0	(Greece) AEK Athens	Târgu Mureș, Romania
16:00 EEST (UTC+3)	Onutan (yellow card) 66'; Fănici 81'	Report	Stergioudas (yellow card) 56'	Stadium: Stadionul 23 August; Attendance: 14,000; Referee: Mitko Chukov (Bulgaria)

28 September 1977 Second leg	AEK Athens (Greece)	3–0 (3–1 agg.)	(Romania) ASA Târgu Mureș	Athens, Greece
21:00 EEST (UTC+3)	Papaioannou 24'; Viera (yellow card) 25', (goal) 35'; Intzoglou (yellow card) 30'; Mousouris 44'	Report	Both (yellow card) 5'; Hajnal (yellow card) 39'	Stadium: AEK Stadium; Attendance: 14,730; Referee: Tome Manojlovski (Yugoslavia)

==== Second round ====
19 October 1977 First leg	AEK Athens (Greece)	2–2	(Belgium) Standard Liège	Athens, Greece
18:30 EEST (UTC+3)	Mavros 57'; Ravousis (yellow card) 77'; Nikoloudis 83'; Intzoglou (yellow card) 90'	Report	Sigurvinsson 14'; Visnyei (yellow card) 25'; Poel 42'	Stadium: AEK Stadium; Attendance: 20,458; Referee: Ken Burns (England)

2 November 1977 Second leg	Standard Liège (Belgium)	4–1 (6–3 agg.)	(Greece) AEK Athens	Liège, Belgium
20:00 EET (UTC+2)	Nikoloudis 41' (o.g.); Riedl 64'; Nickel 69'; Gorez 85'	Report	Mavros (yellow card) 1'; Ardizoglou (yellow card) 1', (goal) 63'; Viera (yellow card) 1'	Stadium: Stade Maurice Dufrasne; Attendance: 35,000; Referee: Walter Hungerbühler (Switzerland)
Note: The official report states that Standard Liège's first goal at the 41st minute was scored by Labarbe, but in the highlights of the game it appears clearly that it was an own goal by Nikoloudis.

== Statistics ==
=== Squad statistics ===
As of 4 June 1978

No.	Pos	Player	Alpha Ethniki		Greek Cup		UEFA Cup		Total	
No.	Pos	Player	Apps	Goals	Apps	Goals	Apps	Goals	Apps	Goals
Goalkeepers
—	GK	(Kingdom of Greece) Nikos Christidis	19	0	5	0	0	0	24	0
—	GK	(Kingdom of Greece) Giorgos Sidiropoulos	0	0	1	0	0	0	1	0
—	GK	(Kingdom of Greece) Lakis Stergioudas	14	0	0	0	4	0	18	0
Defenders
—	DF	(Kingdom of Greece) Apostolos Toskas	13	0	3	0	0	0	16	0
—	DF	(Kingdom of Greece) Lakis Nikolaou	31	2	5	0	4	0	40	2
—	DF	(Kingdom of Greece) Babis Intzoglou	25	1	5	0	3	0	33	1
—	DF	(Kingdom of Greece) Stefanos Theodoridis	10	0	2	0	4	0	16	0
—	DF	(Kingdom of Greece) Giannis Mousouris	31	8	6	0	4	1	41	9
—	DF	(Kingdom of Greece) Petros Ravousis	30	0	6	0	4	0	40	0
—	DF	(Kingdom of Greece) Aris Damianidis	14	0	3	0	2	0	19	0
Midfielders
—	MF	(Uruguay) Milton Viera	25	0	4	1	4	1	33	2
—	MF	(Kingdom of Greece) Lazaros Papadopoulos	5	0	3	0	0	0	8	0
—	MF	(Kingdom of Greece) Takis Nikoloudis	32	15	6	1	4	1	42	17
—	MF	(Kingdom of Greece) Dionysis Tsamis	26	1	4	0	2	0	32	1
—	MF	(Kingdom of Greece) Christos Ardizoglou	17	4	3	0	3	1	23	5
—	MF	(Kingdom of Greece) Giorgos Vlachonikolis	3	0	0	0	0	0	3	0
—	MF	(Kingdom of Greece) Fotis Outsikas	8	0	1	0	2	0	11	0
—	MF	(Kingdom of Greece) Giorgos Vlantis	2	0	1	1	0	0	3	1
Forwards
—	FW	(Kingdom of Greece) Mimis Papaioannou	31	7	5	1	3	1	39	9
—	FW	(Socialist Federal Republic of Yugoslavia) Dušan Bajević	19	4	5	9	0	0	24	13
—	FW	(Cyprus) Tasos Konstantinou	25	9	5	1	2	0	32	10
—	FW	(Kingdom of Greece) Thomas Mavros	33	22	5	8	4	1	42	31
From Reserve Squad
—	GK	(Kingdom of Greece) Spyros Ikonomopoulos	1	0	0	0	0	0	1	0
—	DF	(Kingdom of Greece) Panagiotis Stylianopoulos	1	0	0	0	0	0	1	0
—	DF	(Kingdom of Greece) Sokratis Kottidis	1	0	0	0	0	0	1	0
—	DF	(Kingdom of Greece) Takis Papatheodorou	1	0	0	0	0	0	1	0
—	DF	(Kingdom of Greece) Theodoros Apostolopoulos	2	0	0	0	0	0	2	0
—	MF	(Kingdom of Greece) Christos Kalaitzidis	1	0	0	0	0	0	1	0
—	FW	(Kingdom of Greece) Stefanos Kallinteroglou	1	0	0	0	0	0	1	0
—	FW	(Kingdom of Greece) Christos Saxanidis	1	0	0	0	0	0	1	0
—	FW	(Kingdom of Greece) Thomas Stafylas	1	0	0	0	0	0	1	0
—	FW	(Kingdom of Greece) Giannis Outsikas	1	0	0	0	0	0	1	0
—	FW	(Kingdom of Greece) Stefanos Zografos	1	0	0	0	0	0	1	0
—	FW	(Kingdom of Greece) Argyris Boulmetis	1	1	0	0	0	0	1	1

=== Goalscorers ===
As of 4 June 1978
The list is sorted by competition order when total goals are equal, then by position and then alphabetically by surname.

Rank	Pos.	Player	Alpha Ethniki	Greek Cup	UEFA Cup	Total
1	FW	(Greece) Thomas Mavros	22	8	1	31
2	MF	(Greece) Takis Nikoloudis	15	1	1	17
3	FW	(Socialist Federal Republic of Yugoslavia) Dušan Bajević	4	9	0	13
4	FW	(Cyprus) Tasos Konstantinou	9	1	0	10
5	DF	(Greece) Giannis Mousouris	8	0	1	9
5	FW	(Greece) Mimis Papaioannou	7	1	1	9
7	MF	(Greece) Christos Ardizoglou	4	0	1	5
8	DF	(Greece) Lakis Nikolaou	2	0	0	2
8	MF	(Uruguay) Milton Viera	0	1	1	2
10	DF	(Greece) Babis Intzoglou	1	0	0	1
10	MF	(Greece) Dionysis Tsamis	1	0	0	1
10	MF	(Greece) Giorgos Vlantis	0	1	0	1
10	FW	(Greece) Tasos Boulmetis	1	0	0	1
Own goals			0	0	0	0
Totals			74	22	6	102

=== Hat-tricks ===
Numbers in superscript represent the goals that the player scored.

Player	Against	Result	Date	Competition	Source
(Greece) Thomas Mavros	(Greece) Panachaiki	4–0 (H)	4 December 1977	Alpha Ethniki	
(Socialist Federal Republic of Yugoslavia) Dušan Bajević^{4}	(Greece) AO Chania	6–1 (A)	21 December 1977	Greek Cup	
(Greece) Takis Nikoloudis	(Greece) Egaleo	4–2 (Α)	26 February 1978	Alpha Ethniki	
(Greece) Thomas Mavros	(Greece) Olympiacos	6–1 (H)	17 May 1978	Greek Cup	

=== Clean sheets ===
As of 4 June 1978
The list is sorted by competition order when total clean sheets are equal and then alphabetically by surname. Clean sheets in games where both goalkeepers participated are awarded to the goalkeeper who started the game. Goalkeepers with no appearances are not included.

Rank	Player	Alpha Ethniki	Greek Cup	UEFA Cup	Total
1	(Greece) Nikos Christidis	10	3	0	13
2	(Greece) Lakis Stergioudas	5	0	1	6
3	(Greece) Spyros Ikonomopoulos	0	0	0	0
3	(Greece) Giorgos Sidiropoulos	0	0	0	0
Totals		15	3	1	19

=== Disciplinary record ===
As of 4 June 1978

N	P	Nat.	Name	Alpha Ethniki			Greek Cup			UEFA Cup			Total			Notes
N	P	Nat.	Name	Yellow card	Second yellow card	Red card	Yellow card	Second yellow card	Red card	Yellow card	Second yellow card	Red card	Yellow card	Second yellow card	Red card	Notes
Goalkeepers
—	GK	(Kingdom of Greece)	Nikos Christidis													
—	GK	(Kingdom of Greece)	Giorgos Sidiropoulos													
—	GK	(Kingdom of Greece)	Lakis Stergioudas							1			1			
Defenders
—	DF	(Kingdom of Greece)	Apostolos Toskas													
—	DF	(Kingdom of Greece)	Lakis Nikolaou	1			1						2			
—	DF	(Kingdom of Greece)	Babis Intzoglou	4			1			2			7			
—	DF	(Kingdom of Greece)	Stefanos Theodoridis	1									1			
—	DF	(Kingdom of Greece)	Giannis Mousouris													
—	DF	(Kingdom of Greece)	Petros Ravousis	3						1			4			
—	DF	(Kingdom of Greece)	Aris Damianidis													
Midfielders
—	MF	(Uruguay)	Milton Viera	3			2			2			7			
—	MF	(Kingdom of Greece)	Lazaros Papadopoulos													
—	MF	(Kingdom of Greece)	Takis Nikoloudis	1									1			
—	MF	(Kingdom of Greece)	Dionysis Tsamis													
—	MF	(Kingdom of Greece)	Christos Ardizoglou							1			1			
—	MF	(Kingdom of Greece)	Giorgos Vlachonikolis													
—	MF	(Kingdom of Greece)	Fotis Outsikas	3									3			
—	MF	(Kingdom of Greece)	Giorgos Vlantis													
Forwards
—	FW	(Kingdom of Greece)	Mimis Papaioannou													
—	FW	(Socialist Federal Republic of Yugoslavia)	Dušan Bajević	1		1							1		1	
—	FW	(Cyprus)	Tasos Konstantinou	2			1						3			
—	FW	(Kingdom of Greece)	Thomas Mavros	1			1			1			3			
From Reserve Squad
—	GK	(Kingdom of Greece)	Spyros Ikonomopoulos													
—	DF	(Kingdom of Greece)	Panagiotis Stylianopoulos													
—	DF	(Kingdom of Greece)	Sokratis Kottidis													
—	DF	(Kingdom of Greece)	Takis Papatheodorou													
—	DF	(Kingdom of Greece)	Theodoros Apostolopoulos													
—	MF	(Kingdom of Greece)	Christos Kalaitzidis													
—	FW	(Kingdom of Greece)	Stefanos Kallinteroglou													
—	FW	(Kingdom of Greece)	Christos Saxanidis													
—	FW	(Kingdom of Greece)	Thomas Stafylas													
—	FW	(Kingdom of Greece)	Giannis Outsikas													
—	FW	(Kingdom of Greece)	Stefanos Zografos													
—	FW	(Kingdom of Greece)	Argyris Boulmetis													

=== Starting 11 ===
This section presents the most frequently used formation along with the players with the most starts across all competitions.

N.	Formation	Matchday(s)
44	4–4–2 (D)	1–34

Nat.	Player	Pos.
(Greece)	Nikos Christidis	GK
(Greece)	Petros Ravousis	RCB
(Greece)	Lakis Nikolaou	LCB
(Greece)	Giannis Mousouris	RB
(Greece)	Babis Intzoglou	LB
(Uruguay)	Milton Viera	DM
(Cyprus)	Tasos Konstantinou	RCM
(Greece)	Takis Nikoloudis	LCM
(Greece)	Mimis Papaioannou (C)	AM
(Socialist Federal Republic of Yugoslavia)	Dušan Bajević	CF
(Greece)	Thomas Mavros	CF

Last updated: 1978-06-04

== Awards ==
Player	Pos.	Award	Source
(Greece) Thomas Mavros	FW	Alpha Ethniki Top Scorer	
(Socialist Federal Republic of Yugoslavia) Dušan Bajević	FW	Greek Cup Top Scorer	
