= 1978 Greek Football Cup final =

1978 Greek Cup final
- Event: 1977–78 Greek Football Cup
| AEK Athens | PAOK |
| 2 | 0 |
- Date: 4 June 1978
- Venue: Karaiskakis Stadium, Piraeus
- Referee: Nikos Zlatanos (Thessaloniki)
- Attendance: 23,483

The 1978 Greek Cup final was the 34th final of the Greek Cup. The match took place on 4 June 1978 at Karaiskakis Stadium. The contesting teams were AEK Athens and PAOK. It was AEK Athens' tenth Greek Cup final in their 54 years of existence and PAOK's tenth Greek Cup final and second consecutive in their 52-year history. With their conquest of the Cup, AEK Athens achieved the first domestic double after 39 years and the second in their history.

== Venue ==
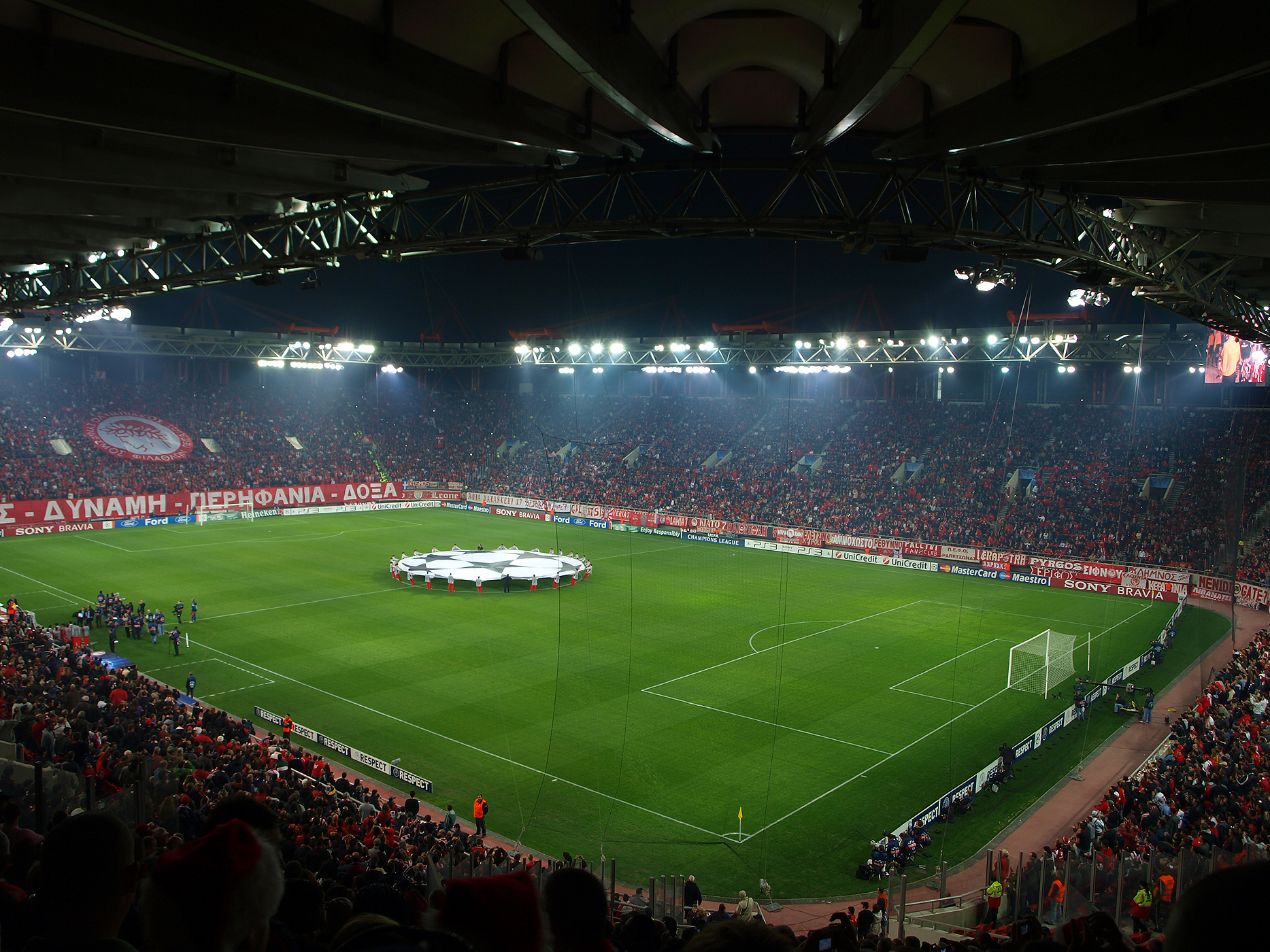
Karaiskakis Stadium.

This was the tenth Greek Cup final held at Karaiskakis Stadium, after the 1957, 1958, 1965, 1969, 1971, 1972, 1973, 1975 and 1977 finals. (Karaiskakis also hosted the replay match of the 1960 final between Panathinaikos and Olympiacos).

Karaiskakis Stadium was built in 1895 and renovated once in 1964. The stadium is used as a venue for Olympiacos and Ethnikos Piraeus and was used for Greece on various occasions. Its current capacity is 42,000 and hosted a European Cup Winners' Cup final in 1971 and the first leg of the Intercontinental Cup final in 1971.

== Background ==
AEK Athens had reached the Greek Cup final nine times, winning five of them. The last time that they played in a final was in 1956, where they had won Olympiacos 2–1.

PAOK had reached the Greek Cup final nine times, winning two of them. The last time that they had won the Cup was in 1974 (4–3 on penalties, which came after a 2–2 draw at the end of the extra time against Olympiacos). The last time that had played in a final was in 1977, where they had lost to Panathinaikos by 2–1.

The two teams had met each other in a Cup final one time in the 1939 final.

== Route to the final ==
| AEK Athens | | Round | PAOK | |
|---|---|---|---|---|
| Opponent | Result | | Opponent | Result |
| AO Chania | 6–1 (H) | First round | Levadiakos | 6–1 (H) |
| Panathinaikos | 1–0 (A) | Second round | Olympiacos Volos | 4–1 (H) |
| Panionios | 3–0 (H) | Round of 16 | Iraklis | 1–0 (A) |
| Panelefsiniakos | 4–2 (A) | Quarter-finals | Veria | 5–0 (H) |
| Olympiacos | 6–1 (H) | Semi-finals | Aris | 1–0 (a.e.t.) (A) |

== Match ==
=== Details ===
4 June 1978
21:00 EEST

| AEK Athens | 2–0 | PAOK |
|---|---|---|
| Bajević 50'; Mavros 80' | Report (pages 4,5) |

Karaiskakis Stadium, Piraeus
Attendance: 23,483
Referee: Nikos Zlatanos (Thessaloniki)

| AEK Athens | PAOK |

| GK | 1 | (Greece) Nikos Christidis |
| RB | 2 | (Greece) Giannis Mousouris |
| CB | 5 | (Greece) Lakis Nikolaou |
| CB | 4 | (Greece) Petros Ravousis |
| LB | 3 | (Greece) Babis Intzoglou |
| DM | 6 | (Uruguay) Milton Viera | (yellow card) 26' |
| RM | 7 | (Cyprus) Tasos Konstantinou | | (substituted off) 79' |
| LM | 8 | (Greece) Takis Nikoloudis |
| AM | 10 | (Greece) Mimis Papaioannou (c) | | (substituted off) 65' |
| CF | 9 | (Socialist Federal Republic of Yugoslavia) Dušan Bajević |
| CF | 11 | (Greece) Thomas Mavros |
Substitutes:
| GK | 15 | (Greece) Lakis Stergioudas |
| DF | | (Greece) Theodoros Apostolopoulos |
| DF | | (Greece) Apostolos Toskas | | (substituted on) 65' |
| MF | | (Greece) Dionysis Tsamis |
| MF | | (Greece) Lazaros Papadopoulos | | (substituted on) 79' |
| MF | | (Greece) Christos Ardizoglou |
Manager:
(Socialist Federal Republic of Yugoslavia) Zlatko Čajkovski

| GK | 1 | (Socialist Federal Republic of Yugoslavia) Mladen Furtula |
| RB | 2 | (Greece) Giannis Gounaris | (substituted off) 72' |
| CB | 4 | (Greece) Angelos Anastasiadis |
| CB | 5 | (Greece) Koulis Apostolidis (c) |
| LB | 3 | (Greece) Konstantinos Iosifidis |
| DM | 8 | (Greece) Stavros Sarafis |
| RM | 7 | (Greece) Panagiotis Kermanidis |
| LM | 6 | (Greece) Kostas Orfanos |
| AM | 10 | (Greece) Giorgos Koudas |
| CF | 9 | (Greece) Georgios Kostikos | (substituted off) 79' |
| CF | 11 | (Brazil) Neto Guerino |
Substitutes:
| DF | | (Greece) Nikos Alavantas | (substituted on) 79' |
| MF | | (Greece) Ioannis Damanakis | (substituted on) 72' |
Manager:
(Greece) Lakis Petropoulos

Assistant referees:
Panagiotis Tsolakidis (Thessaloniki)
Giorgos Moschopoulos (Thessaloniki)

Match rules

- 90 minutes
- 30 minutes of extra time if necessary
- Penalty shootout if scores still level
- Five named substitutes
- Maximum of two substitutions

== See also ==
- 1977–78 Greek Football Cup
