= Milton Viera =

Uruguayan footballer (1946–2026)

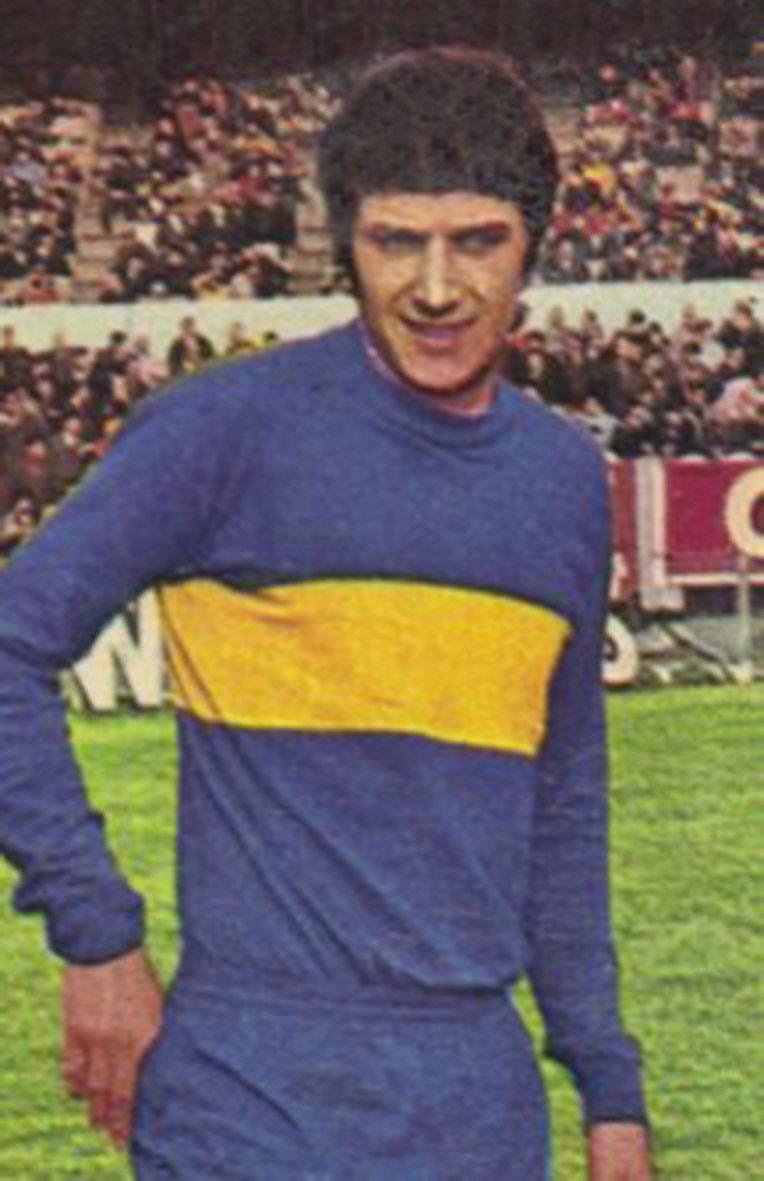
- Viera playing for Boca Juniors

Personal information
- Full name: Milton Viera Rivero
- Date of birth: 11 May 1946
- Place of birth: Melo, Uruguay
- Date of death: 20 September 2026 (aged 80)
- Height: 1.75 m (5 ft 9 in)
- Position: Midfielder

Youth career
- 1961–1962: Nacional

Senior career*
Years	Team	Apps	(Gls)
1962–1968	Nacional	119	(19)
1968	→ Boca Juniors (loan)	3	(0)
1968–1972	Peñarol	92	(19)
1972–1977	Olympiacos	112	(11)
1977–1979	AEK Athens	33	(0)

International career
1966	Uruguay	5	(1)
- * Club domestic league appearances and goals

Milton Viera Rivero (11 May 1946 – 20 September 2026) was a Uruguayan professional footballer who played as a midfielder. In 1975 he was called to the World XI.

== Club career ==
=== Latin America ===
Viera took his first football steps at Nacional. He signed his first professional contract with the Uruguayan team in 1962, aged just 17. It was the year he was promoted from the youth ranks to the first team of Nacional. He remained in the team until 1968, even achieving the conquest of two Uruguayan Championships. During his time at Nacional, Viera was called up to the national team at the age of just 20. In 1968, Viera left Uruguay and traveled to neighboring Argentina on behalf of Boca Juniors. In the club of Buenos Aires he played for just one year making a total of three appearances, failing to win a title. In 1969 he returned to Uruguay, this time on behalf of Peñarol. He played there for three years, without however managing to win a title. During his time at the club, Viera made intermittent very good performances, which caused the interest of several teams in both Latin America and Europe.

=== Olympiacos ===
In 1972, he left Latin America for the first time in his career and traveled to Europe, specifically Greece with destination Olympiacos. In fact, in the summer that he transferred to club of Piraeus, Julio Losada was also acquired, which made it easier for Viera to adapt to his new team. Both of them were playing as Greek. Characteristic of the fame of Viera at that time, was the fact that he was the second footballer to compete in Greece having previously participated in a FIFA World Cup. With the red and whites, he won three consecutive Greek championships and two Greek Cups including two domestic doubles. During the presence of Viera in Olympiacos and specifically on 26 March 1975, he alongside his teammate, Giorgos Delikaris competed in World XI match together with Pelé and Johan Cruyff. In his last season at Olympiacos, he suffered from a health problem and incorrect diagnoses by doctors at the Romanian clinic where the Piraeus management had sent him. With the intervention of his journalist friend Nikitas Gavalas, he visited a specialist doctor in Austria where he underwent a hernia operation to overcome the problem that was bothering him. Returning fully recovered to Greece, he faced the indifference of the people of the team who, taking into account his advanced footballing age of 31 years and the burden of his health adventure, released him.

=== AEK Athens ===
Upon hearing of his release from Olympiacos, the manager of AEK Athens, František Fadrhonc saw in his face the ideal solution to complete the midfield of the yellow-blacks. He suggested the club's owner, Loukas Barlos sign Viera. After getting the consent of the club's doctor and former president of the HFF, Vasilis Chatzigiannis regarding the player's health, Barlos responded immediately and in the summer of 1977 Viera signed for AEK.

Alongside players such as Mimis Papaioannou, Thomas Mavros, Takis Nikoloudis, Christos Ardizoglou and Tasos Konstantinou, Fadrhonc created a spectacular team. Viera became the irreplaceable "link" that connected the team's defense with the offense, occasionally enlisting the required toughness of a defender and sometimes displaying technical virtues. In the two seasons he played in the "double-headed eagle", he celebrated the two consecutive Championships and a Greek Cup, including a domestic double in 1978. A new injury in 1979 season forced him to terminate his contract with AEK and retire as a footballer. A last-ditch effort by the sports writer Giorgos Venetoulias to play one more season at Ethnikos Piraeus was eventually fruitless.

== International career ==
Vieira made five appearances, scoring once with Uruguay. He was called up for the first time in 1966 the age of just 20. It was in the 1966 FIFA World Cup tie against England, in a match where he played as a starter.

== After football ==
Viera returned in 1979 to Uruguay, gradually developing an activity as a football manager based in Montevideo, where he lived having three sons. The last one which was born during his time at the AEK, was named "Loukas" as a sign of tribute to Loukas Barlos, who was President and owner of AEK in the 1970's.

== Death ==
Viera died on 20 September 2026, at the age of 80.

== Honours ==
Nacional

- Uruguayan Primera División: 1963, 1966

Olympiacos

- Alpha Ethniki: 1972–73, 1973–74, 1974–75
- Greek Cup: 1972–73, 1974–75

AEK Athens

- Alpha Ethniki: 1977–78, 1978–79
- Greek Cup: 1977–78
