= Aris Damianidis =

Greek footballer

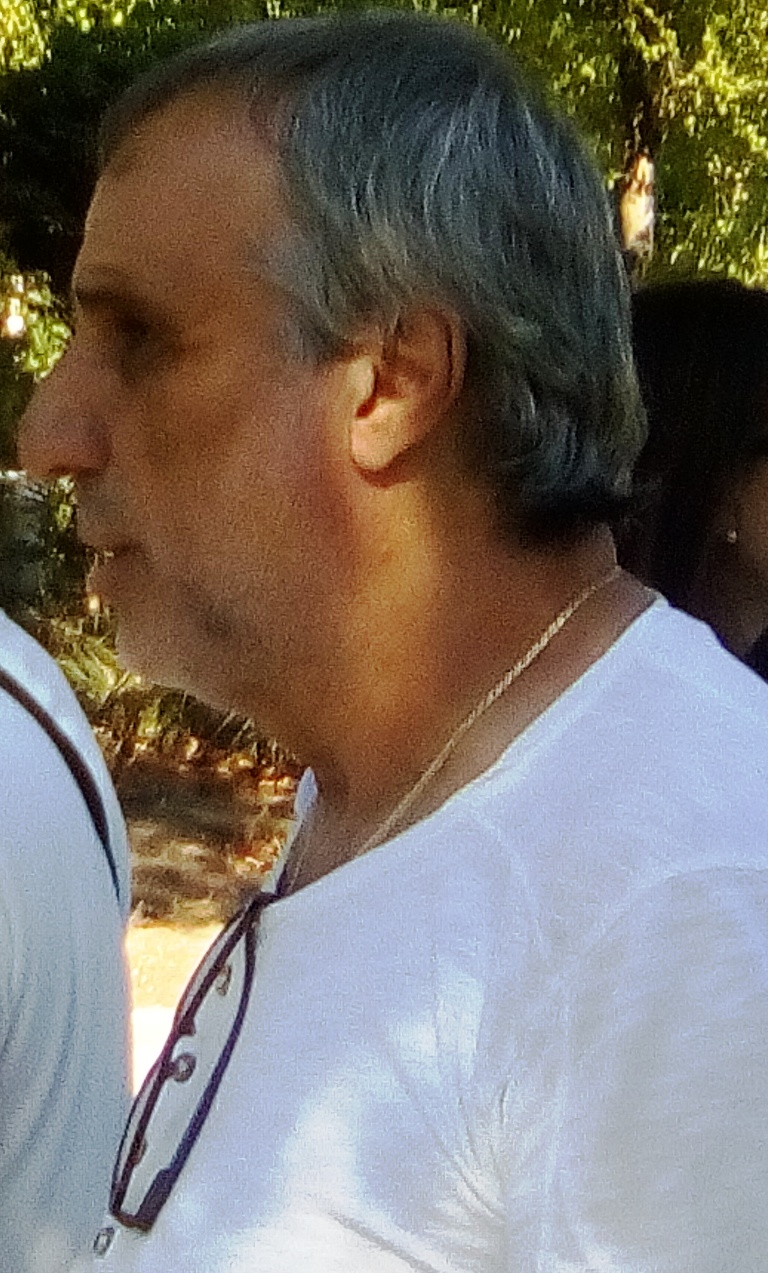
- Aris Damianidis

Personal information
- Date of birth: 2 March 1955 (age 71)
- Place of birth: Nikaia, Athens, Greece
- Height: 1.81 m (5 ft 11 in)
- Position: Defender

Youth career
- AO Petralona
- –1971: Iraklis Nikaia

Senior career*
Years	Team	Apps	(Gls)
1971–1977	Egaleo	161	(7)
1977–1980	AEK Athens	42	(0)
1980–1982	Olympiacos	12	(0)
1982–1984	Egaleo	41	(1)
1984–1985	Proodeftiki		
1985–1986	AE Nikaia		
Total		256	(8)

International career
1974–1975	Greece U21		
1978	Greece military		

Managerial career
- 1999: Ethnikos Piraeus (assistant)
- * Club domestic league appearances and goals

Aris Damianidis (Greek: Άρης Δαμιανίδης; born 3 March 1955) is a Greek former professional footballer who played as defender.

== Club career ==
Damianidis started his career at a very young age initially at AO Petralona and then at Iraklis Nikaia from where he was transferred to Egaleo in 1971. In his seven year at the club, he was a key player in the defensive line and one of the main contributors to their promotion to the first division in 1977

On 11 July 1977, he was transferred to AEK Athens. In his first season with the yellow-blacks, he was a key of the team that reached the semi-finals of the UEFA Cup in 1977. He did not manage to establish himself as a starter since the competition with the star players of the time was rough. In his three seasons at the club, he won two consecutive championships and a Cup, including a domestic double in 1978.

On 1 August 1980 he moved to Olympiacos, where he played for two seasons. There he won another league titles and a Cup, while also achieving his second domestic double in 1981.

In 1982 he returned to his beloved Egaleo and played for two seasons. In 1984 he played second division side, Proodeftiki for a year, before retiring at AE Nikaia in 1986, where he played in the fourth division of the country.

== Honours ==
Egaleo

- Beta Ethniki: 1976–77, 1982–83

AEK Athens

- Alpha Ethniki: 1977–78, 1978–79
- Greek Cup: 1977–78

Olympiacos

- Alpha Ethniki: 1980–81, 1981–82
- Greek Cup: 1980–81
