= Giorgos Vlantis =

Greek footballer (born in 1958)

Personal information
- Full name: Georgios Vlantis
- Date of birth: 30 January 1958
- Place of birth: Athens, Greece
- Position: Midfielder

Youth career
- 1971–1976: AEK Athens

Senior career*
| Years | Team | Apps | (Gls) |
| 1976–1983 | AEK Athens | 14 | (1) |
| 1979–1980 | → Panachaiki (loan) | 8 | (0) |
| 1980–1981 | → APS Patrai (loan) | | |
| 1981–1982 | → Diagoras (loan) | | |
| 1983–1984 | Acharnaikos | | |
| 1984–1989 | Atromitos | | |

International career
| 1977 | Greece U21 | | |
- * Club domestic league appearances and goals

Giorgios Vlantis (Greek: Γιώργος Βλαντής; born 30 January 1958) is a former Greek professional footballer who played as midfielder.

== Club career ==
Vlantis started football at the age of 13, when he enlisted in the infrastructure departments of AEK Athens. On 13 December 1976 he signed a professional contract and was promoted to the men's team. Vlantis made his debut on 6 March 1977, in a 1–1 away draw against Panserraikos. He was member of the team that reached the semi-finals of the UEFA Cup, despite not making any appearance in the tournament. In general, during his first three seasons at the club, Vlantis didn't manage to make many appearances, due to their star roster at the time and his simultaneous engagement with his studies at the National Technical University of Athens, from which he graduated with a degree in Civil engineering. Nevertheless, he was part of the squad that won the domestic double in 1978 and the Championship in 1979.

In the summer of 1979 the need to continue his studies at the Polytechnic School of the University of Patras, forced him to move to Patras and join Panachaiki as a loan. In order to stay in the city for another year, he was loaned to APS Patrai for the following season. After the end of his loan spells at Patras in the summer of 1981, he was again loaned to Diagoras.

Vlantis returned to AEK in the summer of 1982, but again was not able to establish himself in the main squad. However, despite having a not so impressive career at the yellow-blacks , he was fortunate enough to be a member of the team during their peak moments of that era. During the years of his temporary absence, when he was out on loan, AEK abstained from titles and upon his return to the team, they won the Greek Cup in 1983. His last match with AEK was on 26 June 1983, in a 4–2 win over PAS Giannina at Nea Filadelfia. On 28 July 1983 Vlantis was transferred to the second division side Acharnaikos. The following season he signed for Atromitos, where he played for 5 seasons before ending his career in 1989.

== Personal life ==
His father Giannis was a footballer of the post-war AEK. Vlantis is also nephew of another former footballer of AEK, Stelios Skevofilakas, who was cousin to his father.

Vlantis works as Civil engineer in his own technical office at Irakleio and he is married with two daughters. He has repeatedly been involved in politics and was elected Municipal Councilor at the Municipality of Irakleio, serving as Deputy Mayor of the Municipality. He also became a politician in the Athens B district, with SYRIZA.

== Honours ==
AEK Athens

- Alpha Ethniki: 1977–78, 1978–79
- Greek Cup: 1977–78, 1982–83
