= Fotis Outsikas =

Greek footballer (born 1967)

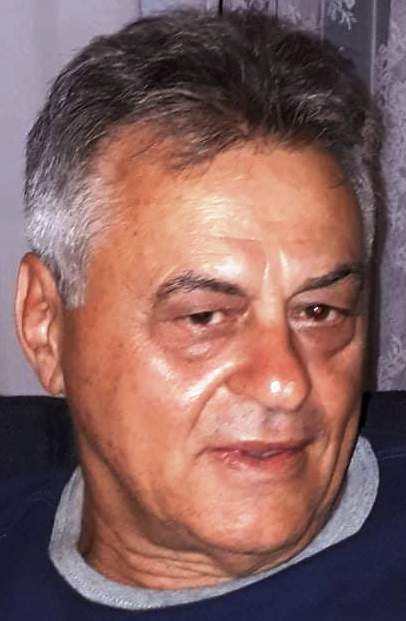
- Fotis Outsikas

Personal information
- Full name: Fotios Outsikas
- Date of birth: May 26, 1957 (age 69)
- Place of birth: Messini, Messenia, Greece
- Positions: Left midfielder; left back; left winger

Youth career
- 1971–1973: Pamisos Messini
- 1973–1977: AEK Athens

Senior career*
Years	Team	Apps	(Gls)
1977–1978	AEK Athens	13	(0)
1978–1979	Acharnaikos		
1979–1981	Panachaiki		
1981–1982	Diagoras		
1982–1987	Egaleo		
1987–1989	Marko		

International career
1977	Greece U21		
1977	Greece Amateur	2	(0)
- * Club domestic league appearances and goals

Fotis Outsikas (Greek: Φώτης Ούτσικας; born 26 May 1957) is a Greek former professional footballer who played as left midfielder.

== Club career ==
Outsikas first played football at Pamisos Messini, where he made his debut at the age of just 14 with the men's team in the local championship. In the summer 1973 he was transferred to AEK Athens to join their academies at the recommendation of Andreas Stamatiadis, at the age of just 16 as a great hope for the future, since he was one of the few footballers at that time with speed and a remarkable pass. In 1977, despite playing for the reserve team, he was also featured with the senior team under František Fadrhonc. During that season the team reached to the semi-finals of the UEFA Cup. On 26 August 1977, he became a professional with the senior team. However, the harsh competition made it difficult for the young Outsikas to establish himself within the squad. With the yellow-blacks, he won two consecutive Championships and one Greek Cup including a domestic double in 1978.

On 18 August 1978, Outsikas, after being released from AEK due to a serious injury, signed at Acharnaikos, where he played for one year before moving to Panachaiki. In 1981 he signed with Diagoras and in the summer of 1982 with Egaleo, where he made an important 5-year career, both in the first division, as well as in the second division. He finished his career in 1989, playing for Marko.

== International career ==
Outsikas was an international with both the Greece U21 and the Greece U19 teams. In 1977 he played with the Amateur team of Greece in the UEFA Amateur Cup in the qualifying matches against Italy and Austria.

== Personal life ==
His brother, Giannis was also a footballer, who played at the reseve team of AEK in during the late 70's.

== Honours ==
AEK Athens

- Alpha Ethniki: 1977–78, 1978–79
- Greek Cup: 1977–78

Egaleo

- Beta Ethniki: 1982–83
