= Lakis Stergioudas =

Greek footballer (born 1952)

Personal information
- Full name: Triantafyllos Stergioudas
- Date of birth: 11 December 1952 (age 73)
- Place of birth: Portaria, Greece
- Height: 1.84 m (6 ft 0 in)
- Position: Goalkeeper

Youth career
- 1968–1971: Thermaikos Portaria

Senior career*
| Years | Team | Apps | (Gls) |
| 1971–1972 | Niki Polygyros | | |
| 1972–1984 | AEK Athens | 126 | (0) |
| 1984–1986 | PAOK | 15 | (0) |
| 1986–1988 | Naoussa | | |
| Total | | 141 | (0) |

International career
| 1976–1977 | Greece | 5 | (0) |

Managerial career
- 1995–2000: AEK Athens (goalkeeping coach)
- * Club domestic league appearances and goals

Lakis Stergioudas (Greek: Λάκης Στεργιούδας; born 11 December 1952) is a Greek former professional footballer who played as a goalkeeper.

== Club career ==
Stergioudas started playing football in the academy of the amateur club of his birthplace, Thermaikos Portaria, but he played and made up his first team debut at the club of Chalkidiki, Niki Polygyros. On 27 July 1972, at the age of 19, he impressed the people of AEK Athens, which resulted in his transfer to the club of Athens for a fee of 36,000 drachmas. Stergioudas became a first team regular and in 1977 he was in the squad that reached the semi-finals of the UEFA Cup. On 11 January 1981 at 40th minute of the match against OFI, his attempt to stop Sifis Koronakis, he collided with him and suffered a fractured tibia-fibula. That injury kept him out of the pitch for many months and eventually lost his position to Nikos Christidis, Spyros Ikonomopoulos and eventually Christos Arvanitis. In his 12-year spell at AEK Stergioudas won two championships in a row and two cups, including a domestic double in 1978.

On 28 September 1984 Stergioudas was released from AEK and on 23 November he signed for PAOK. In his first season he won another Championship with the club of Thessaloniki, while on 22 June 1985 they reached the Cup final, where they lost to AEL by 4–1. With the conquest of the championship of 1985, Stergioudas became the only player to win a championship with both AEK Athens and PAOK. In 1986 he decided to retire from professional football and in 1988 he ended his career as footballer playing for Naoussa.

== International career ==
Stergioudas played for Greece for two years. His debut took place on 10 November 1976 in the friendly match, in Kavala, against Austria, when under the guidance of Lakis Petropoulos he was a key player in the entire match. His last appearance took place on 21 September 1977 in the away friendly match against Romania, this time under Alketas Panagoulias, where he again played in the whole match.

== Honours ==
AEK Athens

- Alpha Ethniki: 1977–78, 1978–79
- Greek Cup: 1977–78, 1982–83

PAOK

- Alpha Ethniki: 1984–85
