= Babis Intzoglou =

Greek footballer

Personal information
- Full name: Charalampos Inztoglou
- Date of birth: 1 April 1949 (age 77)
- Place of birth: Nikaia, Athens, Greece
- Height: 1.78 m (5 ft 10 in)
- Position: Defender

Youth career
- –1965: AE Nikaia

Senior career*
Years	Team	Apps	(Gls)
1965–1968	Ionikos		
1968–1976	Panionios	228	(27)
1975	→ Toronto Homer (loan)		
1976–1980	AEK Athens	95	(2)
1980–1983	Diagoras	95	(5)
1983–1984	Ionikos	30	(2)

International career
1968	Greece U19		
1968–1970	Greece U21		
1969–1977	Greece	9	(0)
- * Club domestic league appearances and goals

Babis Intzoglou (Greek: Μπάμπης Ιντζόγλου; born 1 April 1949) is a Greek former professional footballer who played as a defender.

== Club career ==
Intzoglou started football at a youth level with AE Nikaia and signed his first professional deal in 1965 at Ionikos. In 1969, he played in the first division with Panionios, where his older brother Thanasis was playing. During his tenure with Panionios, he assisted in securing the 1971 Balkans Cup for Panionios by defeating Besa Kavajë. During his tenure with Panionios, he featured in the 1969–70 Inter-Cities Fairs Cup, and the 1971–72 UEFA Cup, where they eliminated Atlético Madrid. In the summer of 1975 he played abroad in the Canadian National Soccer League with Toronto Homer.

On 21 July 1976, Intzoglou was transferred to AEK Athens for a fee of 3 million drachmas. Under František Fadrhonc he was converted from a center back to a full-back, where his impact on the defense, became more effective. He was a key player in AEK's course to the semi-finals of the 1976–77 UEFA Cup. He also played with the "yellow-blacks" in the next season's UEFA Cup and the 2 following seasons in the European Cup. In his 4 seasons at the club, he won 2 Championships and a Greek Cup including a domestic double in 1978.

On 18 August 1980, he signed for Diagoras in the second division for three years and later returned to Ionikos, where he retired at the summer of 1984.

== International career ==
Intzoglou was a member of the Greece U21 when it was formed for the first time in 1968 with the aim of participating in the 1st Balkan Youth Championship held at the Kaftanzoglio Stadium in Thessaloniki. In the same year he was a key member of the Greece U19 that participated in the Final phase of the European Championship held in France.

Intzoglou played with Greece in 1969, and made nine appearances. His first international appearance was on 4 May 1969, in a 2–2 away draw against Portugal for the FIFA World Cup qualifiers. He was unlucky and was replaced in the 24th minute due to injury. His last appearance in the shirt with the national emblem was on 23 March 1977 in a 4–0 away defeat by Czechoslovakia in a friendly match, in which he played until the 77th minute.

== Personal life ==
Intzoglou's brothers Thanasis and Christos were also footballers, as well as his son, Lefteris, who also played for AEK Athens. After retiring as a footballer, he worked as a private employee in a large electrical company.

== Honours ==
Panionios

- Balkans Cup: 1971

AEK Athens

- Alpha Ethniki: 1977–78, 1978–79
- Greek Cup: 1977–78

Greece U21

- Balkan Youth Championship: 1969
