= Nikos Christidis =

Greek footballer and manger (born 1944)

Personal information
- Full name: Nikolaos Christidis
- Date of birth: 2 August 1944 (age 82)
- Place of birth: Thessaloniki, Greece
- Height: 1.80 m (5 ft 11 in)
- Position: Goalkeeper

Youth career
- 1958–1961: Aris

Senior career*
| Years | Team | Apps | (Gls) |
| 1961–1976 | Aris | 264 | (0) |
| 1974 | → Toronto Homer (loan) | | |
| 1976–1982 | AEK Athens | 63 | (0) |
| Total | | 327 | (0) |

International career
| 1963 | Greece U19 | 6 | (0) |
| 1964–1978 | Greece | 26 | (0) |

Managerial career
- 1984–1987: AEK Athens (assistant)
- 1986: AEK Athens (interim)
- 1987: AEK Athens (interim)
- 1988–1990: Edessaikos
- 1990–1991: Kalamata
- 1991–1992: Paniliakos
- 1992–1993: Sparta
- 1994–1995: AO Chania
- 1998: Greece U21 (assistant)
- 2000–2001: Greece (assistant)
- 2001: Greece (interim)
- * Club domestic league appearances and goals

Nikos Christidis (Greek: Νίκος Χρηστίδης; born 2 August 1944) is a Greek former professional footballer who played as a goalkeeper and later a manager.

== Club career ==
Christidis started his football career in the youth divisions of Aris. In 1961 he was promoted to the first team where he won the Greek Cup in 1970. He was for years the club's main goalkeeper, until 1974 when he was accused of bribery in a match against Olympiacos by Aris president, Kampanis. As a result, he was released from the club and he was punished with a three-year suspension from all sporting activities by the General Secretariat of Sports and was banned from Aris for life, however many years later he was vindicated. In the summer of 1974, he played in the National Soccer League with Toronto Homer.

On 12 July 1976, after the actions of their owner, Loukas Barlos, Christidis was transferred to AEK Athens for a fee of 1.5 million drachmas. On 16 March 1977, at the rematch of the UEFA Cup quarter-final against QPR, AEK were winning by 3–0 equaling the score of the first leg. As the match was at the extra time and was heading to penalty shoot-out, the manager František Fadrhonc decided use his remaining substitution to put him in the game replacing his main goalkeeper, Lakis Stergioudas, as he valued his experience, his composure and high penalty save rate. Christidis proved his manager right and with his 2 penalty saves sent AEK to the semi-finals of the institution. In the following years with AEK he won the 1978 domestic double, the 1979 championship and in the summer of 1982 he finished his career at the yellow-blacks, at the age of 38.

== International career ==
Christidis played for Greece U19 6 times. He was also the main goalkeeper of the squad that competed in the European Championship of 1963.

Christidis made with Greece 26 appearances, between 1964 and 1978, four of which as a captain.

== Managerial career ==
After Christidis ended his playing career and worked for many years as assistant coach and as the goalkeeping coach for AEK. He also worked as a first coach mainly in teams of smaller divisions. He assumed the position of coach initially as an interim on 26 April 1987, when a two-month exclusion sentence was imposed on the then coach of AEK, Nikos Alefantos. But shortly after Alefantos was fired and Christidis took over until the end of the season.

He occasionally managed various clubs such as A.O. Karditsa, Ionikos, Edessaikos, Kalamata, Paniliakos, Sparta, Trikala and Chania. In 1996 he was in charge of infrastructure departments at AEK. In 1998 he worked as an assistant to Giannis Kollias in Greece U21 and in 2000 as an assistant to Vasilis Daniil in Greece, while in 2001 he was their first coach, in a friendly match against Russia, before Otto Rehhagel took over the technical leadership.

== Honours ==
Aris

- Greek Cup: 1969–1970

AEK Athens

- Alpha Ethniki: 1977–78, 1978–79
- Greek Cup: 1977–1978
