= Lakis Nikolaou =

Greek footballer (born 1949)

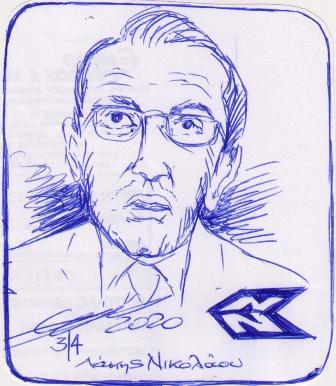
- Drawing of Lakis Nikolaou

39th president of AEK Athens
- In office 8 October 1997 – 5 December 1998
- Preceded by: Alexis Kougias
- Succeeded by: Dimitris Melissanidis

Personal details
- Born: 17 July 1949 (age 77) Ios, Greece
- Spouse: Eleni Nikolaou
- Children: 3
- Occupation: Orthopedics surgeon
Association football career
- Full name: Pantelis Nikolaou
- Height: 1.84 m (6 ft 0 in)
- Positions: Defender; striker
Team information
- Current team: AEK Athens (Head of Medical)
Youth career
- 1966–1967: Atromitos
Senior career*
Years	Team	Apps	(Gls)
1967–1971	Atromitos		
1971–1982	AEK Athens	225	(26)
International career
1968–1973	Greece U19	15	(0)
1973	Greece U21		
1973–1980	Greece	15	(0)
1975–1977	Greece military	5	(1)
- * Club domestic league appearances and goals

Lakis Nikolaou (Greek: Λάκης Νικολάου; born 17 July 1949) is a Greek former professional footballer who played as a centre back. He is the current medical director of AEK Athens.

== Early life ==
Nikolaou was born on July 18 of 1949 in Ios of Cyclades. He spent his school years in Peristeri and finished high school in 1966 at the Anargyrio and Korgialenio School, in Spetses where he was enrolled as a boarder together with his brother. He started playing football at an early age, when with friends and neighbors they formed the Irodotos Peristeri team, playing friendly matches with other teams in the area. In these matches he was watched by the people of Atromitos, who signed in 1967. In Atromitos he started playing as a defender and then as a striker, due to the team's lack of attackers. Finishing high school, he succeeded in entering the Mathematics Department but his burning desire to study medicine made him drop out of school and enroll in the Medical School of Bari, with the purpose of transferring to the University of Athens, which he did. During his stay at Bari, he played with the amateur club Barletta as a sweeper.

== Club career ==
In 1971, after four years of presence in the offensive line of Atromitos, Nikolaou aroused the interest of the major clubs. In one of Atromitos' matches, the manager of AEK Athens, Branko Stanković and the administrator of the club, Stamatis Papastamatiou, who watched the match, were impressed by the playing style of Nikolaou. As a result, on 31 July AEK signed Nikοlaou for a fee of 600,000 drachmas and two players as an exchange, while he was promised 300,000 drachmas as a signature premium, which eventually were not given to him. For three seasons he competed as a striker, while at the same time he continued his studies at the Medical School. This juxtaposition proved particularly difficult as required attendance at faculty workshops and mandated attendance at team practiced often come at the expense of one another.

This double occupation brought Nikolaou close from being released from AEK in 1974, but under the possibility of signing to any of their big rivals, the president of AEK, Loukas Barlos called him to stay in the club. Nikolaou accepted with the term that the 1971 signature premium of 300,000 drachmas to be given to him and rejoined the team but the pay remained to be seen until today. Under the new manager, František Fadrhonc he was relocated as a centre-back, where he was established. The team under Barlos and Fadrhonc, where Nikolaou was a starter, was distinguished both domestically and internationally as they reached the semi-finals of the UEFA Cup in 1977, won two championships and one Greek Cup, including a domestic double in 1978. He created a defensive duo with Petros Ravousis, where they were complementing each other and were considered as one of the most prominent of the era. He was declared "Athlete of the year" for the years 1974 and 1979 by the Panhellenic Sports Press Association.

After the departure of Mimis Papaioannou, Nikolaou became the team's captain. In the summer of 1980, Nikolaou decided to stop his playing career and remain in the club exclusively as the team's doctor. As AEK faced problems midseason, Nikolaou was urgently called by the manager, Miltos Papapostolou to put on his football shoes again and help the team. He accepted and competed for another one and a half season in the yellow-black jersey. His final match was on 30 May 1982 against Kastoria.

== International career ==
Nikolaou played with Greece U19 15 times, where he competed in the European Championship in 1971.

Nikolaou made his debut for Greece on 8 September 1973 and played a total of 15 matches. He was a participant at the UEFA Euro 1980.

== Other activities ==
In his medicine career, Nikolaou received the title of the specialty of orthopedics and was declared a doctor of the University of Athens in 1975. He obtained the specialty title of Orthopedics in February 1981 and in 1985 he received the title of Doctor of the University of Athens. From 1983 to 1986 Nikolaou did further training at Duke in the USA in the field of sports injuries and has been awarded by the American Orthopedic Association for his pioneering work in cruciate ligament transplants of the knee and his long-term studies in the field of the physiology of muscle injuries. On 8 July 1977, while he was still playing for AEK, he was appointed as the team's doctor and from 1987 he has been the head of their medical department. Since 1987, his professional relationship with the Orthopedic Clinic of the Medical Center led a medical coverage agreement between the Center and Olympiacos, which brought him as head of the medical department of the club from 2003 to 2009. He was the doctor of the national teams of Greece from 1982 to 1994, while he served as President of its Health Committee and consequently a member of the Board of Directors in 1994-95.

On 8 October 1997, after pressure and with AEK Athens having financial issues, he accepted the assumption of the presidency of club under the owner company ENIC for a period of about a year.

== Personal life ==
He has been married to Eleni since 1974 and has three children and five grandchildren.

== Career statistics ==
=== Club ===
Appearances and goals by club, season and competition
Club	Season	League (Note: Also includes play-off matches.)			Greek Cup		Europe		Balkans Cup		Total	
Club	Season	Division	Apps	Goals	Apps	Goals	Apps	Goals	Apps	Goals	Apps	Goals
AEK Athens	1971–72	Alpha Ethniki	31	11	2	0	2	0	0	0	35	11
AEK Athens	1972–73	Alpha Ethniki	31	5	1	0	4	2	0	0	36	7
AEK Athens	1973–74	Alpha Ethniki	28	7	3	4	0	0	0	0	31	11
AEK Athens	1974–75	Alpha Ethniki	32	2	3	0	0	0	0	0	35	2
AEK Athens	1975–76	Alpha Ethniki	29	3	4	0	4	0	0	0	37	3
AEK Athens	1976–77	Alpha Ethniki	27	0	3	0	10	0	0	0	40	0
AEK Athens	1977–98	Alpha Ethniki	31	2	5	0	4	0	0	0	40	2
AEK Athens	1978–79	Alpha Ethniki	28	1	6	0	4	1	0	0	38	2
AEK Athens	1979–80	Alpha Ethniki	22	3	2	0	2	0	0	0	26	3
AEK Athens	1980–81	Alpha Ethniki	12	0	4	0	0	0	0	0	16	0
AEK Athens	1981–82	Alpha Ethniki	24	2	3	2	0	0	0	0	27	4
Career total			295	6	36	6	30	3	0	0	361	45

=== International ===
Appearances and goals by national team and year
National team	Year	Apps	Goals
Greece	1973	1	0
Greece	1974	2	0
Greece	1975	5	0
Greece	1976	2	0
Greece	1977	3	0
Greece	1978	1	0
Greece	1979	0	0
Greece	1980	1	0
Total		15	0

== Honours ==
AEK Athens

- Alpha Ethniki: 1977–78, 1978–79
- Greek Cup: 1977–78
