= Petros Ravousis =

Greek footballer and manager (born 1954)

Personal information
- Full name: Petros Ravousis
- Date of birth: 1 October 1954 (age 72)
- Place of birth: Kalyvia, Pella, Greece
- Height: 1.80 m (5 ft 11 in)
- Position: Defender

Youth career
- 1970–1972: Aetos Skydra

Senior career*
Years	Team	Apps	(Gls)
1972–1984	AEK Athens	263	(3)
1984–1988	Levadiakos	50	(2)
Total		313	(5)

International career
1973–1976	Greece U21		
1976–1982	Greece	22	(0)
1978–1979	Greece military	2	(0)

Managerial career
- 1988–1996: AEK Athens (assistant)
- 1996–1997: AEK Athens
- 1997: Paniliakos
- 1998: Panetolikos
- 1999: Veria
- 2000: AEK Larnaca
- 2002–2003: Akratitos
- 2005: Marko
- * Club domestic league appearances and goals

Petros Ravousis (Greek: Πέτρος Ραβούσης; born 1 October 1954) is a Greek former professional footballer who played as defender and a former manager.

== Club career ==
Ravousis took his first football steps in Aetos Skydra. On 18 July 1972 he was transferred to AEK Athens.

Ravousis was a dynamic and tough defender, who was developed after the arrival of František Fadrhonc. In his first season at the club, the Czech manager, moved Lakis Nikolaou from the attack to the center of defense and paired him with Ravousis, creating one of the best defensive duos in the history of the club, where the one player complemented the capabilities of the other. Ravousis, being dynamic and agile, also contributed to the team's scoring, usually in set-pieces in the opponent's area. He was a key player in AEK's campaign to the semi-finals of the UEFA Cup in 1977. In the 12 seasons at AEK, he won 2 Championships and 2 Greek Cups including a domestic double in 1978. During his spell at the club he also served as a mentor to the younger Stelios Manolas.

On 5 August 1984 Ravousis was released from AEK and signed for Levadiakos. After four seasons at the club of Livadeia, he retired as a footballer in the summer of 1988, at the age of 34.

== International career ==
Ravousis played with Greece in 22 matches, in the period between 1976 and 1981. He made his debut on 10 November 1976 under Lakis Petropoulos in a friendly match against Austria, held in Kavala. He was a member of the team in the final phase of UEFA Euro 1980 in Italy, where competed against Germany

== Managerial career ==
Immediately after his retirement, Ravousis started his managerial career in 1988, as the assistant manager of Dušan Bajević at AEK Athens, in a period where the team played amazing football and won 4 championships and 1 cup. With Bajević leaving for Olympiacos in the summer of 1996, the owner of the club, Michalis Trochanas appointed Ravousis as Bajević's successor at the bench of the team. Yet again AEK played excellent football and won the cup and the super cup, reached the quarter-finals of the UEFA Cup Winners' Cup, while finishing at the 2nd place in the league. That season Ravousis defeated his "teacher" Bajević in 3 of the 4 matches they faced each other. Trochanas created problems for Ravousis made him leave after the end of the season. After AEK, Ravousis sat on the bench of various smaller clubs, such as Paniliakos, Panetolikos, Veria, AEK Larnaca, Akratitos and Marko until 2005, where he stayed away from the football benches.

== Career statistics ==
=== Club ===
Appearances and goals by club, season and competition
Club	Season	League (Note: Also includes play-off matches.)			Greek Cup		Europe		Balkans Cup		Total	
Club	Season	Division	Apps	Goals	Apps	Goals	Apps	Goals	Apps	Goals	Apps	Goals
AEK Athens	1972–73	Alpha Ethniki	16	0	1	0	0	0	0	0	17	0
AEK Athens	1973–74	Alpha Ethniki	27	0	2	0	0	0	0	0	29	0
AEK Athens	1974–75	Alpha Ethniki	22	0	1	0	0	0	0	0	23	0
AEK Athens	1975–76	Alpha Ethniki	18	0	2	0	1	0	0	0	21	0
AEK Athens	1976–77	Alpha Ethniki	34	1	3	0	10	0	0	0	47	1
AEK Athens	1977–98	Alpha Ethniki	30	0	6	0	4	0	0	0	40	0
AEK Athens	1978–79	Alpha Ethniki	30	0	7	2	4	0	0	0	41	2
AEK Athens	1979–80	Alpha Ethniki	34	0	3	0	2	0	0	0	39	0
AEK Athens	1980–81	Alpha Ethniki	21	1	5	1	0	0	1	0	27	2
AEK Athens	1981–82	Alpha Ethniki	8	0	0	0	0	0	0	0	8	0
AEK Athens	1982–83	Alpha Ethniki	8	0	1	0	2	0	0	0	11	0
AEK Athens	1983–84	Alpha Ethniki	16	0	2	0	1	0	0	0	19	0
Levadiakos	1984–85	Beta Ethniki					0	0	0	0	0	0
Levadiakos	1985–86	Beta Ethniki					0	0	0	0	0	0
Levadiakos	1986–87	Beta Ethniki					0	0	0	0	0	0
Levadiakos	1987–88	Alpha Ethniki	12	0			0	0	0	0	12	0
Career total			276	2	33	3	24	0	1	0	334	5

=== International ===
Appearances and goals by national team and year
National team	Year	Apps	Goals
Greece	1976	1	0
Greece	1977	3	0
Greece	1978	11	0
Greece	1979	1	0
Greece	1980	4	0
Greece	1981	2	0
Total		22	0

== Honours ==
=== As a player ===
AEK Athens

- Alpha Ethniki: 1977–78, 1978–79
- Greek Cup: 1977–78, 1982–83

=== As a manager ===
AEK Athens

- Greek Cup: 1996–97
- Greek Super Cup: 1996
