= Ilias Chatzieleftheriou =

Greek footballer (born 1952)

Personal information
- Full name: Ilias Chatzieleftheriou
- Date of birth: 10 May 1952 (age 74)
- Place of birth: Drama, Greece
- Height: 1.76 m (5 ft 9 1/2 in)
- Position: Forward

Senior career*
Years	Team	Apps	(Gls)
1967–1976	Doxa Dramas		
1976–1982	Iraklis		
1982–1984	Apollon Kalamarias		
1984–1985	PAS Giannina		
1985–1986	Agrotikos Asteras		
Total			(180)
- * Club domestic league appearances and goals

Ilias Chatzieleftheriou (Greek: Ηλίας Χατζηελευθερίου; born 10 May 1952) is a Greek footballer who played as an attacking midfielder. He holds the title of the top scorer in the history of the Greek Super League 2 of all time, with 152 goals(one more than Christos Chatziskoulidis), which he scored mainly with the colors of Doxa Dramas (where he also started playing sports at the age of 10), but also with Iraklis, Apollon Kalamarias, PAS Giannina and Agrotikos Asteras, from 1967 to 1986.{He could have had a more important career in the Greek Super League, if his career had not been interrupted by a serious injury he suffered - as a player of Iraklis - in the final of the Greek Cup (1980), against Kastoria, due to the exit of Nikos Sarganis. In the first division, Chatzieleftheriou scored 28 goals with Iraklis and Apollon Kalamarias.

In recent years, he has been president of the Doxa Drama veterans' football club.
