= Giannis Mousouris =

Greek footballer

Personal information
- Full name: Ioannis Mousouris
- Date of birth: 28 January 1951 (age 75)
- Place of birth: Piraeus, Greece
- Height: 1.78 m (5 ft 10 in)
- Positions: Right back; right midfielder; striker

Youth career
- –1970: Peramaikos
- 1970–1971: Argonaftis Piraeus

Senior career*
Years	Team	Apps	(Gls)
1971–1975	Ethnikos Piraeus	84	(17)
1975–1977	AEL	72	(40)
1977–1982	AEK Athens	121	(16)
1982–1983	Veria		
1983–1984	Rodos		
1984–1985	Korinthos		
Total		277	(73)
- * Club domestic league appearances and goals

Giannis Mousouris (Greek: Γιάννης Μουσούρης; born 28 January 1951) is a Greek former professional footballer who played as right back. Mousouris started his professional career at Ethnikos Piraeus, where he played for 4 years before moving to AEL. In 1977, he was transferred to AEK Athens, where he won 2 championships and a domestic double. From 1982 to 1985, he played for a season to Veria, Rodos and Korinthos respectively, befored ending his career.

== Club career ==
Born and raised in Piraeus, Mousouris started his career at the local club of Peramaikos. In 1970 he moved to Argonaftis Piraeus and with his appearances, he didn't take long to sign in one of the most famous clubs in the area, Ethnikos Piraeus in 1971. In the academies of Ethnikos, he enacted with football on a systematic level and there he had the chance to work under two British coaches, Vic Buckingham and John Mortimore, who, although being managers of the men's team, worked twice a week with the infrastructure departments. Thus, from early on he learned to work hard in training and this helped to promote him to the first team in the summer of 1971. Competing as a striker, the young Mousouris found himself competing alongside players such as Michalis Kritikopoulos and Takis Chatziioannoglou for a position in the team's offensive line. At that time, the Thessalian group of companies, BIOCARPET which has taken over the wheel at AEL, since the beginning of the 70s, decided to strengthen the team's roster, in order to elevate the club and make them permanent in the first division. Among the transfer moves of the time, was the acquisition of Mousouris from Ethnikos in the summer of 1975.

Mousouris continued to impress with his performances in the second division that caught the eye of the manager of AEK Athens, František Fadrhonc. This resulted in an arrangement of a friendly between AEL and AEK on 26 May 1977 exclusively for Fadrhonc to see Mousouris up close. The match took place in the evening as the floodlights at the Alcazar Stadium were inaugurated that day. Fadrhonc crystallised his positive opinion of Mousouris and after the lengthy efforts by the owner of the "yellow-blacks", Loukas Barlos with the agents of AEL, who wanted to sell Mousouris to PAOK, he reached an agreement. Thus on 26 July 1977 he was transferred to AEK for a fee of 2.5 million drachmas.

The start of Mousouris in the "double-headed eagle" was indulgently impressive. In the first 6 matches, he scored 5 goals and everyone was talking about the club's new top scorer. Despite his impressive start, however, Zlatko Čajkovski, who had meanwhile replaced Fadrhonc in the technical leadership of the club, saw in Mousouris other gifts and virtues and he relocated him to the right side of the defensive line. Although Mousouris preferred playing in the offense, being completely happy with the conditions at AEK and realizing that with the return of the then injured Dušan Bajević and the duo he formed alongside Thomas Mavros in attack seemed unshakable, he accepted the change of his position without any complaints. Čik's choice was fully justified as Mousouris, possessing great speed and stride and having the attacking skills, developed into an irreplaceable modern right full-back, a pioneer for the era who, whenever was at the offense, he did not miss the opportunity to score. In his career at AEK he won 2 consecutive Championships and 1 Greek Cup including a domestic double in 1978. Leaving AEK in the summer of 1982, he played for three consecutive seasons in Veria, Rodos and Korinthos, until he retired in 1985.

== After football ==
Although Mousouris obtained a coaching diploma, he never got involved in coaching, refusing to compromise with the bad practices of the field. Since 2002, he has been working professionally with the flower shop he owns in Perivolaki square in Nikaia.

== Honours ==
AEK Athens

- Alpha Ethniki: 1977–78, 1978–79
- Greek Cup: 1977–78

Individual

- Beta Ethniki top scorer: 1976–77 (North Group)
