= Ole Skouboe =

Danish footballer (born 1949)

Personal information
- Date of birth: 6 September 1949 (age 77)
- Place of birth: Gjørup, Denmark
- Position: Forward

Senior career*
Years	Team	Apps	(Gls)
1969–1972	IK Skovbakken		
1972–1975	Hvidovre IF		
1975–1976	Helsingborgs IF		
1977–1980	Aris		
1980–1981	Kolding IF		
1981	Fort Lauderdale		
1981	Houston		
1982–1983	IK Skovbakken		
1983–1984	HB Thorshavn		
1984–1985	Aris		
1985	Hvidovre IF		

International career
1973–1974	Denmark U-21	3	(0)
1973–1980	Denmark	6	(0)

Managerial career
- 1982–1983: IK Skovbakken
- 1983–1984: HB Thorshavn
- 1984–1985: Aris (assistant)
- 1986–1989: GÍ Gøta
- 1990–1991: Larvik Turn & IF
- 1992–1993: FK Jerv
- 1993: IF Fram Larvik
- 1994: Viborg FF (caretaker)
- 1996: Hobro IK
- 2003–2004: Aris
- 2012–2013: Valdres FK
- * Club domestic league appearances and goals

Ole Skouboe (born 6 September 1949) is a Danish former football player and manager who played as a forward. He later worked as a journalist at Nordjyske Medier.
