= Tasos Konstantinou =

Cypriot footballer (1951–2019)

- Tasos Konstantinou with AEK Athens

Personal information
- Full name: Anastasios Konstantinou
- Date of birth: 11 March 1951
- Place of birth: Paliometocho, Cyprus
- Date of death: 27 October 2019 (aged 68)
- Place of death: Athens, Greece
- Height: 1.80 m (5 ft 11 in)
- Position: Forward

Youth career
- 1963–1966: Fulham U18
- 1966–1968: EPA Larnaca

Senior career*
Years	Team	Apps	(Gls)
1968–1972	EPA Larnaca		
1972–1980	AEK Athens	195	(52)
1980–1981	Atromitos	14	(0)
1981–1982	Vyzas Megara		

International career
1970–1980	Cyprus	13	(1)

Managerial career
- 1989–1990: Peramaikos
- * Club domestic league appearances and goals

Tasos Konstantinou (Greek: Τάσος Κωνσταντίνου; 11 March 1951 – 27 October 2019), simply known as "Tasos", was a Cypriot professional footballer who played as a forward.

== Early life ==
Born in Paliometocho, 20 kilometers southwest of Nicosia, Konstantinou was a member of a football family as his three brothers Charis and Chabis and Andreas Assiotis played for APOEL, Olympiakos Nicosia and ASIL respectively. In 1959 at the age of 8 he followed his parents and siblings in the family migration to London, where he joined the U18 team of Fulham. When in 1966 EPA Larnaca visited the English capital for friendly matches and were impressed by the 15-year-old Konstantinou and they and offered him an open-date plane ticket to return to Cyprus and join their youth team.

== Club career ==
Konstantinou was promoted to the men's team of EPA Larnaca in 1968, where he won the championship in 1970, while he emergetd as the top scorer of the league with 15 goals and was named player of the season at the age of 19. The following season, Konstantinou played his first European appearances in the heavy defeats against Borussia Mönchengladbach for the European Cup.

On 27 July 1972, at the age of 21, Konstantinou traveled to Greece and was transferred to AEK Athens for a fee of 600,000 drachmas. He was quickly established as a regular in the squad. He had the chance to be partnered alongside great players of the club, such as Mimis Papaioannou, Georgios Dedes, Walter Wagner, Thomas Mavros and Dušan Bajević in the offensive line, while as a penalty kick specialist, he was the main player that took the executions. On 20 April 1975, in the derby against Panathinaikos, he was subbed on at the 92nd minute and a minute later he scored the winner with a penalty, in an episodic 4–3 at home. He scored his first international goals with AEK in the 3–1 win over Inter Bratislava, on 5 November 1975, scoring a brace within 2 minutes. On 12 May 1976, he scored at the home defeat for the Greek Cup. by 2–3 against Olympiacos from the spot after he just came in the match. On 29 September 1976 in Moscow, for the second leg of the first round of the UEFA Cup, the match was sent to overtime and in the final minute, AEK won a penalty with Konstantinou was to undertake the execution. The unruffled Tasos set up the ball on the spot and executed Gontar, sending AEK to the next round. There they came against Derby County and on 3 November 1976 he scored in the epic away 2–3 win of the "yellow-blacks". That season the team managed to reach to the semi-finals of the tournament. He was the scorer in one of the two goals of his team in the 2–0 win against Panathinaikos at home on 5 March 1978. On 17 May 1978 he also scored once against Olympiacos in the emphatic 6–1 victory for the semi-finals of the cup. He was one of the key players in the largest victory of the club in the European Cup, with the imposig 6–1 over Porto scoring one of the goals. In the next round on 18 October 1978, he scored the only goal for his team in a 1–2 defeat at home against the Nottingham Forest of Brian Clough. He also scored in the cup final against Panionios, giving the lead to AEK from early on, however the club of Nea Smyrni turned the tie of the match and won by 3–1. During his 8-year presence at the club, he won two consecutive championships and a Cup, including a domestic double in 1978.

He left AEK and on 19 December 1980 he moved to Atromitos until the end of the season. The following season Konstantinou joined Vyzas Megara in the second division, where he ended his football career in 1982.

== International career ==
Konastantinou played 13 times for Cyprus and scored 1 goal.

== After football ==
Konstantinou after the end of his football career, whenever he was given the opportunity, he participated in events of the veterans' Association of AEK Athens. On 11 September 2008, a friendly match between the teams of the Professional Footballers' Associations of Greece and Cyprus was held in his honour at the GSZ Stadium. Tasos played with both teams and after the end of the match he was awarded for his contribution to Cypriot and Greek football. He left Cyprus for a period and he lived in Athens working at a section of the AEK academies at Lagonisi.

Konstantinou died in 2019 at the age of 68 after facing serious health issues. His name was given to the Kalyvia Stadium, with the Municipality of Saronikos accepting with the proposal of the AEK Veterans Association.

== Honours ==
EPA Larnaca

- Cypriot First Division: 1969–70

AEK Athens

- Alpha Ethniki: 1977–78, 1978–79
- Greek Cup: 1977–78

Individual

- Cypriot First Division top scorer: 1969–70
