= Christos Chatziskoulidis =

Greek footballer (1952–2010)

Christos Chatziskoulidis (Greek: Χρήστος Χατζησκουλίδης; 3 December 1952 – 19 January 2010) was a Greek footballer.

== Career ==
Born in Piraeus, Chatziskoulidis began playing football for Apollon Renti F.C. and Atromitos Piraeus F.C. in the local Piraeus championships, but was most successful playing for Egaleo F.C., and was the second all-time scorer in the Greek second tier with 150 goals. He left Egaleo in 1985, and would play for Akratitos F.C. and other lower league clubs before retiring.
