= Takis Nikoloudis =

Greek footballer and manager

Personal information
- Full name: Dimitrios Nikoloudis
- Date of birth: 26 August 1951 (age 75)
- Place of birth: Thessaloniki, Greece
- Height: 1.84 m (6 ft 0 in)
- Position: Midfielder

Youth career
- –1968: Iraklis

Senior career*
Years	Team	Apps	(Gls)
1968–1976	Iraklis	245	(78)
1976–1979	AEK Athens	98	(39)
1979–1982	Olympiacos	70	(11)
1982–1983	AEK Athens	36	(2)
1983	→ Inter-Montréal (loan)	3	(0)
1983–1984	Apollon Kalamarias	20	(4)
1984–1986	Levadiakos		
Total		472	(86)

International career
1971	Greece U21		
1971–1980	Greece	22	(4)
1972–1979	Greece military	11	(2)

Managerial career
- 1988–1989: Korinthos
- 1989: Veria
- 1992–1993: Panelefsiniakos
- 1993–1994: AO Chania
- * Club domestic league appearances and goals

Dimitris "Takis" Nikoloudis (Greek: Δημήτρης "Τάκης" Νικολούδης; born 26 August 1951) is a Greek former professional footballer who played as a midfielder and a former manager.

== Club career ==
=== Iraklis ===
Nikoloudis was involved in sports from a young age, joining Iraklis. According to the customs of the time, the young athletes were involved in more than one sport within the club, until they chose which one to focus on. Thus, apart from football, Nikoloudis was also active in basketball, even playing for the youth team of Iraklis. His talent in football led him to focus on the sport and, after his participation in all the infrastructure teams of the club, he was promoted to the men's team of Iraklis in 1969.

Playing as a holding midfielder, he impressed with his clever game despite his young age. He played with Iraklis for eight consecutive seasons, being one of their best players. However, his career at Iraklis was tarnished when his name was involved in the bribery case. On 28 May 1975, shortly before the semi-final of the Cup between Iraklis and Panathinaikos at Kaftanzoglio Stadium, the former Panathinaikos and Iraklis player, Giorgos Rokidis, following the orders of Antonis Mantzavelakis, an agent of Panathinaikos, visited the team of Iraklis at the hotel, offering money to Nikoloudis and Chaliampalias to have reduced performance in the match. During his Rokidis was holding a bouquet and thus the case was named as the "flower case". The management of Iraklis excluded the two players from the match squad as "disciplinary offense". A judicial process followed, where the guilt of all was documented and at the meeting and vote of the Special Committee of the HFF, Panathinaikos was acquitted due to doubts due to the vote of Giorgos Andrianopoulos, while Rokidis and Chaliampalias were banned for life. For Nikoloudis there was leniency and acquittal with the mitigating factor of his young age. This case caused a rupture in the relations of Nikoloudis and the management of the club, with the player being out of favor and not competing in the Cup final, when they won the trophy against Olympiacos.

=== AEK Athens ===
On 31 July 1976 he was transferred to AEK Athens for a fee of 3.5 million drachmas.. Nikoloudis immediately adjusted in the team and under the manager, František Fadrhonc he became an integral player in their midfield. On 15 September 1976, Nikoloudis scored his first goal, introducing to the people of AEK his "thunderbolt" free kicks and opened the score at the UEFA Cup game against Dynamo Moscow at home in a 2–0 win. In the next round of same tournament he also scored another free kick, this time against Derby County equalizing the score in an epic 3–2 away win. On 25 March 1979, he scored a brace in the away win against Panachaiki. On 8 April 1979, Nikoloudis scored with a power shot in the area the decider goal against Panathinaikos and three minutes later he was expelled alongside Livathinos, after a fierce fight between the players. During his spell at the club he won the domestic double in the season 1978 and the Championship in 1979, while he was a key member of the team that reached the semi-finals of the UEFA Cup in 1977.

The summer of 1979, found the owner of AEK, Loukas Barlos, in a difficult financial situation, trying to maintain the club's great roster at the time. One night Barlos met by chance the president of Olympiacos, Stavros Daifas. The first cited his financial difficulties to the latter. That eventually brought the transfer of Nikoloudis to the red and whites in December 1979 for the fee of 6.5 million drachmas.

=== Later years ===
On 11 May 1980, his goal against Panathinaikos at Karaiskakis Stadium shaped the final 1–0 which gave Olympiacos his first professional title, sent Olympiacos to a play-off match for the championship. In the match which took place at Volos, the red and whites won with 2–0 against Aris and won their first professional title, as well. With Olympiacos, he won 3 straight championships and 1 Cup including a domestic double in 1981.

In the summer of 1982, the return of Zlatko Čajkovski to AEK Athens' bench was combined with the return of Nikoloudis to the club. His return became official on 25 July, when he was acquired from Olympiacos alonside his teammate, Christos Arvanitis for a total fee of 12 million drachmas. However, he was a shadow of his former self from his first spell at the club. In June 1983, before the end of the season, he left to Canada to briefly play for Inter-Montréal in the 1983 Canadian Professional Soccer League, but the club folded midway through the season, due to heavy financial losses. Upon his return to Greece, one month later and with AEK having won the Greek Cup, his role at the team was decreased.

He eventually was transferred to Apollon Kalamarias on 9 December 1983 for 1 million drachmas. In Apollon he played for a season alongside his brother, Grigoris and the two of them contributed in keeping the team in the first division. Afterwards, Nikoloudis competed with Levadiakos in the second division until the summer of 1986, when he retired as a footballer.

== International career ==
Nikoloudis was a member of Greece U21, which in 1971 won the Balkan Youth Championship, while with the military team he finished at the 3rd place in the World Military Cup in 1972.

He made his debut with Greece, on April 7, 1971, in the friendly 0–1 defeat to Bulgaria at home, playing a total of 22 times and scoring 4 goals. Captain of the national team for years, he was an integral part of the qualifying team of Alketas Panagoulias. His best moment with the Greece was on September 12, 1979, when in the 26th minute of the match, after his collaboration with Giorgos Delikaris, against Soviet Union, he scored 1-0 and with this as the final result, the team qualified, for the first time in its history, to the final stage of a major international event, the UEFA Euro 1980 in Italy in which it competed in the only match in which the national team got a point, the 0–0 draw with the eventual champions West Germany.

== Managerial career ==
Nikoloudis was the manager of Veria for a brief period in 1989.

== After football ==
Nikoloudis lives permanently in Thessaloniki and has been involved in the business of five-a-side football fields.

== Personal life ==
His brother Grigoris was also a football player, who played at Alpha Ethniki, with Makedonikos and Apollon Kalamarias.

== Style of play ==
Nikoloudis played as a central midfielder or as an attacking midfielder. Possessing high-level technical virtues combined with his clever plays, he presented himself on the pitch as a player–leader who led the team masterfully, always playing with his head up. All of the above was accompanied by his power shot that often took the chance to try, especially from free kicks. Nikoloudis' free kicks on the contrary of the "banana" free kicks often seen by skilled players, where the wall of defenders and the goalkeeper are misled by the elliptical trajectory of the ball, were straight forward and unleashed with tremendous power, so that they were characterized as "thunderbolts".

== Honours ==
Iraklis

- Greek Cup: 1975–76

AEK Athens

- Alpha Ethniki: 1977–78, 1978–79
- Greek Cup: 1977–78, 1982–83

Olympiacos

- Alpha Ethniki: 1979–80, 1980–81, 1981–82
- Greek Cup: 1980–81

Individual

- Greek Cup top scorer: 1975

Greece U21

- Balkan Youth Championship: 1971
