= 1978–79 Alpha Ethniki =

43rd season of top-tier football league in Greece

Alpha Ethniki
- Season: 1978–79
- Champions: AEK Athens; 7th Greek title
- Relegated: Kavala; Egaleo; Panserraikos
- European Cup: AEK Athens
- UEFA Cup: Olympiacos; Aris
- Cup Winners' Cup: Panionios
- Matches: 306
- Goals: 792 (2.59 per match)
- Top goalscorer: Thomas Mavros (31 goals)

The 1978–79 Alpha Ethniki was the 43rd season of the highest football league of Greece. The season began on 3 September 1978 and ended on 3 June 1979. AEK Athens won their second consecutive and seventh Greek title.

The point system was: Win: 2 points - Draw: 1 point.

== Teams ==
Promoted from 1977–78 Beta Ethniki	Relegated from 1977–78 Alpha Ethniki
Rodos; AEL	Pierikos; Veria

Location of teams in 1978–79 Alpha Ethniki

== League table ==
Pos	Team	Pld	W	D	L	GF	GA	GD	Pts	Qualification or relegation
1	AEK Athens (Note: AEK Athens pronounced champions, because Olympiacos did not show up for the play-off match.) (C)	34	25	6	3	90	30	+60	56	Qualification for European Cup first round
2	Olympiacos	34	26	4	4	63	27	+36	56	Qualification for UEFA Cup first round
3	Aris	34	22	6	6	63	26	+37	50	Qualification for UEFA Cup first round
4	PAOK	34	18	9	7	73	23	+50	45	
5	Panathinaikos	34	14	10	10	46	37	+9	38	
6	Iraklis	34	12	10	12	51	46	+5	34	
7	OFI	34	14	6	14	37	42	−5	34	
8	Ethnikos Piraeus	34	14	4	16	36	50	−14	32	
9	Kastoria	34	10	11	13	31	42	−11	31	
10	Apollon Athens	34	10	9	15	37	42	−5	29	
11	Rodos	34	13	3	18	50	62	−12	29	
12	AEL	34	12	5	17	32	53	−21	29	
13	Panionios	34	9	10	15	31	44	−13	28	Qualification for Cup Winners' Cup first round
14	PAS Giannina	34	9	10	15	38	51	−13	28	
15	Panachaiki	34	9	9	16	27	37	−10	27	
16	Kavala (R)	34	12	3	19	34	56	−22	27	Relegation to Beta Ethniki
17	Egaleo (R)	34	10	6	18	33	57	−24	26	Relegation to Beta Ethniki
18	Panserraikos (R)	34	4	5	25	16	63	−47	13	Relegation to Beta Ethniki

Source: RSSSF
Rules for classification: 1st points; 2nd decision match; 3rd head-to-head goal difference.
(C) Champions; (R) Relegated

== Results ==
Home \ Away	AEK	AEL	APA	ARIS	EGA	ETH	IRA	KAS	KAV	OFI	OLY	PNC	PAO	PAN	PNS	PAOK	PAS	ROD
AEK Athens		4–2	2–0	1–1	5–0	5–1	5–1	2–1	7–0	2–0	0–0	4–0	1–0	4–0	5–0	3–2	7–2	5–2
AEL	0–1		1–0	0–1	1–0	2–1	2–1	1–2	2–1	2–1	1–2	1–0	1–0	2–1	2–0	1–1	1–0	1–1
Apollon Athens	1–3	4–0		1–2	2–0	1–0	3–1	1–1	4–2	1–0	0–2	2–0	1–1	1–0	2–0	0–0	1–1	2–0
Aris	2–1	2–1	3–2		6–1	5–0	2–1	7–2	3–1	5–0	2–0	2–0	2–0	1–0	1–0	1–0	3–0	2–1
Egaleo	0–2	0–0	3–0	0–0		1–3	1–1	2–1	3–0	1–0	1–2	1–0	0–0	1–0	3–2	1–0	2–0	2–1
Ethnikos Piraeus	3–1	1–0	1–1	2–0	4–2		1–0	1–3	1–0	1–0	0–1	0–2	2–1	1–1	2–1	1–1 (Note: Ethnikos vs PAOK originally finished 2-2. The match was replayed after PAOK's appeal because the referee count an irregular goal for Ethnikos)	0–0	4–1
Iraklis	2–3	2–0	1–1	0–4	6–1	3–1		2–1	3–0	3–0	1–1	0–0	2–2	0–0	2–1	0–0	0–0	8–1
Kastoria	1–1	1–0	1–1	0–0	2–1	0–1	0–0		0–1	3–1	1–0	1–1	0–0	0–0	1–0	1–0	2–1	1–0
Kavala	1–2	3–2	1–0	2–2	2–1	0–2	1–0	1–0		4–0	0–1	1–0	0–0	2–0	2–0	0–3	3–0	2–0
OFI	0–0	2–0	2–1	1–1	3–1	2–0	1–0	1–0	2–0		3–3	1–0	2–0	3–0	4–0	1–1	2–0	1–0
Olympiacos	0–1	4–3	2–1	2–0	2–0	2–0	4–0	0–0	1–0	2–0		2–0	1–0	2–1	5–0	1–0	2–1	2–1
Panachaiki	1–2	0–0	2–0	2–0	2–1	1–0	3–0	1–1	0–0	2–0	0–1		0–0	3–1	0–0	0–0	2–0	1–2
Panathinaikos	2–2	3–2	2–1	1–0	1–1	1–0	1–2	4–1	2–1	2–0	2–3	2–0		2–0	3–1	2–2	1–0	4–0
Panionios	0–1	1–1	1–1	0–0	1–0	2–1	1–2	2–0	3–0	0–0	2–3	3–2	4–2		1–0	2–1	0–0	2–0
Panserraikos	2–5	0–1	1–1	0–1	2–1	0–1	0–4	0–0	1–0	0–1	1–3	1–0	0–1	0–0		0–1	2–2	1–0
PAOK	2–1	4–0	3–0	1–0	4–0	5–0	1–1	4–2	4–1	3–1	2–0	3–0	3–0	5–0	5–0		5–0	6–1
PAS Giannina	1–1	5–0	2–0	2–0	1–0	2–0	1–2	3–0	2–1	1–1	0–1	2–2	0–2	1–1	2–0	1–1		2–1
Rodos	0–1	4–1	1–0	1–2	1–1	3–0	3–0	2–1	5–1	3–1	3–4	3–0	2–2	2–1	1–0	1–0	3–1	

Source: RSSSF
Legend: Blue = home team win; Yellow = draw; Red = away team win.

== Top scorers ==
Rank	Player	Club	Goals
1	(Greece) Thomas Mavros	AEK Athens	31
2	(Greece) Manolis Kottis	Rodos	24
2	(Socialist Federal Republic of Yugoslavia) Dušan Bajević	AEK Athens	24
4	(Argentina) Óscar Álvarez	Panathinaikos	15
4	(Greece) Kostas Orfanos	PAOK	15
4	(Brazil) Neto Guerino	PAOK	15
7	(Greece) Giorgos Ananiadis	Aris	14
8	(Greece) Takis Nikoloudis	AEK Athens	12
8	(Greece) Giannis Pathiakakis	Panionios	12
8	(Greece) Giorgos Orfanidis	Iraklis	12
8	(Greece) Petros Karavitis	Olympiacos	12
8	(Greece) Dinos Kouis	Aris	12

== Attendances ==
Olympiacos drew the highest average home attendance in the 1978–79 Alpha Ethniki.

#	Team	Average attendance
1	Olympiacos	24,552
2	AEK Athens	14,972
3	Panathinaikos	14,621
4	PAOK	14,394
5	Aris	11,970
6	Ethnikos Piraeus	9,833
7	AEL	7,454
8	Iraklis	7,097
9	Apollon Athens	5,750
10	Panionios	5,713
11	Panachaiki	5,522
12	Egaleo	5,213
13	PAS Giannina	4,947
14	OFI	4,528
15	Kavala	4,270
16	Rodos	3,825
17	Panserraikos	2,446
18	Kastoria	2,339
