= 1977–78 Alpha Ethniki =

42nd season of top-tier football league in Greece

Alpha Ethniki
- Season: 1977–78
- Champions: AEK Athens; 6th Greek title
- Relegated: Pierikos; Veria
- European Cup: AEK Athens
- Cup Winners' Cup: PAOK
- UEFA Cup: Panathinaikos; Olympiacos
- Matches: 306
- Goals: 733 (2.4 per match)
- Top goalscorer: Thomas Mavros (22 goals)

The 1977–78 Alpha Ethniki was the 42nd season of the highest football league of Greece. The season began on 11 September 1977 and ended on 28 May 1978. AEK Athens won their sixth Greek title and their first one in seven years.

The point system was: Win: 2 points - Draw: 1 point.

== Teams ==
Promoted from 1976–77 Beta Ethniki	Relegated from 1976–77 Alpha Ethniki
Egaleo; Veria	Panetolikos; Atromitos

Location of teams in 1977–78 Alpha Ethniki

== League table ==
Pos	Team	Pld	W	D	L	GF	GA	GD	Pts	Qualification or relegation
1	AEK Athens (C)	34	21	11	2	74	27	+47	53	Qualification for European Cup first round
2	PAOK	34	16	14	4	48	24	+24	46	Qualification for Cup Winners' Cup first round (Note: Since AEK Athens also won the Greek Cup and were qualified for the 1978–79 European Cup, the Cup runners-up, PAOK earned a spot in the Cup Winners' Cup first round.)
3	Panathinaikos	34	19	7	8	63	25	+38	45	Qualification for UEFA Cup first round
4	Olympiacos	34	17	10	7	46	20	+26	44	Qualification for UEFA Cup first round
5	PAS Giannina	34	14	10	10	45	39	+6	38	
6	Aris	34	12	12	10	39	35	+4	36	
7	Ethnikos Piraeus	34	11	10	13	36	45	−9	32	
8	OFI	34	9	14	11	32	47	−15	32	
9	Iraklis	34	9	12	13	46	50	−4	30	
10	Panachaiki	34	8	14	12	38	50	−12	30	
11	Egaleo	34	13	4	17	32	51	−19	30	
12	Apollon Athens	34	10	9	15	31	40	−9	29	
13	Kavala	34	11	7	16	31	50	−19	29	
14	Panserraikos	34	11	6	17	31	38	−7	28	
15	Kastoria	34	10	8	16	33	42	−9	28	
16	Panionios	34	8	12	14	29	42	−13	28	
17	Pierikos (R)	34	10	6	18	46	56	−10	26	Relegation to Beta Ethniki
18	Veria (Note: Veria were deducted 10 points.) (R)	34	10	8	16	33	52	−19	18	Relegation to Beta Ethniki

Source: RSSSF
Rules for classification: 1st points; 2nd decision match; 3rd head-to-head goal difference.
(C) Champions; (R) Relegated

== Results ==
Home \ Away	AEK	APA	ARIS	EGA	ETH	IRA	KAS	KAV	OFI	OLY	PNC	PAO	PAN	PNS	PAOK	PAS	PIE	VER
AEK Athens		2–0	4–2	3–1	1–1	3–1	1–0	3–0	1–1	2–0	4–0	2–0	5–1	2–1	2–0	3–0	5–2	6–2
Apollon Athens	0–0		1–1	2–1	0–0	2–2	1–0	2–0	3–1	0–2	1–1	0–1	3–0	2–0	1–1	1–0	1–2	2–0
Aris	2–0	2–0		1–0	1–1	0–0	2–0	2–0	3–0	0–0	2–1	0–0	2–0	2–0	0–0	1–1	1–2	1–1
Egaleo	2–4	0–1	1–0		0–1	1–1	1–0	3–3	1–0	0–4	0–0	1–0	1–0	2–0	2–1	4–2	2–1	2–0
Ethnikos Piraeus	1–6	2–1	3–1	1–2		1–0	2–0	2–0	1–1	1–1	3–1	0–1	1–2	1–0	1–1	0–2	3–2	1–1
Iraklis	3–3	1–0	3–0	1–0	3–1		2–2	4–1	1–1	2–2	2–1	1–0	3–1	2–2	0–1	5–1	1–1	1–2
Kastoria	1–1	0–1	0–0	3–0	1–3	1–0		4–1	2–0	1–1	2–3	1–1	1–0	1–0	1–1	1–0	3–1	3–0
Kavala	2–3	1–0	1–0	3–0	0–2	2–0	1–0		3–1	0–0	2–1	1–3	0–0	1–0	0–0	1–0	2–1	1–0
OFI	0–0	2–1	1–1	1–1	2–0	1–0	0–0	0–0		0–0	1–0	1–0	3–1	1–1	2–1	1–1	2–1	5–2
Olympiacos	1–0	3–0	1–2	2–0	2–1	3–1	2–0	2–0	3–0		3–0	1–2	1–1	2–0	0–0	2–0	2–0	1–0
Panachaiki	0–0	0–0	1–3	1–0	4–2	2–2	2–2	2–1	1–1	0–0		0–1	1–1	1–0	2–0	1–0	2–2	3–0
Panathinaikos	1–1	1–1	0–0	5–1	6–0	5–0	5–0	2–0	3–0	1–0	2–1		5–0	2–1	0–0	2–3	3–0	6–1
Panionios	0–1	4–3	2–2	0–1	0–0	0–0	1–0	2–0	3–0	0–0	1–1	0–0		0–1	0–0	0–0	4–1	2–0
Panserraikos	0–2	2–0	4–0	0–1	1–0	1–0	0–1	2–2	2–1	1–0	1–1	0–1	2–1		1–2	1–1	1–0	0–0
PAOK	1–1	3–0	2–1	4–1	1–0	1–1	2–1	3–1	5–0	1–0	1–1	3–1	0–0	2–1		1–0	3–0	2–0
PAS Giannina	0–0	3–0	2–1	1–0	1–0	3–2	3–1	1–1	1–1	1–0	6–3	1–0	2–0	3–1	1–1		2–0	0–0
Pierikos	0–2	2–1	3–1	4–0	0–0	4–1	1–0	2–0	1–1	1–2	4–0	1–2	1–2	0–2	1–1	2–2		2–0
Veria	1–1	0–0	0–2	1–0	0–0	1–0	3–0	3–0	3–0	2–3	0–0	3–1	1–0	1–2	1–3	2–1	2–1	

Source: RSSSF
Legend: Blue = home team win; Yellow = draw; Red = away team win.

== Top scorers ==
Rank	Player	Club	Goals
1	(Greece) Thomas Mavros	AEK Athens	22
2	(Argentina) Óscar Álvarez	Panathinaikos	18
3	(Greece) Achilleas Aslanidis	Panathinaikos	15
3	(Greece) Takis Nikoloudis	AEK Athens	15
3	(Greece) Kostas Orfanos	PAOK	15
6	(Greece) Dimitrios Gesios	Iraklis	13
6	(Greece) Mimis Spetzopoulos	Panachaiki	13
8	(Argentina) Alfredo Glasman	PAS Giannina	11
8	(Greece) Giorgos Kalambakas	Pierikos	11
8	(Greece) Thomas Liolios	Panionios	11
8	(Greece) Ilias Chatziskoulidis	Egaleo	11

== Attendances ==
AEK Athens drew the highest average home attendance in the 1977–78 Alpha Ethniki.

#	Team	Average attendance
1	AEK Athens	15,572
2	Olympiacos	15,092
3	PAOK	11,404
4	Panathinaikos	10,558
5	Iraklis	8,942
6	Ethnikos Piraeus	7,932
7	Aris	7,241
8	Panachaiki	5,096
9	Panionios	4,950
10	OFI	4,352
11	Kavala	4,155
12	Apollon Athens	4,034
13	Veria	4,017
14	Egaleo	3,885
15	PAS Giannina	3,850
16	Pierikos	2,676
17	Panserraikos	2,540
18	Kastoria	2,370
