= 1977–78 Greek Football Cup =

1977–78 Greek Cup
Tournament details
- Country: Greece
- Teams: 58

Final positions
- Champions: AEK Athens (8th title)
- Runners-up: PAOK

Tournament statistics
- Matches played: 57
- Goals scored: 180 (3.16 per match)
- Top goal scorer(s): Dušan Bajević (9 goals)

The 1977–78 Greek Football Cup was the 36th edition of the Greek Football Cup. The competition culminated with the Greek Cup Final, held at Karaiskakis Stadium, on 4 June 1978. The match was contested by AEK Athens and PAOK, with AEK Athens winning by 2–0.

== Calendar ==
Round	Date(s)	Fixtures	Clubs	New entries
First Round	21, 22 December 1977 & 12 January 1978	29	58 → 29	58
Second Round	1, 2 February 1978	13	29 → 16	none
Round of 16	8, 9 March 1978	8	16 → 8	none
Quarter-finals	19, 20 April 1978	4	8 → 4	none
Semi-finals	17, 18 May 1978	2	4 → 2	none
Final	4 June 1978	1	2 → 1	none

== Knockout phase ==
In the knockout phase, teams play against each other over a single match. If the match ends up as a draw, extra time will be played. If a winner doesn't occur after the extra time the winner emerges by penalty shoot-out.
The mechanism of the draws for each round is as follows:

- There are no seedings, and teams from the same group can be drawn against each other.

== First round ==
Team 1	Score	Team 2
Kavala	1–0	Proodeftiki
Panathinaikos	9–0	Thyella Serres
Panthrakikos	4–2	Chalkida
Olympiacos Volos	6–0	Atromitos Piraeus
Fostiras	0–1	Olympiacos
PAO Agios Dimitrios	2–1	Niki Volos
Panionios	0–0 (4–2 p)	Irodotos
AEL	2–1	Almopos Aridea
PAS Giannina	1–0	Panarkadikos
Iraklis	1–0	Olympiacos Liosia
Edessaikos	1–1 (1–2 p)	Rodos
Pandramaikos	3–0	Ilisiakos
Ethnikos Asteras	1–2	Aris
PAOK	6–1	Levadiakos
Panserraikos	0–0 (4–1 p)	Atromitos
Panachaiki	3–1	Makedonikos
Veria	1–0	Kastoria
A.F.C. Patra	1–1 (3–4 p)	Apollon Athens
Korinthos	5–0	Egaleo
Naoussa	0–2	Kallithea
Panetolikos	4–2	Elassona
Ethnikos	4–0	Anagennisi Karditsa
AE Mesolongi	0–1	Trikala
Xanthi	1–0	Doxa Drama
Anagennisi Epanomi	2–1	Kilkisiakos
Panelefsiniakos	4–2 (a.e.t.)	Ionikos
AEK Athens	6–1	AO Chania
OFI	5–0	Pierikos
Apollon Kalamarias	3–0	Lamia

== Bracket ==
Second round
Panelefsiniakos (bye)
PAO Agios Dimitrios	0
AEL	1
Panathinaikos	0
AEK Athens	1
Panionios (bye)
Panachaiki (bye)
Trikala	2
Olympiacos	5
PAS Giannina	3
Rodos	2
Xanthi	1
Panserraikos	0
Pandramaikos	1
Apollon Athens	0
Kavala (a.e.t.)	1
OFI	0
Ethnikos Piraeus	1
Panetolikos	0
Anagennisi Epanomi	0
Aris	1
Iraklis	1
Kallithea	0
PAOK	4
Olympiacos Volos	1
Korinthos	0
Veria	2
Panthrakikos (p)	0(4)
Apollon Kalamarias	0(3)

Round of 16
Panelefsiniakos (a.e.t.)	4
AEL	2
AEK Athens	3
Panionios	0
Panachaiki	0(3)
Olympiacos (p)	0(4)
PAS Giannina	5
Xanthi	0
Pandramaikos	0
Kavala	1
Ethnikos Piraeus	2
Aris	5
Iraklis	0
PAOK	1
Veria	4
Panthrakikos	1

Quarter-finals
Panelefsiniakos	2
AEK Athens	4
Olympiacos (a.e.t.)	2
PAS Giannina	1
Kavala	2
Aris	3
PAOK	5
Veria	0

Semi-finals
AEK Athens	6
Olympiacos	1
Aris	0
PAOK (a.e.t.)	1

Final
AEK Athens	2
PAOK	0

== Second round ==
Team 1	Score	Team 2
Ethnikos Piraeus	1–0	Panetolikos
Korinthos	0–2	Veria
Panathinaikos	0–1	AEK Athens
PAS Giannina	3–2	Rodos
Iraklis	1–0	Kallithea
Trikala	2–5	Olympiacos
Kavala	1–0 (a.e.t.)	OFI
Pandramaikos	1–0	Apollon Athens
PAO Agios Dimitrios	0–1	AEL
PAOK	4–1	Olympiacos Volos
Xanthi	1–0	Panserraikos
Panthrakikos	0–0 (4–3 p)	Apollon Kalamarias
Anagennisi Epanomi	0–1	Aris
Panionios	bye	
Panachaiki	bye	
Panelefsiniakos	bye	

== Round of 16 ==
Team 1	Score	Team 2
AEK Athens	3–0	Panionios
Panelefsiniakos	4–2 (a.e.t.)	AEL
PAS Giannina	5–0	Xanthi
Panachaiki	0–0 (3–4 p)	Olympiacos
Ethnikos Piraeus	2–5	Aris
Iraklis	0–1	PAOK
Pandramaikos	0–1	Kavala
Veria	4–1	Panthrakikos

== Quarter-finals ==
Team 1	Score	Team 2
PAOK	5–0	Veria
Olympiacos	2–1 (a.e.t.)	PAS Giannina
Panelefsiniakos	2–4	AEK Athens
Kavala	2–3	Aris

== Semi-finals ==
=== Summary ===
Team 1	Score	Team 2
AEK Athens	6–1	Olympiacos
Aris	0–1 (a.e.t.)	PAOK

=== Matches ===
17 May 1978
16:30 EEST (UTC+3)

AEK Athens	6–1	Olympiacos
Bajević 14'; Mavros 19', 76', 89'; Konstantinou 36'; Nikoloudis 57'	Report	Spence 12'

AEK Stadium, Nea Filadelfeia
Attendance: 30,000
Referee: Theodoros Tsanaklidis (Kavala)

17 May 1978

Aris	0–1 (a.e.t.)	PAOK
		Orfanos 112'

Kleanthis Vikelidis Stadium, Thessaloniki
Attendance: 22,900
Referee: Nikos Fakis (Athens)

== Final ==
4 June 1978
21:00 EEST

AEK Athens	2–0	PAOK
Bajević 50'; Mavros 80'	Report (pages 4,5)

Karaiskakis Stadium, Piraeus
Attendance: 23,483
Referee: Nikos Zlatanos (Thessaloniki)
