= 1980–81 AEK Athens F.C. season =

AEK Athens
1980–81 season
- Chairman: Loukas Barlos (until 7 June); Andreas Zafiropoulos
- Manager: Miltos Papapostolou
- Stadium: AEK Stadium
- Alpha Ethniki: 2nd
- Greek Cup: Semi-finals
- Balkans Cup: Group Stage
- Top goalscorer: League: Dušan Bajević (12); All: Thomas Mavros; Dušan Bajević (18 each)
- Highest home attendance: 36,766 vs Panathinaikos (30 November 1980)
- Lowest home attendance: 2,885 vs Flamurtari (8 October 1980)
- Average home league attendance: 17,168
- Biggest win: AEK Athens 6–2 Egaleo; AEK Athens 5–1 Kavala; AEK Athens 4–0 Korinthos; AEK Athens 4–0 PAOK
- Biggest defeat: Olympiacos 6–0 AEK Athens
Home colours	Away colours

The 1980–81 season was the 57th season in the existence of AEK Athens F.C. and the 22nd consecutive season in the top flight of Greek football. They competed in the Alpha Ethniki, the Greek Cup and the Balkans Cup. The season began on 7 September 1980 and finished on 14 June 1981.

== Kits ==
Supplier: Adidas

Home	Away

== Overview ==
AEK entered the decade, essentially closing one of their most successful historical periods, since this season was the last year of Loukas Barlos in the administration of the club. That was the second championship since the establishment of the professional football in Greece. AEK did not compete in any UEFA competitions this year and thus they played in the Balkans Cup instead.

With their former player that won the 1962–63 championship, Miltos Papapostolou on the bench, AEK started the league ideally achieving 6 wins in a row. Among others, they beat PAOK at Toumba Stadium and Olympiacos at Nea Filadelfeia Stadium and thus they were deemed by many as favorite for the title from early on. During that season AEK set the all time ticket record at home, after the 36,766 tickets that were sold in the league game against Panathinaikos. However, the continuation was not proportionate.

The second round of the Championship was not good for the team, culminating in the derby with Olympiacos at Karaiskakis Stadium. AEK went down in the match having 2 points less than the first Olympiacos and were looking for the victory that would bring them on the top of the table. Nevertheless, they play a terrible game and a disastrous second half, where they conceded 5 goals in 27 minutes and experienced one of the worst defeats in their history by 6–0. However, the defeat and the match was overshadowed by the tragic events at gate 7 of the stadium, where the fans, trying to leave the field, were trapped and many were trampled, resulting in the death of 21 people and the injury of more than 50 people. Despite AEK having by far the best attack of the league with 63 goals, they were betrayed by their mediocre defensive performance and at the end of the season AEK finished at the second place five points behind Olympiacos, but were not qualified for any European competition, carrying a ban from the previous season.

In the first round of the Cup, AEK eliminated Egaleo winning them by 6–2 at home. Afterwards, they faced the title-holder, Kastoria at home for the second round and they qualified for the round of 16, beating them by 2–0. There, they faced Panathinaikos and despite losing by 3–2 at the first leg, they managed to win the by 1–0 at home and got the qualification on away goals. In the quarter-finals they were drawn against Aris. The first leg ended in a 2–2 draw at home, but with the 0–1 win away from home in the rematch they passed through the club of Thssaloniki only to be drawn against the other club of the city, PAOK for the semi-finals. AEK were eliminated with defeats at both legs without managing to score a single goal.

"I do not want to take from AEK, I just wanted to give. I am not an investor and I probably do not have a place in modern football. I thank God for the moments he gave me at AEK. This club is the most important thing I've had in my life"

— Statements of Loukas Barlos on leaving AEK

In the Balkans Cup, AEK were placed in the group with Velež Mostar and Flamurtari. Since all three clubs finished on par with 2 wins and 2 defeats, Velež Mostar were qualified to the final of the institution, since they had a better goal ratio.

When the season was over and after seven years of ownership, Loukas Barlos left AEK Athens as a result of the dire financial situation that came from his involvement with the club, but also due to his inability to adapt to the new model of professional football, fearing alienation through the professionalism that was entering into the field of football. Moreover, Dušan Bajević, one of the stars of the team and their top scorer in the season, left with him as well.

== Management team ==
Position	Staff
Manager	(Greece) Miltos Papapostolou
Assistant manager	(Czechoslovakia) František Fadrhonc
Goalkeeping coach	(Greece) Stelios Serafidis
Fitness coach	(Czechoslovakia) František Fadrhonc
Academy director	(Czechoslovakia) František Fadrhonc
Academy manager	(Greece) Stelios Serafidis
Head of Medical	(Greece) Lakis Nikolaou

== Players ==
=== Squad information ===
NOTE: The players are the ones that have been announced by the AEK Athens' press release. No edits should be made unless a player arrival or exit is announced. Updated 14 June 1981, 23:59 UTC+3.

Player	Nat.	Position(s)	Date of birth (Age)	Signed	Previous club	Transfer fee	Contract until
Goalkeepers
Nikos Christidis	(Greece)	GK	2 August 1944 (aged 36)	1976	(Greece) Aris	₯1,500,000	1984
Lakis Stergioudas	(Greece)	GK	11 December 1952 (aged 28)	1972	(Greece) Niki Polygyros	₯36,000	1985
Spyros Ikonomopoulos	(Greece)	GK	25 July 1959 (aged 21)	1979	(Greece) AEK Athens U20	—	1984
Dimitris Alafogiannis	(Greece)	GK	26 October 1960 (aged 20)	1981	(Greece) AEK Athens U20	—	1986
Defenders
Lakis Nikolaou (Vice-captain)	(Greece)	CB / RB / ST / RW	17 July 1949 (aged 31)	1971	(Greece) Atromitos	₯600,000	1982
Giannis Mousouris	(Greece)	RB / RM / ST	26 January 1951 (aged 30)	1977	(Greece) AEL	₯2,500,000	1982
Giorgos Rigas	(Greece)	CB / RB / DM	6 December 1953 (aged 27)	1980	(Greece) Kavala	Free	1982
Michalis Tzirakis	(Greece)	CB / RB / RM	6 March 1954 (aged 27)	1980	(Greece) OFI	₯8,000,000	1985
Giorgos Kalogeropoulos	(Greece)	LB	14 September 1954 (aged 26)	1979	(Greece) Panionios	Free	1984
Petros Ravousis (Captain)	(Greece)	CB / RB	1 October 1954 (aged 26)	1972	(Greece) Aetos Skydra	Free	1985
Vangelis Paraprastanitis	(Greece)	LB / CB / DM	10 February 1955 (aged 26)	1980	(Greece) Trikala	₯4,000,000	1985
Stelios Manolas	(Greece)	RB / CB	13 July 1961 (aged 19)	1980	(Greece) AEK Athens U20	—	1984
Lysandros Georgamlis	(Greece)	RB / CB / DM / LB	25 February 1962 (aged 19)	1980	(Greece) AEK Athens U20	—	1985
Midfielders
Kostas Eleftherakis	(Greece)	AM / CM / RM	18 July 1950 (aged 30)	1980	(Greece) Panathinaikos	Free	1981
Franjo Vladić	(Socialist Federal Republic of Yugoslavia)	AM / RM / LM / SS / CM	19 October 1950 (aged 30)	1979	(Socialist Federal Republic of Yugoslavia) Velež Mostar	Free	1981
Petros Karavitis	(Greece)	DM / CB / CM / LB / LM / LW	11 March 1952 (aged 29)	1980	(Greece) Olympiacos	Free	1983
Christos Ardizoglou	(Greece) (Israel)	RM / LM / RW / LW / AM / RB / LB	25 March 1953 (aged 28)	1974	(Greece) Apollon Athens	₯12,000,000	1982
Spyros Thodis	(Greece)	CM / AM / DM	23 July 1955 (aged 25)	1979	(Greece) Anagennisi Karditsa	₯4,000,000	1984
Vangelis Vlachos	(Greece)	AM / CM / RM / LM	6 January 1962 (aged 19)	1979	(Greece) AEK Athens U20	—	1984
Forwards
Dimitrios Gesios	(Greece)	ST	24 October 1948 (aged 32)	1980	(Greece) Iraklis	₯1,500,000	1985
Dušan Bajević	(Socialist Federal Republic of Yugoslavia)	ST / SS	10 December 1948 (aged 32)	1977	(Socialist Federal Republic of Yugoslavia) Velež Mostar	Free	1981
Dimitrios Papadopoulos	(Greece)	ST / RW	1 March 1950 (aged 31)	1980	(Greece) OFI	Free	1982
Thomas Mavros	(Greece)	ST / LW	31 May 1954 (aged 27)	1976	(Greece) Panionios	₯10,000,000	1983
Manolis Kottis	(Greece)	ST / LW / RW	25 January 1955 (aged 26)	1980	(Greece) Rodos	₯7,500,000	1985
Thomas Stafylas	(Greece)	ST / RW / LW / RM / LM	4 April 1958 (aged 23)	1979	(Greece) AEK Athens U20	—	1984
Left during Winter Transfer Window
Dimitris Argyros	(Greece)	CB / LB	6 December 1948 (aged 32)	1979	(Greece) Kastoria	₯7,000,000	1984
Tasos Konstantinou	(Cyprus)	RW / SS / ST / RM / AM	11 March 1951 (aged 30)	1972	(Cyprus) EPA Larnaca	₯600,000	1981
Giorgos Chatziioannidis	(Greece)	ST	1 June 1961 (aged 20)	1979	(Greece) AEK Athens U20	—	1984

== Transfers ==
=== In ===
==== Summer ====
Pos.	Player	From	Fee	Date	Contract Until	Source
DF	(Greece) Giorgos Rigas	(Greece) Kavala	Free transfer	2 July 1980	30 June 1985	
DF	(Greece) Michalis Tzirakis	(Greece) OFI	₯8,000,000	1 July 1980	30 June 1985	
DF	(Greece) Vangelis Paraprastanitis	(Greece) Trikala	₯4,000,000	1 July 1980	30 June 1985	
MF	(Greece) Giorgos Vlantis	(Greece) Panachaiki	Loan return	1 July 1980	30 November 1984	
MF	(Greece) Kostas Eleftherakis	(Greece) Panathinaikos	Free transfer	11 July 1980	30 June 1981	
FW	(Cyprus) Panikos Hatziloizou	(Greece) Atromitos	Loan termination	12 September 1980	30 June 1984	
FW	(Greece) Dimitrios Gesios	(Greece) Iraklis	₯1,500,000	7 July 1980	30 June 1985	
FW	(Greece) Dimitrios Papadopoulos	(Greece) OFI	Free transfer	14 July 1980	30 June 1985	
FW	(Greece) Manolis Kottis	(Greece) Rodos	₯7,500,000^{[a]}	11 July 1980	30 June 1985	
FW	(Greece) Thomas Stafylas	(Greece) Acharnaikos	Loan return	1 July 1980	30 June 1984	

==== Winter ====
Pos.	Player	From	Fee	Date	Contract Until	Source
GK	(Greece) Dimitris Alafogiannis	(Greece) AEK Athens U20	Promotion	15 May 1981	30 June 1986	
DF	(Greece) Lysandros Georgamlis	(Greece) AEK Athens U20	Promotion	16 December 1980	30 November 1985	
MF	(Greece) Petros Karavitis	(Greece) Olympiacos	Free transfer	17 December 1980	30 June 1983	
MF	(Greece) Dionysis Tsamis	(Greece) Korinthos	Loan return	1 December 1980	31 December 1980	

=== Out ===
==== Summer ====
Pos.	Player	To	Fee	Date	Source
DF	(Greece) Aris Damianidis	(Greece) Olympiacos	Contract termination	1 August 1980	
DF	(Greece) Babis Intzoglou	(Greece) Diagoras	Contract termination	18 August 1980	
DF	(Greece) Dimitris Kotsos	Free agent	Contract termination	31 July 1980	
MF	(Greece) Christos Kalaitzidis	(Greece) Rodos	Free transfer	31 July 1980	
MF	(Greece) Stelios Kaselakis	(Greece) Rodos	Free transfer	31 July 1980	
FW	(Cyprus) Panikos Hatziloizou	(Cyprus) Aris Limassol	Free transfer	12 September 1980	
FW	(Greece) Stefanos Zografos	(Greece) Vyzas Megara	Contract termination	1 July 1980	

==== Winter ====
Pos.	Player	To	Fee	Date	Source
DF	(Greece) Dimitris Argyros	(Greece) Kastoria	Contract termination	15 December 1980	
MF	(Greece) Dionysis Tsamis	(Greece) Korinthos	₯1,000,000^{[b]}	15 December 1980	
FW	(Cyprus) Tasos Konstantinou	(Greece) Atromitos	Contract termination	19 December 1980	

Notes

a. plus Christos Kalaitzidis and Stelios Kaselakis as exchange.
b. Plus a conduction of a friendly match between the two clubs.

=== Loan out ===
==== Summer ====
Pos.	Player	To	Fee	Date	Until	Option to buy	Source
DF	(Greece) Stavros Letsas	(Greece) Panelefsiniakos	Free	31 July 1980	30 June 1981	✗	
DF	(Greece) Panagiotis Stylianopoulos	(Greece) Atromitos	Free	30 July 1980	30 June 1981	✗	
MF	(Greece) Giorgos Vlantis	(Greece) APS Patrai	Free	1 July 1980	30 June 1981	✗	
FW	(Cyprus) Panikos Hatziloizou	(Greece) Atromitos	Free	30 July 1980	30 June 1981	✗	

==== Winter ====
Pos.	Player	To	Fee	Date	Until	Option to buy	Source
FW	(Greece) Giorgos Chatziioannidis	(Greece) PAS Giannina	Free	15 December 1980	30 June 1981	✗	

=== Contract renewals ===
Pos.	Player	Date	Former Exp. Date	New Exp. Date	Source
GK	(Greece) Lakis Stergioudas	27 January 1981	30 June 1981	30 June 1985	
DF	(Greece) Petros Ravousis	31 January 1981	30 June 1981	30 June 1985	
FW	(Cyprus) Tasos Konstantinou	22 July 1980	30 June 1980	31 June 1981	
FW	(Socialist Federal Republic of Yugoslavia) Dušan Bajević	1 August 1980	30 June 1980	31 June 1981	

=== Overall transfer activity ===
==== Expenditure ====
Summer: ▼ ₯21,000,000

Winter: ▼ ₯0

Total: ▼ ₯21,000,000

==== Income ====
Summer: ▲ ₯0

Winter: ▲ ₯1,000,000

Total: ▲ ₯1,000,000

==== Net Totals ====
Summer: ▼ ₯21,000,000

Winter: ▲ ₯1,000,000

Total: ▼ ₯20,000,000

== Pre-season and friendlies ==
18 July 1980 Friendly	NTSV Strand 08	1–2	AEK Athens	Timmendorfer Strand
18:30 EEST (UTC+3)	Neuman 86'	Report	Kottis 63'; Chatziioannidis 75'	Stadium: Strand-Arena; Attendance: 500

23 July 1980 Friendly	TSV Nord Harrislee	2–2	AEK Athens	Harrislee
18:30 EEST (UTC+3)	Markman 50', 56'	Report	Thodis 76'; Chatziioannidis 83'	Stadium: Sportzentrum Holmberg; Attendance: 2,000; Referee: Gerd Zimmermann (West Germany)

26 July 1980 Hertha BSC Tournament	Fenerbahçe	0–0 (6–5 p)	AEK Athens	Berlin
15:30 EEST (UTC+3)	Yigit (yellow card) 22'	Report	Rigas (yellow card) 20'	Stadium: Olympiastadion; Attendance: 5,000; Referee: Willard (West Germany)
	Penalties
	Pamiroğlu (penalty scored); Ertürk (penalty scored); Yigit (penalty scored); Çetiner (penalty scored); Yetkiner (penalty missed); Togay (penalty scored); Arabacıbaşı (penalty scored)		(penalty scored) Thodis; (penalty scored) Ravousis; (penalty scored) Papadopoulos; (penalty scored) Eleftherakis; (penalty missed) Paraprastanitis; (penalty scored) Vlachos; (penalty missed) Mousouris

27 July 1980 Hertha BSC Tournament	Tennis Borussia Berlin	1–1 (3–4 p)	AEK Athens	Berlin
12:30 EEST (UTC+3)	Kottis 36'	Report	Grunenberg 39'; Marczewski (penalty missed) 63'	Stadium: Olympiastadion; Attendance: 12,000; Referee: Uwe Kasperowski (Germany)
	Penalties
	Stolzenburg (penalty scored); Fraßmann (penalty scored); Grunenberg (penalty missed); Karadžić (penalty scored); Malura (penalty missed); Schütte (penalty missed)		(penalty scored) Thodis; (penalty missed) Papadopoulos; (penalty scored) Vladić; (penalty missed) Chatziioannidis; (penalty scored) Eleftherakis; (penalty scored) Tzirakis

30 July 1980 Friendly	AEK Athens	2–2	Twente	Nea Filadelfeia
21:00 EEST (UTC+3)	Bajević 29'; Ardizoglou 48'	Report	Bleuming 5'; Thoresen 19' (pen.); Pasveer (yellow card) 59' (yellow-red card) 59'	Stadium: AEK Stadium; Attendance: 11,378; Referee: Giorgos Voulgaris (Athens)
Note: At the 59th minute, the officials of Twente, not accepting the dismissal of their goalkeeper, Eddie Pasveer due to delay, left the pitch with the team, but with the intervention of the assistant manager of AEK, František Fadrhonc, they returned 6 minutes later with Andre van Gerven, who had been subbed off at the half-time, returning under the posts.

4 August 1980 Friendly	AEK Athens	3–1	Fortuna Düsseldorf	Nea Filadelfeia
21:00 EEST (UTC+3)	Vladić 21'; Ardizoglou (yellow card) 39', (goal) 73'; Kottis 58'	Report	Bommer 29'	Stadium: AEK Stadium; Attendance: 10,480; Referee: Christos Charalampidis (Athens)

10 August 1980 Friendly	Iraklis	5–0	AEK Athens	Thessaloniki
20:30 EEST (UTC+3)	Kalabakas 4', 50', 60'; Orfanidis (penalty missed) 9'; Papaioannou 16'; Chatzieleftheriou 30'	Report		Stadium: Kaftanzoglio Stadium; Attendance: 4,887; Referee: Antonis Vassaras (Thessaloniki)
Note: At the bench of AEK was the academy manager, Stelios Serafidis. In response, the manager of Iraklis, Kostas Karapatis refused to coach his team and Telis Batakis took over in his place.

11 August 1980 Friendly	AEK Athens	2–2	Chelsea	Nea Filadelfeia
21:00 EEST (UTC+3)	Thodis 41'; Ardizoglou 61'; Bajević (penalty missed) 88'	Report	Walker 42', (yellow card) 65'; Bumstead (red card) 67'; Fillery 81' (pen.)	Stadium: AEK Stadium; Attendance: 12,000; Referee: Giorgos Saraliotis (Kavala)

13 August 1980 Friendly	AEK Athens	1–4	Baník Ostrava	Nea Filadelfeia
21:00 EEST (UTC+3)	Bajević 45'	Report	Radimec 31'; Albrecht 32'; Lička 60', 75'	Stadium: AEK Stadium; Attendance: 6,902; Referee: Giorgos Ballis (Athens)

18 August 1980 Friendly	AEK Athens	3–2	KSK Beveren	Nea Filadelfeia
21:30 EEST (UTC+3)	Bajević 15'; Eleftherakis 31'; Gesios 73'	Report	Weihrauch 60'; Albert 66'	Stadium: AEK Stadium; Attendance: 4,860; Referee: Konstantinos Vlastaris (Athens)
Note: The match started with a 30-minute delay due to rainfall.

23 August 1980 Friendly	Ethnikos Piraeus	0–0	AEK Athens	Piraeus
21:00 EEST (UTC+3)		Report		Stadium: Karaiskakis Stadium; Attendance: 10,000; Referee: Dimitris Pantzalis (Piraeus)

27 August 1980 Friendly	AEK Athens	0–0	PAOK	Nea Filadelfeia
21:00 EEST (UTC+3)		Report		Stadium: AEK Stadium; Attendance: 11,994; Referee: Nikos Fakis (Athens)

1 September 1980 Friendly	Aris	1–3	AEK Athens	Thessaloniki
20:30 EEST (UTC+3)	Vangis 46'; Michalitsos (yellow card) 62'	Report	Gesios 6'; Vladić 32'; Tzirakis (yellow card) 51'; Ravousis (yellow card) 62'; Venos 89' (o.g.)	Stadium: Kaftanzoglio Stadium; Attendance: 5,280; Referee: Nikos Zlatanos (Thessaloniki)

25 September 1980 Friendly	Al Ahly	0–0	AEK Athens	Cairo
21:15 EEST (UTC+3)		Report		Stadium: Cairo International Stadium; Attendance: 30,000; Referee: Gamal Al-Ghandour (Egypt)
Note: Mimis Papaioannou played with AEK Athens.

12 October 1980 Friendly	AEK Athens	3–2	Panionios	Nea Filadelfeia
15:30 EEST (UTC+3)	Gesios 22'; Papadopoulos 55' (pen.); Kottis 81'	Report	Chatzopoulos 38'; Pathiakakis 53'	Stadium: AEK Stadium; Attendance: 2,846; Referee: Giorgos Ballis (Athens)
Note: Hristo Bonev competed with AEK as a trial in order to sign with the club.

15 October 1980 Friendly	Kallithea	0–1	AEK Athens	Kallithea
15:30 EEST (UTC+3)		Report	Chatziioannidis 47'; Papadopoulos (penalty missed) 62'	Stadium: Grigoris Lamprakis Stadium; Attendance: 2,000; Referee: Filopoulos

3 December 1980 Friendly	AEK Athens	2–2	Stoke City	Nea Filadelfeia
15:30 EET (UTC+2)	Kottis 3'; Bajević (penalty missed) 24', 42'	Report	Munro 69'; Chapman 88'	Stadium: AEK Stadium; Attendance: 2,213; Referee: Giorgos Saraliotis (Kavala)
Note: The game was briefly interrupted at the 57th minute, due to a fierce downhill.

10 December 1980 Friendly	Veria	1–2	AEK Athens	Veria
14:30 EEST (UTC+3)	Savvidis 19'	Report	Kottis 33', 75'	Stadium: Veria Stadium; Attendance: 2,000; Referee: Kosmas Loukidis (Imathia)

26 January 1981 Friendly	AEK Athens	1–0	CSKA Sofia	Nea Filadelfeia
15:15 EET (UTC+2)	Kottis 63'	Report		Stadium: AEK Stadium; Attendance: 1,093; Referee: Konstantinos Vlastaris (Athens)
Note: At the 85th minute AEK were left with 10 players, due to the injury of Bajević.

11 March 1981 Friendly	AEK Athens	1–0	Greece U19	Nea Filadelfeia
15:30 EET (UTC+2)	Gesios 10'	Report		Stadium: AEK Stadium; Attendance: 460; Referee: Makis Germanakos (Athens)
Note: 80-minute match. Manolas, Vlachos and Georgamlis who were in the squad of Greece U19, competed against AEK.

15 March 1981 Friendly	AEK Athens	1–0	Ethnikos Piraeus	Nea Filadelfeia
15:45 EET (UTC+2)	Mavros 5'	Report		Stadium: AEK Stadium; Attendance: 2,928; Referee: Leonidas Printezis (Athens)

22 April 1981 Friendly	AEK Athens	1–0	A.E. Chalandri	Nea Filadelfeia
17:00 EEST (UTC+3)	Mousouris 80'	Report		Stadium: AEK Stadium; Referee: Dimitris Giakoumatos (Athens)
Note: The incomes of the match went to the footballer of A.E. Chalandri, Themis Papadopoulos, who suffered from cancer.

29 April 1981 Friendly	AEK Athens	10–0	AO Nea Artaki	Nea Filadelfeia
17:00 EEST (UTC+3)	Mousouris 7', 73', 87'; Gesios 11', 21', 88'; Vlachos 12'; Thodis 37'; Stafylas 56', 61'	Report		Stadium: AEK Stadium; Attendance: 5,000; Referee: Alafogiannis
Note: The officials of AEK, Alafogiannis and Tsakiroglou were the referee and the linesman of the match, respectively.

3 May 1981 Friendly	AEK Athens	0–0	PAOK	Nea Filadelfeia
17:00 EEST (UTC+3)		Report	Iosifidis (yellow card) 27'; Apostolidis (yellow card) 30'	Stadium: AEK Stadium; Attendance: 2,562; Referee: Nikos Makris (Athens)

== Competitions ==
=== Overall record ===
Competition	First match	Last match	Starting round	Final position	Record							
Competition	First match	Last match	Starting round	Final position	Pld	W	D	L	GF	GA	GD	Win %
Alpha Ethniki	7 September 1980	14 June 1981	Matchday 1	2nd	34	17	10	7	63	42	+21	50.00
Greek Cup	29 October 1980	10 June 1981	First round	Semi-finals	8	4	1	3	14	10	+4	50.00
Balkans Cup	18 September 1980	19 March 1981	Group stage	Group stage	4	2	0	2	7	7	+0	50.00
Total					46	23	11	12	84	59	+25	50.00

Last updated: 14 June 1981
Source: Competitions

=== Alpha Ethniki ===
==== League table ====
Pos	Team	Pld	W	D	L	GF	GA	GD	Pts	Qualification or relegation
1	Olympiacos (C)	34	20	9	5	47	18	+29	49	Qualification for European Cup first round
2	AEK Athens	34	17	10	7	63	42	+21	44	
3	Aris	34	16	11	7	57	33	+24	43	Qualification for UEFA Cup first round
4	PAOK	34	15	12	7	52	31	+21	42	Qualification for Cup Winners' Cup first round (Note: Since Olympiacos, winners of 1980–81 Greek Football Cup, was qualified for the 1981–82 European Cup, losing cup finalists PAOK earned a spot in the first round of the 1981–82 European Cup Winners' Cup.)
5	Panathinaikos	34	13	13	8	44	21	+23	39	Qualification for UEFA Cup first round

Source: RSSSF
Rules for classification: 1st points; 2nd decision match; 3rd head-to-head goal difference.
(C) Champions

==== Results summary ====
Overall								Home						Away					
Pld	W	D	L	GF	GA	GD	Pts	W	D	L	GF	GA	GD	W	D	L	GF	GA	GD
34	17	10	7	63	42	+21	44	13	4	0	45	14	+31	4	6	7	18	28	−10

Source: Competitive matches

==== Results by Matchday ====
Round	1	2	3	4	5	6	7	8	9	10	11	12	13	14	15	16	17	18	19	20	21	22	23	24	25	26	27	28	29	30	31	32	33	34
Ground	H	A	H	A	H	A	A	H	A	H	A	H	A	H	A	H	H	A	H	A	H	A	H	H	A	H	A	H	A	H	A	H	A	A
Result	W	W	W	W	W	W	D	D	L	W	D	D	L	W	D	D	W	L	W	L	W	D	W	W	L	W	L	W	D	W	D	D	W	L
Position	1	1	1	1	1	1	1	1	2	1	1	1	3	2	3	3	3	3	3	3	3	3	3	3	3	3	3	3	3	3	3	3	2	2

Source: Competitive matches
A = Away; H = Home; W = Win; D = Draw; L = Loss; P = Postponed

==== Matches ====
7 September 1980 1	AEK Athens	5–1	Kavala	Nea Filadelfeia
17:00 EEST (UTC+3)	Thodis 7'; Gesios 54', 69'; Bajević 78'; Eleftherakis 88'		Kakkalis 89'	Stadium: AEK Stadium; Attendance: 21,279; Referee: Makis Mersinis (Chalkidiki)

14 September 1980 2	PAOK	1–2	AEK Athens	Thessaloniki
17:00 EEST (UTC+3)	Sarafis 45'; Apostolidis (yellow card) 59'		Vlachos (yellow card) 20'; Ardizoglou 24'; Mavros 45'; Thodis (yellow card) 51'	Stadium: Kaftanzoglio Stadium; Attendance: 36,964; Referee: Vasilis Vourakis (Piraeus)

21 September 1980 3	AEK Athens	2–1	Olympiacos	Nea Filadelfeia
17:00 EEST (UTC+3)	Mavros 14', 33'; Thodis (yellow card) 43'		Papadopoulos 17'; Vamvakoulas (yellow card) 56'	Stadium: AEK Stadium; Attendance: 36,191; Referee: Giorgos Loutridis (Larissa)

28 September 1980 4	Atromitos	1–2	AEK Athens	Peristeri
15:30 EEST (UTC+3)	Paunovski (yellow card) 9', (goal) 18'; Kapousouzis (yellow card) 19'; Pantelidis (yellow card) 20'; Kapouas (yellow card) 25'		Thodis (yellow card); Paraprastanitis (yellow card) 9'; Gesios 38'; Bajević 57'	Stadium: Peristeri Stadium; Attendance: 12,799; Referee: Giannis Angelidis (Serres)

5 October 1980 5	AEK Athens	2–1	Panserraikos	Nea Filadelfeia
15:30 EEST (UTC+3)	Mavros 53'; Ravousis (yellow card) 68'; Eleftherakis 89'		Keramidas (yellow card) 60'; Batis 73'; Aivazidis (yellow card) 79'	Stadium: AEK Stadium; Attendance: 20,249; Referee: Kostas Tsouris (Thrace)

19 October 1980 6	Kastoria	2–3	AEK Athens	Kastoria
15:30 EEST (UTC+3)	Voitsidis 25'; Babović (penalty missed) 50'; Dintsikos (yellow card) 62'; Chounouzidis 73'		Mavros 10'; Ardizoglou (yellow card) 43', (goal) 70'; Ravousis (yellow card) 81'; Rigas 88'	Stadium: Municipal Stadium of Kastoria; Attendance: 5,144; Referee: Vasilis Tikmoglou (Thessaloniki)
Note: Due to punishment, Miltos Papapostolou watched game from the stands and in his place was his assistant, František Fadrhonc.

26 October 1980 7	Apollon Athens	0–0	AEK Athens	Rizoupoli
14:45 EET (UTC+2)	Vrettos (yellow card) 15'; Prokovas (yellow card) 39'		Eleftherakis (yellow card) 24'	Stadium: Rizoupoli Stadium; Attendance: 13,241; Referee: Manolis Platopoulos (Athens)

2 November 1980 8	AEK Athens	1–1	AEL	Nea Filadelfeia
14:45 EET (UTC+2)	Bajević 62'		Golantas (yellow card) 21'; Valaoras 45'	Stadium: AEK Stadium; Attendance: 20,687; Referee: Dimitris Koutoulas (Serres)

9 November 1980 9	Panachaiki	2–0	AEK Athens	Patras
14:45 EET (UTC+2)	Psarras 13'; Xanthopoulos 44'			Stadium: Panachaiki Stadium; Attendance: 10,644; Referee: Apostolos Karavasilis (Larissa)

16 November 1980 10	AEK Athens	4–0	Korinthos	Nea Filadelfeia
14:45 EET (UTC+2)	Ardizoglou 11'; Eleftherakis 25'; Bajević 39', 46'; Tzirakis (yellow card) 57'		Kalkounos (yellow card) 33'; Athanasopoulos (yellow card) 51'	Stadium: AEK Stadium; Attendance: 15,019; Referee: Giorgos Koukoulakis (Heraklion)

23 November 1980 11	Panionios	1–1	AEK Athens	Nea Smyrni
14:45 EET (UTC+2)	Kritikos (yellow card) 41'; Mavrikis 65', (yellow card) 67'		Paraprastanitis 45'; Mavros (yellow card) 53'; Vladić (yellow card) 64'	Stadium: Nea Smyrni Stadium; Attendance: 14,549; Referee: Giorgos Kounalakis (Heraklion)

30 November 1980 12	AEK Athens	0–0	Panathinaikos	Nea Filadelfeia
14:45 EET (UTC+2)	Ravousis (yellow card) 19'; Bajević (yellow card) 55'; Vlachos (yellow card) 63'; Rigas (yellow card) 74'; Ardizoglou (yellow card) 90'		Livathinos (yellow card) 33'; Ziakos (yellow card) 35'; Nicolae (red card) 85'	Stadium: AEK Stadium; Attendance: 36,766; Referee: Giorgos Kifonidis (Kavala)
Note: All time attendance record for AEK Stadium.

14 December 1980 13	PAS Giannina	3–1	AEK Athens	Ioannina
14:45 EET (UTC+2)	Papageorgiou 50'; Sofias (yellow card) 52', (goal) 89'; Papangelis (yellow card) 56'; Ananiadis 84'		Vladić (yellow card) 40'; Ravousis 59'	Stadium: Zosimades Stadium; Attendance: 8,245; Referee: Nikos Lagogiannis (Piraeus)

21 December 1980 14	AEK Athens	2–1	Doxa Drama	Nea Filadelfeia
14:45 EET (UTC+2)	Kottis 11'; Vlachos 37'		Charalampidis 54' (pen.); Papangelis (yellow card) 75'	Stadium: AEK Stadium; Attendance: 13,691; Referee: Manolis Vardakas (Kozani)

28 December 1980 15	Aris	1–1	AEK Athens	Thessaloniki
14:45 EET (UTC+2)	Kouis 38' (pen.); Ballis (yellow card) 86'		Ravousis (yellow card) 43'; Kalogeropoulos (yellow card) 74'; Rigas (yellow card) 79'; Vlachos 80'	Stadium: Aris Stadium; Attendance: 20,690; Referee: Vasilis Messalas (Patras)

4 January 1981 16	AEK Athens	0–0	Ethnikos Piraeus	Nea Filadelfeia
14:45 EET (UTC+2)	Kottidis (yellow card) 59'		Ardizoglou (yellow card) 63'	Stadium: AEK Stadium; Attendance: 19,103; Referee: Theoklis Kontzalis (Thessaloniki)

11 January 1981 17	AEK Athens	3–0	OFI	Nea Filadelfeia
14:45 EET (UTC+2)	Eleftherakis 64'; Thodis 71', (yellow card) 76'; Bajević 84'		Kirisits (yellow card) 14'; Koronakis (yellow card) 46'	Stadium: AEK Stadium; Attendance: 10,898; Referee: Giorgos Moschopoulos (Thessaloniki)

18 January 1981 18	Kavala	1–0	AEK Athens	Kavala
14:45 EET (UTC+2)	Kakkalis 49'		Ardizoglou (yellow card); Bajević (penalty missed) 62'	Stadium: Kavala National Stadium; Attendance: 5,175; Referee: Kostas Tsouris (Thrace)

1 February 1981 19	AEK Athens	4–0	PAOK	Nea Filadelfeia
15:15 EET (UTC+2)	Manolas 22'; Gesios 32'; Mavros 59', (penalty missed) 69'; Vlachos 65'			Stadium: AEK Stadium; Attendance: 21,973; Referee: Giorgos Loutridis (Larissa)

8 February 1981 20	Olympiacos	6–0	AEK Athens	Piraeus
15:15 EET (UTC+2)	Galakos 30', 54', 84'; Persias (yellow card) 48'; Kousoulakis 68'; Orfanos 75'; Vamvakoulas 80'		Manolas (yellow card) 11' (yellow-red card) 50'	Stadium: Karaiskakis Stadium; Attendance: 35,450; Referee: Dimitris Koutoulas (Serres)
Note: The biggest football tragedy in Greece occurred at the end of the game when 20 fans of Olympiacos and 1 of AEK died in their effort to get out of the gate 7 of the Stadium where they found the door closed and were trampled by passing fans.

18 February 1981 21	AEK Athens	3–0	Atromitos	Nea Filadelfeia
15:15 EET (UTC+2)	Bajević 22'; Thodis 51'; Vlachos 61'		Rymikis (yellow card) 65'; Álvarez (red card) 66'; Kapouas (yellow card) 67'; Misailidis (yellow card) 73'	Stadium: AEK Stadium; Attendance: 3,528; Referee: Nikos Lagogiannis (Piraeus)

22 February 1981 22	Panserraikos	1–1	AEK Athens	Serres
15:15 EET (UTC+2)	Anastasiadis 30', (yellow card) 35'		Bajević 82'; Paraprastanitis (yellow card) 85'	Stadium: Serres Municipal Stadium; Attendance: 6,615; Referee: Antonis Vassaras (Thessaloniki)

1 March 1981 23	AEK Athens	3–1	Kastoria	Nea Filadelfeia
15:45 EET (UTC+2)	Bajević 38', 58'; Vlachos 69'		Alexiadis (yellow card) 31'; Liolios 64'	Stadium: AEK Stadium; Attendance: 6,726; Referee: Nikos Angelakis (Thessaloniki)

22 March 1981 24	AEK Athens	3–0	Apollon Athens	Nea Filadelfeia
16:00 EET (UTC+2)	Paraprastanitis 18'; Mavros 83', (red card) 86'; Vlachos 89'		Vrettos (yellow card) 79' (yellow-red card) 86'	Stadium: AEK Stadium; Attendance: 9,972; Referee: Nikos Karathanasis (Athens)

29 March 1981 25	AEL	2–1	AEK Athens	Trikala
17:00 EEST (UTC+3)	Parafestas (yellow card); Koutas 16'; Mousouris 74' (o.g.)		Nikolaou (yellow card); Mousouris (yellow card); Bajević 44'	Stadium: Trikala Municipal Stadium; Attendance: 11,364; Referee: Giorgos Moschopoulos (Thessaloniki)

5 April 1981 26	AEK Athens	3–1	Panachaiki	Nea Filadelfeia
17:00 EEST (UTC+3)	Ardizoglou 46'; Vladić 61'; Vlachos 65'		Dalakas (yellow card) 2'; Spentzopoulos 54'	Stadium: AEK Stadium; Attendance: 12,714; Referee: Dimitris Sidiropoulos (Thessaloniki)

12 April 1981 27	Korinthos	2–1	AEK Athens	Corinth
17:00 EEST (UTC+3)	Pissas 18'; Karsiotis (yellow card) 30'; Togias 40'		Manolas (yellow card) 36'; Pittas 72' (o.g.)	Stadium: Korinthos Stadium; Attendance: 7,950; Referee: Nikos Zlatanos (Thessaloniki)

19 April 1981 28	AEK Athens	3–1	Panionios	Nea Filadelfeia
17:00 EEST (UTC+3)	Vlachos 19', 82'; Manolas (yellow card) 51'; Vladić 86'		Mavrikis (yellow card) 73'; Kaltsas 89'	Stadium: AEK Stadium; Attendance: 14,724; Referee: Leonidas Printezis (Athens)

10 May 1981 29	Panathinaikos	0–0	AEK Athens	Piraeus
21:00 EEST (UTC+3)			Manolas (yellow card) 51'; Paraprastanitis (yellow card) 83'	Stadium: Karaiskakis Stadium; Attendance: 25,387; Referee: Pantelis Argyriou (Dodecanese)
Note: Match held at Karaiskakis Stadium due to the inappropriateness of the Leoforos Alexandras Stadium which had damages caused by a strong earthquake at 24 February.

17 May 1981 30	AEK Athens	3–2	PAS Giannina	Nea Filadelfeia
17:00 EEST (UTC+3)	Gesios 28'; Bajević 38'; Eleftherakis 82'		Liakos 4'; Papageorgiou (yellow card) 6'; Kontogeorgakis 55'	Stadium: AEK Stadium; Attendance: 13,611; Referee: Thanasis Nikolitsas (Argolida)

24 May 1981 31	Doxa Drama	2–2	AEK Athens	Drama
17:30 EEST (UTC+3)	Charalampidis 46' (pen.); Strantzalis 81'		Thodis 22' (pen.); Ardizoglou 52'	Stadium: Doxa Drama Stadium; Attendance: 5,284; Referee: Theoklis Kontzalis (Thessaloniki)

31 May 1981 32	AEK Athens	4–4	Aris	Nea Filadelfeia
17:30 EEST (UTC+3)	Paraprastanitis (yellow card) 7'; Kottis 23'; Mavros 54'; Mousouris 56', 64'		Zindros (yellow card) 20', (goal) 86'; Kouis 37', 45+3' (pen.); Chatziantoniou 55'	Stadium: AEK Stadium; Attendance: 13,728; Referee: Makis Mersinis (Chalkidiki)

7 June 1981 33	Ethnikos Piraeus	0–2	AEK Athens	Piraeus
17:30 EEST (UTC+3)	Kottidis (yellow card) 33'; Siokos (yellow card) 57'		Kalogeropoulos (yellow card) 29'; Gesios 50', 73'	Stadium: Karaiskakis Stadium; Attendance: 5,551; Referee: Pounartzis (Thessaloniki)

14 June 1981 34	OFI	3–1	AEK Athens	Heraklion
18:30 EEST (UTC+3)	Karaiskos 30'; Georgiadis 31'; Drakos 66'		Mavros 18'; Kalogeropoulos (yellow card) 63'	Stadium: Theodoros Vardinogiannis Stadium; Attendance: 3,141; Referee: Kostas Dedes (Messinia)

=== Greek Cup ===
==== Matches ====
29 October 1980 First round	AEK Athens	6–2	Egaleo	Nea Filadelfeia
14:00 EET (UTC+2)	Bajević 15', 60'; Vladić 66'; Ardizoglou 76'; Mavros 82', 85'		Mavronasios (yellow card) 8'; Konstantopoulos 78'; Pigaditis 84'	Stadium: AEK Stadium; Attendance: 3,382; Referee: Panagiotis Tsolakidis (Thessaloniki)

17 December 1980 Second round	AEK Athens	2–0	Kastoria	Nea Filadelfeia
14:00 EET (UTC+2)	Thodis 18'; Kottis 38'; Bajević (red card) 47'			Stadium: AEK Stadium; Attendance: 4,003; Referee: Kanaris (Thessaloniki)

===== Round of 16 =====
7 January 1981 First leg	Panathinaikos	3–2	AEK Athens	Ampelokipoi
14:30 EET (UTC+2)	Konstantinou (yellow card); Katsiakos 25'; Tzirakis 70' (o.g.); Simeoforidis 78'	Report	Tzirakis (yellow card); Vlachos (yellow card); Ravousis 51'; Bajević 84'	Stadium: Leoforos Alexandras Stadium; Attendance: 18,094; Referee: Nikos Zlatanos (Thessaloniki)

4 February 1981 Second leg	AEK Athens	1–0 (3(a)–3 agg.)	Panathinaikos	Nea Filadelfeia
14:30 EET (UTC+2)	Gesios (yellow card) 21', (goal) 34'; Vladić (red card) 26'; Vlachos (yellow card) 80'	Report	Livathinos (red card) 21'; Kapsis (yellow card) 26'	Stadium: AEK Stadium; Attendance: 27,797; Referee: Ioannis Ioannidis (Thessaloniki)

===== Quarter-finals =====
13 May 1981 First leg	AEK Athens	2–2	Aris	Nea Filadelfeia
17:00 EEST (UTC+3)	Kottis 55', 85'; Nikolaou (yellow card) 63'	Report	Alexiou 18'; Zindros 74'; Pantziaras (yellow card) 80'	Stadium: AEK Stadium; Attendance: 12,000; Referee: Thanasis Nikolitsas (Argolida)
Note: While the match was at 1–2 the players of Aris were stalling provocatively, which annoyed the players of AEK and wild incidents occurred between them with the riot police emerging to stop them. Bajević and Firos were punished with a 3-month ban, Vladić and Pantziaras with a 2-month ban, Vlachos was punished with a month ban and AEK were punished 2 games away from home.

27 May 1981 Second leg	Aris	0–1 (2–3 agg.)	AEK Athens	Thessaloniki
17:00 EEST (UTC+3)	Tzifopoulos (yellow card) 10'; Zelelidis (yellow card) 41'	Report	Nikolaou (yellow card) 14'; Mavros 44'; Tzirakis (yellow card) 71'; Ardizoglou (yellow card) 47' (yellow-red card) 72'	Stadium: Aris Stadium; Attendance: 13,164; Referee: Kostas Dimitriadis (Piraeus)

===== Semi-finals =====
3 June 1981 First leg	PAOK	1–0	AEK Athens	Thessaloniki
21:00 EEST (UTC+3)	Kostikos 39' (pen.)	Report	Ardizoglou (penalty missed) 80'	Stadium: Toumba Stadium; Attendance: 26,674; Referee: Kostas Dedes (Messinia)

10 June 1981 Second leg	AEK Athens	0–2 (0–3 agg.)	PAOK	Chalcis
17:00 EEST (UTC+3)	Mousouris (yellow card) 32'	Report	Damanakis (yellow card) 20', (goal) 51'; Georgopoulos 81'	Stadium: Municipal Stadium of Chalkida; Attendance: 12,736; Referee: Manolis Vardakas (Kozani)
Note: Match held at Chalcis because AEK had a stadium ban due to incidents in the match against Aris in the previous round.

=== Balkans Cup ===
==== Group Α ====
Pos	Team	Pld	W	D	L	GF	GA	GR	Pts	Qualification	VEL	AEK	FLA
1	(Socialist Federal Republic of Yugoslavia) Velež Mostar	4	2	0	2	8	6	1.333	4	Advance to Final	—	2–0	4–1
2	(Greece) AEK Athens	4	2	0	2	7	7	1.000	4		3–1	—	3–2
3	(Albania) Flamurtari	4	2	0	2	7	9	0.778	4		2–1	2–1	—

Source: rsssf.com
Rules for classification: 1) points; 2) goal average; 3) number of goals scored

===== Matches =====
18 September 1980 1	Velež Mostar (Socialist Federal Republic of Yugoslavia)	2–0	(Greece) AEK Athens	Mostar, Yugoslavia
17:00 EEST (UTC+3)	Skočajić 49'; Matijević 89'	Report	Eleftherakis (yellow card) 15'	Stadium: Bijeli Brijeg; Attendance: 13,000; Referee: Stjepan Glavina (Yugoslavia)

8 October 1980 2	AEK Athens (Greece)	3–2	(Albania) Flamurtari	Athens, Greece
16:00 EEST (UTC+3)	Paraprastanitis (yellow card) 36'; Stafylas 75'; Kottis 77'; Rigas 78'; Konstantinou (penalty missed) 87'	Report	Çuri 14', (yellow card) 51'; Kovaçi 36'	Stadium: AEK Stadium; Attendance: 2,885; Referee: Cumhur Demir (Turkey)

5 March 1981 3	AEK Athens (Greece)	3–1	(Socialist Federal Republic of Yugoslavia) Velež Mostar	Athens, Greece
15:00 EET (UTC+2)	Mavros 53', 58', 65'	Report	Mulahasanović (yellow card) 14'; Međedović 25'	Stadium: AEK Stadium; Referee: Georgescu (Romania)

19 March 1981 4	Flamurtari (Albania)	2–1	(Greece) AEK Athens	Vlorë, Albania
16:00 EET (UTC+2)	Çuri 21'; Kovaçi 50'	Report	Eleftherakis 86'	Stadium: Flamurtari Stadium; Attendance: 18,000; Referee: Ivan Yosifov (Bulgaria)

== Statistics ==
=== Squad statistics ===
As of 14 June 1981

No.	Pos	Player	Alpha Ethniki		Greek Cup		Balkans Cup		Total	
No.	Pos	Player	Apps	Goals	Apps	Goals	Apps	Goals	Apps	Goals
Goalkeepers
—	GK	(Greece) Nikos Christidis	4	0	0	0	3	0	7	0
—	GK	(Greece) Lakis Stergioudas	5	0	2	0	0	0	7	0
—	GK	(Greece) Spyros Ikonomopoulos	26	0	6	0	1	0	33	0
—	GK	(Greece) Dimitris Alafogiannis	0	0	0	0	0	0	0	0
Defenders
—	DF	(Greece) Lakis Nikolaou	12	0	4	0	0	0	16	0
—	DF	(Greece) Giannis Mousouris	13	2	3	0	4	0	20	2
—	DF	(Greece) Giorgos Rigas	19	1	6	0	3	1	28	2
—	DF	(Greece) Michalis Tzirakis	22	0	5	0	4	0	31	0
—	DF	(Greece) Giorgos Kalogeropoulos	8	0	3	0	2	0	13	0
—	DF	(Greece) Petros Ravousis	21	1	5	1	1	0	27	2
—	DF	(Greece) Vangelis Paraprastanitis	32	2	7	0	1	0	40	2
—	DF	(Greece) Stelios Manolas	23	1	5	0	4	0	32	1
—	DF	(Greece) Lysandros Georgamlis	3	0	2	0	1	0	6	0
Midfielders
—	MF	(Greece) Kostas Eleftherakis	23	5	3	0	3	1	29	6
—	MF	(Socialist Federal Republic of Yugoslavia) Franjo Vladić	21	2	4	1	2	0	27	3
—	MF	(Greece) Petros Karavitis	7	0	2	0	0	0	9	0
—	MF	(Greece) Christos Ardizoglou	26	5	7	1	0	0	33	6
—	MF	(Greece) Spyros Thodis	28	4	7	1	3	0	38	5
—	MF	(Greece) Vangelis Vlachos	29	9	6	0	2	0	37	9
Forwards
—	FW	(Greece) Dimitrios Gesios	22	7	6	1	2	0	30	8
—	FW	(Socialist Federal Republic of Yugoslavia) Dušan Bajević	27	12	6	3	1	0	34	15
—	FW	(Greece) Dimitrios Papadopoulos	6	0	1	0	2	0	9	0
—	FW	(Greece) Thomas Mavros	22	9	6	3	1	3	29	15
—	FW	(Greece) Manolis Kottis	16	2	6	3	3	1	25	6
—	FW	(Greece) Thomas Stafylas	11	0	1	0	4	1	16	1
Left during Winter Transfer Window
—	DF	(Greece) Dimitris Argyros	0	0	0	0	0	0	0	0
—	FW	(Cyprus) Tasos Konstantinou	1	0	1	0	2	0	4	0
—	FW	(Greece) Giorgos Chatziioannidis	0	0	0	0	1	0	1	0

=== Goalscorers ===
As of 14 June 1981
The list is sorted by competition order when total goals are equal, then by position and then alphabetically by surname.

Rank	Pos.	Player	Alpha Ethniki	Greek Cup	Balkans Cup	Total
1	FW	(Socialist Federal Republic of Yugoslavia) Dušan Bajević	12	3	0	15
1	FW	(Greece) Thomas Mavros	9	3	3	15
3	MF	(Greece) Vangelis Vlachos	9	0	0	9
4	FW	(Greece) Dimitrios Gesios	7	1	0	8
5	MF	(Greece) Christos Ardizoglou	5	1	0	6
5	MF	(Greece) Kostas Eleftherakis	5	0	1	6
5	FW	(Greece) Manolis Kottis	2	3	1	6
8	MF	(Greece) Spyros Thodis	4	1	0	5
9	MF	(Socialist Federal Republic of Yugoslavia) Franjo Vladić	2	1	0	3
10	DF	(Greece) Giannis Mousouris	2	0	0	2
10	DF	(Greece) Vangelis Paraprastanitis	2	0	0	2
10	DF	(Greece) Petros Ravousis	1	1	0	2
10	DF	(Greece) Giorgos Rigas	1	0	1	2
14	DF	(Greece) Stelios Manolas	1	0	0	1
14	FW	(Greece) Thomas Stafylas	0	0	1	1
Own goals			1	0	0	1
Totals			63	14	7	84

=== Hat-tricks ===
Numbers in superscript represent the goals that the player scored.

Player	Against	Result	Date	Competition	Source
(Greece) Thomas Mavros	(Socialist Federal Republic of Yugoslavia) Velež Mostar	3–1 (H)	5 March 1981	Balkans Cup	

=== Clean sheets ===
As of 14 June 1981
The list is sorted by competition order when total clean sheets are equal and then alphabetically by surname. Clean sheets in games where both goalkeepers participated are awarded to the goalkeeper who started the game. Goalkeepers with no appearances are not included.

Rank	Player	Alpha Ethniki	Greek Cup	Balkans Cup	Total
1	(Greece) Spyros Ikonomopoulos	8	2	0	10
2	(Greece) Lakis Stergioudas	1	1	0	1
3	(Greece) Nikos Christidis	1	0	0	1
Totals		10	3	0	13

=== Disciplinary record ===
As of 14 June 1981

N	P	Nat.	Name	Alpha Ethniki			Greek Cup			Balkans Cup			Total			Notes
N	P	Nat.	Name	Yellow card	Second yellow card	Red card	Yellow card	Second yellow card	Red card	Yellow card	Second yellow card	Red card	Yellow card	Second yellow card	Red card	Notes
Goalkeepers
—	GK	(Greece)	Nikos Christidis													
—	GK	(Greece)	Lakis Stergioudas													
—	GK	(Greece)	Spyros Ikonomopoulos													
—	GK	(Greece)	Dimitris Alafogiannis													
Defenders
—	DF	(Greece)	Lakis Nikolaou	1			2						3			
—	DF	(Greece)	Giannis Mousouris	1			1						2			
—	DF	(Greece)	Giorgos Rigas	2									2			
—	DF	(Greece)	Michalis Tzirakis	1			2						3			
—	DF	(Greece)	Giorgos Kalogeropoulos	3									3			
—	DF	(Greece)	Petros Ravousis	4									4			
—	DF	(Greece)	Vangelis Paraprastanitis	4						1			5			
—	DF	(Greece)	Stelios Manolas	5	1								5	1		
—	DF	(Greece)	Lysandros Georgamlis													
Midfielders
—	MF	(Greece)	Kostas Eleftherakis	1						1			2			
—	MF	(Socialist Federal Republic of Yugoslavia)	Franjo Vladić	2					1				2		1	
—	MF	(Greece)	Petros Karavitis													
—	MF	(Greece)	Christos Ardizoglou	4			2	1					6	1		
—	MF	(Greece)	Spyros Thodis	4									4			
—	MF	(Greece)	Vangelis Vlachos	2			2						4			
Forwards
—	FW	(Greece)	Dimitrios Gesios				1						1			
—	FW	(Socialist Federal Republic of Yugoslavia)	Dušan Bajević	1					1				1		1	
—	FW	(Greece)	Dimitrios Papadopoulos													
—	FW	(Greece)	Thomas Mavros	1		1							1		1	
—	FW	(Greece)	Manolis Kottis													
—	FW	(Greece)	Thomas Stafylas													
Left during Winter Transfer Window
—	DF	(Greece)	Dimitris Argyros													
—	FW	(Cyprus)	Tasos Konstantinou													
—	FW	(Greece)	Giorgos Chatziioannidis													

=== Starting 11 ===
This section presents the most frequently used formation along with the players with the most starts across all competitions.

N.	Formation	Matchday(s)
44	4–3–3	1–21, 23–34
2	4–4–2	22

Nat.	Player	Pos.
(Greece)	Spyros Ikonomopoulos	GK
(Greece)	Michalis Tzirakis	RCB
(Greece)	Petros Ravousis (C)	LCB
(Greece)	Stelios Manolas	RB
(Greece)	Vangelis Paraprastanitis	LB
(Greece)	Spyros Thodis	DM
(Greece)	Christos Ardizoglou	RCM
(Greece)	Vangelis Vlachos	LCM
(Greece)	Dimitrios Gesios	RW
(Greece)	Thomas Mavros	LW
(Socialist Federal Republic of Yugoslavia)	Dušan Bajević	CF

Last updated: 1981-06-14
