= 1983–84 AEK Athens F.C. season =

AEK Athens
1983–84 season
- Chairman: Lefteris Panagidis (until 9 January); Andreas Zafiropoulos
- Manager: John Barnwell (until 30 November); Helmut Senekowitsch (until 13 February); Kostas Nestoridis
- Stadium: AEK Stadium
- Alpha Ethniki: 7th
- Greek Cup: Round of 16
- European Cup Winners' Cup: First round
- Top goalscorer: League: Thomas Mavros (13); All: Thomas Mavros (17)
- Highest home attendance: 28,564 vs Olympiacos (26 February 1984)
- Lowest home attendance: 4,462 vs Apollon Athens (12 February 1984)
- Average home league attendance: 14,245
- Biggest win: AEK Athens 5–1 Ethnikos Piraeus; AEK Athens 4–0 PAOK
- Biggest defeat: Újpest 4–1 AEK Athens; Ethnikos Piraeus 3–0 AEK Athens
Home colours	Away colours	Third colours

The 1983–84 season was the 60th season in the existence of AEK Athens F.C. and the 25th consecutive season in the top flight of Greek football. They competed in the Alpha Ethniki, the Greek Cup and the European Cup Winners' Cup. The season began on 4 September 1983 and finished on 6 May 1984.

== Kits ==
Supplier: Zita Hellas
Sponsor(s): Nissan

Home	Away	Third

== Overview ==
In the summer of 1983, AEK underwent another change in their presidency. Michalis Arkadis stepped down as president and despite having won the last season's Cup, he did not have the financial means to meet the club's obligations and most notably the renewall of the contract of Thomas Mavros. The Cypriot businessman, Lefteris Panagidis stepped in and kept Mavros at the club by giving him the amount of 45 million drachmas and replaced Arkadis as president. Even thought the new president, owned a travel agency in Athens, he was based in England. As a result, his admiration for the English football model was reflected in his decisions. Thus, appointed the British John Barnwell, as the new manager who had previously worked at Wolves and won the League Cup. The British footballers, Trevor Ross from Everton and Tommy Langley from Crystal Palace, came with him to the team in an atmosphere of excitement and high expectations. AEK also proceeded with the acquisition of the Greek-Brazilian Pavlos Papaioannou from Rodos, as well as the promising midfielder of Veria, Babis Akrivopoulos. On the other hand, Mojaš Radonjić left the team and returned to Yugoslavia, after failing to live up to the expectations.

The team began with excitement, but were quickly brought back to reality and had one of the worst seasons in their history. The club started badly and presenting poor form in the away matches. Barnwell was eventually dismissed after a home defeat by Iraklis in the 12th matchday, having also been eliminated from the Cup Winners' Cup at the first round by Újpest, having recorded four defeats, two draws and no away victories. The Englishman was succeeded the last season's manager, Helmut Senekowitsch at first and later by Kostas Nestoridis, who completed the disappointing league campaign. In the meantime Zafiropoulos returned as the club's president, replacing Panagidis. Eventually AEK finished in seventh place, 16 points behind Panathinaikos, who won the title.

In the Cup, AEK after passing though Diagoras, Anagennisi Giannitsa and Apollon Athens, were eliminated in the round of 16 by the eventual finalists, AEL.

The few highlights of the season were the 4–0 victory over PAOK, the performance of Thomas Mavros with 13 goals in 21 appearances and the emergence of Vangelis Vlachos, who showed he could become one of the club's key players.

== Management team ==
Position	Staff
Manager	(Greece) Kostas Nestoridis
Assistant manager	(Greece) Stelios Skevofilakas
Goalkeeping coach	(Greece) Stelios Serafidis
Head of Medical	(Greece) Lakis Nikolaou

== Players ==
=== Squad information ===
NOTE: The players are the ones that have been announced by the AEK Athens' press release. No edits should be made unless a player arrival or exit is announced. Updated 6 May 1984, 23:59 UTC+3.

Player	Nat.	Position(s)	Date of birth (Age)	Signed	Previous club	Transfer fee	Contract until
Goalkeepers
Lakis Stergioudas	(Greece)	GK	11 December 1952 (aged 31)	1972	(Greece) Niki Polygyros	₯36,000	1985
Christos Arvanitis	(Greece)	GK	23 January 1953 (aged 31)	1982	(Greece) Olympiacos	₯7,000,000	1986
Spyros Ikonomopoulos	(Greece)	GK	25 July 1959 (aged 24)	1979	(Greece) AEK Athens U20	—	1989
Defenders
Petros Ravousis (Captain)	(Greece)	CB / RB	1 October 1954 (aged 29)	1972	(Greece) Aetos Skydra	Free	1985
Vangelis Paraprastanitis	(Greece)	LB / CB / DM	10 February 1955 (aged 29)	1979	(Greece) Trikala	₯4,000,000	1984
Stavros Letsas	(Greece)	RB / RM / CB	6 March 1957 (aged 27)	1979	(Greece) Agioi Anargyroi	Free	1986
Panagiotis Stylianopoulos	(Greece)	RB / LB / RM / DM	4 September 1957 (aged 26)	1978	(Greece) AEK Athens U20	—	1986
Pavlos Papaioannou	(Greece) (Brazil)	RB / LB / DM / RM	19 May 1959 (aged 25)	1983	(Greece) Rodos	₯10,000,000	1988
Takis Karagiozopoulos	(Greece)	CB / DM / ST	4 February 1961 (aged 23)	1981	(Greece) Veria	₯8,000,000	1986
Stelios Manolas	(Greece)	CB / RB	13 July 1961 (aged 22)	1980	(Greece) AEK Athens U20	—	1984
Lysandros Georgamlis	(Greece)	RB / CB / DM / LB	25 February 1962 (aged 22)	1980	(Greece) AEK Athens U20	—	1985
Midfielders
Christos Ardizoglou (Vice-captain)	(Greece) (Israel)	RM / LM / RW / LW / AM / RB / LB	25 March 1953 (aged 31)	1974	(Greece) Apollon Athens	₯12,000,000	1986
Spyros Thodis	(Greece)	CM / AM / DM	23 July 1955 (aged 28)	1979	(Greece) Anagennisi Karditsa	₯4,000,000	1984
Dinos Ballis	(Greece)	AM / CM / DM / SS / ST / CB	25 May 1957 (aged 27)	1981	(Greece) Aris	₯17,000,000	1986
George Christopoulos	(Australia) (Greece)	CM	11 December 1960 (aged 23)	1983	(Australia) Canberra City	₯1,000,000	1984
Babis Akrivopoulos	(Greece)	AM / RM / LM / SS / ST	4 September 1961 (aged 22)	1983	(Greece) Veria	₯8,400,000	1988
Vangelis Vlachos (Vice-captain 2)	(Greece)	AM / CM / RM / LM	6 January 1962 (aged 22)	1979	(Greece) AEK Athens U20	—	1989
Forwards
Thomas Mavros	(Greece)	ST / LW	31 May 1954 (aged 30)	1976	(Greece) Panionios	₯10,000,000	1987
Manolis Kottis	(Greece)	ST / LW / RW	25 January 1955 (aged 29)	1980	(Greece) Rodos	₯7,500,000	1985
Giannis Dintsikos	(Greece)	ST / SS / RW / LW / AM	25 June 1960 (aged 24)	1981	(Greece) Kastoria	₯20,000,000	1986
Giorgos Chatziioannidis	(Greece)	ST	1 June 1961 (aged 23)	1979	(Greece) AEK Athens U20	—	1984
Left during Winter Transfer Window
Michalis Tzirakis	(Greece)	CB / RB / RM	6 March 1954 (aged 30)	1980	(Greece) OFI	₯8,000,000	1985
Takis Nikoloudis	(Greece)	CM / AM / RM / LM	26 August 1951 (aged 32)	1982	(Greece) Olympiacos	₯4,000,000	1984
Angel Kolev	(Bulgaria)	AM / RM / LM	22 August 1953 (aged 30)	1982	(Bulgaria) Lokomotiv Sofia	Free	1984
Trevor Ross	(Scotland)	CM / AM / DM / RM / LM	16 January 1957 (aged 27)	1983	(England) Everton	₯8,000,000	1985
Tommy Langley	(England)	ST	8 February 1958 (aged 26)	1983	(England) Crystal Palace	₯15,000,000	1985
Christos Tatidis	(Greece)	LW	8 May 1962 (aged 22)	1982	(Greece) AEK Athens U20	—	1987

== Transfers ==
=== In ===
==== Summer ====
Pos.	Player	From	Fee	Date	Contract Until	Source
DF	(Greece) Pavlos Papaioannou	(Greece) Rodos	₯10,000,000^{[a]}	13 July 1983	30 June 1988	
MF	(Greece) Takis Nikoloudis	(Canada) Inter-Montréal	Loan termination	11 July 1983	30 June 1984	
MF	(Scotland) Trevor Ross	(England) Everton	₯8,000,000	30 June 1983	30 June 1985	
MF	(Greece) Babis Akrivopoulos	(Greece) Veria	₯8,400,000	15 July 1983	30 June 1988	
FW	(England) Tommy Langley	(England) Crystal Palace	₯15,000,000	14 July 1983	30 June 1985	

Notes

a. Plus a conduction of a friendly match between the two clubs.

=== Out ===
==== Summer ====
Pos.	Player	To	Fee	Date	Source
MF	(Greece) Giorgos Vlantis	(Greece) Acharnaikos	Free transfer	27 July 1983	
FW	(Greece) Panagiotis Angelidis	(Greece) Acharnaikos	Free transfer	28 July 1983	
FW	(Socialist Federal Republic of Yugoslavia) Mojaš Radonjić	(Socialist Federal Republic of Yugoslavia) Sutjeska Nikšić	Contract termination	13 July 1983	

==== Winter ====
Pos.	Player	To	Fee	Date	Source
DF	(Greece) Michalis Tzirakis	(Greece) OFI	Contract termination	12 December 1983	
MF	(Greece) Takis Nikoloudis	(Greece) Apollon Kalamarias	₯1,000,000	9 December 1983	
MF	(Scotland) Trevor Ross	(England) Sheffield United	Contract termnation	14 December 1983	
MF	(Bulgaria) Angel Kolev	(Bulgaria) Shumen	Contract termination	17 November 1983	
FW	(England) Tommy Langley	(England) Coventry City	Contract termnation	24 February 1984	
FW	(Greece) Christos Tatidis	(Greece) Panserraikos	Contract termination	14 December 1983	

=== Loan in ===
==== Winter ====
Pos.	Player	From	Fee	Date	Until	Option to buy	Source
MF	(Australia) George Christopoulos	(Australia) Canberra City	₯1,000,000	13 December 1983	12 December 1984	✓	

=== Loan out ===
==== Summer ====
Pos.	Player	To	Fee	Date	Until	Option to buy	Source
GK	(Greece) Fanis Kofinas	(Greece) Korinthos	Free	28 July 1983	30 June 1985	✗	

=== Contract renewals ===
Pos.	Player	Date	Former Exp. Date	New Exp. Date	Source
GK	(Greece) Spyros Ikonomopoulos	8 June 1984	30 June 1984	30 June 1989	
MF	(Greece) Vangelis Vlachos	8 June 1984	30 June 1984	30 June 1989	

=== Overall transfer activity ===
==== Expenditure ====
Summer: ▼ ₯41,400,000

Winter: ▼ ₯0

Total: ▼ ₯41,400,000

==== Income ====
Summer: ▲ ₯0

Winter: ▲ ₯2,000,000

Total: ▲ ₯2,000,000

==== Net Totals ====
Summer: ▼ ₯41,400,000

Winter: ▲ ₯2,000,000

Total: ▼ ₯39,400,000

== Pre-season and friendlies ==
3 August 1983 Friendly	TSV Ofterdingen	3–2	AEK Athens	Stuttgart
19:30 EEST (UTC+3)	Dürr 15' (pen.); Weibliger 52'; Majstolović 54'	Report	Dintsikos 29'; Ardizoglou 53'; Letsas (yellow card) 85'	Stadium: Ceuderg Stadium; Attendance: 1,500; Referee: Merz (West Germany)

4 August 1983 Friendly	Hensksfelt	0–8	AEK Athens	Stuttgart
19:30 EEST (UTC+3)		Report	Chatziioannidis 2', 26', 47', 67'; Kottis 31', 55', 79', 83'	Attendance: 1,000; Referee: Grenrich (West Germany)

6 August 1983 Friendly	Northeim XI	1–10	AEK Athens	Stuttgart
20:00 EEST (UTC+3)	Müller 15'	Report	Ross 5'; Mavros 32', 35' (pen.), 48', 57', 58', 61'; Langley (yellow card) 46', (goal) 76', 86'; Nikoloudis 53'	Attendance: 2,000; Referee: Pechna (West Germany)

7 August 1983 Friendly	VfL Herrenberg	3–5	AEK Athens	Stuttgart
19:30 EEST (UTC+3)	Plitz 3'; Georgamlis 33' (o.g.); Bros II 37'	Report	Akrivopoulos 32'; Chatziioannidis 38'; Kottis 47', 75'; Ross 87'	Attendance: 1,100; Referee: Emart (West Germany)

10 August 1983 Friendly	FC Esslingen	0–15	AEK Athens	Stuttgart
19:30 EEST (UTC+3)		Report	Langley 9', 37', 39'; Mavros 11', 13', 71'; Weiss 21' (o.g.); Vlachos 25', 57', 65', 68'; Ross 52'; Paraprastanitis 69'; Dintsikos 71'; Kottis 81'	Attendance: 1,000; Referee: Sweikart (West Germany)

17 August 1983 Friendly	AEK Athens	0–0	Newcastle United	Nea Filadelfeia
21:00 EEST (UTC+3)		Report		Stadium: AEK Stadium; Attendance: 15,469; Referee: Makis Germanakos (Athens)

22 August 1983 Friendly	AEK Athens	2–0	QPR	Nea Filadelfeia
21:00 EEST (UTC+3)	Vlachos 1'; Dintsikos 25'	Report		Stadium: AEK Stadium; Attendance: 11,221; Referee: Pantelis Argyriou (Dodecanese)

24 August 1983 Friendly	AEK Athens	1–1	Austria Wien	Nea Filadelfeia
21:00 EEST (UTC+3)	Dintsikos 53' (pen.)	Report	Papaioannou 66' (o.g.)	Stadium: AEK Stadium; Attendance: 12,786; Referee: Christos Kolokythas (Athens)
Note: The report of the match states that the goal of Austria was an own goal by Tzirakis, but it was later corrected.

29 August 1983 Friendly	AEK Athens	3–1	Aris	Nea Filadelfeia
21:00 EEST (UTC+3)	Kottis 4'; Dintsikos 40'; Arvanitis (yellow card) 42'; Ballis 83'	Report	Kouis 43'	Stadium: AEK Stadium; Attendance: 11,000; Referee: Kostas Adamopoulos (Athens)

26 October 1983 Friendly	AEK Athens	4–0	Panionios	Nea Filadelfeia
15:30 EEST (UTC+3)	Langley 69', 81'; Kottis 77'; Tatidis 82'	Report		Stadium: AEK Stadium; Attendance: 1,500; Referee: Nikos Pantazis

2 November 1983 Friendly	Panelefsiniakos	0–3	AEK Athens	Elefsina
15:00 EET (UTC+2)		Report	Manolas 28'; Stylianopoulos 47', 62'	Stadium: Municipal Stadium of Elefsina; Referee: Stelios Mavridis

9 November 1983 Friendly	Chalkida	2–1	AEK Athens	Chalcis
15:00 EET (UTC+2)	Merditsis 6'; Mystriotis 26'	Report	Mavros 32' (pen.)	Stadium: Municipal Stadium of Chalkida; Referee: Prionas
Note: AEK were playing with 10 players from the 51st minute, due to an injury of Mavros.

13 November 1983 Friendly	AEK Athens	2–2	Velež Mostar	Nea Filadelfeia
15:30 EET (UTC+2)	Dintsikos 40'; Langley 50'	Report	Skočajić 22'; Đusečić 56'	Stadium: AEK Stadium; Attendance: 1,219; Referee: Panagiotis Anastasopoulos (Athens)

23 November 1983 Friendly	AEK Athens	2–0	Panelefsiniakos	Nea Filadelfeia
15:00 EET (UTC+2)	Chatziioannidis 38'; Langley 79'	Report		Stadium: AEK Stadium; Referee: Chatzifoutis

28 December 1983 Acropolis Tournament	AEK Athens	2–3	Hamburger SV	Marousi
16:00 EET (UTC+2)	Dintsikos 19'; Kottis 84'	Report	Hansen 14', 65'; Wuttke 75'	Stadium: Olympic Stadium; Attendance: 45,000; Referee: Kostas Dimitriadis (Piraeus)

8 May 1984 Friendly	AEK Athens	7–1	Agioi Anargyroi	Nea Filadelfeia
17:30 EEST (UTC+3)	Letsas 15'; Thodis (penalty missed) 45'; Dintsikos 55', 78'; Kottis 65', 71', 76'; Paraprastanitis 86'	Report	Bitharas 22'	Stadium: AEK Stadium

13 May 1984 Friendly	AEK Athens	4–0	Apollon Athens	Nea Filadelfeia
18:00 EEST (UTC+3)	Vlachos 17', 67'; Kottis 40'; Manolas 48'	Report		Stadium: AEK Stadium; Attendance: 1,000; Referee: Giannis Batras (Karditsa)

18 May 1984 Friendly	AEK Athens	5–3	Keratsini	Nea Filadelfeia
18:00 EEST (UTC+3)	Dintsikos 40'; Vlachos 65', 85'; Stylianopoulos 81'; Karagiozopoulos 89'	Report	Gaitanos 9'; Poulos 49' (pen.); Venetsianos 71'	Stadium: AEK Stadium

== Competitions ==
=== Overall record ===
Competition	First match	Last match	Starting round	Final position	Record							
Competition	First match	Last match	Starting round	Final position	Pld	W	D	L	GF	GA	GD	Win %
Alpha Ethniki	4 September 1983	6 May 1984	Matchday 1	7th	30	12	6	12	40	31	+9	40.00
Greek Cup	21 December 1983	4 April 1984	First round	Round of 16	6	3	2	1	6	2	+4	50.00
European Cup Winners' Cup	14 September 1983	28 September 1983	First round	First round	2	1	0	1	3	4	−1	50.00
Total					38	16	8	14	49	37	+12	42.11

Last updated: 6 May 1984
Source: Competitions

=== Alpha Ethniki ===
==== League table ====
Pos	Team	Pld	W	D	L	GF	GA	GD	Pts	Qualification or relegation
5	PAOK	30	11	13	6	33	29	+4	35	
6	AEL	30	13	6	11	28	29	−1	32	Qualification for Cup Winners' Cup first round (Note: Since Panathinaikos, winners of 1983–84 Greek Football Cup, was qualified for the 1984–85 European Cup, losing cup finalists AEL earned a spot in the first round of the 1984–85 European Cup Winners' Cup.)
7	AEK Athens	30	12	6	12	40	31	+9	30	
8	OFI	30	11	5	14	31	39	−8	27	
9	Ethnikos Piraeus	30	9	8	13	38	43	−5	26	

Source: RSSSF
Rules for classification: 1st points; 2nd decision match; 3rd head-to-head goal difference.

==== Results summary ====
Overall								Home						Away					
Pld	W	D	L	GF	GA	GD	Pts	W	D	L	GF	GA	GD	W	D	L	GF	GA	GD
30	12	6	12	40	31	+9	30	10	3	2	32	13	+19	2	3	10	8	18	−10

Source: Competitive matches

==== Results by Matchday ====
Round	1	2	3	4	5	6	7	8	9	10	11	12	13	14	15	16	17	18	19	20	21	22	23	24	25	26	27	28	29	30
Ground	H	A	H	A	A	H	A	H	A	H	A	H	H	A	H	A	H	A	H	H	A	H	A	H	A	H	A	A	H	A
Result	W	L	W	L	D	W	L	W	L	W	D	L	L	W	D	L	W	L	D	D	L	W	W	W	L	W	L	D	W	L
Position	3	9	4	6	7	5	6	6	7	6	6	7	11	7	9	9	8	9	8	7	9	7	7	6	6	6	7	7	6	7

Source: Competitive matches
A = Away; H = Home; W = Win; D = Draw; L = Loss; P = Postponed

==== Matches ====
4 September 1983 1	AEK Athens	2–0	PAS Giannina	Nea Filadelfeia
17:30 EEST (UTC+3)	Mavros 46'; Manolas (yellow card) 48'; Dintsikos 66'			Stadium: AEK Stadium; Attendance: 20,157; Referee: Tasos Kantartzis (Thessaloniki)

11 September 1983 2	PAOK	1–0	AEK Athens	Serres
17:30 EEST (UTC+3)	Kostikos 30'		Manolas (yellow card) 65'; Vlachos (yellow card) 89'	Stadium: Serres Municipal Stadium; Attendance: 11,886; Referee: Giannis Triantafyllou (Dodecanese)
Note: The match took place at Serres due to PAOK's stadium ban for incidents in the 1983 Greek Cup final against AEK.

23 December 1984 3	AEK Athens	5–1	Ethnikos Piraeus	Nea Filadelfeia
14:45 EET (UTC+2)	Ardizoglou 34'; Kottis 44'; Georgamlis 55'; Mavros 74', 90' (pen.)		Batsinilas 18'	Stadium: AEK Stadium; Attendance: 14,359; Referee: Theoklis Kontzalis (Thessaloniki)

25 September 1983 4	Apollon Kalamarias	1–0	AEK Athens	Thessaloniki
16:00 EEST (UTC+3)	Vlachos (yellow card) 25'; Manolas 60' (o.g.); Ross (yellow card) 70'		Chatzieleftheriou (yellow card); Savvakis (yellow card) 65'; Tompoulidis (yellow card) 70'	Stadium: Aris Stadium; Attendance: 8,608; Referee: Vasiliou (Piraeus)

2 October 1983 5	Apollon Athens	1–1	AEK Athens	Rizoupoli
16:00 EEST (UTC+3)	Vrettos (yellow card) 19'; Van de Kerkhof (yellow card) 44'; Chatzis (yellow card) 48'; Pissas 64'		Vlachos (yellow card); Arvanitis (yellow card) 6'; Mavros (red card) 32'; Karagiozopoulos (yellow card) 35', (goal) 53' (pen.); Ardizoglou (penalty missed) 78'	Stadium: Rizoupoli Stadium; Attendance: 7,818; Referee: Panagiotis Koutris (Thessaloniki)

9 October 1983 6	AEK Athens	4–1	Panionios	Nea Filadelfeia
16:00 EEST (UTC+3)	Akrivopoulos 17'; Karagiozopoulos 47' (pen.); Dintsikos 71'; Kottis 86'		Koutropoulos (yellow card); Lima (yellow card); Saravakos 55'	Stadium: AEK Stadium; Attendance: 16,442; Referee: Kostas Adamopoulos (Athens)

16 October 1983 7	Olympiacos	1–0	AEK Athens	Piraeus
15:30 EEST (UTC+3)	Gounaris (yellow card); Anastopoulos 78'		Karagiozopoulos (yellow card); Vlachos (yellow card)	Stadium: Karaiskakis Stadium; Attendance: 34,023; Referee: Vasilis Tikmoglou (Thessaloniki)

23 October 1983 8	AEK Athens	2–0	Aris	Nea Filadelfeia
15:30 EEST (UTC+3)	Nikoloudis 8'; Vlachos 79'			Stadium: AEK Stadium; Attendance: 14,969; Referee: Dimitris Koutoulas (Serres)

30 October 1983 9	OFI	1–0	AEK Athens	Heraklion
15:00 EET (UTC+2)	Vlastos 30'; Ziakos (yellow card) 54'		Chatziioannidis (yellow card) 57'	Stadium: Ergotelis Stadium; Attendance: 8,330; Referee: Stefanos Tsirikidis (Thessaloniki)

6 November 1983 10	AEK Athens	3–0	Egaleo	Nea Filadelfeia
15:00 EET (UTC+2)	Kottis 15', 80'; Vlachos 53'		St. Papatheodorou (yellow card) 54'	Stadium: AEK Stadium; Attendance: 9,299; Referee: Kostas Adamopoulos (Athens)

20 November 1983 11	Doxa Drama	0–0	AEK Athens	Drama
15:00 EET (UTC+2)				Stadium: Doxa Drama Stadium; Attendance: 5,177; Referee: Vasilis Tikmoglou (Thessaloniki)

27 November 1983 12	AEK Athens	1–3	Iraklis	Nea Filadelfeia
15:00 EET (UTC+2)	Nikoloudis (yellow card); Vlachos 57'		Karaiskos (yellow card); Georgiev (yellow card); Hatzipanagis 16' (pen.); Papadopoulos 71'; Papaioannou 83'	Stadium: AEK Stadium; Attendance: 22,189; Referee: Vangelis Giannakoudakis (Piraeus)
Note: At the 75th minute, Akrivopoulos was seriously injured and couldn't continue and AEK had already used the maximum of 2 substitutions, thus they finished the game with 10 men.

11 December 1983 13	AEK Athens	0–2	Panathinaikos	Nea Filadelfeia
15:00 EET (UTC+2)	Papaioannou (yellow card); Kottis (yellow card)		Tarasis (yellow card); Vonortas 67'; Antoniou 68'	Stadium: AEK Stadium; Attendance: 26,634; Referee: Nikos Fakis (Athens)

18 December 1983 14	Panserraikos	0–2	AEK Athens	Serres
15:00 EET (UTC+2)	Georgiadis (yellow card) 59'; Aivazidis (yellow card) 80'; Keramidas (red card) 82'		Dintsikos 5', 87'; Ballis (yellow card) 38'	Stadium: Serres Municipal Stadium; Attendance: 4,802; Referee: Kosmas Loukidis (Imathia)

8 January 1984 15	AEK Athens	1–1	AEL	Nea Filadelfeia
15:00 EET (UTC+2)	Vlachos 36'; Manolas (yellow card) 76'		Voutiritsas 72'	Stadium: AEK Stadium; Attendance: 14,853; Referee: Moschos (Piraeus)

15 January 1984 16	PAS Giannina	1–0	AEK Athens	Ioannina
15:00 EET (UTC+2)	Charalampidis 54' (pen.)			Stadium: Zosimades Stadium; Attendance: 4,434; Referee: Lampros Michailidis (Piraeus)

22 January 1984 17	AEK Athens	4–0	PAOK	Nea Filadelfeia
15:00 EET (UTC+2)	Ballis (yellow card) 18'; Mavros 25' (pen.); Dintsikos 27'; Manolas 41', (yellow card) 48'; Ardizoglou 65'			Stadium: AEK Stadium; Attendance: 14,517; Referee: Kostas Dimitriadis (Piraeus)

29 January 1984 18	Ethnikos Piraeus	3–0	AEK Athens	Piraeus
15:30 EET (UTC+2)	Liolios 30'; Ilunga 35'; Pittas 68'		Dintsikos (yellow card) 90'	Stadium: Karaiskakis Stadium; Attendance: 19,840; Referee: Vangelis Markou (Larissa)

5 February 1984 19	AEK Athens	3–3	Apollon Kalamarias	Nea Filadelfeia
15:30 EET (UTC+2)	Vlachos 15'; Mavros 36', 75'; Karagiozopoulos (yellow card) 40'		Skočajić 9', (yellow card) 56'; Guerino (yellow card) 39'; Koutas (red card) 39'; Nikoloudis 59'; Savvakis 85'	Stadium: AEK Stadium; Attendance: 4,763; Referee: Giannis Georgiadis (Drama)

12 February 1984 20	AEK Athens	1–1	Apollon Athens	Nea Filadelfeia
15:30 EET (UTC+2)	Vlachos 35'		Pantelidis 14'; Svoronos (yellow card) 32'	Stadium: AEK Stadium; Attendance: 4,462; Referee: Petros Kalpakidis (Thessaloniki)

19 February 1984 21	Panionios	1–0	AEK Athens	Nea Smyrni
15:30 EET (UTC+2)	Aposporis (yellow card); Georgiadis 67' (pen.)		Karagiozopoulos (yellow card); Dintsikos (yellow card); Stylianopoulos (yellow card)	Stadium: Nea Smyrni Stadium; Attendance: 11,460; Referee: Giorgos Kifonidis (Kavala)

26 February 1984 22	AEK Athens	2–1	Olympiacos	Nea Filadelfeia
16:00 EET (UTC+2)	Karagiozopoulos (yellow card); Ardizoglou (yellow card); Manolas (yellow card); Georgamlis (yellow card); Mavros 78', 86' (pen.)		Vamvakoulas (yellow card); Anastopoulos 62' (pen.)	Stadium: AEK Stadium; Attendance: 28,564; Referee: Antonis Vassaras (Thessaloniki)

4 March 1984 23	Aris	1–2	AEK Athens	Thessaloniki
16:00 EET (UTC+2)	Zindros 23' (pen.); Tzifopoulos (yellow card) 30'		Skouboe 5' (o.g.); Mavros 15'; Karagiozopoulos (yellow card) 22'; Letsas (yellow card) 28'; Dintsikos (yellow card) 32'; Stylianopoulos (yellow card) 46'	Stadium: Aris Stadium; Attendance: 8,790; Referee: Kostas Lappas (Karditsa)

11 March 1984 24	AEK Athens	2–0	OFI	Nea Filadelfeia
16:00 EET (UTC+2)	Kottis 14'; Mavros 15'; Vlachos (yellow card) 81'		Vlastos (yellow card) 44'	Stadium: AEK Stadium; Attendance: 9,360; Referee: Panagiotis Koutris (Thessaloniki)

18 March 1984 25	Egaleo	3–2	AEK Athens	Aigaleo
16:00 EET (UTC+2)	St. Papatheodorou (yellow card) 15'; Simeoforidis 39', 78'; Outsikas (yellow card) 51'; Arabatzis 69'; G. Papatheodorou (yellow card) 80'		Dintsikos (yellow card) 15'; Mavros 17', 43'; Georgamlis (yellow card) 20'	Stadium: Aigaleo Municipal Stadium; Attendance: 8,993; Referee: Theoklis Kontzalis (Thessaloniki)

1 April 1984 26	AEK Athens	1–0	Doxa Drama	Nea Filadelfeia
17:30 EEST (UTC+3)	Vlachos 67'			Stadium: AEK Stadium; Attendance: 5,788; Referee: Kostas Dimitriadis (Piraeus)

8 April 1984 27	Iraklis	2–1	AEK Athens	Thessaloniki
17:30 EEST (UTC+3)	Mitošević 2'; Adamou 41'; Xanthopoulos (yellow card) 67'		Mavros 25'; Georgamlis (yellow card) 44'; Paraprastanitis (red card) 67'	Stadium: Kaftanzoglio Stadium; Attendance: 13,365; Referee: Lampros Michailidis (Piraeus)

15 April 1984 28	Panathinaikos	0–0	AEK Athens	Ampelokipoi
17:30 EEST (UTC+3)	Kapsis (yellow card); Charalampidis (penalty missed) 68'		Stylianopoulos (yellow card)	Stadium: Leoforos Alexandras Stadium; Attendance: 24,399; Referee: Rigas Angelakis (Macedonia)

29 April 1984 29	AEK Athens	1–0	Panserraikos	Nea Filadelfeia
17:30 EEST (UTC+3)	Karagiozopoulos 50' (pen.)			Stadium: AEK Stadium; Attendance: 5,526; Referee: Tasos Kantartzis (Thessaloniki)

6 May 1984 30	AEL	2–0	AEK Athens	Larissa
17:30 EEST (UTC+3)	Valaoras 1'; Kmiecik 71'			Stadium: Alcazar Stadium; Attendance: 7,697; Referee: Vasileiou (Piraeus)
Note: At the 70th minute, Stylianopoulos was seriously injured and couldn't continue and AEK had already used the maximum of 2 substitutions, thus they finished the game with 10 men.

=== Greek Cup ===
==== Matches ====
21 December 1983 First round	Diagoras	0–0 (a.e.t.) (4–5 p)	AEK Athens	Rhodes
14:15 EET (UTC+2)	Chatzopoulos (yellow card); Papadios (yellow card)		Ardizoglou (yellow card); Papaioannou (yellow card)	Stadium: Diagoras Stadium; Attendance: 3,704; Referee: Stefanos Tsirikidis (Thessaloniki)
	Penalties
	Chatzopoulos (penalty scored); Tsoukleidis (penalty scored); Tompoulidis (penalty scored); Ftaklas (penalty scored); Rados (penalty missed)		(penalty scored) Karagiozopoulos; (penalty scored) Vlachos; (penalty scored) Ravousis; (penalty scored) Georgamlis; (penalty scored) Dintsikos

4 January 1984 Additional round	Anagennisi Giannitsa	0–2	AEK Athens	Giannitsa
14:15 EET (UTC+2)			Langley 12'; Georgamlis (yellow card) 57'; Mavros 71' (pen.)	Stadium: Giannitsa Municipal Stadium; Attendance: 5,271; Referee: Kostas Lappas (Karditsa)

===== Round of 32 =====
25 January 1984 First leg	Apollon Athens	0–1	AEK Athens	Rizoupoli
15:00 EET (UTC+2)			Mavros 11'	Stadium: Rizoupoli Stadium; Referee: Kostas Adamopoulos (Athens)

22 February 1984 Second leg	AEK Athens	2–0 (3–0 agg.)	Apollon Athens	Nea Filadelfeia
15:00 EET (UTC+2)	Mavros 33'; Vlachos 62'		Pantelidis (yellow card) 20'	Stadium: AEK Stadium; Attendance: 4,846; Referee: Stefanos Tsirikidis (Thessaloniki)

===== Round of 16 =====
21 March 1984 First leg	AEK Athens	0–1	AEL	Nea Filadelfeia
16:00 EET (UTC+2)	Manolas (yellow card) 1'; Dintsikos (yellow card) 36'		Valaoras (yellow card) 7'; Ziogas 32'; Kyrilidis (yellow card) 44'; Parafestas (yellow card) 52'	Stadium: AEK Stadium; Attendance: 8,701; Referee: Michalis Matsoukas (Euboea)

4 April 1984 Second leg	AEL	1–1 (2–1 agg.)	AEK Athens	Larissa
16:30 EEST (UTC+3)	Plitsis (yellow card) 41'; Andreoudis 62'	Report	Mavros 41'; Karagiozopoulos (yellow card) 70'	Stadium: Alcazar Stadium; Attendance: 15,637; Referee: Kosmas Loukidis (Imathia)

=== European Cup Winners' Cup ===
==== First round ====
14 September 1983 First leg	AEK Athens (Greece)	2–0	(Hungary) Újpest	Athens, Greece
17:30 EEST (UTC+3)	Kottis 65'; Ross 88'	Report		Stadium: AEK Stadium; Attendance: 16,776; Referee: Keith Hackett (England)

28 September 1983 Second leg	Újpest (Hungary)	4–1 (4–3 agg.)	(Greece) AEK Athens	Budapest, Hungary
	Kisznyér 10'; Kiss 13'; Kardos 39' (pen.), 74' (pen.)	Report	Ross (yellow card) 8'; Georgamlis (yellow card) 9'; Vlachos 17'; Ballis (yellow card) 24'; Arvanitis (yellow card) 38'; Dintsikos (yellow card) 65'	Stadium: Megyeri úti Stadion; Attendance: 3,213; Referee: Dieter Pauly (West Germany)

== Statistics ==
=== Squad statistics ===
As of 6 May 1984

No.	Pos	Player	Alpha Ethniki		Greek Cup		European Cup Winners' Cup		Total	
No.	Pos	Player	Apps	Goals	Apps	Goals	Apps	Goals	Apps	Goals
Goalkeepers
—	GK	(Greece) Lakis Stergioudas	8	0	3	0	0	0	11	0
—	GK	(Greece) Christos Arvanitis	22	0	3	0	2	0	27	0
—	GK	(Greece) Spyros Ikonomopoulos	0	0	0	0	0	0	0	0
Defenders
—	DF	(Greece) Petros Ravousis	16	0	2	0	1	0	19	0
—	DF	(Greece) Vangelis Paraprastanitis	16	0	6	0	1	0	23	0
—	DF	(Greece) Stavros Letsas	6	0	1	0	0	0	7	0
—	DF	(Greece) Panagiotis Stylianopoulos	17	0	4	0	0	0	21	0
—	DF	(Greece) Pavlos Papaioannou	21	0	4	0	2	0	27	0
—	DF	(Greece) Takis Karagiozopoulos	27	3	6	0	2	0	35	3
—	DF	(Greece) Stelios Manolas	27	1	5	0	2	0	34	1
—	DF	(Greece) Lysandros Georgamlis	26	1	6	0	1	0	33	1
Midfielders
—	MF	(Greece) Christos Ardizoglou	24	2	4	0	2	0	30	2
—	MF	(Greece) Spyros Thodis	1	0	0	0	0	0	1	0
—	MF	(Greece) Dinos Ballis	25	0	6	0	2	0	33	0
—	MF	(Australia) George Christopoulos	12	0	2	0	0	0	14	0
—	MF	(Greece) Babis Akrivopoulos	11	1	0	0	2	0	13	1
—	MF	(Greece) Vangelis Vlachos	29	7	6	1	2	1	37	9
Forwards
—	FW	(Greece) Thomas Mavros	21	13	6	4	2	0	29	17
—	FW	(Greece) Manolis Kottis	25	5	3	0	1	1	29	6
—	FW	(Greece) Giannis Dintsikos	25	5	6	0	2	0	33	5
—	FW	(Greece) Giorgos Chatziioannidis	8	0	2	0	0	0	10	0
Left during Winter Transfer Window
—	DF	(Greece) Michalis Tzirakis	0	0	0	0	0	0	0	0
—	MF	(Greece) Takis Nikoloudis	7	1	0	0	0	0	7	1
—	MF	(People's Republic of Bulgaria) Angel Kolev	0	0	0	0	0	0	0	0
—	MF	(Scotland) Trevor Ross	5	0	0	0	2	1	7	1
—	FW	(England) Tommy Langley	5	0	3	1	0	0	8	1
—	FW	(Greece) Christos Tatidis	1	0	0	0	0	0	1	0

=== Goalscorers ===
As of 6 May 1984
The list is sorted by competition order when total goals are equal, then by position and then alphabetically by surname.

Rank	Pos.	Player	Alpha Ethniki	Greek Cup	European Cup Winners' Cup	Total
1	FW	(Greece) Thomas Mavros	13	4	0	17
2	MF	(Greece) Vangelis Vlachos	7	1	1	9
3	FW	(Greece) Manolis Kottis	5	0	1	6
4	FW	(Greece) Giannis Dintsikos	5	0	0	5
5	DF	(Greece) Takis Karagiozopoulos	3	0	0	3
6	MF	(Greece) Christos Ardizoglou	2	0	0	2
7	DF	(Greece) Stelios Manolas	1	0	0	1
7	DF	(Greece) Lysandros Georgamlis	1	0	0	1
7	MF	(Greece) Takis Nikoloudis	1	0	0	1
7	MF	(Greece) Babis Akrivopoulos	1	0	0	1
7	FW	(England) Tommy Langley	0	1	0	1
7	MF	(Scotland) Trevor Ross	0	0	1	1
Own goals			1	0	0	1
Totals			40	6	3	49

=== Clean sheets ===
As of 6 May 1984
The list is sorted by competition order when total clean sheets are equal and then alphabetically by surname. Clean sheets in games where both goalkeepers participated are awarded to the goalkeeper who started the game. Goalkeepers with no appearances are not included.

Rank	Player	Alpha Ethniki	Greek Cup	European Cup Winners' Cup	Total
1	(Greece) Christos Arvanitis	7	1	1	9
2	(Greece) Lakis Stergioudas	3	3	0	6
Totals		10	4	1	15

=== Disciplinary record ===
As of 6 May 1984

N	P	Nat.	Name	Alpha Ethniki			Greek Cup			European Cup Winners' Cup			Total			Notes
N	P	Nat.	Name	Yellow card	Second yellow card	Red card	Yellow card	Second yellow card	Red card	Yellow card	Second yellow card	Red card	Yellow card	Second yellow card	Red card	Notes
Goalkeepers
—	GK	(Greece)	Lakis Stergioudas													
—	GK	(Greece)	Christos Arvanitis	1						1			2			
—	GK	(Greece)	Spyros Ikonomopoulos													
Defenders
—	DF	(Greece)	Petros Ravousis													
—	DF	(Greece)	Vangelis Paraprastanitis			1									1	
—	DF	(Greece)	Stavros Letsas	1									1			
—	DF	(Greece)	Panagiotis Stylianopoulos	3									3			
—	DF	(Greece)	Pavlos Papaioannou	1			1						2			
—	DF	(Greece)	Takis Karagiozopoulos	6			1						7			
—	DF	(Greece)	Stelios Manolas	5			1						6			
—	DF	(Greece)	Lysandros Georgamlis	3			1			1			5			
Midfielders
—	MF	(Greece)	Christos Ardizoglou	1			1						2			
—	MF	(Greece)	Spyros Thodis													
—	MF	(Greece)	Dinos Ballis	2						1			3			
—	MF	(Australia)	George Christopoulos													
—	MF	(Greece)	Babis Akrivopoulos													
—	MF	(Greece)	Vangelis Vlachos	5									5			
Forwards
—	FW	(Greece)	Thomas Mavros			1									1	
—	FW	(Greece)	Manolis Kottis	1									1			
—	FW	(Greece)	Giannis Dintsikos	4			1			1			6			
—	FW	(Greece)	Giorgos Chatziioannidis	1									1			
Left during Winter Transfer Window
—	DF	(Greece)	Michalis Tzirakis													
—	MF	(Greece)	Takis Nikoloudis	1									1			
—	MF	(People's Republic of Bulgaria)	Angel Kolev													
—	MF	(Scotland)	Trevor Ross	1						1			2			
—	FW	(England)	Tommy Langley													
—	FW	(Greece)	Christos Tatidis													

=== Starting 11 ===
This section presents the most frequently used formation along with the players with the most starts across all competitions.

N.	Formation	Matchday(s)
24	4–3–3	13–30
14	4–4–2	1–12

Nat.	Player	Pos.
(Greece)	Christos Arvanitis	GK
(Greece)	Stelios Manolas	RCB
(Greece)	Takis Karagiozopoulos	LCB
(Greece)	Lysandros Georgamlis	RB
(Greece)	Vangelis Paraprastanitis	LB
(Greece)	Dinos Ballis	DM
(Greece)	Christos Ardizoglou (C)	RCM
(Greece)	Vangelis Vlachos	LCM
(Greece)	Manolis Kottis	RW
(Greece)	Giannis Dintsikos	LW
(Greece)	Thomas Mavros	CF

Last updated: 1984-05-06
