= Enver Marić =

Bosnian footballer and manager

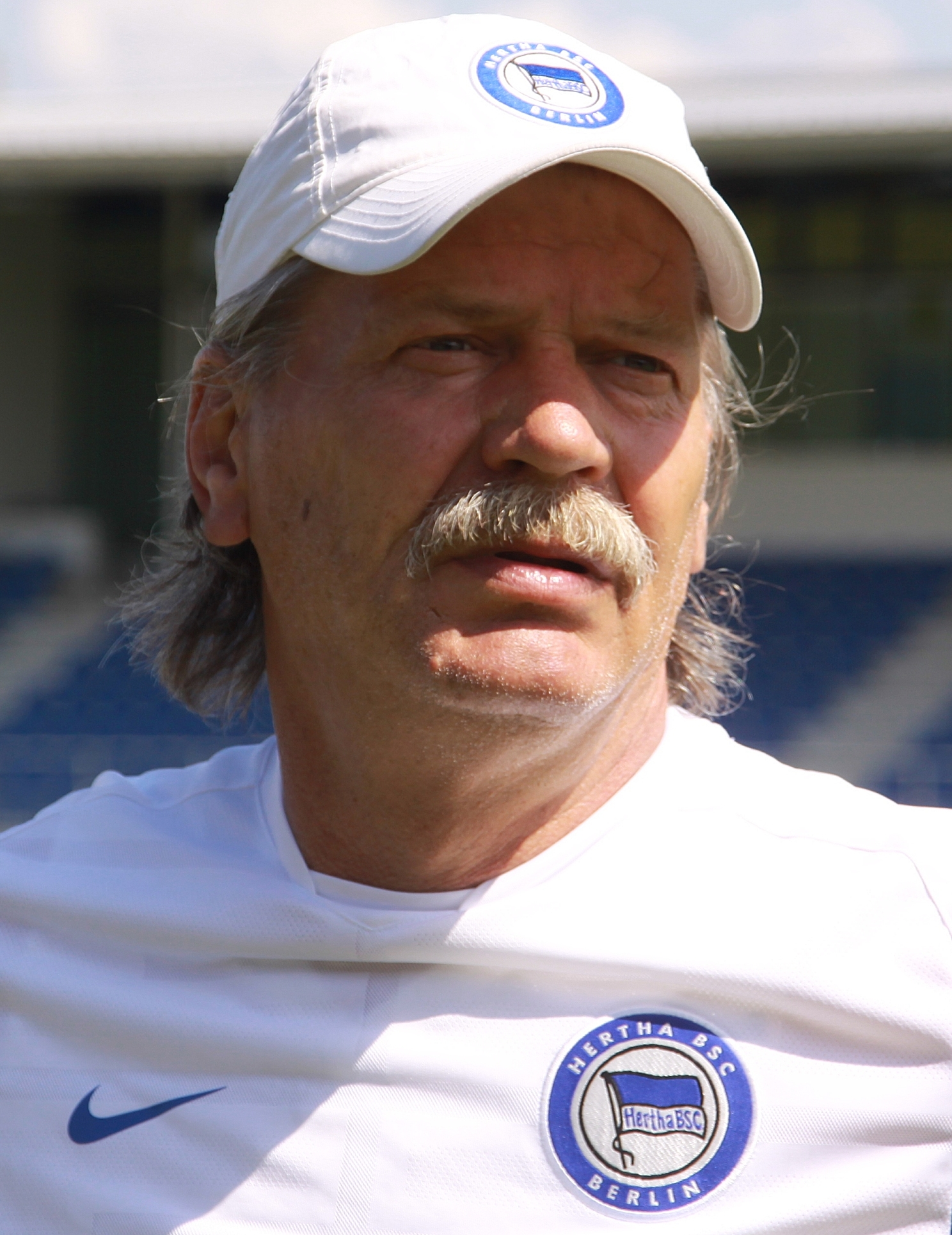
- Marić as goalkeeping coach of Hertha BSC in 2009

Personal information
- Date of birth: 16 April 1948 (age 78)
- Place of birth: Mostar, PR Bosnia and Herzegovina, FPR Yugoslavia
- Height: 1.82 m (6 ft 0 in)
- Position: Goalkeeper

Youth career
- –1967: Velež Mostar

Senior career*
Years	Team	Apps	(Gls)
1967–1976	Velež Mostar	213	(0)
1976–1978	Schalke 04	47	(0)
1978–1985	Velež Mostar	226	(1)
Total		486	(1)

International career
1972–1976	Yugoslavia	32	(0)

Managerial career
- 1990: Velež Mostar
- 1993–1998: Fortuna Düsseldorf (goalkeeping coach)
- 1998: Fortuna Düsseldorf (caretaker)
- 1998–2010: Hertha BSC (goalkeeping coach)
- 1999: Bosnia and Herzegovina (goalkeeping coach)
- * Club domestic league appearances and goals

Enver Marić (born 16 April 1948) is a Bosnian former professional football goalkeeper and retired football manager. He is widely considered to be one of the greatest goalkeepers from the former Yugoslavia of all time.

== Club career ==
Marić started his career playing for hometown club Velež Mostar from 1967 to 1976, for who he played a record 600 games in his nine-year stint. Marić then went on to play for German club Schalke 04 from 1976 to 1978. He returned to Velež in 1978, ending his career at the club in 1985.

Marić is also remembered for being the part of the Velež three known as the "Mostar BMV" (Bajević, Marić and Vladić) during the 1960s, 1970s and 1980s.

== International career ==
Marić made his debut for the Yugoslavia national team in an April 1972 European Championship qualification match against the Soviet Union and has earned a total of 32 caps, scoring no goals. His final international was a May 1976 European Championship qualification match away against Wales. He appeared in the 1974 FIFA World Cup for Yugoslavia.

== Managerial career ==
Marić returned to football as a manager, briefly managing Velež in 1990, then working as a goalkeeping coach at Fortuna Düsseldorf from 1993 to 1998 and Hertha BSC from 1998 to 2010. For a short stint in 1998, Marić was the caretaker manager of Düsseldorf. During 1999, he worked as a goalkeeping coach in the Bosnia and Herzegovina national team.

== Personal life ==
On 7 October 2010, Marić suffered a stroke in his home in Berlin, Germany.

== Honours ==
=== Player ===
Velež Mostar

- Yugoslav Cup: 1980–81
- Balkans Cup: 1980–81

Individual

- Yugoslav Footballer of the Year: 1973
