= 1980–81 Balkans Cup =

Tournament details
- Country: Balkans
- Teams: 6

Final positions
- Champions: (Socialist Federal Republic of Yugoslavia) Velež Mostar
- Runners-up: (Bulgaria) Trakia Plovdiv

Tournament statistics
- Matches played: 10
- Goals scored: 49 (4.9 per match)

The 1980–81 Balkans Cup was an edition of the Balkans Cup, a football competition for representative clubs from the Balkan states. It was contested by 6 teams and Velež Mostar won the trophy.

== Group Stage ==
=== Group A ===
Pos	Team	Pld	W	D	L	GF	GA	GR	Pts	Qualification	VEL	AEK	FLA
1	(Socialist Federal Republic of Yugoslavia) Velež Mostar	4	2	0	2	8	6	1.333	4	Advance to Final	—	2–0	4–1
2	(Greece) AEK Athens	4	2	0	2	7	7	1.000	4		3–1	—	3–2
3	(Albania) Flamurtari	4	2	0	2	7	9	0.778	4		2–1	2–1	—

Source: rsssf.com
Rules for classification: 1) points; 2) goal average; 3) number of goals scored
18 September 1980

Velež Mostar (Socialist Federal Republic of Yugoslavia)	2–0	(Greece) AEK Athens
Skočajić 49'; Matijević 89'	Report

Bijeli Brijeg, Mostar
Attendance: 13,000
Referee: Stjepan Glavina (Yugoslavia)

8 October 1980

AEK Athens (Greece)	3–2	(Albania) Flamurtari
Stafylas 75'; Kottis 77'; Rigas 78'	Report	Çurri 14'; Kovaçi 36'

AEK Stadium, Athens
Attendance: 2,885
Referee: Cumhur Demir (Turkey)

23 October 1980

Flamurtari (Albania)	2–1	(Socialist Federal Republic of Yugoslavia) Velež Mostar
Çurri 43'; Lleshi 55'		Goal

Flamurtari Stadium, Vlorë

5 March 1981

AEK Athens (Greece)	3–1	(Socialist Federal Republic of Yugoslavia) Velež Mostar
Mavros 53', 58', 65'	Report	Međedović 25'

AEK Stadium, Athens
Referee: Georgescu (Romania)

19 March 1981

Flamurtari (Albania)	2–1	(Greece) AEK Athens
Çurri 21'; Kovaçi 50'	Report	Eleftherakis 86'

Flamurtari Stadium, Vlorë
Attendance: 18,000
Referee: Ivan Yosifov (Bulgaria)

9 April 1981

Velež Mostar (Socialist Federal Republic of Yugoslavia)	4–1	(Albania) Flamurtari
?		Kovaçi 79'

Bijeli Brijeg, Mostar

=== Group B ===
Pos	Team	Pld	W	D	L	GF	GA	GR	Pts	Qualification	TRK	SSB	ZON
1	(Bulgaria) Trakia Plovdiv	2	1	0	1	5	3	1.667	2	Advance to Final	—	3–0	—
2	(Romania) Sportul Studențesc	2	1	0	1	3	5	0.600	2		3–2	—	—
3	(Turkey) Zonguldak Kömürspor (Note: Zonguldak Kömürspor withdrew from the tournament.)	0	0	0	0	0	0	—	0		—	—	—

Source: rsssf.com
Rules for classification: 1) points; 2) goal average; 3) number of goals scored
Notes:
23 October 1980

Sportul Studențesc (Romania)	3–2	(Bulgaria) Trakia Plovdiv
Goal		Manolov; Slavkov

Stadionul Regie, Bucharest

12 August 1981

Trakia Plovdiv (Bulgaria)	3–0 Awarded^{1}	(Romania) Sportul Studențesc

Trakia Stadium, Plovdiv

== Final ==
Summary
Team 1	Agg.	Team 2	1st leg	2nd leg
Trakia Plovdiv (Bulgaria)	7–12	(Socialist Federal Republic of Yugoslavia) Velež Mostar	5–6	2–6

=== First leg ===
25 November 1981

Trakia Plovdiv (Bulgaria)	5–6	(Socialist Federal Republic of Yugoslavia) Velež Mostar
Kostadinov 3', 55' (pen.), 59' (pen.); Slavkov 42'; Bakalov 83'	Report	Bijedić 17'; Bajević 32', 75'; Međedović 40'; Karabeg 46'; Bingulac 77'

Trakia, Plovdiv
Attendance: 12,000
Referee: Antonios Vassaras (Greece)

=== Second leg ===
2 December 1981

Velež Mostar (Socialist Federal Republic of Yugoslavia)	6–2	(Bulgaria) Trakia Plovdiv
Bingulac 2', 46', 79'; Horozov 10' (o.g.); Bajević 17', 24'		Agrirov 47'; Yurukov 53'

Bijeli Brijeg, Mostar
Attendance: 1,000
Referee: Jucan (Romania)

Velež Mostar won 12–7 on aggregate.
