= Përparim Kovaçi =

Albanian footballer and coach (born 1956)

Personal information
- Full name: Përparim Kovaçi
- Date of birth: 8 January 1956 (age 70)
- Place of birth: Berat, Albania
- Height: 1.68 m (5 ft 6 in)
- Position: Striker

Youth career
- –1972: Tomori Berat

Senior career*
Years	Team	Apps	(Gls)
1972–1990	Tomori		(100)
1981	→ Flamurtari (loan)	0	(0)

Managerial career
- 2011–2012: Tomori (assistant)
- 2012: Tomori
- * Club domestic league appearances and goals

Përparim Kovaçi (born 8 January 1956 in Berat) is a former Albanian football player and coach who spent nearly all of his career at Tomori Berat, where he is the club's top goalscorer with over 100 league goals scored.

== Club career ==
He was the Kategoria Superiore's top goalscorer in the 1979/80 season with 18 goals. He was loaned to Flamurtari for their 1980–81 Balkans Cup games against Velež Mostar and AEK Athens, scoring in both games against Velež.

== International career ==
A fast striker, then national coach Loro Boriçi deemed him too small in build for the national team and preferred the likes of Albanian legends Arbën Minga and Agustin Kola.
