= Zoran Babović =

Serbian footballer

Personal information
- Date of birth: 1 March 1954 (age 72)
- Height: 1.82 m (6 ft 0 in)
- Position: Forward

Senior career*
Years	Team	Apps	(Gls)
1978–1980	Galenika Zemun		
1980–1983	Kastoria		
1984–1985	Pierikos		

Managerial career
- 1995: Trikala
- 1995–1997: Trikala
- 1997–1998: Larissa
- 1998–1999: Panetolikos
- 1999: Kallithea
- 1999–2000: Ethnikos Piraeus
- 2000: Trikala
- 2001: Lamia
- 2010: Trikala
- 2013: Trikala 1963
- 2018–2019: Anagennisi Karditsa
- 2019–: OF Ierapetra (director)
- * Club domestic league appearances and goals

Zoran Babović (born 1 March 1954) is a Serbian retired football player manager. A forward, Babović had spells in Greece with Kastoria and Pierikos Katerini.
