= Spyros Thodis =

Greek footballer

Personal information
- Full name: Spyridon Thodis
- Date of birth: 23 July 1955 (age 71)
- Place of birth: Karditsa, Greece
- Height: 1.77 m (5 ft 10 in)
- Position: Midfielder

Youth career
- 1970–1971: Anagennisi Karditsa

Senior career*
Years	Team	Apps	(Gls)
1971–1979	Anagennisi Karditsa		
1979–1984	AEK Athens	86	(7)
1984–1985	Anagennisi Karditsa		
- * Club domestic league appearances and goals

Spyros Thodis (Greek: Σπύρος Θώδης; born 23 July 1955) is a Greek former professional footballer who played as midfielder.

== Club career ==
Thodis started playing at Anagennisi Karditsa in 1971 at the age of 16 in the second division. He played in the position of central midfielder, responding to the demands of the position despite his young age, as he possessed a remarkable technical training that allowed him to organize the team's game and with his infallible passes to direct its development. His eight-year presence in the second division with Anagennisi Karditsa, put him in the sights of major clubs in the summer of 1979. AEK Athens, who was one of them, was primarily interested in the midfielder of Pierikos, Lakis Papaioannou. However, some issues broke down the negotiations of the agents of both sides, which resulted in the transfer of Papaioannou to Iraklis. Thus, on 7 August 1979 they acquired Thodis as an alternative for a fee of 4 million drachmas.

His style of play and the display of leadership skills on the field caused the admiration of the fans and led the collective press of the era, to add a letter to the player's last name and changing it to "Theodis" (Greek: "Θεώδης") (paraphrase of his first name to resemble the Greek word for God). The expectations of fans, journalists and more of Thodis himself were not verified to the extent required by the value of the footballer, as his occasional coexistence in the team with other midfielders such as Franjo Vladić, Hristo Bonev and Kostas Eleftherakis, in a strange way, led the coaches of the "yellow-blacks" to assign him in more defensive duties of the midfield area than offensive. Wanting to always remain consistent in the duties assigned to him, he tried to cover the position of the defensive midfielder, without creating problems to the team, despite the fact that he stayed away from his natural area of play. With AEK, he won the Greek Cup in 1983, but without having an active participation as that season he had only 1 participation in its matches, a consequence of the injuries to the leg but mainly to the waist which troubled him a lot during his career. On 4 August 1984, he returned to Anagennisi Karditsa in order to end his career as a footballer. However, he continued his career, competing for smaller amateur clubs until 1999.

== After football ==
Thodis is professionally active in the area of his birthplace, Karditsa, enacting with catering businesses and cafeterias.

== Honours ==
AEK Athens

- Greek Cup: 1982–83
