= Giorgos Rigas =

Greek footballer

Personal information
- Full name: Georgios Rigas
- Date of birth: 6 December 1953 (age 72)
- Place of birth: Mavrothalassa, Serres, Greece
- Height: 1.79 m (5 ft 10 in)
- Positions: Defender; defensive midfielder

Youth career
- 1969–1970: Aris Mavrothalassa
- 1970–1971: Kavala

Senior career*
Years	Team	Apps	(Gls)
1971–1980	Kavala	226^{[a]}	(7^{[a]})
1980–1982	AEK Athens	27	(1)
1982–1984	Makedonikos	28^{[a]}	(1^{[a]})
Total		281	(9)
- * Club domestic league appearances and goals

Giorgos Rigas (Greek: Γιώργος Ρήγας; born 6 December 1953) is a Greek former professional footballer who played as a defender.

== Club career ==
Rigas began his football career at the club of his village Aris Mavrothalassa in 1969. There, he was scouted by people of Kavala and in 1970, he joined their youth team. A year later, he was promoted to the men's team. He mainly played as a sweeper, but he was also used as a right-back or as a defensive midfielder, depending on the needs of the manager and was distinguished for his fighting spirit and dynamism in his game. He spent 8 seasons at the club, winning a second division championship in 1976.

In the summer of 1980, Rigas did not agree with the club's management in his stay, despite wanting it for professional reasons and thus he was released. Thus, on 2 July he signed for AEK Athens, after the recommendation by their manager, Miltos Papapostolou. Despite establishing himself within the team, he lost a couple of matches, due to his punished with a one-month suspension for an indecent gesture towards the fans of Aris in a championship match at Thessaloniki. The following season didn't have the same playing time, which resulted in his release on 29 July 1982.

In the summer of 1982, Rigas joined the newly promoted Makedonikos, where he became a key figure of the club. However, in the relegation play-off against Panionios he was sent off again due to indecent gestures towards the opponent fans. Eventually, Makedonikos were relegated and Rigas continued with the team until August 1984, when he was released following a disagreement over finances and retired from football.

== After football ==
After finishing his football career, Rigas became involved in car sales.

On 19 April 1986, his name was allegedly involved in the bribery case of AEK Athens towards footballers of Panserraikos. On that night, which was eve of the match Panserraikos–AEK, the general manager of AEK, Giannis Chrysovitsianos, was arrested on the accusation of using Rigas to bribe Michalis Galatidis, Giorgos Sfakianakis and Giannis Antoniadis to underperform in the match. The case was transferred to the courts and became known as the "Chrysovitsianos case". As a result, the court sentenced Rigas and Chrysovitsianos to one year in prison and a fine of 100,000 drachmas, while AEK were deducted 3 points from the next season's championship. Both Rigas and Chrysovitsianos convicted, their sentence was commuted to a fine of 400 drachmas per day, appealed and were released.

== Honours ==
Kavala

- Beta Ethniki: 1975–76 (North Group)

== Notes ==
a. Does not include second division stats.
