= Dimitrios Papadopoulos (footballer, born 1950) =

Greek footballer (1950–2020)

Personal information
- Full name: Dimitrios Papadopoulos
- Date of birth: 1 March 1950
- Place of birth: Heraklion, Crete, Greece
- Date of death: 31 January 2020 (aged 69)
- Place of death: Heraklion, Crete, Greece
- Height: 1.75 m (5 ft 9 in)
- Position: Forward

Youth career
- 1960–1964: Ergotelis

Senior career*
Years	Team	Apps	(Gls)
1964–1967	Ergotelis		
1967–1980	OFI		(49)
1980–1981	AEK Athens	9	(0)
1981–1983	Irodotos		(30)

International career^{‡}
1977	Greece	1	(0)
- * Club domestic league appearances and goals as of 30 May 1983 ‡ National team caps and goals as of 26 October 1977

Dimitrios Papadopoulos (Greek: Δημήτριος Παπαδόπουλος; 1 March 1950 – 31 January 2020) was a Greek professional footballer who played as a forward.

== Club career ==
At the age of 10, Papadopoulos joined the infrastructure departments of Ergotelis and after 4 years he joined the first team of the club that was then competing in the second division. Left-footed, with a tremendous sense of goal, he soon emerged as the team's top striker. In 1967 he was transferred to OFI together with 5 other teammates from Ergotelis. These transfers were made in an almost "coup d'état" way, obeying the will of the dictatorial regime to create a strong and competitive team on the island. With the presence of Papadopoulos, OFI was promoted to the first division for the first time in 1968. The team was then relegated to the second division and in the 1976 season, it was again promoted to the first division with Papadopoulos as the top scorer with 23 goals. In the first season in the first division he emerged as the second scorer with 20 goals, 2 behind Thanasis Intzoglou.

On 14 July 1980, Loukas Barlos, taking advantage of the fact that Papadopoulos was released from OFI, brought him to AEK Athens as his personal choice. Papadopoulos immediately agreed seeing on the AEK jersey the representation of Refugee Hellenism honoring his Asia Minor parents and their expulsion from their ancestral land in 1922. Claiming a place in the then attack of AEK with Mavros, Bajević was equivalent to a feat and so the already 31-year-old Papadopoulos was satisfied with just 9 appearances with the "yellow-black" shirt without managing to score a goal. In 1981 season he asked to be released and return to Crete. Returning to Crete, he faced the cold attitude of the managers of the region who remained bitter about his move to AEK. Thus, signed for Irodotos, the team of the refugee Nea Alikarnassos with whom he played for two seasons in the second national team, scoring 30 goals. In 1983 he retired as a footballer and engaged in coaching.

== International career ==
In 1977 Papadopoulos was called by Alketas Panagoulias to play for Greece. He played in a match against Bulgaria in Thessaloniki for the Balkan Cup and this was his first and last participation with the national team.

== Managerial career ==
He was a coach at Ergotelis and later worked with the academies of both OFI and Ergotelis until 2006 when he created his own football academies in Heraklion.

== Personal life ==
Papadopoulos while still a footballer he worked at OTE and his wife's work at the "Olympic" of Heraklion, where they lived with their two children. Papadopoulos was struck by the terminal illness and although he underwent head surgery in October 2019, he was died on 31 January 2020, at the hospital where he was being treated.

== Honours ==
OFI

- Beta Ethniki: 1975–76 (South Group)

Individual

- Beta Ethniki top scorer: 1975–76 (South Group)
