= Thomas Stafylas =

Greek footballer (born 1958)

Personal information
- Full name: Thomas Stafylas
- Date of birth: 4 April 1958
- Place of birth: Greece
- Positions: Forward; wide midfielder

Youth career
- 1974–1979: AEK Athens

Senior career*
Years	Team	Apps	(Gls)
1977–1981	AEK Athens	12	(0)
1979–1980	→ Acharnaikos (loan)	29	(10)
1981–1987	Acharnaikos	171	(42)
1987–1990	Kerkyra		

International career
1979	Greece amateur		
- * Club domestic league appearances and goals

Thomas Stafylas (Greek: Θωμάς Σταφυλάς; born 4 April 1958) is a Greek former professional footballer who played as forward.

== Club career ==
Stafylas started football from a young age joining the academies of AEK Athens, due to his father, who was a supporter of the club. He quickly showed good elements competing in the offense of the youth departments of the yellow-blacks. On 26 December 1977, he made his debut with the men's team, against Ethnikos Piraeus at home, in a match where the professional footballers went on a strike which resulted in the clubs competing with amateur footballers. At the end of that season AEK won the domestic double. On 16 August 1979 he was loaned to the second division side Acharnaikos. Stafylas had a good overall performance in the second division, scoring 10 goals and in the summer of 1980 he returned to AEK. In the yellow-blacks he didn't get many opportunities to play, even though he was considered conscientious and consistent as a professional despite his young age. On 11 December 1981, he terminated his contract so that the newly-signed Mojaš Radonjić could be included in the list of the team's professional footballers and joined Acharnaikos.

He played in the second division with the club of Acharnes, becoming one of their top players. Apart from the offense, Stafylas also competed as a midfielder and was distinguished for his speed, his good movements, his disciplined play and his technical training. However, his relations with the management around were tense and eventually in 1987 he was transferred to the third division side, Kerkyra, where he played until 1990. Later in his career Stafylas competed in the amateur championship, having a stint with Argyroupoli and Nea Smyrni, while he also worked as a manager.

== International career ==
Stafylas played with Greece amateur in 1979.

== Honours ==
AEK Athens

- Alpha Ethniki: 1977–78
- Greek Cup: 1977–78
