= Vangelis Paraprastanitis =

Greek footballer

Personal information
- Full name: Evangelos Paraprastanitis
- Date of birth: 10 February 1955 (age 71)
- Place of birth: Mouzaki, Karditsa, Greece
- Height: 1.74 m (5 ft 9 in)
- Positions: Defender; defensive midfielder

Youth career
- 1967–1973: Proodos Mouzaki

Senior career*
Years	Team	Apps	(Gls)
1973–1980	Trikala		
1980–1984	AEK Athens	103	(5)
1984–1992	Egaleo		

International career
1980	Greece	1	(0)

Managerial career
- 1997–1998: Trikala
- 2003: Trikala
- * Club domestic league appearances and goals

Vangelis Paraprastanitis (Greek: Βαγγέλης Παραπραστανίτης; born 10 February 1955) is a Greek former professional footballer, who played as a defender. His nickname was "Johnny", due to his similar appearance with decathlete Johnny Weissmuller.

== Club career ==
Paraprastanitis began football at the age of 13 when in 1968 he joined the team of his village, Proodos Mouzaki under the technical guidance of the coach Mandelou. His fame quickly spread beyond the borders of Mouzaki and in 1973 he was transferred to Trikala. There, coached by Nikos Pangalos, he unfolded the aspects of his talent, as a result of which was called upon to cover almost all positions of the pitch, always distinguishing himself either as an attacker, a defender or as a midfielder. His appearances aroused the interest of the great clubs of Athens and Thessaloniki. In 1997 Olympiacos expressed their interest in signing him, at the point where they conducted two friendlies against Trikala exclusively to watch him. The transfer broke down at the last moment for unknown reasons and at the following season it was the turn of Panathinaikos to try to sign him, but the transfer was again not completed. PAOK and Aris followed in 1979 without succeeding in adding him to their team. The disappointment of Paraprastanitis was such that he even thought of immigrating to Canada in search of better financial rewards and an improvement in the conditions in his life. His desire to play in a big club was made a reality, when the then superintendent of AEK Athens, Thanasis Tsitos, convinced the club's management about the value of the footballer. On 22 December 1979 Paraprastanitis eventually signed for AEK for the amount of 4 million drachmas in order to provide solutions in the team's defense, with the deal becoming effective from July 1980. Until he officially joined the yellow-blacks, he competed only in friendly matches.

At AEK he was then established as a left-back by the manager, Miltos Papapostolou. He certainly did not impress since the administrative upheavals, due to the fact that he was a choice of the former administration of Loukas Barlos and was soon brought him out of favor on the part of the new owner, Andreas Zafiropoulos. With AEK he won the Greek Cup in 1983. On 17 December 1984, he was transferred to Egaleo, for a fee of 500,000 drachmas. At the club of Aigaleo he had a long career as a center-back, following them in all the divisions they competed until 1992, when he stopped playing football at the age of 38.

== International career ==
Paraprasanitis played one game for Greece against Australia in a 3–3 draw, on 11 November 1980.

== After football ==
Along with football, Paraprasanitis also served in the Fire Brigade. From 1997 he worked in various positions in the technical leadership of Trikala.

== Personal life ==
Paraprastanitis is married to Vasiliki Papaefthimiou and they have one daughter named Olga. On 22 February 2022 through his daughter he donated his football shoes to the New Museum of AEK Athens.

== Honours ==
AEK Athens

- Greek Cup: 1982–83
