= Vladimir Skočajić =

Bosnian footballer (1954–2024)

Personal information
- Date of birth: 14 October 1954
- Place of birth: Mostar, PR Bosnia and Herzegovina, FPR Yugoslavia
- Date of death: 11 December 2024 (aged 70)
- Position: Winger

Senior career*
Years	Team	Apps	(Gls)
- Lokomotiva Zagreb
- Velež Mostar
- Igman Konjic
- Stolac
1977–1979	Čapljina		
1979–1983	Velež Mostar	153	(48)
1983–1985	Apollon Kalamarias	28	(4)
1985–1987	Velež Mostar		

Managerial career
- 2000: Zrinjski Mostar
- Branitelj
- * Club domestic league appearances and goals

Vladimir Skočajić (14 October 1954 – 11 December 2024) was a Bosnian football player and manager. A winger, he played for FK Velež from Mostar, where he scored 48 goals in 153 matches. Skočajić died on 11 December 2024, at the age of 70.

== Club career ==
Skočajić started his career in FK Velež Mostar. He is known for scoring four goals against Dinamo Zagreb on 9 February 1980 in a game that ended 9–2. He is one of the two Velež players, the other being Vladimir Matijević, who won the Yugoslav Cup twice, in 1981 and 1986. Nicknamed Taramba, he moved to Greece to play for Apollon Kalamarias.

His career ended due to a serious car accident; his recovery took four months.
