= Michalis Tzirakis =

Greek footballer

Personal information
- Full name: Michail Tzirakis
- Date of birth: 6 March 1954 (age 72)
- Place of birth: Heraklion, Greece
- Height: 1.80 m (5 ft 11 in)
- Positions: Defender; right midfielder

Youth career
- 1968–1971: OFI

Senior career*
Years	Team	Apps	(Gls)
1971–1980	OFI		
1980–1983	AEK Athens	51	(0)
1983–1985	OFI	7	(0)
- * Club domestic league appearances and goals

Michalis Tzirakis (Greek: Μιχάλης Τζιράκης; born 6 March 1954) is a Greek former professional footballer who played as defender.

== Club career ==
Tzirakis took his first football steps in 1968 he joined OFI youth team and in 1971 he became a professional, playing in the outside right position with success. When OFI was promoted to the first division, he played with the first team and from then on he became irreplaceable. However arrival at OFI of the manager Les Shannon also marked a change for Tzirakis since he established himself in the position of sweeper where his performance rose a lot and his game was distinguished by dynamism and self-sacrifice. His good performances attracted the interest of PAOK, who in 1979 made an offer to OFI, which the latter rejected. In the summer of 1980 it was the turn of AEK Athens to express their interest for the player. However, Tzirakis was loved by the people of OFI, who pushed for him to remain in the Cretan team, while their management tried to find a solution. In the board of directors, the president of OFI proposed to give 8 million drachmas to Tzirakis and not to give him to any other club for five years. His proposal was voted down and by 8 votes to 6 against, it was decided to sell Tzirakis to AEK. The president of OFI, Doulofakis raised the issue his of resignation and an administrative crisis broke out. Thus, the persistence of AEK and their owner Loukas Barlos as well as the will of the footballer overcame the obstacles that existed and Tzirakis was transferred to AEK at a total cost of 17 million drachmas, an amount that reached 20% of the club's share capital and even so for a defender. AEK gave 8 million drachmas to OFI and 5.5 million drachmas to the footballer while also paying 3.5 million drachmas to the tax office.

At the yellow-blacks, Tzirakis was called upon to cover the gap of Lakis Nikolaou in the defensive line and partner up with Petros Ravousis. At the beginning of the season and in the big games he was infallible, while showing a frivolity against theoretically weak opponents. However, the first impressions of the presence were quite positive. With AEK he won the Greek Cup in 1983 in a 2–0 win against PAOK, where he came in as a sub, at the 65th minute.

On 12 December 1983, he was released from AEK and returned to OFI. There he played a few league games until the summer of 1985, when he retired at the age of 31.

== Honours ==
OFI

- Beta Etniki: 1975–76

AEK Athens

- Greek Cup: 1982–83
