= Franjo Vladić =

Bosnian footballer (1950–2024)

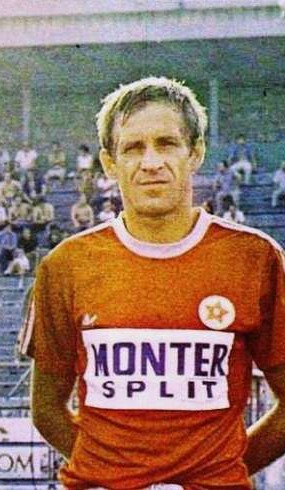
- Vladić with Velež Mostar in 1971

Personal information
- Date of birth: 19 October 1950
- Place of birth: Mostar, PR Bosnia and Herzegovina, FPR Yugoslavia
- Date of death: 18 June 2024 (aged 73)
- Place of death: Mostar, Bosnia and Herzegovina
- Position: Midfielder

Youth career
- Velež Mostar

Senior career*
Years	Team	Apps	(Gls)
1968–1979	Velež Mostar	280	(70)
1979–1981	AEK Athens	21	(2)
1980	→ Panachaiki (loan)	8	(0)
1981–1985	Velež Mostar	81	(11)
Total		390	(83)

International career
1972–1977	Yugoslavia	26	(3)

Managerial career
- 1995–1996: Zrinjski Mostar
- * Club domestic league appearances and goals

Franjo Vladić (19 October 1950 – 18 June 2024) was a Bosnian professional footballer who played as a midfielder. He also briefly worked as a football manager.

== Club career ==
Vladić began his club career with the then-largest regional side in Herzegovina, Velež Mostar, where he played for a decade and excelled in midfield. He played in over 300 league games for Velež and scored over 70 goals and is remembered for being the part of the Velež three known as the "Mostar BMV" (Bajević, Marić and Vladić) during the 1960s, 70s and 80s.

On 28 June 1979 Vladić signed for AEK Athens, where he was reunited with his former teammate at Velež, Dušan Bajević. With AEK, he played only 21 times without being able to convince with his performance. In the summer of 1981, he returned to Velež, where he ended his football career after four years.

== International career ==
Vladić made his debut for Yugoslavia in an October 1972 friendly match away against England and made 26 appearances and scored 3 goals at the international level, competing in the 1974 FIFA World Cup and the UEFA Euro 1976. His final international was a February 1977 friendly match against Mexico.

== Managerial career ==
In the summer of 1995, Vladić became the new manager of Velež's fierce city rivals Zrinjski Mostar, who he led for one season until leaving the club in the summer of 1996.

== Death ==
Vladić died in his hometown of Mostar on 18 June 2024, at the age of 73.
