= Giorgos Chatziioannidis =

Greek footballer (1961–2012)

- Giorgos Chatziioannidis playing with AEK Athens.

Personal information
- Full name: Georgios Chatziioannidis
- Date of birth: 1 June 1961
- Place of birth: Petrea, Pella, Greece
- Date of death: 22 July 2012 (aged 51)
- Place of death: Skydra, Greece
- Height: 1.86 m (6 ft 1 in)
- Position: Striker

Youth career
- 1975–1978: Aetos Skydra
- 1978–1979: AEK Athens

Senior career*
Years	Team	Apps	(Gls)
1979–1984	AEK Athens	38	(3)
1980–1981	→ PAS Giannina (loan)	17	(6)
1984–1986	PAS Giannina		

International career
1978–1980	Greece U19		
- * Club domestic league appearances and goals

Giorgios Chatziioannidis (Greek: Γιώργος Χατζηιωαννίδης; 1 June 1961 – 22 July 2012) was a Greek professional footballer who played as striker.

== Club career ==
Chatziioannidis started playing football in 1975 at Aetos Skydra. On 21 June 1978, the youth team of AEK Athens went to Trikala, for the league final against the youth team of PAOK. The yellow-blacks won 1–0, claiming the title and afterwards they traveled to Skydra for a friendly match against the local club, in order for the officials of AEK to scout Chatziioannidis. Despite the 6–1 defeat for his club, the tall forward left an excellent impression and on 9 July 1978 he signed for AEK. Nevertheless Aetos Skydra weren't willing let him leave, despite the player taking part normally in the preparation of AEK and after a series of negotiations between both clubs, on 30 August 1978 Chatziioannidis was officially transferred to the yellow-blacks for the amount of 2.2 million drachmas.

In his first season in the club, Chatziioannidis played in their youth team, alongside players such as, Stelios Manolas, Lysandros Georgamlis and Vangelis Vlachos, where they won the championship by defeating the youth team of Panathinaikos in the final. In the meantime, František Fadrhonc, who has in charge of the infrastructure departments of AEK prepared a group of players to join the senior team, including Chatziioannidis, who signed a professional contract in the summer of 1979. Despite performing well and scoring in most friendly matches of the summer of 1979, he did not manage to establish himself in the offensive line of the team, which was consisted by Thomas Mavros and Dušan Bajević. Thus, in December 1980 he was loaned to the PAS Giannina to have more games on his feet. After a good spell with the team of Ioannina, he returned to AEK the following summer, but he again failed to establish himself after, among other things, he ran into Mojaš Radonjić, was acquired as a replacement for Bajević. With the "yellow-blacks" he won the Greek Cup in 1983. He left the club in the summer of 1984 and joined PAS Giannina.

== After football ==
After the end of his football career he served as deputy mayor of Skydra. He died on 22 July 2012, at the age of 51, after a long-term health problem.

== Honours ==
AEK Athens

- Greek Cup: 1982–83
