= Georgios Zindros =

Greek footballer

Personal information
- Full name: Georgios Zindros
- Date of birth: 1955 (age 70–71)
- Place of birth: Oradea, Romania
- Position: Winger

Youth career
- 1971–1973: Bihor Oradea

Senior career*
Years	Team	Apps	(Gls)
1973–1974	Bihor Oradea		
1974–1976	Universitatea Craiova	10	(0)
1976–1984	Aris	202	(46)
1984–1985	Olympiacos	5	(0)
1985–1987	Apollon Kalamarias	46	(4)
Total		254	(50)

International career
1980–1981	Greece	2	(0)
- * Club domestic league appearances and goals

Georgios Zindros (Greek: Γεώργιος Ζήνδρος; born in 1955) a Greek football player, was a star winger for Aris Thessaloniki F.C. during the golden period of the late 1970. He was born in Romania by Greek parents and started his career in Universitatea Craiova. In 1976, he was transferred to Aris after a demand from Alketas Panagoulias. After 202 appearances and 46 goal, he continued his career to Olympiakos and later to Apollon Kalamarias. He made two appearances for Greece national team.
