= Manolis Kottis =

Greek footballer

Personal information
- Full name: Emmanouil Kottis
- Date of birth: 25 January 1955 (age 71)
- Place of birth: Rhodes, Greece
- Height: 1.73 m (5 ft 8 in)
- Position: Forward

Youth career
- 1968–1972: Apollon Kalythies

Senior career*
Years	Team	Apps	(Gls)
1972–1980	Rodos	240	(122)
1980–1984	AEK Athens	51	(9)
1982	→ Rodos (loan)	17	(7)
1984–1985	Egaleo	33	(7)
1985	Greek American AA		
1986–1987	Atromitos	28	(9)
1987–1988	Lamia		
1990	Argonaftis Argos		
Total		369	(154)
- * Club domestic league appearances and goals

Manolis Kottis (Greek: Μανώλης Κώττης; born 25 January 1955) is a Greek former professional footballer who played as forward.

== Club career ==
=== Early years ===
Kottis started his football career through his older brother who played football for the team of Apollon Kalythies. At the age of 13, he trained with the club's youth team. At the age of 13, he trained with the youth team of the club and when he scored three goals in a friendly match of the division against Rodos, he was called by the officials of Apollon Kalythies and signed a sport's card with the team. His reputation as a prolific scorer began to spread in the football community of Rhodes. This recognition was further solidified when he scored twice in a friendly match against Rodos. Impressed, the officials of the island's big team visited Kottis at the carpentry workshop where he worked and offered him a contract which he signed for a fee of 30,000 drachmas.

=== Rodos ===
During the eight years he played with Rodos, he made sure to constantly prove his executive scoring ability, culminating in being named the top scorer of the second division in 1977 season with 28 goals, while also making a decisive contribution in the promotion of Rodos to the first division. He was the first player of Rodos to complete a hat-trick in the first division, as he did scoring all the goals for his club in the 3–1 win over PAS Giannina. The transfer rumors that had long started becoming more and more intense for Kottis, when in his first season with Rodos in the league as he emerged as the 2nd top scorer with 24 goals, tied with Dušan Bajević behind the 31 goals of Thomas Mavros. The main competitors for the player from Rhodes were AEK Athens and Olympiacos. In the summer of 1980 the president of AEK Athens, Loukas Barlos visited Rhodes alongside the official, Nikos Stratos and the vice-president, Petros Lalos in order to sign him, offering 2 million drachmas to Kottis. The player hesitating to leave Rhodes and doubting his acclimatization in Athens, counter-proposed the amount of 2.5 million, hoping for a setback from the president of AEK. To his surprise, the determination of Barlos emerged victorious since he agreed to the counter-proposal of Kottis. Thus, on 11 July the transfer became official with Rodos receiving the fee of 7.5 million drachmas plus Christos Kalaitzidis and Stelios Kaselakis as exchange.

=== AEK Athens ===
The deadly duo of Mavros-Bajević in attack with the "short-tall" model immediately brought Kottis to the prime position of competing Mavros for a place in the starting eleven. The role of Dušan Bajević passed on to Mojaš Radonjić, but the role of the "short" was difficult to claim due to the class and leading personality of Thomas Mavros. The difficulties of adapting to the Greek capital, led Kottis back to Rodos on 1 January 1982 as a loan for a year. On 1 December he returned to the double-headed eagle after his loan was expired. His acquaintance with the later wife from Nea Filadelfeia relieved to him from the difficulties of the life in Athens and the awareness in the administration of AEK that a partnership like the Mavros–Bajević was almost impossible to re-exist, gave Kottis the opportunities he was looking for to participate in the yellow-black jersey. He made his debut on 7 September 1980 in a 5–1 home win against Kavala. He won the Greek Cup in 1983 playing in the final in the 2–0 win against PAOK. He also scored in the 65th minute of the home win against Újpest on 14 September 1983, for the first round of the UEFA Cup Winners' Cup.

=== Later career ===
In the summer of 1984 the arrival of the striker Håkan Sandberg resulted in him being left out of the manager's plans. Thus on 1 December 1984 Kottis was transferred to Egaleo for 1 million drachmas, where he remained until the end of the season. This was followed by a spell at the United States, where he competed for two months in the US championship for New York City club, Greek American AA and was paid 10,000 dollars. Returning to Greece, he continued to play in Atromitos, Lamia and other clubs of lower divisions to complete his football career in 1990 at Argonaftis Argos.

== Personal life ==
The recent life of Kottis is divided between Athens, where his wife, Kleopatra and his daughter live, and Rhodes, where he works with the Cultural and Sports Organization of the island's Municipality while serving as General Leader and Vice President of the Rhodes team.

== Style of play ==
Kottis was a short player, with a low center of gravity and flexible, while he had a special feel in scoring goals. A real "fox" of the small and large opposing area who was often in the right place at the right time to score. Characteristics that were very similar to those of Thomas Mavros. Their similarity in style of play even extended to both their head-balling prowess despite their relatively short stature. In all the games he played as a partner of Mavros in the attacking line of AEK, the two of them made it unimaginably difficult for the opposing defenses and the goal seemed to be a matter of time either from one or the other.

== Honours ==
Rodos

- Beta Ethniki: 1977–78, 1980–81 (South Group)

AEK Athens

- Greek Cup: 1982–83

Individual

- Beta Ethniki top scorer: 1976–77 (South Group)
