= Vladimir Matijević (footballer) =

Bosnian-Herzegovina footballer

Personal information
- Date of birth: 2 January 1957
- Place of birth: Mostar, FPR Yugoslavia
- Date of death: 8 July 2015 (aged 58)
- Positions: Defender; midfielder

Senior career*
Years	Team	Apps	(Gls)
1974–1987	Velež Mostar	271	(29)

International career
1980–1984	Yugoslavia	3	(0)
- * Club domestic league appearances and goals

Vladimir Matijević (2 January 1957 – 8 July 2015) was a Bosnian-Herzegovinian football player. He earned three caps for Yugoslavia.

== Club career ==
He spent his entire career with hometown club Velež Mostar, captained them and won two Yugoslav Cups with Velež.

== International career ==
Dada Matijević made his debut for Yugoslavia in a March 1980 Balkan Cup match against Romania and has earned a total of 3 caps, scoring no goals. His final international was a September 1984 friendly match away against Scotland.

== Personal life and death ==
After retiring as a player, he had a bar in Mostar. He died of a long illness in 2015.

== Honours ==
- Yugoslav Cup: 2

1981, 1986
