= 1982–83 AEK Athens F.C. season =

AEK Athens
1982–83 season
- Chairman: Michalis Arkadis (until 21 June); Lefteris Panagidis
- Manager: Zlatko Čajkovski (until 10 January); Kostas Nestoridis (interim, until 13 February); Helmut Senekowitsch
- Stadium: AEK Stadium
- Alpha Ethniki: 3rd
- Greek Cup: Winners
- UEFA Cup: First round
- Top goalscorer: League: Thomas Mavros (19); All: Thomas Mavros (31)
- Highest home attendance: 35,572 vs Olympiacos (13 March 1983)
- Lowest home attendance: 2,098 vs Irodotos (9 March 1983)
- Average home league attendance: 12,954
- Biggest win: Irodotos 0–6 AEK Athens
- Biggest defeat: PAOK 5–0 AEK Athens
Home colours	Away colours

The 1982–83 season was the 59th season in the existence of AEK Athens F.C. and the 24th consecutive season in the top flight of Greek football. They competed in the Alpha Ethniki, the Greek Cup and the UEFA Cup. The season began on 19 September 1982 and finished on 29 June 1983.

== Kits ==
Supplier: Zita Hellas / Adidas
Sponsor(s): Citizen

Home	Away	Home 1982	Away 1982

== Overview ==
In the summer of 1982, Andreas Zafiropoulos stepped down as president of AEK Athens due to the "displeasure" of the supporters. He retained the team's shares, but handed over the management of the team to the shipowner Michalis Arkadis. Arkadis was for years the right-hand man of Loukas Barlos, while apart from president, he also served as vice president and general manager of the club. Takis Nikoloudis returned to the team after his spell at Olympiacos, while AEK also proceeded with the transfer of the goalkeeper Christos Arvanitis. Hristo Bonev left the team and returned to Lokomotiv Plovdiv. Zlatko Čajkovski remained as manager, thus retaining his position after the team's strong finish the previous season, which found AEK competing in the UEFA Cup.

After an absence of two years, AEK participated in the UEFA Cup, facing Köln of Rinus Michels, which had finished as runners-up in the Bundesliga the previous season, featuring players such as Littbarski, Fischer, Alofs, Steiner and Schumacher. The first match took place on 14 September, however, it was not completed due to the large fire at Tatoi and the inevitable power outage of the stadium at the 88th minute without AEK being responsible. In the match, AEK took an early lead, however, trapped in the slow pace of the Germans, the score was turned around by the 33rd minute with AEK managing to equalise just before half-time. In the second half, AEK increased their offensive pace and went 3–2 up, but conceded an equaliser almost immediately. As the game progressed, AEK were pushing on, until in the 88th minute the stadium suffered a power outage. The match was stopped, discussions followed and the referee rejected the proposal to end the match at that point. The suspension of the game was decided and the game was scheduled to be repeated two weeks later, on 28 September. Both managers changed their tactics based on the conclusions from the first match. In the replay, AEK took the initiative, however, the goal conceded in the 58th minute and the fatigue of the players led to a defeat, making qualification even more difficult. AEK produced a disappointing performance, as the players could not even keep possession. As if this were not enough, Mavros also missed a penalty when the score was at 4–0, in an opportunity to reduce the extent of the score. On the other hand, the Germans fielded a fast-paced side and dominated the match, scoring five goals, while missing further chances, but they did not succeed thanks to the decent performance of Arvanitis. The 6,000 Greeks were present at the stadium, expressed their dissatisfaction with the overall image of the team and left extremely disappointed.

Even though the Championship started with a defeat by Ethnikos Piraeus, the team continued well. As time progressed, the relations of some players with the manager, as well as the concerns of the management of the club about the physical condition of the players, caused controversy in the face of the manager. This culminated in the home match of the 13th matchday against OFI. AEK were leading by 2–0 and eventually were defeated by 2–3, which resulted in the dismissal of Čajkovski. The decision to dismiss the Croatian manager was opposed by the vast majority of the fans of the club, as until that moment AEK were in the race for the championship, just 1 point behind the first Olympiacos. Kostas Nestoridis took charge of the team for the next five games. From the 19th matchday onwards, Helmut Senekowitsch, well known for his spells at Panathinaikos and Olympiacos, was appointed manager. The constant changes of manager also affected the performance of the team. The team finished in third place, level on points with AEL and 5 points behind the Olympiacos. Thomas Mavros emerged as the club's top scorer in the league with 19 goals.

In the Cup, AEK started the tournament sluggishly, eliminating Kilkisiakos by 2–1 at Kilkis for the first round, but from that moment on, the path became easier. For the round of 32 they eliminated Panserraikos by 4–2 at home. Afterwards they easily overcame Irodotos at the round of 16 with wins at both legs and in the quarter-finals they faced Olympiacos. In the first leg at Nea Filadelfeia, Olympiacos took the lead early on, but AEK played with passion, took the initiative and in the second half, they turned the match with two goals by Mavros. At the rematch, the red and whites came out strong and were creating a lot of chances, even hitting the woodwork twice, however as the match progressed, the yellow-blacks improved their performance and in the final 15 minutes they took the lead with Mavros. Nothing changed until the final whistle, with AEK securing qualification after winning both legs against their rivals. In the semi-finals AEK's opponent was Iraklis. In the first game of Thessaloniki, AEK were terrible and found themselves losing by 3–0 in the opening minutes of the second half, only managing to reduce to 3–1 with Kottis. In a packed AEK Stadium at the rematch, the yellow-blacks started the match determined and scored the two goals they needed to qualify early in the game. The pace of the match dropped and AEK eventually booked their place in the final. AEK's opponents in the final were PAOK, at the newly built Olympic Stadium which was packed. AEK appeared passionate and disciplined, however PAOK with their offensive game, created several goalscoring chances. Nevertheless, the yellow-blacks were more clinical and took the lead in the first half with Mavros. While the match was coming to its end, AEK doubled their lead with their young captain, Vlachos and sealed a 2–0 victory that gave them the trophy. There were also incidents inside and outside the stadium between supporters of both sides, with the damage to the stadium being divided for payment between the HFF, AEK and PAOK.

== Management team ==
Position	Staff
Manager	(Austria) Helmut Senekowitsch
Assistant manager	(Greece) Giorgos Kefalidis
Assistant manager	(Greece) Kostas Nestoridis
Goalkeeping coach	(Greece) Stelios Serafidis
Head of Medical	(Greece) Lakis Nikolaou

== Players ==
=== Squad information ===
NOTE: The players are the ones that have been announced by the AEK Athens' press release. No edits should be made unless a player arrival or exit is announced. Updated 29 June 1983, 23:59 UTC+3.

Player	Nat.	Position(s)	Date of birth (Age)	Signed	Previous club	Transfer fee	Contract until
Goalkeepers
Lakis Stergioudas	(Greece)	GK	11 December 1952 (aged 30)	1972	(Greece) Niki Polygyros	₯36,000	1985
Christos Arvanitis	(Greece)	GK	23 January 1953 (aged 30)	1982	(Greece) Olympiacos	₯7,000,000	1986
Spyros Ikonomopoulos	(Greece)	GK	25 July 1959 (aged 23)	1979	(Greece) AEK Athens U20	—	1984
Fanis Kofinas	(Greece)	GK	5 September 1960 (aged 22)	1982	(Greece) Pelopas Kiato	Free	1987
Defenders
Michalis Tzirakis	(Greece)	CB / RB / RM	6 March 1954 (aged 29)	1980	(Greece) OFI	₯8,000,000	1985
Petros Ravousis (Vice-captain)	(Greece)	CB / RB	1 October 1954 (aged 28)	1972	(Greece) Aetos Skydra	Free	1985
Vangelis Paraprastanitis	(Greece)	LB / CB / DM	10 February 1955 (aged 28)	1980	(Greece) Trikala	₯4,000,000	1985
Stavros Letsas	(Greece)	RB / RM / CB	6 March 1957 (aged 26)	1979	(Greece) Agioi Anargyroi	Free	1986
Panagiotis Stylianopoulos	(Greece)	RB / LB / RM / DM	4 September 1957 (aged 25)	1978	(Greece) AEK Athens U20	—	1986
Takis Karagiozopoulos	(Greece)	CB / DM / ST	4 February 1961 (aged 22)	1981	(Greece) Veria	₯8,000,000	1986
Stelios Manolas	(Greece)	CB / RB	13 July 1961 (aged 21)	1980	(Greece) AEK Athens U20	—	1984
Lysandros Georgamlis	(Greece)	RB / CB / DM / LB	25 February 1962 (aged 21)	1980	(Greece) AEK Athens U20	—	1985
Midfielders
Christos Ardizoglou	(Greece) (Israel)	RM / LM / RW / LW / AM / RB / LB	25 March 1953 (aged 30)	1974	(Greece) Apollon Athens	₯12,000,000	1986
Angel Kolev	(Bulgaria)	AM / RM / LM	22 August 1953 (aged 29)	1982	(Bulgaria) Lokomotiv Sofia	Free	1984
Spyros Thodis	(Greece)	CM / AM / DM	23 July 1955 (aged 27)	1979	(Greece) Anagennisi Karditsa	₯4,000,000	1984
Dinos Ballis	(Greece)	AM / CM / DM / SS / ST / CB	25 May 1957 (aged 26)	1981	(Greece) Aris	₯17,000,000	1986
Giorgos Vlantis	(Greece)	CM / AM	30 January 1958 (aged 25)	1976	(Greece) AEK Athens U20	—	1984
Vangelis Vlachos (Captain)	(Greece)	AM / CM / RM / LM	6 January 1962 (aged 21)	1979	(Greece) AEK Athens U20	—	1984
Forwards
Mojaš Radonjić	(Socialist Federal Republic of Yugoslavia)	ST / SS	23 February 1950 (aged 33)	1981	(Socialist Federal Republic of Yugoslavia) Budućnost Podgorica	₯9,000,000	1984
Thomas Mavros	(Greece)	ST / LW	31 May 1954 (aged 29)	1976	(Greece) Panionios	₯10,000,000	1987
Manolis Kottis	(Greece)	ST / LW / RW	25 January 1955 (aged 28)	1980	(Greece) Rodos	₯7,500,000	1985
Giannis Dintsikos	(Greece)	ST / SS / RW / LW / AM	25 June 1960 (aged 23)	1981	(Greece) Kastoria	₯20,000,000	1986
Giorgos Chatziioannidis	(Greece)	ST	1 June 1961 (aged 22)	1979	(Greece) AEK Athens U20	—	1984
Panagiotis Angelidis	(Greece)	RW / ST	27 July 1961 (aged 21)	1982	(Greece) AEK Athens U20	Free	1986
Christos Tatidis	(Greece)	LW	8 May 1962 (aged 21)	1982	(Greece) AEK Athens U20	—	1987
Left during Winter Transfer Window
Takis Nikoloudis	(Greece)	CM / AM / RM / LM	26 August 1951 (aged 31)	1982	(Greece) Olympiacos	₯4,000,000	1984
Petros Karavitis	(Greece)	DM / CB / CM / LB / LM / LW	11 March 1952 (aged 31)	1980	(Greece) Olympiacos	Free	1983

== Transfers ==
=== In ===
==== Summer ====
Pos.	Player	From	Fee	Date	Contract Until	Source
GK	(Greece) Christos Arvanitis	(Greece) Olympiacos	₯7,000,000	25 July 1982	30 June 1986	
GK	(Greece) Fanis Kofinas	(Greece) Pelopas Kiato	₯1,500,000^{[a]}	26 July 1982	30 June 1987	
GK	(Greece) Dimitris Alafogiannis	(Greece) Atromitos	Loan return	1 July 1982	30 June 1986	
MF	(Greece) Takis Nikoloudis	(Greece) Olympiacos	₯4,000,000	25 July 1982	30 June 1984	
MF	(Greece) Giorgos Vlantis	(Greece) Diagoras	Loan return	1 July 1982	30 November 1984	
MF	(Bulgaria) Angel Kolev	(Bulgaria) Lokomotiv Sofia	₯3,500,000	21 July 1982	30 June 1984	
FW	(Greece) Christos Tatidis	(Greece) AEK Athens U20	Promotion	1 July 1982	30 June 1987	

==== Winter ====
Pos.	Player	From	Fee	Date	Contract Until	Source
FW	(Greece) Manolis Kottis	(Greece) Rodos	Loan return	1 December 1982	30 June 1985	

Notes

a. Plus a conduction of a friendly match between the two clubs.

=== Out ===
==== Summer ====
Pos.	Player	To	Fee	Date	Source
GK	(Greece) Nikos Christidis	Retired		30 July 1982	
GK	(Greece) Dimitris Alafogiannis	(Greece) Vyzas Megara	Contract termination	5 August 1982	
DF	(Greece) Lakis Nikolaou	Retired		30 June 1982	
DF	(Greece) Giorgos Rigas	(Greece) Makedonikos	Contract termination	2 August 1982	
DF	(Greece) Giannis Mousouris	(Greece) Veria	Contract termination	24 September 1982	
MF	(Bulgaria) Hristo Bonev	(Bulgaria) Lokomotiv Plovdiv	End of contract	30 July 1982	

==== Winter ====
Pos.	Player	To	Fee	Date	Source
MF	(Greece) Petros Karavitis	(Greece) Proodeftiki	Free transfer	11 December 1982	

=== Loan out ===
==== Winter ====
Pos.	Player	To	Fee	Date	Until	Option to buy	Source
MF	(Greece) Takis Nikoloudis	(Canada) Inter-Montréal	Free	2 June 1983	10 September 1983	✗	

=== Contract renewals ===
Pos.	Player	Date	Former Exp. Date	New Exp. Date	Source
FW	(Greece) Thomas Mavros	20 June 1983	30 June 1983	30 June 1987	

=== Overall transfer activity ===
==== Expenditure ====
Summer: ▼ ₯16,000,000

Winter: ▼ ₯0

Total: ▼ ₯16,000,000

==== Income ====
Summer: ▲ ₯0

Winter: ▲ ₯0

Total: ▲ ₯0

==== Net Totals ====
Summer: ▼ ₯16,000,000

Winter: ₯0

Total: ▼ ₯16,000,000

== Pre-season and friendlies ==
21 July 1982 Friendly	SC Freiburg	1–1	AEK Athens	Gutach
20:00 EEST (UTC+3)	Schüler 38'	Report	Letsas (yellow card); Vlachos (yellow card); Tzirakis (yellow card); Georgamlis 35'	Referee: Chontap (West Germany)

23 July 1982 Friendly	Offenburger FV	2–4	AEK Athens	Offenburg
20:00 EEST (UTC+3)	Hartmann 43'; Bedrum 48'	Report	Radonjić 54', 65'; Mavros 68', 85'	Stadium: Karl-Heitz-Stadion; Attendance: 2,500; Referee: Chontap (West Germany)

24 July 1982 Friendly	Borussia Neunkirchen	0–1	AEK Athens	Neunkirchen
16:30 EEST (UTC+3)		Report	Radonjić (yellow card) 13'; Klaus 42' (o.g.); Paraprastanitis (yellow card) 79'	Stadium: Ellenfeldstadion; Referee: Werner Föckler (West Germany)

26 July 1982 Friendly	Obergrombach	0–12	AEK Athens	Freiburg
19:00 EEST (UTC+3)	Yellow card	Report	Vlachos 15', 23', 50', 62', 86'; Ballis 22', 26', 77'; Angelidis 55'; Karavitis 66'; Manolas 75'; Paraprastanitis 82'	Attendance: 2,000; Referee: Schwabeland (West Germany)

27 July 1982 Friendly	Gutach	2–8	AEK Athens	Freiburg
19:00 EEST (UTC+3)	Wölfle 33'; Pantazis 57' (o.g.)	Report	Dintsikos 25', 36', 48'; Manolas 26', 81'; Tatidis 30'; Radonjić 44'; Angelidis 63'
Note: Lakis Nikolaou, who retired as a footballer a few months ago and exclusively served as the club's doctor and the physiotherapist, Nikos Pantazis competed with AEK.

28 July 1982 Friendly	Lörrach	0–4	AEK Athens	Lörrach
19:00 EEST (UTC+3)		Report	Dintsikos 30'; Vlachos 47'; Radonjić 49'; Angelidis 84'	Stadium: Grüttpark Stadium; Attendance: 2,000; Referee: Brakrammer (West Germany)

30 July 1982 Friendly	Kickers Offenbach	2–2	AEK Athens	Offenbach
21:00 EEST (UTC+3)	Bein 23'; Rudel 73'	Report	Georgamlis (yellow card) 12'; Manolas 15'; Dintsikos 47'	Stadium: Stadion am Bieberer Berg; Attendance: 7,000; Referee: Winfried Walz (West Germany)

2 August 1982 Friendly	AEK Athens	2–1	Velež Mostar	Nea Filadelfeia
21:00 EEST (UTC+3)	Vlachos 3'; Georgamlis 35'	Report	Medjedović 33'	Stadium: AEK Stadium; Attendance: 15,617; Referee: Christos Kolokythas (Athens)

6 August 1982 Friendly	AEK Athens	6–1	Egaleo	Nea Filadelfeia
21:00 EEST (UTC+3)	Ardizoglou 8'; Ballis 16'; Nikoloudis 25', 40' (pen.); Radonjić 35' (pen.); Vlachos 54'	Report	Pigaditis (penalty missed) 74'; Vonortas 89'	Stadium: AEK Stadium; Attendance: 5,000; Referee: Nikos Karathanasis (Athens)

11 August 1982 Friendly	AEK Athens	0–1	Baník Ostrava	Nea Filadelfeia
21:00 EEST (UTC+3)	Karavitis (penalty missed) 82'	Report	Daněk 44'	Stadium: AEK Stadium; Attendance: 10,000; Referee: Giorgos Saraliotis (Kavala)

14 August 1982 Friendly	Irodotos	1–4	AEK Athens	Heraklion
18:00 EEST (UTC+3)	Bakousis 20'	Report	Kolev 5'; Karavitis 30'; Thodis 65'; Angelidis 88'	Stadium: Municipal Nea Alikarnassos Stadium; Attendance: 3,000; Referee: Giorgos Koukoulakis (Heraklion)

16 August 1982 Friendly	AEK Athens	1–0	Manchester City	Nea Filadelfeia
21:00 EEST (UTC+3)	Tueart 34' (o.g.)	Report		Stadium: AEK Stadium; Attendance: 8,942; Referee: Giorgos Kounalakis (Heraklion)

19 August 1982 Friendly	AEK Athens	0–1	17 Nëntori	Nea Filadelfeia
21:00 EEST (UTC+3)		Report	Luçi 76'	Stadium: AEK Stadium; Attendance: 8,000; Referee: Kostas Dimitriadis (Piraeus)

23 August 1982 Friendly	AEK Athens	2–2	Olympiacos	Nea Filadelfeia
21:00 EEST (UTC+3)	Dintsikos 27'; Mavros 34'; Manolas (yellow card) 62'; Vlachos (yellow card) 72'	Report	Anastopoulos 10'; Mitropoulos (yellow card) 27'; Kousoulakis 70' (pen.)	Stadium: AEK Stadium; Attendance: 35,000; Referee: Giannis Machaliotis (Athens)

25 August 1982 Friendly	AEK Athens	1–0	Ferencváros	Nea Filadelfeia
21:00 EEST (UTC+3)	Nikoloudis 64'	Report	Ebedli (yellow card) 75'	Stadium: AEK Stadium; Attendance: 2,400; Referee: Leonidas Panagopoulos (Athens)

27 August 1982 Friendly	AEK Athens	2–1	Aris	Nea Filadelfeia
21:00 EEST (UTC+3)	Dintsikos 27'; Radonjić 73'	Report	Zelelidis 76'	Stadium: AEK Stadium; Attendance: 7,000; Referee: Megas (Athens)

29 August 1982 Friendly	Chalkida	2–2	AEK Athens	Chalcis
17:30 EEST (UTC+3)	Fokos 38'; Mastrantonas (penalty missed) 61'; Panagiotidis 75' (pen.)	Report	Tzirakis 35', (yellow card) 42'; Karagiozopoulos (red card) 60'; Ardizoglou 80'	Stadium: Municipal Stadium of Chalkida; Attendance: 2,000; Referee: Babaniotis

30 August 1982 Friendly	PAOK	4–1	AEK Athens	Thessaloniki
21:00 EEST (UTC+3)	Dimopoulos 8', 18', 72'; Trimhold 56' (pen.)	Report	Mavros 28'	Stadium: Toumba Stadium; Attendance: 5,366; Referee: Vasilis Tikmoglou (Thessaloniki)

5 September 1982 Friendly	Panetolikos	2–1	AEK Athens	Agrinio
17:30 EEST (UTC+3)	Tzekos 4'; Boulieris 55'	Report	Kolev 88'	Stadium: Panetolikos Stadium; Referee: Tsironis

8 September 1982 Friendly	Iraklis	1–1	AEK Athens	Thessaloniki
21:00 EEST (UTC+3)	Papaioannou 32'	Report	Georgamlis 59'	Stadium: Kaftanzoglio Stadium; Attendance: 3,711; Referee: Basbarelias

23 September 1982 Friendly	Aias Salamina	0–0	AEK Athens	Salamina
17:00 EEST (UTC+3)		Report		Stadium: Municipal Stadium of Salamina; Referee: Glynis

14 October 1982 Friendly	AEK Athens	7–1	Kallithea	Nea Filadelfeia
15:30 EEST (UTC+3)	Ballis; Chatziioannidis; Karagiozopoulos; Vlantis; Manolas	Report	Konstantinidis; Kypritidis (penalty missed) 35'	Stadium: AEK Stadium; Referee: Lakis Nikolaou

20 October 1982 Friendly	Panachaiki	3–3	AEK Athens	Patras
15:15 EEST (UTC+3)	Tsambas 28'; Paraprastanitis 46' (o.g.); Chardalias 85'	Report	Dintsikos 33'; Chatziioannidis 39'; Kyzas 88' (o.g.)	Stadium: Panachaiki Stadium; Attendance: 2,000; Referee: Probonas

25 October 1982 Friendly	AEK Athens	2–0	Apollon Athens	Nea Filadelfeia
15:30 EEST (UTC+3)	Oddine 3'; Dintsikos 33'	Report		Stadium: AEK Stadium; Attendance: 3,000; Referee: Makis Germanakos (Athens)

27 October 1982 Friendly	AEK Athens	11–1	AEK Athens Veterans	Nea Filadelfeia
15:30 EEST (UTC+3)	Chatziioannidis 3', 12', 28'; Dintsikos 7', 22', 36'; Karagiozopoulos 16'; Angelidis 19'; Radonjić 57', 81'; Vlachos 62'	Report	Nestoridis 42' (pen.)	Stadium: AEK Stadium; Attendance: 860; Referee: Christos Kolokythas (Athens)
Note: The team of the veterans was consisted of Konstantinidis, Vasiliou, Kefalidis, Karakidis, Nikolaou, Sevastopoulos, Ventouris, Karafeskos, Nestoridis, Domazos, Pomonis, Maniateas, Stathopoulos, Papageorgiou, Petridis, Errea, Sofianidis and Yordan, while they were coached by Tzanetis.

3 November 1982 Friendly	AEK Athens	6–0	Panelefsiniakos	Nea Filadelfeia
15:00 EET (UTC+2)	Mavros 6' (pen.); Dintsikos 15'; Nikoloudis 45'; Chatziioannidis 58', 88'; Radonjić 82'	Report		Stadium: AEK Stadium; Attendance: 156; Referee: Giorgos Saraliotis (Kavala)

10 November 1982 Friendly	Apollon Athens	2–3	AEK Athens	Rizoupoli
15:00 EET (UTC+2)	Svoronos 27', 62'	Report	Angelidis 23'; Karagiozopoulos 25', 33' (pen.)	Stadium: Rizoupoli Stadium; Referee: Leonidas Panagopoulos (Athens)

13 November 1982 Friendly	AEK Athens	0–2	PAS Giannina	Nea Filadelfeia
14:45 EET (UTC+2)		Report	Kontogiorgakis 37'; Giavasis 84'	Stadium: AEK Stadium; Attendance: 881; Referee: Giorgos Voulgaris (Athens)

24 November 1982 Friendly	Egaleo	1–1	AEK Athens	Aigaleo
15:00 EET (UTC+2)	Tsikas 8'	Report	Ballis 26'	Stadium: Aigaleo Municipal Stadium; Referee: Chatziantoniou
Note: Since there was no referee sent for the match the officials of Egaleo, Chatziantoniou and Alexiou were the referees for one half each. The goalkeeper of Egaleo, Vallianos was the linesman, but after a while he gave up.

8 December 1982 Friendly	AO Kalamaki	0–6	AEK Athens	Kalamaki
15:00 EET (UTC+2)		Report	Nikoloudis 14', 55'; Dintsikos 26', 42'; Ballis 30' (pen.); Kolev 83'	Stadium: Kalamaki Municipal Stadium; Referee: Agadis

5 January 1983 Friendly	AEK Athens	1–1	Bulgaria	Nea Filadelfeia
15:00 EET (UTC+2)	Mavros 47'	Report	Petrov 61'	Stadium: AEK Stadium; Attendance: 2,000; Referee: Makis Germanakos (Athens)

11 January 1983 Friendly	AEK Athens	1–4	Eintracht Frankfurt	Nea Filadelfeia
15:00 EET (UTC+2)	Ardizoglou (penalty missed) 29'; Chatziioannidis 74'	Report	Cha 17', 22'; Schreml (yellow card) 55'; Borchers 64'; Berthold 83'	Stadium: AEK Stadium; Attendance: 2,000; Referee: Nikos Karathanasis (Athens)
Note: Mimis Papaioannou played with AEK Athens.

23 February 1983 Friendly	AEK Athens	7–0	Akadimos	Nea Filadelfeia
15:30 EET (UTC+2)	Vlantis; Radonjić; Papaioannou; Laing	Report		Stadium: AEK Stadium; Attendance: 362; Referee: Sofia Tziriktzidou
Note: Mimis Papaioannou played with AEK Athens. The incomes of the match went to the veteran footballer, Kyriakos Makris, who had a heart condition.

23 April 1983 Friendly	AEK Athens	0–1	Ethnikos Piraeus	Nea Filadelfeia
16:30 EEST (UTC+3)		Report	Kottidis 24'	Stadium: AEK Stadium; Attendance: 1,000; Referee: Meletis Voutsaras (Athens)

27 April 1983 Friendly	Korinthos	1–2	AEK Athens	Corinth
14:30 EEST (UTC+3)	Pappas 87'	Report	Zarkos 5' (o.g.); Dintsikos 53'	Stadium: Korinthos Stadium; Attendance: 1,500; Referee: Konstantinos Karapatas (Corinthia)

== Competitions ==
=== Overall record ===
Competition	First match	Last match	Starting round	Final position	Record							
Competition	First match	Last match	Starting round	Final position	Pld	W	D	L	GF	GA	GD	Win %
Alpha Ethniki	19 September 1982	26 June 1983	Matchday 1	3rd	34	19	7	8	54	39	+15	55.88
Greek Cup	15 December 1982	29 June 1983	First round	Winners	9	8	0	1	23	8	+15	88.89
UEFA Cup	28 September 1982	6 October 1982	First round	First round	2	0	0	2	0	6	−6	0.00
Total					45	27	7	11	77	53	+24	60.00

Last updated: 29 June 1983
Source: Competitions

=== Alpha Ethniki ===
==== League table ====
Pos	Team	Pld	W	D	L	GF	GA	GD	Pts	Qualification or relegation
1	Olympiacos (C)	34	20	10	4	50	22	+28	50	Qualification for European Cup first round
2	AEL	34	18	9	7	54	27	+27	45	Qualification for UEFA Cup first round
3	AEK Athens	34	19	7	8	54	39	+15	45	Qualification for Cup Winners' Cup first round
4	PAOK	34	18	6	10	49	28	+21	42	Qualification for UEFA Cup first round
5	Aris	34	15	11	8	35	23	+12	41	

Source: RSSSF
Rules for classification: 1st points; 2nd decision match; 3rd head-to-head goal difference.
(C) Champions

==== Results summary ====
Overall								Home						Away					
Pld	W	D	L	GF	GA	GD	Pts	W	D	L	GF	GA	GD	W	D	L	GF	GA	GD
34	19	7	8	54	39	+15	45	14	1	2	39	14	+25	5	6	6	15	25	−10

Source: Competitive matches

==== Results by Matchday ====
Round	1	2	3	4	5	6	7	8	9	10	11	12	13	14	15	16	17	18	19	20	21	22	23	24	25	26	27	28	29	30	31	32	33	34
Ground	A	H	A	H	A	H	A	H	H	A	H	A	H	A	H	A	A	H	A	H	A	H	A	H	A	A	H	A	H	A	H	A	H	H
Result	L	W	W	W	D	W	W	W	W	L	W	D	L	D	W	W	D	W	W	W	L	D	W	W	L	L	L	D	W	L	W	D	W	W
Position	16	10	9	1	4	3	1	1	1	1	1	2	2	2	2	2	2	2	2	2	2	2	2	2	2	3	3	4	3	5	4	3	3	3

Source: Competitive matches
A = Away; H = Home; W = Win; D = Draw; L = Loss; P = Postponed

==== Matches ====
19 September 1982 1	Ethnikos Piraeus	2–0	AEK Athens	Piraeus
16:45 EEST (UTC+3)	Kottidis 13', 47'			Stadium: Karaiskakis Stadium; Attendance: 16,931; Referee: Nikos Filippiadis (Thessaloniki)

26 September 1982 2	AEK Athens	4–0	Rodos	Nea Filadelfeia
15:30 EEST (UTC+3)	Mavros 2', 8', 38' (pen.); Radonjić 28'		Christoforidis (yellow card) 56'	Stadium: AEK Stadium; Attendance: 7,551; Referee: Theoklis Kontzalis (Thessaloniki)

3 October 1982 3	Kastoria	2–3	AEK Athens	Kastoria
15:30 EEST (UTC+3)	Tsironis 18' (pen.), (yellow card) 21'; Liolios 68'		Radonjić 25', (yellow card) 28'; Vlachos (yellow card) 69'; Mavros 79' (pen.); Letsas 86'	Stadium: Municipal Stadium of Kastoria; Attendance: 2,549; Referee: Giannis Georgiadis (Drama)

31 October 1982 4	AEK Athens	2–0	Panserraikos	Nea Filadelfeia
14:45 EET (UTC+2)	Mavros 2'; Dintsikos 44'		Aritzis (yellow card) 38'; Aivazidis (yellow card) 54'	Stadium: AEK Stadium; Attendance: 7,841; Referee: Giorgos Pournatzis (Thessaloniki)

7 November 1982 5	Olympiacos	1–1	AEK Athens	Piraeus
14:45 EET (UTC+2)	Kousoulakis 29'; Anastopoulos (penalty missed) 81'		Radonjić 27', (yellow card) 49'; Mavros (penalty missed) 56'	Stadium: Karaiskakis Stadium; Attendance: 28,362; Referee: Panagiotis Tsolakidis (Thessaloniki)

21 November 1982 6	AEK Athens	1–0	Panionios	Nea Filadelfeia
14:45 EET (UTC+2)	Vlachos 22'			Stadium: AEK Stadium; Attendance: 9,389; Referee: Leonidas Panagopoulos (Athens)

28 November 1982 7	Panathinaikos	1–2	AEK Athens	Ampelokipoi
14:15 EET (UTC+2)	Kapsis (yellow card); Dimopoulos 24'		Dintsikos (yellow card); Ardizoglou (yellow card); Vlachos 29', 49', (yellow card)	Stadium: Leoforos Alexandras Stadium; Attendance: 24,000; Referee: Panagiotis Koutris (Thessaloniki)

5 December 1982 8	AEK Athens	3–0	AEL	Nea Filadelfeia
14:45 EET (UTC+2)	Radonjić 33', (yellow card) 43'; Karagiozopoulos 47' (pen.); Mavros 85' (pen.)		Parafestas (yellow card) 5'; Mitsibonas (yellow card) 80'	Stadium: AEK Stadium; Attendance: 8,596; Referee: Petros Kalpakidis (Thessaloniki)

12 December 1982 9	AEK Athens	3–1	Makedonikos	Nea Filadelfeia
14:45 EET (UTC+2)	Paraprastanitis 14'; Ardizoglou 41'; Mavros 43' (pen.)		Karamichalos 90'	Stadium: AEK Stadium; Attendance: 4,450; Referee: Pantelis Argyriou (Dodecanese)

19 December 1982 10	PAOK	5–0	AEK Athens	Thessaloniki
	Koudas 11'; Psarras (yellow card) 37'; Kostikos 50'; Dimopoulos 60', 69', 85'		Radonjić (yellow card) 28'; Ballis (yellow card) 37'	Stadium: Toumba Stadium; Attendance: 10,468; Referee: Dimitris Koutoulas (Serres)

27 December 1982 11	AEK Athens	2–1	Aris	Nea Filadelfeia
14:45 EET (UTC+2)	Nikoloudis (yellow card); Radonjić (yellow card); Ardizoglou 75'; Firos 89' (o.g.)		Firos (yellow card); Chatziantoniou (yellow card); Doulgerakis 69'	Stadium: AEK Stadium; Attendance: 17,438; Referee: Michalis Matsoukas (Euboea)

3 January 1983 12	Doxa Drama	0–0	AEK Athens	Drama
				Stadium: Doxa Drama Stadium; Attendance: 7,811; Referee: Giorgos Koukoulakis (Heraklion)

9 January 1983 13	AEK Athens	2–3	OFI	Nea Filadelfeia
14:45 EET (UTC+2)	Mavros 9'; Manolas 26'		Tsirimokos 30', 67'; Georgiadis 54'	Stadium: AEK Stadium; Attendance: 14,819; Referee: Kyriakos Kontogiannidis (Thrace)

16 January 1983 14	Iraklis	2–2	AEK Athens	Thessaloniki
	Papadopoulos 28'; Papaioannou 87'		Stylianopoulos (yellow card) 54'; Mavros 55', 77'; Dintsikos (yellow card) 77'	Stadium: Kaftanzoglio Stadium; Attendance: 16,258; Referee: Lampros Michailidis (Piraeus)

23 January 1983 15	AEK Athens	1–0	Panachaiki	Nea Filadelfeia
14:45 EET (UTC+2)	Ardizoglou 36'; Letsas (yellow card) 71'; Tzirakis (yellow card) 88'		Mitseas (yellow card) 21'; Spanosotiropoulos (yellow card) 37'; Davourlis (yellow card) 71'	Stadium: AEK Stadium; Attendance: 11,833; Referee: Athanasios Stamatis (Piraeus)

30 January 1983 16	Apollon Athens	0–1	AEK Athens	Rizoupoli
14:45 EET (UTC+2)			Vlachos 44'	Stadium: Rizoupoli Stadium; Attendance: 12,278; Referee: Tasos Kaklamanos (Arcadia)

6 February 1983 17	PAS Giannina	1–1	AEK Athens	Ioannina
15:15 EET (UTC+2)	Liakos (penalty missed) 32'; Petriniotis 48'; Seitaridis (yellow card) 52'		Nikoloudis 69'	Stadium: Zosimades Stadium; Attendance: 9,556; Referee: Dimitris Naoum (Thessaloniki)

13 February 1983 18	AEK Athens	1–0	Ethnikos Piraeus	Nea Filadelfeia
15:15 EET (UTC+2)	Vlachos 45'		Peppes (yellow card) 54'	Stadium: AEK Stadium; Attendance: 15,581; Referee: Petros Kalpakidis (Thessaloniki)

20 February 1983 19	Rodos	0–2 (Awarded)	AEK Athens	Ialysos
17:30 EEST (UTC+3)	Papaoikonomou (yellow card) 13', (goal) 20' (pen.), (red card) 60'; Labrinos (yellow card) 28'; Drakos (yellow card) 55', (red card) 60'; Englezos (red card) 60'; Papaioannou (yellow card) 80'		Mavros (yellow card) 15', (goal) 23'; Chatziioannidis 30'	Stadium: Municipal Stadium Ekonomideio; Attendance: 4,673; Referee: Nikos Kapetanakis (Piraeus)
Note: Since Rodos were left with 8 men after the 3 red cards that were shown to their players for swearing at the referee, they decided to disrupt the game. Mavroudis and Papaioannou faked injury and withdrew from the match at the 84th and 87th minute respectively, leaving their team with 6 players. Thus, the match was abandoned at the expense of Rodos and was awarded to AEK by 0–2. The goals scored in the match did not count, as the victory was awarded to AEK without a match.

27 February 1983 20	AEK Athens	2–0	Kastoria	Nea Filadelfeia
15:15 EET (UTC+2)	Mavros 29', 85'			Stadium: AEK Stadium; Attendance: 12,076; Referee: Anastasiadis (Piraeus)

6 March 1983 21	Panserraikos	1–0	AEK Athens	Serres
15:15 EET (UTC+2)	Batis 23' (pen.), (yellow card) 89'; Papadimitriou (yellow card) 83'		Manolas (yellow card) 40'	Stadium: Serres Municipal Stadium; Attendance: 7,667; Referee: Giorgos Pournatzis (Thessaloniki)

13 March 1983 22	AEK Athens	1–1	Olympiacos	Nea Filadelfeia
15:15 EET (UTC+2)	Mavros 39'		Anastopoulos 63' (pen.)	Stadium: AEK Stadium; Attendance: 35,572; Referee: Giannis Georgiadis (Drama)

20 March 1983 23	Panionios	0–1	AEK Athens	Nea Smyrni
15:15 EET (UTC+2)			Mavros 24'	Stadium: Nea Smyrni Stadium; Attendance: 11,857; Referee: Dimitris Naoum (Thessaloniki)

3 April 1983 24	AEK Athens	4–1	Panathinaikos	Nea Filadelfeia
16:30 EEST (UTC+3)	Mavros 18', 86', 88'; Ardizoglou 40'		Dimopoulos 56'	Stadium: AEK Stadium; Attendance: 34,038; Referee: Makis Germanakos (Athens)

10 April 1983 25	AEL	4–1	AEK Athens	Trikala
16:30 EEST (UTC+3)	Valaoras 5'; Voutiritsas (yellow card) 13'; Maloumidis 46' (pen.); Parafestas (yellow card) 56'; Ziogas 67'; Kmiecik 69'		Radonjić (yellow card) 53'; Nikoloudis (yellow card) 56'; Vlachos 73'	Stadium: Trikala Municipal Stadium; Attendance: 18,000; Referee: Michalis Matsoukas (Euboea)
Note: AEL had a punishment with a match away from home due to incidents at the league match against Iraklis.

17 April 1983 26	Makedonikos	1–0	AEK Athens	Thessaloniki
16:30 EEST (UTC+3)	Fanaras (yellow card); Karamichalos 40'			Stadium: Makedonikos Stadium; Attendance: 5,351; Referee: Kostas Dimitriadis (Piraeus)

1 May 1983 27	AEK Athens	1–3	PAOK	Corinth
16:30 EEST (UTC+3)	Pellios 32' (o.g.); Paraprastanitis (yellow card) 56'		Kostikos (yellow card) 41'; Vasilakos 59', 89'; Koudas 80'	Stadium: Korinthos Stadium; Attendance: 6,704; Referee: Kostas Dimitriadis (Piraeus)
Note: Match held at Corinth due to AEK was punished with a match away from home.

11 May 1983 28	Aris	1–1	AEK Athens	Thessaloniki
16:30 EET (UTC+2)	Chatziantoniou 34'		Radonjić (yellow card); Kottis 43'	Stadium: Aris Stadium; Attendance: 11,368; Referee: Giorgos Koukoulakis (Heraklion)

22 May 1983 29	AEK Athens	3–1	Doxa Drama	Nea Filadelfeia
17:30 EEST (UTC+3)	Michailidis 11' (o.g.); Ballis 30'; Mavros 76'		Yfantidis (yellow card) 11'; Banasas 62'	Stadium: AEK Stadium; Attendance: 6,492; Referee: Vangelis Giannakoudakis (Piraeus)

29 May 1983 30	OFI	4–0	AEK Athens	Heraklion
17:30 EEST (UTC+3)	Vlastos 1'; Tsirimokos 12', 75', (yellow card) 86'; Kirisits 68'		Radonjić (yellow card) 36'	Stadium: Theodoros Vardinogiannis Stadium; Attendance: 4,516; Referee: Panagiotis Koutris (Thessaloniki)

5 June 1983 31	AEK Athens	2–0	Iraklis	Nea Filadelfeia
17:30 EEST (UTC+3)	Zifkas 70' (o.g.); Vlachos 76'		Hatzipanagis (penalty missed) 78'	Stadium: AEK Stadium; Attendance: 14,278; Referee: Vangelis Giannakoudakis (Piraeus)

12 June 1983 32	Panachaiki	0–0	AEK Athens	Patras
17:30 EEST (UTC+3)			Manolas (yellow card) 88' (yellow-red card) 89'	Stadium: Panachaiki Stadium; Attendance: 5,991; Referee: Kyriakos Kontogiannidis (Thrace)

19 June 1983 33	AEK Athens	3–1	Apollon Athens	Nea Filadelfeia
17:30 EEST (UTC+3)	Vlachos 7'; Kottis 37'; Prokovas 59' (o.g.)		Svoronos (yellow card) 49'; Chatzis (yellow card) 65'; Dokken 89'	Stadium: AEK Stadium; Attendance: 8,733; Referee: Meletis Voutsaras (Athens)

26 June 1983 34	AEK Athens	4–2	PAS Giannina	Nea Filadelfeia
17:30 EEST (UTC+3)	Ardizoglou 2'; Dintsikos 45', 85'; Mavros 56' (pen.)		Papazoglou 10' (pen.); Papachristou 46'	Stadium: AEK Stadium; Attendance: 4,831; Referee: Vasilis Messalas (Patras)

=== Greek Cup ===
==== Matches ====
15 December 1982 First round	Kilkisiakos	1–2	AEK Athens	Kilkis
14:15 EET (UTC+2)	Panagiotidis 6'; Tsachouridis (penalty missed) 51'	Report	Ardizoglou 11'; Karagiozopoulos 28'	Stadium: Municipal Stadium of Kilkis; Referee: Vangelis Giannakoudakis (Piraeus)

16 February 1983 Round of 32	AEK Athens	4–2	Panserraikos	Nea Filadelfeia
15:00 EET (UTC+2)	Nikoloudis 10', 61'; Dintsikos 24'; Ardizoglou 57'		Georgiadis 80'; Savvidis 89'	Stadium: AEK Stadium; Attendance: 5,216; Referee: Anastasiadis (Piraeus)
Note: Kostas Nestoridis led the team from the bench as an assistant to newcomer manager Helmut Senekowitsch, who watched the game from the stands.

===== Round of 16 =====
9 March 1983 First leg	AEK Athens	3–1	Irodotos	Nea Filadelfeia
15:30 EET (UTC+2)	Mavros 23', 56' (pen.); Ballis 26'; Nikoloudis (yellow card) 32'	Report	Fanioudakis (yellow card) 33'; Patemtzis 69', (yellow card) 79'	Stadium: AEK Stadium; Attendance: 2,098; Referee: Kosmas Loukidis (Imathia)

20 April 1983 Second leg	Irodotos	0–6 (1–9 agg.)	AEK Athens	Heraklion
16:45 EEST (UTC+3)			Ardizoglou 11'; Mavros 31', 55', 56', 64', 88'	Stadium: Municipal Nea Alikarnassos Stadium; Referee: Theoklis Kontzalis (Thessaloniki)
Note: First match in which Thomas Mavros scored five goals for AEK.

===== Quarter-finals =====
18 May 1983 First leg	AEK Athens	2–1	Olympiacos	Nea Filadelfeia
17:30 EEST (UTC+3)	Karagiozopoulos (yellow card); Vlachos (yellow card); Arvanitis (yellow card) 35'; Mavros 52', 62', (yellow card)	Report	Xanthopoulos (yellow card); Albertsen (yellow card); Anastopoulos 4'; Persias (yellow card) 9'; Papadopoulos (yellow card) 73'	Stadium: AEK Stadium; Attendance: 28,000; Referee: Panagiotis Spyropoulos (Thessaloniki)

4 April 1984 Second leg	Olympiacos	0–1 (1–3 agg.)	AEK Athens	Piraeus
16:30 EEST (UTC+3)	Michos (yellow card) 10'	Report	Stylianopoulos (yellow card) 64'; Mavros 78'	Stadium: Karaiskakis Stadium; Attendance: 35,313; Referee: Rigas Angelakis (Macedonia)

===== Semi-finals =====
15 June 1983 First leg	Iraklis	3–1	AEK Athens	Thessaloniki
17:30 EEST (UTC+3)	Papadopoulos 7', 32'; Kofidis (yellow card) 34'; Adamou 48'	Report	Georgamlis (yellow card) 84'; Kottis 90'	Stadium: Kaftanzoglio Stadium; Attendance: 28,442; Referee: Dimitris Koutoulas (Serres)

22 June 1983 Second leg	AEK Athens	2–0 (3(a)–3 agg.)	Iraklis	Nea Filadelfeia
17:00 EEST (UTC+3)	Galatidis 11' (o.g.); Mavros 20'	Report		Stadium: AEK Stadium; Attendance: 28,294; Referee: Nikos Kapetanakis (Piraeus)

===== Final =====
29 June 1983 Final	AEK Athens	2–0	PAOK	Marousi
21:00 EEST (UTC+3)	Mavros 27'; Georgamlis (yellow card) 30'; Ballis (yellow card) 78'; Vlachos 80'	Report	Psaras (yellow card) 32'	Stadium: Olympic Stadium; Attendance: 72,240; Referee: Antonis Vassaras (Thessaloniki)
Note: The match was marked by incidents, caused by PAOK fans throughout the match, causing a lot of damages on and off the stadium. The director of the stadium, Vangelis Savramis, tried unsuccessfully to cancel the match, while at the board was written that PAOK is charged with ₯100,000,000. The General Secretary of Sports, Kimonas Koulouris, asked for the matches income to be blocked in order to cover the damages, which reached ₯5,000,000.

=== UEFA Cup ===
==== First round ====
28 September 1982 First leg	AEK Athens (Greece)	0–1	(West Germany) Köln	Athens, Greece
21:00 EEST (UTC+3)	Georgamlis (yellow card) 4'	Report	Littbarski (yellow card) 13'; Allofs 59'	Stadium: AEK Stadium; Attendance: 12,461; Referee: Alexis Ponnet (Belgium)
Note: Originally, the match that was carried out at 14 September and was interrupted because of damage in the electrification of AEK Stadium, which resulted in blackout at the 88th minute, while the score was 3–3. UEFA decided the repetition of match from the start.

6 October 1982 Second leg	Köln (West Germany)	5–0 (6–0 agg.)	(Greece) AEK Athens	Cologne, West Germany
21:00 EEST (UTC+3)	Fischer 8', 25'; Šljivo 15', 61'; Engels 21' (pen.)	Report	Mavros (penalty missed) 38'	Stadium: Müngersdorfer Stadion; Attendance: 19,000; Referee: José García Carrión (Spain)

== Statistics ==
=== Squad statistics ===
As of 29 June 1983

No.	Pos	Player	Alpha Ethniki		Greek Cup		UEFA Cup		Total	
No.	Pos	Player	Apps	Goals	Apps	Goals	Apps	Goals	Apps	Goals
Goalkeepers
—	GK	(Greece) Lakis Stergioudas	0	0	1	0	0	0	1	0
—	GK	(Greece) Christos Arvanitis	33	0	8	0	2	0	43	0
—	GK	(Greece) Spyros Ikonomopoulos	1	0	0	0	0	0	1	0
—	GK	(Greece) Fanis Kofinas	0	0	0	0	0	0	0	0
Defenders
—	DF	(Greece) Michalis Tzirakis	16	0	4	0	1	0	21	0
—	DF	(Greece) Petros Ravousis	8	0	1	0	2	0	11	0
—	DF	(Greece) Vangelis Paraprastanitis	30	1	9	0	0	0	39	1
—	DF	(Greece) Stavros Letsas	15	1	4	0	1	0	20	1
—	DF	(Greece) Panagiotis Stylianopoulos	18	0	2	0	2	0	22	0
—	DF	(Greece) Takis Karagiozopoulos	29	1	7	1	2	0	38	2
—	DF	(Greece) Stelios Manolas	29	1	8	0	1	0	38	1
—	DF	(Greece) Lysandros Georgamlis	28	0	9	0	2	0	39	0
Midfielders
—	MF	(Greece) Christos Ardizoglou	30	5	8	3	2	0	40	8
—	MF	(People's Republic of Bulgaria) Angel Kolev	8	0	4	0	0	0	12	0
—	MF	(Greece) Spyros Thodis	1	0	1	0	0	0	2	0
—	MF	(Greece) Dinos Ballis	19	1	8	1	0	0	27	2
—	MF	(Greece) Giorgos Vlantis	5	0	1	0	0	0	6	0
—	MF	(Greece) Vangelis Vlachos	32	8	8	1	2	0	42	9
Forwards
—	FW	(Socialist Federal Republic of Yugoslavia) Mojaš Radonjić	24	4	6	0	2	0	32	4
—	FW	(Greece) Thomas Mavros	32	19	7	12	2	0	41	31
—	FW	(Greece) Manolis Kottis	7	2	5	1	0	0	12	3
—	FW	(Greece) Christos Tatidis	1	0	0	0	0	0	1	0
—	FW	(Greece) Giannis Dintsikos	33	3	7	1	2	0	42	4
—	FW	(Greece) Giorgos Chatziioannidis	8	0	3	0	0	0	11	0
—	FW	(Greece) Panagiotis Angelidis	0	0	0	0	0	0	0	0
Left during Winter Transfer Window
—	MF	(Greece) Takis Nikoloudis	29	1	6	2	0	0	35	3
—	MF	(Greece) Petros Karavitis	0	0	0	0	0	0	0	0

=== Goalscorers ===
As of 29 June 1983
The list is sorted by competition order when total goals are equal, then by position and then alphabetically by surname.

Rank	Pos.	Player	Alpha Ethniki	Greek Cup	UEFA Cup	Total
1	FW	(Greece) Thomas Mavros	19	12	0	31
2	MF	(Greece) Vangelis Vlachos	8	1	0	9
3	MF	(Greece) Christos Ardizoglou	5	3	0	8
4	FW	(Socialist Federal Republic of Yugoslavia) Mojaš Radonjić	4	0	0	4
4	FW	(Greece) Giannis Dintsikos	3	1	0	4
6	FW	(Greece) Manolis Kottis	2	1	0	3
6	MF	(Greece) Takis Nikoloudis	1	2	0	3
8	DF	(Greece) Takis Karagiozopoulos	1	1	0	2
8	MF	(Greece) Dinos Ballis	1	1	0	2
10	DF	(Greece) Stelios Manolas	1	0	0	1
10	DF	(Greece) Stavros Letsas	1	0	0	1
10	DF	(Greece) Vangelis Paraprastanitis	1	0	0	1
Own goals			5	1	0	6
Totals			52	23	0	75

=== Hat-tricks ===
Numbers in superscript represent the goals that the player scored.

Player	Against	Result	Date	Competition	Source
(Greece) Thomas Mavros	(Greece) Rodos	4–0 (H)	26 September 1982	Alpha Ethniki	
(Greece) Thomas Mavros	(Greece) Panathinaikos	4–1 (H)	3 April 1983	Alpha Ethniki	
(Greece) Thomas Mavros^{5}	(Greece) Irodotos	6–0 (A)	20 April 1983	Greek Cup	

=== Clean sheets ===
As of 29 June 1983
The list is sorted by competition order when total clean sheets are equal and then alphabetically by surname. Clean sheets in games where both goalkeepers participated are awarded to the goalkeeper who started the game. Goalkeepers with no appearances are not included.

Rank	Player	Alpha Ethniki	Greek Cup	UEFA Cup	Total
1	(Greece) Christos Arvanitis	12	4	0	16
2	(Greece) Spyros Ikonomopoulos	0	0	0	0
3	(Greece) Lakis Stergioudas	0	0	0	0
Totals		12	4	0	16

=== Disciplinary record ===
As of 29 June 1983

N	P	Nat.	Name	Alpha Ethniki			Greek Cup			UEFA Cup			Total			Notes
N	P	Nat.	Name	Yellow card	Second yellow card	Red card	Yellow card	Second yellow card	Red card	Yellow card	Second yellow card	Red card	Yellow card	Second yellow card	Red card	Notes
Goalkeepers
—	GK	(Greece)	Lakis Stergioudas													
—	GK	(Greece)	Christos Arvanitis				1						1			
—	GK	(Greece)	Spyros Ikonomopoulos													
—	GK	(Greece)	Fanis Kofinas													
Defenders
—	DF	(Greece)	Michalis Tzirakis	1									1			
—	DF	(Greece)	Petros Ravousis													
—	DF	(Greece)	Vangelis Paraprastanitis	1									1			
—	DF	(Greece)	Stavros Letsas	1									1			
—	DF	(Greece)	Panagiotis Stylianopoulos	1			1						2			
—	DF	(Greece)	Takis Karagiozopoulos				1						1			
—	DF	(Greece)	Stelios Manolas	3	1								3	1		
—	DF	(Greece)	Lysandros Georgamlis				2			1			3			
Midfielders
—	MF	(Greece)	Christos Ardizoglou	1									1			
—	MF	(People's Republic of Bulgaria)	Angel Kolev													
—	MF	(Greece)	Spyros Thodis													
—	MF	(Greece)	Dinos Ballis	1			1						2			
—	MF	(Greece)	Giorgos Vlantis													
—	MF	(Greece)	Vangelis Vlachos	2			1						3			
Forwards
—	FW	(Socialist Federal Republic of Yugoslavia)	Mojaš Radonjić	8									8			
—	FW	(Greece)	Thomas Mavros	1			1						2			
—	FW	(Greece)	Manolis Kottis													
—	FW	(Greece)	Christos Tatidis													
—	FW	(Greece)	Giannis Dintsikos	2									2			
—	FW	(Greece)	Giorgos Chatziioannidis													
—	FW	(Greece)	Panagiotis Angelidis													
Left during Winter Transfer Window
—	MF	(Greece)	Takis Nikoloudis	2			1						3			
—	MF	(Greece)	Petros Karavitis													

=== Starting 11 ===
This section presents the most frequently used formation along with the players with the most starts across all competitions.

N.	Formation	Matchday(s)
45	4–3–3	1–34

Nat.	Player	Pos.
(Greece)	Christos Arvanitis	GK
(Greece)	Stelios Manolas	RCB
(Greece)	Takis Karagiozopoulos	LCB
(Greece)	Lysandros Georgamlis	RB
(Greece)	Vangelis Paraprastanitis	LB
(Greece)	Takis Nikoloudis	DM
(Greece)	Christos Ardizoglou	RCM
(Greece)	Vangelis Vlachos (C)	LCM
(Greece)	Giannis Dintsikos	RW
(Greece)	Thomas Mavros	LW
(Socialist Federal Republic of Yugoslavia)	Mojaš Radonjić	CF

Last updated: 1983-06-29

== Awards ==
Player	Pos.	Award	Source
(Greece) Thomas Mavros	FW	Greek Cup Top Scorer	
