= 1983 Greek Football Cup final =

1983 Greek Cup final
- Event: 1982–83 Greek Football Cup
AEK Athens	PAOK
2	0
- Date: 29 June 1983
- Venue: Olympic Stadium, Marousi, Athens
- Referee: Antonis Vassaras (Thessaloniki)
- Attendance: 72,240

The 1983 Greek Cup final was the 39th final of the Greek Cup. The match took place on 29 June 1983 at the Olympic Stadium. The contesting teams were AEK Athens and PAOK. It was AEK Athens' twelfth Greek Cup final in their 59 years of existence and PAOK's twelfth Greek Cup final in their 57-year history. The match was marked by terrible incidents, caused by PAOK fans before, during and after the match causing a lot of damage on and off the stadium. The director of the stadium, Vangelis Savramis, tried to cancel the match, something that was not possible and at the board was written that PAOK is charged with ₯100,000,000. The General Secretary of Sports, Kimonas Koulouris asked for the income to be blocked in order to cover the damages, which reached ₯5,000,000, while he stated that the stadium would never be given for any Greek club.

== Venue ==
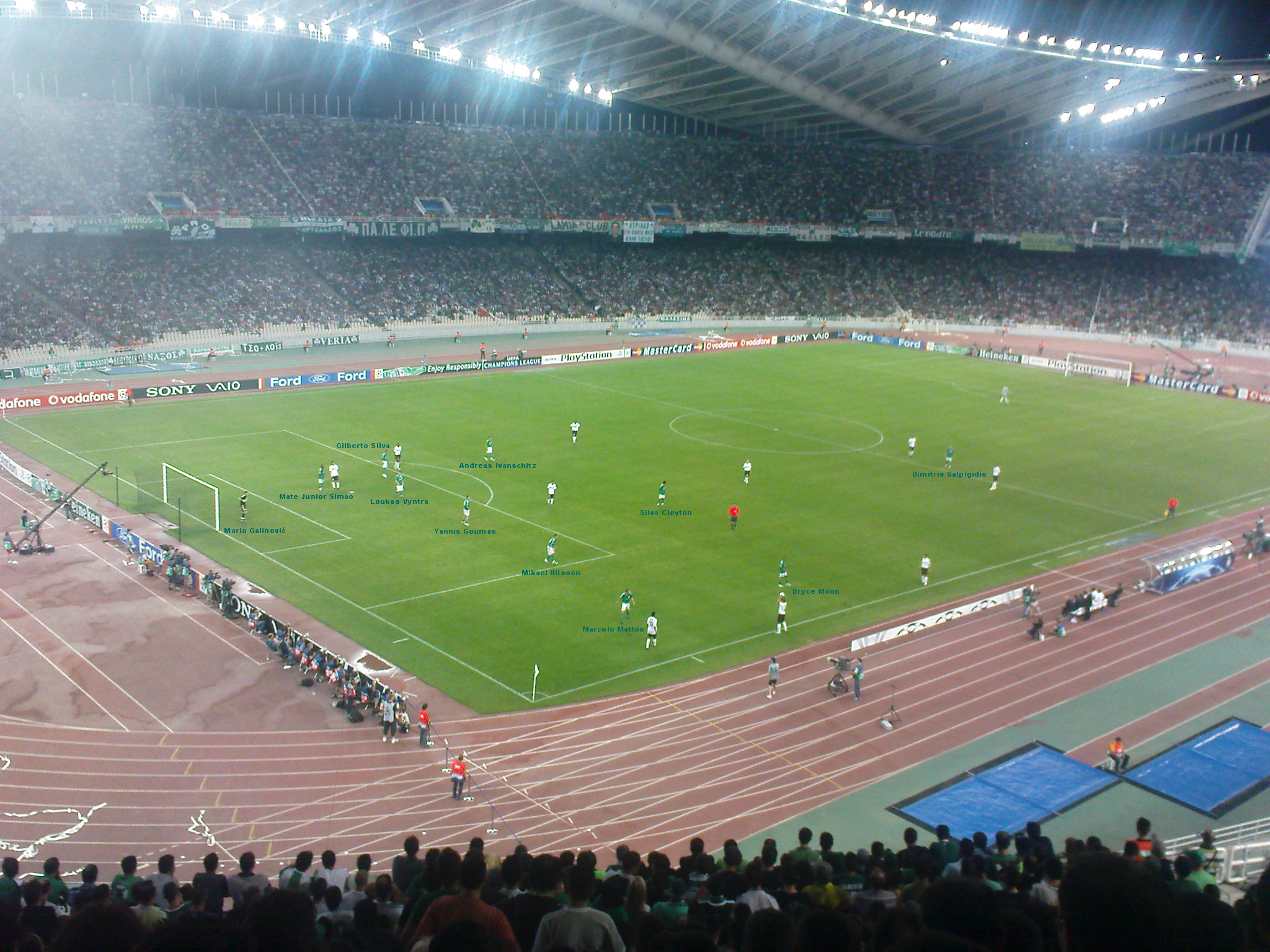
Athens Olympic Stadium.

This was the first Greek Cup final held at the Athens Olympic Stadium.

The Athens Olympic Stadium was built in 1982. The stadium is used as a venue for Greece. Its current capacity is 80,000 and hosted a European Cup final in 1983.

== Background ==
AEK Athens had reached the Greek Cup final eleven times, winning six of them. The last time that they had won the Cup was in 1978 (2–0 against PAOK). The last time that had played in a final was in 1979, where they had lost to Panionios by 3–1.

PAOK had reached the Greek Cup final eleven times, winning two of them. The last time that they had won the Cup was in 1974 (4–3 on penalties, which came after a 2–2 draw at the end of the extra time against Olympiacos). The last time that had played in a final was in 1981, where they had lost to Olympiacos by 3–1.

The two teams had met each other in a Cup final two times in the 1939 and 1978 finals.

== Route to the final ==
AEK Athens				Round	PAOK			
Opponent	Agg.	1st leg	2nd leg		Opponent	Agg.	1st leg	2nd leg
Kilkisiakos	2–1 (A)			First round	Anagennisi Karditsa	7–0 (H)		
Bye				Additional round	Almopos Aridea	3–0 (A)		
Panserraikos	4–2 (H)			Round of 32	Vyzas Megara	3–1 (A)		
Irodotos	9–1	3–1 (H)	6–0 (A)	Round of 16	Ethnikos Alexandroupoli	6–0	2–0 (A)	4–0 (H)
Olympiacos	3–1	2–1 (H)	1–0 (A)	Quarter-finals	Panargiakos	3–0	1–0 (A)	2–0 (w/o) (H)
Iraklis	3–3 (a)	1–3 (A)	2–0 (H)	Semi-finals	Rodos	3–0	2–0 (H)	1–0 (A)

== Match ==
=== Details ===
29 June 1983
21:00 EEST

AEK Athens	2–0	PAOK
Mavros 27'; Vlachos 80'	Report

Olympic Stadium, Marousi
Attendance: 72,240
Referee: Antonis Vassaras (Thessaloniki)

AEK Athens	PAOK

GK	1	(Greece) Christos Arvanitis
RB	2	(Greece) Lysandros Georgamlis	(yellow card) 30'
CB	5	(Greece) Takis Karagiozopoulos		(substituted off) 65'
CB	4	(Greece) Stelios Manolas
LB	3	(Greece) Vangelis Paraprastanitis
DM	7	(Greece) Dinos Ballis	(yellow card) 78'
CM	6	(Greece) Christos Ardizoglou
CM	10	(Greece) Vangelis Vlachos (c)
RW	9	(Greece) Manolis Kottis
LW	8	(Greece) Giannis Dintsikos		(substituted off) 78'
CF	11	(Greece) Thomas Mavros
Substitutes:
GK	15	(Greece) Lakis Stergioudas
DF	16	(Greece) Michalis Tzirakis		(substituted on) 65'
DF		(Greece) Stavros Letsas
FW	14	(Socialist Federal Republic of Yugoslavia) Mojaš Radonjić		(substituted on) 78'
Manager:
(Austria) Helmut Senekowitsch

GK	1	(Socialist Federal Republic of Yugoslavia) Mladen Furtula
RB	2	(Greece) Georgios Skartados
CB	3	(Greece) Nikos Alavantas
CB	5	(Greece) Thomas Singas
LB	4	(Greece) Giannis Psarras	(yellow card) 32'
DM	6	(Greece) Ioannis Damanakis		(substituted off) 75'
CM	7	(Germany) Holger Trimhold
CM	10	(Greece) Giorgos Koudas (c)
RW	8	(Brazil) Neto Guerino
LW	11	(Greece) Georgios Kostikos
CF	9	(Greece) Christos Dimopoulos
Substitutes:
MF	13	(Greece) Stathis Triantafyllidis		(substituted on) 75'
Manager:
(Germany) Heinz Höher

Assistant referees:
Makis Germanakos (Athens)
Giorgos Koukoulakis (Heraklion)

Match rules

- 90 minutes
- 30 minutes of extra time if necessary
- Penalty shootout if scores still level
- Five named substitutes
- Maximum of two substitutions

== See also ==
- 1982–83 Greek Football Cup
