= Tsirimokos =

Tsirimokos is a surname. Notable people with the surname include:

- Ilias Tsirimokos, Greek politician
- Thalis Tsirimokos (1954–2022), Greek footballer
