= Lysandros Georgamlis =

Greek footballer and manager (born 1962)

Personal information
- Date of birth: 25 February 1962 (age 64)
- Place of birth: Athens, Greece
- Height: 1.82 m (6 ft 0 in)
- Positions: Defender; defensive midfielder

Youth career
- 1971–1980: AEK Athens

Senior career*
Years	Team	Apps	(Gls)
1980–1985	AEK Athens	116	(4)
1985–1992	Panathinaikos	159	(6)
1992–1994	OFI	55	(11)
1994–1995	Kalamata		
1995–1996	Iraklis	28	(1)
1996–1999	Ethnikos Piraeus	48	(5)
1999	Athinaikos		
Total		406	(27)

International career
–1981	Greece U19		
1987–1988	Greece	6	(0)

Managerial career
- 1998: Ethnikos Piraeus (player-manager)
- 1998–2003: Attalos
- 2003–2005: Thrasyvoulos
- 2006: Asteras Tripolis
- 2006: Ethnikos Piraeus
- 2007: Panetolikos
- 2007–2008: Ilisiakos
- 2008: Fostiras
- 2008–2010: AEK Athens (assistant)
- 2010–2011: Omonia (assistant)
- 2011–2012: Thrasyvoulos
- 2012: Atromitos (assistant)
- 2013: Kallithea
- * Club domestic league appearances and goals

Lysandros Georgamlis (Greek: Λύσσανδρος Γεωργαμλής; born 25 February 1962) is a Greek former international football player who played as a defender and a manager.

== Club career ==
Georgamlis started his football career in 1971 at the youth team of AEK Athens where was a member of a generation of footballers such as Stelios Manolas and Vangelis Vlachos. On 16 December 1980 he signed a professional contract with the club and later became a member of the team's squad. He played in the positions of right back, sweeper and defensive midfielder, he had blocking and organizing abilities in his game and a very strong shot. On 29 June 1983 he played a match in the final against PAOK, where AEK won by 2–0 and lifted the trophy.

On 22 November 1985, his contract expired and as he did not get along with the administration of Zafiropoulos he signed for Panathinaikos. During his spell at the "greens" he won three Championships, four Cups, one Greek Super Cup at a time when the team also had successful runs in European Competitions. In 1992, he joined OFI, offering his service to the club for two seasons. After a short stay at Kalamata he joined Iraklis in 1995 and a year later Ethnikos Piraeus. In February 1999 he signed to Athinaikos and with the end of the season in the summer of the same year, he ended his football career.

== International career ==
Georgamlis also competed 6 times with Greece from 1987 to 1988. He made his debut on 16 December 1987 in the home match in Rhodes against Netherlands, when under the instructions of Miltos Papapostolou he played the whole match. His last appearance came almost ten months later, on 19 October 1988, in the home match against Denmark, where he came on as a substitute replacing Tasos Mitropoulos.

== Managerial career ==
After the end of his football career, Georgamlis attended all HFF coaching courses available and got his professional coach diploma, including the UEFA Pro. His coaching career started from Attalos Nea Filadelfeia in 1999. In 2003, he joined Thrasyvoulos, where he stayed for three years helping the club to be promoted from the 3rd to the 2nd Division. In the season 1996–97 he won the 3rd Division Championship with Asteras Tripolis and then joined Panetolikos, Ethnikos Piraeus, Ilisiakos and Fostiras. In November 2008, Georgamlis became the assistant coach of AEK Athens next to Dušan Bajević. In June 2012, Georgamlis, again next to Bajević, became the assistant coach of Atromitos.

== Honours ==
AEK Athens

- Greek Cup: 1982–83

Panathinaikos

- Alpha Ethniki: 1985–86, 1989–90, 1990–91
- Greek Cup: 1985–86, 1987–88, 1988–89, 1990–91
- Greek Super Cup: 1988
