= 1982–83 Alpha Ethniki =

47th season of top-tier football league in Greece

Alpha Ethniki
- Season: 1982–83
- Champions: Olympiacos; 24th Greek title
- Relegated: Makedonikos; Panachaiki; Rodos; Kastoria
- European Cup: Olympiacos
- UEFA Cup: AEL; PAOK
- Cup Winners' Cup: AEK Athens
- Matches: 306
- Goals: 729 (2.38 per match)
- Top goalscorer: Nikos Anastopoulos (29 goals)

The 1982–83 Alpha Ethniki was the 47th season of the highest football league of Greece. The season began on 19 September 1982 and ended on 26 June 1983. Olympiacos won their fourth consecutive and 24th Greek title.

The point system was: Win: 2 points - Draw: 1 point.

== Teams ==
Promoted from 1981–82 Beta Ethniki	Relegated from 1981–82 Alpha Ethniki
Panachaiki; Makedonikos	Kavala; Korinthos

Location of teams in 1982–83 Alpha Ethniki

== League table ==
Pos	Team	Pld	W	D	L	GF	GA	GD	Pts	Qualification or relegation
1	Olympiacos (C)	34	20	10	4	50	22	+28	50	Qualification for European Cup first round
2	AEL	34	18	9	7	54	27	+27	45	Qualification for UEFA Cup first round
3	AEK Athens	34	19	7	8	54	39	+15	45	Qualification for Cup Winners' Cup first round
4	PAOK	34	18	6	10	49	28	+21	42	Qualification for UEFA Cup first round
5	Aris	34	15	11	8	35	23	+12	41	
6	Panathinaikos	34	14	9	11	50	42	+8	37	
7	OFI	34	14	9	11	53	48	+5	37	
8	Iraklis	34	12	10	12	52	39	+13	34	
9	PAS Giannina	34	10	13	11	35	34	+1	33	
10	Apollon Athens	34	11	9	14	40	36	+4	31	
11	Ethnikos Piraeus	34	10	11	13	34	38	−4	31	
12	Doxa Drama	34	12	7	15	43	56	−13	31	
13	Panserraikos	34	9	12	13	28	37	−9	30	
14	Panionios	34	11	7	16	31	44	−13	29 (Note: Relegation play-out: Panionios–Makedonikos 3–2.)	
15	Makedonikos (R)	34	11	7	16	30	50	−20	29	Relegation to Beta Ethniki
16	Panachaiki (R)	34	11	4	19	35	50	−15	26	Relegation to Beta Ethniki
17	Rodos (R)	34	7	7	20	25	58	−33	21	Relegation to Beta Ethniki
18	Kastoria (R)	34	7	6	21	31	58	−27	20	Relegation to Beta Ethniki

Source: RSSSF
Rules for classification: 1st points; 2nd decision match; 3rd head-to-head goal difference.
(C) Champions; (R) Relegated

== Results ==
Home \ Away	AEK	AEL	APA	ARIS	DOX	ETH	IRA	KAS	MAK	OFI	OLY	PNC	PAO	PAN	PNS	PAOK	PAS	ROD
AEK Athens		3–0	3–1	2–1	3–1	1–0	2–0	2–0	3–1	2–3	1–1	1–0	4–1	1–0	2–0	1–3	4–2	4–0
AEL	4–1		2–0	1–1	0–0	5–1	0–0	3–0	3–1	1–1	2–0	1–1	1–1	4–0	3–0	1–0	1–0	2–0
Apollon Athens	0–1	1–1		1–1	2–0	3–1	1–0	3–1	4–0	4–1	1–2	3–0	0–1	1–1	0–1	2–1	1–0	3–0
Aris	1–1	2–1	1–0		2–0	1–0	1–0	4–0	1–0	2–1	3–2	2–1	0–0	1–0	4–2	0–0	0–0	0–1
Doxa Drama	0–0	2–0	2–1	2–1		1–1	2–2	1–0	4–0	1–1	1–2	3–2	2–1	3–1	0–0	3–1	1–0	1–0
Ethnikos Piraeus	2–0	0–1	1–1	0–0	2–3		1–0	0–0	3–0	3–2	1–3	2–0	1–1	2–0	1–0	1–2	0–0	2–0
Iraklis	2–2	0–1	4–1	0–1	3–0	2–1		5–1	3–0	4–1	2–1	2–0	4–1	2–0	2–0	0–0	0–0	1–1
Kastoria	2–3	0–1	1–3	0–0	6–2	1–1	5–3		0–1	0–1	0–0	2–0	1–0	3–1	2–0	0–1	1–2	2–0
Makedonikos	1–0	0–1	1–0	1–0	1–1	2–0	1–0	3–0		0–1	0–0	3–0	3–0	0–0	2–2	0–0	1–0	4–0
OFI	4–0	1–4	0–0	1–0	1–0	1–1	1–0	4–2	6–0		0–0	2–0	1–1	1–1	2–0	2–1	3–1	3–1
Olympiacos	1–1	0–1	1–0	0–0	3–1	3–1	2–0	3–0	1–1	3–1		2–1	2–1	1–0	2–0	2–0	2–0	3–1
Panachaiki	0–0	1–0	0–0	1–0	3–2	1–2	3–1	1–1	3–1	2–1	0–1		0–1	5–0	0–1	1–0	3–1	3–2
Panathinaikos	1–2	2–1	3–1	1–2	5–1	2–1	0–0	3–0	3–0	2–2	0–1	4–1		1–3	2–1	2–0	2–2	3–0
Panionios	0–1	1–3	1–0	2–1	2–1	0–1	2–1	1–0	3–1	1–0	0–2	3–0	1–1		0–0	1–0	1–1	2–0
Panserraikos	1–0	1–1	0–0	2–0	2–0	0–0	2–2	0–0	0–0	1–1	0–0	3–1	1–2	3–2		0–0	1–0	4–0
PAOK	5–0	3–2	2–0	0–2	2–0	2–1	1–3	3–0	3–0	4–2	1–1	1–0	2–0	1–0	2–0		4–1	2–0
PAS Giannina	1–1	1–0	1–1	0–0	2–0	0–0	3–3	2–0	4–1	3–0	1–1	2–0	0–0	1–0	2–0	0–0		2–1
Rodos	0–2 (Note: Rodos-AEK Athens 1–2 at 86th minute, awarded 0–2 because Rodos were left with 6 players.)	2–2	1–1	0–0	4–2	0–0	1–1	1–0	1–0	3–1	0–2	0–1	1–2	1–1	2–0	0–2	1–0	

Source: RSSSF
Legend: Blue = home team win; Yellow = draw; Red = away team win.

== Top scorers ==
Rank	Player	Club	Goals
1	(Greece) Nikos Anastopoulos	Olympiacos	29
2	(Greece) Thomas Mavros	AEK Athens	19
3	(Greece) Thalis Tsirimokos	OFI	17
4	(Greece) Thanasis Dimopoulos	Panathinaikos	15
5	(Greece) Kostas Maloumidis	AEL	15
6	(Bulgaria) Todor Barzov	Doxa Drama	13
7	(Socialist Federal Republic of Yugoslavia) Slobodan Vučeković	Doxa Drama	12
7	(Greece) Thomas Liolios	Kastoria	12
7	(Greece) Kostas Mavridis	Panathinaikos	12
10	(Greece) Daniil Papadopoulos	Iraklis	11
10	(Greece) Christos Dimopoulos	PAOK	11
10	(Greece) Giorgos Karamichalos	Makedonikos	11

== Attendances ==
Olympiacos drew the highest average home attendance in the 1982–83 Alpha Ethniki.

#	Team	Average attendance
1	Olympiacos	23,508
2	Panathinaikos	14,885
3	AEK Athens	12,954
4	PAOK	9,588
5	AEL	9,447
6	Aris	8,531
7	Iraklis	8,298
8	Panionios	6,550
9	Ethnikos Piraeus	6,446
10	PAS Giannina	6,052
11	Panachaiki	5,016
12	Apollon Athens	4,504
13	OFI	4,360
14	Doxa Drama	4,168
15	Panserraikos	4,158
16	Makedonikos	4,123
17	Rodos	3,501
18	Kastoria	2,166
