= Stavros Letsas =

Greek footballer

Personal information
- Full name: Stavros Letsas
- Date of birth: 6 March 1957 (age 69)
- Place of birth: Agioi Anargyroi, Athens Greece
- Positions: Defender; right midfielder

Senior career*
Years	Team	Apps	(Gls)
1975–1979	Agioi Anargyroi		
1979–1985	AEK Athens	29	(2)
1980–1981	→ Panelefsiniakos (loan)		
1985	Egaleo		
- * Club domestic league appearances and goals

Stavros Letsas (Greek: Σταύρος Λέτσας; born 6 March 1957) is a Greek former professional footballer who played as defender.

== Club career ==
Letsas started playing football at the amateur club of Agioi Anargyroi. In 1978, when he was the age of 21, the management of the club negotiated his transfer to Olympiacos, something he wanted to avoid since he was a supporter of AEK Athens and preferred to wear the yellow-black jersey. A friendly match of Agioi Anargyroi against AEK at Nea Filadelfeia became the reason for his transfer to his dream club becoming reality. His manager and former footballer of AEK, Kostas Papageorgiou played a catalytic role in his transfer to the club.

On 7 August 1979 Letsas signed for the yellow-blacks. At the time it was far from easy to establish himself in the main squad, due to the star roster of the club. Thus, he spent his first season without making any official appearances, playing for the reserve team and in the following season he was loaned to Panelefsiniakos.

After his loan was over in the summer of 1981, Letsas returned to AEK and became an active member within the squad. His first appearance was on 21 March 1982 in the home victory over Apollon Athens with 2–1, where he came on as a substitute in the 74th minute. He competed for the first time in the starting eleven on 11 April 1982 when he scored in the 20th minute the first of the two AEK goals in the 1–2 away victory over AEL. He initially was used as a wide midfielder and in the development of his career in AEK he played as a full-back and as a central defender.

Several factors contributed to his football career being relatively short-lived. At one hand, while he was playing at AEK, he suffered three serious injuries which led him to undertake three surgeries, respectively. That resulted in long periods of absence from the pitch, due to the time of his recovery. On the other hand, the departure of the club's owner, Loukas Barlos in 1981 and the new ownership of Andreas Zafiropoulos marked a period of many administrative reshuffles. The administrative instability played an important part in his eventual departure from the club. During his spell at AEK he won the Greek Cup in 1983. On 9 August 1985 he left AEK and signed for Egaleo, where he played for three months before taking the decision to retire from professional football at the age of 28.

== After football ==
Letsas has studied engineering, a profession he still practices, working in the Municipality of Agioi Anargyroi. After his retirement as a footballer, he immediately became involved in coaching, mainly in amateur clubs, academies and infrastructure departments. He was a member of the staff in the infrastructure departments of AEK, having the sole responsibility of training the U14-U15 team until 2016, when he undertook various positions in the club. In 2019 a series of changes in the structure of the academies occurred which led in the withdrawal of Letsas.

== Honours ==
AEK Athens

- Greek Cup: 1982–83
