= Thomas Mavros =

Greek footballer (born 1954)

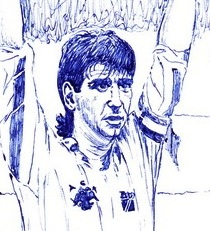
- Illustration of Thomas Mavros playing for AEK Athens.

54th president of AEK Athens
- In office 1 August 2012 – 30 September 2012
- Preceded by: Andreas Dimitrelos
- Succeeded by: Andreas Dimitrelos

Personal details
- Born: 31 May 1954 (age 72) Kallithea, Athens, Greece
- Spouse: Angeliki Agorastopoulou
- Children: Dimitris Mavros; Sotiris Mavros; Ioanna Mavros
Association football career
- Full name: Thomas Mavros
- Height: 1.72 m (5 ft 8 in)
- Position: Striker
Youth career
- 1965–1970: Panionios
Senior career*
Years	Team	Apps	(Gls)
1970–1976	Panionios	135	(35)
1976–1987	AEK Athens	278	(174)
1987–1991	Panionios	89	(51)
Total		502	(260)
International career
1972–1974	Greece U19	5	(4)
1972–1976	Greece U21	4	(1)
1972–1984	Greece	36	(11)
1979	Greece military	2	(1)
- * Club domestic league appearances and goals

Thomas Mavros (Greek: Θωμάς Μαύρος, born 31 May 1954) is a Greek former professional footballer who played as a striker.

Starting his career at Panionios, he quickly established himself in the Greek championship at the age of 16. He became one of the star players of AEK Athens and led the club to major successes during the 1970s and 1980s. Mavros is widely regarded as one of the best footballers in Greece, having scored a record 260 goals in the Greek championship and played for the Europe XI in 1981, as well as the World XI in 1984. He was nicknamed "The God" (Greek: Ο Θεός) or "Theomas" (Greek: "Θεωμάς").

In 2012 he also had a brief spell as president of AEK Athens.

== Early life ==
Mavros was born on 31 May 1954 in Kallithea, where he lived for the first four years of his life, until his family moved to Palaio Faliro. His father, Michalis, despite not being a footballer himself, was a huge fan of football. From the age of five, his father used to take him and his brother to the yard of their house every morning, from 7 to 9, teaching them the basics of football. He also took them on Sundays to the Nea Smyrni Stadium to watch Panionios. His elder brother Sotiris, soon joined the children section of Panionios. For the seven-year-old Mavros, it all began on a winter Sunday in 1961, after his father refused to go to the stadium due to bad weather. Mavros decided to go alone to Nea Smyrni to watch a match of Panionios against Pierikos. He waited outside the locker rooms and caught the attention of the team's captain, Takis Papoulidis, who urged Mavros to go out with the rest of the team for the warm-up. At the suggestion of Papoulidis, the two of them played "headers", reaching 65 without dropping the ball. Papoulidis, recognizing the talent and abilities of the young Mavros, urged him to attend every match in the uniform of Panionios and to enter the pitch with the team as their mascot. In the first match in which Mavros served as a mascot, Panionios defeated Olympiacos by 1–0 and he earned 100 drachmas for the luck he brought to the team.

== Club career ==
=== Panionios ===
At the age of 11, Mavros joined the youth academy of the club and began his intensive involvement with football. The exclusion of his brother from the club's teenage section combined with the disappointment of his family brought him to train with the youth team of Olympiacos. There, Elias Yfantis identified his potential and asked him to join the team. Panionios refused to give him his sport's card, preventing the transfer and Mavros became disillusioned and temporarily withdrew from the club's activities. The situation was resolved by the curator of the club Papidas, after a visit to his house and a promise to 14-year-old Thomas for participation in the youth team. There, he worked under Dezső Bundzsák at the beginning and later Joe Mallett who recognized and developed his potential. On 8 September 1970 he was promoted to the senior team and he became the youngest player to have played in a Greek championship match, at the age of 16. He also the youngest scorer on 17 January 1971, when he scored the only goal at the 65th minute against Pierikos in a 1–0 victory. He also became an international at a very young age whilst not playing for any of the top clubs. On 16 September 1971, he made his European debut against Atlético Madrid in the first round of the UEFA Cup. His appearance made him the then youngest player of a Greek football club to have ever played in a European competition. Initially Mavros played as a left winger and later as a striker, where he showed his scoring abilities, attracting the interest from major Greek clubs.

=== AEK Athens ===
In the summer of 1975, the president of AEK Athens, Loukas Barlos was interested in signing Mavros, but the board of Panionios rejected all offers, refusing to sell their best player. AEK were about to relive the adventures of the transfer of Kostas Nestoridis in 1955. The desire of Mavros to play for the AEK of the time, as well as his appreciation for Barlos were enough to overcome the efforts of the president of Panionios, Tsolakakis to block the transfer. It was later revealed that, when Mavros signed his contract with Panionios, he was still a minor, thus rendering the contract invalid. Panionios still blocked the transfer, which led to a legal dispute between the two sides that lasted for an entire season. During this period, he was unable to compete in an official match for either side and thus he was limited to playing in only friendly games with AEK. On 2 July 1976 the dispute was eventually settled out-of-court and Mavros was transferred to AEK Athens for the amount of 10 million drachmas.

The resolution of the case brought satisfaction to both Barlos and Mavros who developed a "father-son" relationship. From his first season, he became an integral part of the team, helping them reach the semi-finals of the UEFA Cup. With the arrival of Dušan Bajević he formed one of the club's most prolific attacking duos. The following season, he had a starring role in AEK winning the domestic double, emerging as the top scorer of the league with 22 goals. The team of Barlos did not stop there and won a second consecutive championship in 1979, while they missed the chance to win the domestic double, losing the Cup to Panionios in the final. Mavros was again the league's top scorer making a career record of 31 goals, while his performances of that season won him a Silver Shoe, finishing 3 goals behind Kees Kist of AZ.

The era after the departure of Barlos was marked with administrative and financial instability within the club, while the signings did not meet expectations, as the team became progressively weaker. In that period of decline for the club, Mavros stayed and with his leading presence helped maintain the team's competitiveness. He was particularly popular among the supporters of AEK, partly due to his loyalty to the club during a period of decline and his scoring performances in matches against Olympiacos. He earned the nickname "The God" (Greek: Ο Θεός), while the lexicographer Faidon Konstantoudakis also coined the nickname "Theomas" (Greek: "Θεωμάς") (paraphrase of his first name to resemble the Greek word for God) and whenever he scored the whole stadium chanted "Who, who, who? Mavros the God" (Greek: "Ποιος, ποιος, ποιος; Ο Μαύρος ο Θεός").

On 22 July 1981, Mavros was called to play for Europe XI in a match against Czechoslovakia on 18 August for the 80th anniversary of the Czechoslovak Football Association. He entered the march at half-time replacing Hans Krankl in the 4–0 defeat for his team.

In 1982, he played a key role in eliminating Olympiacos in the quarter-finals of the Cup with 2 wins and his goal in the victory by 0–1 in the second leg at Karaiskakis Stadium. In the counterattack of AEK that led to the goal, Mavros got the ball at the center of the field and dribbled into the penalty area and many supporters of the red whites began leaving the stadium confident of the upcoming goal of Mavros and the consequent elimination of their team. In the final against PAOK at Olympic Stadium, his goal and another by Vangelis Vlachos led the club to win a title after 4 years. In the following season he renewed his contract with the club receiving 45 million drachmas from the then president, Lefteris Panagidis.

On 22 June 1984, Mavros was called to play for the World XI alongside his countryman Vasilis Hatzipanagis and players such as Franz Beckenbauer, Ruud Krol, Johan Neeskens, Peter Shilton, Kevin Keegan, Mario Kempes, Hugo Sánchez and Felix Magath. At Giants Stadium approximately 20,000 Greek spectators were gathered to watch World XI playing against New York Cosmos in a 3–1 win. In fact, according to Mavros, during the match, Beckenbauer told him "At last, you came.", referring to the constant interest of his club, New York Cosmos in singing the Greek footballer.

On 27 January 1985, Mavros also became one of the nine Greek players in history to have scored 5 goals in a match against Egaleo where AEK won by 5–2. At the end of the season he finished as the league’s leading scorer for the third time in his career with 27 goals. In 1987, the manager of the club, Nikos Alefantos asked the president, Andreas Zafiropoulos not to renew the contract of Mavros, as he thought the player was "too old" to play for a club of that level. This was confirmed on 11 April 1987, in the home match against Apollon Kalamarias, when at the 80th minute Alefantos substituted Mavros, being booed by the fans. Zafiropoulos agreed to the request of the manager and Mavros was released from the club and returned to his former club, Panionios. During his spell at AEK he won 2 championships and 2 Cups, including the domestic double of 1978.

=== Return to Panionios ===
Mavros proved the former manager and the administration of AEK Athens wrong in his return to Nea Smyrni. With Panionios, in 1990 he finished as top scorer in the league with 22 goals, at the age of 36, becoming the oldest player in Greece to win the award. Upon his return to Nea Filadelfeia on 28 October 1989, as an opponent of AEK, Mavros equalized the match at the 27th minute and didn't celebrate, with the crowd chanting his name as if he had just scored for AEK, showing their love and appreciation to his face, who responded by applauding them back and sending them kisses, wiping away a tear of joy. Before retiring in 1991, Mavros managed to score a total of 51 goals in 89 matches on his second spell at the club and surpassed his former teammate at AEK Athens, Mimis Papaioannou as the all-time top scorer in the Greek championship.

=== Retirement ===
On 14 November 1993, a testimonial match was organized for his retirement, where Greece faced AEK Athens at Nikos Goumas Stadium. Mavros was honored for his contribution in football by AEK, the HFF and the state. He competed one half with each side, while at the 62nd minute he was replaced by Nikos Machlas and faced the worship of the crowd. AEK won the match by 4–2 with Mavros scoring three goals, two with AEK and one with Greece.

== International career ==
Mavros represented Greece U19 from 1972 to 1974, scoring four goals in the matches for the European Championship. Two goals against Yugoslavia and one goal on 16 January 1974 against Malta. Then he played with Greece U21 and on 31 May 1972 he scored the winning goal in the semi-final of the European Championship in the 2–1 victory over Czechoslovakia.

Mavros made his debut with Greece on 16 February 1972 in a 0–5 home defeat at the hands of the Netherlands. From 1972 to 1984 he made a total of 36 international appearances, scoring 11 goals. His most notable moment was his presence in the 1980 European Championship.

== Personal life ==
Mavros is married to the former basketball player of Palaio Faliro, Angeliki Agorastopoulou and they have two sons, Dimitris and Sotiris and a daughter, Ioanna.

== After football ==
After retiring from football Mavros entered the restaurant business. Although he was repeatedly offered a position in the administrative or the managerial staff of AEK, he repeatedly refused, disagreeing with the general situation of the club. In 2007 he opened his own coffee bar in the marina of Alimos.

On 1 August 2012, Mavros became the president of AEK Athens in an effort to help the club to cope with its financial struggles. He formed a new team based on young players and hired Vangelis Vlachos as the manager and Vasilios Tsiartas as the technical director, but it was without result. He resigned on 30 September 2012, when he found out attempts to bypass his decisions with the removal of Vlachos, who he had chosen, being the triggering event.

In 2017 he published his autobiography with the title "Who, who, who? Mavros the God". His name is honoured on one of the four pillars of AEK Athens' new stadium, Agia Sophia Stadium, alongside other important figures of the club's history such as Kostas Nestoridis, Stelios Serafidis and Mimis Papaioannou.

== Career statistics ==
=== Club ===
Club	Season	League (Note: Also includes the games for the play-off matches.)			Greek Cup		Europe		Total	
Club	Season	Division	Apps	Goals	Apps	Goals	Apps	Goals	Apps	Goals
Panionios	1970–71	Alpha Ethniki	24	2	1	0	0	0	25	2
Panionios	1971–72	Alpha Ethniki	23	3	3	1	0	0	26	4
Panionios	1972–73	Alpha Ethniki	29	9	2	0	0	0	31	9
Panionios	1973–74	Alpha Ethniki	30	10	2	1	0	0	32	11
Panionios	1974–75	Alpha Ethniki	29	11	4	2	0	0	33	13
Panionios	1975–76	Alpha Ethniki	0	0	0	0	0	0	0	0
AEK Athens	1976–77	Alpha Ethniki	30	18	2	0	10	3	42	21
AEK Athens	1977–78	Alpha Ethniki	33	22	5	8	4	1	42	31
AEK Athens	1978–79	Alpha Ethniki	33	31	6	7	4	2	43	40
AEK Athens	1979–80	Alpha Ethniki	28	14	3	5	2	0	34	19
AEK Athens	1980–81	Alpha Ethniki	22	9	6	3	1	3	29	15
AEK Athens	1981–82	Alpha Ethniki	30	17	2	2	0	0	32	19
AEK Athens	1982–83	Alpha Ethniki	32	19 (Note: His goal against Rodos on 20 February 1983 didn't count as the game was suspended.)	7	12	2	0	43	31
AEK Athens	1983–84	Alpha Ethniki	21	13	6	4	2	0	29	17
AEK Athens	1984–85	Alpha Ethniki	29	27	0	0	0	0	29	27
AEK Athens	1985–86	Alpha Ethniki	17	4	4	0	1	0	22	4
AEK Athens	1986–87	Alpha Ethniki	3	0	0	0	0	0	3	0
Panionios	1987–88	Alpha Ethniki	29	16	4	2	0	0	33	18
Panionios	1988–89	Alpha Ethniki	22	12	1	0	0	0	23	12
Panionios	1989–90	Alpha Ethniki	33	22	3	2	0	0	36	24
Panionios	1990–91	Alpha Ethniki	5	1	0	0	0	0	5	1
Career total			502	260	61	49	26	9	590	318

Last updated: 2009-08-31
Source: Thomas Mavros at National-Football-Teams.com

=== International ===
National team	Season	Apps	Goals
Greece	1972	1	0
Greece	1973	1	0
Greece	1974	2	0
Greece	1975	1	1
Greece	1976	1	0
Greece	1977	5	0
Greece	1978	8	6
Greece	1979	2	0
Greece	1980	6	1
Greece	1981	3	2
Greece	1982	4	1
Greece	1984	2	0
Total		36	11

Source: Thomas Mavros at National-Football-Teams.com

List of international goals scored by Thomas Mavros
No.	Date	Venue	Opponent	Score	Result	Competition
1	4 June 1975	Toumba Stadium, Thessaloniki, Greece	Malta	1–0	4–0	1976 UEQ
2	5 April 1978	Stadion Miejski, Poznań, Poland	Poland	5–2	5–2	Friendly
3	11 October 1978	Leoforos Alexandras Stadium, Athens, Greece	Finland	4–0	8–1	1980 UEQ
4	11 October 1978	Leoforos Alexandras Stadium, Athens, Greece	Finland	5–0	8–1	1980 UEQ
5	11 October 1978	Leoforos Alexandras Stadium, Athens, Greece	Finland	7–1	8–1	1980 UEQ
6	28 October 1978	Kaftanzoglio Stadium, Thessaloniki, Greece	Hungary	4–0	4–1	1980 UEQ
7	15 November 1978	Gradski Stadium, Skopje, SFR Yugoslavia	Yugoslavia	0–1	4–1	1980 Balkan Cup
8	27 February 1980	Parc des Princes, Paris, France	France	1–1	5–1	Friendly
9	11 March 1981	Stade Municipal, Luxembourg, Luxembourg	Luxembourg	0–2	0–2	1982 WCQ
10	29 November 1981	Karaiskakis Stadium, Piraeus, Greece	Yugoslavia	1–0	1–2	1982 WCQ
11	27 October 1982	Makario Stadium, Nicosia, Cyprus	Cyprus	0–1	1–1	Friendly

== Honours ==
AEK Athens

- Alpha Ethniki: 1977–78, 1978–79
- Greek Cup: 1977–78, 1982–83

Individual

- Alpha Ethniki top scorer: 1977–78, 1978–79, 1984–85, 1989–90
- Greek Cup top scorer: 1982–83
- European Silver Shoe: 1978–79

== Records ==
- Greek championship all-time top scorer with 260 goals.
- Most goals in a league game with 5 goals in a 5–2 win against Egaleo on 27 January 1985.
- Most goals scored in the derbies against Olympiacos with 16 goals.

== Style of play ==
"If Thomas Mavros played in modern football, tons of money would be offered at his feet."

— Christos Sotirakopoulos on Mavros.

Mavros was an agile striker, noted for his movement and positioning, which enabled him to consistently find scoring opportunities. The additional personal training he undertook with weights, sand runs and other original methods for the time, increased his body strength and explosiveness, which contributed to his strong aerial ability, making him difficult to mark on the pitch. At the same time, he was a constant threat to opposing defenders and goalkeepers due to his ability to score in a variety of ways. His physical condition allowed him to maintain a high level of performance even after his mid-thirties. He was a natural leader on the pitch, as his presence boosted the morale of his teammates and contributed to the creation of an intense atmosphere in the stands. His leadership skills helped AEK Athens remain competitive during a period of financial and administrative instability.
