= Mojaš Radonjić =

Montenegrin footballer and manager

Personal information
- Full name: Mojaš Radonjić
- Date of birth: 23 February 1950 (age 76)
- Place of birth: Njeguši, FPR Yugoslavia
- Height: 1.91 m (6 ft 3 in)
- Position: Forward

Senior career*
Years	Team	Apps	(Gls)
1975	Lovćen	13	(7)
1976–1979	Budućnost Titograd	98	(27)
1979	Tampa Bay Rowdies	9	(2)
1979–1981	Budućnost Titograd	58	(25)
1981–1983	AEK Athens	41	(10)
1983–1985	Sutjeska Nikšić	43	(20)
Total		221	(81)

Managerial career
- 1989–1990: Budućnost Titograd
- 1992–1993: Mogren
- 1997: Budućnost Podgorica
- 1999: Panachaiki
- 2002: Budućnost Podgorica
- 2007: Budućnost Podgorica
- 2010: Vllaznia Shkodër
- 2013–2014: Lovćen
- 2014–2018: Montenegro U21
- * Club domestic league appearances and goals

Mojaš Radonjić (Cyrillic: Мојаш Радоњић; born 23 February 1950) is a Montenegrin football manager and former player.

== Club career ==
Radonjić started football at the age of 17, where he played with Lovćen and then transferred to Budućnost Titograd in 1976, where in the 1980–81 season he emerged as the second scorer in the Yugoslav league, with 15 goals. In his time at Budućnost Titograd, he became the club's all-time top scorer in the Yugoslav First League. He also briefly played overseas for the Tampa Bay Rowdies in the North American Soccer League.

On 1 December 1981 Radonjić moved to Greece and transferred to AEK Athens for a fee of 9 million drachma, after the suggestion of their former striker, Dušan Bajević and after he was tested by the then manager, Hans Tilkowski. He was a tall striker, strong in the air, but during the one and a half year spell at the club, he did not reach a high performance. On 21 February 1981, he scored a winner against Panathinaikos at home. He scored the equalizer in two consecutive league matches against Olympiacos. On 25 April 1982, in AEK's away match against Panserraikos, he was sent off alongside Petros Karavitis for insulting the referee. As a result, Karavitis was punished with a 19-match ban, but Radonjić served the one-match punishment as was predicted.

On 13 July 1983 Radonjić was released from AEK, despite having another year in his contract and returned to Yugoslavia to play for Sutjeska Nikšić, where he retired in 1985.

== Managerial career ==
Radonjić became a manager with many spells at Budućnost Titograd. In the summer of 1999 he returned to Greece to manage Panachaiki, but due to the negative results and the low position in the standings he was fired in the middle of the year. From December 2014 to December 2018, Radonjić served as manager of the Montenegro national under-21 team. He also managed various clubs in Yugoslavia, Montenegro, Greece, and Albania.

== Honours ==
AEK Athens

- Greek Cup: 1982–83
