= Agioi Anargyroi F.C. =

Greek football club

Agioi Anargyroi
- Full name: G.S. Agioi Anargyroi
- Founded: 1932; 94 years ago
- Ground: Agioi Anargyroi Municipal Stadium
- Chairman: Nikos Dachtylidis
- Manager: Christos Pipinis
- League: Athens FCA Second Division
- 2025–26: Athens FCA Second Division (Group 1), 4th
Home colours	Away colours

Agioi Anargyroi Football Club (Greek: Γ.Σ. Αγίων Αναργύρων) is a Greek football club based in Agioi Anargyroi, West Athens, Greece.

== History ==
The club was founded in 1926 as a football club called "Union of Saints Anargyros" and its founders are Stamatopoulos, Skarpelis Pedoulakis, Chorianopoulos and Rapakoulia, who were also the first Board of Directors of the club. In 1932 it was officially recognized by the Athens Court of First Instance and the Board of Directors of the now recognized association consisted of: President George Vogiatzis, General Secretary Athanasios Pavlidis, Treasurer and General Manager Christos Karameras, Superintendent K. Ipoukarios, members. . Chestnut. The team's colors at the time of its founding were red and black. It is the oldest sports club in the area of Agioi Anargyroi. In 1954 it was recognized by the EPO. with EPO Registration Number 485 and from the 1954–55 season the official competitive course of the club in the official championships of FCA Athens, where he has had a long presence ever since. In 1967, the Union of Saints Anargyros absorbed two other teams from the area of Agioi Anargyroi, the "Anakasiakos" and the "Karameraikos Football Club".

In the late 1990s and 2000s, she managed to advance to the Fourth National Division, from which she was relegated in 2002. In 2006, she won the EPS Championship for the first time in its history. Athens, as well as the title of Super Champion, returning again to the Fourth National. He played in the 4th National until 2011, whenever he was demoted. Then they played in the championship of FCA Athens and the 2017–18 season won the championship in the 1st group and was promoted to the Gamma Ethniki, for the first time in the history of the club.

== Honours ==
=== Domestic ===
  - Athens FCA champion: 2
    - 2005–06, 2017–18
