= Thalis Tsirimokos =

Greek footballer (1954–2022)

Personal information
- Date of birth: 7 September 1954
- Place of birth: Pagrati, Greece
- Date of death: 19 June 2022 (aged 67)
- Position: Forward

Senior career*
Years	Team	Apps	(Gls)
–1979	Kallithea		
1979–1980	PAS Giannina	31	(16)
1980–1981	Aris	22	(6)
1981–1986	OFI	114	(39)
1986–1987	Apollon Athen	12	(0)

Managerial career
- 2011: Ethnikos Piraeus
- * Club domestic league appearances and goals

Thalis Tsirimokos (Greek: Θαλής Τσιριμώκος; 7 September 1954 – 19 June 2022) was a Greek footballer who played as a forward.

== Personal life ==
Tsirimokos originated from a political family from Fthiotis.
