= 1982–83 Greek Football Cup =

1982–83 Greek Cup
Tournament details
- Country: Greece
- Teams: 74

Final positions
- Champions: AEK Athens (9th title)
- Runners-up: PAOK

Tournament statistics
- Matches played: 87
- Goals scored: 263 (3.02 per match)
- Top goal scorer(s): Thomas Mavros (12 goals)

The 1982–83 Greek Football Cup was the 41st edition of the Greek Football Cup.

== Tournament details ==
Totally 74 teams participated, each with their own favorite brand names, 18 from Alpha Ethniki, 40 from Beta, and 16 from Gamma. It was held in 7 rounds, included final. An additional round was held between First and Second, with 5 matches, in order that the teams would continue to be 32. For first time participated teams from Gamma Ethniki, while that year the particular division was established.

The final was contested by AEK Athens and PAOK. The two teams not only met themselves for a fourth consecutive year in the competition (PAOK had qualified the three previous times), but also 5 years after the 1978 final. In their advance to the final, AEK eliminated Olympiacos with two wins in quarter-finals, and Iraklis, with difficulty, with the Away goals rule in semi-finals. On the other hand, PAOK eliminated only one Alpha Ethniki team, relegated that year Rodos, in semi-finals. Earlier, Olympiacos had eliminated Panathinaikos, with an impressive appearance at the extra time.

The final was held in the packed Olympic Stadium. It was the first match between Greek clubs that was held in the new stadium, which had already hosted matches for European Cup and of Greece national team. In a match marked by crowd incidents caused by PAOK fans, AEK Athens won 2–0. Top scorer of the tournament was Mavros, who scored 12 goals.

== Calendar ==
Round	Date(s)	Fixtures	Clubs	New entries
First Round	15, 16, 23 December 1982	37	74 → 37	74
Additional Round	27 January 1983	5	37 → 32	none
Round of 32	16, 17 February 1983	16	32 → 16	none
Round of 16	9, 10 March & 14 April 1983	16	16 → 8	none
Quarter-finals	18 May & 1 June 1983	7	8 → 4	none
Semi-finals	15, 22 June 1983	4	4 → 2	none
Final	29 June 1983	1	2 → 1	none

== Knockout phase ==
Each tie in the knockout phase, apart from the first three rounds and the final, was played over two legs, with each team playing one leg at home. The team that scored more goals on aggregate over the two legs advanced to the next round. If the aggregate score was level, the away goals rule was applied, i.e. the team that scored more goals away from home over the two legs advanced. If away goals were also equal, then extra time was played. The away goals rule was again applied after extra time, i.e. if there were goals scored during extra time and the aggregate score was still level, the visiting team advanced by virtue of more away goals scored. If no goals were scored during extra time, the winners were decided by a penalty shoot-out. In the first three rounds and the final, which were played as a single match, if the score was level at the end of normal time, extra time was played, followed by a penalty shoot-out if the score was still level.
The mechanism of the draws for each round is as follows:

- There are no seedings, and teams from the same group can be drawn against each other.

== First round ==
Team 1	Score	Team 2
Aiolikos	2–0	Ilisiakos
Iraklis	3–0	PAS Giannina
Panionios	4–0	Florina
Panarkadikos	1–1 (3–5 p)	Ethnikos Piraeus
Eordaikos	1–0	Agrotikos Asteras
Toxotis Volos	1–2	AO Chania
Apollon Kalamarias	2–1 (a.e.t.)	Pierikos
Diagoras	1–0	Olympiakos Loutraki
Atromitos	3–0	Preveza
OFI	6–0	Levadiakos
Korinthos	0–1	Kavala
Odysseas Kordelio	1–0 (a.e.t.)	Thiva
Aris	5–0	Niki Volos
Almopos Aridea	0–0 (6–5 p)	Panetolikos
Kastoria	7–4	Chalkida
Doxa Drama	2–1	Makedonikos
APE Langadas	1–2	Panathinaikos
Vyzas Megara	1–0	Atromitos Piraeus
Egaleo	2–1	Ethnikos Asteras
Paniliakos	1–1 (3–0 p)	AEL
Kilkisiakos	1–2	AEK Athens
A.O. Nikea	1–1 (1–3 p)	Irodotos
Athinaikos	0–1	Proodeftiki
Panachaiki	2–0	Apollon Athens
Fostiras	3–1 (a.e.t.)	Alexandroupoli
Lamia	2–0	Panelefsiniakos
Veria	2–1	Anagennisi Giannitsa
Olympiacos	2–0	Achaiki
Panegialios	0–2	Panserraikos
Anagennisi Epanomi	1–1 (2–4 p)	Naoussa
Panargiakos	2–1	Edessaikos
Ethnikos Alexandroupoli	1–0	Panthrakikos
PAOK	7–0	Anagennisi Karditsa
Trikala	1–1 (6–5 p)	Acharnaikos
Olympiacos Volos	3–1	Kallithea
Kozani	3–2	Ionikos
Rodos	3–0	Xanthi

== Additional round ==
Team 1	Score	Team 2
Odysseas Kordelio	0–0 (4–1 p)	Kavala
Panachaiki	3–0	Olympiacos Volos
Almopos Aridea	0–3	PAOK
Vyzas Megara	3–2 (a.e.t.)	Ethnikos Piraeus
Paniliakos	1–2	Naoussa

== Bracket ==
Round of 32
Kozani (p)	1(5)
Panionios	1(3)
Panachaiki	3
Fostiras	0
Iraklis	2
Aris	1
Kastoria	6
Aiolikos	1
AEK Athens	4
Panserraikos	2
Irodotos (a.e.t.)	3
Veria	2
OFI	0
Panathinaikos	1
Olympiacos	7
AO Chania	2
Panargiakos	2
Eordaikos	0
Odysseas Kordelio	2
Apollon Kalamarias	1
Ethnikos Alexandroupoli	2
Atromitos	0
Vyzas Megara	1
PAOK	3
Egaleo	3
Lamia	1
Rodos	3
Trikala	2
Naoussa	1
Doxa Drama	4
Proodeftiki	4
Diagoras	0

Round of 16
Kozani	0	1	1
Panachaiki	2	3	5
Iraklis	1	3	4
Kastoria	0	2	2
AEK Athens	3	6	9
Irodotos	1	0	1
Panathinaikos	1	0	1
Olympiacos (a.e.t.)	0	4	4
Panargiakos (a)	1	1	2
Odysseas Kordelio	0	2	2
Ethnikos Alexandroupoli	0	0	0
PAOK	2	4	6
Egaleo	0	0	0
Rodos	0	2	2
Doxa Drama	2	1	3
Proodeftiki (a.e.t.)	1	3	4

Quarter-finals
Panachaiki	0	2	2
Iraklis	3	7	10
AEK Athens	2	1	3
Olympiacos	1	0	1
Panargiakos	0	0	0
PAOK	1	2	3
Rodos (p)	1	1	2(4)
Proodeftiki	1	1	2(1)

Semi-finals
Iraklis	3	0	3
AEK Athens (a)	1	2	3
PAOK	2	1	3
Rodos	0	0	0

Final
AEK Athens	2
PAOK	0

== Round of 32 ==
Team 1	Score	Team 2
Ethnikos Alexandroupoli	2–0	Atromitos
Odysseas Kordelio	2–1	Apollon Kalamarias
Irodotos	3–2 (a.e.t.)	Veria
Vyzas Megara	1–3	PAOK
Olympiacos	7–2	AO Chania
Iraklis	2–1	Aris
Panargiakos	2–0	Eordaikos
Proodeftiki	4–0	Diagoras
Naoussa	1–4	Doxa Drama
Panachaiki	3–0	Fostiras
Kastoria	6–1	Aiolikos
OFI	0–1	Panathinaikos
Rodos	3–2	Trikala
AEK Athens	4–2	Panserraikos
Kozani	1–1 (5–3 p)	Panionios
Egaleo	3–1	Lamia

== Round of 16 ==
Team 1	Agg.	Team 2	1st leg	2nd leg
Panargiakos	(a) 2–2	Odysseas Kordelio	1–0	1–2
Kozani	1–5	Panachaiki	0–2	1–3
Iraklis	4–2	Kastoria	1–0	3–2
Ethnikos Alexandroupoli	0–6	PAOK	0–2	0–4
Panathinaikos	1–4	Olympiacos	1–0	0–4 (a.e.t.)
Egaleo	0–2	Rodos	0–0	0–2
Doxa Drama	3–4	Proodeftiki	2–1	1–3 (a.e.t.)
AEK Athens	9–1	Irodotos	3–1	6–0

== Quarter-finals ==
Team 1	Agg.	Team 2	1st leg	2nd leg
AEK Athens	3–1	Olympiacos	2–1	1–0
Panargiakos	0–3	PAOK	0–1	0–2 (w/o)
Panachaiki	2–10	Iraklis	0–3	2–7
Rodos	2–2 (4–1 p)	Proodeftiki	1–1	1–1

== Semi-finals ==
=== Summary ===
Team 1	Agg.	Team 2	1st leg	2nd leg
Iraklis	3–3 (a)	AEK Athens	3–1	0–2
PAOK	3–0	Rodos	2–0	1–0

=== Matches ===
15 June 1983
17:30 EEST

Iraklis	3–1	AEK Athens
Papadopoulos 7', 32'; Adamou 48'		Kottis 90'

Kaftanzoglio Stadium, Thessaloniki
Attendance: 28,442
Referee: Dimitris Koutoulas (Serres)
22 June 1983
17:00 EEST

AEK Athens	2–0	Iraklis
Galatidis 66' (o.g.); Mavros 20'

AEK Stadium, Nea Filadelfeia
Attendance: 28,294
Referee: Nikos Kapetanakis (Piraeus)

AEK Athens won on away goals.

15 June 1983

PAOK	2–0	Rodos
Kostikos 35', 48'

Toumba Stadium, Thessaloniki
Attendance: 5,573
Referee: Michalis Matsoukas (Euboea)
22 June 1983

Rodos	0–1	PAOK
		Papaoikonomou 66' (o.g.)

Diagoras Stadium, Rhodes

PAOK won 3–0 on aggregate.

== Final ==
29 June 1983
21:00 EEST

AEK Athens	2–0	PAOK
Mavros 27'; Vlachos 80'	Report

Olympic Stadium, Marousi
Attendance: 72,240
Referee: Antonis Vassaras (Thessaloniki)
