= 1992 Greek Football Cup final =

1992 Greek Cup final
- Event: 1991–92 Greek Football Cup
PAOK	Olympiacos
1	3
- on aggregate

First leg
PAOK	Olympiacos
1	1
- Date: 20 May 1992
- Venue: Toumba Stadium, Thessaloniki
- Referee: Kostas Dimitriadis (Piraeus)
- Attendance: 25,744

Second leg
Olympiacos	PAOK
2	0
- Date: 27 May 1992
- Venue: Karaiskakis Stadium, Piraeus
- Referee: Stavros Zakestidis (Thessaloniki)
- Attendance: 29,831

The 1992 Greek Cup final was the 48th final of the Greek Cup. The final, was set for the second and last time to be played over two legs in the home ground of the 2 finalists. The contesting teams were PAOK and Olympiacos. It was PAOK's fourteenth Greek Cup final in their 66 years of existence and Olympiacos' twenty-six Greek Cup final in their 67-year history. The first match took place on 20 May 1992 at Toumba Stadium and the second match took place on 27 May 1992 at Karaiskakis Stadium. It was the first time that a private channel ANT1, was covering a Cup final, since all the finals were until then covered by ERT.

== Background ==
PAOK had reached the Greek Cup final thirteen times, winning two of them. The last time that they had won the Cup was in 1974 (4–3 on penalties, which came after a 2–2 draw at the end of the extra time against Olympiacos). The last time that they had played in a final was in 1985, where they had lost to AEL by 4–1.

Olympiacos had reached the Greek Cup final twenty-five times, winning nineteen of them. The last time that they played in a final was in 1990, where they had won against OFI by 4–2.

The two teams had met each other in a Cup final five times in the 1951, 1971, 1973, 1974 and 1981 finals.

== Route to the final ==
PAOK				Round	Olympiacos			
Opponent	Result			Group stage	Opponent	Result		
Poseidon Michaniona	2–3 (A)			Matchday 1	Panionios	Unknown		
Poseidon Heraklion	5–0 (H)			Matchday 2	Ilisiakos	Unknown		
Olympiacos Volos	1–1 (A)			Matchday 3	Naoussa	Unknown		
AE Mesolongi	4–1 (H)			Matchday 4	Preveza	Unknown		
Group 4 runners-up: Team / Pts; Poseidon Michaniona / 6; PAOK / 5; Olympiacos Volos / 4; AE Mesolongi / 4; Poseidon Heraklion / 1				Final standings	Group 5 winners: Team / Pts; Olympiacos / 6; Panionios / 5; Ilisiakos / 4; Naoussa / 3; Preveza / 2			
Opponent	Agg.	1st leg	2nd leg	Knockout phase	Opponent	Agg.	1st leg	2nd leg
A.F.C. Patra	4–1	1–0 (A)	3–1 (H)	Round of 32	Kastoria	7–0	3–1 (A)	4–0 (H)
Korinthos	4–1	4–1 (H)	0–0 (A)	Round of 16	Skoda Xanthi	5–4	1–2 (A)	4–2 (H)
Doxa Drama	4–2	0–2 (A)	4–0 (H)	Quarter-finals	Panathinaikos	1–1 (a)	0–0 (H)	1–1 (A)
AEK Athens	3–2	0–2 (A)	3–0 (a.e.t.) (H)	Semi-finals	Atromitos	8–2	4–1 (A)	4–1 (H)

== Match ==
=== First leg ===
20 May 1992
18:00 EEST

PAOK	1–1	Olympiacos
Skartados 52'	Report (page 2)	Tsalouchidis 63'

Toumba Stadium, Thessaloniki
Attendance: 25,744
Referee: Kostas Dimitriadis (Piraeus)

PAOK	Olympiacos

GK	(Croatia) Tonči Gabrić
DF	(Greece) Nikos Plitsis
DF	(Greece) Michalis Leontiadis
DF	(Greece) Alexandros Alexiou
DF	(Greece) Georgios Mitsibonas
MF	(Greece) Kostas Oikonomidis	(substituted off) 63'
MF	(Greece) Kostas Lagonidis
MF	(Greece) Stefanos Borbokis
MF	(Greece) Georgios Skartados (c)
MF	(Greece) Georgios Toursounidis
FW	(Federal Republic of Yugoslavia) Milan Đurđević	(substituted off) 59'
Substitutes:
FW	(Greece) John Anastasiadis	(substituted on) 59'
FW	(Greece) Thanasis Basbanas	(substituted on) 63'
Manager:
(Greece) Giannis Gounaris

GK	1	(Greece) Ilias Talikriadis
DF	2	(Greece) Theodoros Pachatouridis
DF	3	(Greece) Kyriakos Karataidis
DF	4	(Greece) Michalis Vlachos
DF	5	(Greece) Nikos Nentidis	(substituted off) 55'
MF	6	(Greece) Panagiotis Tsalouchidis (c)
MF	7	(Ukraine) Hennadiy Lytovchenko
MF	8	(Greece) Nikos Tsiantakis
FW	9	(Russia) Yuri Savichev
FW	10	(Ukraine) Oleh Protasov
FW	11	(Greece) Panagiotis Sofianopoulos	(substituted off) 77'
Substitutes:
MF		(Greece) Minas Hantzidis	(substituted on) 55'
FW		(Greece) Georgios Vaitsis	(substituted on) 77'
Manager:
(Ukraine) Oleg Blokhin

Assistant referees:
Rentzis (Piraeus)
Panagiotis Perlorentzos (Piraeus)

Match rules

- 90 minutes
- Five named substitutes
- Maximum of two substitutions.

=== Second leg ===
27 May 1992
20:30 EEST

Olympiacos	2–0 (3–1 agg.)	PAOK
Lytovchenko 21'; Tsalouchidis 62'	Report (page 2)

Karaiskakis Stadium, Piraeus
Attendance: 29,831
Referee: Stavros Zakestidis (Thessaloniki)

Olympiacos	PAOK

GK	1	(Greece) Ilias Talikriadis
DF	2	(Greece) Theodoros Pachatouridis
DF	3	(Greece) Kyriakos Karataidis
DF	4	(Greece) Michalis Vlachos
DF	5	(Greece) Nikos Nentidis		(substituted off) 54'
MF	6	(Greece) Panagiotis Tsalouchidis (c)
MF	7	(Ukraine) Hennadiy Lytovchenko
MF	8	(Greece) Nikos Tsiantakis	(yellow card) 54'
FW	9	(Russia) Yuri Savichev	(red card) 69'
FW	10	(Ukraine) Oleh Protasov
FW	11	(Greece) Panagiotis Sofianopoulos		(substituted off) 64'
Substitutes:
MF		(Greece) Minas Hantzidis		(substituted on) 54'
MF		(Greece) Vassilis Karapialis		(substituted on) 64'
Manager:
(Ukraine) Oleg Blokhin

GK	1	(Croatia) Tonči Gabrić
DF	8	(Greece) Kostas Malioufas		(substituted off) 73'
DF	3	(Greece) Alexandros Alexiou	(yellow card) 52'
DF	4	(Greece) Georgios Mitsibonas
MF	2	(Greece) Kostas Oikonomidis
MF	6	(Greece) Kostas Lagonidis
MF	7	(Greece) Stefanos Borbokis
MF	5	(Greece) Georgios Skartados (c)
MF	10	(Greece) Georgios Toursounidis
FW	11	(Greece) John Anastasiadis
FW	9	(Federal Republic of Yugoslavia) Milan Đurđević		(substituted off) 46'
Substitutes:
DF		(Greece) Dimitrios Mitoglou	(yellow card) 80'	(substituted on) 73'
MF		(Greece) Vangelis Kalogeropoulos	(yellow card) 68'	(substituted on) 46'
Manager:
(Greece) Giannis Gounaris

Assistant referees:
Tsinaslanidis (Thessaloniki)
Filippos Bakas (Thessaloniki)

Match rules

- 90 minutes
- 30 minutes of extra time if necessary
- Penalty shootout if scores still level
- Five named substitutes
- Maximum of two substitutions

== See also ==
- 1991–92 Greek Football Cup
