= 1993 Greek Football Cup final =

1993 Greek Cup final
- Event: 1992–93 Greek Football Cup
Olympiacos	Panathinaikos
0	1
- Date: 12 May 1993
- Venue: Olympic Stadium, Marousi, Athens
- Referee: Giorgos Bikas (Chalkidiki)
- Attendance: 64,532

The 1993 Greek Cup final was the 49th final of the Greek Cup. The match took place on 12 May 1993 at the Olympic Stadium. The contesting teams were Olympiacos and Panathinaikos. It was Olympiacos' twenty-seventh Greek Cup final and second consecutive in their 68 years of existence and Panathinaikos' twentieth Greek Cup finalin their 85-year history. Before the match, the manager of Olympiacos Nikos Alefantos had a peculiar idea. He made all his football players to get a haircut as he thought it would work as a charm. Additionally at that time, short hair was not that fashionable and most footballers had long hairstyle. In the end, Olympiacos saw his trick with the haircuts not succeeding, with the only thing that they achieved was for the match to be remembered as the "final of the shaved heads".

== Venue ==
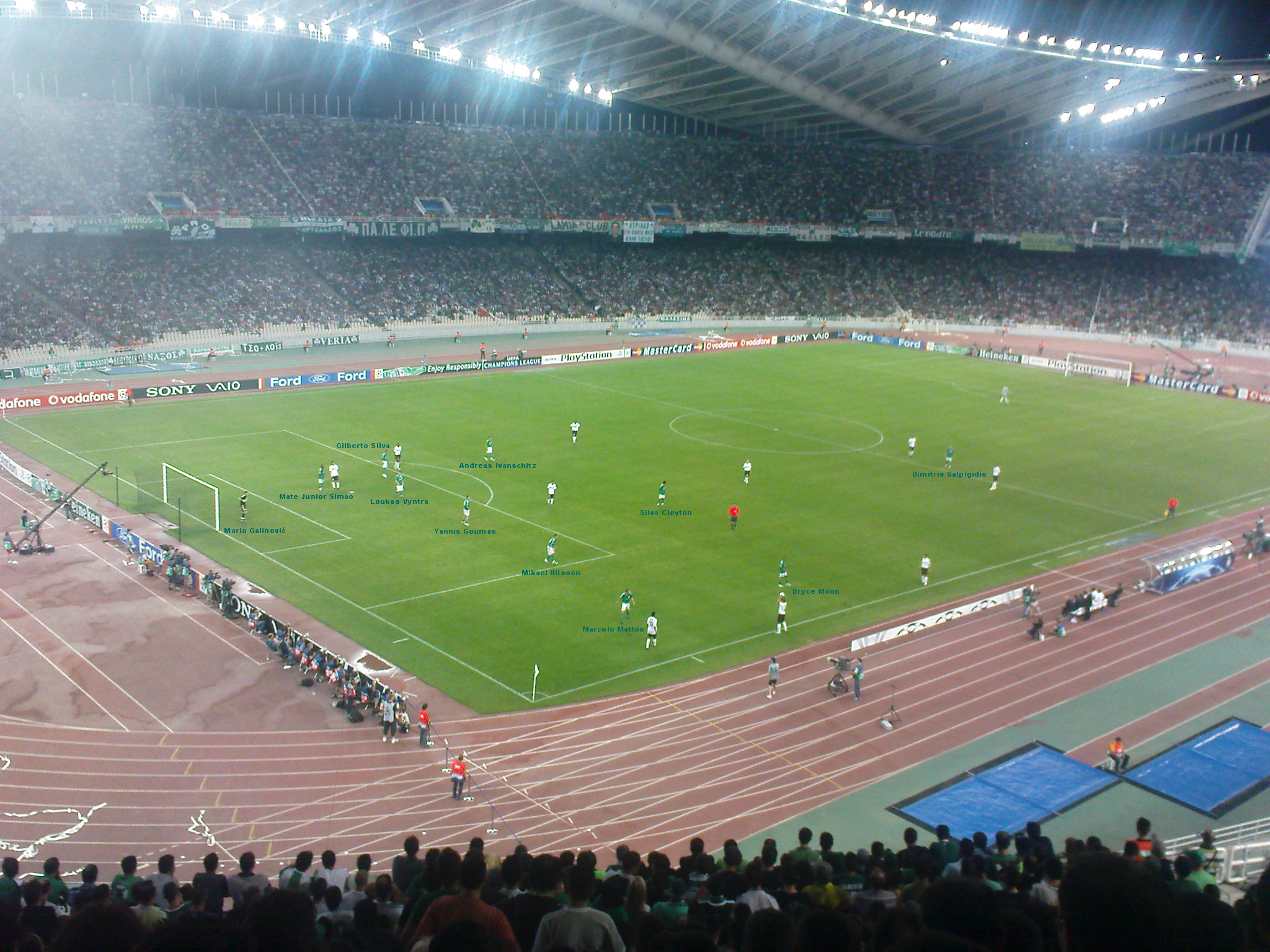
Athens Olympic Stadium.

This was the ninth Greek Cup final held at the Athens Olympic Stadium, after the 1983, 1984, 1985, 1986, 1987, 1988, 1989 and 1990 finals.

The Athens Olympic Stadium was built in 1982. The stadium is used as a venue for Panathinaikos and Greece and was used for Olympiacos and AEK Athens on various occasions. Its current capacity is 80,000 and hosted a European Cup/UEFA Champions League final in 1983, a European Cup Winners' Cup final in 1987 and the 1991 Mediterranean Games.

== Background ==
Olympiacos had reached the Greek Cup final twenty six times, winning nineteen of them. The last time that they played in a final was in 1992, where they had won against PAOK by 3–1 on aggregate (1–1 at Toumba Stadium and 2–0 at Karaiskakis Stadium).

Panathinaikos had reached the Greek Cup final nineteen times, winning twelve of them. The last time that they played in a final was in 1991, where they had won against Athinaikos by 5–1 on aggregate (3–0 at Leoforos Alexandras Stadium and 2–1 at the Olympic Stadium).

The two teams had met each other in a Cup final eight times in the 1960, 1962, 1965, 1968, 1969, 1975, 1986 and 1988 finals.

== Route to the final ==
Olympiacos				Round	Panathinaikos			
Opponent	Result			Group stage	Opponent	Result		
Atromitos	Unknown			Matchday 1	Kalamata	Unknown		
Anagennisi Chalkidona	Unknown			Matchday 2	Trikala	Unknown		
Aiolikos	Unknown			Panelefsiniakos	Matchday 3	Unknown		
Anagennisi Arta	Unknown			Matchday 4	Kastoria	Unknown		
Group 3 winners: Team / Pts; Olympiacos / 8; Atromitos / 6; Anagennisi Chalkidona / 4; Aiolikos / 1; Anagennisi Arta / 1				Final standings	Group 7 winners: Team / Pts; Panathinaikos / 6; Kalamata / 5; Trikala / 4; Panelefsiniakos / 3; Kastoria / 2			
Opponent	Agg.	1st leg	2nd leg	Knockout phase	Opponent	Agg.	1st leg	2nd leg
Pierikos	5–0	2–2 (A)	3–0 (H)	Round of 32	Paniliakos	8–2	2–1 (A)	6–1 (H)
Olympiacos Volos	3–1	1–0 (H)	2–1 (A)	Round of 16	Iraklis	3–0	2–0 (A)	1–0 (H)
Doxa Drama	5–2	4–1 (A)	1–1 (H)	Quarter-finals	OFI	7–3	5–2 (H)	2–1 (A)
AEK Athens	3–3 (a)	1–0 (H)	2–3 (a.e.t.) (A)	Semi-finals	Apollon Athens	3–0	0–0 (A)	3–0 (H)

== Match ==
=== Details ===
12 May 1993
21:00 EEST

Olympiacos	0–1	Panathinaikos
	Report (page 3)	Warzycha 13'

Olympic Stadium, Marousi
Attendance: 64,532
Referee: Giorgos Bikas (Chalkidiki)

Olympiacos	Panathinaikos

GK	1	(Greece) Ilias Talikriadis
DF	2	(Greece) Theodoros Pachatouridis
DF	3	(Greece) Kyriakos Karataidis	(red card) 50'
DF	4	(Greece) Georgios Mitsibonas
MF	5	(Greece) Sotiris Mavromatis
MF	6	(Greece) Panagiotis Tsalouchidis (c)
MF	7	(Ukraine) Hennadiy Lytovchenko		(substituted off) 77'
MF	8	(Greece) Nikos Tsiantakis
MF	10	(Greece) Ilias Savvidis		(substituted off) 73'
FW	11	(Ukraine) Oleh Protasov
FW	9	(Greece) Daniel Batista
Substitutes:
MF		(Greece) Vassilis Karapialis		(substituted on) 77'
FW		(Greece) Georgios Vaitsis		(substituted on) 73'
Manager:
(Federal Republic of Yugoslavia) Ljupko Petrović

GK	1	(Poland) Józef Wandzik
DF	2	(Greece) Stratos Apostolakis
DF	7	(Greece) Marinos Ouzounidis
DF	5	(Greece) Giannis Kalitzakis
DF	6	(Greece) Kostas Mavridis (c)
DF	3	(Greece) Giorgos Kapouranis
MF	4	(Greece) Louis Christodoulou
MF	8	(Greece) Kostas Antoniou
MF	11	(Greece) Spyros Marangos
MF	10	(Greece) Giorgos Georgiadis	(substituted off) 89'
FW	9	(Poland) Krzysztof Warzycha	(substituted off) 90'
Substitutes:
MF		(Greece) Kostas Frantzeskos	(substituted on) 90'
FW		(Greece) Georgios Donis	(substituted on) 89'
Manager:
(Bosnia and Herzegovina) Ivica Osim

Assistant referees:
Vassilios Nikakis (Aetoloacarnania)
Stavros Zakestidis (Thessaloniki)

Match rules

- 90 minutes
- 30 minutes of extra time if necessary
- Penalty shootout if scores still level
- Five named substitutes
- Maximum of two substitutions

== See also ==
- 1992–93 Greek Football Cup
