= 1990 Greek Football Cup final =

1990 Greek Cup final
- Event: 1989–90 Greek Football Cup
OFI	Olympiacos
2	4
- Date: 17 May 1990
- Venue: Olympic Stadium, Marousi, Athens
- Referee: Stavros Zakestidis (Thessaloniki)
- Attendance: 47,627

The 1990 Greek Cup final was the 46th final of the Greek Cup. The match took place on 17 May 1990 at the Olympic Stadium. The contesting teams were OFI and Olympiacos. It was OFI's second Greek Cup final in their 65 years of existence and Olympiacos' twenty-fifth Greek Cup final in their 65-year history.

== Venue ==
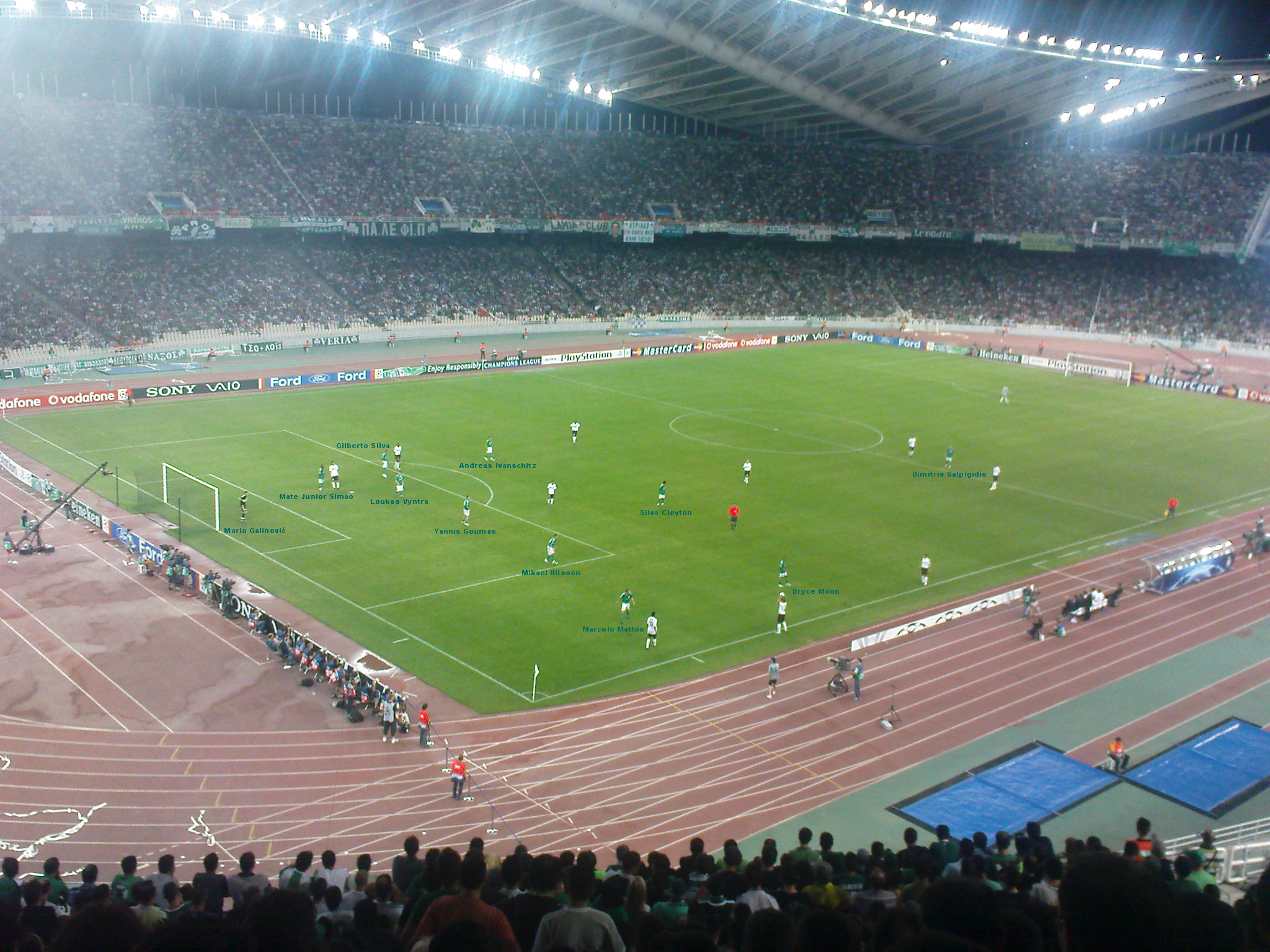
Athens Olympic Stadium.

This was the eighth Greek Cup final held at the Athens Olympic Stadium, after the 1983, 1984, 1985, 1986, 1987, 1988 and 1989 finals.

The Athens Olympic Stadium was built in 1982. The stadium is used as a venue for Panathinaikos and Greece and was used for Olympiacos and AEK Athens on various occasions. Its current capacity is 80,000 and hosted a European Cup final in 1983 and a European Cup Winners' Cup final in 1987.

== Background ==
OFI had reached the Greek Cup one time, in 1987, where they had won against Iraklis by 3–1 on penalties, which came after a 1–1 draw at the end of the extra time.

Olympiacos had reached the Greek Cup final twenty four times, winning seventeen of them. The last time that they won the Cup was in 1981 (3–1 against PAOK). The last time that they played in a final was in 1988, where they had lost to Panathinaikos by 4–3 on penalties, which came after a 2–2 draw at the end of the extra time.

The two teams had never met each other in a Cup final.

== Route to the final ==
OFI				Round	Olympiacos			
Opponent	Result			Group stage	Opponent	Result		
Kerkyra	Unknown			Matchday 1	Sparta	Unknown		
Odysseas Kordelio	Unknown			Matchday 2	Korinthos	Unknown		
Nigrita	Unknown			Matchday 3	Kallithea	Unknown		
Not played				Matchday 4	Irodotos	Unknown		
Group 15 winners: Team / Pts; OFI / 5; Kerkyra / 3; Odysseas Kordelio / 3; Nigrita / 1				Final standings	Group 2 winners: Team / Pts; Olympiacos / 6; Sparta / 5; Korinthos / 4; Kallithea / 4; Irodotos / 1			
Opponent	Agg.	1st leg	2nd leg	Knockout phase	Opponent	Agg.	1st leg	2nd leg
Panserraikos	9–3	3–2 (A)	6–1 (H)	Round of 32	Proodeftiki	3–1	1–1 (A)	2–0 (H)
Aris	2–1	1–1 (H)	1–0 (A)	Round of 16	PAOK	1–1 (5–3 p)	0–1 (A)	1–0 (a.e.t.) (H)
Athinaikos	5–3	0–3 (A)	5–0 (H)	Quarter-finals	Olympiacos Volos	6–2	5–0 (H)	1–2 (A)
Apollon Athens	1–0	0–0 (H)	1–0 (A)	Semi-finals	Panathinaikos	5–4	2–1 (H)	3–3 (a.e.t.) (A)

== Match ==
=== Details ===
17 May 1990
21:00 EEST

OFI	2–4	Olympiacos
Vlastos 48'; Tsimbos 53'	Report	Tsalouchidis 12', 69'; Détári 29' (pen.), 89'

Olympic Stadium, Marousi
Attendance: 47,627
Referee: Stavros Zakestidis (Thessaloniki)

OFI	Olympiacos

GK	(Greece) Kostas Chaniotakis	(yellow card) 28'
DF	(Greece) Nikos Goulis (c)		(substituted off) 81'
DF	(Greece) Stefanos Vavoulas	(yellow card) (yellow-red card) 76'
DF	(Greece) Manolis Patemtzis
DF	(Greece) Nikos Tsimpos
DF	(Chile) Alejandro Hisis
MF	(Greece) Miltos Andreanidis	(yellow card) 70'
MF	(Chile) Jaime Vera
MF	(Greece) Nikos Nioplias
FW	(Greece) Georgios Vlastos		(substituted off) 83'
FW	(Greece) Dimosthenis Kavouras
Substitutes:
MF	(Greece) Grigoris Tsinos	(yellow card) 90' (yellow-red card) 90'	(substituted on) 81'
MF	(Greece) Kostas Batsinilas		(substituted on) 83'
Manager:
(Netherlands) Eugène Gerards

GK	(Greece) Ilias Talikriadis
DF	(Greece) Stratos Apostolakis
DF	(Greece) Theodoros Pachatouridis
DF	(Greece) Alexandros Alexiou
DF	(Greece) Kyriakos Karataidis
MF	(Greece) Panagiotis Tsalouchidis
MF	(Greece) Sotiris Mavrommatis	(substituted off) 76'
MF	(Greece) Savvas Kofidis	(substituted off) 90+1'
MF	(Greece) Tasos Mitropoulos (c)
MF	(Hungary) Lajos Détári
FW	(Greece) Nikos Anastopoulos
Substitutes:
MF	(Greece) Nikos Tsiantakis	(substituted on) 76'
FW	(Greece) Apostolos Drakopoulos	(substituted on) 90+1'
Manager:
(Hungary) Imre Komora

Assistant referees:
Stratos Kannos (Athens)
Lefteris Filippidis (Patras)

Match rules

- 90 minutes
- 30 minutes of extra time if necessary
- Penalty shootout if scores still level
- Five named substitutes
- Maximum of two substitutions

== See also ==
- 1989–90 Greek Football Cup
