= 1988 Greek Football Cup final =

1988 Greek Cup final
- Event: 1987–88 Greek Football Cup
Olympiacos	Panathinaikos
2	2
- After extra time Panathinaikos won 4–3 on penalties
- Date: 8 May 1988
- Venue: Olympic Stadium, Marousi, Athens
- Referee: Meletis Voutsaras (Athens)
- Attendance: 73,375

The 1988 Greek Cup final was the 44th final of the Greek Cup. The match took place on 8 May 1988 at the Olympic Stadium. The contesting teams were Olympiacos and Panathinaikos. It was Olympiacos' twenty-fourth Greek Cup final in their 63 years of existence and Panathinaikos' seventeenth Greek Cup final in their 80-year history. Both clubs were extra motivated for the title since were out of the championship race and were looking for a ticket to the UEFA competition. The match went into penalty shoot-out where the goalkeeper of Panathinaikos, Nikos Sarganis emerged as the hero for his team, saving two penalties and scoring one. In a future interview, the Greek goalkeeper revealed that the owner of Olympiacos, George Koskotas attempted to bribe him for reduced performance in the final. That would be the second time Koskotas was accused for attempted bribery, as he did the same as well on Theologis Papadopoulos and Vasilios Vasilakos of AEK Athens at the round of 16.

== Venue ==
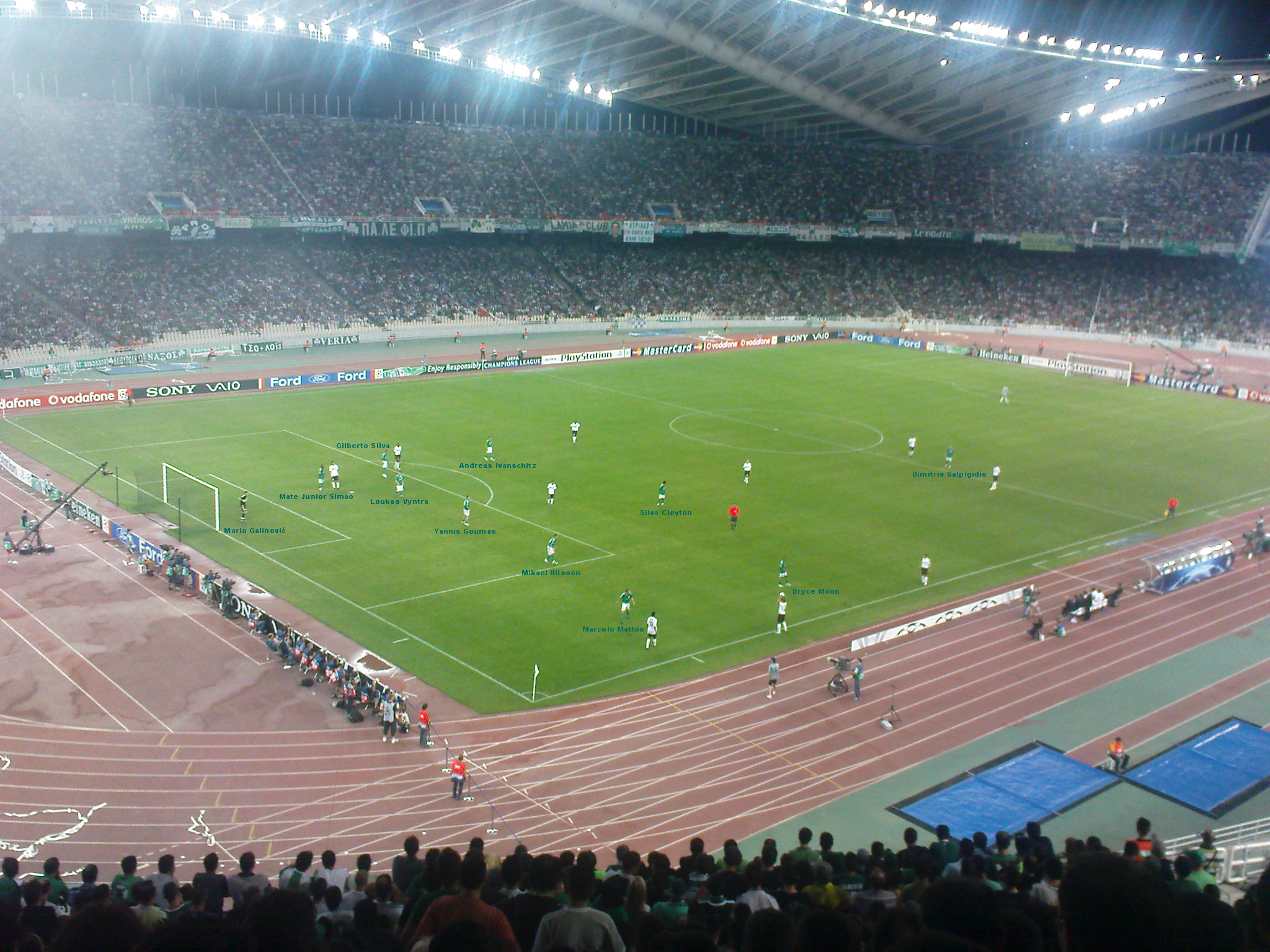
Athens Olympic Stadium.

This was the sixth Greek Cup final held at the Athens Olympic Stadium, after the 1983, 1984, 1985, 1986 and 1987 finals.

The Athens Olympic Stadium was built in 1982. The stadium is used as a venue for Panathinaikos, Olympiacos and Greece and was used for AEK Athens on various occasions. Its current capacity is 80,000 and hosted a European Cup final in 1983 and a European Cup Winners' Cup final in 1987.

== Background ==
Olympiacos had reached the Greek Cup final twenty-three times, winning seventeen of them. The last time that they won the Cup was in 1981 (3–1 against PAOK). The last time that they played in a final was in 1986, where they had lost to Panathinaikos by 4–0.

Panathinaikos had reached the Greek Cup final sixteen times, winning nine of them. The last time that they played in a final was in 1986, where they had won against Olympiacos by 4–0.

The two teams had met each other in a Cup final seven times in the 1960, 1962, 1965, 1968, 1969, 1975 and 1986 finals.

== Route to the final ==
Olympiacos				Round	Panathinaikos			
Opponent	Agg.	1st leg	2nd leg		Opponent	Agg.	1st leg	2nd leg
Agrotikos Asteras	4–0 (H)			First round	Chalkida	2–0 (H)		
Bye				Additional round	Kavala	7–2 (H)		
Olympiacos Volos	6–0	1–0 (A)	5–0 (H)	Round of 32	Panserraikos	2–0	0–0 (A)	2–0 (H)
AEK Athens	4–1	1–1 (H)	3–1 (A)	Round of 16	PAS Giannina	10–3	2–1 (A)	8–2 (H)
Apollon Kalamarias	2–1	0–0 (A)	2–1 (H)	Quarter-finals	Irodotos	6–0	4–0 (A)	2–0 (H)
OFI	3–1	3–0 (H)	0–1 (A)	Semi-finals	AEL	4–1	1–0 (H)	3–1 (A)

== Match ==
=== Details ===
8 May 1988
20:30 EEST

Olympiacos	2–2 (a.e.t.)	Panathinaikos
Funes 59' (pen.), 98' (pen.)	Report	Saravakos 31' (pen.); Dimopoulos 102'
Penalties
Alexiou (penalty scored); Baniotis (penalty scored); Hantzidis (penalty missed); Apostolakis (penalty scored); Funes (penalty missed)	3–4	(penalty scored) Vlachos; (penalty scored) Sarganis; (penalty scored) Dimopoulos; (penalty scored) Georgamlis

Olympic Stadium, Marousi
Attendance: 73,375
Referee: Meletis Voutsaras (Athens)

Olympiacos	Panathinaikos

GK	(Greece) Ilias Talikriadis
DF	(Greece) Stratos Apostolakis
DF	(Greece) Alexandros Alexiou
DF	(Greece) Charis Baniotis
DF	(Greece) Petros Xanthopoulos (c)
MF	(Greece) Minas Hantzidis
MF	(Greece) Panagiotis Tsalouchidis
MF	(Greece) Andreas Bonovas	(substituted off) 46'
MF	(Greece) Tasos Mitropoulos
FW	(Argentina) Juan Gilberto Funes
FW	(Greece) Nikos Tsiantakis
Substitutes:
GK	(Greece) Georgios Plitsis
DF	(Greece) Theodoros Pachatouridis
MF	(Greece) Giorgos Kapouranis
FW	(Greece) Panagiotis Sofianopoulos
FW	(Greece) Sakis Moustakidis	(substituted on) 46'
Manager:
(Greece) Pavlos Grigoriadis, (Greece) Giannis Gounaris

GK	(Greece) Nikos Sarganis
DF	(Greece) Iakovos Chatziathanasiou
DF	(Greece) Kostas Mavridis
DF	(Greece) Giannis Kalitzakis
DF	(Greece) Nikos Vamvakoulas
MF	(Socialist Federal Republic of Yugoslavia) Velimir Zajec (c)		(substituted off) 75'
MF	(Greece) Louis Christodoulou		(substituted off) 46'
MF	(Greece) Christos Dimopoulos
MF	(Argentina) Juan Ramón Rocha
FW	(Greece) Dimitris Saravakos
FW	(Greece) Lysandros Georgamlis
Substitutes:
GK	(Greece) Antonis Minou
DF	(Greece) Nikos Patsiavouras
MF	(Greece) Vangelis Vlachos		(substituted on) 75'
MF	(Greece) Chris Kalantzis
FW	(Greece) Kostas Batsinilas	(red card) 79'	(substituted on) 46'
Manager:
(Sweden) Gunder Bengtsson

Assistant referees:
Vassilios Nikakis (Aetoloacarnania)
Kostas Dimitriadis (Piraeus)

Match rules

- 90 minutes
- 30 minutes of extra time if necessary
- Penalty shootout if scores still level
- Five named substitutes
- Maximum of two substitutions

== See also ==
- 1987–88 Greek Football Cup
