= 1999 Greek Football Cup final =

1999 Greek Cup final
- Event: 1998–99 Greek Football Cup
Panathinaikos	Olympiacos
0	2
- Date: 5 May 1999
- Venue: Olympic Stadium, Marousi, Athens
- Referee: Giorgos Douros (Corinthia)
- Attendance: 57,783

The 1999 Greek Cup final was the 55th final of the Greek Cup. The match took place on 5 May 1999 at the Olympic Stadium. The contesting teams were Panathinaikos and Olympiacos. It was Panathinaikos' twenty fifth Greek Cup final and third consecutive in their 91 years of existence and Olympiacos' twenty-eighth Greek Cup final in their 74-year history. With their victory Olympiacos won the double after 18 years, while Panathinaikos became the first team to lose in a Greek Cup final three times in a row.

== Venue ==
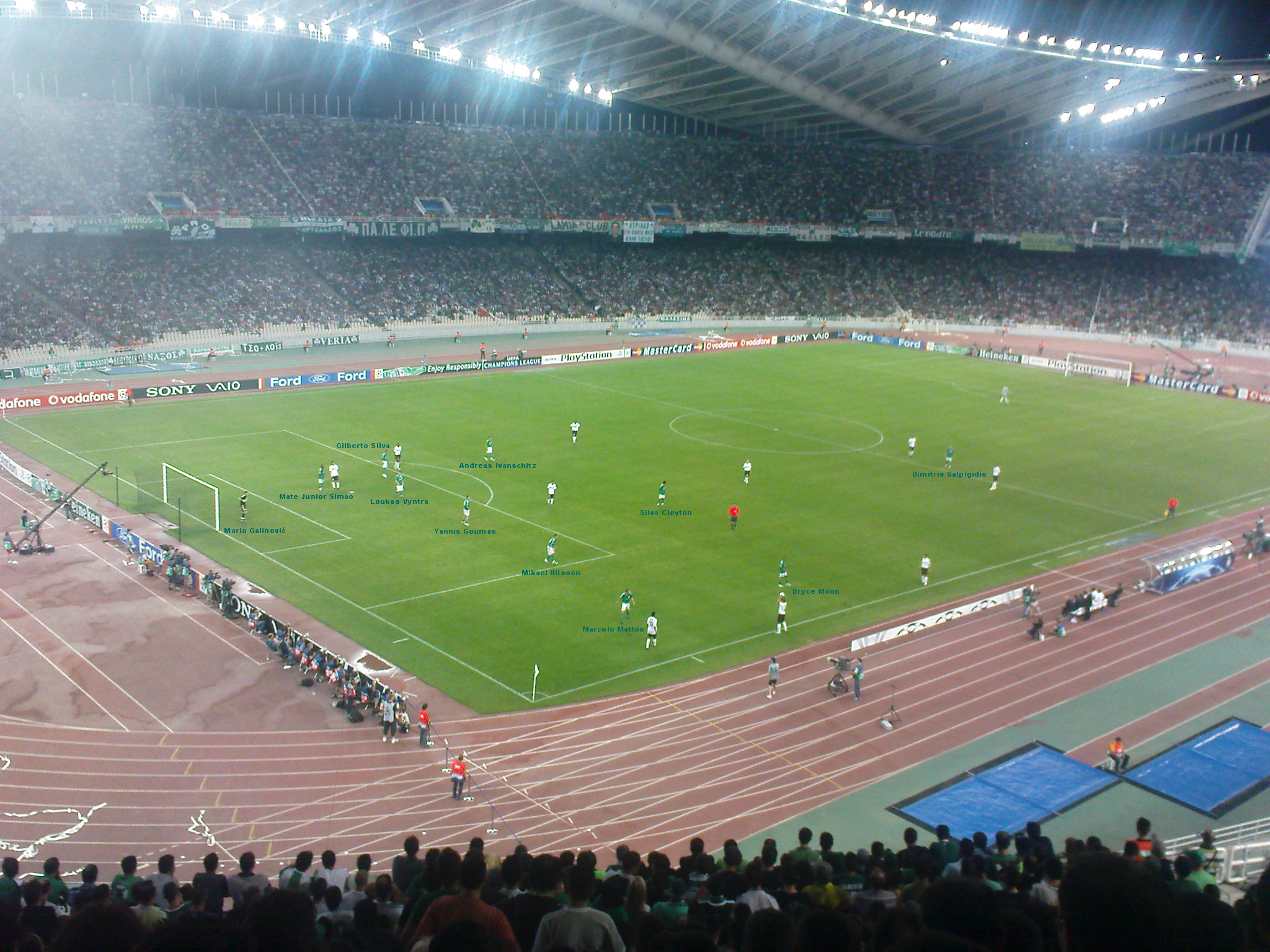
Athens Olympic Stadium.

This was the thirteenth Greek Cup final held at the Athens Olympic Stadium, after the 1983, 1984, 1985, 1986, 1987, 1988, 1989, 1990, 1993, 1994, 1995 and 1996 finals.

The Athens Olympic Stadium was built in 1982. The stadium is used as a venue for Olympiacos, Panathinaikos and Greece and was used for AEK Athens on various occasions. Its current capacity is 80,000 and hosted two European Cup/UEFA Champions League finals in 1983 and 1994, a UEFA Cup Winners' Cup final in 1987 and the 1991 Mediterranean Games.

== Background ==
Panathinaikos had reached the Greek Cup final twenty four times, winning fifteen of them. The last time that they had won the Cup was in 1995 (1–0 against AEK Athens). The last time that they had played in a final was in 1998, where they had lost to Panionios by 1–0.

Olympiacos had reached the Greek Cup final twenty six times, winning nineteen of them. The last time that they had won the Cup was in 1992 (3–1 against PAOK). The last time that they had played in a final was in 1993, where they had lost to Panathinaikos by 1–0.

The two teams had met each other in a Cup final nine times in the 1960, 1962, 1965, 1968, 1969, 1975, 1986, 1988 and 1993 finals.

== Route to the final ==
Panathinaikos				Round	Olympiacos			
Opponent	Agg.	1st leg	2nd leg		Opponent	Agg.	1st leg	2nd leg
Panionios	2–1 (a.e.t.) (A)			First round	Egaleo	4–2 (H)		
Panelefsiniakos	2–1 (H)			Second round	Aris	3–1 (A)		
Paniliakos	2–0 (A)			Round of 16	Ionikos	7–4 (A)		
Panserraikos	5–0	3–0 (A)	2–0 (H)	Quarter-finals	Skoda Xanthi	3–2	3–1 (H)	0–1 (A)
Athinaikos	8–3	6–1 (H)	2–2 (A)	Semi-finals	Iraklis	5–1	4–0 (H)	1–1 (A)

== Match ==
=== Details ===
5 May 1999
21:00 EEST

Panathinaikos	0–2	Olympiacos
	Report	Mavrogenidis 54'; Ofori-Quaye 90'

Olympic Stadium, Marousi
Attendance: 57,783
Referee: Giorgos Douros (Corinthia)

Panathinaikos	Olympiacos

GK	20	(Greece) Antonis Nikopolidis
RB	18	(Greece) Kostas Konstantinidis
CB	8	(Greece) Giannis Goumas
CB	14	(Greece) Leonidas Vokolos
LB	15	(Greece) Angelos Basinas
DM	12	(Norway) Erik Mykland	(yellow card) 45+1'
CM	7	(Croatia) Aljoša Asanović	(yellow card) 59'	(substituted off) 71'
RM	26	(Greece) Giorgos Karagounis
LM	11	(Greece) Andreas Lagonikakis	(yellow card) 20'	(substituted off) 66'
SS	21	(Greece) Nikos Liberopoulos		(substituted off) 81'
CF	9	(Poland) Krzysztof Warzycha (c)
Substitutes:
GK	25	(Greece) Stefanos Kotsolis
DF	2	(Greece) Stratos Apostolakis
DF	5	(Federal Republic of Yugoslavia) Vladan Milojević
MF	23	(Greece) Kostas Kiassos		(substituted on) 66'
MF	19	(Albania) Bledar Kola		(substituted on) 81'
FW	10	(Greece) Alexis Alexoudis		(substituted on) 71'
FW	13	(Poland) Igor Sypniewski
Manager:
(Argentina) Juan Ramón Rocha

GK	31	(Greece) Dimitrios Eleftheropoulos
RB	5	(Greece) Georgios Amanatidis	(yellow card) 23' (yellow-red card) 32'
CB	3	(Greece) Kyriakos Karataidis (c)
CB	32	(Greece) Georgios Anatolakis
LB	14	(Greece) Dimitrios Mavrogenidis
DM	6	(Greece) Ilias Poursanidis
CM	18	(Greece) Vassilis Karapialis	(yellow card) 44'	(substituted off) 82'
RM	11	(Federal Republic of Yugoslavia) Predrag Đorđević
LM	21	(Greece) Grigoris Georgatos
CF	9	(Cyprus) Siniša Gogić		(substituted off) 86'
CF	30	(Greece) Alexis Alexandris		(substituted off) 72'
Substitutes:
GK	1	(Greece) Kyriakos Tochouroglou
DF	19	(Greece) Savvas Poursaitidis
DF	25	(Greece) Paraskevas Antzas		(substituted on) 82'
MF	4	(Greece) Andreas Niniadis		(substituted on) 86'
MF	15	(Greece) Petros Passalis
MF	8	(Brazil) Luciano de Souza
FW	24	(Ghana) Peter Ofori-Quaye		(substituted on) 72'
Manager:
(Bosnia and Herzegovina) Dušan Bajević

Assistant referees:
Panagiotis Milionis (Arcadia)
Panagiotis Nikolaidis (Thessaloniki)
Fourth official:
Giorgos Tsagarakis (Chania)

Match rules

- 90 minutes
- 30 minutes of extra time if necessary
- Penalty shootout if scores still level
- Seven named substitutes
- Maximum of three substitutions

== See also ==
- 1998–99 Greek Football Cup
