= 2000–01 Olympiacos F.C. season =

Olympiacos
2000–01 season
- Chairman: Sokratis Kokkalis
- Manager: Takis Lemonis
- Stadium: Athens Olympic Stadium
- Alpha Ethniki: 1st (champions)
- Greek Cup: Runners-up
- Champions League: Group stage
- UEFA Cup: Third round
- Top goalscorer: League: Alexis Alexandris (20); All: Alexis Alexandris (31)
| Home colours | Away colours | Third colours |

The 2000–01 season was Olympiacos's 42nd consecutive season in the Alpha Ethniki and their 75th year in existence. The club were played their 4th consecutive season in the UEFA Champions League. In the beginning of the summertime Olympiacos named Greek Takis Lemonis coach.

== Players ==
=== First-team squad ===
Squad at end of season

Note: Flags indicate national team as defined under FIFA eligibility rules; some limited exceptions apply. Players may hold more than one non-FIFA nationality.

| No. | Pos. | Nation | Player |
|---|---|---|---|
| 2 | DF | GRE | Christos Patsatzoglou |
| 3 | DF | GRE | Kiriakos Karataidis |
| 4 | MF | GRE | Andreas Niniadis |
| 5 | DF | GRE | Georgios Amanatidis |
| 6 | MF | GRE | Ilias Poursanidis |
| 7 | MF | GRE | Stelios Giannakopoulos |
| 8 | FW | BRA | Luciano de Souza |
| 9 | FW | GRE | Lambros Choutos |
| 10 | FW | BRA | Giovanni |
| 11 | MF | YUG | Predrag Đorđević |
| 13 | MF | BRA | Ze Elias |
| 14 | DF | GRE | Dimitris Mavrogenidis |
| 25 | DF | GRE | Paraskevas Antzas |

| No. | Pos. | Nation | Player |
|---|---|---|---|
| 18 | FW | URU | Gabriel Álvez |
| 19 | DF | GRE | Athanasios Kostoulas |
| 20 | MF | SWE | Pär Zetterberg |
| 21 | DF | GRE | Grigorios Georgatos |
| 23 | DF | GRE | Christos Kontis |
| 24 | FW | GHA | Peter Ofori-Quaye |
| 26 | GK | ITA | Luigi Cennamo |
| 30 | FW | GRE | Alekos Alexandris |
| 31 | GK | GRE | Dimitrios Eleftheropoulos |
| 32 | DF | GRE | Georgios Anatolakis |
| 22 | GK | GRE | Michalis Sifakis |

== Competitions ==
=== Alpha Ethniki ===
==== League table ====
| Pos | Team | Pld | W | D | L | GF | GA | GD | Pts | Qualification or relegation |
|---|---|---|---|---|---|---|---|---|---|---|
| 1 | Olympiacos (C) | 30 | 25 | 3 | 2 | 84 | 22 | +62 | 78 | Qualification for Champions League first group stage |
| 2 | Panathinaikos | 30 | 20 | 6 | 4 | 61 | 20 | +41 | 66 | Qualification for Champions League third qualifying round |
| 3 | AEK Athens | 30 | 19 | 4 | 7 | 61 | 34 | +27 | 61 | Qualification for UEFA Cup qualifying round |
| 4 | PAOK | 30 | 14 | 9 | 7 | 66 | 48 | +18 | 51 | Qualification for UEFA Cup first round (Note: PAOK were qualified for first round of the 2001–02 UEFA Cup as Greek Football Cup winners.) |
| 5 | Iraklis | 30 | 14 | 4 | 12 | 45 | 40 | +5 | 46 | |

Source: Galanis Sports Data
Rules for classification: 1) Points; 2) Head-to-head points; 3) Head-to-head goal difference; 4) Goal difference; 5) Goals scored; 6) Goals against; 7) Play-offs (neutral ground); 8) Draw.
(Note: Criterion 7 is only used if needed to decide champion, teams for relegation or teams for UEFA competitions).
(C) Champions

==== Results summary ====
| Overall | | | | | | | | Home | | | | | | Away | | | | | |
| Pld | W | D | L | GF | GA | GD | Pts | W | D | L | GF | GA | GD | W | D | L | GF | GA | GD |
|---|---|---|---|---|---|---|---|---|---|---|---|---|---|---|---|---|---|---|---|
| 30 | 25 | 3 | 2 | 84 | 22 | +62 | 78 | 14 | 1 | 0 | 47 | 9 | +38 | 11 | 2 | 2 | 37 | 13 | +24 |

Last updated: 27 May 2001.
Source: Competitive matches

==== Results by round ====
| Round | 1 | 2 | 3 | 4 | 5 | 6 | 7 | 8 | 9 | 10 | 11 | 12 | 13 | 14 | 15 | 16 | 17 | 18 | 19 | 20 | 21 | 22 | 23 | 24 | 25 | 26 | 27 | 28 | 29 | 30 |
|---|---|---|---|---|---|---|---|---|---|---|---|---|---|---|---|---|---|---|---|---|---|---|---|---|---|---|---|---|---|---|
| Ground | H | A | H | A | H | A | H | A | H | A | H | A | H | A | H | A | H | A | H | A | H | A | H | A | H | A | H | A | H | A |
| Result | W | W | D | W | W | D | W | W | W | W | W | L | W | W | W | W | W | W | W | W | W | W | W | W | W | W | W | L | W | D |
| Position | 1 | 1 | 1 | 1 | 1 | 1 | 1 | 1 | 1 | 1 | 1 | 1 | 1 | 1 | 1 | 1 | 1 | 1 | 1 | 1 | 1 | 1 | 1 | 1 | 1 | 1 | 1 | 1 | 1 | 1 |

Source: Competitive matches
A = Away; H = Home; W = Win; D = Draw; L = Loss

==== Matches ====
| 16 September 2000 1 | Olympiacos | 6–0 | Ethnikos Asteras | Marousi |
| | Đorđević 38' (pen.); Patsatzoglou 45'; Zetterberg 48'; Giovanni 58'; Triantafyllou 67' (o.g.); Niniadis 84' | | | Stadium: Olympic Stadium; Attendance: 11,019; Referee: Spyros Papadakos |

| 24 September 2000 2 | OFI | 1–2 | Olympiacos | Heraklion |
| | Solís 66' | | Đorđević 45' (pen.); Giannakopoulos 90+1' | Stadium: Theodoros Vardinogiannis Stadium; Attendance: 5,001; Referee: Pantelis Michalakis (Cyprus) |

| 1 October 2000 3 | Olympiacos | 3–3 | Ionikos | Marousi |
| | Choutos 61', 80'; Alexandris 69' | | Afash 34'; Xanthopoulos 72', 90+3' | Stadium: Olympic Stadium; Attendance: 10,766; Referee: Georgios Douros |

| 29 October 2000 4 | Paniliakos | 0–4 | Olympiacos | Pyrgos |
| | | | Niniadis 42', 90+2'; Álvez 68'; Koltzos 76' (o.g.) | Stadium: Pyrgos Stadium; Attendance: 1,644; Referee: Kostas Vallianos |

| 4 November 2000 5 | Olympiacos | 4–1 | AEK Athens | Marousi |
| | Giovanni 19'; Niniadis 52'; Álvez 63'; Đorđević 77' | | Nikolaidis 10' | Stadium: Olympic Stadium; Attendance: 26,138; Referee: Giorgos Tsaggarakis |

| 12 November 2000 6 | Panathinaikos | 0–0 | Olympiacos | Ampelokipoi |
| | | | | Stadium: Leoforos Alexandras Stadium; Attendance: 14,699; Referee: Kyros Vassaras |

| 19 November 2000 7 | Olympiacos | 3–0 | Panachaiki | Marousi |
| | Luciano 3'; Zetterberg 38'; Alexandris 61' | | | Stadium: Olympic Stadium; Attendance: 3,277; Referee: Christos Daglis |

| 27 November 2000 8 | PAOK | 2–4 | Olympiacos | Thessaloniki |
| | Nalitzis 56'; Frousos 68' | | Georgatos 32'; Alexandris 66'; Đorđević 75', 90+3' | Stadium: Toumba Stadium; Attendance: 5,723; Referee: Georgios Kasnaferis |

| 3 December 2000 9 | Olympiacos | 5–2 | Kalamata | Rhodes |
| | Giovanni 5', 21', 87'; Niniadis 72'; Alexandris 85' | | Troupkos 63' (pen.); Soares 90+1' | Stadium: Diagoras Stadium; Attendance: 3,141; Referee: Stavros Flotsios |

| 11 December 2000 10 | Skoda Xanthi | 0–3 | Olympiacos | Xanthi |
| | | | Ofori-Quaye 24'; Đorđević 61'; Álvez 76' | Stadium: A.O. Xanthi Stadium; Attendance: 3,257; Referee: Manolis Giannadakis |

| 17 December 2000 11 | Olympiacos | 3–1 | PAS Giannina | Rhodes |
| | Alexandris 24'; Đorđević 60' (pen.); Georgatos 83' | | Élder 54' | Stadium: Diagoras Stadium; Attendance: 1,733; Referee: Vangelis Tsigras |

| 3 January 2001 12 | Iraklis | 2–1 | Olympiacos | Thessaloniki |
| | Konstantinou 66', 83' | | Alexandris 58' | Stadium: Kaftanzoglio Stadium; Attendance: 9,050; Referee: Georgios Douros |

| 7 January 2001 13 | Olympiacos | 2–0 | Panionios | Marousi |
| | Alexandris 31'; Ofori-Quaye 45' | | | Stadium: Olympic Stadium; Attendance: 8,134; Referee: Paraskevas Chelis |

| 15 January 2001 14 | Athinaikos | 1–5 | Olympiacos | Vyronas |
| | Zafirakis 44' | | Giannakopoulos 3'; Alexandris 45', 50'; Đorđević 48' (pen.); Giovanni 66' | Stadium: Vyronas National Stadium; Attendance: 1,223; Referee: Georgios Borovilos |

| 21 January 2001 15 | Olympiacos | 4–1 | Aris | Marousi |
| | Giannakopoulos 15', 71'; Ofori-Quaye 39'; Alexandris 68' | | Kyzeridis 48' | Stadium: Olympic Stadium; Attendance: 11,077; Referee: Paraskevas Chelis |

| 28 January 2001 16 | Ethnikos Asteras | 0–1 | Olympiacos | Kaisariani |
| | | | Niniadis 58' | Stadium: Michalis Kritikopoulos Stadium; Attendance: 4,000; Referee: Dimitris Pontikis |

| 3 February 2001 17 | Olympiacos | 5–0 | OFI | Marousi |
| | Anatolakis 6'; Alexandris 19'; Giannakopoulos 42'; Georgatos 54'; Đorđević 63' | | | Stadium: Olympic Stadium; Attendance: 10,923; Referee: Georgios Borovilos |

| 11 February 2001 18 | Ionikos | 0–1 | Olympiacos | Piraeus |
| | | | Đorđević 62' | Stadium: Neapoli Stadium; Attendance: 2,830; Referee: Georgios Kasnaferis |

| 18 February 2001 19 | Olympiacos | 2–0 | Paniliakos | Marousi |
| | Giannakopoulos 30'; Đorđević 90+4' | | | Stadium: Olympic Stadium; Attendance: Thanasis Briakos; Referee: 8,508 |

| 26 February 2001 20 | AEK Athens | 1–2 | Olympiacos | Heraklion |
| | Tsiartas 36' | | Giannakopoulos 19'; Đorđević 28' | Stadium: Theodoros Vardinogiannis Stadium; Attendance: 4,836; Referee: Paraskevas Chelis |

| 4 March 2001 21 | Olympiacos | 1–0 | Panathinaikos | Marousi |
| | Đorđević 68' | | | Stadium: Olympic Stadium; Attendance: 29,048; Referee: Georgios Borovilos |

| 11 March 2001 22 | Panachaiki | 1–5 | Olympiacos | Patras |
| | Vukčević 86' | | Giovanni 45'; Mavrogenidis 55'; Alexandris 57', 74'; Giannakopoulos 83' | Stadium: Kostas Davourlis Stadium; Attendance: 3,869; Referee: Kostas Vallianos |

| 17 March 2001 23 | Olympiacos | 1–0 | PAOK | Marousi |
| 19:00 | Anatolakis 34' | | | Stadium: Olympic Stadium; Attendance: 12,925; Referee: Paraskevas Chelis |

| 31 March 2001 24 | Kalamata | 0–1 | Olympiacos | Kalamata |
| | | | Alexandris 11' | Stadium: Kalamata Municipal Stadium; Attendance: 2,453; Referee: Kyros Vassaras |

| 8 April 2001 25 | Olympiacos | 4–0 | Skoda Xanthi | Marousi |
| | Giannakopoulos 17', 66'; Alexandris 32'; Đorđević 59' | | | Stadium: Olympic Stadium; Attendance: 7,849; Referee: Christos Daglis |

| 22 April 2001 26 | PAS Giannina | 1–5 | Olympiacos | Ioannina |
| | Kebadze 71' | | Georgatos 4' (pen.); Zetterberg 8'; Alexandris 78', 84', 89' | Stadium: Zosimades Stadium; Attendance: 6,193; Referee: Georgios Tsagarakis |

| 30 April 2001 27 | Olympiacos | 3–1 | Iraklis | Marousi |
| | Alexandris 51'; Choutos 78'; Giannakopoulos 90+1' | | Konstantinou 42' | Stadium: Olympic Stadium; Attendance: 4,849; Referee: Christoforos Zografos |

| 6 May 2001 28 | Panionios | 2–1 | Olympiacos | Nea Smyrni |
| | Kafalis 74', 88' | | Patsatzoglou 47' | Stadium: Nea Smyrni Stadium; Attendance: 3,509; Referee: Paraskevas Chelis |

| 20 May 2001 29 | Olympiacos | 1–0 | Athinaikos | Marousi |
| | Alexandris 38' | | | Stadium: Olympic Stadium; Attendance: 30,450; Referee: Manolis Giannadakis |

| 27 May 2001 30 | Aris | 2–2 | Olympiacos | Thessaloniki |
| | Christodoulou 25'; Theodoridis 35' | | Zetterberg 37'; Georgatos 69' (pen.) | Stadium: Kleanthis Vikelidis Stadium; Attendance: 3,119; Referee: Makis Efthimiadis |

=== Greek Cup ===
==== Group 5 ====
| Pos | Team | Pld | W | D | L | GF | GA | GD | Pts | Qualification | OLY | EGA | ETA | TRI | PTR | ASA |
|---|---|---|---|---|---|---|---|---|---|---|---|---|---|---|---|---|
| 1 | Olympiacos | 10 | 9 | 0 | 1 | 39 | 9 | +30 | 27 | Round of 16 | | 4–1 | 5–0 | 4–0 | 4–0 | 7–0 |
| 2 | Egaleo | 10 | 8 | 0 | 2 | 23 | 10 | +13 | 24 | Round of 16 | 3–0 | | 4–0 | 3–0 | 5–2 | 1–0 |
| 3 | Ethnikos Asteras | 10 | 6 | 0 | 4 | 20 | 19 | +1 | 18 | | 1–4 | 2–0 | | 6–0 | 3–1 | 3–2 |
| 4 | Trikala | 10 | 4 | 0 | 6 | 12 | 22 | −10 | 12 | | 3–5 | 0–1 | 2–1 | | 2–1 | 0–1 |
| 5 | Patraikos | 10 | 1 | 1 | 8 | 11 | 28 | −17 | 4 | | 1–4 | 1–2 | 1–2 | 0–3 | | 1–1 |
| 6 | Anagennisi Karditsa | 10 | 1 | 1 | 8 | 7 | 24 | −17 | 4 | | 0–2 | 1–3 | 0–2 | 0–2 | 2–3 | |

Source: epo.gr

===== Matches =====
| 6 August 2000 Matchday 1 | Olympiacos | 4–0 | Patraikos | Marousi |
| 13:00 EEST | Giannakopoulos 1'; Álvez 30'; Đorđević 42'; Choutos 90' | Report (page 24) | | Stadium: Olympic Stadium; Referee: Stavros Flotsios (Boeotia) |

| 17 August 2000 Matchday 2 | Anagennisi Karditsa | 0–2 | Olympiacos | Karditsa |
| 13:00 EEST | | Report (page 24-25) | Álvez 13'; Giovanni 39' | Stadium: Municipal Stadium of Karditsa; Referee: Panagiotis Nikou (Imathia) |

| 12 August 2000 Matchday 3 | Ethnikos Asteras | 1–4 | Olympiacos | Kaisariani |
| 13:00 EEST | Tešović 65' | Report (page 25) | Luciano 30'; Choutos 38', 86'; Ofori-Quaye 72' | Stadium: Michalis Kritikopoulos Stadium; Referee: Manolis Giannadakis (Lasithi) |

| 4 October 2000 Matchday 4 | Olympiacos | 4–1 | Egaleo | Marousi |
| 13:00 EEST | Álvez 10', 19'; Giannakopoulos 35'; Luciano 67' | Report (page 26) | Manousakis 38' | Stadium: Olympic Stadium; Referee: Kyros Vassaras (Thessaloniki) |

| 23 August 2000 Matchday 5 | Trikala | 3–5 | Olympiacos | Trikala |
| 13:00 EEST | Wellington 28', 47'; Odair 37' | Report (pages 26-27) | Giovanni 15', 71', 76'; Ofori-Quaye 32'; Alexandris 34' | Stadium: Trikala Municipal Stadium; Referee: Thanasis Briakos (Epirus) |

| 31 August 2000 Matchday 6 | Patraikos | 1–4 | Olympiacos | Patras |
| 13:00 EEST | Dragaš 44' | Report (page 27) | Anatolakis 4'; Álvez 58'; Luciano 78'; Alexandris 86' | Stadium: Prosfygika Stadium; Referee: Giorgos Kasnaferis (Athens) |

| 3 September 2000 Matchday 7 | Olympiacos | 7–0 | Anagennisi Karditsa | Marousi |
| 13:00 EEST | Zé Elias 12'; Giovanni 35', 89'; Anatolakis 49'; Alexandris 64', 72'; Luciano 87' | Report (page 27-28) | | Stadium: Olympic Stadium; Referee: Dimitris Pontikis (Thessaloniki) |

| 30 November 2000 Matchday 8 | Olympiacos | 5–0 | Ethnikos Asteras | Patras |
| 13:00 EET | Choutos 14'; Niniadis 29'; Castillo 60'; Alexandris 79', 90' | Report (page 28) | | Stadium: Kostas Davourlis Stadium; Referee: Dimitris Pontikis (Thessaloniki) |

| 14 December 2000 Matchday 9 | Egaleo | 3–0 | Olympiacos | Aigaleo |
| 13:00 EET | Rusev 30'; Makris 47', 49' | Report (page 29) | | Stadium: Stavros Mavrothalassitis Stadium |

| 8 October 2000 Matchday 10 | Olympiacos | 4–0 | Trikala | Marousi |
| 13:00 EEST | Álvez 9', 34'; Alexandris 43'; Giannakopoulos 73' | Report (page 29) | | Stadium: Olympic Stadium; Referee: Paraskevas Chelis (Kavala) |

==== Round of 16 ====
| 10 January 2001 First leg | AEK Athens | 0–2 (Awarded) | Olympiacos | Nea Filadelfeia |
| 20:00 EET | Nikolaidis 46' | Report (page 48) | Niniadis 67' | Stadium: Nikos Goumas Stadium; Attendance: 14,062; Referee: Dimitris Pontikis (Thessaloniki) |
Note: Match abandoned at the 73rd minute while the game was at 1–1. It was awarded 0–2 to Olympiacos.

| 24 January 2001 Second leg | Olympiacos | 6–1 (8–1 agg.) | AEK Athens | Marousi |
| 20:00 EET | Georgatos 5'; Giovanni 21', 32'; Ofori-Quaye 52'; Álvez 79'; Giannakopoulos 83' | Report (page 50) | Maladenis 24' | Stadium: Olympic Stadium; Attendance: 11,925; Referee: Makis Efthimiadis (Drama) |

==== Quarter-finals ====
| 7 February 2001 First leg | Olympiacos | 1–1 | Panathinaikos | Marousi |
| 20:00 EET | Đorđević 27' (pen.) | Report (page 50) | Liberopoulos 88' | Stadium: Olympic Stadium; Attendance: 42,845; Referee: Giorgos Tsangarakis (Chania) |

| 21 March 2001 Second leg | Panathinaikos | 1–4 (2–5 agg.) | Olympiacos | Ampelokipoi |
| 20:00 EET | Liberopoulos 43' | Report (page 51) | Alexandris 5'; Luciano 9'; Georgatos 61' (pen.); Giovanni 84' | Stadium: Leoforos Alexandras Stadium; Attendance: 12,759; Referee: Thanasis Briakos (Epirus) |

==== Semi-finals ====
| 4 April 2001 First leg | Iraklis | 0–1 | Olympiacos | Thessaloniki |
| 19:00 EEST | | Report (page 52) | Alexandris 3' | Stadium: Kaftanzoglio Stadium; Attendance: 9,382; Referee: Giorgos Borovilos (Arcadia) |

| 11 April 2001 Second leg | Olympiacos | 5–4 (6–4 agg.) | Iraklis | Marousi |
| 19:00 EEST | Đorđević 10' (pen.); Zé Elias 52'; Giovanni 56', 90'; Choutos 80' | Report (page 52) | Haxhi 1'; Konstantinou 37', 76'; Gojković 61' | Stadium: Olympic Stadium; Attendance: 13,243; Referee: Panagiotis Nikou (Imathia) |

==== Final ====
| 12 May 2001 Final | Olympiacos | 2–4 | PAOK | Nea Filadelfeia |
| 21:00 EEST | Đorđević 78' (pen.); Choutos 90+2' | Report (page 52) | Engomitis 4'; Borbokis 31'; Georgiadis 46'; Nalitzis 85' | Stadium: Nikos Goumas Stadium; Attendance: 13,300; Referee: Giorgos Kasnaferis (Athens) |

=== UEFA Champions League ===
==== Group stage ====
| Pos | Team | Pld | W | D | L | GF | GA | GD | Pts | Qualification |
|---|---|---|---|---|---|---|---|---|---|---|
| 1 | (Spain) Valencia | 6 | 4 | 1 | 1 | 7 | 4 | +3 | 13 | Advance to second group stage |
| 2 | (France) Lyon | 6 | 3 | 0 | 3 | 8 | 6 | +2 | 9 | Advance to second group stage |
| 3 | (Greece) Olympiacos | 6 | 3 | 0 | 3 | 6 | 5 | +1 | 9 | Transfer to UEFA Cup |
| 4 | (Netherlands) Heerenveen | 6 | 1 | 1 | 4 | 3 | 9 | −6 | 4 | |

Source: UEFA

All times at CET

| 12 September 2000 1 | Valencia (Spain) | 2–1 | (Greece) Olympiacos | Valencia, Spain |
| 20:45 | Baraja 36'; Diego Alonso 45' | Report | Đorđević 74' | Stadium: Mestalla Stadium; Attendance: 44,000; Referee: Anders Frisk (Sweden) |

| 20 September 2000 2 | Olympiacos (Greece) | 2–1 | (France) Lyon | Athens, Greece |
| 20:45 | Ofori-Quaye 19'; Giovanni 34' | Report | Foé 88' | Stadium: Olympic Stadium; Attendance: 69,048; Referee: Graham Poll (England) |

| 27 September 2000 3 | Olympiacos (Greece) | 2–0 | (Netherlands) Heerenveen | Athens, Greece |
| 20:45 | Giovanni 52', 69' | Report | | Stadium: Olympic Stadium; Attendance: 52,000; Referee: Claus Bo Larsen (Denmark) |

| 17 October 2000 4 | Heerenveen (Netherlands) | 1–0 | (Greece) Olympiacos | Heerenveen, Netherlands |
| 20:45 | Jensen 83' | Report | | Stadium: Abe Lenstra Stadion; Attendance: 13,500; Referee: Hartmut Strampe (Germany) |

| 25 October 2000 5 | Olympiacos (Greece) | 1–0 | (Spain) Valencia | Athens, Greece |
| 20:45 | Đorđević 65' (pen.) | Report | | Stadium: Olympic Stadium; Attendance: 50,359; Referee: Alfredo Trentalange (Italy) |

| 7 November 2000 6 | Lyon (France) | 1–0 | (Greece) Olympiacos | Lyon, France |
| 20:45 | Laigle 2' | Report | | Stadium: Stade de Gerland; Attendance: 37,908; Referee: Günter Benkö (Austria) |

=== UEFA Cup ===
==== Third round ====
All times at CET

| 23 November 2000 First leg | Olympiacos (Greece) | 2–2 | (England) Liverpool | Athens, Greece |
| | Alexandris 65', 90' | Report | Barmby 38'; Gerrard 66' | Stadium: Olympic Stadium; Attendance: 43,855; Referee: René Temmink (Netherlands) |

| 7 December 2000 Second leg | Liverpool (England) | 2–0 (4–2 agg.) | (Greece) Olympiacos | Liverpool, England |
| | Heskey 28'; Barmby 60' | Report | | Stadium: Anfield; Attendance: 35,484; Referee: Vítor Melo Pereira (Portugal) |

== Team kit ==
Supplier: Umbro
Sponsor(s): Siemens Mobile

| Home | Away | Third | Fourth |

Source: Olympiacos FC
