= 2001 Greek Football Cup final =

2001 Greek Cup final
- Event: 2000–01 Greek Football Cup
Olympiacos	PAOK
2	4
- Date: 12 May 2001
- Venue: Nikos Goumas Stadium, Nea Filadelfia, Athens
- Man of the Match: Panagiotis Engomitis (PAOK)
- Referee: Giorgos Kasnaferis (Athens)
- Attendance: 13,300
- Weather: Mostly Cloudy; 14 °C (57 °F); 72% humidity

The 2001 Greek Cup final was the 57th final of the Greek Cup. The match took place on 12 May 2001 at Nikos Goumas Stadium. The contesting teams were Olympiacos and PAOK. It was Olympiacos' twenty-ninth Greek Cup final in their 76 years of existence and PAOK's fifteenth Greek Cup final in their 75-year history. A draw was preceded on 19 April to determine in which stadium/city the final would be hosted: Nikos Goumas Stadium in Athens or Kaftanzoglio Stadium in Thessaloniki. Several days before the game, Olympiacos president Sokratis Kokkalis made a memorable statement using a Greek expression that Olympiacos would lose the upcoming final only if "the devil broke his leg", meaning that it was almost impossible for his team to lose. However, PAOK won the match by 4–2 with an impressive performance and earned the trophy 27 years after their last success, in the same stadium and against the same opponent. During the awarding ceremony, former goalkeeper and member of the coaching staff of PAOK, Mladen Furtula whispered to Kokkalis that the devil indeed broke his leg that day and the latter responded with a laugh. The manager of PAOK, Dušan Bajević became the first in history to win the trophy with three different clubs, as he had previously won it in 1996 with AEK Athens and in 1999 with Olympiacos.

== Venue ==
This was the eighth Greek Cup final held at Nikos Goumas Stadium, after the 1962, 1967, 1974, 1976, 1980, 1981 and 1982 finals.

Nikos Goumas Stadium was built in 1930 and it has been renovated twice, in 1979 and 1998. The stadium is used as a venue for AEK Athens and was used for Greece on various occasions. Its current capacity is 28,729.

== Background ==
Olympiacos had reached the Greek Cup final twenty seven times, winning twenty of them. The last time that they had played in a final was in 1999, where they had won against Panathinaikos by 2–0.

PAOK had reached the Greek Cup final fourteen times, winning two of them. The last time that they had won the Cup was in 1974 (4–3 on penalties, which came after a 2–2 draw at the end of the extra time against Olympiacos). The last time that they had played in a final was in 1992, where they had lost to Olympiacos by 3–1 on aggregate (1–1 at Toumba Stadium and 2–0 at Karaiskakis Stadium).

The two teams had met each other in a Cup final six times in the 1951, 1971, 1973, 1974, 1981 and 1992 finals.

== Route to the final ==
Olympiacos				Round	PAOK			
Opponent	Result			Group stage	Opponent	Result		
Patraikos	4–0 (H)			Matchday 1	Atromitos	1–0 (H)		
Anagennisi Karditsa	2–0 (A)			Matchday 2	A.S. Ampelokipoi	6–1 (A)		
Ethnikos Asteras	4–1 (A)			Matchday 3	Kavala	5–1 (A)		
Egaleo	4–1 (H)			Matchday 4	Panachaiki	2–0 (H)		
Trikala	5–3 (A)			Matchday 5	Nafpaktiakos Asteras	3–3 (A)		
Patraikos	4–1 (A)			Matchday 6	Atromitos	2–1 (A)		
Anagennisi Karditsa	7–0 (H)			Matchday 7	A.S. Ampelokipoi	6–1 (H)		
Ethnikos Asteras	5–0 (H)			Matchday 8	Kavala	3–1 (H)		
Egaleo	0–3 (A)			Matchday 9	Panachaiki	3–2 (A)		
Trikala	4–0 (H)			Matchday 10	Nafpaktiakos Asteras	4–0 (H)		
Group 5 winners: Pos / Team / Pld / Pts; 1 / Olympiacos / 10 / 27; 2 / Egaleo / 10 / 24; 3 / Ethnikos Asteras / 10 / 18; 4 / Trikala / 10 / 12; 5 / Patraikos / 10 / 4; 6 / Anagennisi Karditsa / 10 / 4; Source: epo.gr				Final standings	Group 4 winners: Pos / Team / Pld / Pts; 1 / PAOK / 10 / 28; 2 / Panachaiki / 10 / 17; 3 / Kavala / 10 / 14; 4 / Atromitos / 10 / 11; 5 / Nafpaktiakos Asteras / 10 / 10; 6 / A.S. Ampelokipoi / 10 / 4; Source: epo.gr			
Opponent	Agg.	1st leg	2nd leg	Knockout phase	Opponent	Agg.	1st leg	2nd leg
Bye				Additional round	Bye			
AEK Athens	8–1	2–0 (w/o) (A)	6–1 (H)	Round of 16	Aris	3–1	1–1 (A)	2–0 (H)
Panathinaikos	5–2	1–1 (H)	4–1 (A)	Quarter-finals	Skoda Xanthi	4–1	2–0 (H)	2–1 (A)
Iraklis	6–4	1–0 (A)	5–4 (H)	Semi-finals	Apollon Athens	5–3	5–2 (H)	0–1 (A)

== Match ==
=== Details ===
12 May 2001
21:00 EEST

Olympiacos	2–4	PAOK
Đorđević 78' (pen.); Choutos 90+2'	Report (page 52)	Engomitis 4'; Borbokis 31'; Georgiadis 46'; Nalitzis 85'

Nikos Goumas Stadium, Nea Filadelfia
Attendance: 13,300
Referee: Giorgos Kasnaferis (Athens)

Olympiacos	PAOK

GK	31	(Greece) Dimitrios Eleftheropoulos
RB	14	(Greece) Dimitrios Mavrogenidis		(substituted off) 46'
CB	19	(Greece) Athanasios Kostoulas
CB	32	(Greece) Georgios Anatolakis	(yellow card) 36'
LB	21	(Greece) Grigoris Georgatos	(yellow card) 69'	(substituted off) 69'
DM	13	(Brazil) Zé Elias
CM	4	(Greece) Andreas Niniadis		(substituted off) 46'
RM	7	(Greece) Stelios Giannakopoulos
LM	11	(Federal Republic of Yugoslavia) Predrag Đorđević
SS	10	(Brazil) Giovanni
CF	30	(Greece) Alexis Alexandris (c)
Substitutes:
GK	1	(Greece) Angelos Georgiou
DF	2	(Greece) Christos Patsatzoglou		(substituted on) 46'
DF	3	(Greece) Kyriakos Karataidis
MF	6	(Greece) Ilias Poursanidis
MF	8	(Brazil) Luciano		(substituted on) 69'
MF	20	(Sweden) Pär Zetterberg
FW	9	(Greece) Lampros Choutos		(substituted on) 46'
Manager:
(Greece) Takis Lemonis

GK	16	(Australia) Ante Čović
RB	2	(Greece) Vasilios Borbokis
CB	19	(Ghana) Koffi Amponsah		(substituted off) 46'
CB	4	(Greece) Anastasios Katsabis (c)
CB	24	(Nigeria) Ifeanyi Udeze	(yellow card) 88'
LB	3	(Greece) Stylianos Venetidis	(yellow card) 51'
CM	28	(Greece) Pantelis Kafes
RM	30	(Cyprus) Panagiotis Engomitis	(yellow card) 29'
LM	11	(Greece) Pantelis Konstantinidis
CF	21	(Greece) Giorgos Georgiadis		(substituted off) 79'
CF	22	(Cyprus) Ioannis Okkas	(yellow card) 62'	(substituted off) 90'
Substitutes:
GK	26	(Greece) Apostolos Papadopoulos
DF	14	(Greece) Loukas Karadimos
DF	23	(Greece) Dionysis Chasiotis
DF	25	(Greece) Georgios Koulakiotis		(substituted on) 46'
MF	42	(Cameroon) Guy Feutchine
FW	8	(Federal Republic of Yugoslavia) Slađan Spasić		(substituted on) 90'
FW	20	(Greece) Dimitris Nalitzis		(substituted on) 79'
Manager:
(Bosnia and Herzegovina) Dušan Bajević

Man of the Match:
(Cyprus) Panagiotis Engomitis (PAOK)

Assistant referees:
Andreas Zisis (Corinthia)
Apostolos Kourkounas (Chania)

Match rules

- 90 minutes
- 30 minutes of extra time if necessary
- Penalty shootout if scores still level
- Seven named substitutes
- Maximum of three substitutions

== See also ==
- 2000–01 Greek Football Cup
