= 1992 Greek Super Cup =

| AEK Athens | Olympiacos |
| 1 | 3 |
- Date: 29 August 1992
- Venue: Olympic Stadium, Marousi, Athens
- Referee: Vassilios Nikakis (Aetoloacarnania)
- Attendance: 29,371

The 1992 Greek Super Cup was the 5th edition of the Greek Super Cup, an association football match contested by the winners of the previous season's Alpha Ethniki and Greek Cup competitions. The match took place on 29 August 1992 at the Athens Olympic Stadium. The contesting teams were the 1991–92 Alpha Ethniki champions, AEK Athens and the 1991–92 Greek Cup winners, Olympiacos. Olympiacos won the match 3–1.

== Venue ==
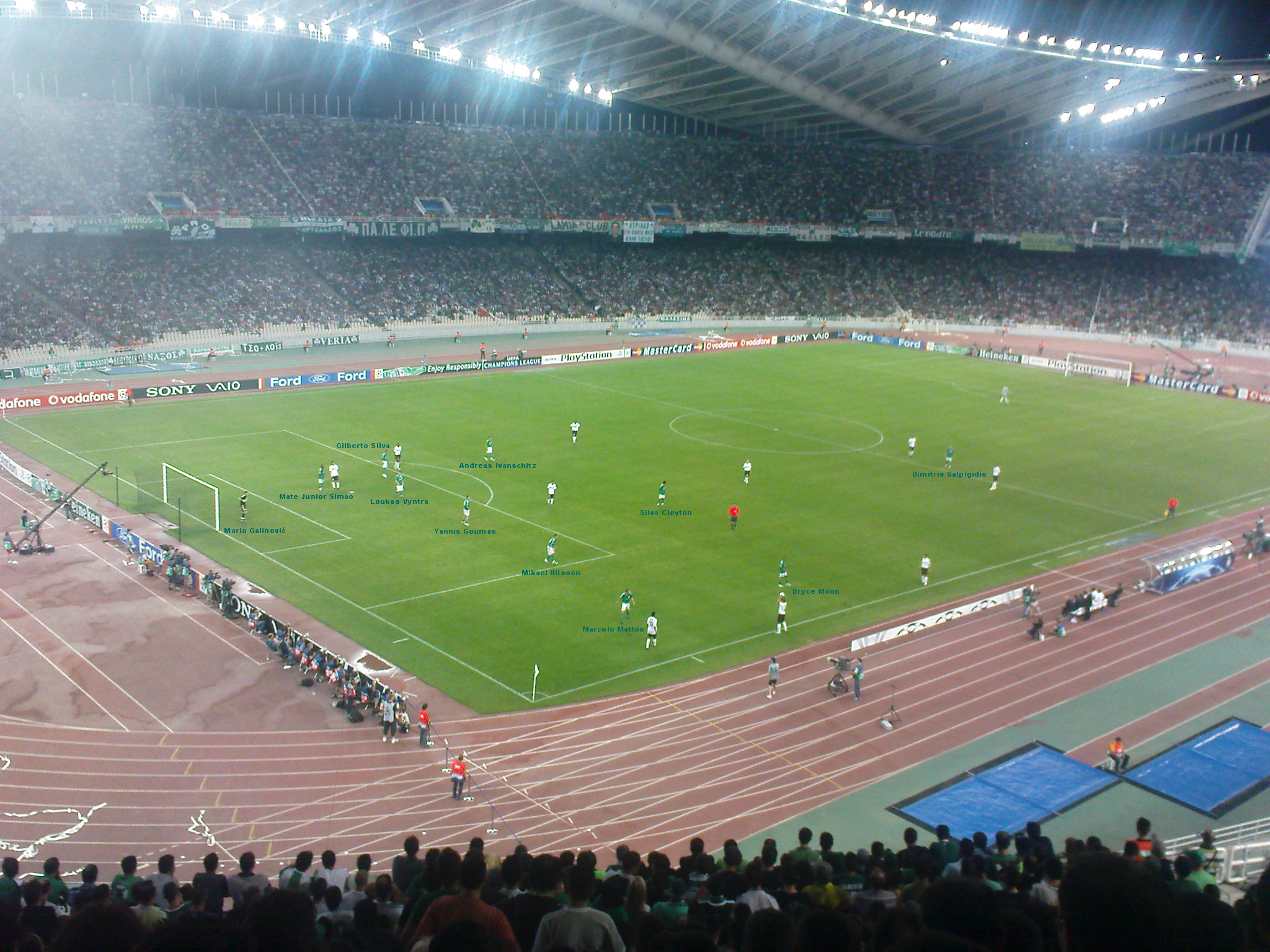
Athens Olympic Stadium.

This was the fourth Greek Super Cup held at the Athens Olympic Stadium, after 1987, 1988 and 1989.

The Athens Olympic Stadium was built in 1982. The stadium is used as a venue for Panathinaikos and Greece and was used for Olympiacos and AEK Athens in various occasions. Its current capacity is 80,000 and hosted a European Cup/UEFA Champions League final in 1983, a European Cup Winners' Cup final in 1987 and the 1991 Mediterranean Games.

== Background ==
AEK Athens participated in the Greek Super Cup one time in 1989, where they had won Panathinaikos 6–5 on penalties, which came after a 1–1 draw at the end of the extra time.

Olympiacos participated in the Greek Super Cup two times, winning all of them. The last time that they had played in the Super Cup was in 1987, where they had won OFI by 1–0.

The two teams had never met each other in the Super Cup.

== Match ==
=== Details ===
29 August 1992
21:00 EEST (UTC+3)

| AEK Athens | 1–3 | Olympiacos |
|---|---|---|
| Alexandris 31' | Report | Batista 34'; Tsalouchidis 54'; Karapialis 60' |

Olympic Stadium, Marousi
Attendance: 29,371
Referee: Vassilios Nikakis (Aetoloacarnania)

| AEK Athens | Olympiacos |

| GK | 1 | (Greece) Ilias Atmatsidis |
| RB | 6 | (Greece) Pavlos Papaioannou |
| CB | 4 | (Greece) Stelios Manolas (c) | (yellow card) 33' |
| CB | 3 | (Greece) Vaios Karagiannis |
| LB | 2 | (Greece) Christos Vasilopoulos |
| DM | 5 | (Federal Republic of Yugoslavia) Refik Šabanadžović |
| CM | 11 | (Australia) Jim Patikas | | (substituted off) 63' |
| CM | 8 | (North Macedonia) Toni Savevski |
| RW | 7 | (Greece) Alexis Alexandris |
| LW | 10 | (Croatia) Zoran Slišković |
| CF | 9 | (Greece) Vasilis Dimitriadis |
Substitutes:
| GK | 15 | (Greece) Antonis Minou |
| DF | 14 | (Greece) Georgios Agorogiannis |
| DF | 16 | (Greece) Takis Karagiozopoulos |
| MF | 12 | (Greece) Tasos Mitropoulos | | (substituted on) 63' |
Manager:
(Bosnia and Herzegovina) Dušan Bajević

| GK | 1 | (Greece) Georgios Mirtsos |
| RB | 2 | (Greece) Theodoros Pachatouridis | (yellow card) 21' |
| CB | 3 | (Greece) Kyriakos Karataidis |
| CB | 4 | (Greece) Georgios Mitsibonas |
| LB | 5 | (Greece) Michalis Kousoulas |
| DM | 7 | (Ukraine) Hennadiy Lytovchenko |
| CM | 6 | (Greece) Panagiotis Tsalouchidis (c) |
| CM | 10 | (Greece) Vassilis Karapialis | (yellow card) 44' |
| RW | 8 | (Greece) Nikos Tsiantakis | | (substituted off) 80' |
| LW | 11 | (Greece) Daniel Batista | | (substituted off) 60' |
| CF | 9 | (Ukraine) Oleh Protasov |
Substitutes:
| DF | 13 | (Greece) Michalis Vlachos | | (substituted on) 80' |
| MF | 14 | (Greece) Ilias Savvidis | | (substituted on) 60' |
Manager:
(Ukraine) Oleg Blokhin

Match rules

- 90 minutes
- 30 minutes of extra time if necessary
- Penalty shootout if scores still level
- Five named substitutes
- Maximum of two substitutions
