= 1986 Greek Football Cup final =

1986 Greek Cup final
- Event: 1985–86 Greek Football Cup
| Panathinaikos | Olympiacos |
| 4 | 0 |
- Date: 28 May 1986
- Venue: Olympic Stadium, Marousi, Athens
- Referee: Kostas Dimitriadis (Piraeus)
- Attendance: 72,948

The 1986 Greek Cup final was the 42nd final of the Greek Cup. The match took place on 28 May 1986 at the Olympic Stadium. The contesting teams were Panathinaikos and Olympiacos. It was Panathinaikos' sixteenth Greek Cup final in their 78 years of existence and Olympiacos' twenty-third Greek Cup final in their 61-year history.

== Venue ==
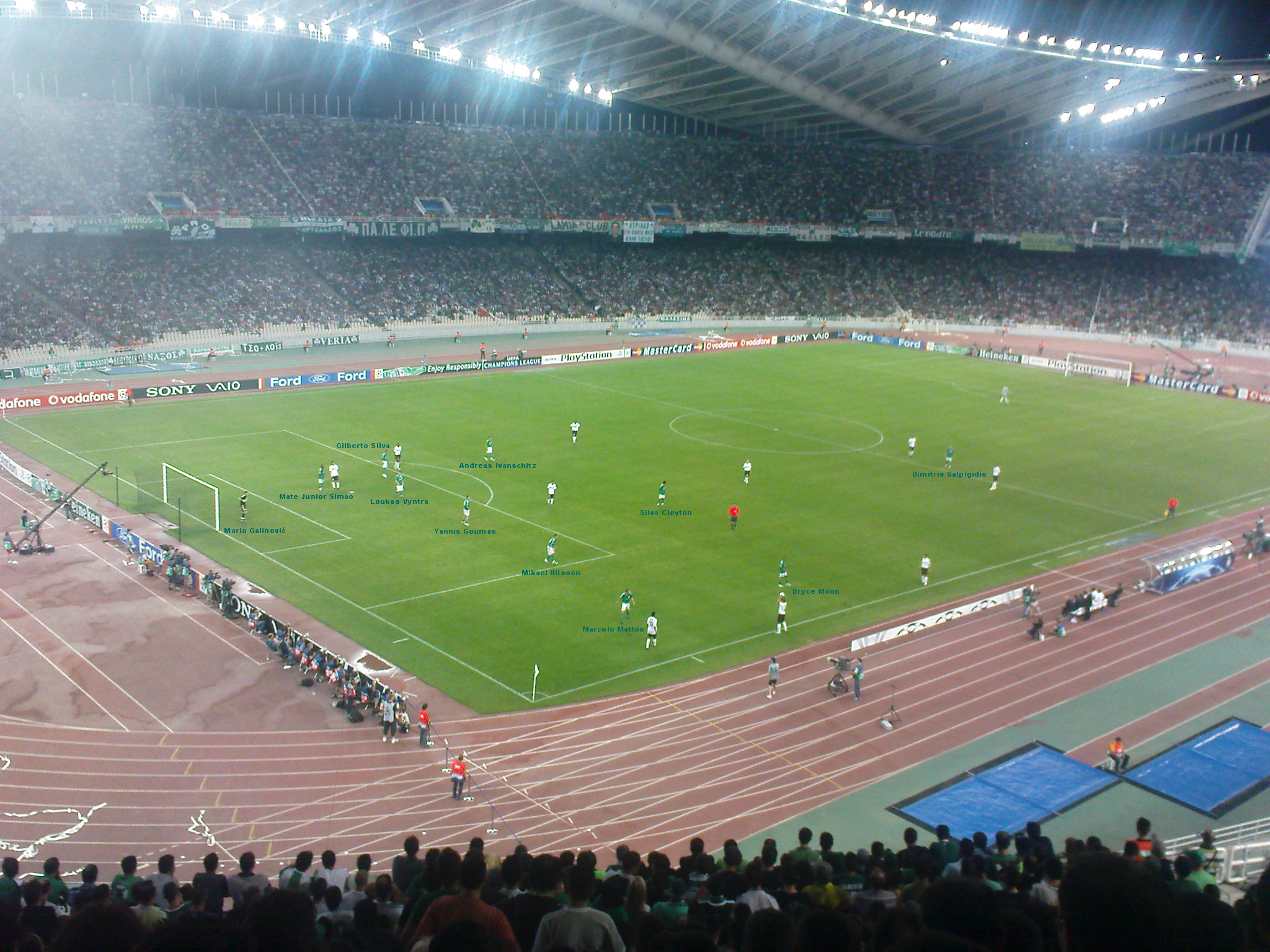
Athens Olympic Stadium.

This was the fourth Greek Cup final held at the Athens Olympic Stadium, after the 1983, 1984 and 1985 finals.

The Athens Olympic Stadium was built in 1982. The stadium is used as a venue for Panathinaikos, Olympiacos, AEK Athens and Greece. Its current capacity is 80,000 and hosted a European Cup final in 1983.

== Background ==
Panathinaikos had reached the Greek Cup final fifteen times, winning eight of them. The last time that they played in a final was in 1984, where they had won against AEL by 2–0.

Olympiacos had reached the Greek Cup final twenty two times, winning seventeen of them. The last time that they played in a final was in 1981, where they had won against PAOK by 3–1.

The two teams had met each other in a Cup final six times in the 1960, 1962, 1965, 1968, 1969 and 1975 finals.

== Route to the final ==
| Panathinaikos | | | | Round | Olympiacos | | | |
|---|---|---|---|---|---|---|---|---|
| Opponent | Agg. | 1st leg | 2nd leg | | Opponent | Agg. | 1st leg | 2nd leg |
| Poseidon Michaniona | 5–0 (H) | | | First round | Pierikos | 3–1 (H) | | |
| Bye | | | | Additional round | PAOK | 0–0 (4–3 p) (H) | | |
| Makedonikos | 4–2 | 2–0 (A) | 2–2 (H) | Round of 32 | Lamia | 3–1 | 2–1 (H) | 1–0 (A) |
| Aiolikos | 6–0 | 5–0 (H) | 1–0 (A) | Round of 16 | Iraklis | 3–2 | 3–1 (H) | 0–1 (A) |
| Ergotelis | 10–3 | 3–2 (A) | 7–1 (H) | Quarter-finals | Ethnikos Piraeus | 4–1 | 3–1 (H) | 1–0 (A) |
| AEK Athens | 4–3 | 2–2 (A) | 2–1 (H) | Semi-finals | Aris | 3–2 | 1–1 (A) | 2–1 (H) |

== Match ==
=== Details ===
28 May 1986
21:00 EEST

| Panathinaikos | 4–0 | Olympiacos |
|---|---|---|
| Vlachos 24'; Dimopoulos 52'; Saravakos 57', 72' | Report |

Olympic Stadium, Marousi
Attendance: 72,948
Referee: Kostas Dimitriadis (Piraeus)

| Panathinaikos | Olympiacos |

| GK | 1 | (Greece) Antonis Minou |
| DF | 2 | (Greece) Konstantinos Tarasis |
| DF | 3 | (Greece) Nikos Patsiavouras |
| DF | 4 | (Greece) Giannis Kyrastas (c) |
| DF | 6 | (Greece) Kostas Mavridis |
| MF | 5 | (Socialist Federal Republic of Yugoslavia) Velimir Zajec |
| MF | 10 | (Greece) Vangelis Vlachos |
| MF | 8 | (Greece) Michalis Gerothodoros | (substituted off) 61' |
| MF | 9 | (Greece) Kostas Batsinilas |
| FW | 7 | (Greece) Dimitris Saravakos |
| FW | 11 | (Greece) Christos Dimopoulos | (substituted off) 84' |
Substitutes:
| GK | 15 | (Greece) Ilias Missas |
| MF | 12 | (Argentina) Juan Ramón Rocha | (substituted on) 61' |
| MF | 14 | (Greece) Kostas Antoniou | (substituted on) 84' |
| MF | 16 | (Greece) Lysandros Georgamlis |
| FW | 13 | (Greece) Thanasis Dimopoulos |
Manager:
(Czech Republic) Petr Packert

| GK | 1 | (Greece) Christos Arvanitis |
| DF | 2 | (Greece) Petros Xanthopoulos |
| DF | 3 | (Greece) Giorgos Kokolakis |
| DF | 4 | (Greece) Giorgos Togias |
| DF | 5 | (Greece) Petros Michos (c) |
| MF | 6 | (Greece) Giorgos Semertzidis |
| MF | 7 | (Socialist Federal Republic of Yugoslavia) Miloš Šestić |
| MF | 8 | (Greece) Vasilis Papachristou |
| MF | 10 | (Greece) Tasos Mitropoulos | (red card) 90+1' |
| FW | 9 | (Greece) Nikos Anastopoulos |
| FW | 11 | (Greece) Georgios Vaitsis | | (substituted off) 46' |
Substitutes:
| GK | 15 | (Greece) Giannis Papamichail |
| DF | 16 | (Greece) Makis Angelinas |
| MF | 12 | (Greece) Vasilis Papangelis | | (substituted on) 46' |
| MF | 14 | (Greece) Michalis Georgoudakis |
| FW | 13 | (Greece) Takis Lemonis |
Manager:
(Greece) Antonis Georgiadis

Assistant referees:
Giorgos Koukoulakis (Heraklion)
Nikos Chrysanis (Imathia)

Match rules

- 90 minutes
- 30 minutes of extra time if necessary
- Penalty shootout if scores still level
- Five named substitutes
- Maximum of two substitutions

== See also ==
- 1985–86 Greek Football Cup
