= 1989–90 Greek Football Cup =

1989–90 Greek Cup
Tournament details
- Country: Greece
- Teams: 76

Final positions
- Champions: Olympiacos (18th title)
- Runners-up: OFI

Tournament statistics
- Matches played: 121
- Top goal scorer(s): Dimitris Saravakos; Lajos Detari (8 goals each)

The 1989–90 Greek Football Cup was the 48th edition of the Greek Football Cup.

== Tournament details ==
Totally 76 teams participated, 18 from Alpha Ethniki, 18 from Beta, and 40 from Gamma. It was held in 6 rounds, included final.

It was a very interesting competition, that was characterized by undecided confrontations and enough surprises, from which the mainer was the elimination of AEK Athens by neophyte in Alpha Ethniki Ionikos, in Round of 32. At the same time, PAOK eliminated Sparti on penalty shoot-out. PAOK's goalkeeper, Gitsioudis, warded off all 4 shots of rival players). Iraklis eliminated Ilisiakos after extra time, with away goals rule.

In the third round, PAOK was eliminated on penalties by Olympiacos, after two matches. In the in quarter-finals, there were qualifications of both Panathinaikos, against Iraklis (6–1 at first leg), and OFI, against Athinaikos, that reversed 5–0 the first leg's 0–3. In two very interesting semi-finals, Olympiacos eliminated Panathinaikos after extra time, while OFI qualified against Apollon Athens with a goal in last minutes of the second leg.

In the final, Olympiacos overcame 4–2 OFI and won the Cup after 9 years. For the Cretan team, it was the second and last time until present that they achieved to qualify for a Greek Cup final. Top scorers of the season were Lajos Détári and Dimitris Saravakos, with 8 goals each.

== Calendar ==
Round	Date(s)	Fixtures	Clubs	New entries
Group stage	20, 27 August, 2 September & 4 October 1989	60	76 → 32	76
Round of 32	29 November, 20 December 1989	32	32 → 16	none
Round of 16	10, 24 January 1990	16	16 → 8	none
Quarter-finals	14 February, 7 March 1990	8	8 → 4	none
Semi-finals	23 March, 4 April 1990	4	4 → 2	none
Final	17 May 1990	1	2 → 1	none

== Group stage ==
The phase was played in a single round-robin format. Each win would gain 2 points, each draw 1 and each loss would not gain any point.

=== Group 1 ===
Pos	Team	Pts
1	Olympiacos Volos	8
2	Athinaikos	6
3	Kalamata	3
4	Thriamvos Athens	2
5	Preveza	1

=== Group 2 ===
Pos	Team	Pts
1	Olympiacos	6
2	Sparta	5
3	Korinthos	4
4	Kallithea	4
5	Irodotos	1

=== Group 3 ===
Pos	Team	Pts
1	Panachaiki	6
2	Edessaikos	6
3	Xanthi	5
4	Agrotikos Asteras	2
5	Chalkida	1

=== Group 4 ===
Pos	Team	Pts
1	PAOK	6
2	Egaleo	5
3	Anagennisi Giannitsa	4
4	Panelefsiniakos	3
5	Kozani	2

=== Group 5 ===
Pos	Team	Pts
1	AEK Athens	7
2	Panargiakos	5
3	Alexandreia	5
4	Anagennisi Karditsa	2
5	Anagennisi Arta	1

=== Group 6 ===
Pos	Team	Pts
1	Panathinaikos	8
2	Apollon Athens	4
3	Doxa Vyroas	4
4	Makedonikos	3
5	Achaiki	1

=== Group 7 ===
Pos	Team	Pts
1	Panionios	6
2	Panetolikos	6
3	Atromitos	4
4	Eordaikos	3
5	Pontioi Veria	1

=== Group 8 ===
Pos	Team	Pts
1	Charavgiakos	6
2	Aris	6
3	Kavala	4
4	A.F.C. Kyriakio	2
5	Anagennisi Neapoli	2

=== Group 9 ===
Pos	Team	Pts
1	AEL	7
2	Pierikos	6
3	PAS Giannina	5
4	Aiginiakos	2
5	Panarkadikos	0

=== Group 10 ===
Pos	Team	Pts
1	Levadiakos	7
2	Proodeftiki	6
3	Diagoras	5
4	Acharnaikos	2
5	Apollon Larissa	0

=== Group 11 ===
Pos	Team	Pts
1	Ionikos	7
2	Niki Volos	4
3	Kilkisiakos	4
4	Naoussa	4
5	Ethnikos Asteras	1

=== Group 12 ===
Pos	Team	Pts
1	Iraklis	6
2	EAR	6
3	AE Mesolongi	3
4	Achilleas Farsala	3
5	Anagennisi Kolindros	2

=== Group 13 ===
Pos	Team	Pts
1	Panserraikos	5
2	Veria	5
3	Olympiakos Loutraki	2
4	Asteras Ambelokipoi	0

=== Group 14 ===
Pos	Team	Pts
1	Ethnikos Piraeus	5
2	Neoi Epivates	4
3	Doxa Drama	2
4	Rodos	1

=== Group 15 ===
Pos	Team	Pts
1	OFI	5
2	Kerkyra	3
3	Odysseas Kordelio	3
4	Nigrita	1

=== Group 16 ===
Pos	Team	Pts
1	Apollon Kalamarias	5
2	Ilisiakos	3
3	Trikala	2
4	Kastoria	2

== Knockout phase ==
Each tie in the knockout phase, apart from the final, was played over two legs, with each team playing one leg at home. The team that scored more goals on aggregate over the two legs advanced to the next round. If the aggregate score was level, the away goals rule was applied, i.e. the team that scored more goals away from home over the two legs advanced. If away goals were also equal, then extra time was played. The away goals rule was again applied after extra time, i.e. if there were goals scored during extra time and the aggregate score was still level, the visiting team advanced by virtue of more away goals scored. If no goals were scored during extra time, the winners were decided by a penalty shoot-out. In the final, which were played as a single match, if the score was level at the end of normal time, extra time was played, followed by a penalty shoot-out if the score was still level.
The mechanism of the draws for each round is as follows:

- There are no seedings, and teams from the same group can be drawn against each other.

== Bracket ==
Round of 32
Panargiakos	1	2	3
Athinaikos	2	2	4
Panionios	3	2	5
Niki Volos	0	1	1
Panserraikos	2	1	3
OFI	3	6	9
Aris	3	2	5
Edessaikos	0	1	1
Neoi Epivates	2	1	3
Charavgiakos	4	0	4
Veria	0	0	0
Apollon Athens	1	0	1
Ionikos	2	0	2
AEK Athens	0	0	0
AEL	3	3	6
Kerkyra	1	3	4
PAOK (p)	1	0	1(2)
Sparta	0	1	1(0)
Proodeftiki	1	0	1
Olympiacos	1	2	3
Levadiakos	2	0	2
Olympiacos Volos	2	1	3
Panachaiki	2	2	4
Ethnikos Piraeus	0	2	2
Panathinaikos	3	1	4
EAR	0	1	1
Panetolikos	1	1	2
Pierikos	1	2	3
Apollon Kalamarias	3	3	6
Egaleo	0	1	1
Iraklis (a)	0	1	1
Ilisiakos	0	1	1

Round of 16
Athinaikos	2	0	2
Panionios	0	1	1
OFI	1	1	2
Aris	1	0	1
Charavgiakos	2	0	2
Apollon Athens	1	2	3
Ionikos	1	0	1(8)
AEL (p)	0	1	1(9)
PAOK	1	0	1(3)
Olympiacos (p)	0	1	1(5)
Olympiacos Volos	3	2	5
Panachaiki	0	1	1
Panathinaikos	4	3	7
Pierikos	2	1	3
Apollon Kalamarias	1	0	1
Iraklis	1	2	3

Quarter-finals
Athinaikos	3	0	3
OFI	0	5	5
Apollon Athens (a)	1	2	3
AEL	1	2	3
Olympiacos	5	1	6
Olympiacos Volos	0	2	2
Panathinaikos	6	0	6
Iraklis	1	3	4

Semi-finals
OFI	0	1	1
Apollon Athens	0	0	0
Olympiacos (a.e.t.)	2	3	5
Panathinaikos	1	3	4

Final
OFI	2
Olympiacos	4

== Round of 32 ==
Team 1	Agg.	Team 2	1st leg	2nd leg
Panachaiki	4–2	Ethnikos Piraeus	2–0	2–2
Panionios	5–1	Niki Volos	3–0	2–1
Neoi Epivates	3–4	Charavgiakos	2–4	1–0
Veria	0–1	Apollon Athens	0–1	0–0
Proodeftiki	1–3	Olympiacos	1–1	0–2
Levadiakos	2–3	Olympiacos Volos	2–2	0–1
Panetolikos	2–3	Pierikos	1–1	1–2
Panargiakos	3–4	Athinaikos	1–2	2–2
PAOK	1–1 (2–0 p)	Sparta	1–0	0–1
Aris	5–1	Edessaikos	3–0	2–1
Ionikos	2–0	AEK Athens	2–0	0–0
Apollon Kalamarias	6–1	Egaleo	3–0	3–1
Panserraikos	3–9	OFI	2–3	1–6
Panathinaikos	4–1	EAR	3–0	1–1
Iraklis	(a) 1–1	Ilisiakos	0–0	1–1 (a.e.t.)
AEL	6–4	Kerkyra	3–1	3–3

== Round of 16 ==
Team 1	Agg.	Team 2	1st leg	2nd leg
OFI	2–1	Aris	1–1	1–0
Athinaikos	2–1	Panionios	2–0	0–1
Charavgiakos	2–3	Apollon Athens	2–1	0–2
PAOK	1–1 (3–5 p)	Olympiacos	1–0	0–1
Panathinaikos	7–3	Pierikos	4–2	3–1
Apollon Kalamarias	1–3	Iraklis	1–1	0–2
Olympiacos Volos	5–1	Panachaiki	3–0	2–1
Ionikos	1–1 (8–9 p)	AEL	1–0	0–1

== Quarter-finals ==
Team 1	Agg.	Team 2	1st leg	2nd leg
Apollon Athens	(a) 3–3	AEL	1–1	2–2
Olympiacos	6–2	Olympiacos Volos	5–0	1–2
Athinaikos	3–5	OFI	3–0	0–5
Panathinaikos	6–4	Iraklis	6–1	0–3

== Semi-finals ==
Team 1	Agg.	Team 2	1st leg	2nd leg
OFI	1–0	Apollon Athens	0–0	1–0
Olympiacos	5–4	Panathinaikos	2–1	3–3 (a.e.t.)

== Final ==
17 May 1990
21:00 EEST

OFI	2–4	Olympiacos
Vlastos 48'; Tsimbos 53'	Report	Tsalouchidis 12', 69'; Détári 29' (pen.), 89'

Olympic Stadium, Marousi
Attendance: 47,627
Referee: Stavros Zakestidis (Thessaloniki)
