= Vassilis Karapialis =

Greek footballer (born 1965)

Personal information
- Full name: Vassilios Karapialis
- Date of birth: 13 June 1965 (age 61)
- Place of birth: Larissa, Greece
- Height: 1.78 m (5 ft 10 in)
- Position: Attacking midfielder

Youth career
- 1979–1985: Toxotis Larissa

Senior career*
Years	Team	Apps	(Gls)
1985–1991	AEL	145	(29)
1991–2000	Olympiacos	229	(61)
Total		374	(90)

International career
1988–1994	Greece	21	(2)
- * Club domestic league appearances and goals

Vassilis Karapialis (Greek: Βασίλης Καραπιάλης; born 13 June 1965) is a Greek former professional footballer who played as an attacking midfielder.

== Club career ==
=== Early years ===
Born in Ampelokipoi, Larissa Karapialis started with street football, and in 1979, aged 14, he joined the Toxotis Larissa youth team. In 1980, he moved to Toxotis' first team and after a few years many top-flight clubs interested in him. In 1984, OFI attempted to sign Karapialis for 2.1 million drachmas, but he turned it down. He had an outstanding 1984–85 season with Toxotis, scoring 30 goals while playing as a midfielder.

=== AEL ===
In the summer of 1985, Karapialis was transferred to the then-Greek Football Cup winner, AEL for 1 million drachmas, and became very popular amongst the fans. In the first two seasons, Karapialis was used mainly as a substitute. When he managed to break into the starting XI in the 1987–1988 season, the club won their only league title as the only team outside the two major Greek cities (Athens and Thessaloniki) to have won the Greek Championship with Karapialis being the Player of the Year.

=== Olympiacos ===
In 1991 Karapialis signed for Olympiacos. He made his debut against AEK Athens, when Olympiacos won 4–2, thanks to a hat-trick by Oleg Protasov. He quickly became the leader of the Red Whites, thanks to his aggression and agility. He won one Greek Cup in his first five seasons with Olympiacos, but the next four were outstanding, winning four out of four Championships, another Cup, and a Greek Super Cup. In May 2000, Karapialis announced his retirement from professional football. The same year, he was voted as the third-best Greek professional footballer (after 1979, when football became professional in Greece), just after Vassilis Hatzipanagis and Dimitris Saravakos.

== International career ==
Karapialis appeared in 21 matches for Greece from 1988 to 1994 and scored 2 goals.

Prior to the 1994 FIFA World Cup Greece team, he wasn't included in the squad. As a response, he announced his retirement from the national team.

=== International ===
As of match played 17 December 2022

Appearances and goals by national team and year
National team	Year	Apps	Goals
Greece	1988	5	0
Greece	1989	0	0
Greece	1990	3	1
Greece	1991	8	0
Greece	1992	2	1
Greece	1993	2	0
Greece	1994	1	0
Total		21	2

As of match played 17 December 2022.
Scores and results list Greece's goal tally first, score column indicates score after each Karapialis goal.

List of international goals scored by Vassilis Karapialis
No.	Date	Venue	Opponent	Score	Result	Competition
1	31 October 1990	Olympic Stadium, Athens, Greece	Malta	2–0	4–0	UEFA Euro 1992 qualifying
2	25 March 1992	Tsirio Stadium, Limassol, Cyprus	Cyprus	2–0	3–1	Friendly

== After football ==
During his retirement as a footballer, he would work for Olympiacos, either as a scout or as a manager to the club's youth teams. He would become the owner of his football academy center in Chalandri, Athens.

On 5 June 2021, the Greek media announced his official return to AEL to be in charge of all its youth teams.

== Honours ==
AEL

- Alpha Ethniki: 1987–88

Olympiacos

- Alpha Ethniki: 1996–97, 1997–98, 1998–99, 1999–2000
- Greek Cup: 1991–92, 1998–99
- Greek Super Cup: 1992
