= Minas Hantzidis =

Greek footballer

Personal information
- Date of birth: 4 July 1966 (age 60)
- Place of birth: Kettwig, West Germany
- Height: 1.84 m (6 ft 1/2 in)
- Position: Midfielder

Youth career
- ESV Wuppertal
- Wuppertaler SV

Senior career*
Years	Team	Apps	(Gls)
1985–1988	Bayer Leverkusen	24	(1)
1988	VfL Bochum	3	(1)
1988–1996	Olympiacos	171	(20)
1996	Kastoria	11	(3)
1996–1998	Iraklis	45	(5)
1998	Veria	25	(2)
1998–2000	Wuppertaler SV	39	(5)
2000–2002	SV Elversberg	59	(12)
2002–2003	1. FC Union Solingen	19	(0)
2003	1. FC Kleve	4	(0)
2003–2006	TSV 05 Ronsdorf		
2006–2007	SpVgg Radevormwald		
Total		400	(49)

International career
1994	Greece	10	(1)
- * Club domestic league appearances and goals

Minas Hantzidis (Greek: Μηνάς Χατζίδης; born 4 July 1966) is a Greek former footballer. He played for Bayer Leverkusen, VfL Bochum, Olympiacos, Iraklis, Veria, Wuppertaler SV, SV Elversberg, Union Solingen, 1. FC Kleve, TSV 05 Ronsdorf and SpVgg Radevormwald, as well as for the national side. He competed at the 1994 FIFA World Cup.

== Personal ==
Hantzidis has Greek descent, and his family is from Platy, Imathia.

== Honours ==
Bayer Leverkusen

- UEFA Cup: 1987–88

== International career ==
=== International goals ===
Scores and results list Greece's goal tally first.

No	Date	Venue	Opponent	Score	Result	Competition
1.	28 May 1994	Yale Bowl, New Haven, USA	United States	1–1	1–1	Friendly
