= Panagiotis Sofianopoulos =

Greek footballer

Personal information
- Date of birth: 7 July 1968 (age 58)
- Place of birth: Serres, Greece
- Height: 1.78 m (5 ft 10 in)
- Position: Forward

Senior career*
| Years | Team | Apps | (Gls) |
| 1986–1988 | Panserraikos | 8 | (2) |
| 1988–1995 | Olympiacos | 90 | (24) |
| 1996 | PAOK | 0 | (0) |

International career
| 1991 | Greece U23 | 4 | (7) |
| 1991–1992 | Greece | 2 | (1) |
- * Club domestic league appearances and goals

Panagiotis Sofianopoulos (Greek: Παναγιώτης Σοφιανόπουλος; born 7 July 1968) is a retired Greek football striker.

== Club career ==
Sofianopoulos started his professional career with Panserraikos at the age of 17. In 1988 he transferred to Olympiacos, and he scored 24 goals after 90 caps. His career declined after a serious knee injury and a medical mistake. In 1996 Sofianopoulos signed with PAOK and played only in friendly games during the summer training. He decided to terminate his contract because he didn't recover from his injury. Then, he retired from professional soccer and played amateurly in Ajaccio.

== International career ==
Sofianopoulos won the gold medal at the 1991 Mediterranean Games, where he emerged as the top scorer of the tournament with seven goals. Also, he has two caps with the Greece. He scored his only international goal in 1–0 victory against Iceland, for the 1994 World Cup qualification.
