= Theodoros Pachatouridis =

Greek footballer

Personal information
- Date of birth: 4 September 1967 (age 59)
- Place of birth: Drama, Greece
- Height: 1.76 m (5 ft 9 in)
- Position: Defender

Senior career*
Years	Team	Apps	(Gls)
1983–1988	Doxa Drama	93	(6)
1988–1995	Olympiacos	201	(15)
1995–2001	Ionikos	150	(3)
2001–2002	AO Chania	19	(1)

International career
1987–1992	Greece	2	(0)

Managerial career
- 2002–2003: Iraklis Psachna
- 2003–2004: AO Manis
- 2008–2009: Olympiakos Neon Liosion
- 2010–2012: Greece U17
- 2012–2014: Greece U19
- 2017–2018: AO Thiva
- 2023–today: Hermes Meligous
- * Club domestic league appearances and goals

Theodoros Pachatouridis (Greek: Θεόδωρος Παχατουρίδης; born 4 September 1967) is a retired football defender.

During his club career, Pachatouridis played for Doxa Drama, Olympiacos, Ionikos and AO Chania. He also made 2 appearances for the Greece national football team.

He later became a manager.

== Honours ==
Olympiacos

- Greek Cup: 1989–90, 1991–92
- Greek Super Cup: 1992
