= Georgios Mitsibonas =

Greek footballer (1962–1997)

Giorgos Mitsibonas
Personal information
- Date of birth: 11 November 1962
- Place of birth: Tsaritsani, Greece
- Date of death: 13 September 1997 (aged 34)
- Place of death: Giannouli, Greece
- Positions: Defender; striker

Youth career
- Ikonomos Tsaritsanis

Senior career*
Years	Team	Apps	(Gls)
1981–1989	AEL	210	(24)
1989–1992	PAOK	95	(3)
1992–1994	Olympiacos	51	(9)
1994–1996	AEL	56	(7)
1996–1997	Tyrnavos	29	(8)
Total		441	(51)

International career
1984–1992	Greece	27	(1)
- * Club domestic league appearances and goals

Georgios Mitsibonas (Greek: Γεώργιος Μητσιμπόνας; 11 November 1962 – 13 September 1997) was a Greek football player during the 1980s and 1990s.

== Biography ==
Mitsibonas was born in 1962 in the village of Tsaritsani (Larissa regional unit). He started his football career as a centre forward in Ikonomos Tsaritsanis and in 1981 he signed with AEL where he played one year as a forward. In 1982 the coach of Larissa used him as a sweeper, and as a defender Mitsibonas made a great career. With Larissa he won a Greek Football Cup in 1985 and a Greek football Championship in 1988. This championship was and still remains a huge success, as Larissa became the first, and until now, only team not based in Athens or Thessaloniki to have won the Greek championship. Mitsibonas is believed to be the best Larissa defender and one of the greatest Greek defenders in history. In 1989, he moved to PAOK and three years later he signed with the team of Olympiacos where he won a Greek Football Cup. In 1994, he returned to AEL, but nothing was like before. Many good players had left the team and Larissa eventually in 1996 failed to remain in the first division. Then Mitsibonas moved to AE Tyrnavos, a team in the Greek Third Division, in the city of Tyrnavos, the second biggest of the Larissa regional unit after Larissa.

== Death ==
On 13 September 1997 Mitsibonas was killed in a car crash near the village of Giannouli outside Larissa. He was only thirty-five and left behind his wife and his two daughters. He left also of course a large career, 413 matches and 43 goals in the first Greek division (he played 344 matches and scored 38 goals with AEL) and 27 matches and one goal with the national team of Greece. He was one of the biggest football players not only of Larissa, but also of Greek football.

== Honours ==
AEL

- Alpha Ethniki: 1987–88
- Greek Cup: 1984–85

Olympiacos

- Greek Super Cup: 1992
