= Georgios Vlastos =

Greek footballer and manager

Personal information
- Date of birth: 11 July 1964 (age 62)
- Place of birth: Heraklion, Crete, Greece
- Position: Forward

Senior career*
Years	Team	Apps	(Gls)
–1982	Ergotelis		
1982–1992	OFI		
1992–1995	Rethymniakou		
1995–1997	Agios Nikolaos		

Managerial career
- 2006–2007: Thyella
- 2008–2009: Panegialios
- 2010: Paniliakos
- 2010–2011: Kallithea
- 2013–2014: Pannaxiakos
- 2014: Giouchtas
- 2015–2016: OFI (techn. director)
- * Club domestic league appearances and goals

Georgios Vlastos (Greek: Γεώργιος Βλαστός; born 11 July 1964) is a Greek retired football striker and later manager.
