= Ilias Poursanidis =

Greek footballer

Personal information
- Full name: Ilias Poursanidis
- Date of birth: 13 April 1972 (age 54)
- Place of birth: Athens, Greece
- Height: 1.83 m (6 ft 0 in)
- Position: Defensive midfielder

Team information
- Current team: OFI (Vice–President)

Senior career*
Years	Team	Apps	(Gls)
1990–1992	Chaidari	56	(4)
1992–1997	OFI	106	(1)
1997–2003	Olympiacos	108	(2)
2003–2008	Iraklis	124	(1)
Total		394	(8)

International career
1995–2000	Greece	33	(0)
- * Club domestic league appearances and goals

Ilias Poursanidis (Greek: Ηλίας Πουρσανίδης; born 13 April 1972) is a Greek former professional footballer who played as a defensive midfielder.

== Club career ==
Poursanidis began his career with Athens-based club Chaidari F.C. His quality as a defensive midfielder made him a hot prospect across Greece, and he was eventually signed by Greek first division club OFI. At only 20, Poursanidis soon became a first team regular for the Cretan club, making over 100 appearances in the black and white shirt until he was eventually picked up by Greek champions Olympiacos.

A part in their long running Championship winning squad, Poursanidis won 6 championships as well as 1 Greek Cup. Also experiencing UEFA Champions League football, Poursanidis showed in over 100 appearances spanning 6 years at the club.

Eventually making way for the younger Brazilian superstar Ze Elias, Poursanidis finished his career with a five-year spell at Iraklis. His final match took place on Sunday, 20 April 2008 against his former club Olympiacos at Karaiskakis Stadium. Subbed off near the end of the second half, Poursanidis left the field in tears as over 30,000 Olympiacos fans chanted his name along with a standing ovation.

== International career ==
Poursanidis earned his first call up to Greece during his time at OFI. He would eventually earn himself 22 caps, and become a key part of the UEFA Euro 2000 qualifying squad that barely missed out on the final tournament.

== Honours ==
- Greek Championship: 1997–1998, 1998–1999, 1999–2000, 2000–2001, 2001–2002, 2002–2003
- Greek Cup: 1998–1999
