= 1991–92 Greek Football Cup =

1991–92 Greek Cup
Tournament details
- Country: Greece
- Teams: 72

Final positions
- Champions: Olympiacos (19th title)
- Runners-up: PAOK

Tournament statistics
- Matches played: 118
- Top goal scorer(s): Michalis Iordanidis (9 goals)

The 1991–92 Greek Football Cup was the 50th edition of the Greek Football Cup.

== Tournament details ==
Totally 72 teams participated, 18 from Alpha Ethniki, 18 from Beta, and 36 from Gamma. It was held in 6 rounds, included final.

Until quarter-finals, there were not surprises but also big confrontations, minus the qualification of Iraklis against Aris and the elimination of AEL from the group stage by teams of lower divisions. Most remarkable result of second round was the elimination of Panionios by Atromitos. Even if Panionios won 5–0 in the Nea Smyrni Stadium, it was changed in 0–2 without match, because of outlaw use of a footballer by home team side, while they did not accomplish to reverse the score in the second leg.

In quarter-finals, Olympiacos eliminated Panathinaikos with away goals rule, with a penalty in last minutes of second match. In semi-finals, PAOK eliminated with an impressive 3–0 home victory after extra time (3–2 on aggregate) AEK Athens, the champions of the season. In the final (two-legged matches for second and last time) Olympiacos eventlually won the cup for 19th time in their history, after a 1–1 draw away and a 2–0 win in their home. Michalis Iordanidis of Doxa Drama emerged as the top scorer with 9 goals.

== Calendar ==
Round	Date(s)	Fixtures	Clubs	New entries
Group stage	18, 25, 28 August & 11 September 1991	56	72 → 32	72
Round of 32	8, 22 January 1992	32	32 → 16	none
Round of 16	5 February, 4 March 1992	16	16 → 8	none
Quarter-finals	11 March, 1 April 1992	8	8 → 4	none
Semi-finals	15, 29 April 1992	4	4 → 2	none
Final	20, 27 May 1992	2	2 → 1	none

== Group stage ==
The phase was played in a single round-robin format. Each win would gain 2 points, each draw 1 and each loss would not gain any point.

=== Group 1 ===
Pos	Team	Pts
1	Niki Volos	6
2	Athinaikos	6
3	Neoi Epivates	4
4	Kallithea	2
5	Kalamata	2

=== Group 2 ===
Pos	Team	Pts
1	Charavgiakos	6
2	Korinthos	6
3	Proodeftiki	4
4	Sparta	3
5	Edessaikos	1

=== Group 3 ===
Pos	Team	Pts
1	Ionikos	7
2	Ethnikos Piraeus	5
3	Panetolikos	4
4	Anagennisi Kolindros	2
5	Rodos	2

=== Group 4 ===
Pos	Team	Pts
1	Poseidon Michaniona	6
2	PAOK	5
3	Olympiacos Volos	4
4	AE Mesolongi	4
5	Poseidon Heraklion	1

=== Group 5 ===
Pos	Team	Pts
1	Olympiacos	6
2	Panionios	5
3	Ilisiakos	4
4	Naoussa	3
5	Preveza	2

=== Group 6 ===
Pos	Team	Pts
1	AEK Athens	6
2	Doxa Vyronas	5
3	EAR	5
4	Panachaiki	4
5	Aris Nikaias	0

=== Group 7 ===
Pos	Team	Pts
1	Levadiakos	6
2	Pierikos	6
3	PAS Giannina	4
4	Fostiras	2
5	Thriamvos Athens	2

=== Group 8 ===
Pos	Team	Pts
1	Apollon Athens	8
2	Chaidari	5
3	Kozani	5
4	Panelefsiniakos	2
5	Argos Orestiko	0

=== Group 9 ===
Pos	Team	Pts
1	Panargiakos	4
2	Atromitos	3
3	AEL	3
4	Diagoras	2

=== Group 10 ===
Pos	Team	Pts
1	Panathinaikos	6
2	Eordaikos	3
3	Trikala	2
4	Anagennisi Giannitsa	1

=== Group 11 ===
Pos	Team	Pts
1	Doxa Drama	5
2	Chalkidona	4
3	Pontioi Veria	2
4	Nigrita	1

=== Group 12 ===
Pos	Team	Pts
1	Iraklis	5
2	Kastoria	4
3	Paniliakos	3
4	Makedonikos	0

=== Group 13 ===
Pos	Team	Pts
1	Skoda Xanthi	6
2	Anagennisi Arta	4
3	Anagennisi Neapoli	1
4	A.F.C. Kyriakio	1

=== Group 14 ===
Pos	Team	Pts
1	Aris	6
2	A.F.C. Patra	4
3	Pandramaikos	2
4	Pannafpliakos	0

=== Group 15 ===
Pos	Team	Pts
1	Panserraikos	4
2	Apollon Kalamarias	4
3	Asteras Ambelokipoi	3
4	Egaleo	1

=== Group 16 ===
Pos	Team	Pts
1	OFI	6
2	Kavala	4
3	Apollon Larissa	2
4	Veria	0

== Knockout phase ==
Each tie in the knockout phase, was played over two legs, with each team playing one leg at home. The team that scored more goals on aggregate over the two legs advanced to the next round. If the aggregate score was level, the away goals rule was applied, i.e. the team that scored more goals away from home over the two legs advanced. If away goals were also equal, then extra time was played. The away goals rule was again applied after extra time, i.e. if there were goals scored during extra time and the aggregate score was still level, the visiting team advanced by virtue of more away goals scored. If no goals were scored during extra time, the winners were decided by a penalty shoot-out.
The mechanism of the draws for each round is as follows:

- There are no seedings, and teams from the same group can be drawn against each other.

== Bracket ==
Round of 32
Iraklis	2	0	2
Aris	0	1	1
Ionikos	0	1	1
AEK Athens	2	2	4
Apollon Athens (a.e.t.)	2	1	3
Pierikos	0	2	2
Anagennisi Arta	1	0	1
OFI	1	6	7
Ethnikos Piraeus (a)	0	1	1
Athinaikos	0	1	1
Doxa Drama	2	3	5
Niki Volos	1	2	3
A.F.C. Patra	0	1	1
PAOK	1	3	4
Korinthos	5	2	7
Eordaikos	0	1	1
Levadiakos	2	0	2
Panserraikos	0	0	0
Charavgiakos (a.e.t.)	2	1	3
Poseidon Michaniona	1	4	5
Doxa Vyronas	1	0	1
Chaidari	0	2	2
Panionios	0	1	1
Atromitos	2	0	2
Apollon Kalamarias	3	1	4
Skoda Xanthi	3	4	7
Kastoria	1	0	1
Olympiacos	3	4	7
Kavala	1	1	2
Panargiakos	2	1	3
Chalkidona	1	2	3
Panathinaikos	2	6	8

Round of 16
Iraklis	1	0	1
AEK Athens	1	4	5
Apollon Athens	0	3	3
OFI	1	3	4
Ethnikos Piraeus	0	1	1
Doxa Drama	4	0	4
PAOK	4	0	4
Korinthos	1	0	1
Levadiakos	4	1	5
Poseidon Michaniona (a)	2	3	5
Chaidari	0	0	0
Atromitos	0	1	1
Skoda Xanthi	2	2	4
Olympiacos	1	4	5
Panargiakos	1	1	2
Panathinaikos	2	1	3

Quarter-finals
AEK Athens	2	0	2
OFI	1	0	1
Doxa Drama	2	0	2
PAOK	0	4	4
Poseidon Michaniona	0	1	1
Atromitos	0	2	2
Olympiacos (a)	0	1	1
Panathinaikos	0	1	1

Semi-finals
AEK Athens	2	0	2
PAOK (a.e.t.)	0	3	3
Atromitos	1	1	2
Olympiacos	4	4	8

Final
PAOK	1	0	1
Olympiacos	1	2	3

== Round of 32 ==
Team 1	Agg.	Team 2	1st leg	2nd leg
Charavgiakos	3–5	Poseidon Michaniona	2–1	1–4 (a.e.t.)
A.F.C. Patra	1–4	PAOK	0–1	1–3
Ionikos	1–4	AEK Athens	0–2	1–2
Apollon Kalamarias	4–7	Skoda Xanthi	3–3	1–4
Apollon Athens	3–2	Pierikos	2–0	1–2 (a.e.t.)
Panionios	1–2	Atromitos	0–2 (w/o)^{*}	1–0
Doxa Vyronas	1–2	Chaidari	1–0	0–2
Levadiakos	2–0	Panserraikos	2–0	0–0
Korinthos	7–1	Eordaikos	5–0	2–1
Chalkidona	3–8	Panathinaikos	1–2	2–6
Anagennisi Arta	1–7	OFI	1–1	0–6
Kavala	2–3	Panargiakos	1–2	1–1
Iraklis	2–1	Aris	2–0	0–1
Kastoria	1–7	Olympiacos	1–3	0–4
Doxa Drama	5–3	Niki Volos	2–1	3–2
Ethnikos Piraeus	(a) 1–1	Athinaikos	0–0	1–1 (a.e.t.)

^{*}The match originally ended 5–0 for Panionios but later it was awarded 0–2 to Atromitos.

== Round of 16 ==
Team 1	Agg.	Team 2	1st leg	2nd leg
Levadiakos	5–5 (a)	Poseidon Michaniona	4–2	1–3
Ethnikos Piraeus	1–4	Doxa Drama	0–4	1–0
Apollon Athens	3–4	OFI	0–1	3–3
PAOK	4–1	Korinthos	4–1	0–0
Skoda Xanthi	4–5	Olympiacos	2–1	2–4
Chaidari	0–1	Atromitos	0–0	0–1
Panargiakos	2–3	Panathinaikos	1–2	1–1
Iraklis	1–5	AEK Athens	1–1	0–4

== Quarter-finals ==
Team 1	Agg.	Team 2	1st leg	2nd leg
Poseidon Michaniona	1–2	Atromitos	0–0	1–2
Doxa Drama	2–4	PAOK	2–0	0–4
Olympiacos	(a) 1–1	Panathinaikos	0–0	1–1
AEK Athens	2–1	OFI	0–0	2–1

== Semi-finals ==
Team 1	Agg.	Team 2	1st leg	2nd leg
AEK Athens	2–3	PAOK	2–0	0–3 (a.e.t.)
Atromitos	2–8	Olympiacos	1–4	1–4

== Final ==
=== First leg ===
20 May 1992
18:00 EEST

PAOK	1–1	Olympiacos
Skartados 52'	Report (page 2)	Tsalouchidis 63'

Toumba Stadium, Thessaloniki
Attendance: 25,744
Referee: Kostas Dimitriadis (Piraeus)

=== Second leg ===
27 May 1992
20:30 EEST

Olympiacos	2–0	PAOK
Litovchenko 21'; Tsalouchidis 62'	Report (page 2)

Karaiskakis Stadium, Piraeus
Attendance: 29,831
Referee: Stavros Zakestidis (Thessaloniki)

Olympiacos won 3–1 on aggregate.
