= Georgios Vaitsis =

Greek footballer

Personal information
- Date of birth: 1 August 1967 (age 59)
- Place of birth: Arta, Greece
- Position: Forward

Senior career*
Years	Team	Apps	(Gls)
1983–1985	Anagennisi Arta	53	(10)
1985–1987	Olympiacos	34	(8)
1988–1991	Panachaiki	109	(41)
1991–1994	Olympiacos	55	(9)
1994–1999	Panachaiki	151	(26)
1999–2000	Panelefsiniakos	22	(5)
2000–2002	Ethnikos Piraeus	41	(14)
2002	Agios Dimitrios	4	(0)
2002-2003	Mandraikos		
2003-2004	AO Oropou		
Total		469	(113)

International career
1992	Greece	1	(0)
- * Club domestic league appearances and goals

Georgios Vaitsis (Greek: Γεώργιος Βαΐτσης; born 1 August 1967) is a Greek former professional footballer. A powerful forward, he is mostly remembered for his headers and his shooting skills. Vaitsis played for Anagennisi Artas, Panachaiki and Olympiacos.

== Statistics ==
Vaitsis had 139 First Division appearances for Panachaiki and scored 29 goals. He had one cap for the Greece national team.

His most celebrated and remembered goal was in the second round of the 1992–93 European Cup Winners Cup, when he scored the winner for Olympiacos Piraeus FC with a header, against AS Monaco in France.
