= Hennadiy Lytovchenko =

Ukrainian footballer (born 1963)

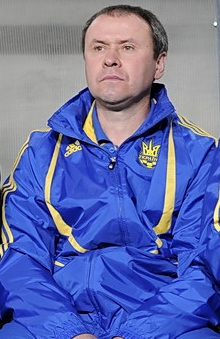

Personal information
- Full name: Hennadiy Vladimirovych Lytovchenko
- Date of birth: 11 September 1963 (age 63)
- Place of birth: Dniprodzerzhynsk, Ukrainian SSR, Soviet Union
- Height: 1.78 m (5 ft 10 in)
- Position: Midfielder

Youth career
- 1975–1980: Dnipro Dnipropetrovsk

Senior career*
Years	Team	Apps	(Gls)
1980	Metalurh Dniprodzerzhinsk	2	(0)
1981–1987	Dnipro Dnipropetrovsk	183	(36)
1988–1990	Dynamo Kyiv	82	(20)
1990–1993	Olympiacos	80	(9)
1993	Boryspil	17	(3)
1993–1995	Admira Wacker Mödling	19	(3)
1995	AEL Limassol	8	(3)
1995–1996	Chornomorets Odesa	10	(1)
Total		401	(75)

International career
1984–1990	USSR	57	(14)
1993–1994	Ukraine	4	(0)

Managerial career
- 1996–1997: CSKA Kyiv (assistant)
- 1998–2000: Kryvbas Kryvyi Rih (assistant)
- 2000–2001: Kryvbas Kryvyi Rih
- 2002–2010: Ukraine U-21 (assistant)
- 2002–2003: Arsenal Kyiv (assistant)
- 2003–2004: Metalist Kharkiv
- 2005: Arsenal Kharkiv
- 2005–2006: Kharkiv
- 2007–2010: Dynamo-2 Kyiv
- 2012: Kryvbas Kryvyi Rih (assistant)
- 2013–2014: Volga Nizhny Novgorod (assistant)
- 2016–2017: Dynamo Moscow (assistant)
- 2020: Obolon Kyiv (assistant)
- 2021: Olimpik Donetsk (assistant)
- 2021–2023: Polissya Zhytomyr (assistant)
Medal record
Men's football
Representing Soviet Union
UEFA European Championship
Runner-up	1988 West Germany
UEFA European U-19 Championships
Bronze medal – third place	1982 Finland
- * Club domestic league appearances and goals

Hennadiy Volodymyrovych Lytovchenko (Ukrainian: Геннадій Володимирович Литовченко; Russian: Геннадий Владимирович Литовченко, Gennadiy Vladimirovich Litovchenko; born 11 September 1963) is a Ukrainian football coach and former player who played as a midfielder. He was a member of the Soviet squad that finished runners-up at UEFA Euro 1988.

At his peak he was considered one of the finest midfielders in European football.

== Honours ==
Dnipro Dnipropetrovsk

- Soviet Top League: 1983

Dynamo Kyiv

- Soviet Top League: 1990
- USSR Cup: 1990

Olympiacos

- Greek Cup: 1992
- Greek Super Cup: 1992

Soviet Union

- European Football Championship runner-up: 1988

Individual

- Soviet Footballer of the Year: 1984
- Ukrainian Footballer of the Year: 1984
- Oleh Blokhin club: 112 goals
