= Ilias Talikriadis =

Greek footballer

Personal information
- Date of birth: 10 July 1965 (age 61)
- Place of birth: Xanthi, Greece
- Height: 1.87 m (6 ft 2 in)
- Position: Goalkeeper

Senior career*
Years	Team	Apps	(Gls)
1983–1987	Xanthi		
1987–1994	Olympiacos	128	(0)
1994–1996	Iraklis	18	(0)
1996–1997	Kastoria	7	(0)
1997	Xanthi	3	(0)
1997–1999	Aris	6	(0)

International career
1988	Greece	5	(0)
- * Club domestic league appearances and goals

Ilias Talikriadis (Greek: Ηλίας Ταληκριάδης; born 10 July 1965) is a retired Greek football goalkeeper.
