= Panagiotis Tsalouchidis =

Greek footballer

Personal information
- Full name: Panagiotis Tsalouchidis
- Date of birth: 30 March 1963 (age 63)
- Place of birth: Veria, Greece
- Height: 1.88 m (6 ft 2 in)
- Position: Midfielder

Senior career*
| Years | Team | Apps | (Gls) |
| 1983–1987 | Veria | 144 | (41) |
| 1987–1995 | Olympiacos | 235 | (64) |
| 1995–1996 | PAOK | 29 | (9) |
| 1996–1999 | Veria | 92 | (2) |
| Total | | 500 | (116) |

International career
| 1987–1995 | Greece | 76 | (16) |

Managerial career
- 2000: Veria
- 2001–2003: Veria
- 2004: Veria
- 2008: Veria
- 2009–2010: Veria
- 2015–2017: Veria (team manager)
- * Club domestic league appearances and goals

Panagiotis Tsalouchidis (Greek: Παναγιώτης Τσαλουχίδης; born 30 March 1963) is a Greek former football player and coach who played professionally from 1983 to 1999 for Veria, Olympiacos and PAOK, making 500 league appearances in Greek football.

Tsalouchidis also represented Greece at international level, earning 76 caps between 1987 and 1995, and was a member of the squad that competed in the 1994 FIFA World Cup.

== Post-playing career ==
On 26 August 2015, Tsalouchidis was appointed as team manager of Veria, replacing Giorgos Lanaris.

== Honours ==
Olympiacos

- Greek Cup: 1989–90, 1991–92
- Greek Super Cup: 1987, 1992
