= Nikos Tsiantakis =

Greek footballer

Personal information
- Full name: Nikolaos Tsiantakis
- Date of birth: 20 October 1963 (age 63)
- Place of birth: Gorgogyri, Trikala, Greece
- Height: 1.80 m (5 ft 11 in)
- Position: Midfielder

Senior career*
Years	Team	Apps	(Gls)
1981–1985	Atromitos		
1985–1987	Panionios	61	(6)
1987–1994	Olympiacos	186	(22)
1994–1995	Aris	27	(4)
1995–1997	Ionikos	47	(3)
1997–1998	OFI	24	(1)
1998–1999	Ethnikos Asteras	6	(0)
Total		351	(36)

International career
1988–1994	Greece	47	(2)
- * Club domestic league appearances and goals

Nikos Tsiantakis (Greek: Νίκος Τσιαντάκης, born 20 October 1963) is a Greek former football midfielder.

== Club career ==
Tsiantakis most prominently played for Panionios and Olympiacos. In the summer of 1994 he moved to Aris, playing for various Greek teams before retiring in 1999. While playing, he demonstrated great pace and dribbling skills and possessed an amazing cross-pass skill.

== International career ==
Tsiantakis played at the 1994 World Cup with the national team. From 1988 to 1994, he made 47 caps and scored 2 international goals.

== After football ==
Tsiantakis currently owns a PROPO (Greek betting) shop, in Pefki (Athens suburb).

== Career statistics ==
Season	Club	Matches	Goals
1985–86	Panionios	26	3
1986–87	Panionios	26	3
1987–88	Panionios	9	0
1987–88	Olympiacos	17	3
1988–89	Olympiacos	30	4
1989–90	Olympiacos	30	3
1990–91	Olympiacos	29	2
1991–92	Olympiacos	30	3
1992–93	Olympiacos	29	4
1993–94	Olympiacos	30	3
1994–95	Olympiacos	1	0
1994–95	Aris	19	4
1995–96	Aris	8	0
1995–96	Ionikos	15	0
1996–97	Ionikos	32	3
1997–98	OFI	19	1
1998–99	OFI	5	0
1998–99	Ethnikos Asteras	6	0
