= Kyriakos Karataidis =

Greek footballer

Personal information
- Date of birth: 4 July 1965 (age 61)
- Place of birth: Oinoi, Kastoria, Greece
- Height: 1.80 m (5 ft 11 in)
- Position: Defender

Senior career*
Years	Team	Apps	(Gls)
1981–1982	Flatsata Oinois		
1982–1988	Kastoria	153	(4)
1988–2001	Olympiacos	363	(3)
Total		516	(7)

International career
1990–1998	Greece	34	(0)
- * Club domestic league appearances and goals

Kyriakos Karataidis (Greek: Κυριάκος Καραταΐδης; born 4 July 1965) is a former Greek football player. He played for Olympiacos, as well as for the national side.

== Career ==
Born in Oinoi, Kastoria, Karataidis began playing senior club football with Flatsata Oinois in 1981, and joined Kastoria one year later in 1982.

In 1988, Karataidis would join Olympiacos, the club he would play for until he retired in 2001. He won five consecutive Alpha Ethniki and three Greek Football Cup titles with Olympiacos.

Karataidis made 34 appearances for the Greece from 1990 to 1998. He competed at the 1994 FIFA World Cup finals.

== Honours ==
Olympiacos

- Alpha Ethniki: 1997, 1998, 1999, 2000, 2001
- Greek Cup: 1990, 1992, 1999
- Greek Super Cup: 1992
