= 1982–83 PAOK FC season =

PAOK
1982–83 season
- President: Giorgos Pantelakis
- Manager: Heinz Höher
- Stadium: Toumba Stadium
- Alpha Ethniki: 4th
- Greek Cup: Runners-up
- UEFA Cup: 2nd round
- Top goalscorer: League: Christos Dimopoulos (11); All: Christos Dimopoulos (16)
- Highest home attendance: 37,000 vs Sevilla

The 1982–83 season was PAOK Football Club's 56th in existence and the club's 24th consecutive season in the top flight of Greek football. The team entered the Greek Football Cup in first round and also participated in the UEFA Cup.

== Players ==
=== Squad ===
Note: Flags indicate national team as defined under FIFA eligibility rules; some limited exceptions apply. Players may hold more than one non-FIFA nationality.

No.	Pos.	Nation	Player
—	GK	YUG	Mladen Furtula
—	GK	GRE	Takis Pantelis
—	DF	GRE	Kostas Iosifidis
—	DF	GRE	Nikos Alavantas
—	DF	GRE	Giannis Psarras
—	DF	GRE	Theodoros Apostolidis
—	DF	GRE	Apostolos Tsourelas
—	DF	GRE	Filotas Pellios
—	DF	GRE	Stathis Apostolou
—	DF	GRE	Charis Baniotis
—	MF	GRE	Giorgos Koudas (captain)
—	MF	GRE	Ioannis Damanakis

No.	Pos.	Nation	Player
—	MF	GRE	Thomas Singas
—	MF	GRE	Georgios Skartados
—	MF	GER	Holger Trimhold
—	MF	GRE	Vasilios Vasilakos
—	MF	GRE	Vasilis Georgopoulos
—	MF	GRE	Stathis Triantafyllidis
—	MF	GRE	Kyriakos Alexandridis
—	FW	GRE	Georgios Kostikos
—	FW	GRE	Christos Dimopoulos
—	FW	BRA	Neto Guerino

== Transfers ==
Players transferred in

Transfer Window	Pos.	Name	Club	Fee
Summer	DF	(Greece) Stathis Apostolou	(Greece) Thyella Serres	?
Summer	MF	(Greece) Georgios Skartados	(Greece) Rodos	8 million Dr.
Summer	MF	(Germany) Holger Trimhold	(Germany) Eintracht Braunschweig	Free

Players transferred out

Transfer Window	Pos.	Name	Club	Fee
Summer	DF	(Hungary) József Salomon	(Hungary) Diósgyőri VTK	Free
Summer	DF	(Greece) Ioannis Gounaris	(Greece) Olympiacos	Free

== Pre-season ==
Win Draw Loss

27 July 1982 Friendly	SG Wattenscheid 09	1–1	PAOK	West Germany
	38' (pen.)		Trimhold 25'

28 July 1982 Friendly	Viktoria Köln	2–2	PAOK	West Germany
			Trimhold; Siggas

31 July 1982 Friendly	VfL Bochum	5–0	PAOK	West Germany
	7'; 35'; 45'; 55'; 90'

1 August 1982 Friendly	Hattingen	0–5	PAOK	West Germany
			Kostikos; Vasilakos; Dimopoulos

4 August 1982 Friendly	KSV Baunatal	1–4	PAOK	West Germany
			Psarras; Dimopoulos; Skartados; Trimhold

12 August 1982 Friendly	PAOK	1–2	Aris	Thessaloniki
	Georgopoulos 40'		Zelelidis 35'; Charalambidis 57' (pen.)	Stadium: Toumba Stadium; Referee: Filippiadis

18 August 1982 Friendly	PAOK	1–0	Iraklis	Thessaloniki
	Dimopoulos 37'			Stadium: Toumba Stadium

25 August 1982 Friendly	PAOK	1–2	Panionios	Thessaloniki
	Vasilakos 28'		Mavrikis 83'; Saravakos 85'	Stadium: Toumba Stadium

30 August 1982 Friendly	PAOK	4–1	AEK Athens	Thessaloniki
	Dimopoulos 8', 18', 72'; Trimhold 56' (pen.)		Mavros 28'	Stadium: Toumba Stadium; Referee: Tikmoglou

5 September 1982 Friendly	Panachaiki	1–2	PAOK	Patras
	Bonić 4'		Pellios 15'; Guerino 75'	Stadium: Kostas Davourlis Stadium

7 September 1982 Friendly	Rodos	0–1	PAOK	Rhodes
			Vasilakos 70'	Stadium: Diagoras Stadium; Referee: Argyriou

== Competitions ==
=== Overview ===
Competition	Record							
Competition	Pld	W	D	L	GF	GA	GD	Win %
Alpha Ethniki	34	18	6	10	49	28	+21	52.94
Greek Cup	10	9	0	1	25	3	+22	90.00
UEFA Cup	4	2	0	2	4	6	−2	50.00
Total	48	29	6	13	78	37	+41	60.42

Source: Competitions

== Alpha Ethniki ==
=== Standings ===
Pos	Team	Pld	W	D	L	GF	GA	GD	Pts	Qualification or relegation
2	AEL	34	18	9	7	54	27	+27	45	Qualification for UEFA Cup first round
3	AEK Athens	34	19	7	8	54	39	+15	45	Qualification for Cup Winners' Cup first round
4	PAOK	34	18	6	10	49	28	+21	42	Qualification for UEFA Cup first round
5	Aris	34	15	11	8	35	23	+12	41	
6	Panathinaikos	34	14	9	11	50	42	+8	37	

Source: RSSSF
Rules for classification: 1st points; 2nd decision match; 3rd head-to-head goal difference.

==== Results summary ====
Overall								Home						Away					
Pld	W	D	L	GF	GA	GD	Pts	W	D	L	GF	GA	GD	W	D	L	GF	GA	GD
34	18	6	10	49	28	+21	60	14	1	2	38	12	+26	4	5	8	11	16	−5

Last updated: 26 June 1982.
Source: Competitive matches

==== Results by round ====
Round	1	2	3	4	5	6	7	8	9	10	11	12	13	14	15	16	17	18	19	20	21	22	23	24	25	26	27	28	29	30	31	32	33	34
Ground	H	A	A	H	A	H	A	H	A	H	A	H	H	A	H	A	H	A	H	H	A	H	A	H	A	H	A	H	A	A	H	A	H	A
Result	W	D	D	L	L	W	D	W	L	W	W	W	W	D	D	L	W	L	W	W	D	W	L	L	L	W	W	W	W	W	W	L	W	L
Position	5	7	7	11	14	9	9	7	7	6	4	3	3	3	4	4	4	5	4	4	4	4	4	5	5	5	5	5	5	3	3	4	4	4

Source: League matches
A = Away; H = Home; W = Win; D = Draw; L = Loss

==== Matches ====
Win Draw Loss

19 September 1982 1	PAOK	3–2	AEL	Veria
	Dramalis 29' (o.g.); Trimhold (penalty missed) 60'; Koudas 78'; Alavantas 89'		Andreoudis 44'; Valaoras 68'	Stadium: Veria Stadium; Referee: Fakis
Note: Game held at Veria because PAOK had a stadium ban from the previous season.

26 September 1982 2	Makedonikos	0–0	PAOK	Thessaloniki
				Stadium: Makedonikos Stadium; Attendance: 6,901

3 October 1982 3	PAS Giannina	0–0	PAOK	Ioannina
				Stadium: Zosimades Stadium; Attendance: 4,737; Referee: Argyriou

31 October 1982 4	PAOK	0–2	Aris	Thessaloniki
			Kouis 54'; Michalitsos (yellow card) 37' (yellow-red card) 55'; Doulgerakis 87'	Stadium: Toumba Stadium; Attendance: 21,026; Referee: Voutsaras

7 November 1982 5	Doxa Drama	3–1	PAOK	Drama
	Barzov 44'; Vasilakakis 52'; Flegas 59'		Kostikos 50'	Stadium: Doxa Drama Stadium; Attendance: 5,527

21 November 1982 6	PAOK	4–2	OFI	Thessaloniki
	Georgopoulos 28'; Dimopoulos 38'; Trimhold 44'; Damanakis 60' (pen.)		Agiomamitis (red card) 31'; Kirisits 41'; Iordănescu 76' (pen.)	Stadium: Toumba Stadium; Attendance: 4,409; Referee: Kolokythas

28 November 1982 7	Iraklis	0–0	PAOK	Thessaloniki
			Damanakis (penalty missed) 32'	Stadium: Kaftanzoglio Stadium; Attendance: 12,424; Referee: Pounartzis

5 December 1982 8	PAOK	1–0	Panachaiki	Thessaloniki
	Skartados 56'			Stadium: Toumba Stadium; Attendance: 2,481

12 December 1982 9	Apollon Athens	2–1	PAOK	Athens
	Darras 66'; Rammos 76'; Prokovas (red card) 82'		Vasilakos 79'	Stadium: Rizoupoli Stadium; Attendance: 1,527

19 December 1982 10	PAOK	5–0	AEK Athens	Thessaloniki
	Koudas 11'; Kostikos 50'; Dimopoulos 60', 69', 85'			Stadium: Toumba Stadium; Attendance: 10,468

27 December 1982 11	Ethnikos Piraeus	1–2	PAOK	Piraeus
	Ilunga 59'		Triantafyllidis 38'; Dimopoulos 56'	Stadium: Karaiskakis Stadium; Attendance: 5,624; Referee: Messalas

3 January 1983 12	PAOK	2–0	Rodos	Thessaloniki
	Dimopoulos 33' (pen.); Triantafyllidis 76'			Stadium: Toumba Stadium; Attendance: 7,774; Referee: Saraliotis

9 January 1983 13	PAOK	3–0	Kastoria	Thessaloniki
	Triantafyllidis 4', 80'; Georgopoulos 74'			Stadium: Toumba Stadium; Attendance: 7,676; Referee: Batras

16 January 1983 14	Panserraikos	0–0	PAOK	Serres
			Guerino (penalty missed) 1'	Stadium: Serres Municipal Stadium; Attendance: 11,026

23 January 1983 15	PAOK	1–1	Olympiacos	Thessaloniki
	Dimopoulos (penalty missed) 81'; Guerino 81'		Anastopoulos 3' (pen.); Mitropoulos (red card) 82'	Stadium: Toumba Stadium; Attendance: 33,834; Referee: Georgiadis

30 January 1983 16	Panionios	1–0	PAOK	Athens
	Papamichail 65'			Stadium: Nea Smyrni Stadium; Attendance: 7,465

6 February 1983 17	PAOK	2–0	Panathinaikos	Thessaloniki
	Damanakis 48'; Trimhold 54'			Stadium: Toumba Stadium; Attendance: 19,164; Referee: Argyriou

13 February 1983 18	AEL	1–0	PAOK	Larissa
	Ziogas 90'			Stadium: Alcazar Stadium; Attendance: 14,849

20 February 1983 19	PAOK	3–0	Makedonikos	Thessaloniki
	Dimopoulos 23'; Kostikos 74'; Triantafyllidis 76'			Stadium: Toumba Stadium; Attendance: 3,820; Referee: Loukidis

27 February 1983 20	PAOK	4–1	PAS Giannina	Thessaloniki
	Dimopoulos 10', 18'; Kostikos 26'; Vasilakos 76'		Petriniotis 19' (pen.)	Stadium: Toumba Stadium; Attendance: 5,628; Referee: Argyriou

6 March 1983 21	Aris	0–0	PAOK	Thessaloniki
				Stadium: Kleanthis Vikelidis Stadium; Attendance: 18,699; Referee: Voulgaris

13 March 1983 22	PAOK	2–0	Doxa Drama	Thessaloniki
	Dimopoulos 48', 54' (pen.)			Stadium: Toumba Stadium; Attendance: 7,829; Referee: Adamopoulos

20 March 1983 23	OFI	2–1	PAOK	Heraklion
	Agiomamitis 74'; Kirisits 82' (pen.)		Vasilakos 42'	Stadium: Theodoros Vardinogiannis Stadium; Attendance: 4,914; Referee: Kolokythas

3 April 1983 24	PAOK	1–3	Iraklis	Thessaloniki
	Trimhold 69'		Kalambakas 31', 36'; Kafkenaris 87'	Stadium: Toumba Stadium; Attendance: 15,129; Referee: Printezis

10 April 1983 25	Panachaiki	1–0	PAOK	Patras
	Bonić 80'			Stadium: Kostas Davourlis Stadium; Attendance: 2,707

17 April 1983 26	PAOK	2–0	Apollon Athens	Thessaloniki
	Dimopoulos (red card) 17'; Skartados (penalty missed) 51' 51'; Trimhold 60'			Stadium: Toumba Stadium; Attendance: 3,023; Referee: Anastasiadis

1 May 1983 27	AEK Athens	1–3	PAOK	Corinth
	Pellios 33' (o.g.)		Vasilakos 61', 90'; Koudas 82'	Stadium: Corinth Municipal Stadium; Attendance: 6,704; Referee: Kaklamanos
Note: Match held at Corinth because AEK had a stadium ban.

11 May 1983 28	PAOK	2–1	Ethnikos Piraeus	Thessaloniki
	Koudas 8'; Kostikos 40' (pen.)		Ilunga 19'	Stadium: Toumba Stadium; Attendance: 5,118; Referee: Kannos

22 May 1983 29	Rodos	0–2	PAOK	Rhodes
			Psarras 46'; Vasilakos 58' (penalty missed) 86'	Stadium: Diagoras Stadium; Attendance: 1,990; Referee: Kounalakis

29 May 1983 30	Kastoria	0–1	PAOK	Kastoria
			Guerino 80'	Stadium: Kastoria Municipal Stadium; Attendance: 1,364

5 June 1983 31	PAOK	2–0	Panserraikos	Thessaloniki
	Kostikos (penalty missed) 44'; Trimhold 55'; Vasilakos 88'		Pantazis (penalty missed) 72'	Stadium: Toumba Stadium; Referee: Koukoulakis

12 June 1983 32	Olympiacos	2–0	PAOK	Piraeus
	Anastopoulos 41'; Vamvakoulas 74'			Stadium: Karaiskakis Stadium; Attendance: 28,393

19 June 1983 33	PAOK	1–0	Panionios	Thessaloniki
	Guerino 87' (pen.)			Stadium: Toumba Stadium; Attendance: 5,529; Referee: Stamatis

26 June 1983 34	Panathinaikos	2–0	PAOK	Athens
	Kovis 20'; Mavridis 84'			Stadium: Leoforos Stadium; Attendance: 6,704

== Greek Cup ==
=== First round ===
15 December 1982	PAOK	7–0	Anagennisi Karditsa	Thessaloniki
	Trimhold 5', 83'; Georgopoulos 11'; Psarras 24'; Vasilakos 73'; Guerino 75'; Damanakis 77'			Stadium: Toumba Stadium; Attendance: 767

=== Additional round ===
26 January 1983	Almopos Aridea	0–3	PAOK	Aridaia
			Apostolidis 51'; Koudas 79'; Vasilakos 89'	Stadium: Aridea Municipal Stadium

=== Second round ===
16 February 1983	Vyzas Megara	1–3	PAOK	Megara
	Zografos 21'		Kostikos 50'; Dimopoulos 58'; Triantafyllidis 80'	Stadium: Megara Stadium

=== Third round ===
9 March 1983 1st leg	Ethnikos Alexandroupoli	0–2	PAOK	Alexandroupoli
	Poursitidis (penalty missed) 76'		Dimopoulos 31'; Koudas 36'	Stadium: Fotis Kosmas Stadium

13 April 1983 2nd leg	PAOK	4–0 (6–0 agg.)	Ethnikos Alexandroupoli	Thessaloniki
	Trimhold 9', 54'; Vasilakos 42'; Tsourelas 53'			Stadium: Toumba Stadium

=== Quarter-finals ===
18 May 1983 1st leg	Panargiakos	0–1	PAOK	Argos
			Triantafyllidis 45'	Stadium: Argos Municipal Stadium; Referee: Kapetanakis

1 June 1983 2nd leg	PAOK	2–0 (w/o) (3–0 agg.)	Panargiakos	Thessaloniki
				Stadium: Toumba Stadium
Note: Few days before the game Panargiakos were found guilty of attempted bribery and were expelled from domestic competitions (3rd division and Cup).

=== Semi-finals ===
15 June 1983 1st leg	PAOK	2–0	Rodos	Thessaloniki
	Kostikos 35', 48'		Papaoikonomou (penalty missed) 75'	Stadium: Toumba Stadium; Attendance: 5,573; Referee: Matsoukas

22 June 1983 2nd leg	Rodos	0–1 (0–3 agg.)	PAOK	Rhodes
			Papaoikonomou 66' (o.g.)	Stadium: Diagoras Stadium

=== Final ===
29 June 1983	AEK Athens	2–0	PAOK	Athens
21:00 EEST	Mavros 27'; Vlachos 80'			Stadium: Athens Olympic Stadium; Attendance: 72,240; Referee: Vassaras

== UEFA Cup ==
=== First round ===
15 September 1982 1st leg	PAOK (Greece)	1–0	(France) Sochaux	Thessaloniki, Greece
	Dimopoulos 80'			Stadium: Toumba Stadium; Attendance: 35,000; Referee: Adolf Prokop (East Germany)

29 September 1982 2nd leg	Sochaux (France)	2–1 (a.e.t.) (2–2 (a) agg.)	(Greece) PAOK	Montbéliard, France
	Anziani 90' (pen.), 98'		Dimopoulos 94'	Stadium: Stade Auguste Bonal; Attendance: 13,000; Referee: Ron Bridges (Wales)

=== Second round ===
20 October 1982 1st leg	PAOK (Greece)	2–0	(Spain) Sevilla	Thessaloniki, Greece
	Dimopoulos 49'; Kostikos 61'			Stadium: Toumba Stadium; Attendance: 37,000; Referee: Charles Corver (Netherlands)

3 November 1982 2nd leg	Sevilla (Spain)	4–0 (4–2 agg.)	(Greece) PAOK	Seville, Spain
	Santi 19'; López 39'; Magdaleno 56'; Pintinho 89'			Stadium: Estadio Ramón Sánchez Pizjuán; Attendance: 65,000; Referee: Vojtech Christov (Czechoslovakia)

== Statistics ==
=== Squad statistics ===
As of June 29, 1983

Appearances denote players in the starting lineup, with the numbers in parentheses denoting appearances as substitute.

No.	Name	Alpha Ethniki		Greek Cup		UEFA Cup		Total	
No.	Name	Apps	Goals	Apps	Goals	Apps	Goals	Apps	Goals
Goalkeepers
	(Socialist Federal Republic of Yugoslavia) Mladen Furtula	29	0	6	0	4	0	39	0
	(Greece) Takis Pantelis	7	0	3	0	0	0	10	0
Defenders
	(Greece) Giannis Psarras	31	1	7	1	4	0	42	2
	(Greece) Nikos Alavantas	30	1	7	0	4	0	41	1
	(Greece) Kostas Iosifidis	21	0	3	0	4	0	28	0
	(Greece) Theodoros Apostolidis	9	0	7	1	1	0	17	1
	(Greece) Apostolos Tsourelas	6	0	4	1	0	0	10	1
	(Greece) Stathis Apostolou	3	0	6	0	0	0	9	0
	(Greece) Filotas Pellios	3	0	1	0	0	0	4	0
	(Greece) Charis Baniotis	1	0	0	0	0	0	1	0
Midfielders
	(Greece) Georgios Skartados	32	2	7	0	4	0	43	2
	(Greece) Thomas Singas	30	0	5	0	4	0	39	0
	(Germany) Holger Trimhold	27	5	8	4	4	0	39	9
	(Greece) Ioannis Damanakis	26	2	8	1	2	0	36	3
	(Greece) Giorgos Koudas	28	4	3	2	4	0	35	6
	(Greece) Vasilis Georgopoulos	24	2	7	1	4	0	35	3
	(Greece) Vasilios Vasilakos	25	7	7	3	2	0	34	10
	(Greece) Stathis Triantafyllidis	16	5	7	2	0	0	23	7
	(Greece) Kyriakos Alexandridis	2	0	2	0	0	0	4	0
Forwards
	(Greece) Giorgos Kostikos	32	5	6	3	4	1	42	9
	(Greece) Christos Dimopoulos	30	11	5	2	4	3	39	16
	(Brazil) Neto Guerino	24	3	6	1	3	0	33	4

Source: Match reports in competitive matches, RSSSF

=== Goalscorers ===
Rank	No.	Pos.	Player	Alpha Ethniki	Greek Cup	UEFA Cup	Total
1		FW	(Greece) Christos Dimopoulos	11	2	3	16
2		MF	(Greece) Vasilios Vasilakos	7	3	0	10
3		FW	(Greece) Giorgos Kostikos	5	3	1	9
3		MF	(Germany) Holger Trimhold	5	4	0	9
5		MF	(Greece) Stathis Triantafyllidis	5	2	0	7
6		MF	(Greece) Giorgos Koudas	4	2	0	6
7		FW	(Brazil) Neto Guerino	3	1	0	4
8		MF	(Greece) Ioannis Damanakis	2	1	0	3
8		MF	(Greece) Vasilis Georgopoulos	2	1	0	3
10		MF	(Greece) Georgios Skartados	2	0	0	2
10		DF	(Greece) Giannis Psarras	1	1	0	2
12		DF	(Greece) Nikos Alavantas	1	0	0	1
12		DF	(Greece) Theodoros Apostolidis	0	1	0	1
12		DF	(Greece) Apostolos Tsourelas	0	1	0	1
Own goals				1	1	0	2
Walkover				0	2	0	2
TOTALS				49	25	4	78

Source: Match reports in competitive matches, RSSSF
