= 1981–82 PAOK FC season =

PAOK
1981–82 season
- President: Giorgos Pantelakis
- Manager: Heinz Höher
- Stadium: Toumba Stadium
- Alpha Ethniki: 3rd
- Greek Cup: Semi-finals
- UEFA Cup Winners' Cup: 1st round
- Top goalscorer: League: Kostikos (19); All: Kostikos (23)
- Highest home attendance: 38,774 vs Panathinaikos

The 1981–82 season was PAOK Football Club's 56th in existence and the club's 23rd consecutive season in the top flight of Greek football. The team entered the Greek Football Cup in first round and also participated in the UEFA Cup Winners' Cup.

== Players ==
=== Squad ===
Note: Flags indicate national team as defined under FIFA eligibility rules; some limited exceptions apply. Players may hold more than one non-FIFA nationality.

No.	Pos.	Nation	Player
—	GK	YUG	Mladen Furtula
—	GK	GRE	Takis Pantelis
—	DF	GRE	Kostas Iosifidis
—	DF	GRE	Ioannis Gounaris
—	DF	GRE	Nikos Alavantas
—	DF	GRE	Theodoros Apostolidis
—	DF	GRE	Filotas Pellios
—	DF	GRE	Apostolos Tsourelas
—	DF	GRE	Giannis Psarras
—	DF	HUN	József Salomon

No.	Pos.	Nation	Player
—	MF	GRE	Giorgos Koudas (captain)
—	MF	GRE	Ioannis Damanakis
—	MF	GRE	Thomas Singas
—	MF	GRE	Vasilis Georgopoulos
—	MF	GRE	Stathis Triantafyllidis
—	MF	GRE	Vassilis Vasilakos
—	MF	GRE	Kyriakos Alexandridis
—	FW	GRE	Giorgos Kostikos
—	FW	GRE	Christos Dimopoulos
—	FW	BRA	Neto Guerino

== Transfers ==
Players transferred in

Transfer Window	Pos.	Name	Club	Fee
Summer	GK	(Greece) Takis Pantelis	(Greece) Apollon Athens	7 million Dr.
Winter	DF	(Greece) Giannis Psarras	(Greece) Panachaiki	?

Players transferred out

Transfer Window	Pos.	Name	Club	Fee
Summer	GK	(Greece) Apostolos Filis	(Greece) Panelefsiniakos	Free
Summer	MF	(Greece) Angelos Anastasiadis	(Greece) Panathinaikos	Free
Summer	FW	(Greece) Panagiotis Kermanidis	(Greece) Makedonikos	Free
Summer	MF	(Greece) Stavros Sarafis		Retired

== Pre-season ==
Win Draw Loss

29 July 1981 Friendly	Fortuna Düsseldorf	2–1	PAOK	Neheim-Husten, West Germany
	5' (pen.); 30'		Guerino 65'

1 August 1981 Friendly	SV Leingarten	0–3	PAOK	Neheim-Husten, West Germany
			Dimopoulos 45', 60'; Alexandridis 87'

2 August 1981 Friendly	Weisweiler	2–3	PAOK	Neheim-Husten, West Germany
			Alavantas 20'; Apostolidis 45'; Gounaris 70'

4 August 1981 Friendly	SC Neheim	0–3	PAOK	Neheim-Husten, West Germany
			Triantafyllidis 16'; Vasilakos 35' (pen.); Dimopoulos 70'

7 August 1981 Friendly	SV Wehen Wiesbaden	0–8	PAOK	Neheim-Husten, West Germany
			Damanakis; Vasilakos; Dimopoulos; Alavantas; Apostolidis

12 August 1981 Friendly	PAOK	2–2	Aris	Thessaloniki
	Singas 39'; Damanakis 41'		Zindros 45'; Zelelidis 57'	Stadium: Toumba Stadium; Referee: Tikmoglou

17 August 1981 Friendly	PAOK	0–1	Doxa Drama	Thessaloniki
			Strantzalis 46'	Stadium: Toumba Stadium; Referee: Giorgos Moschopoulos (Thessaloniki)

20 August 1981 Friendly	PAOK	2–2	AEK Athens	Thessaloniki
21:00 EEST	Kostikos 4' (pen.); Iosifidis 88'		Dintsikos 16'; Ardizoglou 19'	Stadium: Toumba Stadium; Attendance: 10,126; Referee: Giorgos Pournatzis (Thessaloniki)

23 August 1981 Friendly	Pierikos	2–1	PAOK	Katerini
	23'; Anagnostou 70'		Vasilakos 55'	Stadium: Katerini Stadium

26 August 1981 Friendly	PAOK	2–1	Greece	Thessaloniki
	Georgopoulos 44'; Triantafyllidis 75'		Papaioannou 85'	Stadium: Toumba Stadium; Attendance: 8,550; Referee: Giasoglou
Note: Match in honour of Stavros Sarafis who ended his football career.

30 August 1981 Friendly	Olympiacos	2–1	PAOK	Piraeus
	Lemonis 58' (pen.); Gregory 60'		Triantafyllidis 85'	Stadium: Karaiskakis Stadium; Referee: Vourakis

== Competitions ==
=== Overview ===
Competition	Record							
Competition	Pld	W	D	L	GF	GA	GD	Win %
Alpha Ethniki	34	18	10	6	55	22	+33	52.94
Greek Cup	7	4	1	2	15	8	+7	57.14
Cup Winners' Cup	2	1	0	1	2	2	+0	50.00
Total	43	23	11	9	72	32	+40	53.49

Source: Competitions

== Alpha Ethniki ==
=== Standings ===
Pos	Team	Pld	W	D	L	GF	GA	GD	Pts	Qualification or relegation
1	Olympiacos (C)	34	18	14	2	46	21	+25	50 (Note: Championship play–off: Olympiacos–Panathinaikos 2–1 (see below).)	Qualification for European Cup first round
2	Panathinaikos	34	19	12	3	58	28	+30	50	Qualification for Cup Winners' Cup first round
3	PAOK	34	18	10	6	55	22	+33	46	Qualification for UEFA Cup first round
4	AEK Athens	34	17	11	6	54	36	+18	45	Qualification for UEFA Cup first round
5	Aris	34	15	11	8	56	30	+26	41	

Source: RSSSF
Rules for classification: 1st points; 2nd decision match; 3rd head-to-head goal difference.
(C) Champions

==== Results summary ====
Overall								Home						Away					
Pld	W	D	L	GF	GA	GD	Pts	W	D	L	GF	GA	GD	W	D	L	GF	GA	GD
34	18	10	6	55	22	+33	64	14	3	0	42	8	+34	4	7	6	13	14	−1

Last updated: 30 May 1982.
Source: Competitive matches

==== Results by round ====
Round	1	2	3	4	5	6	7	8	9	10	11	12	13	14	15	16	17	18	19	20	21	22	23	24	25	26	27	28	29	30	31	32	33	34
Ground	A	H	A	H	A	H	A	A	H	A	H	A	H	A	H	H	A	H	A	H	A	H	A	H	H	A	H	A	H	A	H	A	A	H
Result	D	D	W	W	L	W	D	W	D	L	W	L	W	D	W	W	D	W	D	W	W	W	L	W	W	D	W	D	W	L	D	W	L	W
Position	11	13	8	3	5	2	5	4	4	5	3	5	4	4	3	2	3	2	3	3	3	1	3	3	3	3	3	3	3	3	3	3	3	3

Source: League matches
A = Away; H = Home; W = Win; D = Draw; L = Loss

==== Matches ====
Win Draw Loss

6 September 1981 1	PAS Giannina	0–0	PAOK	Ioannina
	Kontogeorgakis (penalty missed) 8'			Stadium: Zosimades Stadium; Referee: Machaliotis

13 September 1981 2	PAOK	0–0	Kastoria	Katerini
				Stadium: Katerini Stadium; Attendance: 5,601; Referee: Dedes
Note: Game held at Katerini because PAOK had a stadium ban for the eventful 1981 Greek Cup final against Olympiacos.

20 September 1981 3	OFI	0–1	PAOK	Heraklion
			Dimopoulos 85'	Stadium: Theodoros Vardinogiannis Stadium; Attendance: 6,132; Referee: Stamatis

27 September 1981 4	PAOK	3–1	Doxa Drama	Thessaloniki
	Koudas 64'; Tsevretzis 76' (o.g.); Dimopoulos 81'		Pantelidis 24'	Stadium: Toumba Stadium; Attendance: 13,196; Referee: Vardakas

4 October 1981 5	Rodos	2–1	PAOK	Rhodes
	Papaoikonomou 7' (pen.); Rigas 44'		Kostikos 86'	Stadium: Diagoras Stadium; Referee: Platopoulos

25 October 1981 6	PAOK	2–0	Panathinaikos	Thessaloniki
	Iosifidis 57'; Kostikos 86'			Stadium: Toumba Stadium; Attendance: 20,257; Referee: Kosmopoulos

1 November 1981 7	Panionios	1–1	PAOK	Athens
	Mandonis 42'		Damanakis 83'	Stadium: Nea Smyrni Stadium; Referee: Argyriou

8 November 1981 8	Kavala	1–2	PAOK	Kavala
	Katrakylakis 89'		Koudas 8'; Dimopoulos 86'	Stadium: Kavala Stadium; Attendance: 3,664; Referee: Tsolakis

22 November 1981 9	PAOK	2–2	Iraklis	Thessaloniki
	Dimopoulos 61', 73'; Georgopoulos (red card) 65'		Xanthopoulos 35'; Alexiadis 50'	Stadium: Toumba Stadium; Attendance: 20,126; Referee: Voulgaris

6 December 1981 10	Apollon Athens	1–0	PAOK	Athens
	Pathiakakis 18'			Stadium: Rizoupoli Stadium; Referee: Anastasiadis

13 December 1981 11	PAOK	3–0	Olympiacos	Thessaloniki
	Dimopoulos 8', 45'; Vamvakoulas 46' (o.g.)			Stadium: Toumba Stadium; Attendance: 22,744; Referee: Koutoulas

20 December 1981 12	Aris	2–1	PAOK	Thessaloniki
	Charalambidis 35'; Kouis 60'		Kostikos 41' (pen.)	Stadium: Kleanthis Vikelidis Stadium; Attendance: 23,182; Referee: Kyfonidis

27 December 1981 13	PAOK	3–0	AEL	Thessaloniki
	Kostikos 37' (pen.), 78', 87'			Stadium: Toumba Stadium; Attendance: 6,143; Referee: Kounelakis

3 January 1982 14	AEK Athens	1–1	PAOK	Athens
	Radonjić 24'		Koudas 69'	Stadium: Nikos Goumas Stadium; Attendance: 23,915; Referee: Dimitriadis

10 January 1982 15	PAOK	5–1	Ethnikos Piraeus	Thessaloniki
	Singas 10'; Seitaridis 24' (o.g.); Kostikos 31', 41', 81' (penalty missed) 81'		Kotidis 44'	Stadium: Toumba Stadium; Attendance: 9,879; Referee: Germanakos

17 January 1982 16	PAOK	4–0	Panserraikos	Thessaloniki
	Damanakis 58', 77'; Kostikos 73', 85'			Stadium: Toumba Stadium; Attendance: 12,539; Referee: Printezis

24 January 1982 17	Korinthos	0–0	PAOK	Corinth
				Stadium: Corinth Municipal Stadium; Referee: Saraliotis

31 January 1982 18	PAOK	2–1	PAS Giannina	Thessaloniki
	Guerino 30'; Triantafyllidis 79'		Papageorgiou 84'	Stadium: Toumba Stadium; Attendance: 9,553; Referee: Giannakoudakis

7 February 1982 19	Kastoria	1–1	PAOK	Kastoria
	Tsironis 14'		Dimopoulos 31'	Stadium: Kastoria Stadium; Attendance: 5,821; Referee: Dimitriadis

14 February 1982 20	PAOK	2–0	OFI	Thessaloniki
	Koudas 13'; Singas 16'			Stadium: Toumba Stadium; Attendance: 9,118; Referee: Karathanasis

21 February 1982 21	Doxa Drama	0–1	PAOK	Drama
			Kostikos 25'	Stadium: Doxa Drama Stadium; Attendance: 5,803; Referee: Printezis

28 February 1982 22	PAOK	5–0	Rodos	Thessaloniki
	Kostikos 35', 41', 63', 68'; Singas 55'			Stadium: Toumba Stadium; Attendance: 8,150; Referee: Tsolakis

7 March 1982 23	Panathinaikos	2–1	PAOK	Athens
	Kouropoulos 63'; Galakos 74'		Dimopoulos 50'	Stadium: Leoforos Stadium; Attendance: 24,000; Referee: Koukoulakis

14 March 1982 24	PAOK	2–1	Panionios	Thessaloniki
	Dimopoulos 14'; Kostikos 52'		Papazoglou 8'	Stadium: Toumba Stadium; Attendance: 11,512; Referee: Tsouris

21 March 1982 25	PAOK	3–1	Kavala	Thessaloniki
	Koudas 11'; Dimopoulos 33'; Kostikos 60'		Filippidis 73'	Stadium: Toumba Stadium; Attendance: 5,694; Referee: Loutridis

28 March 1982 26	Iraklis	0–0	PAOK	Thessaloniki
				Stadium: Kaftanzoglio Stadium; Attendance: 36,692; Referee: Sidiropoulos

4 April 1982 27	PAOK	3–0	Apollon Athens	Thessaloniki
	Iosifidis 29'; Tsourelas 52'; Vasilakos 80'			Stadium: Toumba Stadium; Attendance: 8,547; Referee: Kyfonidis

11 April 1982 28	Olympiacos	0–0	PAOK	Piraeus
				Stadium: Karaiskakis Stadium; Attendance: 35,450; Referee: Anastasopoulos

25 April 1982 29	PAOK	1–0	Aris	Thessaloniki
	Dimopoulos 43'			Stadium: Toumba Stadium; Attendance: 26,499; Referee: Vassaras

2 May 1982 30	AEL	1–0	PAOK	Larissa
	Maloumidis 35' (pen.)		Tsourelas (red card) 51'	Stadium: Alcazar Stadium; Attendance: 9,441; Referee: Kolokythas

9 May 1982 31	PAOK	1–1	AEK Athens	Thessaloniki
	Georgopoulos 26'		Mavros 76'	Stadium: Toumba Stadium; Attendance: 15,706; Referee: Stamatis

16 May 1982 32	Ethnikos Piraeus	0–2	PAOK	Piraeus
			Pellios 61'; Singas 73'	Stadium: Karaiskakis Stadium; Attendance: 3,772; Referee: Vardakas

23 May 1982 33	Panserraikos	2–1	PAOK	Serres
	Papadimitriou 29'; Batis 56' (pen.)		Dimopoulos 21'	Stadium: Serres Municipal Stadium; Attendance: 5,190; Referee: Germanakos

30 May 1982 34	PAOK	1–0	Korinthos	Thessaloniki
	Guerino 47'; Kostikos (penalty missed) 34' (penalty missed) 40'			Stadium: Toumba Stadium; Attendance: 3,005; Referee: Saraliotis

== Greek Cup ==
=== First round ===
23 December 1981	PAOK	4–1	Panachaiki	Thessaloniki
	Kostikos 18' (pen.), 55'; Dimopoulos 20', 34'		Apostolidis 59'	Stadium: Toumba Stadium; Referee: Kounalakis

=== Second round ===
Bye

=== Third round ===
3 February 1982 1st leg	PAOK	6–1	AEK Athens	Thessaloniki
	Koudas 8'; Dimopoulos 27', 52', 72'; Guerino 66'; Singas 69'		Mavros 25'	Stadium: Toumba Stadium; Attendance: 19,550; Referee: Tsolakis

24 February 1982 2nd leg	AEK Athens	2–2 (3–8 agg.)	PAOK	Athens
	Mavros (penalty missed) 25' 81'; Nikolaou 60'		Dimopoulos 30', 53'	Stadium: Nikos Goumas Stadium; Attendance: 7,117; Referee: Anastasiadis

=== Quarter-finals ===
31 March 1982 1st leg	PAOK	1–0	Panionios	Thessaloniki
	Damanakis 10'; Kostikos (penalty missed) 85'		Papamichail (red card) 23'	Stadium: Toumba Stadium; Referee: Argyriou

28 April 1982 2nd leg	Panionios	2–1 (2–2 (a) agg.)	PAOK	Athens
	Saravakos 26'; Papadimitriou (red card) 64'; Baso 75'		Singas 29'; Damanakis (red card) 64'	Stadium: Nea Smyrni Stadium; Attendance: 9,334; Referee: Dimitriadis

=== Semi-finals ===
19 May 1982 1st leg	PAOK	1–0	Panathinaikos	Thessaloniki
	Koudas 82'		Nicolae (red card) 73'	Stadium: Toumba Stadium; Attendance: 38,774; Referee: Tsolakis

2 June 1982 2nd leg	Panathinaikos	2–0 (2–1 agg.)	PAOK	Athens
	Dokken 50'; Karoulias (red card) 76'; Charalambidis 89'		Gounaris (red card) 70'	Stadium: Leoforos Stadium; Attendance: 24,000; Referee: Kyfonidis

== UEFA Cup Winners' Cup ==
=== First round ===
16 September 1981 1st leg	Eintracht Frankfurt (West Germany)	2–0	(Greece) PAOK	Frankfurt, West Germany
	Pezzey 12'; Körbel 78'	Report		Stadium: Waldstadion; Referee: Bob Valentine (Scotland)

30 September 1981 2nd leg	PAOK (Greece)	2–0 (a.e.t.) (2–2 agg.) (4–5 p)	(West Germany) Eintracht Frankfurt	Thessaloniki, Greece
	Kostikos 37', 63'	Report		Stadium: Toumba Stadium; Attendance: 35,000; Referee: Sándor Kuti (Hungary)
	Penalties
	Kostikos (penalty scored); Guerino (penalty scored); Gounaris (penalty scored); Singas (penalty scored); Dimopoulos (penalty missed)		(penalty scored) Lorant; (penalty scored) Körbel; (penalty scored) Trapp; (penalty scored) Nachtweih; (penalty scored) Pezzey

== Statistics ==
=== Squad statistics ===
As of June 2, 1982

Appearances denote players in the starting lineup, with the numbers in parentheses denoting appearances as substitute.

No.	Name	Alpha Ethniki		Greek Cup		UEFA CWC		Total	
No.	Name	Apps	Goals	Apps	Goals	Apps	Goals	Apps	Goals
Goalkeepers
	(Greece) Takis Pantelis	20	0	2	0	2	0	24	0
	(Socialist Federal Republic of Yugoslavia) Mladen Furtula	15	0	5	0	0	0	20	0
Defenders
	(Greece) Kostas Iosifidis	33	2	7	0	2	0	42	2
	(Greece) Ioannis Gounaris	33	0	7	0	2	0	42	0
	(Greece) Nikos Alavantas	32	0	6	0	2	0	40	0
	(Greece) Theodoros Apostolidis	19	0	4	0	1	0	24	0
	(Greece) Giannis Psarras	17	0	3	0	0	0	20	0
	(Greece) Filotas Pellios	10	1	4	0	0	0	14	1
	(Greece) Apostolos Tsourelas	9	1	0	0	0	0	9	1
Midfielders
	(Greece) Thomas Singas	33	4	7	2	2	0	42	6
	(Greece) Ioannis Damanakis	31	3	7	1	2	0	40	4
	(Greece) Giorgos Koudas	32	5	5	2	2	0	39	7
	(Greece) Vasilis Georgopoulos	25	1	7	0	2	0	34	1
	(Greece) Stathis Triantafyllidis	25	1	6	0	2	0	33	1
	(Greece) Vassilis Vasilakos	3	1	0	0	0	0	3	1
Forwards
	(Greece) Giorgos Kostikos	34	18	7	2	2	2	43	22
	(Greece) Christos Dimopoulos	32	13	6	7	1	0	39	20
	(Brazil) Neto Guerino	22	2	4	1	1	0	27	3

Source: Match reports in competitive matches, RSSSF

=== Goalscorers ===
Rank	No.	Pos.	Player	Alpha Ethniki	Greek Cup	UEFA CWC	Total
1		FW	(Greece) Giorgos Kostikos	18	2	2	22
2		FW	(Greece) Christos Dimopoulos	13	7	0	20
3		MF	(Greece) Giorgos Koudas	5	2	0	7
4		MF	(Greece) Thomas Singas	4	2	0	6
5		MF	(Greece) Ioannis Damanakis	3	1	0	4
6		FW	(Brazil) Neto Guerino	2	1	0	3
7		DF	(Greece) Kostas Iosifidis	2	0	0	2
8		MF	(Greece) Vasilis Georgopoulos	1	0	0	1
8		MF	(Greece) Stathis Triantafyllidis	1	0	0	1
8		DF	(Greece) Filotas Pellios	1	0	0	1
8		DF	(Greece) Apostolos Tsourelas	1	0	0	1
8		MF	(Greece) Vassilis Vasilakos	1	0	0	1
Own goals				2	0	0	3
TOTALS				55	15	2	72

Source: Match reports in competitive matches, RSSSF
