= 1983–84 PAOK FC season =

PAOK
1983–84 season
- President: Giorgos Pantelakis
- Manager: Pál Csernai
- Stadium: Toumba Stadium
- Alpha Ethniki: 5th
- Greek Cup: Quarter-finals
- UEFA Cup: 2nd round
- Top goalscorer: League: Christos Dimopoulos (9); All: Christos Dimopoulos (11)
- Highest home attendance: 34,256 vs Panathinaikos

The 1983–84 season was PAOK Football Club's 57th in existence and the club's 25th consecutive season in the top flight of Greek football. The team entered the Greek Football Cup in first round and also participated in the UEFA Cup.

== Players ==
=== Squad ===
Note: Flags indicate national team as defined under FIFA eligibility rules; some limited exceptions apply. Players may hold more than one non-FIFA nationality.

No.	Pos.	Nation	Player
—	GK	YUG	Mladen Furtula
—	GK	GRE	Takis Pantelis
—	DF	GRE	Kostas Iosifidis
—	DF	GRE	Nikos Alavantas
—	DF	GRE	Giannis Psarras
—	DF	GRE	Theodoros Apostolidis
—	DF	GRE	Apostolos Tsourelas
—	DF	GRE	Charis Baniotis
—	DF	GRE	Kostas Malioufas
—	DF	GRE	Filotas Pellios
—	DF	GRE	Stathis Apostolou
—	MF	GRE	Giorgos Koudas (captain)
—	MF	GRE	Ioannis Damanakis

No.	Pos.	Nation	Player
—	MF	GRE	Thomas Singas
—	MF	GRE	Georgios Skartados
—	MF	GER	Holger Trimhold
—	MF	GRE	Vasilios Vasilakos
—	MF	GRE	Vasilis Georgopoulos
—	MF	GRE	Kyriakos Alexandridis
—	MF	GRE	Sotiris Mavromatis
—	FW	GRE	Giorgos Kostikos
—	FW	GRE	Christos Dimopoulos
—	FW	BRA	Neto Guerino

== Transfers ==
Players transferred in

Transfer Window	Pos.	Name	Club	Fee
Summer	MF	(Greece) Sotiris Mavromatis	(Greece) Ethnikos Alexandroupoli	?

Players transferred out

Transfer Window	Pos.	Name	Club	Fee
Summer	MF	(Greece) Stathis Triantafyllidis		Released
Winter	FW	(Brazil) Neto Guerino	(Greece) Apollon Kalamaria	Free

== Pre-season ==
Win Draw Loss

3 August 1983 Friendly	SC Neheim	0–1	PAOK	West Germany
			Trimhold 50'

5 August 1983 Friendly	Rot-Weiß Lüdenscheid	2–2	PAOK	West Germany
			Alexandridis 47'; Koudas 83'

8 August 1983 Friendly	SC Preußen Münster	0–2	PAOK	West Germany
			Kostikos 35'; Georgopoulos 66'

12 August 1983 Friendly	Meschede	0–6	PAOK	West Germany
			Georgopoulos 6'; Kostikos 12'; Vasilakos 34'; Siggas 56'; Dimopoulos 70', 85'

17 August 1983 Friendly	PAOK	2–0	Aris	Thessaloniki
	Koudas 54'; Kostikos 56'			Stadium: Toumba Stadium; Attendance: 16,679

19 August 1983 Friendly	PAOK	1–1	Iraklis	Thessaloniki
	Guerino 20'		Papadopoulos 2'	Stadium: Toumba Stadium; Attendance: 10,061; Referee: Kantartzis

23 August 1983 Friendly	PAOK	0–1	Olympiacos	Thessaloniki
			Togias 69'	Stadium: Toumba Stadium

26 August 1983 Friendly	PAOK	1–1	Makedonikos	Thessaloniki
	Guerino 87'		Kermanidis 41'	Stadium: Toumba Stadium; Referee: Sampsonidis

28 August 1983 Friendly	Panathinaikos	2–0	PAOK	Athens
	Th.Dimopoulos 31'; Konstantinidis 77'			Stadium: Leoforos Stadium

== Competitions ==
=== Overview ===
Competition	Record							
Competition	Pld	W	D	L	GF	GA	GD	Win %
Alpha Ethniki	30	11	13	6	33	29	+4	36.67
Greek Cup	7	3	3	1	12	7	+5	42.86
UEFA Cup	4	2	2	0	5	2	+3	50.00
Total	41	16	18	7	50	38	+12	39.02

Source: Competitions

== Alpha Ethniki ==
=== Standings ===
Pos	Team	Pld	W	D	L	GF	GA	GD	Pts	Qualification or relegation
3	Iraklis	30	16	10	4	47	20	+27	42	
4	Aris	30	16	7	7	39	23	+16	39	
5	PAOK	30	11	13	6	33	29	+4	35	
6	AEL	30	13	6	11	28	29	−1	32	Qualification for Cup Winners' Cup first round (Note: Since Panathinaikos, winners of 1983–84 Greek Football Cup, was qualified for the 1984–85 European Cup, losing cup finalists AEL earned a spot in the first round of the 1984–85 European Cup Winners' Cup.)
7	AEK Athens	30	12	6	12	40	31	+9	30	

Source: RSSSF
Rules for classification: 1st points; 2nd decision match; 3rd head-to-head goal difference.

==== Results summary ====
Overall								Home						Away					
Pld	W	D	L	GF	GA	GD	Pts	W	D	L	GF	GA	GD	W	D	L	GF	GA	GD
30	11	13	6	33	29	+4	46	8	6	1	24	10	+14	3	7	5	9	19	−10

Last updated: 6 May 1983.
Source: Competitive matches

==== Results by round ====
Round	1	2	3	4	5	6	7	8	9	10	11	12	13	14	15	16	17	18	19	20	21	22	23	24	25	26	27	28	29	30
Ground	A	H	A	H	A	H	A	A	H	A	H	A	H	H	A	H	A	H	A	H	A	H	H	A	H	A	H	A	A	H
Result	W	W	D	W	D	W	D	D	D	D	D	D	D	W	L	W	L	W	L	L	L	D	W	W	W	W	D	L	D	D
Position	4	3	3	3	3	3	3	3	3	4	4	5	4	4	5	4	5	4	5	5	5	5	5	5	5	5	5	5	5	5

Source: League matches
A = Away; H = Home; W = Win; D = Draw; L = Loss

==== Matches ====
Win Draw Loss

4 September 1983 1	Apollon Kalamaria	2–3	PAOK	Thessaloniki
	Chatzieleftheriou 60', 68' (pen.)		Siggas 24'; Kostikos 35'; Alexandridis 49'	Stadium: Kleanthis Vikelidis Stadium; Attendance: 15,616; Referee: Kannos

11 September 1983 2	PAOK	1–0	AEK Athens	Serres
	Kostikos 30'			Stadium: Serres Municipal Stadium; Attendance: 11,886; Referee: Triantafyllou
Note: Game held at Serres because PAOK had a stadium ban for the eventful 1983 Greek Cup final against AEK.

18 September 1983 3	Panionios	2–2	PAOK	Athens
	Lazarou 44'; Saravakos 62'		Dimopoulos 26', 49'	Stadium: Nea Smyrni Stadium

25 September 1983 4	PAOK	4–0	Olympiacos	Serres
	Dimopoulos 10'; Koudas 35'; Skartados 54'; Kostikos 64'			Stadium: Serres Municipal Stadium; Attendance: 13,138
Note: Game held at Serres because PAOK had a stadium ban for the eventful 1983 Greek Cup final against AEK.

2 October 1983 5	Aris	0–0	PAOK	Thessaloniki
				Stadium: Kleanthis Vikelidis Stadium; Attendance: 24,099; Referee: Pounartzis

9 October 1983 6	PAOK	1–0	OFI	Thessaloniki
	Kostikos 20'			Stadium: Toumba Stadium; Attendance: 7,466; Referee: Anastasiadis

16 October 1983 7	Egaleo	1–1	PAOK	Athens
	Bekiaris 31'		Dimopoulos 51'	Stadium: Stavros Mavrothalassitis Stadium; Attendance: 9,301; Referee: Georgiadis

23 October 1983 8	Doxa Drama	0–0	PAOK	Drama
				Stadium: Doxa Drama Stadium; Attendance: 6,342; Referee: Germanakos

30 October 1983 9	PAOK	0–0	Iraklis	Thessaloniki
			Karaiskos (red card) 76'	Stadium: Toumba Stadium; Attendance: 20,785; Referee: Kolokythas

6 November 1983 10	Panathinaikos	0–0	PAOK	Athens
				Stadium: Leoforos Stadium; Attendance: 24,400

20 November 1983 11	PAOK	2–2	Panserraikos	Thessaloniki
	Dimopoulos 23', 55' (pen.)		Pantazis 35', 57'	Stadium: Toumba Stadium; Attendance: 6,791

27 November 1983 12	AEL	1–1	PAOK	Larissa
	Kmiecik 17' (pen.)		Psarras (red card) 64'; Dimopoulos 80'	Stadium: Alcazar Stadium; Attendance: 11,015; Referee: Germanakos

11 December 1983 13	PAOK	0–0	PAS Giannina	Thessaloniki
				Stadium: Toumba Stadium; Attendance: 5,061; Referee: Koutoulas

18 December 1983 14	PAOK	3–2	Apollon Athens	Thessaloniki
	Koudas 28'; Skartados 52'; Dimopoulos 83'		Rammos 63'; Darras 74'	Stadium: Toumba Stadium; Attendance: 8,055

8 January 1984 15	Ethnikos Piraeus	3–0	PAOK	Piraeus
	Pittas 9'; Kotidis 76'; Liolios 88'			Stadium: Karaiskakis Stadium; Attendance: 11,015

30 January 1983 16	PAOK	4–0	Apollon Kalamaria	Thessaloniki
	Psarras 29'; Trimhold 59'; Dimopoulos 63' (pen.); Georgopoulos 88'			Stadium: Toumba Stadium; Attendance: 8,055; Referee: Batras

22 January 1984 17	AEK Athens	4–0	PAOK	Athens
	Mavros 26' (pen.); Dintsikos 28'; Manolas 41'; Ardizoglou 65'			Stadium: Nikos Goumas Stadium; Attendance: 14,517; Referee: Dimitriadis

29 January 1984 18	PAOK	1–0	Panionios	Thessaloniki
	Psarras 25'			Stadium: Toumba Stadium; Attendance: 8,156

5 February 1984 19	Olympiacos	1–0	PAOK	Piraeus
	Anastopoulos 32'			Stadium: Karaiskakis Stadium; Attendance: 25,032

27 February 1983 20	PAOK	0–1	Aris	Thessaloniki
			Semertzidis 56'	Stadium: Toumba Stadium; Attendance: 12,453; Referee: Koutoulas

19 February 1984 21	OFI	4–0	PAOK	Heraklion
	Vlastos 30', 34'; Kariotis 47'; Christofis 89'			Stadium: Theodoros Vardinogiannis Stadium; Attendance: 5,024; Referee: Loukidis

26 February 1984 22	PAOK	0–0	Egaleo	Thessaloniki
				Stadium: Toumba Stadium; Attendance: 2,960

4 March 1984 23	PAOK	3–1	Doxa Drama	Thessaloniki
	Georgopoulos 6'; Kostikos 11', 16'		Yfantidis 5' (pen.)	Stadium: Toumba Stadium; Attendance: 3,808; Referee: Kardonas

11 March 1984 24	Iraklis	0–1	PAOK	Thessaloniki
			Kostikos 58' (pen.)	Stadium: Kaftanzoglio Stadium; Attendance: 31,091; Referee: Voutsaras

18 March 1984 25	PAOK	1–0	Panathinaikos	Thessaloniki
	Kapsis 14' (o.g.)			Stadium: Toumba Stadium; Attendance: 34,256; Referee: Dimitriadis

1 April 1984 26	Panserraikos	0–1	PAOK	Serres
	Tosić (red card) 72'		Kostikos (red card) 14'; Psarras 78'	Stadium: Serres Municipal Stadium; Attendance: 7,325; Referee: Kolokythas

8 April 1984 27	PAOK	2–2	AEL	Thessaloniki
	Psarras 39'; Apostolou 60'		Ziogas 16', 57'	Stadium: Toumba Stadium; Referee: Germanakos

15 April 1984 28	PAS Giannina	1–0	PAOK	Ioannina
	Katsifas 10'			Stadium: Zosimades Stadium; Attendance: 7,560

29 April 1984 29	Apollon Athens	0–0	PAOK	Athens
				Stadium: Rizoupoli Stadium; Attendance: 2,230

6 May 1984 30	PAOK	2–2	Ethnikos Piraeus	Thessaloniki
	Skartados 14'; Malioufas 23'		Batsinilas 43', 79'	Stadium: Kaftanzoglio Stadium; Attendance: 3,694; Referee: Koutoulas
Note: Game held at Kaftanzoglio Stadium because there were repair and maintenance works at Toumba Stadium.

== Greek Cup ==
=== First round ===
21 December 1983	Proodeftiki	0–1	PAOK	Athens
			Kostikos 78'	Stadium: Nikaia Municipal Stadium; Referee: Koukoulakis

=== Second round ===
25 January 1984 1st leg	Niki Volos	2–2	PAOK	Volos
	Katsikas 18'; Katianos 32' (pen.)		Skartados 29'; Kostikos 67'

22 February 1984 2nd leg	PAOK	4–0 (6–2 agg.)	Niki Volos	Thessaloniki
	Skartados 20' (pen.); Trimhold 24'; Apostolou 69', 78'			Stadium: Toumba Stadium; Referee: Landrakis

=== Third round ===
21 March 1984 1st leg	Anagennisi Arta	1–1	PAOK	Arta
	Petas 15'		Malioufas 10'	Stadium: Arta Stadium; Attendance: 5,850; Referee: Megas

4 April 1984 2nd leg	PAOK	3–0 (4–1 agg.)	Anagennisi Arta	Thessaloniki
	Malioufas 11', 73', 79' (pen.)			Stadium: Toumba Stadium; Referee: Koukoulakis

=== Quarter-finals ===
9 May 1984 1st leg	PAOK	0–0	Iraklis	Thessaloniki
				Stadium: Kleanthis Vikelidis Stadium; Attendance: 17,091
Note: Game held at Kleanthis Vikelidis Stadium because there were repair and maintenance works at Toumba Stadium.

23 May 1984 2nd leg	Iraklis	4–1 (4–1 agg.)	PAOK	Thessaloniki
	Kofidis 25'; Papaioannou 61'; Hatzipanagis 79'; Karaiskos 83'		Malioufas 88'	Stadium: Kaftanzoglio Stadium; Attendance: 23,963

== UEFA Cup ==
=== First round ===
14 September 1983 1st leg	Lokomotiv Plovdiv (Bulgaria)	1–2	(Greece) PAOK	Plovdiv, Bulgaria
	Sadakov 72' (pen.)		Dimopoulos 42'; Georgopoulos 48'	Stadium: Stadion Lokomotiv; Referee: Karl-Heinz Tritschler (West Germany)

28 September 1983 2nd leg	PAOK (Greece)	3–1 (5–2 agg.)	(Bulgaria) Lokomotiv Plovdiv	Thessaloniki, Greece
	Kostikos 44'; Skartados 66'; Dimopoulos 75' (pen.)		Eranosyan 13'	Stadium: Toumba Stadium; Referee: Károly Palotai (Hungary)

=== Second round ===
19 October 1983 1st leg	PAOK (Greece)	0–0	(West Germany) Bayern Munich	Thessaloniki, Greece
				Stadium: Toumba Stadium; Attendance: 33,500; Referee: Gino Menicucci (Italy)

2 November 1983 2nd leg	Bayern Munich (West Germany)	0–0 (a.e.t.) (0–0 agg.) (9–8 p)	(Greece) PAOK	Munich, West Germany
				Stadium: Olympiastadion; Attendance: 30,000; Referee: Alan Robinson (England)
	Penalties
	Augenthaler (penalty scored); Hoeneß (penalty missed); Kraus (penalty scored); Nachtweih (penalty scored); Lerby (penalty scored); Del'Haye (penalty scored); Dürnberger (penalty scored); M. Rummenigge (penalty scored); Pflügler (penalty scored); Pfaff (penalty scored)		(penalty scored) Kostikos; (penalty scored) Dimopoulos; (penalty scored) Skartados; (penalty scored) Vasilakos; (penalty missed) Damanakis; (penalty scored) Alavantas; (penalty scored) Alexandridis; (penalty scored) Psarras; (penalty scored) Baniotis; (penalty missed) Malioufas

== Statistics ==
=== Squad statistics ===
As of May 23, 1984

Appearances denote players in the starting lineup, with the numbers in parentheses denoting appearances as substitute.

No.	Name	Alpha Ethniki		Greek Cup		UEFA Cup		Total	
No.	Name	Apps	Goals	Apps	Goals	Apps	Goals	Apps	Goals
Goalkeepers
	(Socialist Federal Republic of Yugoslavia) Mladen Furtula	24	0	6	0	4	0	34	0
	(Greece) Takis Pantelis	6	0	1	0	0	0	7	0
Defenders
	(Greece) Nikos Alavantas	29	0	6	0	4	0	39	0
	(Greece) Giannis Psarras	25	4	6	0	4	0	35	4
	(Greece) Charis Baniotis	26	0	6	0	3	0	35	0
	(Greece) Kostas Iosifidis	17	0	6	0	0	0	23	0
	(Greece) Apostolos Tsourelas	13	0	6	0	1	0	20	0
	(Greece) Kostas Malioufas	7	1	6	5	1	0	14	6
	(Greece) Stathis Apostolou	6	1	5	2	0	0	11	3
	(Greece) Theodoros Apostolidis	5	0	0	0	1	0	6	0
	(Greece) Filotas Pellios	1	0	0	0	0	0	1	0
Midfielders
	(Greece) Kyriakos Alexandridis	30	1	5	0	4	0	39	1
	(Greece) Georgios Skartados	27	3	7	2	4	1	38	6
	(Greece) Vasilis Georgopoulos	26	2	7	0	4	1	37	3
	(Greece) Ioannis Damanakis	28	0	6	0	3	0	37	0
	(Greece) Giorgos Koudas	21	2	4	0	4	0	29	2
	(Germany) Holger Trimhold	15	1	2	1	1	0	18	2
	(Greece) Vasilios Vasilakos	10	0	1	0	1	0	12	0
	(Greece) Thomas Singas	5	1	2	0	1	0	8	1
Forwards
	(Greece) Georgios Kostikos	27	7	5	2	4	1	36	10
	(Greece) Christos Dimopoulos	18	9	1	0	4	2	23	11
	(Brazil) Neto Guerino	2	0	0	0	2	0	4	0

Source: Match reports in competitive matches, RSSSF

=== Goalscorers ===
Rank	No.	Pos.	Player	Alpha Ethniki	Greek Cup	UEFA Cup	Total
1		FW	(Greece) Christos Dimopoulos	9	0	2	11
2		FW	(Greece) Giorgos Kostikos	7	2	1	10
3		MF	(Greece) Georgios Skartados	3	2	1	6
3		DF	(Greece) Kostas Malioufas	1	5	0	6
5		DF	(Greece) Giannis Psarras	4	0	0	4
6		MF	(Greece) Vasilis Georgopoulos	2	0	1	3
6		DF	(Greece) Stathis Apostolou	1	2	0	3
8		MF	(Greece) Giorgos Koudas	2	0	0	2
8		MF	(Germany) Holger Trimhold	1	1	0	2
10		MF	(Greece) Kyriakos Alexandridis	1	0	0	1
10		MF	(Greece) Thomas Singas	1	0	0	1
Own goals				1	0	0	1
TOTALS				33	12	5	50

Source: Match reports in competitive matches, RSSSF
