= Double-headed eagles derby =

Football derby between AEK Athens and PAOK

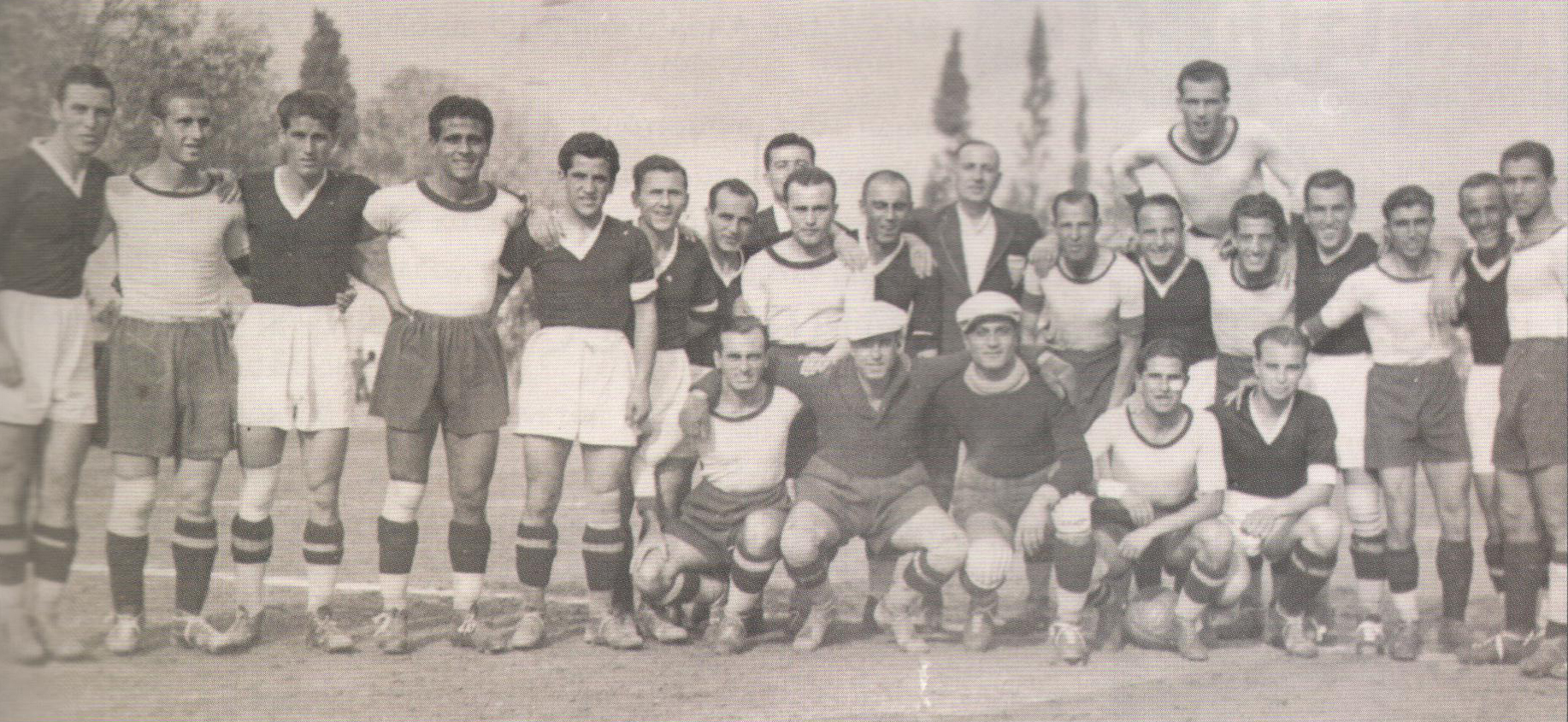
- Players of AEK Athens and PAOK in the 1939 Cup final
- Native name: Ντέρμπι των Δικέφαλων Αετών (Greek)
- Location: Nea Filadelfeia – Thessaloniki, Greece
- Teams: AEK Athens; PAOK
- First meeting: 8 March 1931; Panhellenic Championship; AEK Athens 1–1 PAOK
- Latest meeting: 28 October 2026; Greek Cup; PAOK 3–1 AEK Athens
- Next meeting: 29 November 2026; Super League Greece; AEK Athens – PAOK
- Stadiums: Agia Sophia Stadium (AEK Athens); Toumba Stadium (PAOK)

Statistics
- Total meetings: 204
- Most wins: AEK Athens (86)
- Most player appearances: Giorgos Koudas (PAOK) (41)
- Top scorer: Kostas Nestoridis (AEK Athens) (17 goals)
- All-time series: AEK Athens: 86; Drawn: 53; PAOK: 65
- Largest victory: 3 February 1982; Greek Cup; PAOK 6–1 AEK Athens
- Longest win streak: 5 games AEK Athens (1936–1954); PAOK (2021)
- Longest unbeaten streak: 13 games PAOK (2020–2022)
- Current unbeaten streak: 2 games PAOK (2026–)

The Double-headed eagles derby (Greek: Ντέρμπι των Δικέφαλων Αετών) is a football derby between AEK Athens and PAOK. Both teams have the same roots, being refugees from Constantinople (AEK in Nea Filadelfeia, a suburban town in the Athens agglomeration, and PAOK in Thessaloniki), after the Greco-Turkish War, the Asia Minor Catastrophe and the population exchange. Both teams use the same emblem (Double-headed eagle), to reminisce the Byzantine Empire, but in different colors (black and yellow for AEK, black and white for PAOK). The first match between the two teams took place in Leoforos Alexandras Stadium in Athens during the final phase of the 1930–31 Panhellenic Championship.

== History ==
Since their establishment, the relations between the two clubs were good, as was depicted in the 1939 Cup final, when the players of both clubs entered the pitch hugged. On 2 September 1959, PAOK invited AEK for a friendly match to celebrate the inauguration of the Toumba Stadium. Twenty years later, the president of AEK, Loukas Barlos invited PAOK at Nea Filadelfeia for the testimonial match of their long-serving captain, Mimis Papaioannou.

The rivalry used to remain on-pitch for several years. However, since the 2017 Cup final and the controversial league derby on 11 March 2018, there is an ongoing, intense and overall exaggeration of the rivalry.

== Statistics ==
=== Honours ===
AEK Athens	Competition	PAOK
Domestic
14	Super League Greece	4
16	Greek Cup	8
2	Greek Super Cup	0
1	Greek League Cup (defunct)	0
5	Athens FCA League (defunct)	—
—	Macedonia FCA League (defunct)	8
38	Total	20

=== Matches summary ===
Competition	Matches	Wins		Draws	Goals		Home wins		Home draws		Away wins		Other venue wins	
Competition	Matches	AEK	PAOK	Draws	AEK	PAOK	AEK	PAOK	AEK	PAOK	AEK	PAOK	AEK	PAOK
Super League Greece	170	74	48	48	253	178	55	35	18	30	19	11	0	0
Greek Cup	34	12	17	5	39	44	5	10	2	3	3	5	4	3
Total	204	86	65	53	292	222	60	45	20	33	22	16	4	3

=== Head-to-head ranking in Super League ===
P.	60	61	62	63	64	65	66	67	68	69	70	71	72	73	74	75	76	77	78	79	80	81	82	83	84	85	86	87	88	89	90	91	92	93	94	95	96	97	98	99	00	01	02	03	04	05	06	07	08	09	10	11	12	13	14	15	16	17	18	19	20	21	22	23	24	25	26
1				1					1			1					1		1	1						1				1			1	1	1																								1	1				1	1		1
2	2					2		2			2			2		2	2		2			2							2		2						2	2		2			2				2	2			2			2			2	2	2		2	2	2		2		
3					3		3						3			3		3					3	3		3	3		3		3	3				3			3		3	3		3	3	3			3	3	3	3	3		3					3	3					3	3
4		4	4	4				4							4			4		4	4	4	4	4								4	4					4	4	4		4	4	4	4					4		4					4	4				4		4		4	
5										5	5		5	5	5						5				5			5						5	5	5					5					5							5			5							5				
6			6				6			6																																					6	6																			
7	7																								7			7																																							
8					8	8						8																		8																																					
9									9																																								9																		
10		10																									10																																								
11																																																																			
12																																																																			
13																																																																			
14																																					14																														
15																																																						15													
16																																																																			
17																																																																			
18																																																																			
Super League 2
1																																																								1											
Gamma Ethniki
1																																																							1												

- Total: AEK Athens with 44 higher finishes, PAOK with 23 higher finishes.

== Matches list ==
=== Super League Greece ===
Season	AEK Athens – PAOK					PAOK – AEK Athens		
Season	Date	Venue	Atten.	Score	Date	Venue	Atten.	Score
Panhellenic Championship era (1927–1959)
1930–31	08–03–1931	Leoforos Alexandras Stadium	N/A	1–1	12–07–1931	Iraklis Stadium	N/A	1–2
1931–32	21–02–1932	Leoforos Alexandras Stadium	N/A	2–0	02–05–1932	Syntrivani Stadium	N/A	2–2
1935–36	22–03–1936	Rouf Stadium	N/A	2–0	02–02–1936	Syntrivani Stadium	N/A	4–1
1939–40	09–06–1940	Nikos Goumas Stadium	3,000	1–0	16–06–1940	Syntrivani Stadium	N/A	3–4
1953–54	16–05–1954	Nikos Goumas Stadium	15,000	3–1	20–06–1954	Syntrivani Stadium	10,000	2–2
1957–58	24–04–1958	Nikos Goumas Stadium	8,000	6–2	06–07–1958	Kleanthis Vikelidis Stadium	6,000	1–1
1958–59	01–02–1959	Nikos Goumas Stadium	7,295	0–1	12–04–1959	Syntrivani Stadium	6,999	1–3
Alpha Ethniki era (1959–2006)
1959–60	08–05–1960	Nikos Goumas Stadium	13,000	3–1	13–12–1959	Toumba Stadium	14,230	1–2
1960–61	29–01–1961	Nikos Goumas Stadium	15,000	3–0	25–06–1961	Toumba Stadium	5,000	1–1
1961–62	13–05–1962	Nikos Goumas Stadium	11,000	6–2	10–12–1961	Toumba Stadium	13,276	1–2
1962–63	05–05–1963	Nikos Goumas Stadium	18,470	5–1	09–12–1962	Toumba Stadium	14,442	0–3
1963–64	12–01–1964	Nikos Goumas Stadium	18,762	3–1	15–09–1963	Toumba Stadium	19,912	1–0
1964–65	20–12–1964	Nikos Goumas Stadium	12,897	1–0	16–05–1965	Toumba Stadium	9,377	1–1
1965–66	17–04–1966	Nikos Goumas Stadium	9,814	5–1	02–01–1966	Toumba Stadium	13,225	1–1
1966–67	12–03–1967	Nikos Goumas Stadium	13,443	2–0	20–11–1966	Toumba Stadium	19,640	1–0
1967–68	15–11–1967	Nikos Goumas Stadium	12,295	2–0	25–02–1968	Toumba Stadium	22,156	1–2
1968–69	20–10–1968	Karaiskakis Stadium	26,336	0–1	23–02–1969	Toumba Stadium	18,247	1–1
1969–70	23–11–1969	Nikos Goumas Stadium	26,042	2–0	29–03–1970	Toumba Stadium	21,716	4–0
1970–71	27–09–1970	Nikos Goumas Stadium	29,406	2–0	07–02–1971	Toumba Stadium	25,660	0–0
1971–72	19–09–1971	Nikos Goumas Stadium	28,581	1–0	30–01–1972	Toumba Stadium	35,411	2–0
1972–73	15–04–1973	Nikos Goumas Stadium	29,654	0–2	03–12–1972	Toumba Stadium	39,554	0–0
1973–74	07–04–1974	Nikos Goumas Stadium	17,549	0–0	02–12–1973	Toumba Stadium	26,426	3–0
1974–75	04–05–1975	Nikos Goumas Stadium	16,606	3–1	05–01–1975	Toumba Stadium	39,017	1–1
1975–76	11–01–1976	Kostas Davourlis Stadium	20,105	0–0	02–05–1976	Toumba Stadium	45,010	1–0
1976–77	01–05–1977	Nikos Goumas Stadium	22,161	1–0	19–12–1976	Toumba Stadium	45,252	0–0
1977–78	14–05–1978	Nikos Goumas Stadium	21,741	2–0	08–01–1978	Toumba Stadium	17,552	1–1
1978–79	10–09–1978	Nikos Goumas Stadium	27,854	3–2	11–02–1979	Toumba Stadium	41,909	2–1
1979–80	10–02–1980	Nikos Goumas Stadium	26,949	3–1	14–10–1979	Toumba Stadium	24,082	4–0
1980–81	01–02–1981	Nikos Goumas Stadium	21,973	4–0	14–09–1980	Kaftanzoglio Stadium	36,964	1–2
1981–82	03–01–1982	Nikos Goumas Stadium	23,915	1–1	09–05–1982	Toumba Stadium	15,706	1–1
1982–83	01–05–1983	Korinthos Stadium	6,704	1–3	19–12–1982	Toumba Stadium	10,468	5–0
1983–84	22–01–1984	Nikos Goumas Stadium	14,517	4–0	11–09–1983	Serres Municipal Stadium	11,886	1–0
1984–85	04–11–1984	Nikos Goumas Stadium	23,356	2–2	10–03–1985	Toumba Stadium	40,506	1–1
1985–86	14–09–1985	Athens Olympic Stadium	54,800	1–0	26–01–1986	Toumba Stadium	24,113	2–1
1986–87	06–12–1986	Athens Olympic Stadium	18,349	1–2	05–04–1987	Toumba Stadium	14,167	1–0
1987–88	24–01–1988	Nikos Goumas Stadium	26,217	1–0	06–09–1987	Toumba Stadium	33,243	2–2
1988–89	21–05–1989	Nikos Goumas Stadium	25,934	0–0	15–01–1989	Toumba Stadium	31,969	0–1
1989–90	28–01–1990	Nikos Goumas Stadium	18,255	2–1	17–09–1989	Toumba Stadium	35,346	1–1
1990–91	28–04–1991	Nikos Goumas Stadium	10,454	0–0	23–12–1990	Toumba Stadium	13,782	1–1
1991–92	25–01–1992	Nikos Goumas Stadium	9,562	3–1	07–06–1992	Toumba Stadium	6,184	2–2
1992–93	29–11–1992	Nikos Goumas Stadium	19,220	3–1	10–04–1993	Toumba Stadium	9,267	2–1
1993–94	06–02–1994	Nikos Goumas Stadium	9,479	2–0	25–09–1993	Toumba Stadium	11,248	0–0
1994–95	18–09–1994	Nikos Goumas Stadium	11,517	4–3	19–02–1995	Toumba Stadium	13,509	1–1
1995–96	23–03–1996	Nikos Goumas Stadium	7,700	4–0	06–11–1995	Toumba Stadium	7,946	1–3 (Note: Match suspended at 72nd minute (score: 1–3). Remained as final result.)
1996–97	04–05–1997	Nikos Goumas Stadium	11,250	1–2	05–01–1997	Toumba Stadium	24,056	0–0
1997–98	18–01–1998	Nikos Goumas Stadium	22,129	3–0	31–08–1997	Toumba Stadium	30,347	0–0
1998–99	18–04–1999	Nikos Goumas Stadium	14,139	2–0	07–11–1998	Toumba Stadium	13,535	2–1
1999–2000	05–02–2000	Nikos Goumas Stadium	10,082	2–0	20–09–1999	Toumba Stadium	22,226	4–4
2000–01	19–05–2001	Nikos Goumas Stadium	6,070	3–2	14–01–2001	Toumba Stadium	7,038	2–1
2001–02	08–05–2002	Nikos Goumas Stadium	11,079	6–2	27–01–2002	Toumba Stadium	21,542	3–2
2002–03	01–12–2002	Nikos Goumas Stadium	5,188	3–4	22–03–2003	Toumba Stadium	11,340	0–1
2003–04	01–11–2003	Giannis Pathiakakis Stadium	2,134	3–1	21–03–2004	Toumba Stadium	24,829	3–2
2004–05	10–04–2005	Athens Olympic Stadium	35,994	2–0	05–12–2004	Toumba Stadium	9,568	1–1
2005–06	04–12–2005	Athens Olympic Stadium	24,677	2–1	09–04–2006	Toumba Stadium	10,367	2–1
Super League era (2006–present)
2006–07	19–08–2006	Athens Olympic Stadium	23,109	0–0	06–01–2007	Toumba Stadium	15,686	2–0
2007–08	30–12–2007	Athens Olympic Stadium	24,257	2–0	13–04–2008	Toumba Stadium	11,569	0–4
2008–09	11–01–2009	Athens Olympic Stadium	19,194	1–0	14–09–2008	Toumba Stadium	25,203	1–1
2009–10	28–11–2009	Athens Olympic Stadium	15,942	1–0	21–03–2010	Toumba Stadium	18,589	0–1
2010–11	06–03–2011	Athens Olympic Stadium	5,518	4–0	13–11–2010	Toumba Stadium	18,453	2–1
2011–12	29–01–2012	Athens Olympic Stadium	6,110	0–2	25–09–2011	Toumba Stadium	19,235	3–0
2012–13	16–02–2013	Athens Olympic Stadium	15,105	0–0	20–10–2012	Toumba Stadium	15,239	1–0
2015–16	24–02–2016	Athens Olympic Stadium	13,792	1–0	23–09–2015	Toumba Stadium	21,199	2–1
2016–17	12–03–2017	Athens Olympic Stadium	11,879	3–0	30–10–2016	Toumba Stadium	18,741	1–0
2017–18	05–11–2017	Athens Olympic Stadium	14,056	1–0	11–03–2018	Toumba Stadium	21,431	0–3 (Note: Match suspended at 90th minute (score: 1–0). Awarded 0–3 to AEK.)
2018–19	03–02–2019	Athens Olympic Stadium	24,291	1–1	23–09–2018	Toumba Stadium	23,763	2–0
2019–20	29–09–2019	Athens Olympic Stadium	32,576	2–2	12–01–2020	Toumba Stadium	21,332	1–0
2020–21	18–10–2020	Athens Olympic Stadium	Cl. doors	1–1	24–01–2021	Toumba Stadium	Cl. doors	2–2
2021–22	02–03–2022	Athens Olympic Stadium	4,541	1–1	26–09–2021	Toumba Stadium	10,326	2–0
2022–23	30–10–2022	Agia Sophia Stadium	31,100	2–0	19–02–2023	Toumba Stadium	18,410	2–0
2023–24	30–10–2023	Agia Sophia Stadium	31,100	2–0	11–02–2024	Toumba Stadium	Cl. doors	1–1
2024–25	20–10–2024	Agia Sophia Stadium	30,950	1–1	02–02–2025	Toumba Stadium	22,150	1–2
2025–26	19–10–2025	Agia Sophia Stadium	29,210	0–2	15–02–2026	Toumba Stadium	25,022	0–0

- There were no games in 2013–14 and 2014–15 seasons due to the relegation of AEK to lower divisions.

==== Play-off match ====
Season	AEK Athens – PAOK				PAOK – AEK Athens			
Season	Date	Venue	Atten.	Score	Date	Venue	Atten.	Score
2008–09	20–05–2009	Athens Olympic Stadium	14,831	3–1	17–05–2009	Toumba Stadium	28,703	0–1
2009–10	28–04–2010	Athens Olympic Stadium	11,807	0–0	16–05–2010	Toumba Stadium	25,303	1–0
2010–11	15–05–2011	Athens Olympic Stadium	Cl. doors	3–0	18–05–2011	Toumba Stadium	19,075	2–1
2011–12	16–05–2012	Athens Olympic Stadium	8,293	2–0	02–05–2012	Toumba Stadium	9,771	1–0
2015–16	25–05–2016	Athens Olympic Stadium	10,880	0–0	11–05–2016	Toumba Stadium	Cl. doors	2–1
2016–17	28–05–2017	Athens Olympic Stadium	3,552	1–0	14–05–2017	Toumba Stadium	15,413	0–1
2019–20	15–07–2020	Athens Olympic Stadium	Cl. doors	0–0	01–07–2020	Toumba Stadium	Cl. doors	0–2
2020–21	05–05–2021	Athens Olympic Stadium	Cl. doors	1–2	21–03–2021	Toumba Stadium	Cl. doors	3–1
2021–22	20–03–2022	Athens Olympic Stadium	8,075	0–1	01–05–2022	Toumba Stadium	6,922	1–1
2022–23	26–04–2023	Agia Sophia Stadium	30,570	4–0	02–04–2023	Toumba Stadium	21,771	0–1
2023–24	07–04–2024	Agia Sophia Stadium	31,080	2–2	28–04–2024	Toumba Stadium	17,362	3–2
2024–25	30–03–2025	Agia Sophia Stadium	25,433	2–3	11–05–2025	Toumba Stadium	22,711	1–0
2025–26	19–04–2026	Agia Sophia Stadium	31,100	3–0	13–05–2026	Toumba Stadium	14,390	1-1

=== Greek Cup ===
Season	Round	AEK Athens – PAOK				PAOK – AEK Athens				Winner
Season	Round	Date	Venue	Atten.	Score	Date	Venue	Atten.	Score	Winner
1931–32	Semi-finals	18–10–1931	Leoforos Alexandras Stadium	N/A	2–1					AEK
1938–39	Final	28–05–1939	Leoforos Alexandras Stadium	N/A	2–1					AEK
1963–64	Round of 16					24–05–1964	Toumba Stadium	9,061	0–3 (a.e.t.)	AEK
1964–65	Round of 16	18–04–1965	Nikos Goumas Stadium	11,066	4–0					AEK
1970–71	Semi-finals					26–05–1971	Toumba Stadium	28,815	3–2	PAOK
1973–74	Round of 16					24–02–1974	Toumba Stadium	23,597	3–1	PAOK
1976–77	Round of 16					09–02–1977	Toumba Stadium	44,045	2–1	PAOK
1977–78	Final	04–06–1978	Karaiskakis Stadium	23,483	2–0					AEK
1979–80	Round of 16					20–02–1980	Toumba Stadium	28,151	1–0	PAOK
1980–81	Semi-finals	10–06–1981	Municipal Stadium of Chalkida	12,736	0–2	03–06–1981	Toumba Stadium	26,674	1–0	PAOK
1981–82	Round of 16	24–02–1982	Nikos Goumas Stadium	7,117	2–2	03–02–1982	Toumba Stadium	19,550	6–1	PAOK
1982–83	Final	29–06–1983	Athens Olympic Stadium	72,240	2–0					AEK
1991–92	Semi-finals	15–04–1992	Nikos Goumas Stadium	15,153	2–0	29–04–1992	Toumba Stadium	21,388	3–0 (a.e.t.)	PAOK
2001–02	Quarter-finals	30–01–2002	Nikos Goumas Stadium	6,310	2–1	06–02–2002	Toumba Stadium	15,109	0–4	AEK
2002–03	Semi-finals	23–04–2003	Nikos Goumas Stadium	10,082	0–1	07–05–2003	Toumba Stadium	8,363	1–1	PAOK
2010–11	Semi-finals	02–03–2011	Athens Olympic Stadium	16,928	0–0	16–03–2011	Toumba Stadium	23,105	0–1	AEK
2011–12	Round of 16					18–01–2012	Toumba Stadium	15,095	2–0	PAOK
2016–17	Final					06–05–2017	Panthessaliko Stadium	19,236	2–1	PAOK
2017–18	Final	12–05–2018	Athens Olympic Stadium	35,545	0–2					PAOK
2018–19	Final	11–05–2019	Athens Olympic Stadium	Cl. doors	0–1					PAOK
2020–21	Semi-finals	07–04–2021	Athens Olympic Stadium	Cl. doors	0–1	29–04–2021	Toumba Stadium	Cl. doors	2–1	PAOK
2021–22	Quarter-finals	09–02–2022	Athens Olympic Stadium	Cl. doors	1–2	19–01–2022	Toumba Stadium	Cl. doors	0–0	PAOK
2022–23	Final	24–05–2023	Panthessaliko Stadium	Cl. doors	2–0					AEK
2024–25	Quarter-finals	18–12–2024	Agia Sophia Stadium	27,612	1–0	09–01–2025	Toumba Stadium	22,837	1–1 (a.e.t.)	AEK
2026–27	League phase					28–10–2026	Toumba Stadium	N/A	3–1	Both

- Series won: AEK 10, PAOK 14.

== Top scorers ==
Rank	Player	Club	League	Greek Cup	Super Cup	League Cup	Total
1	(Greece) Kostas Nestoridis	AEK Athens	14	3	0	0	17
2	(Greece) Mimis Papaioannou	AEK Athens	12	3	0	0	15
3	(Greece) Thomas Mavros	AEK Athens	8	4	0	0	12
4	(Greece) Demis Nikolaidis	AEK Athens	10	1	0	0	11
5	(Brazil) Neto Guerino	PAOK	6	3	0	0	9
5	(Greece) Christos Dimopoulos	PAOK	4	5	0	0	9
7	(Greece) Christos Kostis	AEK Athens	7	0	0	0	7
7	(Greece) Giorgos Koudas	PAOK	6	1	0	0	7
7	(Greece) Vasilios Tsiartas	AEK Athens	5	2	0	0	7
10	(Greece) Andreas Stamatiadis	AEK Athens	6	0	0	0	6
10	(Greece) Vasilios Vasilakos	Both clubs	6	0	0	0	6
10	(Greece) Vasilis Dimitriadis	AEK Athens	6	0	0	0	6
10	(Greece) Ioannis Giakoumis	PAOK	6	0	0	0	6
10	(Argentina) Ismael Blanco	AEK Athens	6	0	0	0	6
10	(Greece) Stavros Sarafis	PAOK	5	1	0	0	6
10	(Cyprus) Ioannis Okkas	Both clubs	5	1	0	0	6
17	(Greece) Nikos Liberopoulos	AEK Athens	5	0	0	0	5
17	(Socialist Federal Republic of Yugoslavia) Dušan Bajević	AEK Athens	4	1	0	0	5
17	(Greece) Stefanos Athanasiadis	PAOK	4	1	0	0	5
17	(Portugal) Vieirinha	PAOK	4	1	0	0	5
17	(Greece) Dimitris Paridis	PAOK	3	2	0	0	5
17	(Serbia) Andrija Živković	PAOK	3	2	0	0	5

== European records ==
=== AEK Athens ===
Competition	App	Pld	W	D	L	Goals
European Cup / UEFA Champions League	17	78	19	23	36	84–124
UEFA Cup / Europa League	27	142	47	33	62	187–212
UEFA Conference League	3	22	13	4	5	42–25
UEFA Cup Winners' Cup	6	22	10	3	9	33–27
Inter-Cities Fairs Cup	1	2	0	0	2	0–4
Total	54	266	89	63	114	346–392

=== PAOK ===
Competition	App	Pld	W	D	L	Goals
European Cup / UEFA Champions League	10	32	8	10	14	45–57
UEFA Cup / Europa League	30	174	66	49	59	247–203
UEFA Conference League	3	34	18	7	9	55–34
UEFA Cup Winners' Cup	6	18	8	5	5	24–23
Inter-Cities Fairs Cup	3	6	2	0	4	5–17
Total	52	264	102	71	91	376–334

Last updated: 16 April 2026

== Personnel at both clubs ==
=== Players ===
Players from PAOK to AEK Athens

- 1929: (Greece) Christoforos Pantermalis
- 1931: (Greece) Iordanis Papaiordanidis
- 1933: (Greece) Georgios Papadopoulos
- 1934: (Greece) Kyriakos Athanasiadis
- 1946: (Greece) Youlielmos Arvanitis
- 1951: (Greece) Giorgos Mouratidis
- 1956: (Greece) Sofoklis Arvanitis (via Panathinaikos)
- 1986: (Greece) Vasilios Georgopoulos (via Panionios)
- 1986: (Greece) Dimitris Pittas
- 1987: (Greece) Vasilios Vasilakos
- 1998: (Greece) Paraschos Zouboulis
- 2000: (Greece) Theodoros Zagorakis (via Leicester City)
- 2002: (Greece) Dimitris Nalitzis (via Udinese)
- 2003: (Cyprus) Ioannis Okkas
- 2003: (Ghana) Kofi Amponsah
- 2006: (Nigeria) Ifeanyi Udeze (Note: Returned to PAOK in 2007 after joining AEK for half a season.)
- 2007: (Greece) Pantelis Kafes (via Olympiacos)
- 2016: (Greece) Lazaros Christodoulopoulos (via Panathinaikos, Bologna and Hellas Verona)
- 2020: (Ukraine) Yevhen Shakhov (via Lecce)
- 2021: (Greece) Georgios Tzavellas (via Alanyaspor)

Players from AEK Athens to PAOK

- 1964: (Greece) Giannis Doukas
- 1965: (Greece) Emilios Theofanidis
- 1984: (Greece) Lakis Stergioudas
- 1998: (Greece) Triantafyllos Macheridis
- 1998: (Greece) Pantelis Konstantinidis (via Apollon Athens)
- 2002: (Greece) Dimitris Markos (via Aris)
- 2000: (Greece) Vasilios Borbokis (via Sheffield United and Derby County) (Note: Returned to AEK in 2002 after joining PAOK for 2 and a half seasons.)
- 2003: (Greece) Ilias Atmatsidis
- 2003: (Greece) Christos Maladenis
- 2007: (Greece) Vasilios Lakis
- 2008: (Serbia) Vladan Ivić (via Aris)
- 2008: (Greece) Ilias Anastasakos (via Apollon Athens, Asteras Tripolis and Thrasyvoulos)
- 2009: (Italy) Bruno Cirillo (via Levante and Reggina) (Note: Returned to AEK in 2013 after joining PAOK for 3 seasons.)
- 2010: (Portugal) Edinho (via Málaga)
- 2012: (Greece) Kostas Katsouranis (via Benfica and Panathinaikos)
- 2021: (Portugal) Nélson Oliveira
- 2025: (Greece) Giorgos Giakoumakis (via VVV-Venlo, Celtic, Atlanta United and Cruz Azul)

=== Managers ===
- (Hungary) Jenő Csaknády
  - AEK Athens: 1962–1963, 1967–1968
  - PAOK: 1969–1970
- (Socialist Federal Republic of Yugoslavia) Branko Stanković
  - AEK Athens: 1968–1973
  - PAOK: 1976–1977
- (Northern Ireland) Billy Bingham
  - AEK Athens: 1973
  - PAOK: 1977
- (Greece) Nikos Alefantos
  - AEK Athens: 1986–1987
  - PAOK: 1989
- (Bosnia and Herzegovina) Dušan Bajević
  - AEK Athens: 1988–1996, 2002–2004, 2008–2010
  - PAOK: 2000–2002
- (Ukraine) Oleg Blokhin
  - PAOK: 1993–1994, 1998
  - AEK Athens: 1998–1999
- (Romania) Ilie Dumitrescu
  - AEK Athens: 2004
  - PAOK: 2006
- (Portugal) Fernando Santos
  - AEK Athens: 2001–2002, 2004–2006
  - PAOK: 2007–2010
- (Greece) Georgios Donis
  - AEK Athens: 2008
  - PAOK: 2012–2013
