= Nikos Alavantas =

Greek footballer

Personal information
- Full name: Nikolaos Alavantas
- Date of birth: 13 April 1959 (age 67)
- Place of birth: Krios, Evros, Greece
- Height: 1.73 m (5 ft 8 in)
- Position: Defender

Youth career
- 1975–1977: PAOK

Senior career*
| Years | Team | Apps | (Gls) |
| 1977–1989 | PAOK | 240 | (2) |
| 1989–1992 | Xanthi | 61 | (0) |
| Total | | 301 | (2) |

International career
| 1983–1987 | Greece | 31 | (0) |
- * Club domestic league appearances and goals

Nikos Alavantas (Greek: Nίκος Aλαβάντας; born 13 April 1959) is a Greek former international footballer who played mainly as a wing-back and sweeper (libero) and occasionally as a defensive midfielder.

== Career ==
=== Club career ===
Alavantas joined PAOK youth ranks in 1975 when his father who was a PAOK supporter took him one day to the club's youth trials. Former PAOK footballer Lefteris Papadakis was impressed by his speed and approved his acquisition. In January 1978, he signed his first contract with PAOK. He started his career as a winger and he was later used by Egon Piechaczek in the midfield. It was Heinz Höher who established him as a defender. Alavantas made 300 appearances and scored 3 goals in all competitions with the White-blacks of the North. He participated in 3 Greek Cup finals and won the 1985 league title. In December 1989, he moved to Xanthi and ended his career in 1992.

=== International career ===
Alavantas had 31 caps for the Greece national team between 1983 and 1987.

== Career statistics ==
=== Club career ===
Appearances and goals by club, season and competition
| Club | Season | Greek League | | Greek Cup | | Continental | | Total | |
| Club | Season | Apps | Goals | Apps | Goals | Apps | Goals | Apps | Goals |
|---|---|---|---|---|---|---|---|---|---|
| PAOK | 1977–78 | 6 | 0 | 3 | 0 | 0 | 0 | 9 | 0 |
| PAOK | 1978–79 | 13 | 0 | 0 | 0 | 2 | 0 | 15 | 0 |
| PAOK | 1979–80 | 24 | 1 | 4 | 0 | – | | 28 | 1 |
| PAOK | 1980–81 | 12 | 0 | 2 | 0 | – | | 14 | 0 |
| PAOK | 1981–82 | 32 | 0 | 6 | 0 | 2 | 0 | 40 | 0 |
| PAOK | 1982–83 | 30 | 1 | 7 | 0 | 4 | 0 | 41 | 1 |
| PAOK | 1983–84 | 29 | 0 | 6 | 0 | 4 | 0 | 39 | 0 |
| PAOK | 1984–85 | 27 | 1 | 6 | 1 | – | | 33 | 2 |
| PAOK | 1985–86 | 28 | 0 | 2 | 0 | 2 | 0 | 32 | 0 |
| PAOK | 1986–87 | 20 | 0 | 3 | 0 | – | | 23 | 0 |
| PAOK | 1987–88 | 0 | 0 | 0 | 0 | – | | 0 | 0 |
| PAOK | 1988–89 | 15 | 0 | 4 | 0 | 0 | 0 | 19 | 0 |
| PAOK | 1989–90 (i) | 4 | 0 | 3 | 0 | – | | 7 | 0 |
| PAOK | Total | 240 | 2 | 46 | 1 | 14 | 0 | 300 | 3 |
| Xanthi | 1989–90 (ii) | 13 | 0 | – | | – | | 13 | 0 |
| Xanthi | 1990–91 | 27 | 0 | | | – | | | |
| Xanthi | 1991–92 | 21 | 0 | | | – | | | |
| Xanthi | Total | 61 | 0 | | | – | | | |
| Career total | | 301 | 2 | | | 14 | 0 | | |

Source: RSSSF

=== International career ===
| National team | Year | Caps |
|---|---|---|
Greece
| Greece | 1983 | 5 |
| Greece | 1984 | 9 |
| Greece | 1985 | 7 |
| Greece | 1986 | 7 |
| Greece | 1987 | 3 |
| Total | | 31 |

== Honours ==
PAOK

- Alpha Ethniki: 1984–85
