= Mladen Furtula =

Bosnian Serb footballer

Personal information
- Full name: Mladen Furtula
- Date of birth: September 17, 1950 (age 76)
- Place of birth: Sarajevo, FPR Yugoslavia
- Height: 1.85 m (6 ft 1 in)
- Position: Goalkeeper

Youth career
- Sutjeska Foča

Senior career*
| Years | Team | Apps | (Gls) |
| 1970–1973 | Partizan | 23 | (0) |
| 1973–1974 | Dinamo Pančevo | 19 | (0) |
| 1974–1975 | Panserraikos | 34 | (0) |
| 1975–1984 | PAOK | 216 | (0) |
| Total | | 292 | (0) |
- * Club domestic league appearances and goals

Mladen Furtula (Serbian Cyrillic: Младен Фуртула; born September 17, 1950) is a Bosnian Serb former footballer who played as a goalkeeper.

== Club career ==
Furtula started playing football at Sutjeska Foča. In 1969, he moved to Partizan Belgrade and he played for Dinamo Pančevo in the 1973–74 season. In the summer of 1974, he agreed to join Las Palmas, however his parents were opposed to their son's move to Spain, which at the time was under the dictatorship of Francisco Franco. He was eventually transerred to Greek club Panserraikos and in the 1974–75 season, he participated in all Championship matches and stood out with his performance, attracting the interest of major teams, such as Panathinaikos, AEK Athens and PAOK. He chose to continue his career at the Double-headed eagle of the North and under the guidance of Gyula Lóránt in his first season with the team, he won the Greek Championship which was the first in the club's history. He played for PAOK until the summer of 1984, when he retired from active football at the age of 34. He made a total of 277 appearances in all competitions (216 in the league, 42 in the Cup and 19 in European competitions) with PAOK and his 137 "clean sheets" is an all-time club record.

== Career statistics ==
Furtula's apps during his career in Greece
| Club | Season | League | Cup | Europe | Total |
|---|---|---|---|---|---|
| Panserraikos | 1974–75 | 34 | 1 | 0 | 35 |
| PAOK | 1975–76 | 30 | 3 | 2 | 35 |
| PAOK | 1976–77 | 15 | 3 | 4 | 22 |
| PAOK | 1977–78 | 33 | 6 | 4 | 43 |
| PAOK | 1978–79 | 21 | 1 | 1 | 23 |
| PAOK | 1979–80 | 18 | 4 | 0 | 22 |
| PAOK | 1980–81 | 31 | 8 | 0 | 39 |
| PAOK | 1981–82 | 15 | 5 | 0 | 20 |
| PAOK | 1982–83 | 29 | 6 | 4 | 39 |
| PAOK | 1983–84 | 24 | 6 | 4 | 34 |
| PAOK | Τotal | 216 | 42 | 19 | 277 |
| Career total | | 250 | 43 | 19 | 312 |

Source: RSSSF

== Other football-related activities ==
After the end of his football career, Furtula took over as PAOK goalkeeper coach during the 1984–85 season, when the team won the second league title in the club's history. He suggested that year to PAOK president Giorgos Pantelakis the acquisition of Yugoslavs Rade Paprica and Ivan Jurišić. Pantelakis watched them himself and was convinced for their value. The following season, he did not come to terms with president Haris Savvidis and was dismissed from PAOK.

Furtula worked as a football agent for a while and returned to PAOK under the presidency of Giorgos Batatoudis, taking over as general manager of the football department. He was the one who proposed the hiring of Dušan Bajević as the team's manager in January 2000 and celebrated with the Double-headed Eagle of the North the conquest of the 2001 Greek Cup.

== Honours ==
PAOK

- Alpha Ethniki: 1975–76

== Bibliography ==
- Bliatkas, Kostas (2005). Γιώργος Κούδας, της ζωής μου το παιχνίδι [Giorgos Koudas, the game of my life] (in Greek). Greece: Ianos Publications. ISBN 978-960-7827-35-7.
- Pappous, Michalis (2019). Ο ΠΑΟΚ του '70 [The PAOK of the '70s] (in Greek). Greece: University Studio Press. ISBN 978-960-12-2421-3.
