= Christos Dimopoulos =

Greek footballer

Personal information
- Date of birth: 6 September 1959 (age 67)
- Place of birth: Xylokera, Elis, Greece
- Height: 1.80 m (5 ft 11 in)
- Position: Forward

Youth career
- 1973–1977: Hephaestus Vounargou
- 1977–1978: Aias Gastouni

Senior career*
Years	Team	Apps	(Gls)
1978–1980	Panetolikos	63	(18)
1980–1985	PAOK	112	(47)
1985–1990	Panathinaikos	112	(40)
1990–1993	Athinaikos	60	(21)
1993–1994	Kalamata	18	(8)
Total		365	(134)

International career
1982–1985	Greece	10	(0)
- * Club domestic league appearances and goals

Christos Dimopoulos (Greek: Χρήστος Δημόπουλος, born 6 September 1959) is a former Greek international footballer who played as a forward for PAOK and Panathinaikos. His nickname was "Fonias" (Greek: Φονιάς, meaning "The Killer") of Greek football.

== Career ==
=== Early career ===
Dimopoulos was born in Xylokera, Elis. He took his first steps in football at Hephaestus Vounargou and Aias Gastouni. In 1978, he was acquired by Panetolikos who participated in the second-tier Beta Ethniki. His manager during his second season at the club was Giannis Giakoumis, a former PAOK footballer who, impressed by his skills, had suggested his signing to the then PAOK president, Giorgos Pantelakis.

=== PAOK ===
In the summer of 1980, Dimopoulos transferred to PAOK to replace departing forward Kostas Orfanos, who had just moved to Olympiacos. He played for five seasons, netting 66 goals in all competitions (47 in the league, 14 in the Cup and 5 in European competitions). During his time with PAOK, he linked up effectively with Giorgos Kostikos in attack, which culminated in winning the 1985 league title. In 1982, PAOK fans gave Dimopoulos the nickname "Fonias" (Greek: Φονιάς, meaning "The Killer"), due to his incredible goalscoring record against AEK Athens during that calendar year. In just four matches against AEK—consisting of one Alpha Ethniki match, two Greek Cup ties, and one friendly match—Dimopoulos scored a staggering 11 goals in total. At the end of the 1984–85 campaign, Dimopoulos was PAOK's top goalscorer with 12 league goals, helping the club win the championship. On 22 June, 10-man (Vasilakos was sent-off early in the first half) PAOK lost 4–1 to Larissa in the Greek Cup final held at the Olympic Stadium of Athens and wasted the opportunity to win a first domestic Double. Dimopoulos did not participate as he left the team at Athens airport when they arrived from Thessaloniki for the game. He went to the headquarters of Motor Oil (company of Panathinaikos president Vardinogiannis) in order to seal his transfer to Panathinaikos as his five-year contract with PAOK was expiring.

=== Panathinaikos ===
Dimopoulos therefore joined Panathinaikos in 1985 and played for five seasons until 1990. During his five-year spell with the club, he made 112 league appearances and scored 40 goals, establishing himself as a reliable and clutch forward, adding two league titles (1985–86, 1989–90), three Greek Cups (1985–86, 1987–88, 1988–89) and one Super Cup (1988) to his honours. During his time with the club, Dimopoulos formed a highly prolific attacking partnership with Dimitris Saravakos. Their chemistry was perfectly showcased in the 1986 Greek Cup final, where Panathinaikos defeated rivals Olympiacos 4–0, with Saravakos scoring twice and Dimopoulos adding another. Besides domestic titles, the pair played a major role in Panathinaikos' 1987–88 UEFA Cup campaign. Their most pivotal continental moment came on 4 November 1987, when both Dimopoulos and Saravakos scored away against Juventus at the Stadio Comunale in Turin, securing an aggregate qualification for the Greek club despite a 3–2 defeat on the night. Dimopoulos was also a key figure in the 1988 Greek Cup final against Olympiacos, scoring the equalizer in the 102nd minute of extra time to make it 2–2, and later converting his penalty kick in the shoot-out to help Panathinaikos win the trophy. The following year, he scored again from the penalty spot in the 1989 Greek Cup final (a 3–1 victory over Panionios), meaning he scored in all three Greek Cup finals he won during his time with Panathinaikos.

=== Later career ===
Between 1990 and 1993, Dimopoulos played for Athinaikos (60 league appearances, 21 goals), helping them finish as Greek Cup runners-up in 1991 and reach the following season's European Cup Winners' Cup, where they were eliminated by Manchester United after a 2–0 extra-time loss in the second leg at Old Trafford.

He later joined Kalamata for one season in the Beta Ethniki, and finished his career playing for Pyrgos in the Fourth Division during the 1994–95 season.

==== The 1991 Karaiskakis Stadium pitch invasion ====
On 10 February 1991, during an Alpha Ethniki match between Olympiacos and Athinaikos at Karaiskakis Stadium, Dimopoulos became the central figure in one of Greek football's most infamous pitch invasions. Olympiacos had taken a comfortable 2–0 lead, but Athinaikos staged a dramatic comeback late in the second half. Dimopoulos scored in the 72nd minute to make it 2–1, and Tzalakostas equalized to 2–2 in the 76th minute. In the 88th minute, with the tension heavily escalated, a foul called against Olympiacos triggered a mass pitch invasion by furious home fans. A group of supporters entered the pitch and began chasing Dimopoulos, who was targeted due to his past as a prominent player for Olympiacos' fierce rivals, Panathinaikos and PAOK. Dimopoulos had to sprint across the field and successfully escaped into the dressing rooms unharmed. The match was permanently abandoned, and the incident gained further notoriety due to a controversial statement by Olympiacos president Argyris Saliarelis, who claimed the invading fans were not hooligans but rather "scientists and educated citizens".

==== World Record (Three siblings scoring on the same day) ====
On 2 February 1992, during the 18th matchday of the Alpha Ethniki, the Dimopoulos brothers achieved a unique football milestone. All three brothers—Christos, Thanasis and Spyros—who played as forwards for three different top-flight clubs, managed to score on the exact same day, setting a remarkable world record. The goals were scored almost simultaneously during the Sunday afternoon matches:

- Christos Dimopoulos netted both goals in Athinaikos' 2–0 home victory over Panserraikos.
- Thanasis Dimopoulos scored for Iraklis in a 2–2 away draw against Panionios.
- Spyros Dimopoulos scored for Ethnikos Piraeus in a 2–1 win against Apollon Athens.

This coincidence remains a statistical occurrence in the history of Greek and international football.

=== International career ===
Dimopoulos had 10 caps for the Greece national team, between 1982 and 1985.

== Career statistics ==
=== Club career ===
Appearances and goals by club, season and competition
Club	Season	League			Cup		Continental		Total	
Club	Season	Division	Apps	Goals	Apps	Goals	Apps	Goals	Apps	Goals
Panetolikos	1978–79	Beta Ethniki					–			
Panetolikos	1979–80	Beta Ethniki					–			
Panetolikos	Total		63	18			–			
PAOK	1980–81	Alpha Ethniki	4	2	2	0	–		6	2
PAOK	1981–82	Alpha Ethniki	32	13	6	7	1	0	39	20
PAOK	1982–83	Alpha Ethniki	30	11	5	2	4	3	39	16
PAOK	1983–84	Alpha Ethniki	18	9	1	0	4	2	23	11
PAOK	1984–85	Alpha Ethniki	28	12	8	5	–		36	17
PAOK	Total		112	47	22	14	9	5	143	66
Panathinaikos	1985–86	Alpha Ethniki	19	8		4	0	0		12
Panathinaikos	1986–87	Alpha Ethniki	23	8		5	2	1		14
Panathinaikos	1987–88	Alpha Ethniki	26	11		4	8	1		16
Panathinaikos	1988–89	Alpha Ethniki	23	8		3	2	1		12
Panathinaikos	1989–90	Alpha Ethniki	21	5		2	4	1		8
Panathinaikos	Total		112	40		18	16	4		62
Athinaikos	1990–91	Alpha Ethniki	20	4			–			
Athinaikos	1991–92	Alpha Ethniki	20	11			1	0		
Athinaikos	1992–93	Alpha Ethniki	20	6			–			
Athinaikos	Total		60	21			1	0		
Kalamata	1993–94	Beta Ethniki	18	8			–			
Career total (Alpha Ethniki)			284	108			26	9		

Source: RSSSF

=== International career ===
National team	Year	Caps
Greece
Greece	1982	5
Greece	1983	4
Greece	1985	1
Total		10

== Honours ==
PAOK

- Alpha Ethniki: 1984–85

Panathinaikos

- Alpha Ethniki: 1985–86, 1989–90
- Greek Cup: 1985–86, 1987–88, 1988–89
- Greek Super Cup: 1988
