= Holger Trimhold =

German footballer (born 1953)

Personal information
- Full name: Holger Trimhold
- Date of birth: 13 June 1953 (age 73)
- Place of birth: Wolfhagen, West Germany
- Position: Midfielder

Senior career*
Years	Team	Apps	(Gls)
1971–1975	Schwarz-Weiss Essen	124	(45)
1975–1979	VfL Bochum	105	(11)
1979–1982	Eintracht Braunschweig	48	(3)
1982–1984	PAOK	42	(6)
- * Club domestic league appearances and goals

Holger Trimhold (born 13 June 1953) is a retired German football midfielder. He is the younger brother of Horst Trimhold.
