= Diagoras Stadium =

Stadium in Rhodes, Greece

Coordinates: 36°26′18″N 28°13′42″E

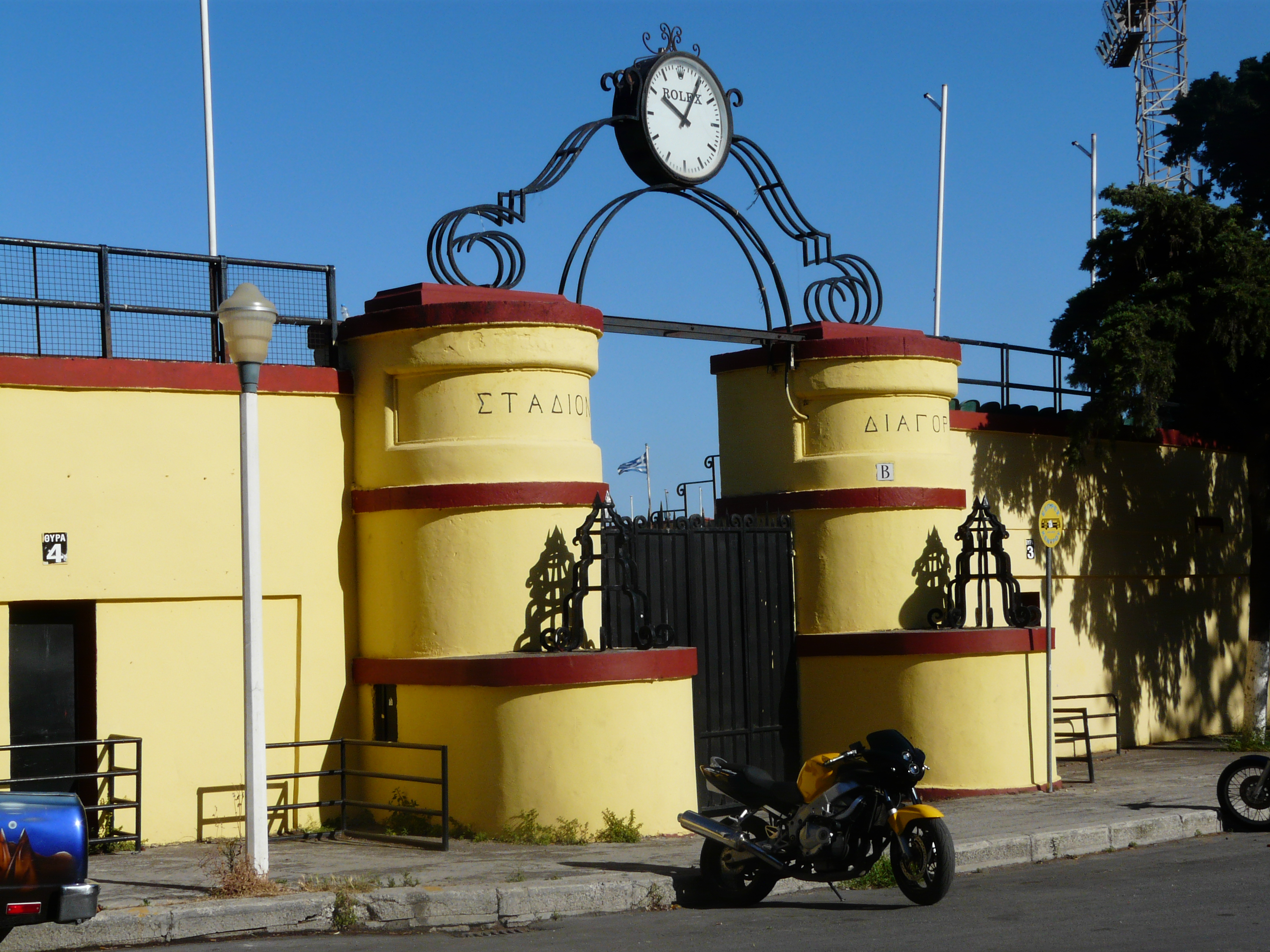
- Interactive map of Diagoras Stadium
- Full name: Municipal Stadium of Rhodes "Diagoras"
- Former names: Arena del Sole
- Location: Rhodes, Greece
- Owner: Municipality of Rhodes
- Capacity: 8,500 (original); 3,693 (current)

Construction
- Built: 1932
- Opened: 1932
- Renovated: 1981, 2019

Tenants
- Diagoras F.C. Rodos F.C.

The Municipal Stadium of Rhodes "Diagoras" (former national), with its original Italian name Arena Del Sole, is a football and cycling stadium in the city of Rhodes and is the seat of the General Assembly of Diagoras Rhodes and AS. Rhodes. It is well-lit, has a bike path and a covered roof at gates 1 and 2. It also has an auxiliary training center with natural turf and open basketball and volleyball courts.

== History ==
The stadium was built in 1932 by the Italian authorities with architect Armando Bernabiti, based on an ancient Hellenic U-shaped stadium, with stands on three sides, and was then called Arena Del Sole (Sun Arena), there are reports that in 1936 with the change of commander of the then Italian Dodecanese, from Mario Lago to Cesare Maria De Vecchi, the stadium was renamed "Stadio Mussolini", but there are no valid sources. Towards the end of the Second World War, it was named "Diagoras" after the ancient boxer Diagoras of Rhodes by members of the General Assembly of the club and other Rhodian patriots, as it was used as the headquarters of the Diagoras Gymnastics Association.

In the early 1980s, the outer wall of the stadium was about 250 cm., then doubled, and thus lost its original Italian form, but not in the auxiliary training center. The record capacity of the stadium is 8,500 people. The capacity of the stadium is 3,693 seats.

Until the beginning of the new millennium, there were no seats, except for the covered tribune, until they were placed in the rest of the stadium. In 2016, by order of the Third National Division, the seats were removed. In 2019 the wall from gate 4 to 5 was tilted and torn down to be repaired. In 2019, the Municipality of Rhodes, by order of the Football League, restored the seats.

In 2020 the wall at gates 4-5 was repaired in its early Italian form and with the exact same alabaster stones used in its construction in 1932.

In 2021, a fund was approved for the renovation and maintenance of the stadium and the facilities, but they will not change its original appearance due to the fact that it is part of the Service of Modern Monuments.

== See also ==
- Rhodes
