= 1983–84 Alpha Ethniki =

48th season of top-tier football league in Greece

Alpha Ethniki
- Season: 1983–84
- Champions: Panathinaikos; 13th Greek title
- Relegated: PAS Giannina; Panserraikos
- European Cup: Panathinaikos
- UEFA Cup: Olympiacos
- Cup Winners' Cup: AEL
- Matches: 240
- Goals: 529 (2.2 per match)
- Top goalscorer: Nikos Anastopoulos (18 goals)

The 1983–84 Alpha Ethniki was the 48th season of the highest football league of Greece. The season began on 4 September 1983 and ended on 6 May 1984. Panathinaikos won their 13th Greek title and their first one in seven years.

The point system was: Win: 2 points - Draw: 1 point.

== Teams ==
Promoted from 1982–83 Beta Ethniki	Relegated from 1982–83 Alpha Ethniki
Egaleo; Apollon Kalamarias	Makedonikos; Panachaiki; Rodos; Kastoria

Location of teams in 1983–84 Alpha Ethniki

== League table ==
Pos	Team	Pld	W	D	L	GF	GA	GD	Pts	Qualification or relegation
1	Panathinaikos (C)	30	19	8	3	46	14	+32	46	Qualification for European Cup first round
2	Olympiacos	30	19	5	6	49	22	+27	43	Qualification for UEFA Cup first round
3	Iraklis	30	16	10	4	47	20	+27	42	
4	Aris	30	16	7	7	39	23	+16	39	
5	PAOK	30	11	13	6	33	29	+4	35	
6	AEL	30	13	6	11	28	29	−1	32	Qualification for Cup Winners' Cup first round (Note: Since Panathinaikos, winners of 1983–84 Greek Football Cup, was qualified for the 1984–85 European Cup, losing cup finalists AEL earned a spot in the first round of the 1984–85 European Cup Winners' Cup.)
7	AEK Athens	30	12	6	12	40	31	+9	30	
8	OFI	30	11	5	14	31	39	−8	27	
9	Ethnikos Piraeus	30	9	8	13	38	43	−5	26	
10	Apollon Athens	30	6	12	12	20	29	−9	24	
11	Doxa Drama	30	7	10	13	26	38	−12	24	
12	Apollon Kalamarias	30	8	8	14	28	44	−16	24	
13	Egaleo	30	9	6	15	25	47	−22	24	
14	Panionios	30	9	5	16	29	36	−7	23 (Note: Relegation play-out: Panionios–PAS Giannina 2–0.)	
15	PAS Giannina (R)	30	8	7	15	25	36	−11	23	Relegation to Beta Ethniki
16	Panserraikos (R)	30	6	6	18	25	49	−24	18	Relegation to Beta Ethniki

Source: RSSSF
Rules for classification: 1st points; 2nd decision match; 3rd head-to-head goal difference.
(C) Champions; (R) Relegated

== Results ==
Home \ Away	AEK	AEL	APA	APK	ARIS	DOX	EGA	ETH	IRA	OFI	OLY	PAO	PAN	PNS	PAOK	PAS
AEK Athens		1–1	1–1	3–3	2–0	1–0	3–0	5–1	1–3	2–0	2–1	0–2	4–1	1–0	4–0	2–0
AEL	2–0		1–0	2–0	0–1	1–0	1–0	3–0	0–0	2–1	1–0	1–0	1–0	1–0	1–1	1–0
Apollon Athens	1–1	1–0		1–0	0–0	1–1	0–1	1–1	0–0	0–0	0–1	0–1	1–0	0–0	0–0	2–0
Apollon Kalamarias	1–0	1–0	3–3		0–0	0–1	3–0	1–0	1–2	0–0	2–2	0–0	2–1	2–2	2–3	0–0
Aris	1–2	2–1	1–0	4–0		3–1	1–1	1–0	0–0	4–1	2–3	0–1	3–0	4–0	0–0	2–1
Doxa Drama	0–0	4–0	2–2	0–1	1–0		2–1	0–0	1–1	0–1	1–0	0–0	2–0	2–1	0–0	0–0
Egaleo	3–2	2–2	2–0	1–0	0–1	2–1		1–1	0–1	1–0	0–2	0–0	0–1	2–0	1–1	1–0
Ethnikos Piraeus	3–0	1–2	1–0	2–1	2–2	2–2	5–1		2–1	1–0	1–2	0–1	2–2	0–1	3–0	0–2
Iraklis	2–1	2–0	3–0	3–1	1–1	1–0	4–0	2–1		3–0	1–1	2–2	0–0	3–1	0–1	2–0
OFI	1–0	2–0	3–1	0–1	1–0	2–2	3–2	3–2	0–4		0–0	0–2	1–0	2–0	4–0	3–0
Olympiacos	1–0	3–0	1–0	3–1	0–1	2–0	5–0	3–1	2–0	2–0		2–1	3–0	2–1	1–0	5–1
Panathinaikos	0–0	2–1	2–1	3–0	5–1	2–0	1–0	2–0	2–1	2–0	0–0		2–0	5–0	0–0	3–1
Panionios	1–0	1–0	0–1	3–1	0–1	4–1	0–1	0–1	1–1	3–1	0–1	1–2		2–0	2–2	4–0
Panserraikos	0–2	1–0	0–0	0–1	0–1	3–1	2–1	2–3	1–3	2–2	1–0	2–2	0–1		0–1	3–1
PAOK	1–0	2–2	3–2	4–0	0–1	3–1	0–0	2–2	0–0	1–0	4–0	1–0	1–0	2–2		0–0
PAS Giannina	1–0	1–1	0–1	1–0	0–1	4–0	5–1	0–0	0–1	2–0	1–1	0–1	1–1	2–0	1–0	

Source: RSSSF
Legend: Blue = home team win; Yellow = draw; Red = away team win.

== Top scorers ==
Rank	Player	Club	Goals
1	(Greece) Nikos Anastopoulos	Olympiacos	18
2	(Greece) Grigoris Charalampidis	Panathinaikos	17
3	(Greece) Thomas Mavros	AEK Athens	13
4	(Greece) Vasilis Hatzipanagis	Iraklis	12
5	(Greece) Dinos Kouis	Aris	11
6	(Greece) Dimitris Saravakos	Panionios	10
7	(Greece) Dimitris Alexiou	OFI	9
7	(Greece) Thanasis Liolios	Ethnikos Piraeus	9
7	(Greece) Christos Dimopoulos	PAOK	9
7	(Greece) Kostas Batsinilas	Ethnikos Piraeus	9

== Attendances ==
Panathinaikos drew the highest average home attendance in the 1983–84 Alpha Ethniki.

#	Team	Average attendance
1	Panathinaikos	22,417
2	Olympiacos	19,325
3	Iraklis	16,559
4	AEK Athens	14,245
5	Aris	11,180
6	Ethnikos Piraeus	10,314
7	PAOK	10,099
8	AEL	9,151
9	Panionios	8,861
10	Egaleo	7,351
11	PAS Giannina	7,237
12	Apollon Athens	6,099
13	Apollon Kalamarias	5,923
14	OFI	5,549
15	Panserraikos	4,737
16	Doxa Drama	4,716
