= Giannis Psarras =

Greek footballer

Personal information
- Full name: Ioannis Psarras
- Date of birth: 27 April 1958 (age 68)
- Place of birth: Piraeus, Greece
- Position: Left back

Youth career
- –1975: Panachaiki

Senior career*
Years	Team	Apps	(Gls)
1975–1981	Panachaiki	164	(16)
1981–1987	PAOK	118	(8)
1987–	Panachaiki		
- Achaiki
- Atromitos Antirriou
1993	Panachaiki		

Managerial career
- 2000–2001: Niki Volos
- * Club domestic league appearances and goals

Giannis Psarras (Greek: Γιάννης Ψαρράς; born 27 April 1958) is a former Greek footballer who played as a left back for Panachaiki and PAOK.

== Career ==
Psarras began his football career in the youth ranks of Panachaiki. He was promoted to the first team in 1975 at the age of 17, quickly establishing himself as a reliable left-back in the top-tier Alpha Ethniki. During his initial six-year spell with the Patras-based club, he became a key player and helped the team reach the semi-finals of the Greek Cup in 1979.

In December 1981, Psarras moved to PAOK and became the first-ever winter transfer in the history of the club. He spent six seasons with the Thessaloniki club (1981–1987), making 149 appearances and scoring 9 goals in all competitions. The pinnacle of his career came in 1985, when he won the Greek league title with PAOK. During his tenure, he also featured in European competitions, most notably converting his penalty in the 9–8 penalty shootout defeat against Bayern Munich in the 1983–84 UEFA Cup.

He later returned to Panachaiki for brief stints before concluding his playing career in the lower divisions.

== Career statistics ==
Giannis Psarras in the Greek Championship
Club	Division	Season	Apps	Goals
Panachaiki	Alpha Ethniki	1975–76	8	0
Panachaiki	Alpha Ethniki	1976–77	28	3
Panachaiki	Alpha Ethniki	1977–78	30	4
Panachaiki	Alpha Ethniki	1978–79	34	2
Panachaiki	Alpha Ethniki	1979–80	33	5
Panachaiki	Alpha Ethniki	1980–81	31	2
Panachaiki	Total		164	16
PAOK	Alpha Ethniki	1981–82	17	0
PAOK	Alpha Ethniki	1982–83	31	1
PAOK	Alpha Ethniki	1983–84	25	4
PAOK	Alpha Ethniki	1984–85	2	0
PAOK	Alpha Ethniki	1985–86	17	1
PAOK	Alpha Ethniki	1986–87	21	1
PAOK	Alpha Ethniki	1987–88	5	1
PAOK	Total		118	8
Career total			282	24

Source: RSSSF

== Honours ==
PAOK

- Alpha Ethniki: 1984–85
