= 1981–82 Greek Football Cup =

1981–82 Greek Cup
Tournament details
- Country: Greece
- Teams: 58

Final positions
- Champions: Panathinaikos (7th title)
- Runners-up: AEL

Tournament statistics
- Matches played: 69
- Goals scored: 168 (2.43 per match)

The 1981–82 Greek Football Cup was the 40th edition of the Greek Football Cup.

== Tournament details ==
In total 58 teams participated, 18 from Alpha Ethniki and 40 from Beta Ethniki. It was held in 6 rounds, included final.

It was a competition that remained in history for one of the most discussed matches between the "eternal enemies", Panathinaikos and Olympiacos. The match was held in second round and took the spotlight of the tournament. The match which took place at Leoforos Alexandras Stadium was judged in extra time. There, Panathinaikos scored 3 times (2 goals with penalty, while they missed another one) and finished the match with 10 players, while Olympiacos scored twice and later scored once more, but was eventually cancelled. Αll these happened in first 12 minutes the match. Both clubs eventually expressed their complaints for the referee.

In other matches, PAOK won AEK Athens 6–1 and the qualifications of Panathinaikos, against Iraklis in extra time, while the administration of Panathinaikos had prohibited to entry television cameras in the second leg, and against PAOK in semi-finals with a goal to last minute of the second game.

In the final, they faced AEL who qualified for the first time in their history in a Greek Cup final. Panathinaikos won 1–0, however was not awarded the cup, but a commemorative trophy, since an objection by Olympiacos was pending at their expense, for the affair of outlaw Hellenisation of footballer Juan Ramón Rocha. The handing-over became two months later, after the end of those events.

== Calendar ==
Round	Date(s)	Fixtures	Clubs	New entries
First Round	24, 31 December 1981	28	58 → 29	58
Second Round	11 January 1982	12	29 → 16	none
Round of 16	3, 4, 24, 25 February 1982	16	16 → 8	none
Quarter-finals	31 March, 28 April 1982	8	8 → 4	none
Semi-finals	19 May, 2 June 1982	4	4 → 2	none
Final	19 June 1982	1	2 → 1	none

== Knockout phase ==
Each tie in the knockout phase, apart from the first two rounds and the final, was played over two legs, with each team playing one leg at home. The team that scored more goals on aggregate over the two legs advanced to the next round. If the aggregate score was level, the away goals rule was applied, i.e. the team that scored more goals away from home over the two legs advanced. If away goals were also equal, then extra time was played. The away goals rule was again applied after extra time, i.e. if there were goals scored during extra time and the aggregate score was still level, the visiting team advanced by virtue of more away goals scored. If no goals were scored during extra time, the winners were decided by a penalty shoot-out. In the first two rounds and the final, which were played as a single match, if the score was level at the end of normal time, extra time was played, followed by a penalty shoot-out if the score was still level.
The mechanism of the draws for each round is as follows:

- There are no seedings, and teams from the same group can be drawn against each other.

== First round ==
Team 1	Score	Team 2
Olympiacos	5–0	Apollon Athens
Kastoria	1–0	PAS Giannina
AEL	2–0	Olympiacos Volos
Apollon Kalamarias	1–3	Ethnikos Piraeus
Kavala	0–2	Iraklis
OFI	1–0	Agrotikos Asteras
Doxa Drama	4–0	Ethnikos Asteras
Ilisiakos	0–2	Panathinaikos
Veria	1–2	Korinthos
Panionios	5–2	Proodeftiki
PAOK	4–1	Panachaiki
Olympiakos Loutraki	0–0 (0–3 p)	Panserraikos
Rodos	2–1	Naoussa
Panetolikos	2–0	Niki Volos
Kozani	1–0	Anagennisi Giannitsa
Chalkida	2–1	Trikala
Acharnaikos	0–0 (1–3 p)	Makedonikos
Anagennisi Epanomi	2–1	Panargiakos
Atromitos Piraeus	1–2	Atromitos
Eordaikos	2–0	Panthrakikos
Irodotos	3–1 (a.e.t.)	Kilkisiakos
Xanthi	2–1	Anagennisi Karditsa
Kallithea	2–1	Vyzas Megara
Panegialios	1–0	Pierikos
Fostiras	2–2 (5–4 p)	Almopos Aridea
Egaleo	2–1	Chania
Toxotis Volos	2–1	Achaiki
Panelefsiniakos	2–3	AEK Athens
Diagoras	3–1	Aris

== Bracket ==
Second round
PAOK (bye)
AEK Athens (bye)
Kallithea	0
Panegialios (w/o)	2
Panionios	3
Irodotos	0
Kastoria	3
Atromitos	1
Anagennisi Epanomi (p)	0(5)
Rodos	0(4)
Makedonikos	0
Iraklis	2
Panathinaikos (a.e.t.)	3
Olympiacos	2
OFI	1
Panetolikos	0
Egaleo	2
Kozani	1
Korinthos (bye)
Toxotis Volos (a.e.t.)	2
Chalkida	1
Eordaikos	0
Ethnikos Piraeus	2
AEL	1
Xanthi	0
Fostiras	2
Panserraikos	1
Doxa Drama	0
Diagoras	1

Round of 16
PAOK	6	2	8
AEK Athens	1	2	3
Panegialios	0	1	1
Panionios	0	3	3
Kastoria	2	2	4
Anagennisi Epanomi	0	1	1
Iraklis	1	1	2
Panathinaikos (a.e.t.)	0	3	3
OFI	1	1	2
Egaleo	0	0	0
Korinthos	2	3	5
Toxotis Volos	1	2	3
Ethnikos Piraeus	0	0	0
AEL	1	0	1
Fostiras	0	1	1
Diagoras	0	2	2

Quarter-finals
PAOK (a)	1	1	2
Panionios	0	2	2
Kastoria	1	0	1
Panathinaikos	0	3	3
OFI	0	0	0(5)
Korinthos (p)	0	0	0(6)
AEL	1	0	1
Diagoras	0	0	0

Semi-finals
PAOK	1	0	1
Panathinaikos	0	2	2
Korinthos	1	1	2
AEL	0	3	3

Final
Panathinaikos	1
AEL	0

== Second round ==
Team 1	Score	Team 2
Anagennisi Epanomi	0–0 (5–4 p)	Rodos
Makedonikos	0–2	Iraklis
AEL	1–0	Xanthi
Doxa Drama	0–1	Diagoras
Panathinaikos	3–2 (a.e.t.)	Olympiacos
Egaleo	2–1	Kozani
Kastoria	3–1	Atromitos
Eordaikos	0–2	Ethnikos Piraeus
Fostiras	2–1	Panserraikos
Toxotis Volos	2–1 (a.e.t.)	Chalkida
Panionios	3–0	Irodotos
OFI	1–0	Panetolikos
Kallithea	0–2 (w/o)	Panegialios
PAOK	bye	
AEK Athens	bye	
Korinthos	bye	

== Round of 16 ==
Team 1	Agg.	Team 2	1st leg	2nd leg
OFI	2–0	Egaleo	1–0	1–0
Panegialios	1–3	Panionios	0–0	1–3
PAOK	8–3	AEK Athens	6–1	2–2
Fostiras	1–2	Diagoras	0–0	1–2
Iraklis	2–3	Panathinaikos	1–0	1–3 (a.e.t.)
Kastoria	4–1	Anagennisi Epanomi	2–0	2–1
Ethnikos Piraeus	0–1	AEL	0–1	0–0
Korinthos	5–3	Toxotis Volos	2–1	3–2

== Quarter-finals ==
Team 1	Agg.	Team 2	1st leg	2nd leg
Kastoria	1–3	Panathinaikos	1–0	0–3
OFI	0–0 (5–6 p)	Korinthos	0–0	0–0 (a.e.t.)
AEL	1–0	Diagoras	1–0	0–0
PAOK	(a) 2–2	Panionios	1–0	1–2

== Semi-finals ==
Team 1	Agg.	Team 2	1st leg	2nd leg
Korinthos	2–3	AEL	1–0	1–3
PAOK	1–2	Panathinaikos	1–0	0–2

== Final ==
19 June 1982
21:00 EEST

Panathinaikos	1–0	AEL
Charalampidis 49'	Report

AEK Stadium, Nea Filadelfia
Attendance: 22,560
Referee: Antonis Vassaras (Thessaloniki)
