= Theodoros Apostolidis =

Greek footballer (born 1952)

Personal information
- Full name: Theodoros Apostolidis
- Date of birth: 26 September 1952 (age 74)
- Place of birth: Kavala, Greece
- Position: Defender

Senior career*
| Years | Team | Apps | (Gls) |
| 1970–1972 | Bor | 0 | (0) |
| 1970 | → Mladost Bor (loan) | | |
| 1972–1975 | Makedonikos | | |
| 1975–1978 | Kastoria | 79 | (3) |
| 1978–1984 | PAOK | 115 | (4) |
- * Club domestic league appearances and goals

Theodoros Apostolidis (Greek: Θεόδωρος Αποστολίδης; born 26 September 1952) is a former Greek football defender.

== Career ==
Born in Kavala, he started playing in Yugoslavia with youth team of FK Bor. At start of 1970–71 season he was loaned to satellite club FK Mladost Bor. He later returned to Greece and played with Kastoria between 1975 and 1978. Then, during summer 1978, he signed with another Super League Greece club, PAOK, where he played for 6 seasons till 1984. He became one of the legendary players of PAOK with 115 league appearances.
