= Vasilios Georgopoulos =

Greek footballer

Personal information
- Full name: Vasilios Georgopoulos
- Date of birth: 15 March 1956 (age 70)
- Place of birth: Kalamata, Greece
- Height: 1.78 m (5 ft 10 in)
- Position: Midfielder

Youth career
- 1971–1972: Kalamata

Senior career*
Years	Team	Apps	(Gls)
1972–1977	Kalamata	31	(2)
1977–1980	Panachaiki	47	(2)
1980–1984	PAOK	96	(6)
1984–1986	Panionios	17	(0)
1986	AEK Athens	2	(0)
1986–1988	Kalamata		
Total		193	(10)

International career
1974	Greece U19		
1984	Greece	2	(0)

Managerial career
- 2000–2001: Kalamata
- 2007–2008: PAO Varda
- 2009–2010: Greece women
- 2010–2014: Greece U19 (assistant)
- 2014–2018: Greece U17
- * Club domestic league appearances and goals

Vasilios Georgopoulos (Greek: Βασίλειος Γεωργόπουλος; born 15 March 1956) is a Greek retired football midfielder and later manager.

== Club career ==
Georgopoulos started his football career at the age of just 15 at Kalamata in 1971. In 1972, he was promoted to the men's team, where he played until the summer of 1977, when he was acquired by Panachaiki. He played for the club of Patras for 3 seasons, recording 55 appearances and 3 goals.

He was exuberant and creative footballer and his performances earned him a transfer to PAOK in the summer of 1980. With the black and white jersey he competed in 96 matches and scored 6 goals, while he also became an international.

In the summer of 1984, he moved to Panionios and played there for 2 seasons, making 17 appearances.

On 15 July 1986 Georgopoulos was transferred to AEK Athens. There he did not earn the trust of the manager, Ab Fafié resulting in him playing 2 times and before he was released in December of the same year.

On 19 December Georgopoulos returned to Kalamata, where he ended his football career in 1988. He made a total of 201 appearances and scored 11 goals in the first division.

== International career ==
Georgopoulos made 2 appearances with Greece in 1984.

== Managerial career ==
Georgopoulos enacted with coaching at the academies of Kalamata and later with the men's team. In 2000 the team under his guidance reached the semi-finals of the Cup, while they finished 9th in the league and qualified for the following season's UEFA Intertoto Cup. Afterwards he had spells at the benches of various clubs such as Asteras Tripolis, Pamisos Messini and PAO Varda. From 2009 to 2010 he was the manager of the women's national team and from 2010 to 2014 he served as an assistant manager of the Greece U19. In 2014 he became the manager of Greece U17, until 2018. Afterwards he served chief scout at Olympiacos for 2 years and in 2020 he returned to Kalamata and assumed the position of the academy director until 2022. From 2024 to 2002 he also served Kalamata as their chief scout.
