= Vasilios Vasilakos =

Greek footballer

Personal information
- Date of birth: 7 September 1960 (age 66)
- Place of birth: Volos, Greece
- Position: Attacking midfielder

Youth career
- –1979: Almyros Volos

Senior career*
Years	Team	Apps	(Gls)
1979–1987	PAOK	171	(28)
1987–1988	AEK Athens	23	(4)
1988–1991	Panionios	36	(4)
1991–1994	Olympiacos Volos		
Total		230	(40)
- * Club domestic league appearances and goals

Vasilios Vasilakos (Greek: Βασίλειος Βασιλάκος; born 7 September 1960) is a Greek former professional footballer, who played as an attacking midfielder.

== Club career ==
Vasilakos started his football career from Almyros Volos and in the summer of 1979 he was transferred to PAOK. He played with PAOK for 8 seasons, where he won the Championship in 1985 and played as a finalist in 2 Greek Cup finals in 1983 and in 1985.

On 15 July 1987, Vasilakos was transferred to AEK Athens for a fee of 10 million drachmas. He stood out for his good execution in set-pieces but also for his ability in assists, a fact that made his then teammate, Henrik Nielsen the top scorer of the league, credit him with a large part of his success. His goal against PAOK at Toumba Stadium on 6 September 1987 made him the only footballer to have scored in the Toumba stadium, in a Double-headed eagles derby, playing for both clubs. However, the name of Vasilakos was associated with one of the biggest scandals of the season. AEK were drawn to face Olympiacos in the third round of the Greek Cup. In the first match at Karaiskakis Stadium, AEK took the lead with a direct foul by Vasilakos, but were equalized. The rematch took place on February 10 in Nea Filadelfeia, a few days after the impressive victory of the "yellow-blacks" against Olympiacos for the championship, at the same stadium. On the eve of the match, a big scandal broke out when AEK complained that the president of Olympiacos, George Koskotasis tried to bribe both Vasilakos and the goalkeeper, Theologis Papadopoulos through the team's former player Dinos Ballis. AEK were defeated by 1–3 and were eliminated. In the trial that followed, the only one who will be punished for attempted bribery is Balis. The "fallout" of this case affected the team in the league race, which, combined with another scandal, that of the "Tsingov case" was eventually lost. Vasilakos was released from the club as his name was marked from this scandal.

On 11 July 1988 he signed for Panionios alongside Papadopoulos. There, he played for 3 season and managed compete in yet another Cup final in 1989, losing 3–1 to Panathinaikos. He then moved to Olympiacos Volos before ending his career in 1994.

== After football ==
Vasilakos lives in Thessaloniki and is quite often hosted on local radio stations, where he comments on the happenings of PAOK.

== Honours ==
PAOK

- Alpha Ethniki: 1984–85
