= 1978–79 AEK Athens F.C. season =

AEK Athens
1978–79 season
- Chairman: Loukas Barlos
- Manager: Ferenc Puskás (until 17 March); Andreas Stamatiadis
- Stadium: AEK Stadium
- Alpha Ethniki: 1st
- Greek Cup: Runners-up
- European Cup: Second round
- Top goalscorer: League: Thomas Mavros (31); All: Thomas Mavros (40)
- Highest home attendance: 35,000 vs Nottingham Forest (18 October 1978)
- Lowest home attendance: 2,204 vs Kavala (8 November 1978)
- Average home league attendance: 14,972
- Biggest win: AEK Athens 7–0 Kavala
- Biggest defeat: Nottingham Forest 5–1 AEK Athens
Home colours

The 1978–79 season was the 55th season in the existence of AEK Athens F.C. and the 20th consecutive season in the top flight of Greek football. They competed in the Alpha Ethniki, the Greek Cup and the European Cup. The season began on 3 September 1978 and finished on 16 June 1979.

== Overview ==
The peculiarities of the 1978–79 season could well mark it as historic for the Greek Football, while it was also the last semi-professional season as with the enactment of law 879/79 in March, all the football clubs were obliged to be converted into S.A. to participate in the first professional championship of the next season. In the summer, there was an "epidemic" of transfers by iconic players among the major clubs, with AEK not suffering any "casualties". Georgios Delikaris moved from Olympiacos to Panathinaikos, Antonis Antoniadis followed the opposite path and Mimis Domazos left Panathinaikos. Loukas Barlos seized the chance and signed him to AEK. Thus, AEK had in their roster at the same time the two best Greek footballers of the century, both born in 1942 and named "Mimis": Papaioannou and Domazos. The addition of the Domazos to the squad, with his leadership skills and tactical mind, gave the already impressive team, the element that made them one of the most spectacular that have ever played in the Greek stadiums. Furthermore, after the departure of the manager that won them the domestic double winner, Zlatko Čajkovski for Zürich, Barlos brought to the club's bench the great Ferenc Puskás, who alongside Domazos were the architects of Panathinaikos' campaign to the 1971 European Cup Final, hoping that AEK would do a similar breakthrough at the European stage.

In the Championship, AEK started impressively and were ahead in the standings, with Olympiacos being their only rival for the title. While AEK were generously scattering goals and spectacle, while in the opposite of the event, there were many official complaints of the opponents of Olympiacos for attempts of bribery. In the 12th matchday, Oikonomou of Apollon Athens and on the 23rd and the goalkeeper of PAS Giannina, Lisa, reported of bribery on the side of Olympiacos and on the 32nd matchday, after their match against Olympiacos, Rodos punished Doxakis, Papaoikonomou and Skartados for having reduced performance in the match as Olympiacos turned their 3–1 lead in 23 minutes, with the help of the referee as well.

AEK also started their obligations in the European Cup against Porto. The quality of the opponent and the fullness of AEK foreshadowed two ambiguous matches with an uncertain outcome. In Nea Filadelfeia, AEK and their fans experienced a magical European night and witnessed the club's biggest victory in the European Cup with 6–1, which gave AEK a largely securing qualification to the next round. In the rematch AEK opened the score in the first half and in the last half hour of the match they turned off the engines as the Portuguese grabbed the opportunity and scored four goals. Next opponent for AEK, Brian Clough's Nottingham Forest. The "reds" having learned not to underestimate their opponents and being aware of AEK's impressive performance against Porto, came to Nea Filadelfeia for the first leg, completely focused on their goal. Nottingham took the lead early on and at the 21st minute, AEK were left with 10 players after the suspension of Milton Viera. At the end of the half Nottingham doubled their lead and until the match was over the Englishmen played conservatively with AEK managing to reduce in the final 1–2. In the second leg AEK entered the pitch knowing well that a difficult night that awaited them. In the first half, Nottingham easily scored three goals having lost several opportunities to a widen the score, while at the second half, AEK reduced to 3–1 with a header from Bajević. Nottingham completed their imposing appearance with a 5–1 victory and eventually won the trophy.

Towards the end of the Championship, AEK presented an inexplicable decline in their performance and in the face of the risk of losing the title after the away defeat by Aris on March 11, Barlos decided to remove Puskás from bench of the team and assigned it to his assistant, Andreas Stamatiadis for the rest of the season. In the Cup, it was the first year that the two legged tie, for the quarter-finals and the semi-finals were established, according to the model of European cups. AEK marched through the first three rounds eliminating Kavala, Proodeftiki and Acharnaikos, respectively. In the quarter-final against Anagennisi Epanomi after a 1–1 away draw, AEK won 2–0 in the second leg and qualified to the semi-finals where they faced Panachaiki. In Patras, they were defeated by 3–2, but at home AEK won easily by 5–1. In the final AEK met Panionios who came from two consecutive unexpected qualifications. In the match, while AEK managed to take the lead early on, Panionios succeeded in putting AEK to "sleep", by not letting them impose their frenetic tempo and completed the comeback winning by 3–1, in one of the biggest surprises in the history of the institution.

The end of the Championship found AEK and Olympiacos, even in the first place with 56 points and a play-off match for the title was set. Olympiacos either in fear of a possible embarrassment from AEK, or as part of an unofficial deal with the HFF in exchange for silencing allegations of bribery and consequently avoiding relegation, were not going to show up to the match. The excuse was the protest for the refereeing of Charalampos Pamporidis against OFI in the last matchday, considering him responsible for not managing to complete the comeback of a 3–1 loss that would resulted in winning the league. On June 16, at the stadium on Leoforos Alexandras Stadium, AEK were the only team lined up on the pitch. The absence of Olympiacos automatically declared AEK champion with a 2–0 victory without a match. During the season AEK were an unstoppable football machine that dismantled their opponents as they achieved the league's best offense with a total of 90 goals, rewarding their opponents 6 times with 5 goals and 2 with 7 goals. Thomas Mavros was declared the top scorer of the league with 31 goals and 40 in total, winning the European Silver Shoe, just 3 goals behind Kees Kist. In the third place of the top scorers of the league was Dušan Bajević with 24 goals and in the 8th, Takis Nikoloudis with 12. That season would be the last at AEK for the emblematic leader, Mimis Papaioannou which after 17 consecutive years of presence, he would be passed on the pantheon of the legends in the history of the club.

== Management team ==
Position	Staff
Manager	(Greece) Andreas Stamatiadis
Assistant manager	(Greece) Giorgos Kefalidis
Fitness coach	(Czechoslovakia) František Fadrhonc
Goalkeeping coach	(Greece) Stelios Serafidis
Academy director	(Czechoslovakia) František Fadrhonc
Academy manager	(Greece) Stelios Serafidis
Head of Medical	(Greece) Lakis Nikolaou

== Players ==
=== Squad information ===
NOTE: The players are the ones that have been announced by the AEK Athens' press release. No edits should be made unless a player arrival or exit is announced. Updated 16 June 1979, 23:59 UTC+3.

Player	Nat.	Position(s)	Date of birth (Age)	Signed	Previous club	Transfer fee	Contract until
Goalkeepers
Nikos Christidis	(Greece)	GK	2 August 1944 (aged 34)	1976	(Greece) Aris	₯1,500,000	1984
Lakis Stergioudas	(Greece)	GK	11 December 1952 (aged 26)	1972	(Greece) Niki Polygyros	₯36,000	1981
Defenders
Apostolos Toskas	(Greece)	CB	28 December 1947 (aged 31)	1969	(Greece) Trikala	₯1,500,000	1981
Lakis Nikolaou (Captain)	(Greece)	CB / RB / ST / RW	17 July 1949 (aged 29)	1971	(Greece) Atromitos	₯600,000	1979
Babis Intzoglou	(Greece)	RB / LB / CB	1 April 1949 (aged 30)	1976	(Greece) Panionios	₯3,000,000	1984
Giannis Mousouris	(Greece)	RB / RM / ST	26 January 1951 (aged 28)	1977	(Greece) AEL	₯2,500,000	1985
Petros Ravousis	(Greece)	CB / RB	1 October 1954 (aged 24)	1972	(Greece) Aetos Skydra	Free	1981
Aris Damianidis	(Greece)	CB / RB	2 March 1955 (aged 24)	1977	(Greece) Egaleo	₯3,500,000	1985
Dimitris Kotsos	(Greece)	LB	30 March 1955 (aged 24)	1978	(Greece) Kastoria	Free	1986
Theodoros Apostolopoulos	(Greece)	RB / LB	17 September 1956 (aged 22)	1978	(Greece) AEK Athens U20	—	1986
Midfielders
Mimis Domazos	(Greece)	AM / SS	22 January 1942 (aged 37)	1978	(Greece) Panathinaikos	Free	1979
Milton Viera	(Uruguay)	CM / DM	11 May 1946 (aged 33)	1977	(Greece) Olympiacos	Free	1980
Lazaros Papadopoulos	(Greece)	RM / RB / LM / LB / RW / LW	3 January 1950 (aged 29)	1973	(Greece) Veria	₯1,300,000	1981
Takis Nikoloudis	(Greece)	CM / AM / RM / LM	26 August 1951 (aged 27)	1976	(Greece) Iraklis	Free	1984
Dionysis Tsamis	(Greece)	CM / DM / AM	17 October 1951 (aged 27)	1972	(Greece) Panetolikos	₯2,350,000	1981
Christos Ardizoglou	(Greece) (Israel)	RM / LM / RW / LW / AM / RB / LB	25 March 1953 (aged 26)	1974	(Greece) Apollon Athens	₯12,000,000	1982
Giorgos Vlantis	(Greece)	CM / AM	30 January 1958 (aged 21)	1976	(Greece) AEK Athens U20	—	1984
Forwards
Mimis Papaioannou (Vice-captain)	(Greece)	SS / ST / AM / RW	17 November 1942 (aged 36)	1962	(Greece) Veria	₯175,000	1980
Dušan Bajević	(Socialist Federal Republic of Yugoslavia)	ST / SS	10 December 1948 (aged 30)	1977	(Socialist Federal Republic of Yugoslavia) Velež Mostar	Free	1980
Tasos Konstantinou	(Cyprus)	RW / SS / ST / RM / AM	11 March 1951 (aged 28)	1972	(Cyprus) EPA Larnaca	₯600,000	1980
Thomas Mavros	(Greece)	ST / LW	31 May 1954 (aged 25)	1976	(Greece) Panionios	₯10,000,000	1983
Dimitris Kokkinopoulos	(Greece)	RW / RM	1955 (aged 23–24)	1978	(Greece) AEK Athens U20	—	1986
From Reserve Squad
Spyros Ikonomopoulos	(Greece)	GK	25 July 1959 (aged 19)	1977	(Greece) AO Akratas	—	
Panagiotis Stylianopoulos	(Greece)	RB / LB / RM / DM	4 September 1957 (aged 21)	—	(Greece) AEK Athens U20	—	
Christos Kalaitzidis	(Greece)	LM / LW / LB	6 February 1959 (aged 20)	1973	(Greece) PO.K.E.	—	

== Transfers ==
=== In ===
Pos.	Player	From	Fee	Date	Contract Until	Source
DF	(Greece) Theodoros Apostolopoulos	(Greece) AEK Athens U20	Promotion	31 August 1978	30 June 1986	
DF	(Greece) Dimitris Kotsos	(Greece) Kastoria	Free transfer	14 July 1978	30 June 1986	
MF	(Greece) Mimis Domazos	(Greece) Panathinaikos	Free transfer	13 July 1978	30 June 1979	
FW	(Greece) Dimitris Kokkinopoulos	(Greece) AEK Athens U20	Promotion	31 July 1978	30 June 1986	

=== Out ===
Pos.	Player	To	Fee	Date	Source
GK	(Greece) Giorgos Sidiropoulos	(Greece) AEL	Contract termination	29 July 1978	
DF	(Greece) Stefanos Theodoridis	(Greece) Olympiacos	Contract termination	17 July 1978	
MF	(Greece) Fotis Outsikas	(Greece) Acharnaikos	Contract termination	17 August 1978	
MF	(Greece) Giorgos Vlachonikolis	(Greece) Ilisiakos	Contract termination	10 August 1978	

=== Contract renewals ===
Pos.	Player	Date	Former Exp. Date	New Exp. Date	Source
FW	(Socialist Federal Republic of Yugoslavia) Dušan Bajević	18 June 1979	30 June 1979	31 June 1980	

=== Overall transfer activity ===
Expenditure: ▼ ₯0

Income: ▲ ₯0

Net Total: ₯0

== Pre-season and friendlies ==
2 August 1978 Friendly	AEK Athens	1–1	Nottingham Forest	Nea Filadelfeia
21:00 EEST (UTC+3)	Viera 69'	Report	Woodcock 15'	Stadium: AEK Stadium; Attendance: 28,911; Referee: Alexopoulos (Athens)

7 August 1978 Parthenon tournament	AEK Athens	0–2	Steaua București	Nea Filadelfeia
21:30 EEST (UTC+3)	Konstantinou (penalty missed) 31'	Report	Troi 38'; Răducanu 81'	Stadium: AEK Stadium; Attendance: 13,255; Referee: Manolis Platopoulos (Athens)

9 August 1978 Parthenon tournament	AEK Athens	3–2	Zbrojovka Brno	Nea Filadelfeia
19:30 EEST (UTC+3)	Bajević 30', 62'; Papadopoulos 75'	Report	Kopenec 69'; Hausti 80'	Stadium: AEK Stadium; Attendance: 15,000; Referee: Christos Charalampidis (Athens)

16 August 1978 Friendly	AEK Athens	3–1	Club Brugge	Nea Filadelfeia
21:00 EEST (UTC+3)	Konstantinou 14', 38'; Ravousis 85'	Report	Courant 77'	Stadium: AEK Stadium; Attendance: 9,604; Referee: K. Kritikos

19 August 1978 Friendly	La Louvière	3–4	AEK Athens	La Louvière
20:30 EEST (UTC+3)	Dardenne 10'; De Bolle 20'; Rohde 68'	Report	Bajević 18'; Nikoloudis 21', 78'; Ardizoglou 24'	Stadium: Stade du Tivoli; Attendance: 9,000; Referee: Jean-Claude Jourquin (Belgium)

22 August 1978 Friendly	Beveren	3–1	AEK Athens	Beveren
21:00 EEST (UTC+3)	Stevens 23'; Truyens 37'; Albert 50'	Report	Nikoloudis 48'; Domazos (yellow card) 49'	Stadium: Freethiel Stadion; Attendance: 4,500; Referee: Marcel Van Langenhove (Belgium)

23 August 1978 Friendly	Cercle Brugge	0–1	AEK Athens	Bruges
21:00 EEST (UTC+3)		Report	Kalaitzidis 19'	Stadium: Jan Breydel Stadium; Attendance: 4,000; Referee: Roger Verhaeghe (Belgium)

27 August 1978 Friendly	Chalkida	0–2	AEK Athens	Chalcis
17:30 EEST (UTC+3)	Tziortzis (yellow card) 75'	Report	Nikoloudis 37'; Papaioannou 80'	Stadium: Municipal Stadium of Chalkida; Attendance: 3,109; Referee: Antonis Patrikas (Euboea)

30 August 1978 Friendly	AEK Athens	1–0	OFI	Nea Filadelfeia
17:30 EEST (UTC+3)	Bajević 37'	Report		Stadium: AEK Stadium; Attendance: 7,120; Referee: Louizos

21 September 1978 Friendly	AEK Athens	7–0	Ionikos	Nea Filadelfeia
16:30 EEST (UTC+3)	Domazos 12'; Ardizoglou 30' (pen.); Kokkinopoulos 36'; Papaioannou 47', 84'; Viera 65'; Vlantis 79'	Report		Stadium: AEK Stadium; Referee: Ferenc Puskás

4 October 1978 Friendly	AEK Athens	3–5	New York Cosmos	Nea Filadelfeia
20:30 EEST (UTC+3)	Mavros 6', 13', 82'	Report	Seninho 3'; Chinaglia 50', 64', 66'; Tueart 52'	Stadium: AEK Stadium; Attendance: 16,526; Referee: Stelios Marinelis (Athens)

25 October 1978 Friendly	Velež Mostar	4–2	AEK Athens	Mostar
19:00 EEST (UTC+3)	Jakirović 30'; Papadopoulos 40' (o.g.); Vladić 56' (pen.); Bijedić 61'	Report	Papaioannou 46'; Kalaitzidis 86'	Stadium: Bijeli Brijeg; Attendance: 15,000; Referee: Zoran Rebac (Yugoslavia)
Note: Friendly match as part of the transfer of Dušan Bajević from the previous season. At the 61st minute after Velež made it 4–1, the squad of AEK went to withdraw from the game due to the unfair refereeing at their expense, but with the intervention of Bajević, the match continued normally.

26 November 1978 Friendly	AEK Athens	4–2	Saudi Arabia	Nea Filadelfeia
15:00 EET (UTC+2)	Papaioannou 40'; Kalaitzidis 56' (pen.), 86'; Kokkinopoulos 62'	Report	Al-Saqeer 70'; I. Khalifa 78'	Stadium: AEK Stadium; Attendance: 1,204; Referee: Leonidas Printezis (Athens)

3 December 1978 Friendly	AEK Athens	3–2	Preußen Münster	Nea Filadelfeia
15:00 EET (UTC+2)	Konstantinou 25' (pen.); Bajević 41'; Chatziioannidis 68'	Report	Gede 8'; Schütte 65'	Stadium: AEK Stadium; Attendance: 1,604; Referee: K. Kritikos

15 March 1979 Friendly	AEK Athens	2–2	Greece amateur	Nea Filadelfeia
15:00 EET (UTC+2)	Vlachos 65'; Domazos 78'	Report	Stafylas 10'; Xanthopoulos 89'	Stadium: AEK Stadium; Attendance: 500; Referee: Alekos Sofianidis
Note: Stylianopoulos, Kalaitzidis and Stafylas (from the reserve team of AEK) who were in the squad of Greece amateur, competed against AEK. Chatziioannidis who was also in the squad of Greece amateur, played one half with each team.

4 April 1979 Friendly	AEK Athens	5–3	Greece military	Nea Filadelfeia
16:30 EEST (UTC+3)	Bajević 5', 22', 27'; Domazos 32'; Stafylas 85'	Report	Mavros 11'; Kostikos 25'; Psarras 79'	Stadium: AEK Stadium; Attendance: 3,000; Referee: Andreas Stamatiadis
Note: Ravousis, Damianidis, Ardizoglou and Mavros played with Greece military against AEK, since they were serving in the Greek Army at the time.

1 May 1979 Friendly	OFI	1–1	AEK Athens	Heraklion
16:30 EEST (UTC+3)	Karaiskos (penalty missed) 8'; D. Papadopoulos 54'; Papadimitriou (penalty missed) 82'	Report	Bajević 50'	Stadium: Theodoros Vardinogiannis Stadium; Attendance: 2,333; Referee: Giorgos Kounalakis (Heraklion)

10 May 1979 Friendly	AEL	2–0	AEK Athens	Larissa
17:30 EEST (UTC+3)	Yfantis 10'; Vouroukos 18'	Report		Stadium: Alcazar Stadium; Attendance: 7,000; Referee: Vangelis Tsoumanis (Larissa)
Note: Friendly match as part of the transfer of Giannis Mousouris from the previous season. AEL used Spyros Thodis of Anagennisi Karditsa and Enver Hadžiabdić of Velež Mostar.

6 June 1979 Mimis Papaioannou Testimonial	AEK Athens	2–3	PAOK	Nea Filadelfeia
20:00 EEST (UTC+3)	M. Papaioannou (penalty missed) 16'; Schachner 48'; D. Papadopoulos 60'	Report	Guerino 38' (pen.); Koudas 71', 83'	Stadium: AEK Stadium; Attendance: 8,777; Referee: Manolis Platopoulos (Athens)
Note: AEK played with a mixed team. Specifically, Giannis Venos and Georgios Firos of Aris, Fanis Theofanous of Pezoporikos, Manolis Kottis of Rodos, Walter Schachner of Austria Wien, Kurt Jara of Duisburg, Thanasis Pantelidis of PAS Giannina, Andreas Eleftheriadis of Veria, Themis Vangis of Egaleo, Antonis Antoniadis of Olympiacos, Michalis Tzirakis and Dimitrios Papadopoulos of OFI, Grigoris Nikoloudis, Charalampos Xanthopoulos and Vasilis Hatzipanagis of Iraklis and Lakis Papaioannou of Pierikos competed with AEK.

== Competitions ==
=== Overall record ===
Competition	First match	Last match	Starting round	Final position	Record							
Competition	First match	Last match	Starting round	Final position	Pld	W	D	L	GF	GA	GD	Win %
Alpha Ethniki	3 September 1978	3 June 1979	Matchday 1	Winners	34	25	6	3	90	60	+30	73.53
Championship play-off	16 June 1979		Final	Winners	1	1	0	0	2	0	+2	100.00
Greek Cup	8 November 1978	9 June 1979	First round	Runners-up	8	5	1	2	24	8	+16	62.50
European Cup	13 September 1978	1 November 1978	First round	Second round	4	1	0	3	9	12	−3	25.00
Total					47	32	7	8	125	80	+45	68.09

Last updated: 16 June 1979
Source: Competitions

=== Alpha Ethniki ===
==== League table ====
Pos	Team	Pld	W	D	L	GF	GA	GD	Pts	Qualification or relegation
1	AEK Athens (Note: AEK Athens pronounced champions, because Olympiacos did not show up for the play-off match.) (C)	34	25	6	3	90	30	+60	56	Qualification for European Cup first round
2	Olympiacos	34	26	4	4	63	27	+36	56	Qualification for UEFA Cup first round
3	Aris	34	22	6	6	63	26	+37	50	Qualification for UEFA Cup first round
4	PAOK	34	18	9	7	73	23	+50	45	
5	Panathinaikos	34	14	10	10	46	37	+9	38	

Source: RSSSF
Rules for classification: 1st points; 2nd decision match; 3rd head-to-head goal difference.
(C) Champions

==== Results summary ====
Overall								Home						Away					
Pld	W	D	L	GF	GA	GD	Pts	W	D	L	GF	GA	GD	W	D	L	GF	GA	GD
34	25	6	3	90	30	+60	56	15	2	0	62	12	+50	10	4	3	28	18	+10

Source: Competitive matches

==== Results by Matchday ====
Round	1	2	3	4	5	6	7	8	9	10	11	12	13	14	15	16	17	18	19	20	21	22	23	24	25	26	27	28	29	30	31	32	33	34
Ground	A	H	A	H	A	H	A	H	H	A	H	A	H	A	H	A	A	H	A	H	A	H	A	H	A	A	H	A	H	A	H	A	H	H
Result	W	W	W	W	W	D	L	W	W	D	W	W	W	D	W	W	D	W	L	D	W	W	L	W	W	W	W	D	W	W	W	W	W	W
Position	3	2	2	1	1	1	3	2	1	2	2	2	1	1	1	1	1	1	3	3	3	2	3	3	3	2	2	2	2	2	2	2	2	1

Source: Competitive matches
A = Away; H = Home; W = Win; D = Draw; L = Loss; P = Postponed

==== Matches ====
3 September 1978 1	Egaleo	0–2	AEK Athens	Aigaleo
17:00 EEST (UTC+3)	M. Konstantinou (yellow card) 51'; Konstantopoulos (yellow card) 67'		Mavros 48'; Bajević 67'	Stadium: Aigaleo Municipal Stadium; Attendance: 10,206; Referee: Nikos Lampropoulos (Elis)

10 September 1978 2	AEK Athens	3–2	PAOK	Nea Filadelfeia
17:00 EET (UTC+2)	Bajević (yellow card); Ravousis (yellow card); Mavros 1'; Domazos 65', 86'		Damanakis (yellow card); Intzoglou 14' (o.g.); Koudas 88'	Stadium: AEK Stadium; Attendance: 27,854; Referee: Grippas (Kavala)

24 September 1978 3	Olympiacos	0–1	AEK Athens	Piraeus
16:30 EEST (UTC+3)	S. Papadopoulos (yellow card) 5'		Bajević 22'; Stergioudas (yellow card) 88'	Stadium: Karaiskakis Stadium; Attendance: 38,934; Referee: Antonis Vassaras (Thessaloniki)

1 October 1978 4	AEK Athens	5–1	Iraklis	Nea Filadelfeia
15:30 EEST (UTC+3)	Nikoloudis 8'; Bajević 72' (pen.), 79', 81'; Mavros 85'		Chatzieleftheriou 38'	Stadium: AEK Stadium; Attendance: 16,595; Referee: Dimitris Pantzalis (Piraeus)

14 October 1978 5	Panionios	0–1	AEK Athens	Nea Smyrni
	Balafas (yellow card) 54'; Moraitelis (yellow card) 78'		Bajević (yellow card) 54'; Nikoloudis 75'	Stadium: Nea Smyrni Stadium; Attendance: 9,951; Referee: Vasilis Patarakis (Piraeus)

21 October 1978 6	AEK Athens	1–1	Aris	Nea Filadelfeia
15:00 EEST (UTC+3)	Domazos 20'; Ravousis (yellow card) 60'; Konstantinou (penalty missed) 65'		Firos (yellow card) 27'; Zindros 32'	Stadium: AEK Stadium; Attendance: 10,660; Referee: Giannis Tsionas (Larissa)

5 November 1978 7	Ethnikos Piraeus	3–1	AEK Athens	Piraeus
14:30 EET (UTC+2)	Makaratzis 60'; Mitropoulos 85', 89'		Mavros 71'	Stadium: Karaiskakis Stadium; Attendance: 24,067; Referee: Kostas Karakitsos (Athens)

12 November 1978 8	AEK Athens	4–0	Panachaiki	Nea Filadelfeia
14:30 EET (UTC+2)	Nikoloudis 3'; Mavros 28'; Papadopoulos 47'; Ardizoglou 63'; Ravousis (yellow card) 84'			Stadium: AEK Stadium; Attendance: 8,704; Referee: Nikos Lagogiannis (Piraeus)

19 November 1978 9	AEK Athens	2–0	Apollon Athens	Nea Filadelfeia
14:30 EET (UTC+2)	Nikolaou (red card) 20'; Mavros 30'; Ardizoglou 38'		Papadimitriou (red card) 20'; Vrettos (yellow card) 76'	Stadium: AEK Stadium; Attendance: 10,257; Referee: Aristeidis Lekkas (Piraeus)

10 December 1978 10	Panathinaikos	2–2	AEK Athens	Ampelokipoi
14:30 EET (UTC+2)	Álvarez 6'; Giannakoulas (yellow card) 19'; Eleftheriadis 22' (pen.)		Bajević 25'; Mavros (penalty missed) 56', 67'	Stadium: Leoforos Alexandras Stadium; Attendance: 23,150; Referee: Panagiotis Tsolakidis (Thessaloniki)

17 December 1978 11	AEK Athens	2–1	Kastoria	Nea Filadelfeia
14:30 EET (UTC+2)	Ravousis (yellow card); Ardizoglou 45'; Mousouris 81'		Stavridis (yellow card) (yellow-red card) 87'; Strebov (yellow card); Papetas 52'	Stadium: AEK Stadium; Attendance: 10,606; Referee: Kostas Karakitsos (Lamia)

24 December 1978 12	Rodos	0–1	AEK Athens	Ialysos
14:30 EET (UTC+2)			Kotsos (yellow card) 37'; Mavros 72'; Toskas (yellow card) 76'	Stadium: Municipal Stadium Ekonomideio; Attendance: 4,552; Referee: Dimitris Pantzalis (Piraeus)

31 December 1978 13	AEK Athens	5–0	Panserraikos	Nea Filadelfeia
14:30 EET (UTC+2)	Mavros 23'; Bajević 20' (pen.), 32' (pen.), 40' (pen.), 54'		Zisis (yellow card) 21'	Stadium: AEK Stadium; Attendance: 9,223; Referee: Giorgos Katsoras (Thessaloniki)

7 January 1979 14	OFI	0–0	AEK Athens	Heraklion
14:30 EET (UTC+2)	Papadimitriou (yellow card); Tzirakis (yellow card)		Mousouris (yellow card)	Stadium: Theodoros Vardinogiannis Stadium; Attendance: 8,228; Referee: Panagiotis Tsolakidis (Thessaloniki)

14 January 1979 15	AEK Athens	4–2	AEL	Nea Filadelfeia
14:30 EET (UTC+2)	Nikoloudis 23'; Mavros 28', 32', 45'; Viera (yellow card) 71'		Kritikos 61' (pen.); Selionis (yellow card) 82'; Mousiaris 84'	Stadium: AEK Stadium; Attendance: 11,436; Referee: Giannis Triantafyllou (Dodecanese)

26 December 1979 16	Kavala	1–2	AEK Athens	Kavala
14:30 EET (UTC+2)	Kalaitzidis (yellow card); Mana 87'		Mavros 17', 63'	Stadium: Kavala National Stadium; Attendance: 9,651; Referee: Tsoukaladelis (Lamia)

28 January 1979 17	PAS Giannina	1–1	AEK Athens	Ioannina
15:00 EET (UTC+2)	Glasmanis (yellow card) 13'; Kontogeorgakis 15'; Papangelis (yellow card) 17'; Seitaridis (yellow card) 58'		Kotsos (yellow card) 71'; Papaioannou 81'	Stadium: Zosimades Stadium; Attendance: 11,166; Referee: Grippas

4 February 1979 18	AEK Athens	5–0	Egaleo	Nea Filadelfeia
15:00 EET (UTC+2)	Mavros 3', 12', 60'; Bajević 27'; Domazos 70'			Stadium: AEK Stadium; Attendance: 13,402; Referee: Manolis Platopoulos (Athens)

11 February 1979 19	PAOK	2–1	AEK Athens	Thessaloniki
15:00 EET (UTC+2)	Guerino 49' (pen.); Koudas (red card) 56'; Kostikos 84'		Ravousis (yellow card) 20' (yellow-red card) 40'; Bajević 88'	Stadium: Kaftanzoglio Stadium; Attendance: 41,909; Referee: Kostas Dedes (Messinia)

18 February 1979 20	AEK Athens	0–0	Olympiacos	Nea Filadelfeia
15:00 EET (UTC+2)			S. Papadopoulos (yellow card) 8'; Kritikopoulos (yellow card) 23'	Stadium: AEK Stadium; Attendance: 29,807; Referee: Nikos Zlatanos (Thessaloniki)

25 February 1979 21	Iraklis	2–3	AEK Athens	Thessaloniki
15:00 EET (UTC+2)	Hatzipanagis 39'; Gesios 50'		Kotsos (yellow card); Tsamis (yellow card); Ravousis (yellow card); Mavros 26'; Mousouris 44'; Bajević 51'	Stadium: Kaftanzoglio Stadium; Attendance: 14,354; Referee: Manolis Vardakas (Kozani)

4 March 1979 22	AEK Athens	4–0	Panionios	Nea Filadelfeia
15:00 EET (UTC+2)	Bajević 10', 52'; Mavros 31'; Gravanis 41' (o.g.)		Gravanis (yellow card); Pathiakakis (penalty missed) 78'	Stadium: AEK Stadium; Attendance: 13,554; Referee: Giorgos Petropoulos (Athens)

11 March 1979 23	Aris	2–1	AEK Athens	Thessaloniki
15:30 EET (UTC+2)	Pallas 42'; Semertzidis 49'		Bajević 6'	Stadium: Aris Stadium; Attendance: 27,000; Referee: Giorgos Armodoros (Piraeus)

18 March 1979 24	AEK Athens	5–1	Ethnikos Piraeus	Nea Filadelfeia
15:30 EET (UTC+2)	Bajević 16', 62'; Mavros 42'; Nikoloudis 50', 70'		Karaiskos 50'	Stadium: AEK Stadium; Attendance: 17,454; Referee: Panagiotis Tsolakidis (Thessaloniki)

25 March 1979 25	Panachaiki	1–2	AEK Athens	Patras
15:30 EEST (UTC+3)	Davourlis 61'		Nikoloudis 31', 40'; Bajević (red card) 86'	Stadium: Panachaiki Stadium; Attendance: 11,833; Referee: Giannis Petrakis (Heraklion)

1 April 1979 26	Apollon Athens	1–3	AEK Athens	Rizoupoli
16:00 EEST (UTC+3)	Papadimitriou 90' (pen.), (yellow card)		Ardizoglou 20', (yellow card); Mavros 67', 79' (pen.)	Stadium: Rizoupoli Stadium; Attendance: 14,169; Referee: Nikos Fakis (Athens)

8 April 1979 27	AEK Athens	1–0	Panathinaikos	Nea Filadelfeia
16:00 EEST (UTC+3)	Nikoloudis 39', (red card) 41'		Eleftheriadis (yellow card) 41'; Livathinos (red card) 41'; V. Konstantinou (yellow card) 90'	Stadium: AEK Stadium; Attendance: 28,789; Referee: Giorgos Petropoulos (Athens)
Note: A few minutes before the half time, fierce clash broke out between the players, after a foul by Eleftherakis on Mavros. This resulted in the expulsion of Nikoloudis and Livathinos. After the match Álvarez spoke out against Domazos, threatening, while he accused him of spitting him, in which the latter responded the following day accepting the charges and challenging him to a fight.

15 April 1979 28	Kastoria	1–1	AEK Athens	Kastoria
16:00 EEST (UTC+3)	Paunovski 77'		Mousouris 85'	Stadium: Municipal Stadium of Kastoria; Attendance: 3,513; Referee: Giorgos Moschopoulos (Thessaloniki)

25 April 1979 29	AEK Athens	5–2	Rodos	Nea Filadelfeia
16:30 EEST (UTC+3)	Bajević 20'; Mavros 47', 78', (penalty missed) 77'; Papaioannou 71'; Nikolaou 84'		Kottis 37', 61'	Stadium: AEK Stadium; Attendance: 15,001; Referee: Manolis Vardakas (Kozani)

6 May 1979 30	Panserraikos	2–5	AEK Athens	Serres
16:30 EEST (UTC+3)	Tsiolas 25'; Anastasiadis 69'		Mavros 43', 46', 78'; Ardizoglou 44'; Bajević 87'	Stadium: Serres Municipal Stadium; Attendance: 2,716; Referee: Giorgos Katsoras (Thessaloniki)

13 May 1979 31	AEK Athens	2–0	OFI	Nea Filadelfeia
17:00 EEST (UTC+3)	Bajević 2'; Konstantinou 89'			Stadium: AEK Stadium; Attendance: 13,634; Referee: Giorgos Moschopoulos (Thessaloniki)

20 May 1979 32	AEL	0–1	AEK Athens	Larissa
17:00 EEST (UTC+3)	Parafestas (yellow card); Koumarias (yellow card) 45' (yellow-red card) 65'		Nikoloudis 27'	Stadium: Alcazar Stadium; Attendance: 11,731; Referee: Antonis Vassaras (Thessaloniki)

27 May 1979 33	AEK Athens	7–0	Kavala	Nea Filadelfeia
17:00 EEST (UTC+3)	Mousouris (yellow card); Bajević 7', 23'; Mavros 15', 21', 42' (pen.); Konstantinou 58'; Nikoloudis 80'			Stadium: AEK Stadium; Attendance: 10,306; Referee: Grippas

3 June 1979 34	AEK Athens	7–2	PAS Giannina	Nea Filadelfeia
17:15 EEST (UTC+3)	Konstantinou 3', 59'; Bajević 11'; Nikoloudis 26'; Ardizoglou 29'; Domazos 36'; Mavros (penalty missed) 46', 48'		Papachristou 61' (pen.); Seitaridis 67'	Stadium: AEK Stadium; Attendance: 7,244; Referee: Thomaidis (Piraeus)

==== Championship play-off ====
16 June 1979 Play-off match	AEK Athens	2–0 (Awarded)	Olympiacos	Ampelokipoi
20:00 EEST (UTC+3)		Report		Stadium: Leoforos Alexandras Stadium; Attendance: 5,000; Referee: Ioannis Ioannidis (Thessaloniki)
Note: Olympiacos did not show up, so the match, as well as the title, were awarded to AEK Athens.

=== Greek Cup ===
==== Matches ====
8 November 1978 First round	AEK Athens	5–2	Kavala	Nea Filadelfeia
14:00 EET (UTC+2)	Mavros 10', 71', 83' (pen.); Bajević 40', 68', (yellow card) 85'		Machairidis 69'; Filippidis 87'	Stadium: AEK Stadium; Attendance: 2,204; Referee: Thomaidis (Piraeus)

31 January 1979 Second round	AEK Athens	4–0	Proodeftiki	Nea Filadelfeia
15:30 EET (UTC+2)	Bajević 18', 64'; Ravousis 47'; Konstantinou 74'			Stadium: AEK Stadium; Attendance: 6,071; Referee: Stefanos Rammos (Thessaloniki)

21 February 1979 Round of 16	AEK Athens	4–0	Acharnaikos	Nea Filadelfeia
15:30 EET (UTC+2)	Bajević 6', 67'; Papadopoulos 28'; Mavros 56'			Stadium: AEK Stadium; Attendance: 2,546; Referee: Antonis Patrikas (Euboea)

===== Quarter-finals =====
14 March 1979 First leg	Anagennisi Epanomi	1–1	AEK Athens	Thessaloniki
15:30 EET (UTC+2)	Krystallidis (yellow card); Tsilios 82'		Mousouris (yellow card); Viera (yellow card); Nikoloudis 71'	Stadium: Epanomi Municipal Stadium; Attendance: 2,598; Referee: Charalampos Pamporidis (Pella)

18 April 1979 Second leg	AEK Athens	2–0 (3–1 agg.)	Anagennisi Epanomi	Nea Filadelfeia
15:30 EEST (UTC+3)	Mavros 41'; Ravousis (yellow card) 85'; Bajević 87'		Dalis (yellow card) 53'	Stadium: AEK Stadium; Attendance: 6,092; Referee: Nikos Lagogiannis (Piraeus)

===== Semi-finals =====
16 May 1979 First leg	Panachaiki	3–2	AEK Athens	Patras
16:30 EEST (UTC+3)	Spentzopoulos (yellow card); Davourlis (yellow card); Ioakimidis 25'; Georgopoulos 63', 80'		Nikolaou (yellow card); Mavros 3'; Ravousis 75'	Stadium: Panachaiki Stadium; Attendance: 7,956; Referee: Thomaidis (Piraeus)

30 May 1979 Second leg	AEK Athens	5–1 (7–4 agg.)	Panachaiki	Nea Filadelfeia
17:30 EEST (UTC+3)	Nikoloudis 10', 15'; Mavros 35'; Bajević 70', 80'		Davourlis 25', (penalty missed) 83'	Stadium: AEK Stadium; Attendance: 11,703; Referee: Manolis Vardakas (Kozani)

===== Final =====
9 June 1979 Final	Panionios	3–1	AEK Athens	Piraeus
21:00 EEST (UTC+3)	Anastopoulos 51'; Mavrikis (yellow card) 62'; Lima 67'; Pathiakakis 84'	Report	Konstantinou 3', (red card) 71'; Nikolaou (yellow card) 50'	Stadium: Karaiskakis Stadium; Attendance: 20,299; Referee: Nikos Lagogiannis (Piraeus)

=== European Cup ===
==== First round ====
13 September 1978 First leg	AEK Athens (Greece)	6–1	(Portugal) Porto	Athens, Greece
21:00 EEST (UTC+3)	Bajević 3', 20'; Ardizoglou 16'; Konstantinou 39'; Nikolaou 58'; Mavros 60'	Report	Oliveira (yellow card) 45', (goal) 81'; Teixeira (yellow card) 64'	Stadium: AEK Stadium; Attendance: 33,000; Referee: Eldar Azimzade (Soviet Union)
Note: AEK Athens' largest victory in the European Cup.

27 September 1978 Second leg	Porto (Portugal)	4–1 (5–7 agg.)	(Greece) AEK Athens	Porto, Portugal
21:45 EEST (UTC+3)	Berg (yellow card) 43'; Vital 63', 83'; Teixeira 79'; Gomes 88'	Report	Intzoglou (yellow card) 3'; Mavros 32'	Stadium: Estádio das Antas; Attendance: 62,000; Referee: Charles Corver (Netherlands)

==== Second round ====
18 October 1978 First leg	AEK Athens (Greece)	1–2	(England) Nottingham Forest	Athens, Greece
20:30 EEST (UTC+3)	Viera (yellow card) 22' (yellow-red card) 22'; Konstantinou 59' (pen.); Ravousis (yellow card) 62'	Report	McGovern 10'; Burns (yellow card) 22'; Birtles 45'	Stadium: AEK Stadium; Attendance: 35,000; Referee: Robert Wurtz (France)

1 November 1978 Second leg	Nottingham Forest (England)	5–1 (7–2 agg.)	(Greece) AEK Athens	Nottingham, England
20:30 EET (UTC+2)	Needham 12'; Woodcock 35'; Anderson 40'; Birtles 66', 72'	Report	Bajević 50'; Nikolaou (yellow card) 61'	Stadium: City Ground; Attendance: 38,069; Referee: Ulf Eriksson (Sweden)

== Statistics ==
=== Squad statistics ===
As of 16 June 1979

No.	Pos	Player	Alpha Ethniki		Greek Cup		European Cup		Total	
No.	Pos	Player	Apps	Goals	Apps	Goals	Apps	Goals	Apps	Goals
Goalkeepers
—	GK	(Kingdom of Greece) Nikos Christidis	5	0	5	0	2	0	12	0
—	GK	(Kingdom of Greece) Lakis Stergioudas	30	0	3	0	2	0	35	0
Defenders
—	DF	(Kingdom of Greece) Apostolos Toskas	6	0	4	0	1	0	11	0
—	DF	(Kingdom of Greece) Lakis Nikolaou	28	1	6	0	4	1	38	2
—	DF	(Kingdom of Greece) Babis Intzoglou	17	0	3	0	4	0	24	0
—	DF	(Kingdom of Greece) Giannis Mousouris	32	3	5	0	4	0	41	3
—	DF	(Kingdom of Greece) Petros Ravousis	30	0	7	2	4	0	41	2
—	DF	(Kingdom of Greece) Aris Damianidis	7	0	1	0	1	0	9	0
—	DF	(Kingdom of Greece) Dimitris Kotsos	21	0	5	0	0	0	26	0
—	DF	(Kingdom of Greece) Theodoros Apostolopoulos	9	0	7	0	0	0	16	0
Midfielders
—	MF	(Kingdom of Greece) Mimis Domazos	29	5	4	0	2	0	35	5
—	MF	(Uruguay) Milton Viera	8	0	3	0	2	0	13	0
—	MF	(Kingdom of Greece) Lazaros Papadopoulos	9	1	1	1	2	0	12	2
—	MF	(Kingdom of Greece) Takis Nikoloudis	31	12	6	3	4	0	41	15
—	MF	(Kingdom of Greece) Dionysis Tsamis	27	0	5	0	1	0	33	0
—	MF	(Kingdom of Greece) Christos Ardizoglou	29	6	6	0	4	1	39	7
—	MF	(Kingdom of Greece) Giorgos Vlantis	0	0	0	0	0	0	0	0
Forwards
—	FW	(Kingdom of Greece) Mimis Papaioannou	22	2	3	0	0	0	25	2
—	FW	(Socialist Federal Republic of Yugoslavia) Dušan Bajević	29	24	8	9	4	3	41	36
—	FW	(Cyprus) Tasos Konstantinou	25	4	6	2	4	2	35	8
—	FW	(Kingdom of Greece) Thomas Mavros	33	31	6	7	4	2	43	40
—	FW	(Kingdom of Greece) Dimitris Kokkinopoulos	5	0	3	0	0	0	8	0
From Reserve Squad
—	GK	(Kingdom of Greece) Spyros Ikonomopoulos	0	0	0	0	0	0	0	0
—	DF	(Kingdom of Greece) Panagiotis Stylianopoulos	0	0	1	0	0	0	1	0
—	MF	(Kingdom of Greece) Christos Kalaitzidis	1	0	1	0	0	0	2	0

=== Goalscorers ===
As of 16 June 1979
The list is sorted by competition order when total goals are equal, then by position and then alphabetically by surname.

Rank	Pos.	Player	Alpha Ethniki	Greek Cup	European Cup	Total
1	FW	(Greece) Thomas Mavros	31	7	2	40
2	FW	(Socialist Federal Republic of Yugoslavia) Dušan Bajević	24	9	3	36
3	MF	(Greece) Takis Nikoloudis	12	3	0	15
4	FW	(Cyprus) Tasos Konstantinou	4	2	2	8
5	MF	(Greece) Christos Ardizoglou	6	0	1	7
6	MF	(Greece) Mimis Domazos	5	0	0	5
7	DF	(Greece) Giannis Mousouris	3	0	0	3
8	FW	(Greece) Mimis Papaioannou	2	0	0	2
8	MF	(Greece) Lazaros Papadopoulos	1	1	0	2
8	DF	(Greece) Lakis Nikolaou	1	0	1	2
8	DF	(Greece) Petros Ravousis	0	2	0	2
Own goals			1	0	0	1
Totals			90	24	9	123

=== Hat-tricks ===
Numbers in superscript represent the goals that the player scored.

Player	Against	Result	Date	Competition	Source
(Socialist Federal Republic of Yugoslavia) Dušan Bajević	(Greece) Iraklis	5–1 (H)	1 October 1978	Alpha Ethniki	
(Greece) Thomas Mavros	(Greece) Kavala	5–2 (H)	8 November 1978	Greek Cup	
(Socialist Federal Republic of Yugoslavia) Dušan Bajević^{4}	(Greece) Panserraikos	5–0 (H)	31 December 1978	Alpha Ethniki	
(Greece) Thomas Mavros	(Greece) AEL	4–2 (H)	14 January 1979	Alpha Ethniki	
(Greece) Thomas Mavros	(Greece) Egaleo	5–0 (H)	4 February 1979	Alpha Ethniki	
(Greece) Thomas Mavros	(Greece) Panserraikos	5–2 (A)	6 May 1979	Alpha Ethniki	
(Greece) Thomas Mavros	(Greece) Kavala	7–0 (H)	27 May 1979	Alpha Ethniki	

=== Clean sheets ===
As of 16 June 1979
The list is sorted by competition order when total clean sheets are equal and then alphabetically by surname. Clean sheets in games where both goalkeepers participated are awarded to the goalkeeper who started the game. Goalkeepers with no appearances are not included.

Rank	Player	Alpha Ethniki	Greek Cup	European Cup	Total
1	(Greece) Lakis Stergioudas	13	0	0	13
2	(Greece) Nikos Christidis	2	3	0	5
Totals		15	3	0	18

=== Disciplinary record ===
As of 16 June 1979

N	P	Nat.	Name	Alpha Ethniki			Greek Cup			European Cup			Total			Notes
N	P	Nat.	Name	Yellow card	Second yellow card	Red card	Yellow card	Second yellow card	Red card	Yellow card	Second yellow card	Red card	Yellow card	Second yellow card	Red card	Notes
Goalkeepers
—	GK	(Kingdom of Greece)	Nikos Christidis													
—	GK	(Kingdom of Greece)	Lakis Stergioudas	1									1			
Defenders
—	DF	(Kingdom of Greece)	Apostolos Toskas	1									1			
—	DF	(Kingdom of Greece)	Lakis Nikolaou			1	2			1			3		1	
—	DF	(Kingdom of Greece)	Babis Intzoglou							1			1			
—	DF	(Kingdom of Greece)	Giannis Mousouris	2			1						3			
—	DF	(Kingdom of Greece)	Petros Ravousis	7	1		1			1			9	1		
—	DF	(Kingdom of Greece)	Aris Damianidis													
—	DF	(Kingdom of Greece)	Dimitris Kotsos	3									3			
—	DF	(Kingdom of Greece)	Theodoros Apostolopoulos													
Midfielders
—	MF	(Kingdom of Greece)	Mimis Domazos													
—	MF	(Uruguay)	Milton Viera	1			1			2	1		4	1		
—	MF	(Kingdom of Greece)	Lazaros Papadopoulos													
—	MF	(Kingdom of Greece)	Takis Nikoloudis			1									1	
—	MF	(Kingdom of Greece)	Dionysis Tsamis	1									1			
—	MF	(Kingdom of Greece)	Christos Ardizoglou	1									1			
—	MF	(Kingdom of Greece)	Giorgos Vlantis													
Forwards
—	FW	(Kingdom of Greece)	Mimis Papaioannou													
—	FW	(Socialist Federal Republic of Yugoslavia)	Dušan Bajević	2		1	1						3		1	
—	FW	(Cyprus)	Tasos Konstantinou						1						1	
—	FW	(Kingdom of Greece)	Thomas Mavros													
—	FW	(Kingdom of Greece)	Dimitris Kokkinopoulos													
From Reserve Squad
—	GK	(Kingdom of Greece)	Spyros Ikonomopoulos													
—	DF	(Kingdom of Greece)	Panagiotis Stylianopoulos													
—	MF	(Kingdom of Greece)	Christos Kalaitzidis													

=== Starting 11 ===
This section presents the most frequently used formation along with the players with the most starts across all competitions.

N.	Formation	Matchday(s)
40	4–3–3	1–34

Nat.	Player	Pos.
(Greece)	Lakis Stergioudas	GK
(Greece)	Petros Ravousis	RCB
(Greece)	Lakis Nikolaou (C)	LCB
(Greece)	Giannis Mousouris	RB
(Greece)	Christos Ardizoglou	LB
(Greece)	Dionysis Tsamis	DM
(Greece)	Mimis Domazos	RCM
(Greece)	Takis Nikoloudis	LCM
(Cyprus)	Tasos Konstantinou	RW
(Greece)	Thomas Mavros	LW
(Socialist Federal Republic of Yugoslavia)	Dušan Bajević	CF

Last updated: 1979-06-16

== Awards ==
Player	Pos.	Award	Source
(Greece) Thomas Mavros	FW	Alpha Ethniki Top Scorer	
(Socialist Federal Republic of Yugoslavia) Dušan Bajević	FW	Greek Cup Top Scorer	
