= 1979 Greek Football Cup final =

1979 Greek Cup final
- Event: 1978–79 Greek Football Cup
Panionios	AEK Athens
3	1
- Date: 9 June 1979
- Venue: Karaiskakis Stadium, Piraeus
- Referee: Nikos Lagogiannis (Piraeus)
- Attendance: 20,299

The 1979 Greek Cup final was the 35th final of the Greek Cup. The match took place on 9 June 1979 at Karaiskakis Stadium. The contesting teams were Panionios and AEK Athens. It was Panionios' fourth Greek Cup final in their 89 years of existence and AEK Athens' eleventh Greek Cup final and second consecutive in their 55-year history. Panionios with a 3–1 comeback, defeated the champions of that year, AEK Athens, claiming their first Cup and completed one of the biggest surprises in the history of the institution.

== Venue ==
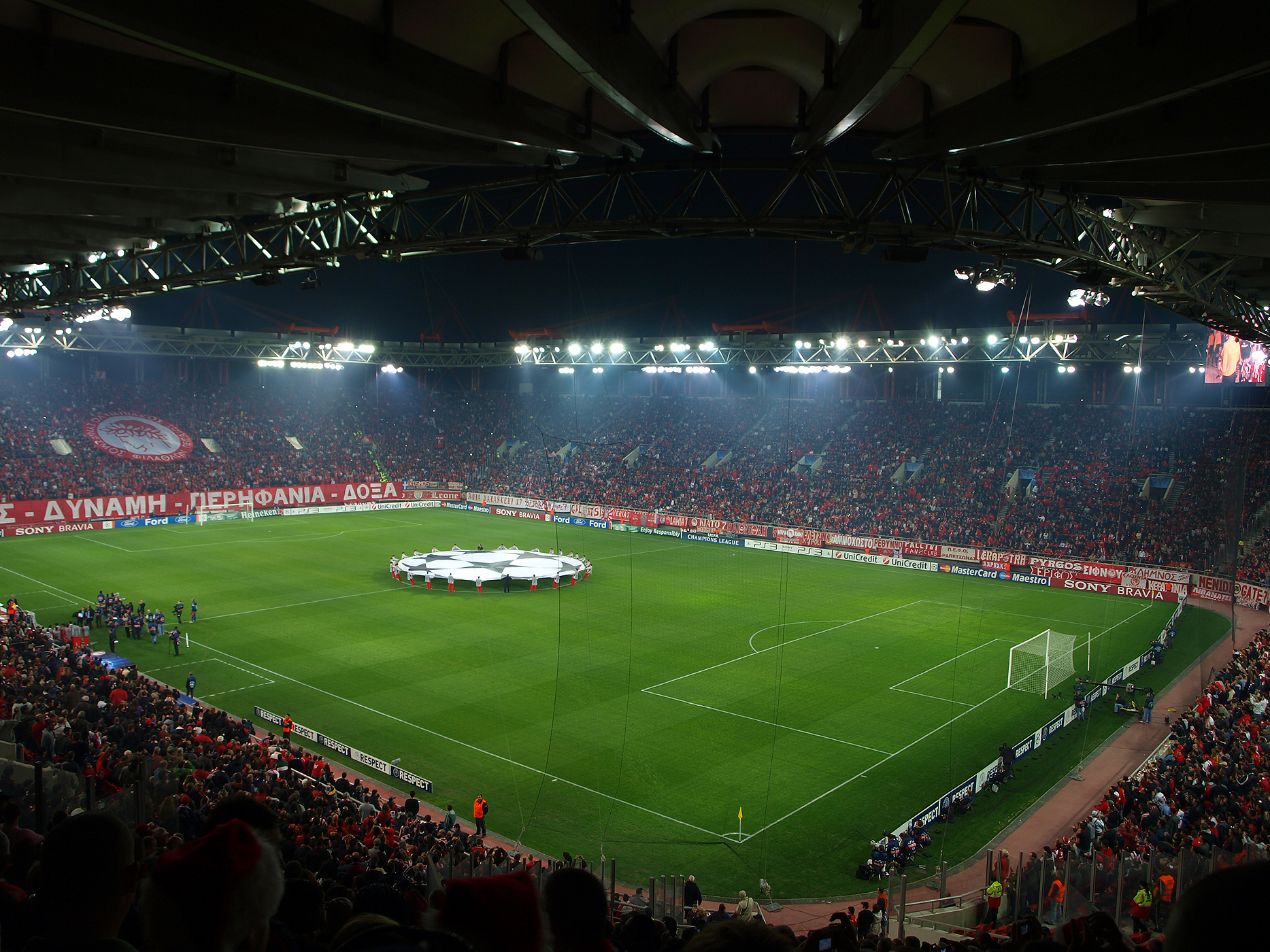
Karaiskakis Stadium.

This was the eleventh Greek Cup final held at Karaiskakis Stadium, after the 1957, 1958, 1965, 1969, 1971, 1972, 1973, 1975, 1977 and 1978 finals. (Karaiskakis also hosted the replay match of the 1960 final between Panathinaikos and Olympiacos).

Karaiskakis Stadium was built in 1895 and renovated once in 1964. The stadium is used as a venue for Olympiacos and Ethnikos Piraeus and was used for Greece on various occasions. Its current capacity is 42,000 and hosted a European Cup Winners' Cup final in 1971 and the first leg of the Intercontinental Cup final in 1971.

== Background ==
Panionios had reached the Greek Cup final three times. The last time that they played in a final was in 1967, where they had lost to Panathinaikos by 1–0.

AEK Athens had reached the Greek Cup final ten times, winning six of them. The last time that they played in a final was in 1978, where they had won against PAOK by 2–0.

The two teams had never met each other in a Cup final.

== Route to the final ==
Panionios				Round	AEK Athens			
Opponent	Agg.	1st leg	2nd leg		Opponent	Agg.	1st leg	2nd leg
Olympiakos Loutraki	3–1 (H)			First round	Kavala	5–2 (H)		
Edessaikos	3–2 (a.e.t.) (H)			Second round	Proodeftiki	4–0 (H)		
Almopos Aridea	1–0 (H)			Round of 16	Acharnaikos	4–0 (H)		
Aris	7–6	2–5 (A)	5–1 (H)	Quarter-finals	Anagennisi Epanomi	3–1	1–1 (A)	2–0 (H)
Olympiacos	4–4 (a)	2–1 (H)	3–2 (A)	Semi-finals	Panachaiki	7–4	2–3 (A)	5–1 (H)

== Match ==
=== Details ===
9 June 1979
21:00 EEST

Panionios	3–1	AEK Athens
Anastopoulos 51'; Lima 67'; Pathiakakis 84'	Report	Konstantinou 3'

Karaiskakis Stadium, Piraeus
Attendance: 20,299
Referee: Nikos Lagogiannis (Piraeus)

Panionios	AEK Athens

GK	1	(Greece) Zafeiris Kakkaris
DF		(Greece) Serafim Zacharopoulos
DF		(Greece) Giannis Gravanis
DF		(Greece) Nikos Chalkidis
DF		(Greece) Christos Emvoliadis
MF		(Greece) Charampos Saipas		(substituted off) 46'
MF		(Cape Verde) Noni Lima
MF	10	(Greece) Giannis Pathiakakis
FW		(Greece) Dimitris Mavrikis (c)	(yellow card) 62'
FW		(Greece) Nikos Anastopoulos
FW		(Greece) Vasilis Vallidis
Substitute:
GK	15	(Greece) Kyriakidis
DF		(Greece) Giorgos Kalogeropoulos
MF		(Greece) Vasilis Moraitelis		(substituted on) 46'
MF		(Peru) Santiago Ojeda
FW		(Greece) Thomas Liolios
FW		(Greece) Dimitris Saravakos
Manager:
(Greece) Panos Markovic

GK	1	(Greece) Lakis Stergioudas
DF	2	(Greece) Giannis Mousouris
DF	4	(Greece) Petros Ravousis
DF	5	(Greece) Lakis Nikolaou (c)	(yellow card) 50'
DF	3	(Greece) Christos Ardizoglou		(substituted off) 46'
MF	6	(Greece) Dionysis Tsamis
MF	8	(Greece) Takis Nikoloudis
MF	10	(Greece) Mimis Domazos
FW	7	(Cyprus) Tasos Konstantinou	(red card) 72'
FW	9	(Socialist Federal Republic of Yugoslavia) Dušan Bajević
FW	11	(Greece) Thomas Mavros
Substitute:
GK	15	(Greece) Nikos Christidis
DF	13	(Greece) Theodoros Apostolopoulos		(substituted on) 46'
DF		(Greece) Apostolos Toskas
DF		(Greece) Panagiotis Stylianopoulos
MF		(Greece) Christos Kalaitzidis
MF		(Greece) Dimitris Kokkinopoulos
Manager:
(Greece) Andreas Stamatiadis

Assistant referees:
Nikos Zlatanos (Thessaloniki)
Giannis Latsios (Larissa)

Match rules

- 90 minutes
- 30 minutes of extra time if necessary
- Penalty shootout if scores still level
- Five named substitutes
- Maximum of two substitutions

== See also ==
- 1978–79 Greek Football Cup
