= Elvio =

Elvio is a given name. Notable people with the name include:

- Elvio Banchero (1904–1982), Italian football player
- Élvio (footballer), Élvio Donizete Ezequiel (born 1956), Brazilian football player
- Elvio Jiménez (born 1940), Dominican baseball player
- Elvio Martínez (born 1982), Argentine football player
- Elvio van Overbeek (born 1994), Angolan-born Dutch football player
- Elvio Mana (born 1955), Argentine football player
- Elvio Porcel de Peralta, Argentine football player
- Elvio Porta (athlete) (born 1921), Argentine discus and hammer thrower
- Elvio Porta (1945–2016), Italian actor
- Elvio Romero (1926–2004), Paraguayan poet
- Elvio Sadun (1918–1974), Italian-born American parasitologist
- Elvio Salvori (born 1944), Italian football player
