= Estadio =

es:Estadio is the spanish language word for Stadium. The term may be applied to the following:

- Estadio (magazine) a sports magazine published in Chile
- Specific stadiums in Spanish speaking or Portuguese speaking countries, click here for a full search
