= Konstantinos Lima =

Greek footballer

Personal information
- Date of birth: 13 November 1993 (age 33)
- Place of birth: Atsiki, Lemnos, Greece
- Height: 1.82 m (6 ft 0 in)
- Position: Defender

Team information
- Current team: Asteras Pastida

Youth career
- –2009: Panionios
- 2009–2012: Kalloni

Senior career*
Years	Team	Apps	(Gls)
2012–2013	Kalloni	4	(0)
2014	Pannaxiakos	14	(2)
2015	Aiolikos		
2016	Niki Volos	3	(0)
2017–2018	AO Karavas	19	(0)
2018–2019	AE Lefkimmi		
2019–2021	Episkopi	17	(1)
2021	AO Ypato	9	(2)
2022	Episkopi	0	(0)
2022	Paniliakos	5	(1)
2023	Panionios	19	(2)
2023–2024	Episkopi		
2024	Rodos		
2024–2026	Apollon Kalythies		
2026–	Asteras Pastida		
- * Club domestic league appearances and goals as of 14 August 2022

Konstantinos Lima (Greek: Κωνσταντίνος Λίμα; born 13 November 1993) is a Greek professional footballer who plays as a defender for Asteras Pastida.

== Club career ==
Lima started his career with Greek second division side Kalloni, where he made four appearances. On 30 June 2012, he debuted for Kalloni during a 4–0 win over Panachaiki. Before the second half of 2013–14, Lima signed for Pannaxiakos in the Greek third division.

== International career ==
Lima is eligible to represent Cape Verde internationally through his father, former footballer Noni Lima.
