= Michalis Tzorbatzakis =

Greek footballer

Personal information
- Full name: Michalis Tzorbatzakis
- Date of birth: 2 July 1982 (age 44)
- Place of birth: Greece
- Height: 1.80 m (5 ft 11 in)
- Position: Defender

Team information
- Current team: P.O. Elassona

Senior career*
Years	Team	Apps	(Gls)
2002–2003	Ergotelis	21	
2003–2004	Irodotos		
2004–2005	Kallithea	22	
2005–2006	→ Niki Volos (loan)	12	
2006–2008	Kallithea	58	(1)
2008–2009	Levadiakos	14	
2009–2010	→ Ethnikos Asteras (loan)	11	
2010	Levadiakos	1	
2010–2011	Kallithea		
2011	Levadiakos	15	(0)
2011–2012	A.O. Glyfada	1	(0)
2013	Pannaxiakos		
2014–	P.O. Elassona		
- * Club domestic league appearances and goals as of 5 October 2010

Michalis Tzorbatzakis (Greek: Μιχάλης Τζορμπατζάκης; born 2 July 1982) is a Greek former footballer who played as a defender.

Tzormbatzakis began his professional football career by signing with Ergotelis in July 2002.
