= Elvio Porcel de Peralta =

Argentine footballer (1938–2000)

- On the cover of Estadio, 1968

Personal information
- Full name: Elvio Ricardo Porcel de Peralta Arnaldo
- Date of birth: 12 July 1938
- Place of birth: Villa María, Argentina
- Date of death: 9 April 2000 (aged 61)
- Place of death: Talca, Chile
- Height: 1.76 m (5 ft 9 in)
- Position: Attacking midfielder

Youth career
- Unión Central

Senior career*
Years	Team	Apps	(Gls)
1954–1958	Tigre		
1959	Vélez Sarsfield		
1960–1961	Tigre		
1962–1967	Rangers		
1968–1969	Santiago Wanderers		
1970	Unión La Calera		
- * Club domestic league appearances and goals

Elvio Ricardo Porcel de Peralta Arnaldo (12 July 1938 – 9 April 2000) was an Argentine and naturalized Chilean footballer who played as an attacking midfielder. Nicknamed El duro entre los duros ('the toughest among the toughest'), he was known for his temper and received a record 97 red cards in his career.

== Career ==
Porcel de Peralta was born on 12 July 1938 in Villa María, Argentina. He was the son of a railway official and played football as a youth for the Argentine club Unión Central starting at age 11. He had wished to study medicine, but gave up that goal when he received an offer at age 16 to join Club Atlético Tigre, of the Primera División, in 1954. He played for Tigre from 1954 to 1958, left for Vélez Sarsfield in 1959, and then returned to Tigre from 1960 to 1961.

Porcel de Peralta left Argentina to join the Chilean side Rangers de Talca at the suggestion of Vicente Cantatore in April 1962. He was moved to midfielder, a position he had played at the start of his career, after having been a forward in the later years of his tenure with Tigre. He played with the Rangers for six years, from 1962 to 1967, and was one of their top players.

Porcel de Peralta was granted Chilean citizenship in 1968. In the same year, he was noticed by José Pérez Figueiras, the manager of the Santiago Wanderers, and signed to play with them. He played two seasons with the team and was a key member of the 1968 team, known as Los Panzers, which won the 1968 Primera División de Chile championship and competed at the 1969 Copa Libertadores.

Porcel de Peralta was praised for what was noted to be his "strength, grit, temperament and pride" with the Wanderers. He was nicknamed El duro entre los duros – literally 'the toughest among the toughest'. Journalist Antonino Vera, in the magazine Estadio, commented:

A few weeks ago we described Elvio Porcel de Peralta as a "modern player". During last year's tournament he was a fundamental factor for the Wanderers' campaign; he was one of the pillars on which the entire, solid structure of the champion was affirmed. He communicated to them his own physical and football solidity. A "strength" player, yes, but also a skilled ball dominator, possessor of a clear, general sense of football, with what they call panoramic vision of the field, and that in his case is very broad. Porcel de Peralta dominates the midfield ... carries the ball well, gets to the attack well and gets down quickly to the defense. He sees the openings for the shot and shoots with power ... he looks very complete.

Porcel de Peralta moved to Unión La Calera in 1970. Although considered a talented player, he was noted for having a reputation of being "explosive, temperamental and sometimes intemperate". He was sent off in a record total of 97 matches in his career. His last sending off resulted in the end of his career. Against Club Universidad de Chile, Porcel de Peralta was kicked by Manuel Rodríguez Vega and "went for revenge". He "ran the entire field" chasing after Rodríguez Vega, who escaped. In response, referee Juan Carvajal showed a red card to Porcel de Peralta, who thought it unjustified and knocked Carvajal down with a punch. As a result, Porcel de Peralta received a lifetime ban from the sport by the Asociación Central de Fútbol (ACF). He made several appeals in court and ultimately won a million-dollar settlement, although he never played professionally again.

== Later life and death ==
Porcel de Peralta settled in Villa Alemana in Chile after his playing career. He owned a restaurant by the name "Donde Porcel". He was married and had three children. Porcel de Peralta died on 9 April 2000 in Talca, of cardiac arrest, at the age of 61.

== Honours ==
Santiago Wanderers

- Chilean Primera División: 1968
