= Pannaxiakos F.C. =

Greek football club

Pannaxiakos
- Full name: Pannaxiakos Athlitikos Omilos
- Founded: 1960; 66 years ago
- Ground: Naxos Municipal Stadium
- Capacity: 1,200
- Chairman: Kostas Apidopoulos
- Manager: Kostas Frantzeskos
- League: Gamma Ethniki
- 2025–26: Cyclades FCA First Division, 1st (promoted)
- Website: https://www.pannaxiakosac.gr/
Home colours	Away colours	Third colours

Pannaxiakos Football Club (Greek: Πανναξιακός Α.Ο.) is a Greek football club, based in Naxos City, Cyclades.

The club was founded in 1959/60.

== Notable former players ==
- (Greece) Christos Arianoutsos
- (Greece) Pantelis Athanasiou
- (Greece) Ilias Chouzouris
- (Romania) Dan Ignat
- (Greece) Giorgos Karousis
- (Greece) Giorgos Katsanis
- (Greece) Nikos Katsanis
- (Greece) Dimitris Keramiotis
- (Albania) (Greece) Giannis Kontis
- (Greece) Giannis Kostopoulos
- (Greece) (France) Andreas Koutelieris
- (Greece) Giannis Koutros
- (Greece) Konstantinos Lima
- (Greece) Kostas Manolas
- (Albania) (Greece) Orestis Menka
- (Greece) Konstantinos Papastathopoulos
- (Portugal) Osvaldo De Ceita Pinto Jalo
- (Greece) Christos Rovas
- (Greece) Vasilios Rovas
- (Greece) Dimitris Siovas
- (Greece) Kostas Skoupras
- (Greece) Lefteris Sousounis
- (Greece) Nikos Stamos
- (Greece) Asterios Themelis
- (Greece) Grigoris Toskas
- (Greece) Vasilis Tsouris
- (Greece) Michalis Tzormbatzakis
- (Greece) Nikos Voulgaris

== Notable former managers ==
- (Greece) Kostas Frantzeskos
- (Cape Verde) (Greece) Noni Lima
- (Bosnia and Herzegovina) Jovan Mihajlović
- (Greece) Dimitris Papaspyrou
- (Greece) Christos Pelekis
- (Greece) Giorgos Probonas
- (Greece) Dimitris Skounas
- (Greece) Nikos Spais
- (Greece) Dimitrios Terezopoulos
- (Greece) Giorgos Vlastos

== Honours ==
=== Domestic Titles and honours ===
  - Cyclades FCA Champions: 8
    - 1982–83, 1992–93, 1998–99, 2002–03, 2010–11, 2014–15, 2019–20, 2025–26
  - Cyclades FCA Cup Winners: 7
    - 1986–87, 2003–04, 2006–07, 2011–12, 2012–13, 2014–15, 2025–26

== See also ==
- Pannaxiakos V.C.
