= Ioannis Kontis =

Greek-Albanian footballer

Albi Kondi
Personal information
- Date of birth: 4 January 1989 (age 37)
- Place of birth: Gjirokastër, Albania
- Height: 1.79 m (5 ft 10 in)
- Position: Striker

Team information
- Current team: Pannaxiakos

Youth career
- Pannaxiakos
- Panionios

Senior career*
Years	Team	Apps	(Gls)
2007–2010	Panionios	17	(0)
2007–2008	→ Chaidari (loan)	8	(0)
2008–2009	→ Apollon Kalamarias (loan)	7	(1)
2010	Rodos	13	(0)
2010–2012	Zakynthos	40	(1)
2012–2013	Glyfada	17	(1)
2013	Fostiras	10	(0)
2014	Kissamikos	0	(0)
2014–2015	Glyfada	0	(0)
2015–2016	Triglia Rafina	0	(0)
2016–2017	Atlantis Anthoussa	0	(0)
2017–2018	Asteras Vlachioti	0	(0)
2018–2020	Panthiraikos	0	(0)
2020-	Pannaxiakos	0	(0)

International career^{‡}
2007	Greece U-19	2	(0)
- * Club domestic league appearances and goals as of 21 June 2008 ‡ National team caps and goals as of 21 June 2008

Ioannis "Giannis" Kontis (Greek: Ιωάννης Κόντης born Albi Kondi , 4 January 1989) is a footballer who plays for Pannaxiakos as striker. Born in Albania, he represented Greece at youth level.
