= Konstantinos Skoupras =

Greek footballer

Personal information
- Full name: Konstantinos Skoupras
- Date of birth: 16 April 1988 (age 38)
- Place of birth: Ersekë, Albania
- Height: 1.81 m (5 ft 11 1/2 in)
- Position: Right back

Team information
- Current team: Apollon Larissa

Youth career
- –2004: Niki Tirnavou
- 2004–2005: Tyrnavos

Senior career*
Years	Team	Apps	(Gls)
2005–2012	Tyrnavos	48	(0)
2012–2013	AEL	1	(0)
2013–2014	Tyrnavos	23	(0)
2014–2015	Trikala	27	(0)
2015–2016	Pannaxiakos	10	(5)
2016	Apollon Larissa	11	(6)
2016–2017	Pannaxiakos	8	(4)
2017–2022	Apollon Larissa	120	(4)
2022–2023	Pannaxiakos	7	(4)
2023	→Hellas Syros (loan)	7	(1)
2023	Almyros		
2024	Anthoupoli		
2024-2025	Trikala		
2025-	Apollon Larissa		
- * Club domestic league appearances and goals as of 1 May 2022

Konstantinos Skoupras (Greek: Κωνσταντίνος Σκούπρας; born 16 April 1988) is a Greek professional footballer who plays as a right back for Apollon Larissa.

== Club career ==
Skoupras started playing as an amateur in Niki Tyrnavou and then signed for Tyrnavos in 2009. After a year playing with the team's youth squad, he was promoted to the first team on 23 August 2010, having signed a five-year contract. He made 48 appearances in two seasons in the Greek Football League 2 (third national division).On 17 of July 2012 he signed a four-year contract with AEL.
