= Christos Arianoutsos =

Greek footballer (born 1993)

Personal information
- Full name: Christos Panagiotis Arianoutsos
- Date of birth: 25 May 1993 (age 33)
- Place of birth: Paros, Greece
- Height: 1.83 m (6 ft 0 in)
- Position: Attacking midfielder

Team information
- Current team: A.E. Parou

Youth career
- 1998–2008: Marpissaikos F.C. Paros
- 2008–2011: Olympiacos F.C.

Senior career*
| Years | Team | Apps | (Gls) |
| 2011–2012 | PO Elassona | 18 | (1) |
| 2012–2014 | Pannaxiakos | 33 | (5) |
| 2014–2015 | Kallithea | 8 | (0) |
| 2015–2016 | Atromitos Piraeus | 20 | (2) |
| 2016–2017 | Proodeftiki | 8 | (0) |
| 2018 | SV Morlautern | 4 | (0) |
| 2018–2019 | Marpissaikos F.C. Paros | | |
| 2019-2020 | Asteras Marmàron | 7 | (5) |
| 2020- | A.E. Parou | 17 | (10) |

International career
| 2009–2010 | Greece U-17 | 5 | (0) |
- * Club domestic league appearances and goals as of 18:00, 21 December 2014 (UTC)

Christos Arianoutsos (Greek: Χρήστος Αριανούτσος, born 25 May 1993) is a Greek footballer who plays for A.E. Parou as a midfielder.

== Club career ==
At the age of 15 Christos Arianoutsos was discovered by Olympiacos scouters and he was signed by the club where he spent 3 years. He started his professional career in 2011 when he was signed by his former youth manager Alekos Alexandris to play for PO Elassona in the Greek Delta Ethniki. The next two seasons found him play for Pannaxiakos in Football League 2. After 2 full seasons in Naxos he made a bigger step in his career signing for Kallithea to play in the Football League.

== International career ==
Arianoutsos was a regular player of the Greek national youth sides. He captained Greece U-17 in the 2010 UEFA European Under-17 Championship.
