= Orestis Menka =

Albanian footballer

Personal information
- Full name: Orestis Menka
- Date of birth: 27 July 1992 (age 34)
- Place of birth: Lushnjë, Albania
- Height: 1.85 m (6 ft 1 in)
- Position: Goalkeeper

Team information
- Current team: Pannaxiakos
- Number: 1

Youth career
- 2002–2007: Levadiakos
- 2007–2009: PAOK
- 2009–2013: Doxa Drama
- 2011–2012: → Glyfada (loan)

Senior career*
Years	Team	Apps	(Gls)
2013–2014	Doxa Drama	8	(0)
2014–2015	Aiginiakos	2	(0)
2015–2016	Doxa Drama	0	(0)
2016–2017	Apollon Kalamaria	13	(0)
2017–2020	Doxa Drama	59	(0)
2020–2021	Panachaiki	0	(0)
2021	Levadiakos	5	(0)
2021	Akropolis	14	(0)
2022–2024	Vasalund	48	(0)
2024–2025	Pierikos		
2025	Zakynthos		
2026–	Pannaxiakos	6	(0)

International career^{‡}
2013	Albania U21	3	(0)
- * Club domestic league appearances and goals as of 29 November 2023 ‡ National team caps and goals as of 11 June 2013

Orestis Menka (born 27 July 1992) is an Albanian professional footballer who plays as a goalkeeper for Greek club Pannaxiakos.

== Club career ==
=== Early career ===
Menka moved to Levadeia, Greece, at the age of four and started his youth career at age 10, with the city's football-club Levadiakos, where he stayed five years before signing with PAOK together with a fellow Albanian compatriot Ergys Kaçe, where he stayed two years, then moved to Doxa Drama's youth team, was loaned for a year at Glyfada F.C. and then returned to Doxa Drama.

=== Doxa Drama ===
On 6 January 2013, Menka gained entry with the first team of Doxa Drama as he called up for the match against Panachaiki, but he was an unused substitute. He called up in total of 7 times, but all of them was an unused substitute.

He made it his debut on 15 December 2013, by being included in the starting line-up in an away match against Anagennisi Giannitsa F.C. finished in the victory 1–2. He played 2 consecutive games by keeping the clean sheet, on 12 January 2014 against Anagennisi Karditsas and against Tyrnavos 05 on 19 January 2014, with both games finishing in goalless draws. Menka played a half-time match on 29 March 2014 against Vataniakos, match finished in the victory 2–3 where he conceded 1 goal as the 2nd was conceded by his substitute Kostas Davkos.

=== PANACHAIKI ===
Since the summer of 2020, he has been playing for Panachaiki.

== International career ==
He played his first match for Albania national under-21 football team on 6 February 2013 against Macedonia U21, a friendly match finished in goalless draw 0-0. In the 2015 UEFA European Under-21 Football Championship he played two matches against Hungary U21 on 7 June 2013 and Bosnia and Herzegovina U21 on 11 June 2013.

== International games and goals ==
=== Youth national team ===
International appearances and goals
#	Date	Venue	Opponent	Final score	Goal	Result	Competition
2013
1	6 February	Stadiumi Laçi, Laçi, Albania	Macedonia	0–0	0	Draw	Friendly
2	7 June	Niko Dovana Stadium, Durrës, Albania	Hungary	1–2	0	Loss	UEFA Euro U-21 2015 qualification
3	11 June	Bilino Polje, Zenica, Bosnia and Herzegovina	Bosnia and Herzegovina	1–4	0	Loss	UEFA Euro U-21 2015 qualification

== Career statistics ==
=== Club ===
As of 19 October 2014

Season	Club	League country	League		League Cup		Europe		Total	
Season	Club	League country	Apps	Goals	Apps	Goals	Apps	Goals	Apps	Goals
2012–13	Doxa Drama	Football League (Greece)	0	0	0	0	-	-	0	0
2013–14	Doxa Drama	Football League (Greece)	8	0	0	0	-	-	8	0
Total			8	0	0	0	0	0	8	0
2014–15	Aiginiakos	Football League (Greece)	0	0	1	0	-	-	1	0
Total			0	0	1	0	0	0	1	0
Career total			8	0	1	0	0	0	9	0
