= Zafeiris Kakkaris =

Greek footballer (born 1951)

Personal information
- Date of birth: 18 September 1951 (age 75)
- Place of birth: Piraeus, Greece
- Height: 1.86 m (6 ft 1 in)
- Position: Goalkeeper

Senior career*
Years	Team	Apps	(Gls)
–1971	Argonautis Piraeus		
1971–1982	Panionios	171	(0)
1982–1983	Aiolikos	24	(0)
1983–1984	Panionios	18	(0)
1984–1985	Levadiakos	28	(0)
1985–1987	Aiolikos	37	(0)
1987–1988	Fostiras		
Total		278	(0)

International career
1969	Greece U19	1	(0)
1972	Greece U21	1	(0)
1977–1978	Greece	6	(0)
- * Club domestic league appearances and goals

Zafeiris Kakkaris (Greek: Ζαφείρης Κάκκαρης; born 18 September 1951) is a Greek former professional footballer who played as a goalkeeper. He played 18 games for Panionios in the 1983–84 Alpha Ethniki.

== Honours ==
- Greek Football Cup: 1978–79
