= Élvio (footballer) =

Brazilian footballer

Personal information
- Full name: Élvio Donizete Ezequiel
- Date of birth: 28 March 1956 (age 70)
- Place of birth: São Carlos, Brazil
- Position: Midfielder

Youth career
- –1976: Sãocarlense

Senior career*
Years	Team	Apps	(Gls)
1976–1977	Sãocarlense		
1978	Jaboticabal		
1979	Rio Claro		
1980	Inter de Limeira		
1980–1981	São Paulo	41	(2)
1982	Santa Cruz		
1982	Taubaté		
1983	Coritiba		
1983	Botafogo-SP		
1984	Coritiba		
1985–1986	Inter de Limeira		
1986	Uberaba		
1987	Taquaritinga		
1988	Sãocarlense		
1989	Platinense-PR		
1989–1990	Londrina		
1990	Operário Ferroviário		
1991	Araçatuba		
1992	Mirassol		

Managerial career
- Palmeirinha
- * Club domestic league appearances and goals as of 9 November 2023

Élvio Donizete Ezequiel (born 28 March 1956), simply known as Élvio, is a Brazilian former professional footballer who played as a midfielder.

== Career ==
Born in São Carlos, he began his career at GE Sãocarlense. He was state champion for São Paulo, Santa Cruz and Coritiba, in addition to making history at Inter de Limeira, the first champion from outside the cities of São Paulo and Santos in the Campeonato Paulista. He was also coach of Palmeirinha de Porto Ferreira, and currently owns a drinks warehouse.

== Honours ==
São Paulo

- Campeonato Paulista: 1981

Santa Cruz

- Campeonato Pernambucano: 1982

Coritiba

- Campeonato Paranaense: 1984

Inter de Limeira

- Campeonato Paulista: 1986

Araçatuba

- Campeonato Paulista Série A2: 1991
