= Giannis Gravanis =

Greek footballer

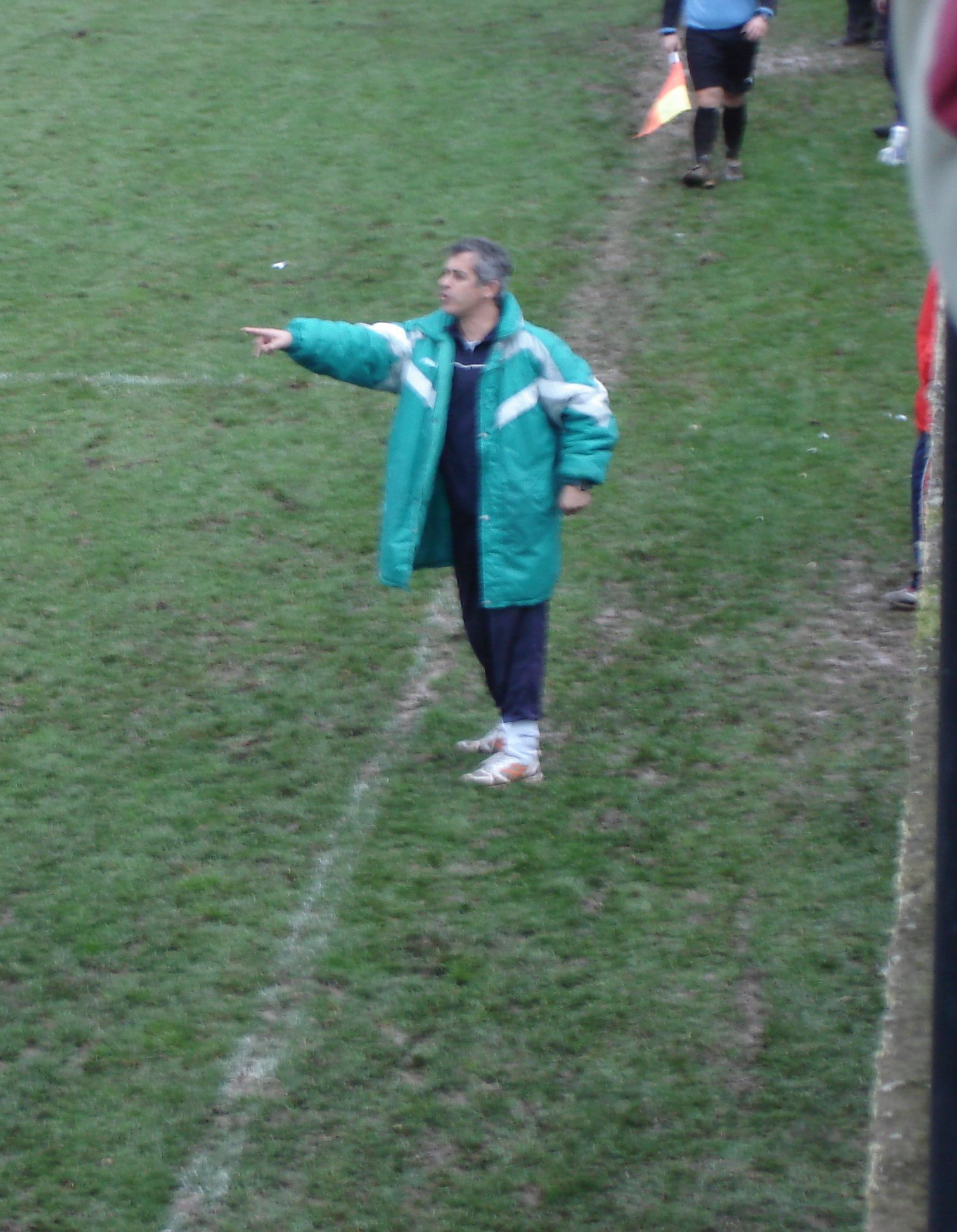

Personal information
- Full name: Ioannis Gravanis
- Date of birth: 16 January 1958
- Place of birth: Domokos, Greece
- Date of death: 30 April 2012 (aged 54)
- Place of death: Patras, Greece
- Height: 1.74 m (5 ft 9 in)
- Position: Defender

Senior career*
| Years | Team | Apps | (Gls) |
| –1977 | Achilleas Domokos F.C. | | |
| 1977–1988 | Panionios | 269 | (14) |
| 1988–1989 | Panachaiki | 6 | (0) |
| 1989 | Patras | | |

International career
| 1982 | Greece | 3 | (0) |
- * Club domestic league appearances and goals

Giannis Gravanis (Greek: Γιάννης Γραβάνης; 16 January 1958 – 30 April 2012) was a Greek footballer.

== Career ==
Born in Domokos, Gravanis began playing football with local side Achilles Domokos. Gravanis joined Panionios in July 1977, and played eleven seasons for the club in the Alpha Ethniki, appearing in 269 league matches. He made his Alpha Ethniki debut on 10 January 1978, and helped Panionios win the 1978–79 Greek Cup final against AEK Athens F.C.

Gravanis made three appearances for the Greece national football team during 1982.

== Personal ==
Gravanis died in a Patras hospital at age 54.
