= Georgios Ioakimidis =

Greek footballer

Personal information
- Date of birth: 25 July 1953
- Place of birth: Patras, Greece
- Date of death: 22 August 2017 (aged 64)
- Position: Midfielder

Senior career*
Years	Team	Apps	(Gls)
1971–1980	Panachaiki		
1980–1988	Ethnikos Piraeus		
1988–1990	Korinthos		
1990–1991	Mesolongiou		
1991–1992	Ethnikos Piraeus		

Managerial career
- 1998: Ethnikos Piraeus
- 2002: Panegialios
- 2003–2004: Vyzas
- * Club domestic league appearances and goals

Georgios Ioakimidis (Greek: Γεώργιος Ιωακειμίδης; 25 July 1953 – 22 August 2017) was a Greek football midfielder and later manager.
