= Elvio Martínez =

Argentine footballer

Personal information
- Full name: Elvio Raúl Martínez
- Date of birth: May 1, 1982 (age 44)
- Place of birth: Rosario, Argentina
- Height: 1.79 m (5 ft 10 1/2 in)
- Position: Attacking midfielder

Senior career*
Years	Team	Apps	(Gls)
2001–2003	Newell's Old Boys	36	(3)
2003–2004	→ Nueva Chicago (loan)	32	(2)
2004–2005	→ Talleres Córdoba (loan)	28	(0)
2005–2009	Aldosivi	103	(15)
2008	→ Politehnica Timișoara (loan)	8	(2)
2010	San Martín Tucumán	10	(0)
2010–2011	Tiro Federal	12	(0)
2011	Boca Unidos	10	(0)
2011–2013	Juventud Antoniana	27	(1)
2013–2014	C.A.I.	47	(7)
2014–2015	Gimnasia y Esgrima	39	(4)
2016	Atlético Uruguay	12	(0)
Total		364	(34)
- * Club domestic league appearances and goals as of 27 March 2018

Elvio Raúl Martínez (born May 1, 1982, in Rosario) is an Argentine former football midfielder. In 2008 he had his only experience outside Argentina playing in Romania for Liga I club Politehnica Timișoara.
