= Dimitris Kotsos =

Greek footballer (born 1955)

Personal information
- Full name: Dimitrios Kotsos
- Date of birth: 30 March 1955 (age 71)
- Place of birth: Greece
- Position: Left-back

Youth career
- –1974: Panathinaikos

Senior career*
Years	Team	Apps	(Gls)
1974–1977	Panathinaikos	7	(0)
1975–1976	→ Atromitos (loan)	29	(0)
1977–1978	Kastoria	9	(0)
1978–1980	AEK Athens	21	(0)
Total		66	(0)
- * Club domestic league appearances and goals

Dimitris Kotsos (Greek: Δημήτρης Κώτσος; born 30 March 1955) is a Greek former professional football player who played as a left-back.

== Club career ==
Kotsos joined the academy of Panathinaikos at a young age. In 1974, at the age of 18, he was promoted to the senior team, where he played as a left back. He was highly regarded by the manager, Ferenc Puskás, but when the latter left the club, Kotsos was sidelined. On 18 June 1975, he played as a starter in the Cup final at Karaiskakis Stadium, where Panathinaikos lost 1–0 to Olympiacos. As a result of being sidelined, Kotsos was loaned to Atromitos in the summer of 1975, where he spent a season as a regular. Due to his performances, he returned to Panathinaikos in the summer of 1976, where despite not getting many opportunities in the main squad, he won the domestic double.

In the summer of 1977, Kotsos was transferred to Kastoria, where he played for one year. On 14 July 1978, he moved to AEK Athens, following the appointment of Ferenc Puskás as the club's manager. In his first season at the club he was among the main players of the squad, as the club won the league, while also reaching the Cup final, losing to Panionios. In the following season, the arrival of the manager Hermann Stessl at the club resulted in him being sidelined, while a series of injuries, culminating in the spinal surgery he underwent put him out of action for at least two months. Upon his return, he remained sidelined, while the footballer felt that AEK did not treat him as he should have. Thus, on 31 July 1980, he was released from the club.

== Honours ==
Panathinaikos

- Alpha Ethniki: 1976–77
- Greek Cup: 1976–77

AEK Athens

- Alpha Ethniki: 1978–79
