= Stavros Papadopoulos =

Cypriot footballer and manager (born 1953)

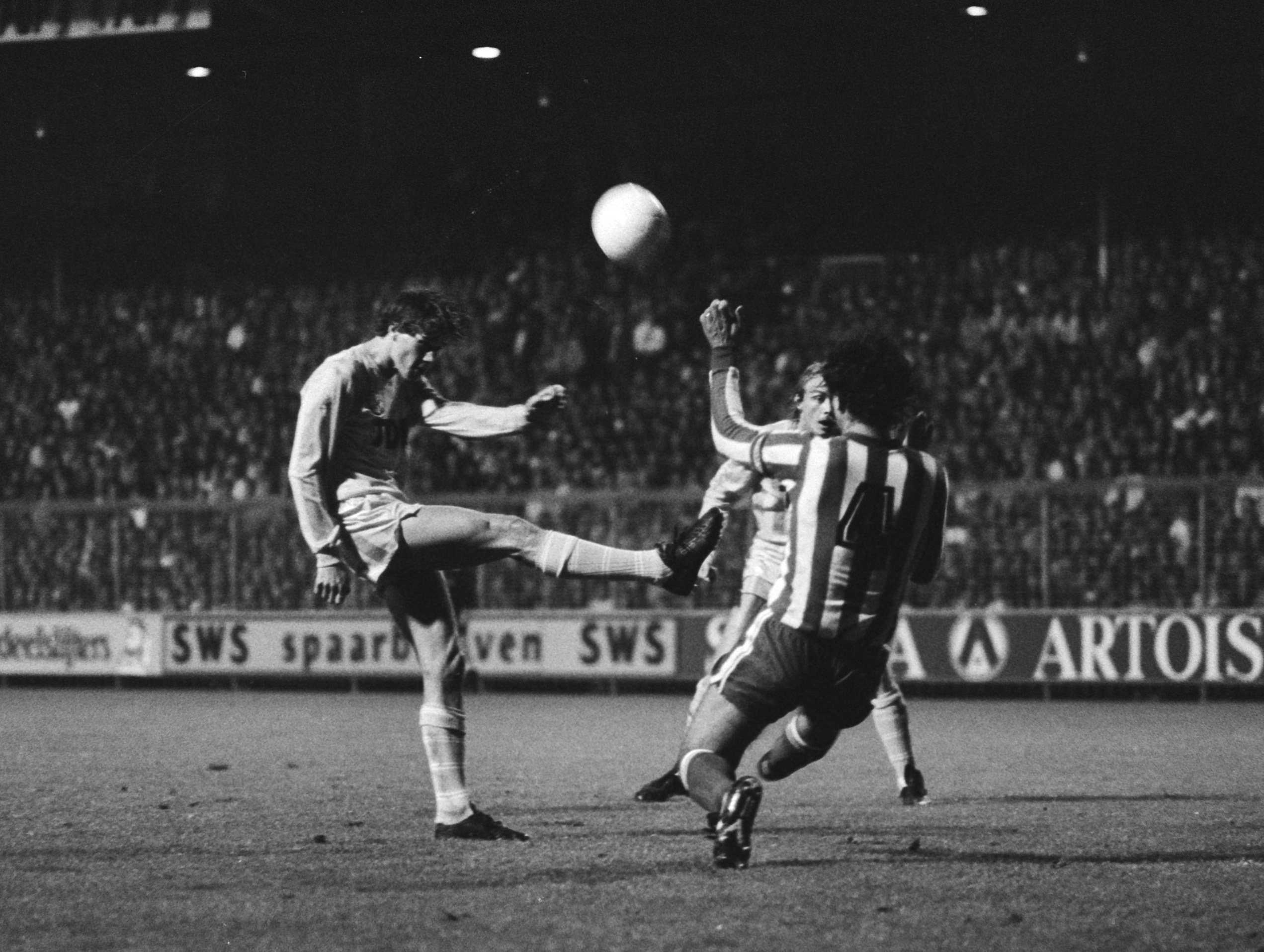
- Papadopoulos (right) in Olympiacos shirt fighting for the ball with Ajax's Marco van Basten

Personal information
- Date of birth: 6 September 1953 (age 73)
- Place of birth: Larnaca, British Cyprus
- Position: Defender

Senior career*
Years	Team	Apps	(Gls)
1970–1974	Pezoporikos		
1974–1977	Ethnikos Piraeus		
1977–1986	Olympiacos	203	(7)
1986–1989	Pezoporikos		

International career
1978–1986	Cyprus	10	(0)

Managerial career
- 1997: Cyprus
- 1999–2001: ENP
- Cyprus
- Ermis Aradippou
- Alki Larnaca
- * Club domestic league appearances and goals

Stavros Papadopoulos (Greek: Σταύρος Παπαδόπουλος; born 6 September 1953) is a Cypriot former football manager and footballer who last managed Alki Larnaca.

== Career ==
Papadopoulos has been regarded as one of the most important players in the Greek side Olympiacos during the late 1970s and early to mid 1980s.
