= Elvio Mana =

Argentine footballer

Personal information
- Full name: Esteban Elvio Mana
- Date of birth: 6 November 1950 (age 75)
- Place of birth: Buenos Aires, Argentina
- Position: Defender

Senior career*
Years	Team	Apps	(Gls)
–1972	Quilmes		
1972–1975	Kalamata	57	(2)
1975–1978	Panachaiki	60	(0)
1978–1981	Kavala	49	(1)
1981	AO Sparti		

Managerial career
- 2001, 2007, 2010: Kalamata
- * Club domestic league appearances and goals

Elvio Mana (born 6 November 1950) is an Argentine football player.

Mana began his playing career with Quilmes and appeared in nine Primera Division Argentina matches for the club. He moved to Greece where he had spells with Kalamata, Panachaiki and Kavala in the Alpha Ethniki.

Following his playing career, Mana became a manager for Kalamata.
