= Estadio (magazine) =

Sport magazine from Chile

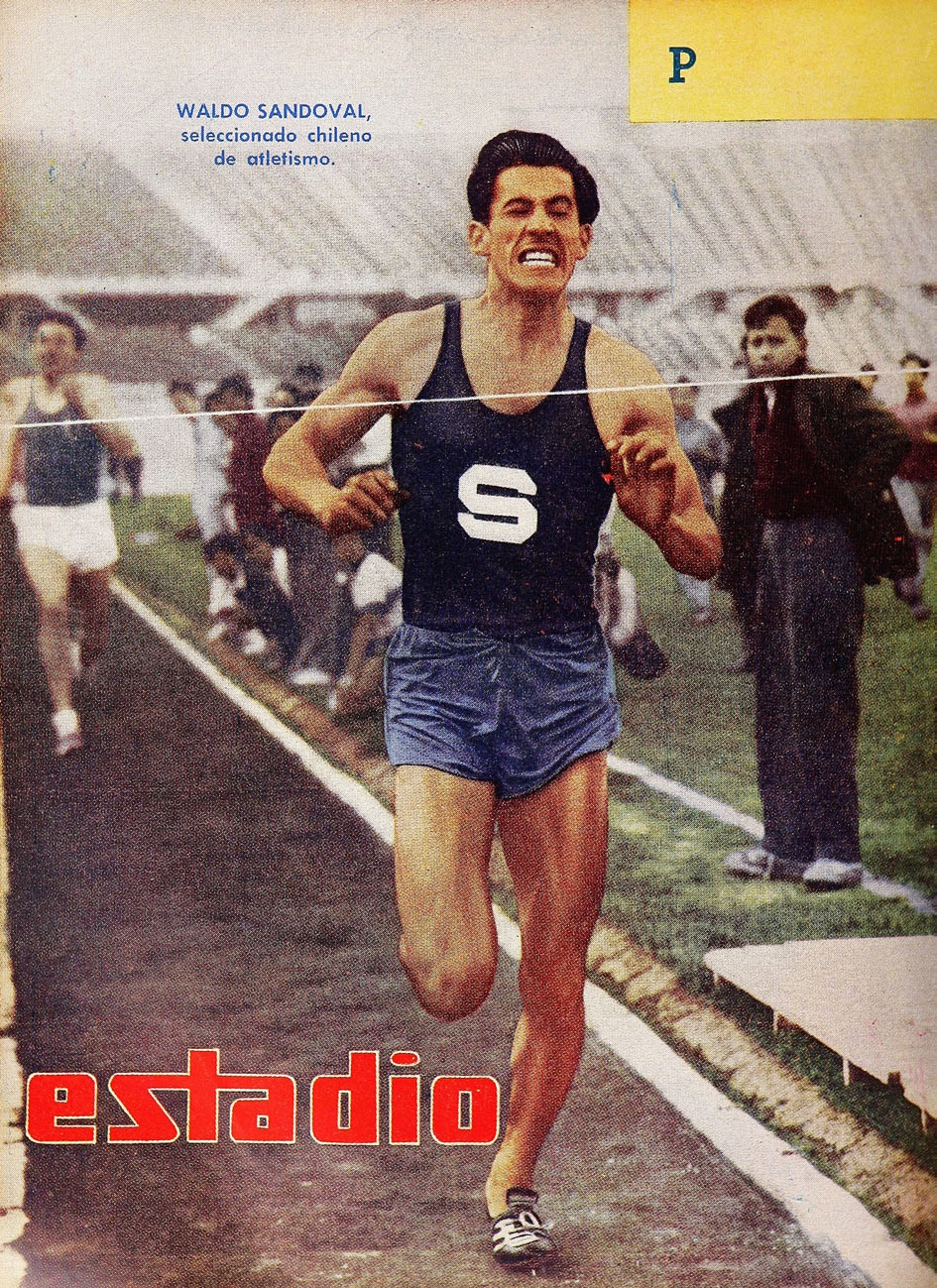
- A title page from March 1957, with Waldo Sandoval finishing a race.
- Editor: Antonino Vera Riquelme
- Categories: Sports
- First issue: 12 September 1941
- Country: Chile
- Language: Spanish

Estadio was a sports magazine from Chile, that specialized in Chilean football and other sports. It was regarded as the "principal sports publication in Chile" for 41 years, from 12 September 1941 until 5 October 1982, and it published 2,048 editions during this time.

The editorial office was located at Avda, Santa María 76, in Providencia, a commune in the city of Santiago. Regular sections of the paper were titled: Megáfono, Don Pampa, Jumar (a pseudonym for Julio Martínez), Pancho Alsina and the adventures of Cachupín.

== History ==
=== Special editions ===
- El Fútbol en el Mundo, published 15 May 1962, 132 pages.
- Aniversario: 25 Años de Publicación (Bodas de Plata), published 19 December 1966, with 100 pages.
- Colo Colo: Campeón 1981, published 28 January 1982, with 68 pages.
- Colo Colo: 57 Años con Chile published 16 April1982, with 62 pages.
- Mundial de España '82: Las 24 Selecciones, published 11 June 1982, with 110 pages.

== Directors ==
The editorial directors included the following:

Name	Period	Number of editions
Alejandro Jaramillo Neumann	12 September 1941 to 9 October 1969	1-1371
Antonino Vera Riquelme, como director interino	16 October 1969 to 6 November 1969	1372-1375
Antonino Vera Riquelme	13 November 1969 to 6 June 1979	1376-1869
Hernán Solís (de Ovando) Valenzuela	13 June 1979 to 2 December 1981	1870-1999
Reginald Budd Gaubert	9 December 1981 to 16 March 1982	2000-2014
Hendrick Karich Jacomet	23 March 1982 to 5 October 1982	2015-2043

== Bibliography ==
- Colección Revista Estadio (1941-1982).
- Diccionario Ilustrado del Fútbol - Tomo 4. De Francisco Mouat y Patricio Hidalgo (abril de 2010).
