= Nikos Anastopoulos =

Greek footballer

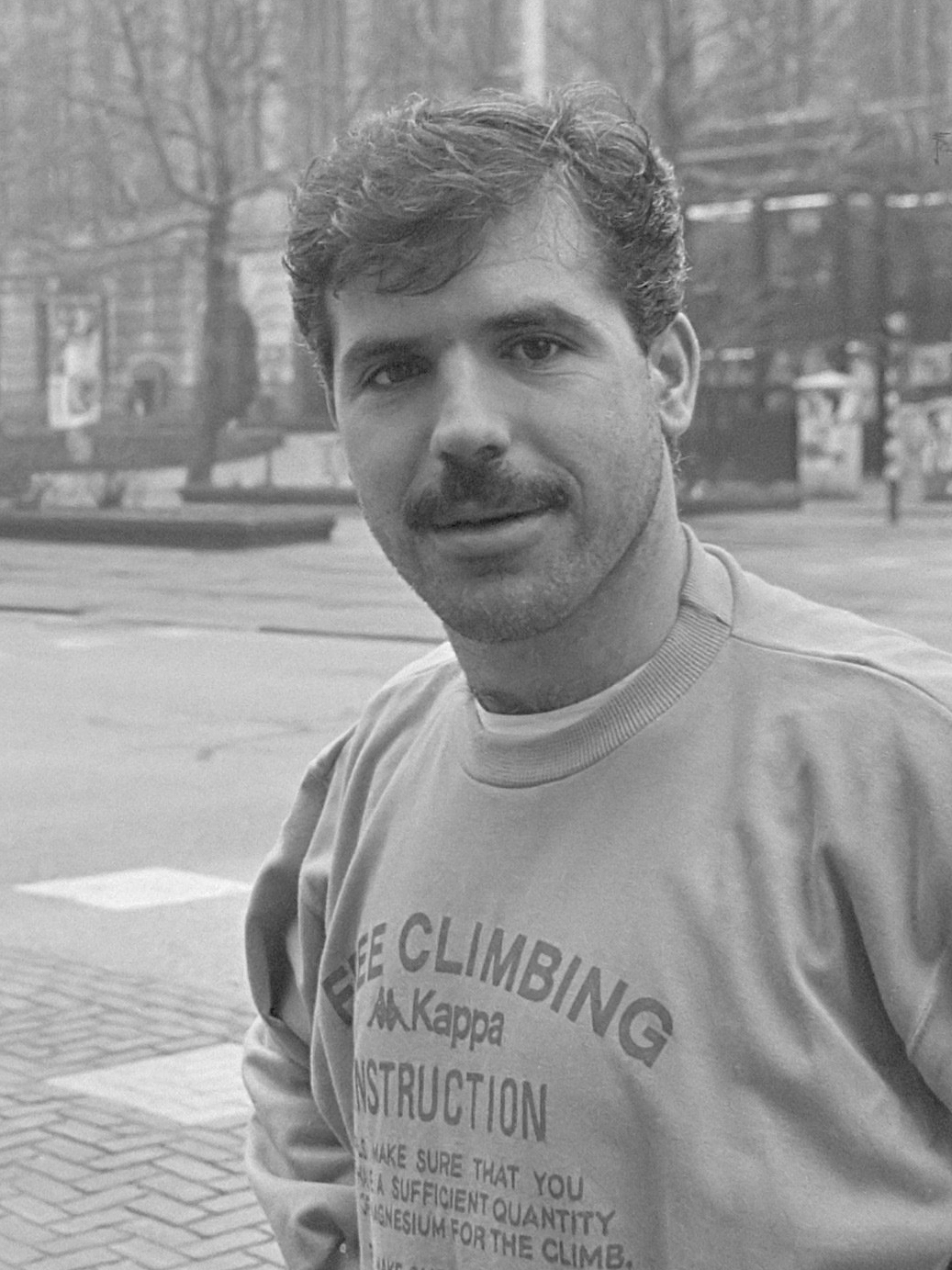
- Anastopoulos in 1987

Personal information
- Full name: Nikolaos Anastopoulos
- Date of birth: 22 January 1958 (age 68)
- Place of birth: Dafni, Athens, Greece
- Height: 1.76 m (5 ft 9 in)
- Position: Striker

Youth career
- Dafni

Senior career*
Years	Team	Apps	(Gls)
1976–1980	Panionios	117	(25)
1980–1987	Olympiacos	187	(115)
1987–1988	Avellino	16	(0)
1988–1989	Panionios	11	(5)
1989–1992	Olympiacos	72	(30)
1992–1993	Ionikos	19	(7)
1993–1994	Olympiacos	3	(0)
Total		425	(182)

International career
1977–1988	Greece	74	(29)

Managerial career
- 1993–1994: Olympiacos (assistant)
- 1995–1996: Panelefsiniakos
- 1997–1998: Panetolikos
- 1998–1999: PAS Giannina
- 1999: Panelefsiniakos
- 1999–2000: Panserraikos
- 2001: PAS Giannina
- 2002: Panachaiki
- 2002: Kallithea
- 2002–2003: PAS Giannina
- 2003–2005: Kerkyra
- 2005–2006: Aris
- 2006–2007: PAS Giannina
- 2008: Ethnikos Asteras
- 2008: Ionikos
- 2008–2009: Kavala
- 2010: PAS Giannina
- 2010–2012: OFI
- 2012–2013: Atromitos
- 2013–2014: Platanias
- 2014: Panionios
- 2015: OFI
- 2015–2017: Aris
- 2019: Kerkyra
- 2020–2022: Kalamata
- 2022–2023: Kalamata
- 2024: Kalamata
- 2026: Chania
- * Club domestic league appearances and goals

Nikos Anastopoulos (Greek: Νίκος Αναστόπουλος; born 22 January 1958) is a Greek former footballer and manager. He was one the most prolific strikers in the Greek league during the 1980s and is widely regarded as one of the best players in the history of Greek football.

Anastopoulos began his career at Panionios in 1976, where he quickly became a high-profile player, winning the cup in 1979. After impressive performances in the following season's Cup Winners' Cup campaign, he was reached out by a number of European clubs, eventually signing with Olympiacos. He quickly became a fan favourite with Olympiacos fans and, despite a slow start, became a prolific goal scorer for the club and won the Bronze Boot as the third scorer in Europe in the 1982–83 season. He became central to the club's success in the 1980s, winning four league championships before departing for Serie A side Avellino in 1987. An ambitious signing, his tenure at the Italian club was ultimately unsuccessful, with him returning to Panionios in 1988. After a moderately successful year with Panionios, he returned to Olympiacos in 1989. With the club in dire financial situation, he became a vital part of the club, despite falling out with manager Oleg Blokhin, winning two Greek Football Cups before leaving for Ionikos in 1992. After a successful season with the Athenian side, Anastopoulos returned to Olympiacos, retiring from professional football in 1993 to become assistant manager of returning manager Nikos Alefantos.

Anastopoulos earned his first cap with Greece in 1977, amassing a record (at the time) of 74 caps until 1988. With 29 goals, he is the all-time top scorer for the Greek national team. He also scored Greece's first goal at a major international tournament, scoring against Czechoslovakia at the 1980 European Championship.

His style of play was highly regarded and commonly noted for his acrobatic goals and headers, positioning, and sense of goal. He is considered one of the greatest players in Olympiacos history, where he scored 159 goals in 291 official games for the club.

Since retiring as a player he has become a football manager, achieving notable success at PAS Giannina, Panachaiki, Aris, OFI and Kalamata, becoming a fan favourite in these clubs. He became known for his outspoken attitude, tactical flexibility, and success under pressure, having achieved promotions with Aris and avoiding relegation on numerous occasions.

== Club career ==
Anastopoulos was born on 22 January 1958. He started his career at Dafni before transferring to Panionios with whom he debuted in the Alpha Ethniki in the 1977–78 season. Thanks to Anastopoulos, Panionios won the Greek Cup in 1979 upsetting AEK Athens 3–1. His debut in European competition was also impressive as he scored twice against FC Twente and once against IFK Göteborg in the Cup-winners' Cup. His performance brought an immediate transfer offer from Twente as well as other Greek and foreign clubs. Finally, in 1980, he went to Olympiacos.

As an Olympiacos player, Anastopoulos, also known as "Moustakias" (the moustachioed one), won top scorer honours in 1982–83 season (29 goals), 1983–84 season (18 goals), 1985–86 season (19 goals) and 1986–87 season (16 goals). His goal-scoring exploits in 1982–83 won him the Bronze Boot as third scorer across Europe.

Ahead of the 1987–88 season, Anastopoulos left Greece to play for Avellino in Italy. Though he performed well in the Italian Cup, he failed to score a single goal in Serie A and returned to Greece the following season.

After coming close to signing with AEK Athens, Anastopoulos chose to return to Panionios. He later played for Olympiacos, Ionikos and closed out his career with Olympiacos (once more) after the 1993–94 season.

== International career ==
On 21 September 1977, Anastopoulos made his debut for Greece and during his playing career he was capped 75 times scoring 29 goals – more than any other Greek international. He was a member of the Greek squad in the finals of Euro 1980 and scored the only Greek goal of that competition with a header against Czechoslovakia.

== Career statistics ==
=== Club ===
Appearances and goals by club, season and competition
Club	Season	League		National Cup		Europe		Total	
Club	Season	Apps	Goals	Apps	Goals	Apps	Goals	Apps	Goals
Panionios	1976–77	32	11	?	?	–		32+	11+
Panionios	1977–78	27	3	?	?	–		27+	3+
Panionios	1978–79	28	4	?	?	–		28+	4+
Panionios	1979–80	30	7	?	?	4	3	34+	10+
Panionios	Total	117	25	?	?	4	3	121+	28+
Olympiacos	1980–81	20	4	?	?	–		20+	4+
Olympiacos	1981–82	33 (Note: Includes a Championship play-off match against Panathinaikos in which he scored one goal)	14	?	?	2	1	35+	15+
Olympiacos	1982–83	31	29	?	?	4	1	35+	30+
Olympiacos	1983–84	30	18	?	?	4	3	34+	21+
Olympiacos	1984–85	28	15	?	?	4	2	32+	17+
Olympiacos	1985–86	24	19	?	?	–		24+	19+
Olympiacos	1986–87	21	16	?	?	4	3	25+	19+
Olympiacos	Total	187	115	?	?	18	10	205+	125+
Avellino	1987–88	16	0	?	?	–		16+	0+
Panionios	1988–89	11	5	?	?	–		11+	5+
Olympiacos	1989–90	22	7	?	?	6	2	28+	9+
Olympiacos	1990–91	26	17	?	?	4	2	30+	19+
Olympiacos	1991–92	24	6	?	?	–		24+	6+
Olympiacos	Total	72	30	?	?	10	4	82+	34+
Ionikos	1992–93	19	7	?	?	–		19+	7+
Olympiacos	1993–94	3	0	?	?	1	0	4+	0+
Career total		425	182	?	?	33	17	458+	199+

=== International ===
Appearances and goals by national team and year
National team	Year	Apps	Goals
Greece	1977	1	0
Greece	1978	0	0
Greece	1979	2	0
Greece	1980	5	2
Greece	1981	6	2
Greece	1982	9	4
Greece	1983	9	3
Greece	1984	11	5
Greece	1985	6	2
Greece	1986	8	4
Greece	1987	8	3
Greece	1988	9	4
Total		74	29

Scores and results list Greece's goal tally first, score column indicates score after each Anastopoulos goal.

List of international goals scored by Nikos Anastopoulos
No.	Date	Venue	Opponent	Score	Result	Competition
1	16 January 1980	GSP Stadium, Strovolos, Cyprus	Cyprus	1–0	1–1	Friendly
2	14 June 1980	Stadio Olimpico, Rome, Italy	Czechoslovakia	1–1	1–3	UEFA Euro 1980
3	23 September 1981	Charliaou Stadium, Thessaloniki, Greece	Sweden	1–0	2–1	Friendly
4	14 October 1981	Charliaou Stadium, Thessaloniki, Greece	Denmark	1–2	2–3	1982 FIFA World Cup qualification
5	20 January 1982	Nikos Goumas Stadium, Athens, Greece	Portugal	1–0	1–2	Friendly
6	9 October 1982	Stade Municipal, Luxembourg	Luxembourg	1–0	2–0	UEFA Euro 1984 qualifying
7	9 October 1982	Stade Municipal, Luxembourg	Luxembourg	2–0	2–0	UEFA Euro 1984 qualifying
8	1 December 1982	Olympic Stadium, Athens, Greece	Switzerland	1–1	1–3	Friendly
9	15 May 1983	Népstadion, Budapest, Hungary	Hungary	1–0	3–2	UEFA Euro 1984 qualifying
10	3 December 1983	Kaftanzoglio Stadium, Thessaloniki, Greece	Hungary	1–0	2–2	UEFA Euro 1984 qualifying
11	3 December 1983	Kaftanzoglio Stadium, Thessaloniki, Greece	Hungary	2–2	2–2	UEFA Euro 1984 qualifying
12	15 February 1984	Olympic Stadium, Athens, Greece	East Germany	1–0	1–3	Friendly
13	11 April 1984	Leoforos Alexandras Stadium, Athens, Greece	Cyprus	1–0	1–1	Friendly
14	1 September 1984	Tsirio Stadium, Limassol, Cyprus	Cyprus	2–0	2–0	Friendly
15	5 December 1984	Olympic Stadium, Athens, Greece	Romania	1–0	2–1	Friendly
16	5 December 1984	Olympic Stadium, Athens, Greece	Romania	2–1	2–1	Friendly
17	9 January 1985	Bloomfield Stadium, Tel Aviv, Israel	Israel	1–0	2–0	Friendly
18	19 May 1985	Olympic Stadium, Athens, Greece	Poland	1–1	1–4	1986 FIFA World Cup qualification
19	26 March 1986	Olympic Stadium, Athens, Greece	East Germany	1–0	2–0	Friendly
20	15 October 1986	Lech Stadium, Poznań, Poland	Poland	1–1	1–2	UEFA Euro 1988 qualifying
21	12 November 1986	Olympic Stadium, Athens, Greece	Hungary	2–0	2–1	UEFA Euro 1988 qualifying
22	3 December 1986	Makario Stadium, Nicosia, Cyprus	Cyprus	4–2	4–2	UEFA Euro 1988 qualifying
23	14 January 1987	Olympic Stadium, Athens, Greece	Cyprus	1–0	3–1	UEFA Euro 1988 qualifying
24	14 January 1987	Olympic Stadium, Athens, Greece	Cyprus	3–1	3–1	UEFA Euro 1988 qualifying
25	7 October 1987	Steaua Stadium, Bucharest, Romania	Romania	1–0	2–2	Friendly
26	21 May 1988	Varsity Stadium, Toronto, Canada	Canada	2–0	3–0	1988 Matthews Cup
27	21 May 1988	Varsity Stadium, Toronto, Canada	Canada	3–0	3–0	1988 Matthews Cup
28	23 May 1988	Varsity Stadium, Toronto, Canada	Chile	1–0	1–0	1988 Matthews Cup
29	21 September 1988	BJK İnönü Stadium, Istanbul, Turkey	Turkey	1–1	1–3	Friendly

== Managerial statistics ==
Team	From	To	Record				
Team	From	To	Played	W	D	L	Win %
Panelefsiniakos	July 1995	June 1996	39	12	15	12	30.77
Panetolikos	February 1997	February 1998	42	21	16	5	50.00
PAS Giannina	November 1998	May 1999	19	11	5	3	57.89
Panelefsiniakos	August 1999	October 1999	4	2	0	2	50.00
Panserraikos	November 1999	March 2000	17	10	4	3	58.82
Panetolikos	August 2000	January 2001	24	9	7	8	37.50
PAS Giannina	January 2001	June 2001	18	7	5	6	38.89
Panachaiki	February 2002	June 2002	12	2	5	5	16.67
Kallithea	September 2002	November 2002	7	3	1	3	42.86
PAS Giannina	November 2002	June 2003	26	5	7	14	19.23
Kerkyra	September 2003	January 2005	48	27	9	12	56.25
Aris	October 2005	June 2006	28	14	11	3	50.00
PAS Giannina	August 2006	January 2007	19	9	6	4	47.37
Ionikos	May 2008	June 2008	5	2	1	2	40.00
Kavala	December 2008	January 2009	6	2	1	3	33.33
PAS Giannina	January 2010	June 2010	16	5	2	9	31.25
OFI	September 2010	December 2012	90	42	20	28	46.67
Atromitos	December 2012	April 2013	13	4	5	4	30.77
Platanias	November 2013	February 2014	14	4	2	8	28.57
Panionios	February 2014	May 2014	9	3	3	3	33.33
OFI	January 2015	March 2015	16	4	1	11	25.00
Aris	September 2015	February 2017	55	39	11	5	70.91
Kerkyra	February 2019	April 2019	10	2	3	5	20.00
Kalamata	January 2020	February 2022	40	21	8	11	52.50
Kalamata	September 2022	January 2023	14	7	2	5	50.00
Kalamata	March 2024	October 2024	13	4	4	5	30.77
Total			605	272	155	178	44.96

== Honours ==
=== Player ===
Olympiacos

- Alpha Ethniki: 1980–81, 1981–82, 1982–83, 1986–87
- Greek Cup: 1989–90, 1991–92
- Greek Super Cup: 1992

Panionios

- Greek Cup: 1978–79

=== Manager ===
PAS Giannina

- Beta Ethniki: 2001–02

Aris

- Gamma Ethniki: 2015–16

Kalamata

- Gamma Ethniki: 2020–21
