= Giannis Pathiakakis =

Greek footballer

- Pathiakakis with AEK Athens

Personal information
- Full name: Ioannis Pathiakakis
- Date of birth: 15 June 1953
- Place of birth: Athens, Greece
- Date of death: 8 February 2002 (aged 48)
- Place of death: Ano Liosia, Athens Greece
- Position: Midfielder

Senior career*
Years	Team	Apps	(Gls)
1971–1977	Apollon Athens		
1977–1978	PAOK	18	(2)
1978–1980	Panionios	59	(22)
1980–1983	Apollon Athens	48	(5)
1983–1985	Ethnikos Piraeus	10	(1)
1985–1986	Korinthos	1	(0)

Managerial career
- 1986–1987: AO Melissia (player-coach)
- A.E. Messolonghi
- Pannafpliakos
- Ethnikos Piraeus
- 1994–1996: Apollon Athens
- 1996–1997: Athinaikos
- 1997: Ethnikos Piraeus
- 1999–2000: Akratitos
- 2000–2001: AEK Athens
- 2002: Akratitos
- * Club domestic league appearances and goals

Giannis Pathiakakis (Greek: Γιάννης Παθιακάκης; 15 June 1953 – 8 February 2002) was a Greek professional footballer who played as a midfielder and a later manager. After his death the stadium of Akratitos was named Yiannis Pathiakakis Stadium in his honour.

== Playing career ==
Pathiakakis started his football career in Apollon Athens, where he played from 1971 to 1977. He then played for one year in PAOK and in 1978 he was transferred to Nea Smyrni, in Panionios. In the three years he played in Panionios he was particularly productive. He was a key contributor to the progress of the Nea Smyrni club to winning the Greek Cup in 1979. He scored in both matches against Aris in the quarter-finals, as well as against Olympiacos in the semi-finals. In the final he scored the second of his team's three goals in a 3–1 win over AEK Athens. He also scored a goal the following season in a historic 4–0 win over Twente in the first round of the UEFA Cup Winners' Cup.

He left Panionios in 1980 his career playing for Apollon Athens, Ethnikos Piraeus and the Korinthos.

== Managerial career ==
Pathiakakis started as a coach at AO Melissia, where he was also a football player and then worked at A.E. Messolongi, Pannafpliakos and Ethnikos Piraeus.

In 1994 he sat on the bench Apollon Athens and associated his name with the most successful period in the club's history. Under his guidance, Apollon created a young team with excellent footballers who, with the help of some experienced players, play quality football. Demis Nikolaidis, Theofilos Karasavvidis, Bledar Kola and the older ones Antonis Minou, Frank Klopas, Tasos Mitropoulos give personality to the team. In his first season, he led them to 4th place and earned a place to the UEFA Cup of the following year, while in 1996 he reached the Cup final of the Greek Cup, where he was defeated 7–1 by AEK Athens.

A short stint at Athinaikos followed and he then took charge of Akratitos, which he promoted from the fourth to the second division.

In January 2000 he took charge of AEK Athens replacing Ljubiša Tumbaković. In the end of the season he won the Cup beating Ionikos by 3–0. and the following season, he led the club to the round of 16 of the UEFA Cup excluding Bayer Leverkusen. However, the elimination in the Cup by Olympiacos with a heavy 6–1 defeat led to his dismissal.

He was sidelined for a year until February 2002 when he was re-hired by Akratitos. But before he could really take over, he died during training of a heart attack.

== Death ==
Pathiakakis died of a heart attack five days after his return to Akratitos. He cooled down at the Ano Liosia Stadium during training on 8 February 2002 at the age of 49. Four years earlier he had suffered another heart attack at the same stadium and had undergone a double bypass, but despite doctors' advice to avoid excitement, he chose to continue "living dangerously" as a coach. At the same time, he did not stop smoking.

Everything happened so fast that no one had time to react. The training session was almost over and Pathiakakis was playing a bet with goalkeeper Gintaras Staučė, shooting him from outside the area. He had won the first game and when the Lithuanian goalkeeper asked for a rematch, the coach suddenly fell down. They rushed to him for first aid but the fatality soon occurred before the ambulance arrived. At the hospital, he was pronounced dead from an acute myocardial infarction.

The management of Akratitos decided to name the stadium "Yiannis Pathiakakis Stadium" as a sign of memory to the coach who sealed the association with his death, which from the local categories of Athens and raised it to the second division.

The football club A.O. Yiannis Pathiakakis from Dionysos bears his name.

== Honours ==
=== Player ===
Panionios

- Greek Cup: 1978–79

=== Manager ===
Akratitos

- Delta Ethniki: 1998–99 (1st Group)
- Greek Football Amateur Cup: 1997–98
- Athens Cup: 1996–97

AEK Athens

- Greek Cup: 1999–2000
