= Noni Lima =

Cape Verdean football manager (born 1956)

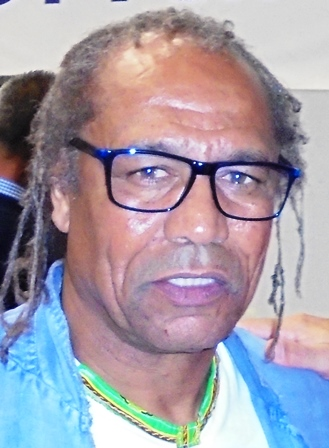

Personal information
- Full name: Leonildo Lima Batista
- Date of birth: 1 October 1956 (age 70)
- Place of birth: São Vicente, Cape Verde
- Height: 1.75 m (5 ft 9 in)
- Position: Midfielder

Senior career*
| Years | Team | Apps | (Gls) |
- Castilho (Mindelo)
| 1976–1988 | Panionios | 304 | (23) |
| 1988–1992 | Charavgiakos | 107 | (6) |

Managerial career
- 1992–1994: Messolonghi
- 1995–1996: Charavgiakos
- 1998–1999: Dorikos
- 2003–2004: Achaiki
- 2004–2005: Pannaxiakos
- 2005–2006: Ariadni Naxou
- 2006: Thiva
- 2006: Pannaxiakos
- 2007–2008: Ermis Ermioni
- 2010–2011: Attalos
- 2011–2018: Panionios (assistant)
- 2018–2019: Pannaxiakos
- * Club domestic league appearances and goals

Noni Lima (Greek: Νόνι Λίμα; born 1 October 1956) is a Cape Verdean football manager and former footballer.

== Club career ==
Lima started his career with Greek side Panionios, where he was regarded as one of the club's most important players.

== International career ==
After retiring from professional football, Lima worked as a manager.

== Style of play ==
Lima mainly operated as an attacking midfielder and could operate in other positions.

== Personal life ==
Lima is the uncle of the Greek international footballer, Daniel Batista Lima and the father of Greek footballer Konstantinos Lima.
