= 1978–79 Greek Football Cup =

1978–79 Greek Cup
Tournament details
- Country: Greece
- Teams: 58

Final positions
- Champions: Panionios (1st title)
- Runners-up: AEK Athens

Tournament statistics
- Matches played: 62
- Goals scored: 195 (3.15 per match)
- Top goal scorer(s): Dušan Bajević (9 goals)

The 1978–79 Greek Football Cup was the 37th edition of the Greek Football Cup.

== Tournament details ==
Totally 58 teams participated, 18 from Alpha Ethniki and 40 from Beta Ethniki. It was held in 6 rounds, included final. That year was established for first time the two-legged tie on a home and away basis, for the quarter-finals and the semi-finals, according to the model of European cups.

Up to those matches, the most exciting games were on the third round. From the 8 matches, only 2 were decided after 90 minutes. In matches between Aris and Panathinaikos and Olympiacos and PAOK, the home teams qualified on penalty shoot-out. Aris had earlier eliminated Iraklis in similar fashion.

The final was contested by the champion of that season, AEK Athens and Panionios, who qualified for a Greek Cup final after 12 years. Panionios advanced by eliminating both Aris, in quarter-finals, with a 5–1 home victory after their 5–2 away defeat, and Olympiacos, in semi-finals, with away goals rule. The surprise of the underdog was completed in the final, held at Karaiskakis Stadium, on 9 June 1979, where Panionios won 3–1, claiming their first title in history.

== Calendar ==
Round	Date(s)	Fixtures	Clubs	New entries
First Round	8, 9, 16 November 1978	28	58 → 29	58
Second Round	31 January & 1 February 1979	13	29 → 16	none
Round of 16	21, 22 February 1979	8	16 → 8	none
Quarter-finals	14 March, 18 April 1979	8	8 → 4	none
Semi-finals	16, 30 May 1979	4	4 → 2	none
Final	9 June 1979	1	2 → 1	none

== Knockout phase ==
Each tie in the knockout phase, apart from the first three rounds and the final, was played over two legs, with each team playing one leg at home. The team that scored more goals on aggregate over the two legs advanced to the next round. If the aggregate score was level, the away goals rule was applied, i.e. the team that scored more goals away from home over the two legs advanced. If away goals were also equal, then extra time was played. The away goals rule was again applied after extra time, i.e. if there were goals scored during extra time and the aggregate score was still level, the visiting team advanced by virtue of more away goals scored. If no goals were scored during extra time, the winners were decided by a penalty shoot-out. In the first three rounds and the final, which were played as a single match, if the score was level at the end of normal time, extra time was played, followed by a penalty shoot-out if the score was still level.
The mechanism of the draws for each round is as follows:

- There are no seedings, and teams from the same group can be drawn against each other.

== First round ==
Team 1	Score	Team 2
Panachaiki	3–0	Veria
Aris	3–2	Makedonikos
Korinthos	1–0	Irodotos
Kallithea	3–1	PAS Giannina
Agrotikos Asteras	1–0	Chania
Xanthi	2–0 (w/o)	Anagennisi Arta
PAOK	2–1	Panelefsiniakos
Ilisiakos	0–1	Olympiacos
Anagennisi Karditsa	0–2	Rodos
Atromitos	4–1	Apollon Kalamarias
Ethnikos Piraeus	3–1 (a.e.t.)	Olympiacos Liosia
AEK Athens	5–2	Kavala
Panarkadikos	0–1	OFI
Ethnikos Asteras	0–2	Niki Volos
Fostiras	2–0	Ionikos
Panionios	3–1	Olympiakos Loutraki
Egaleo	3–2	AEL
Trikala	4–3	Makedonikos Siatista
Edessaikos	3–2 (a.e.t.)	Anagennisi Giannitsa
Almopos Aridea	3–0	Olympiacos Volos
Apollon Athens	2–0	Panserraikos
Drapetsona	0–2	Iraklis
Chalkida	2–0	Lamia
Kilkisiakos	2–3 (a.e.t.)	Acharnaikos
Anagennisi Epanomi	1–0	Panetolikos
Naoussa	1–2	Doxa Drama
Panathinaikos	3–1	Pierikos
Proodeftiki	4–1	Kastoria
A.O. Karditsa	1–0	Levadiakos

== Bracket ==
Second round
Iraklis	1(4)
Aris (p)	1(5)
OFI	2
Panathinaikos	3
Panionios (a.e.t.)	3
Edessaikos	2
Almopos Aridea	2
Agrotikos Asteras	1
Fostiras (a.e.t.)	2
Rodos	1
Korinthos	1
Doxa Drama	2
Ethnikos Piraeus	0
Olympiacos	1
PAOK (bye)
Kallithea	6
Xanthi	1
Apollon Athens	2
Egaleo	0
A.O. Karditsa (a.e.t.)	1
Chalkida	0
Panachaiki (bye)
Anagennisi Epanomi	1
Niki Volos	0
Trikala	1
Atromitos	0
AEK Athens	4
Proodeftiki	0
Acharnaikos (bye)

Round of 16
Aris (p)	0(5)
Panathinaikos	0(4)
Panionios	1
Almopos Aridea	0
Fostiras (p)	0(3)
Doxa Drama	0(1)
Olympiacos (p)	2(6)
PAOK	2(5)
Kallithea (a.e.t.)	1
Apollon Athens	0
A.O. Karditsa	1
Panachaiki (a.e.t.)	2
Anagennisi Epanomi (a.e.t.)	1
Trikala	0
AEK Athens	4
Acharnaikos	0

Quarter-finals
Aris	5	1	6
Panionios	2	5	7
Fostiras	2	2	4
Olympiacos (a.e.t.)	2	3	5
Kallithea	2	0	2
Panachaiki (a)	1	1	2
Anagennisi Epanomi	1	0	1
AEK Athens	1	2	3

Semi-finals
Panionios (a)	2	2	4
Olympiacos	1	3	4
Panachaiki	3	1	4
AEK Athens	2	5	7

Final
Panionios	3
AEK Athens	1

== Second round ==
Team 1	Score	Team 2
Apollon Athens	2–0	Egaleo
Panionios	3–2 (a.e.t.)	Edessaikos
AEK Athens	4–0	Proodeftiki
Trikala	1–0	Atromitos
Kallithea	6–1	Xanthi
OFI	2–3	Panathinaikos
A.O. Karditsa	1–0 (a.e.t.)	Chalkida
Korinthos	1–2	Doxa Drama
Iraklis	1–1 (4–5 p)	Aris
Anagennisi Epanomi	1–0	Niki Volos
Ethnikos Piraeus	0–1	Olympiacos
Almopos Aridea	2–1	Agrotikos Asteras
Fostiras	2–1 (a.e.t.)	Rodos
PAOK	bye	
Panachaiki	bye	
Acharnaikos	bye	

== Round of 16 ==
Team 1	Score	Team 2
Aris	0–0 (5–4 p)	Panathinaikos
A.O. Karditsa	1–2 (a.e.t.)	Panachaiki
Anagennisi Epanomi	1–0 (a.e.t.)	Trikala
AEK Athens	4–0	Acharnaikos
Olympiacos	2–2 (6–5 p)	PAOK
Kallithea	1–0 (a.e.t.)	Apollon Athens
Panionios	1–0	Almopos Aridea
Fostiras	0–0 (3–1 p)	Doxa Drama

== Quarter-finals ==
Team 1	Agg.	Team 2	1st leg	2nd leg
Fostiras	4–5	Olympiacos	2–2	2–3 (a.e.t.)
Anagennisi Epanomi	1–3	AEK Athens	1–1	0–2
Kallithea	2–2 (a)	Panachaiki	2–1	0–1
Aris	6–7	Panionios	5–2	1–5

== Semi-finals ==
Team 1	Agg.	Team 2	1st leg	2nd leg
Panachaiki	4–7	AEK Athens	3–2	1–5
Panionios	(a) 4–4	Olympiacos	2–1	2–3

== Final ==
9 June 1979
21:00 EEST

Panionios	3–1	AEK Athens
Anastopoulos 51'; Lima 67'; Pathiakakis 84'	Report	Konstantinou 3'

Karaiskakis Stadium, Piraeus
Attendance: 20,299
Referee: Nikos Lagogiannis (Piraeus)
