= Greece national football team results (1980–1999) =

This article provides details of international football games played by the Greece national football team from 1980 to 1999.

== Results ==
Key
Win
Draw
Defeat

=== 1980 ===
16 January 1980 Friendly	Cyprus	1–1	Greece	Nicosia, Cyprus
15:00	D. Kyzas 80'		Anastopoulos 28'	Stadium: GSP Stadium; Attendance: 8,456; Referee: Theodosis Aspris (Cyprus)

27 February 1980 Friendly	France	5–1	Greece	Paris, France
20:30	Bathenay 7'; Platini 37' 62'; Christophe 63'; Stopyra 66'		Mavros 32'	Stadium: Parc des Princes; Attendance: 29,992; Referee: José Luis García Carrión (Spain)

1 April 1980 Friendly	Switzerland	2–0	Greece	Zürich, Switzerland
20:00	Schnyder 9' 76'			Stadium: Hardturm; Attendance: 15.000; Referee: Dusan Krchnak (Slovakia)

16 April 1980 Friendly	East Germany	2–0	Greece	Leipzig, East Germany
17:00	Weber 64'; Streich 78'			Stadium: Zentralstadion; Attendance: 20.000

14 May 1980 Friendly	Greece	0–0	Bulgaria	Athens, Greece
17:00				Stadium: Leoforos Alexandras Stadium; Attendance: 20.000; Referee: Sotos Afxentiou (Cyprus)

11 June 1980 UEFA Euro 1980 Group 1	Greece	0–1	Netherlands	Naples, Italy
20:30			Kist 64'(pen.)	Stadium: Stadio San Paolo; Attendance: 14.990; Referee: Adolf Prokop (East Germany)

14 June 1980 UEFA Euro 1980 Group 1	Czechoslovakia	3–1	Greece	Rome, Italy
20:30	Panenka 6'; Vizek 26'; Nehoda 63'		Anastopoulos 11'	Stadium: Stadio Olimpico; Attendance: 7.600; Referee: Patrick Partridge (England)

17 June 1980 UEFA Euro 1980 Group 1	West Germany	1–1	Greece	Turin, Italy
20:30				Stadium: Stadio Olimpico Grande Torino; Attendance: 13.901; Referee: Brian McGinlay (Scotland)

15 October 1980 1982 FIFA World Cup qualification	Denmark	0–1	Greece	Copenhagen, Denmark
19:30			Kouis 50'	Stadium: Københavns Idrætspark; Attendance: 47.500; Referee: Eamonn Farrell (Ireland)

11 November 1980 Friendly	Greece	3–3	Australia	Athens, Greece
14:45	Damanakis 25'; Domazos 68'; Delikaris 90'		Cole 24'; Barnes 84'; Selemidis 88'	Stadium: Leoforos Alexandras Stadium; Attendance: 11.300; Referee: Vasilis Vourakis (Greece)

6 December 1980 1982 FIFA World Cup qualification	Greece	0–2	Italy	Athens, Greece
14:30			Antognoni 11'; Scirea 81'	Stadium: Leoforos Alexandras Stadium; Attendance: 25.000; Referee: Michel Vautrot (France)

=== 1981 ===
28 January 1981 1982 FIFA World Cup qualification	Greece	2–0	Luxembourg	Thessaloniki, Greece
15:00	Kouis 8'; Kostikos 38'			Stadium: Kleanthis Vikelidis Stadium; Attendance: 14.000; Referee: Nikola Dubin (Bulgaria)

11 March 1981 1982 FIFA World Cup qualification	Luxembourg	0–2	Greece	Luxembourg City, Luxembourg
19:15			Kouis 38'; Mavros 55'	Stadium: Stade Municipal; Attendance: 8.000; Referee: Peter Scherz (Switzerland)

15 April 1981 Friendly	Cyprus	0–1	Greece	Nicosia, Cyprus
20:30			Iosifidis 33'	Stadium: Makario Stadium; Attendance: 10.000; Referee: George Chrisanthou (Cyprus)

29 April 1981 1982 FIFA World Cup qualification	Yugoslavia	5–1	Greece	Split, Yugoslavia
18:00	Sljivo 6'; Halilhodzic 23'; Pantelic 43'; Vujovic 50' 75'		Kostikos 76'	Stadium: Gradski stadion u Poljudu; Attendance: 45.000; Referee: Valeri Butenko (USSR)

23 September 1981 Friendly	Greece	2–1	Sweden	Thessaloniki, Greece
16:30	Anastopoulos 7'; Kouis 72'		Larsson 8'	Stadium: Kleanthis Vikelidis Stadium; Attendance: 10.000

14 October 1981 1982 FIFA World Cup qualification	Greece	2–3	Denmark	Thessaloniki, Greece
15:30	Anastopoulos 60'; Kouis 85'		Lerby 6'; Arnesen 28'; Elkjaer-Larsen 63'	Stadium: Kleanthis Vikelidis Stadium; Attendance: 18.000; Referee: Josef Bucek (Austria)

14 November 1981 1982 FIFA World Cup qualification	Italy	1–1	Greece	Turin, Italy
14:30	Conti 61'		Kouis 87'	Stadium: Stadio Comunale; Attendance: 39,670; Referee: Nicolae Rainea (Romania)

29 November 1981 1982 FIFA World Cup qualification	Greece	1–2	Yugoslavia	Piraeus, Greece
14:30	Mavros 6'		Šurjak 23'; Jerkovic 39'	Stadium: Karaiskakis Stadium; Attendance: 11,595; Referee: George Courtney (England)

=== 1982 ===
20 January 1982 Friendly	Greece	1–2	Portugal	Athens, Greece
	Anastopoulos 24'		Oliveira 42' 77'	Stadium: Nikos Goumas Stadium; Attendance: 8.753; Referee: Günter Linn (West Germany)

10 February 1982 Friendly	Greece	0–1	East Germany	Athens, Greece
			Liebers 71'	Stadium: Rizoupoli Stadium; Attendance: 4.000; Referee: Paolo Bergamo (Italy)

10 March 1982 Friendly	Greece	0–2	Soviet Union	Athens, Greece
			Cherenkov 39'; Buryak 50'	Stadium: Nikos Goumas Stadium; Attendance: 12.000; Referee: Jean-Marie Macheret (Switzerland)

24 March 1982 Friendly	Czechoslovakia	2–1	Greece	Prague, Czechoslovakia
	Radimec 50'; Jarolim 86'		Kouis 37'	Stadium: Stadion Evžena Rošického; Attendance: 10.000; Referee: Heinz Fahnler (Austria)

14 April 1982 Friendly	Netherlands	1–0	Greece	Eindhoven, Netherlands
	Ophof 54'			Stadium: PSV Stadion; Attendance: 16.500; Referee: Georges Konrath (France)

9 October 1982 UEFA Euro 1984 qualifying	Luxembourg	0–2	Greece	Luxembourg City, Luxembourg
			Anastopoulos 6' 25'	Stadium: Stade Josy Barthel; Attendance: 3.500; Referee: Karl-Heinz Tritschler (West Germany)

27 October 1982 Friendly	Cyprus	1–1	Greece	Nicosia, Cyprus
	Giagoudakis 90'		Mavros 89'	Stadium: GSP Stadium; Attendance: 3.500

17 November 1982 UEFA Euro 1984 qualifying	Greece	0–3	England	Thessaloniki, Greece
			Woodcock 2' 62'; Lee 68'	Stadium: Kaftanzoglio Stadium; Attendance: 41.534; Referee: Adolf Prokop (East Germany)

1 December 1982 Friendly	Greece	1–3	Switzerland	Athens, Greece
	Anastopoulos 23'		Egli 9'; Sulser 61' 79'	Stadium: Olympic Stadium; Attendance: 20.000; Referee: Ahmed Yasharov (Bulgaria)

22 December 1982 Friendly	Greece	1–0	Cyprus	Ioannina, Greece
	Semertziis 86'			Stadium: Zosimades Stadium; Attendance: 8.000

=== 1983 ===
2 February 1983 Friendly	Greece	1–3	Romania	Larissa, Greece
	Kousoulakis 16'		Bölöni 10'; Camataru 24' 46'	Stadium: Alcazar Stadium; Attendance: 16.000; Referee: Evangelos Giannakoudakis (Greece)

23 February 1983 Friendly	East Germany	2–1	Greece	Dresden, East Germany
	Richter 18'; Streich 33'		Ardizoglou 30'	Stadium: Rudolf-Harbig-Stadion; Attendance: 7.000; Referee: Ivan Grégr (Czech Republic)

30 March 1983 UEFA Euro 1984 qualifying	England	0–0	Greece	London, England
				Stadium: Wembley; Attendance: 48.500; Referee: Dusan Krhnak (Slovakia)

27 April 1983 UEFA Euro 1984 qualifying	Denmark	1–0	Greece	Copenhagen, Denmark
	Busk 76'			Stadium: Parken; Attendance: 33.700; Referee: Romualdas Juska (USSR)

15 May 1983 UEFA Euro 1984 qualifying	Hungary	2–3	Greece	Budapest, Hungary
	Nyilasi 25'; Hajszán 89'		Anastopoulos 16'; Kostikos 33'; Papaioannou 51'	Stadium: Népstadion; Attendance: 15.000; Referee: Edvard Sostaric (Slovenia)

5 October 1983 Friendly	Italy	3–0	Greece	Bari, Italy
	Giordano 15'; Cabrini 23'; Rossi 36'			Stadium: Stadio della Vittoria; Attendance: 40.000; Referee: Horst Brummeier (Austria)

16 November 1983 UEFA Euro 1984 qualifying	Greece	0–2	Denmark	Athens, Greece
			Elkjaer-Larsen 17'; Simonsen 48'	Stadium: Olympic Stadium; Attendance: 38.000; Referee: Paolo Bergamo (Italy)

3 December 1983 UEFA Euro 1984 qualifying	Greece	2–2	Hungary	Thessaloniki, Greece
	Anastopoulos 6' 56'		Kardos 12'; Törőcsik 41'	Stadium: Kaftanzoglio Stadium; Attendance: 1.500; Referee: Ioan Igna (Romania)

14 December 1983 UEFA Euro 1984 qualifying	Greece	1–0	Luxembourg	Piraeus, Greece
	Saravakos 18'			Stadium: Karaiskakis Stadium; Attendance: 8.000; Referee: Velicho Tsonchev (Bulgaria)

=== 1984 ===
18 January 1984 Friendly	Greece	1–0	Poland	Piraeus, Greece
	Karoulias 52'			Stadium: Karaiskakis Stadium; Attendance: 7.000; Referee: Nikos Fakis (Greece)

15 February 1984 Friendly	Greece	1–3	East Germany	Athens, Greece
	Anastopoulos 33'		Döschner 67'; Raab 82'; Gütschow 85'	Stadium: Olympic Stadium; Attendance: 10.000; Referee: Michalis Antoniou (Greece)

7 March 1984 Friendly	Romania	2–0	Greece	Craiova, Romania
	Coras 16'; Mateut 60'			Stadium: Politehnika Stadium; Attendance: 15.000; Referee: Menachem Ashkenazi (Israel)

11 April 1984 Friendly	Greece	1–1	Cyprus	Athens, Greece
	Anastopoulos 5'		Theofanous 72'	Stadium: Leoforos Alexandras Stadium; Attendance: 2.942

18 April 1984 Friendly	Austria	0–0	Greece	Vienna, Austria
				Stadium: Praterstadion; Attendance: 10.000; Referee: Werner Föckler (West Germany)

1 September 1984 Friendly	Cyprus	0–2	Greece	Limassol, Cyprus
			Mitsibonas 84'; Anastopoulos 90'	Stadium: Tsirio Stadium; Attendance: 6.000; Referee: Kyros Georgiou (Cyprus)

5 September 1984 Friendly	Greece	0–1	Czechoslovakia	Athens, Greece
			Berger 65'	Stadium: Olympic Stadium; Attendance: 4.136; Referee: Milorad Vlajic (Yugoslavia)

12 September 1984 Friendly	East Germany	1–0	Greece	Zwickau, East Germany
	Gütschow 24'			Stadium: Westsachsenstadion; Attendance: 3.000; Referee: Erik Fredriksson (Sweden)

9 October 1984 Friendly	Greece	2–2	Israel	Athens, Greece
	Semertzidis 15'; Manolas 84'		Cohen 13'; Ohana 51'	Stadium: Olympic Stadium; Attendance: 2.500; Referee: Sotos Afxentiou (Cyprus)

17 October 1984 1986 FIFA World Cup qualification	Poland	3–1	Greece	Zabrze, Poland
	Smolarek 61'; Dziekanowski 64' 79'		Mitropoulos 34'	Stadium: Stadion Górnika; Attendance: 15.000; Referee: Svein Inge Thime (Norway)

5 December 1984 Friendly	Greece	2–1	Romania	Athens, Greece
	Anastopoulos 49' 87'		Mateut 34'	Stadium: Olympic Stadium; Attendance: 1.037; Referee: Damir Matovinovic (Yugoslavia)

19 December 1984 1986 FIFA World Cup qualification	Greece	0–0	Belgium	Athens, Greece
				Stadium: Olympic Stadium; Attendance: 15.000; Referee: Heinz Fahnler (Austria)

=== 1985 ===
9 January 1985 Friendly	Israel	0–2	Greece	Tel Aviv, Israel
			Anastopoulos 23'; Kofidis 72'	Stadium: Bloomfield Stadium; Attendance: 3.000; Referee: Jakob Baumann (Israel)

27 February 1985 1986 FIFA World Cup qualification	Greece	2–0	Albania	Athens, Greece
	Saravakos 9'; Antoniou 37'			Stadium: Olympic Stadium; Attendance: 20.000; Referee: Ioan Igna (Romania)

13 March 1985 Friendly	Greece	0–0	Italy	Athens, Greece
				Stadium: Olympic Stadium; Attendance: 8.000; Referee: Lajos Németh (Hungary)

27 March 1985 1986 FIFA World Cup qualification	Belgium	2–0	Greece	Brussels, Belgium
	Vercauteren 69'; Scifo 89'			Stadium: Heysel Stadium; Attendance: 32.000; Referee: Keith Stuart Hackett (England)

19 May 1985 1986 FIFA World Cup qualification	Greece	1–4	Poland	Athens, Greece
	Anastopoulos 47'		Smolarek 24'; Ostrowski 57'; Zbigniew Boniek 78'; Dziekanowski 89'	Stadium: Olympic Stadium; Attendance: 52.500; Referee: Zoran Petrovic (Yugoslavia)

16 October 1985 Friendly	Greece	0–2	Bulgaria	Thessaloniki, Greece
			Kolev 68'; Sadakov 79'	Stadium: Kaftanzoglio Stadium; Attendance: 8.000; Referee: Milorad Vlajic (Yugoslavia)

30 October 1985 1986 FIFA World Cup qualification	Albania	1–1	Greece	Tirana, Albania
	Muça 6'		Skartados 54'	Stadium: Qemal Stafa Stadium; Attendance: 17.000; Referee: Raul Nazaré (Portugal)

=== 1986 ===
17 January 1986 Friendly	Qatar	0–1	Greece	Doha, Qatar
			Saravakos 12'	Stadium: Khalifa International Stadium; Attendance: 500

19 February 1986 Friendly	Greece	0–0	Cyprus	Athens, Greece
				Stadium: Olympic Stadium; Attendance: 2.500; Referee: Gerasimos Germanakos (Greece)

26 March 1986 Friendly	Greece	2–0	East Germany	Athens, Greece
	Anastopoulos 63'; Saravakos 85'			Stadium: Olympic Stadium; Attendance: 7.000; Referee: Christos Kolokithas (Greece)

1 May 1986 Friendly	Sweden	0–0	Greece	Malmö, Sweden
				Stadium: Malmö Stadion; Attendance: 9.994; Referee: Thorbjörn Aass (Norway)

24 September 1986 Friendly	Spain	3–1	Greece	Gijón, Spain
	Salinas 35'; Francisco 39'; Muñoz 79'		Skartados 81'	Stadium: El Molinón; Attendance: 15.000; Referee: Alain Delmer (France)

8 October 1986 Friendly	Italy	2–0	Greece	Bologna, Italy
	Bergomi 8' 68'			Stadium: Stadio Renato Dall'Ara; Attendance: 45.000; Referee: Renzo Peduzzi (Italy)

15 October 1986 UEFA Euro 1988 qualifying	Poland	2–1	Greece	Poznań, Poland
	Dziekanowski 4' 38'		Anastopoulos 13'	Stadium: Stadion Poznań; Attendance: 32.5000; Referee: Emilio Soriano Aladrén (Spain)

12 November 1986 UEFA Euro 1988 qualifying	Greece	2–1	Hungary	Athens, Greece
	Mitropoulos 32'; Anastopoulos 65'		Boda 73'	Stadium: Olympic Stadium; Attendance: 60.000; Referee: Velodi Miminoshvili (Georgia)

3 December 1986 UEFA Euro 1988 qualifying	Cyprus	2–4	Greece	Nicosia, Cyprus
	Christofi 28'; Savvides 41'	Report	Antoniou 13'; Papaioannou 48'; Batsinilas 73'; Anastopoulos 86' (pen.)	Stadium: Makario Stadium; Attendance: 15,000; Referee: Velichko Tsonchev (Bulgaria)

=== 1987 ===
7 January 1987 Friendly	Portugal	1–1	Greece	Portalegre, Portugal
	Coelho 73'	Report	Batsinilas 89'	Attendance: 5,000; Referee: Emilio Guruceta Muro

14 January 1987 UEFA Euro 1988 qualifying	Greece	3–1	Cyprus	Athens, Greece
	Anastopoulos 54', 66'; Bonovas 63'	Report	Savva 60'	Stadium: Olympic Stadium; Attendance: 40,850; Referee: Helmut Kohl

11 March 1987 Friendly	Greece	1–1	Romania	Piraeus, Greece
	Saravakos 52'		Hagi 83'	Stadium: Karaiskakis Stadium; Attendance: 6.000; Referee: Gerasimos Germanakos (Greece)

25 March 1987 UEFA Euro 1988 qualifying	Netherlands	1–1	Greece	Rotterdam, Netherlands
	van Basten 5'		Saravakos 6'	Stadium: De Kuip; Attendance: 43.841; Referee: Carlo Longhi (Italy)

29 April 1987 UEFA Euro 1988 qualifying	Greece	1–0	Poland	Athens, Greece
	Saravakos 56'			Stadium: Olympic Stadium; Attendance: 68.324; Referee: Zoran Petrovic (Yugoslavia)

23 September 1987 Friendly	Soviet Union	3–0	Greece	Moscow, Soviet Union
	Dobrovolskiy 25'; Protasov 86'; Yaremchuk 88'			Stadium: Lenin Stadium; Attendance: 25.000; Referee: Laszlo Molnar (Hungary)

7 October 1987 Friendly	Romania	2–2	Greece	Bucharest, Romania
	Tarlea 72'; Bölöni 76'		Saravakos 31'; Xanthopoulos 63'	Stadium: Stadionul Național; Attendance: 12.000

14 October 1987 UEFA Euro 1988 qualifying	Hungary	3–0	Greece	Budapest, Hungary
	Détári 4'; Bognár 12'; Mészáros 15'			Stadium: Népstadion; Attendance: 18.000; Referee: Dieter Pauly (West Germany)

16 December 1987 UEFA Euro 1988 qualifying	Greece	0–3	Netherlands	Rhodes, Greece
			R. Koeman 19'; Gillhaus 76' 82'	Stadium: Diagoras Stadium; Attendance: 3.458; Referee: Keith Stuart Hackett (England)

=== 1988 ===
17 February 1988 Friendly	Greece	3–2	Northern Ireland	Athens, Greece
20:00 (UTC+2:00)	Manolas 61', 79'; Mitropoulos 89'	Report	Clarke 32', 76'	Stadium: Olympic Stadium; Attendance: 9,753; Referee: Zdravko Jokić (Yugoslavia)

23 March 1988 Friendly	Greece	0–4	Soviet Union	Athens, Greece
19:30 (UTC+2:00)		Report	Protasov 2', 49', 57'; Lytovchenko 17'	Stadium: Olympic Stadium; Attendance: 18,000; Referee: Manfred Neuner (West Germany)

6 April 1988 Friendly	Greece	2–2	Austria	Piraeus, Greece
19:30 (UTC+3:00)	Saravakos 2'; Skartados 25'	Report	Zsak 18'; Willfurth 58'	Stadium: Karaiskakis Stadium; Attendance: 6,000; Referee: Carlo Longhi (Italy)

19 May 1988 Friendly	Canada	0–1	Greece	Montreal, Canada
19:30 (UTC-4:00)		Report	Tsiolis 6'	Stadium: Complexe sportif Claude-Robillard; Attendance: 5,137; Referee: Pierluigi Magni (Italy)

21 May 1988 1988 Matthews Cup	Canada	0–3	Greece	Toronto, Canada
15:00 (UTC-4:00)		Report	Mitropoulos 26'; Anastopoulos 53', 72'	Stadium: Varsity Stadium; Attendance: 8,763; Referee: Pierluigi Magni (Italy)
Note: Nikos Anastopoulos set the goal scoring record for Greece (27 goals)

23 May 1988 1988 Matthews Cup	Chile	0–1	Greece	Toronto, Canada
		Report	Anastopoulos 61'	Stadium: Varsity Stadium; Attendance: 11,106; Referee: Tony Evangelista (Canada)

28 May 1988 1988 Matthews Cup Final	Canada	0–0 (4–2 p)	Greece	Toronto, Canada
		Report		Stadium: Varsity Stadium; Attendance: 10,531; Referee: Carlo Longhi (Italy)
	Penalties
	Catliff (penalty scored); Sweeney (penalty scored); Pignatiello (penalty scored); Limniatis (penalty missed); Gray (penalty scored)		Anastopoulos (penalty scored); Tsalouchidis (penalty scored); Sarganis (penalty missed); Kourbanas (penalty missed)

31 August 1988 Friendly	East Germany	1–0	Greece	East Berlin, East Germany
18:00 (UTC+2:00)	Sammer 24'	Report		Stadium: Friedrich-Ludwig-Jahn-Sportpark; Attendance: 6,500; Referee: Michał Listkiewicz (Poland)

21 September 1988 Friendly	Turkey	3–1	Greece	Istanbul, Turkey
16:00 (UTC+3:00)	Çolak 8' (pen.); Çetin 41'; Dilmen 63'	Report	Anastopoulos 39'	Stadium: BJK İnönü Stadium; Attendance: 30,593; Referee: Werner Föckler (West Germany)
Note: Nikos Anastopoulos set the goal scoring record for Greece (29 goals), which still stands today.

19 October 1988 1990 FIFA World Cup qualification	Greece	1–1	Denmark	Athens, Greece
(Report)	Mitropoulos 41'	Report	Povlsen 56'	Stadium: Olympic Stadium; Attendance: 19,349; Referee: Dušan Krchňák (Czechoslovakia)

2 November 1988 1990 FIFA World Cup qualification	Romania	3–0	Greece	Bucharest, Romania
	Mateuţ 26'; Hagi 40' (pen.); Sabău 84'	(Report)		Stadium: Steaua Stadium, Bucharest; Attendance: 15,000; Referee: Hubert Forstinger (Austria)

15 November 1988 Friendly	Greece	3–0	Hungary	Piraeus, Greece
18:00 (UTC+2:00)	Lagonidis 3'; Tsalouchidis 51', 53'	Report		Stadium: Karaiskakis Stadium; Attendance: 1,000; Referee: Manfred Roßner (East Germany)

=== 1989 ===
18 January 1989 Friendly	Albania	1–1	Greece	Tirana, Albania
15:00 (UTC+1:00)	Minga 19'	Report	Tsiantakis 54'	Stadium: Qemal Stafa Stadium; Attendance: 8,200; Referee: Plarent Kotherja (Albania)

25 January 1989 Friendly	Greece	1–2	Portugal	Athens, Greece
15:00 (UTC+2:00)	Borbokis 63'	Report	Nunes 6'; Paneira 65'	Stadium: Olympic Stadium; Attendance: 834; Referee: Tullio Lanese (Italy)

8 February 1989 Friendly	Greece	1–2	England	Athens, Greece
15:00 (UTC+2:00)	Saravakos 1' (pen.)	Report	Ikonomopoulos 8' (o.g.); Robson 79'	Stadium: Olympic Stadium; Attendance: 6,000; Referee: Heinz Holzmann

22 February 1989 Friendly	Greece	4–2	Norway	Athens, Greece
15:00 (UTC+2:00)	Samaras 37'; Vakalopoulos 55'; Tsalouchidis 57'; Saravakos 63'	Report	Bratseth 51'; Sørloth 65'	Stadium: Olympic Stadium; Attendance: 994; Referee: Brian Hill (England)

8 March 1989 Friendly	Greece	3–2	East Germany	Athens, Greece
15:00 (UTC+2:00)	Saravakos 21', 59'; Wahl 29' (o.g.)	Report	Halata 54'; Thom 66'	Stadium: Olympic Stadium; Attendance: 933; Referee: Carlo Longhi (Italy)

29 March 1989 Friendly	Greece	0–1	Turkey	Athens, Greece
20:00 (UTC+3:00)		Report	Dilmen 39'	Stadium: Olympic Stadium; Attendance: 4,242; Referee: Zdravko Jokić (Yugoslavia)

5 April 1989 Friendly	Greece	1–4	Yugoslavia	Athens, Greece
18:30 (UTC+3:00)	Mitropoulos 60'	Report	Vujović 22', 83'; Tuce 75'; Jakovljević 80'	Stadium: Olympic Stadium; Attendance: 2,000; Referee: Fritz Kaupe (Austria)

26 April 1989 1990 FIFA World Cup qualification	Greece	0–0	Romania	Athens, Greece
		(Report)		Stadium: Olympic Stadium; Attendance: 15,000; Referee: Aron Schmidhuber (West Germany)

17 May 1989 1990 FIFA World Cup qualification	Denmark	7–1	Greece	Copenhagen, Denmark
	B. Laudrup 24'; Bartram 47'; K. Nielsen 55'; Povlsen 56'; Vilfort 79'; Andersen 85'; M. Laudrup 89' (pen.)	(Report)	Mavridis 39'	Stadium: Idrætsparken; Attendance: 40,000; Referee: Keith Hackett (England)

23 August 1989 Friendly	Norway	0–0	Greece	Oslo, Norway
19:00 (UTC+2:00)		Report		Stadium: Ullevaal Stadion; Attendance: 3,696; Referee: Karl-Josef Assenmacher (West Germany)

5 September 1989 Friendly	Poland	3–0	Greece	Warsaw, Poland
16:15 (UTC+2:00)	Warzycha 2'; Dziekanowski 28'; Ziober 43'	Report		Stadium: Stadion Wojska Polskiego; Attendance: 15,000; Referee: Günther Habermann (East Germany)

20 September 1989 Friendly	Yugoslavia	3–0	Greece	Novi Sad, Yugoslavia
16:30 (UTC+2:00)	Brnović 8'; Prosinečki 16'; Pančev 83'	Report		Attendance: 7,000; Referee: Gábor Plasek (Hungary)

11 October 1989 1990 FIFA World Cup qualification	Bulgaria	4–0	Greece	Varna, Bulgaria
16:30 (UTC+2:00)	Ivanov 72'; Bankov 76'; Iskrenov 79'; Stoichkov 88'	(Report)		Stadium: Yuri Gagarin Stadium; Attendance: 15,000; Referee: Rolf Blattmann (Switzerland)

25 October 1989 Friendly	Hungary	1–1	Greece	Budapest, Hungary
17:30 (UTC+1:00)	Szekeres 47'	Report	Borbokis 52'	Stadium: Népstadion; Attendance: 4,000; Referee: Yaacov Scheiner (Israel)

15 November 1989 1990 FIFA World Cup qualification	Greece	1–0	Bulgaria	Athens, Greece
	Nioplias 49'	(Report)		Stadium: Olympic Stadium; Attendance: 1,500; Referee: Zoran Petrović (Yugoslavia

=== 1990 ===
17 January 1990 Friendly	Greece	2–0	Belgium	Athens, Greece
16:00	Tsalouchidis 58'; Apostolakis 90'	Report		Stadium: Olympic Stadium; Attendance: 1,000; Referee: Pietro D'Elia (Italy)

28 March 1990 Friendly	Greece	2–1	Israel	Athens, Greece
19:00	Manolas 64', 77'	Report	Sinai 76'	Stadium: Olympic Stadium; Attendance: 1,105; Referee: Vassilios Nikakis (Greece)

30 May 1990 Friendly	Italy	0–0	Greece	Perugia, Italy
20:30		Report		Stadium: Stadio Renato Curi; Attendance: 35,000; Referee: José Rosa dos Santos (Portugal)

5 September 1990 Friendly	Greece	1–0	Albania	Patras, Greece
19:45	Dimitriadis 48'	Report		Stadium: Panachaiki Stadium; Attendance: 4,500; Referee: Meletis Voutsaras (Greece)

10 October 1990 Friendly	Greece	6–1	Egypt	Athens, Greece
19:00	Tsalouchidis 45'; Saravakos 47', 79', 80', 88', 90+1'	Report	Abdelghani 69'	Stadium: Olympic Stadium; Attendance: 1,806; Referee: Lyube Spasov (Bulgaria)

31 October 1990 UEFA Euro 1992 qualifying	Greece	4–0	Malta	Athens, Greece
18:00	Tsiantakis 37'; Karapialis 40'; Saravakos 59'; Borbokis 88'	Report		Stadium: Olympic Stadium; Attendance: 7,768; Referee: Ion Crăciunescu (Romania)

21 November 1990 UEFA Euro 1992 qualifying	Netherlands	2–0	Greece	Rotterdam, Netherlands
20:00		Report	Bergkamp 7' van Basten 18'	Stadium: Stadion Feijenoord; Attendance: 20,233; Referee: Lajos Nemeth (Hungary)

19 December 1990 Friendly	Greece	1–2	Poland	Volos, Greece
16:15	Tsalouchidis 9'	Report	Soczyński 36'; Kosecki 68'	Stadium: Volos Municipal Stadium; Attendance: 2,507; Referee: Theodoros Kefalas (Greece)

=== 1991 ===
23 January 1991 UEFA Euro 1992 qualifying	Greece	3–2	Portugal	Athens, Greece
18:30 (UTC+2:00)	Borbokis 7'; Manolas 68'; Tsalouchidis 84'	Report	Águas 18'; Futre 62'	Stadium: Olympic Stadium; Attendance: 8,553; Referee: Carlo Longhi (Italy)

27 February 1991 Friendly	Cyprus	1–1	Greece	Limassol, Cyprus
	Nicolaou 48'	Report	Saravakos 9'	Stadium: Tsirion Stadium; Attendance: 1,625; Referee: Kyros Georgiou (Cyprus)

27 March 1991 Friendly	Morocco	0–0	Greece	Rabat, Morocco
15:00 (UTC+0:00)		Report		Stadium: Prince Moulay Abdellah Stadium; Attendance: 3,000; Referee: El Boulalhi (Morocco)

17 April 1991 Friendly	Greece	2–2	Sweden	Athens, Greece
19:00 (UTC+3:00)	Vonderburg 11' (o.g.); Borbokis 83'	Report	Erlingmark 21'; Mild 63'	Stadium: Nikos Goumas Stadium; Attendance: 3,900; Referee: Pierluigi Magni (Italy)

4 September 1991 Friendly	Greece	0–2	Albania	Athens, Greece
		Report	Kushta 37', 85'	Stadium: Olympic Stadium; Attendance: 4,000; Referee: (Greece) Vassilios Nikakis

9 October 1991 UEFA Euro 1992 qualifying	Finland	1–1	Greece	Helsinki, Finland
	Ukkonen 50'	Report	Tsalouchidis 73'	Stadium: Helsinki Olympic Stadium; Attendance: 5,225; Referee: Sergei Khusainov

30 October 1991 UEFA Euro 1992 qualifying	Greece	2–0	Finland	Athens, Greece
	Saravakos 50'; Borbokis 52'	Report		Stadium: Olympic Stadium; Attendance: 7,111; Referee: (Austria) Gerhard Kapl

20 November 1991 UEFA Euro 1992 qualifying	Portugal	1–0	Greece	Lisbon, Portugal
	Pinto 17'	Report		Stadium: Estádio da Luz; Attendance: 2,098; Referee: Alphonse Constantin

4 December 1991 UEFA Euro 1992 qualifying	Greece	0–2	Netherlands	Thessaloniki, Greece
		Report	Bergkamp 38'; Blind 87'	Stadium: Kaftanzoglio Stadium; Attendance: 25,053; Referee: Bo Karlsson (Sweden)

22 December 1991 UEFA Euro 1992 qualifying	Malta	1–1	Greece	Ta'Qali, Malta
	Sultana 42'	Report	Marinakis 67'	Stadium: National Stadium, Ta' Qali; Attendance: 8,110; Referee: Michel Girard

=== 1992 ===
29 January 1992 Friendly	Albania	1–0	Greece	Tirana, Albania
	Rraklli 41'	Report		Stadium: Qemal Stafa Stadium; Attendance: 8,000; Referee: Bujar Pregia

12 February 1992 Friendly	Greece	1–0	Romania	Ioannina, Greece
	Tsalouchidis 49'	Report		Stadium: Zosimades Stadium; Attendance: 5,000; Referee: (Greece) Vassilios Nikakis

25 March 1992 Friendly	Cyprus	1–3	Greece	Limassol, Cyprus
	Toursounidis 7'; Karapialis 32'	Report	Elia 84'	Stadium: Tsirion Stadium; Attendance: 2,500

13 May 1992 1994 FIFA World Cup qualification	Greece	1–0	Iceland	Athens, Greece
	Sofianopulos 28'	Report		Stadium: Olympic Stadium; Attendance: 10,000; Referee: Karl Josef Assenmacher

2 September 1992 Friendly	Greece	2–3	Cyprus	Thessaloniki, Greece
	Tsalouchidis 22'; Karapialis 78'	Report	Charalambous 5'; Sotiriou 37'; Andreou 85' (pen.)	Stadium: Kaftanzoglio Stadium; Attendance: 6,000

7 October 1992 1994 FIFA World Cup qualification	Iceland	0–1	Greece	Reykjavík, Iceland
		Report	Tsalouchidis 61'	Stadium: Laugardalsvöllur; Attendance: 6,350; Referee: Keith Burge

11 November 1992 1994 FIFA World Cup qualification	Greece	0–0	Hungary	Thessaloniki, Greece
		Report		Stadium: Kaftanzoglio Stadium; Attendance: 40,000; Referee: Philip Don (England)

=== 1993 ===
17 February 1993 1994 FIFA World Cup qualification	Greece	2–0	Luxembourg	Athens, Greece
	Dimitriadis 28' (pen.); Mitropoulos 65'	Report		Stadium: Olympic Stadium; Attendance: 36,224; Referee: Vaclav Krondl (Czech Republic)

10 March 1993 Friendly	Austria	2–1	Greece	Vienna, Austria
	Pfeifenberger 3'; Baur 13'	Report	Machlas 38'	Stadium: Ernst-Happel-Stadion; Attendance: 30,000

31 March 1993 1994 FIFA World Cup qualification	Hungary	0–1	Greece	Budapest, Hungary
		Report	Apostolakis 70' (pen.)	Stadium: Népstadion; Attendance: 30,000; Referee: Heinz Helmut Krug

23 May 1993 1994 FIFA World Cup qualification	Russia	1–1	Greece	Moscow, Russia
	Dobrovolski 76' (pen.)	Report	Mitropoulos 45'	Stadium: Luzhniki Stadium; Attendance: 40,000; Referee: Peter Mikkelsen

12 October 1993 1994 FIFA World Cup qualification	Luxembourg	1–3	Greece	Luxembourg City, Luxembourg
	Fanelli 82'	Report	Machlas 31'; Apostolakis 63'; Saravakos 71'	Stadium: Stade Josy Barthel; Attendance: 2,538; Referee: Andrew Waddell

17 November 1993 1994 FIFA World Cup qualification	Greece	1–0	Russia	Athens, Greece
	Machlas 68'	Report		Stadium: Olympic Stadium; Attendance: 40,151; Referee: Jean Fidele Diramba

=== 1994 ===
23 March 1994 Friendly	Greece	0–0	Poland	Thessaloniki, Greece
		Report		Stadium: Kaftanzoglio Stadium; Attendance: 10,000; Referee: Luben Angelov

27 April 1994 Friendly	Greece	5–1	Saudi Arabia	Athens, Greece
	Machlas 10', 45'; Alexoudis 47'; Kostis 89'; Toutziaris 90'	Report	Al-Jaber 59'	Stadium: Olympic Stadium; Referee: Gheorghe Constantin

9 May 1994 1994 Greece Tournament	Greece	0–3	Cameroon	Piraeus, Greece
		Report	Embe 26'; Tataw 45'; Loga 72'	Stadium: Karaiskakis Stadium; Attendance: 4,262; Referee: (Austria) Alfred Wieser

13 May 1994 1994 Greece Tournament	Greece	0–0	Bolivia	Piraeus, Greece
		Report		Stadium: Karaiskakis Stadium; Attendance: 2,661; Referee: (Austria) Alfred Wieser

17 May 1994 Friendly	England	5–0	Greece	London, England
	Anderton 24'; Beardsley 37'; Platt 44' (pen.), 55'; Shearer 65'	Report		Stadium: Wembley Stadium; Attendance: 23,659; Referee: James McCluskey

28 May 1994 Friendly	United States	1–1	Greece	New Haven, United States
	Klopas 45'	Report	Hantzidis 49'	Stadium: Yale Bowl; Attendance: 21,317; Referee: Benito Archundia

5 June 1994 Friendly	Colombia	2–0	Greece	East Rutherford, United States
	Gaviria 49'; Rincón 68'	Report		Stadium: Giants Stadium; Attendance: 73,511; Referee: Helder Dias

21 June 1994 1994 FIFA World Cup Group D	Argentina	4–0	Greece	Foxborough, United States
	Batistuta 2', 44', 90' (pen.); Maradona 60'	Report		Stadium: Foxboro Stadium; Attendance: 53,486; Referee: (United States) Arturo Angeles

26 June 1994 1994 FIFA World Cup Group D	Bulgaria	4–0	Greece	Chicago, United States
	Stoichkov 5' (pen.), 55' (pen.); Letchkov 66'; Borimirov 89'	Report		Stadium: Soldier Field; Attendance: 63,160; Referee: Ali Mohammed Bujsaim

30 June 1994 1994 FIFA World Cup Group D	Nigeria	2–0	Greece	Foxborough, United States
	George 45'; Amokachi 90'	Report		Stadium: Foxboro Stadium; Attendance: 53,001; Referee: Les Mottram

7 September 1994 UEFA Euro 1996 qualifying	Faroe Islands	1–5	Greece	Toftir, Faroe Islands
	Müller 88'	Report	Saravakos 11'; Tsalouchidis 18', 86'; Alexandris 55', 61'	Stadium: Svangaskard; Attendance: 2,412; Referee: Michel Piraux

12 October 1994 UEFA Euro 1996 qualifying	Greece	4–0	Finland	Thessaloniki, Greece
	Markos 23'; Batista Lima 70'; Machlas 76', 90'	Report		Stadium: Kaftanzoglio Stadium; Attendance: 7,704; Referee: Philippe Leduc

16 November 1994 UEFA Euro 1996 qualifying	Greece	2–0	San Marino	Athens, Greece
	Machlas 21'; Frantzeskos 84'	Report		Stadium: Olympic Stadium; Attendance: 2,859; Referee: Haim Lipkovitch

18 December 1994 UEFA Euro 1996 qualifying	Greece	1–0	Scotland	Athens, Greece
	Apostolakis 19' (pen.)	Report		Stadium: Olympic Stadium; Attendance: 7,976; Referee: John Blankenstein

=== 1995 ===
25 January 1995 Friendly	Cyprus	2–3	Greece	Larnaca, Cyprus
	Gogić 9'; Kalitzakis 27' (o.g.)	Report	Georgiadis 35'; Frantzeskos 71'; Vryzas 83'	Stadium: Antonis Papadopoulos Stadium; Attendance: 2,000; Referee: Andreas Georgiou

8 February 1995 Friendly	Greece	1–0	Romania	Kalamata, Greece
	Tsalouchidis 15'	Report		Stadium: Kalamata Municipal Stadium; Attendance: 6,000; Referee: Theodoros Kefalas

8 March 1995 Friendly	Greece	1–1	Switzerland	Athens, Greece
	Vryzas 49'	Report	Fernandez 9'	Stadium: Olympic Stadium; Attendance: 1,153; Referee: Zoran Petrović

26 April 1995 UEFA Euro 1996 qualifying	Greece	0–3	Russia	Thessaloniki, Greece
		Report	Nikiforov 36'; Zagorakis 78' (o.g.); Beschastnykh 79'	Stadium: Kaftanzoglio Stadium; Attendance: 29,616; Referee: Loris Stafoggia

17 May 1995 Friendly	Lithuania	2–1	Greece	Vilnius, Lithuania
	Maciulevičius 30'; Preikšaitis 58'	Report	Tsiartas 34'	Stadium: Lithuania National Stadium; Attendance: 1,500; Referee: Vadim Zhuk

11 June 1995 UEFA Euro 1996 qualifying	Finland	2–1	Greece	Helsinki, Finland
	Litmanen 45' (pen.); Hjelm 55'	Report	Nikolaidis 6'	Stadium: Helsingin Olympiastadion; Attendance: 10,550; Referee: Heinz Helmut Krug

16 August 1995 UEFA Euro 1996 qualifying	Scotland	1–0	Greece	Glasgow, Scotland
	McCoist 72'	Report		Stadium: Hampden Park; Attendance: 34,910; Referee: Peter Mikkelsen

6 September 1995 UEFA Euro 1996 qualifying	San Marino	0–4	Greece	Serravalle, San Marino
		Report	Tsalouchidis 5'; Georgiadis 31'; Alexandris 61'; Donis 81'	Stadium: Stadio Olimpico; Attendance: 886; Referee: (Slovenia) Milan Mitrovic

20 September 1995 Friendly	Greece	0–2	Yugoslavia	Thessaloniki, Greece
		Report	Curcic 55'; Milošević 85'	Stadium: Toumba Stadium; Attendance: 30,000; Referee: Stefan Ormandjiev

11 October 1995 UEFA Euro 1996 qualifying	Russia	2–1	Greece	Moscow, Russia
	Ouzounidis 35' (o.g.); Onopko 71'	Report	Tsalouchidis 64'	Stadium: Luzhniki Stadium; Attendance: 19,190; Referee: (Austria) Gerd Grabher

15 November 1995 UEFA Euro 1996 qualifying	Greece	5–0	Faroe Islands	Heraklion, Greece
	Alexandris 58'; Nikolaidis 62'; Machlas 66'; Donis 75'; Tsiartas 80'	Report		Stadium: Theodoros Vardinogiannis Stadium; Attendance: 9,088; Referee: Mitko Mitrev

=== 1996 ===
24 January 1996 Friendly	Greece	2–1	Israel	Chalcis, Greece
	Glam 27' (o.g.); Tsiartas 45' (pen.)	Report	Harazi 88'	Stadium: Municipal Stadium of Chalkida; Attendance: 4,000; Referee: (Greece) Vassilios Nikakis

21 February 1996 Friendly	France	3–1	Greece	Nîmes, France
	Loko 30', 46' (pen.); Zidane 49'	Report	Alexandris 4'	Stadium: Stade Des Costieres; Attendance: 23,452; Referee: Roger Philippi

27 March 1996 Friendly	Portugal	1–0	Greece	Lisbon, Portugal
	Oceano 87' (pen.)	Report		Stadium: Estádio do Restelo; Attendance: 8,500; Referee: Mike Reed

24 April 1996 1998 FIFA World Cup qualification	Greece	2–0	Slovenia	Athens, Greece
	Batista Lima 56'; Nikolaidis 66'	Report		Stadium: Olympic Stadium; Attendance: 5,053; Referee: Rune Pedersen

8 May 1996 Friendly	Greece	2–1	Georgia	Ioannina, Greece
	Nikolaidis 58', 87'	Report	Gogrichiani 15'	Stadium: Zosimades Stadium; Attendance: 13,000

14 August 1996 Friendly	Greece	2–1	Albania	Athens, Greece
	Nikolaidis 22'; Kostis 51'	Report	Pano 60'	Stadium: Olympic Stadium; Attendance: 1,300; Referee: (Greece) Sotirios Vorgias

1 September 1996 1998 FIFA World Cup qualification	Greece	3–0	Bosnia and Herzegovina	Kalamata, Greece
	Ouzounidis 41'; Apostolakis 77'; Nikolaidis 83'	Report		Stadium: Kalamata Municipal Stadium; Attendance: 4,088; Referee: (Austria) Günther Benkö

9 October 1996 1998 FIFA World Cup qualification	Denmark	2–1	Greece	Copenhagen, Denmark
	Zagorakis 25' (o.g.); Laudrup 52'	Report	Donis 35'	Stadium: Københavns Idrætspark; Attendance: 40,226; Referee: Durcan Durcan

10 November 1996 1998 FIFA World Cup qualification	Croatia	1–1	Greece	Zagreb, Croatia
	Suker 45'	Report	Nikolaidis 9'	Stadium: Stadion Maksimir; Attendance: 30,000; Referee: Marlo van der Ende

=== 1997 ===
22 January 1997 Friendly	Israel	1–1	Greece	Jerusalem, Israel
	Zohar 57'	Report	Kostis 9'	Stadium: Ramat Gan Stadium; Attendance: 5,000; Referee: Abraham Klein

19 February 1997 Friendly	Greece	0–0	Portugal	Athens, Greece
		Report		Stadium: Nikos Goumas Stadium; Attendance: 10,000; Referee: Aron Husu

12 March 1997 Friendly	Cyprus	0–4	Greece	Paralimni, Cyprus
		Report	Georgiadis 12'; Kostis 44'; Frantzeskos 53'; Alexandris 63'	Stadium: Paralimni Stadium; Attendance: 1,000; Referee: Andreas Georgiou

2 April 1997 1998 FIFA World Cup qualification	Bosnia and Herzegovina	0–1	Greece	Sarajevo, Bosnia and Herzegovina
		Report	Frantzeskos 74'	Stadium: Kosovo Stadium; Attendance: 30,000; Referee: Alain Sars

30 April 1997 1998 FIFA World Cup qualification	Greece	0–1	Croatia	Thessaloniki, Greece
		Report	Suker 74'	Stadium: Kaftanzoglio Stadium; Attendance: 35,000; Referee: Antonio Lopez Nieto

19 August 1997 Friendly	Greece	2–1	Cyprus	Heraklion, Greece
	Machlas 21'; Gonias 74' (pen.)	Report	Malekos 10'	Stadium: Theodoros Vardinogiannis Stadium; Attendance: 5,000; Referee: Spiridon Papadakos

6 September 1997 1998 FIFA World Cup qualification	Slovenia	0–3	Greece	Ljubljana, Slovenia
		Report	Alexandris 53'; Konstantinidis 89'; Machlas 90'	Attendance: 3,500; Referee: Karol Ihring

11 October 1997 1998 FIFA World Cup qualification	Greece	0–0	Denmark	Athens, Greece
		Report		Stadium: Olympic Stadium; Attendance: 64,272; Referee: (France) Gilles Veissiere

=== 1998 ===
18 February 1998 Friendly	Greece	1–1	Russia	Athens, Greece
	Frantzeskos 9'	Report	Kolyvanov 65'	Stadium: Olympic Stadium; Attendance: 1,000; Referee: Pasquale Rodomonti

8 April 1998 Friendly	Romania	2–1	Greece	Bucharest, Romania
	Moldovan 62'; Barbu 80'	Report	Alexandris 83'	Attendance: 9,000; Referee: Hartmut Strampe

6 September 1998 UEFA Euro 2000 qualifying	Greece	2–2	Slovenia	Athens, Greece
	Machlas 55' (pen.); Frantzeskos 58'	Report	Zahovič 19', 72'	Stadium: Olympic Stadium; Attendance: 28,904; Referee: (Italy) Alfredo Trentalange

14 October 1998 UEFA Euro 2000 qualifying	Greece	3–0	Georgia	Athens, Greece
	Machlas 13'; Liberopoulos 15'; Ouzounidis 36'	Report		Stadium: Olympic Stadium; Attendance: 12,681; Referee: (Bulgaria) Atanas Uzunov

18 November 1998 UEFA Euro 2000 qualifying	Albania	0–0	Greece	Tirana, Albania
		Report		Stadium: Qemal Stafa Stadium; Attendance: 15,000; Referee: Esquinas Torres

=== 1999 ===
3 February 1999 1999 Cyprus International Tournament	Finland	1–2	Greece	Larnaca, Cyprus
	Kaijasilta 63'	Report	Nikolaidis 65' (pen.); Georgatos 82'	Stadium: GSZ Stadium; Attendance: 3,000

5 February 1999 1999 Cyprus International Tournament	Belgium	0–1	Greece	Larnaca, Cyprus
		Report	Giannakopoulos 63'	Stadium: GSZ Stadium; Attendance: 2,000; Referee: (Cyprus) Yiannais Kiprianidis

10 March 1999 Friendly	Greece	3–2	Croatia	Athens, Greece
	Giannakopoulos 12', 55'; Nikolaidis 86'	Report	Vlaović 68'; Suker 80' (pen.)	Stadium: Olympic Stadium; Attendance: 10,000; Referee: Juan Ansuategui Roca

27 March 1999 UEFA Euro 2000 qualifying	Greece	0–2	Norway	Athens, Greece
		Report	Solskjær 37', 87'	Stadium: Olympic Stadium; Attendance: 42,572; Referee: Leslie Irvine

31 March 1999 UEFA Euro 2000 qualifying	Latvia	0–0	Greece	Riga, Latvia
		Report		Stadium: Daugava National Stadium; Attendance: 4,300; Referee: Knud Erik Fisker

28 April 1999 Friendly	Greece	1–1	Switzerland	Athens, Greece
	Georgatos 57'	Report	Haas 20'	Stadium: Olympic Stadium; Attendance: 10,000

5 June 1999 UEFA Euro 2000 qualifying	Georgia	1–2	Greece	Tbilisi, Georgia
	Ketsbaia 54'	Report	Frantzeskos 86'; Machlas 90'	Stadium: Boris Paichadze Stadium; Attendance: 7,400; Referee: William Young

9 June 1999 UEFA Euro 2000 qualifying	Greece	1–2	Latvia	Athens, Greece
	Niniadis 39'	Report	Verpakovskis 24'; Zemļinskis 90' (pen.)	Stadium: Olympic Stadium; Attendance: 15,135; Referee: Lubomir Pucek

16 August 1999 Friendly	Greece	3–2	Mexico	Xanthi, Greece
	Niniadis 21'; Mavrogenidis 60'; Georgatos 70'	Report	Márquez 48'; Rojas 50'	Stadium: Xanthi Ground; Attendance: 5,000; Referee: Guetsov Guetsov

18 August 1999 Friendly	Greece	3–1	El Salvador	Kavala, Greece
	Liberopoulos 20', 86'; Katsabis 90'		García 52' (pen.)	Stadium: National Stadion; Attendance: 2,500; Referee: (England) Graham Barber

20 August 1999 Friendly	Greece	3–0	El Salvador	Kavala, Greece
	Basinas 40'; Liberopoulos 50'; Liolidis 81'	Report		Stadium: Anthi Karagianni Stadium; Attendance: 2,5000

4 September 1999 UEFA Euro 2000 qualifying	Norway	1–0	Greece	Oslo, Greece
	Leonhardsen 34'	Report		Stadium: Ullevaal Stadion; Attendance: 24,133; Referee: (Germany) Markus Merk

6 October 1999 UEFA Euro 2000 qualifying	Greece	2–0	Albania	Athens, Greece
	Tsiartas 1'; Georgiadis 87'	Report		Stadium: Olympic Stadium; Attendance: 8,452; Referee: (Russia) Valentin Ivanov

9 October 1999 UEFA Euro 2000 qualifying	Slovenia	0–3	Greece	Maribor, Slovenia
		Report	Tsiartas 39'; Georgatos 43'; Nikolaidis 80'	Stadium: Ljudski vrt Stadion; Attendance: 2,500; Referee: (Egypt) Gamal Al-Ghandour

13 November 1999 Friendly	Greece	2–0	Nigeria	Kilkis, Greece
	Machlas 24', 61'	Report		Stadium: Municipal Stadium of Kilkis; Attendance: 4,000

17 November 1999 Friendly	Greece	1–0	Bulgaria	Kozani, Greece
	Kyparissis 61'	Report		Stadium: Kozani Stadium; Attendance: 6,000

14 December 1999 Friendly	Greece	1–1	Ghana	Thessaloniki, Greece
	Kyparissis 12'	Report	Akunnor 41'	Stadium: Kaftanzoglio Stadium; Attendance: 10,000

16 December 1999 Friendly	Greece	2–0	Moldova	Larissa, Greece
	Georgiadis 61'; Frantzeskos 63'	Report		Stadium: Alcazar Stadium; Attendance: 10,000; Referee: Orhan Erdemir

18 December 1999 Friendly	Greece	2–2	Estonia	Trikala, Greece
	Georgiadis 15'; Liberopoulos 49' (pen.)	Report	Oper 17', 38'	Stadium: National Stadium of Trikala; Attendance: 11,000; Referee: Bruno Derrien
