= Albania national football team results (1970–1999) =

This page details the match results and statistics of the Albania national football team from 1970 to 1999.

== Key ==
Key to matches

- Att.=Match attendance
- (H)=Home ground
- (A)=Away ground
- (N)=Neutral ground

Key to record by opponent

- Pld=Games played
- W=Games won
- D=Games drawn
- L=Games lost
- GF=Goals for
- GA=Goals against

== Results ==
Albania's score is shown first in each case.

| No. | Date | Venue | Opponents | Score | Competition | Albania scorers | Att. | Ref. |
|---|---|---|---|---|---|---|---|---|
| 38 | 14 October 1970 | Stadion Śląski, Chorzów (A) | Poland | 0–3 | UEFA Euro 1972 qualifying | | 8,507 | |
| 39 | 13 December 1970 | Mithatpaşa Stadium, Istanbul (A) | Turkey | 1–2 | UEFA Euro 1972 qualifying | Ziu 22' | 39,000 | |
| 40 | 17 February 1971 | Qemal Stafa Stadium, Tirana (H) | West Germany | 0–1 | UEFA Euro 1972 qualifying | | 18,082 | |
| 41 | 18 April 1971 | Stadionul Republicii, Bucharest (A) | Romania | 1–2 (Note: Match considered official by Albania but not by their opponents.) | 1972 Summer Olympics qualifier | Zhega 55' | 9,000 | |
| 42 | 12 May 1971 | Qemal Stafa Stadium, Tirana (H) | Poland | 1–1 | UEFA Euro 1972 qualifying | Zhega 32' | 18,812 | |
| 43 | 26 May 1971 | Qemal Stafa Stadium, Tirana (H) | Romania | 1–2 | 1972 Summer Olympics qualifier | Pano 29' | 25,000 | |
| 44 | 12 June 1971 | Wildparkstadion, Karlsruhe (A) | West Germany | 0–2 | UEFA Euro 1972 qualifying | | 44,833 | |
| 45 | 14 November 1971 | Qemal Stafa Stadium, Tirana (H) | Turkey | 3–0 | UEFA Euro 1972 qualifying | Pernaska 22', 55', Pano 60' | 18,159 | |
| 46 | 21 June 1972 | Helsinki Olympic Stadium, Helsinki (A) | Finland | 0–1 | 1974 FIFA World Cup qualification | | 1,431 | |
| 47 | 29 October 1972 | Stadionul 23 August, Bucharest (A) | Romania | 0–2 | 1974 FIFA World Cup qualification | | 21,109 | |
| 48 | 7 April 1973 | Ernst Grube Stadium, Magdeburg (A) | East Germany | 0–2 | 1974 FIFA World Cup qualification | | 17,140 | |
| 49 | 6 May 1973 | Qemal Stafa Stadium, Tirana (H) | Romania | 1–4 | 1974 FIFA World Cup qualification | Bizi 87' | 18,049 | |
| 50 | 10 October 1973 | Qemal Stafa Stadium, Tirana (H) | Finland | 1–0 | 1974 FIFA World Cup qualification | Rragami 25' (pen.) | 16,581 | |
| 51 | 3 November 1973 | Qemal Stafa Stadium, Tirana (H) | East Germany | 1–4 | 1974 FIFA World Cup qualification | Gjika 16' | 16,157 | |
| 52 | 7 November 1973 | Qemal Stafa Stadium, Tirana (H) | China | 1–1 | Friendly | Pano 67' | 15,000 | |
| 53 | 10 October 1976 | Qemal Stafa Stadium, Tirana (H) | Algeria | 3–0 | Friendly | Ballgjini 30', Pernaska 35', 80' | 15,000 | |
| 54 | 3 September 1980 | Qemal Stafa Stadium, Tirana (H) | Finland | 2–0 | 1982 FIFA World Cup qualification | Braho 2', Baçi 18' | 25,000 | |
| 55 | 19 October 1980 | Vasil Levski National Stadium, Sofia (A) | Bulgaria | 1–2 | 1982 FIFA World Cup qualification | Pernaska 69' | 16,000 | |
| 56 | 15 November 1980 | Praterstadion, Vienna (A) | Austria | 0–5 | 1982 FIFA World Cup qualification | | 31,000 | |
| 57 | 6 December 1980 | Qemal Stafa Stadium, Tirana (H) | Austria | 0–1 | 1982 FIFA World Cup qualification | | 30,000 | |
| 58 | 1 April 1981 | Qemal Stafa Stadium, Tirana (H) | West Germany | 0–2 | 1982 FIFA World Cup qualification | | 19,203 | |
| 59 | 2 September 1981 | Arto Tolsa Areena, Kotka (A) | Finland | 1–2 | 1982 FIFA World Cup qualification | Targaj 47' (pen.) | 6,830 | |
| 60 | 14 October 1981 | Qemal Stafa Stadium, Tirana (H) | Bulgaria | 0–2 | 1982 FIFA World Cup qualification | | 19,213 | |
| 61 | 18 November 1981 | Westfalenstadion, Dortmund (A) | West Germany | 0–8 | 1982 FIFA World Cup qualification | | 40,000 | |
| 62 | 22 September 1982 | Gerhard-Hanappi-Stadion, Vienna (A) | Austria | 0–5 | UEFA Euro 1984 qualifying | | 7,000 | |
| 63 | 27 October 1982 | İzmir Atatürk Stadium, İzmir (A) | Turkey | 0–1 | UEFA Euro 1984 qualifying | | 27,702 | |
| 64 | 15 December 1982 | Qemal Stafa Stadium, Tirana (H) | Northern Ireland | 0–0 | UEFA Euro 1984 qualifying | | 25,000 | |
| 65 | 30 March 1983 | Qemal Stafa Stadium, Tirana (H) | West Germany | 1–2 | UEFA Euro 1984 qualifying | Targaj 81' (pen.) | 25,000 | |
| 66 | 27 April 1983 | Windsor Park, Belfast (A) | Northern Ireland | 0–1 | UEFA Euro 1984 qualifying | | 12,000 | |
| 67 | 11 May 1983 | Qemal Stafa Stadium, Tirana (H) | Turkey | 1–1 | UEFA Euro 1984 qualifying | Çetiner 73' (o.g.) | 25,000 | |
| 68 | 8 June 1983 | Qemal Stafa Stadium, Tirana (H) | Austria | 1–2 | UEFA Euro 1984 qualifying | Targaj 83' | 15,139 | |
| 69 | 20 November 1983 | Ludwigsparkstadion, Saarbrucken (A) | West Germany | 1–2 | UEFA Euro 1984 qualifying | Tomorri 22' | 40,000 | |
| 70 | 17 October 1984 | King Baudouin Stadium, Brussels (A) | Belgium | 1–3 | 1986 FIFA World Cup qualification | Omuri 72' | 11,000 | |
| 71 | 31 October 1984 | Stadion Stali Mielec, Mielec (A) | Poland | 2–2 | 1986 FIFA World Cup qualification | Minga 54', Kola 76' | 25,000 | |
| 72 | 22 December 1984 | Qemal Stafa Stadium, Tirana (H) | Belgium | 2–0 | 1986 FIFA World Cup qualification | Josa 70', Minga 85' | 20,000 | |
| 73 | 27 February 1985 | Olympic Stadium, Athens (A) | Greece | 0–2 | 1986 FIFA World Cup qualification | | 26,000 | |
| 74 | 28 March 1985 | Qemal Stafa Stadium, Tirana (H) | Turkey | 0–0 | Friendly | | 15,000 | |
| 75 | 30 May 1985 | Qemal Stafa Stadium, Tirana (H) | Poland | 0–1 | 1986 FIFA World Cup qualification | | 20,000 | |
| 76 | 30 October 1985 | Qemal Stafa Stadium, Tirana (H) | Greece | 1–1 | 1986 FIFA World Cup qualification | Omuri 26' | 17,000 | |
| 77 | 15 October 1986 | Liebenauer Stadium, Graz (A) | Austria | 0–3 | UEFA Euro 1988 qualifying | | 8,000 | |
| 78 | 3 December 1986 | Qemal Stafa Stadium, Tirana (H) | Spain | 1–2 | UEFA Euro 1988 qualifying | Muça 27' | 20,000 | |
| 79 | 25 March 1987 | Stadionul Steaua, Bucharest (A) | Romania | 1–5 | UEFA Euro 1988 qualifying | Muça 35' | 6,500 | |
| 80 | 29 April 1987 | Qemal Stafa Stadium, Tirana (H) | Austria | 0–1 | UEFA Euro 1988 qualifying | | 17,250 | |
| 81 | 28 October 1987 | Flamurtari Stadium, Vlorë (H) | Romania | 0–1 | UEFA Euro 1988 qualifying | | 15,000 | |
| 82 | 18 November 1987 | Estadio Benito Villamarín, Seville (A) | Spain | 0–5 | UEFA Euro 1988 qualifying | | 45,299 | |
| 83 | 6 August 1988 | Tomori Stadium, Berat (H) | Cuba | 0–0 | Friendly | | 4,000 | |
| 84 | 20 September 1988 | Stadionul Farul, Constanta (A) | Romania | 0–3 | Friendly | | 4,000 | |
| 85 | 19 October 1988 | Stadion Śląski, Chorzów (A) | Poland | 0–1 | 1990 FIFA World Cup qualification | | 30,000 | |
| 86 | 5 November 1988 | Qemal Stafa Stadium, Tirana (H) | Sweden | 1–2 | 1990 FIFA World Cup qualification | Shehu 33' | 20,000 | |
| 87 | 18 January 1989 | Qemal Stafa Stadium, Tirana (H) | Greece | 1–1 | Friendly | Minga 19' | 8,200 | |
| 88 | 8 March 1989 | Qemal Stafa Stadium, Tirana (H) | England | 0–2 | 1990 FIFA World Cup qualification | | 25,000 | |
| 89 | 26 April 1989 | Wembley Stadium, London (A) | England | 0–5 | 1990 FIFA World Cup qualification | | 60,602 | |
| 90 | 8 October 1989 | Råsunda Stadion, Solna (A) | Sweden | 1–3 | 1990 FIFA World Cup qualification | Kushta 8' (pen.) | 32,423 | |
| 91 | 15 November 1989 | Qemal Stafa Stadium, Tirana (H) | Poland | 1–2 | 1990 FIFA World Cup qualification | Kushta 63' | 10,000 | |
| 92 | 30 May 1990 | Laugardalsvöllur, Reykjavík (A) | Iceland | 0–2 | UEFA Euro 1992 qualifying | | 6,500 | |
| 93 | 5 September 1990 | Pampeloponnisiako Stadium, Patras (A) | Greece | 0–1 | Friendly | | 4,500 | |
| 94 | 17 November 1990 | Qemal Stafa Stadium, Tirana (H) | France | 0–1 | UEFA Euro 1992 qualifying | | 12,972 | |
| 95 | 19 December 1990 | Ramón Sánchez Pizjuán Stadium, Seville (A) | Spain | 0–9 | UEFA Euro 1992 qualifying | | 12,625 | |
| 96 | 30 March 1991 | Parc des Princes, Paris (A) | France | 0–5 | UEFA Euro 1992 qualifying | | 24,181 | |
| 97 | 1 May 1991 | Qemal Stafa Stadium, Tirana (H) | Czechoslovakia | 0–2 | UEFA Euro 1992 qualifying | | 5,000 | |
| 98 | 26 May 1991 | Qemal Stafa Stadium, Tirana (H) | Iceland | 1–0 | UEFA Euro 1992 qualifying | Abazi 56' | 5,000 | |
| 99 | 4 September 1991 | Olympic Stadium, Athens (A) | Greece | 2–0 | Friendly | Kushta 37', 85' | 907 | |
| 100 | 16 October 1991 | Andrův stadion, Olomouc (A) | Czechoslovakia | 1–2 | UEFA Euro 1992 qualifying | Zmijani 60' | 2,366 | |
| 101 | 29 January 1992 | Qemal Stafa Stadium, Tirana (H) | Greece | 1–0 | Friendly | Rrakilli 43' | 7,000 | |
| 102 | 22 April 1992 | Estadio Benito Villamarín, Seville (A) | Spain | 0–3 | 1994 FIFA World Cup qualification | | 10,000 | |
| 103 | 26 May 1992 | Lansdowne Road, Dublin (A) | Republic of Ireland | 0–2 | 1994 FIFA World Cup qualification | | 29,727 | |
| 104 | 3 June 1992 | Qemal Stafa Stadium, Tirana (H) | Lithuania | 1–0 | 1994 FIFA World Cup qualification | Abazi 78' | 12,000 | |
| 105 | 9 September 1992 | Windsor Park, Belfast (A) | Northern Ireland | 0–3 | 1994 FIFA World Cup qualification | | 8,000 | |
| 106 | 11 November 1992 | Qemal Stafa Stadium, Tirana (H) | Latvia | 1–1 | 1994 FIFA World Cup qualification | Kepa 67' | 7,000 | |
| 107 | 17 February 1993 | Qemal Stafa Stadium, Tirana (H) | Northern Ireland | 1–2 | 1994 FIFA World Cup qualification | Rraklli 89' | 7,000 | |
| 108 | 14 April 1993 | Žalgiris Stadium, Vilnius (A) | Lithuania | 1–3 | 1994 FIFA World Cup qualification | Demollari 86' | 7,000 | |
| 109 | 15 May 1993 | Daugava Stadium, Riga (A) | Latvia | 0–0 | 1994 FIFA World Cup qualification | | 1,810 | |
| 110 | 26 May 1993 | Qemal Stafa Stadium, Tirana (H) | Republic of Ireland | 1–2 | 1994 FIFA World Cup qualification | Kushta 8' | 9,000 | |
| 111 | 2 June 1993 | Idraetsparken, Copenhagen (A) | Denmark | 0–4 | 1994 FIFA World Cup qualification | | 39,503 | |
| 112 | 8 September 1993 | Qemal Stafa Stadium, Tirana (H) | Denmark | 0–1 | 1994 FIFA World Cup qualification | | 8,000 | |
| 113 | 22 September 1993 | Qemal Stafa Stadium, Tirana (H) | Spain | 1–5 | 1994 FIFA World Cup qualification | Kushta 40' | 3,000 | |
| 114 | 14 May 1994 | Gradski stadion, Tetovo (A) | Macedonia | 1–5 | Friendly | Rraklli 49' | 5,000 | |
| 115 | 7 September 1994 | Cardiff Arms Park, Cardiff (A) | Wales | 0–2 | UEFA Euro 1996 qualifying | | 15,791 | |
| 116 | 16 November 1994 | Qemal Stafa Stadium, Tirana (H) | Germany | 1–2 | UEFA Euro 1996 qualifying | Zmijani 32' | 23,000 | |
| 117 | 14 December 1994 | Qemal Stafa Stadium, Tirana (H) | Georgia | 0–1 | UEFA Euro 1996 qualifying | | 15,000 | |
| 118 | 18 December 1994 | Fritz-Walter-Stadion, Kaiserslautern (A) | Germany | 1–2 | UEFA Euro 1996 qualifying | Rraklli 58' | 20,310 | |
| 119 | 29 March 1995 | Qemal Stafa Stadium, Tirana (H) | Moldova | 3–0 | UEFA Euro 1996 qualifying | Kushta 32' 78', Kaçaj 73' | 8,500 | |
| 120 | 26 April 1995 | Boris Paichadze National Stadium, Tbilisi (A) | Georgia | 0–2 | UEFA Euro 1996 qualifying | | 25,000 | |
| 121 | 7 June 1995 | Stadionul Republican, Chișinău (A) | Moldova | 3–2 | UEFA Euro 1996 qualifying | Kushta 7', Bellaj 16', Vata 72' | 7,000 | |
| 122 | 16 August 1995 | National Stadium, Ta' Qali (A) | Malta | 1–2 | Friendly | Bushi 72' | 1,500 | |
| 123 | 6 September 1995 | Qemal Stafa Stadium, Tirana (H) | Bulgaria | 1–1 | UEFA Euro 1996 qualifying | Rraklli 16' | 6,050 | |
| 124 | 7 October 1995 | Vasil Levski National Stadium, Sofia (A) | Bulgaria | 0–3 | UEFA Euro 1996 qualifying | | 35,000 | |
| 125 | 15 November 1995 | Qemal Stafa Stadium, Tirana (H) | Wales | 1–1 | UEFA Euro 1996 qualifying | Kushta 5' (pen.) | 5,000 | |
| 126 | 30 November 1995 | Qemal Stafa Stadium, Tirana (H) | Bosnia and Herzegovina | 2–0 | Friendly | Qendro 30', Dobi 50' | 10,000 | |
| 127 | 24 April 1996 | Bilino Polje Stadium, Zenica (A) | Bosnia and Herzegovina | 0–0 | Friendly | | 15,000 | |
| 128 | 14 August 1996 | Spyros Louis Stadium, Athens (A) | Greece | 1–2 | Friendly | Pano 60' | 1,300 | |
| 129 | 9 October 1996 | Qemal Stafa Stadium, Tirana (H) | Portugal | 0–3 | 1998 FIFA World Cup qualification | | 16,000 | |
| 130 | 9 November 1996 | Qemal Stafa Stadium, Tirana (H) | Armenia | 1–1 | 1998 FIFA World Cup qualification | Fraholli 57' | 7,000 | |
| 131 | 14 December 1996 | Windsor Park, Belfast (A) | Northern Ireland | 0–2 | 1998 FIFA World Cup qualification | | 7,935 | |
| 132 | 29 March 1997 | Nuevo Estadio de Los Cármenes, Granada (H) | Ukraine | 0–1 | 1998 FIFA World Cup qualification | | 9,395 | |
| 133 | 2 April 1997 | Nuevo Estadio de Los Cármenes, Granada (H) | Germany | 2–3 | 1998 FIFA World Cup qualification | Kola 61' (pen.), 89' (pen.) | 9,780 | |
| 134 | 7 June 1997 | Estádio das Antas, Porto (A) | Portugal | 0–2 | 1998 FIFA World Cup qualification | | 25,000 | |
| 135 | 20 August 1997 | Olimpiyskyi, Kyiv (A) | Ukraine | 0–1 | 1998 FIFA World Cup qualification | | 38,000 | |
| 136 | 6 September 1997 | Hrazdan Stadium, Yerevan (A) | Armenia | 0–3 | 1998 FIFA World Cup qualification | | 5,000 | |
| 137 | 10 September 1997 | Hardturm, Zurich (H) | Northern Ireland | 1–0 | 1998 FIFA World Cup qualification | Haxhi 69' | 2,650 | |
| 138 | 11 October 1997 | Niedersachsenstadion, Hannover (A) | Germany | 3–4 | 1998 FIFA World Cup qualification | Kohler 54' o.g., Tare 80', Vata 88' | 44,522 | |
| 139 | 21 January 1998 | Antalya Atatürk Stadium, Antalya (A) | Turkey | 4–1 | Friendly | Rraklli 14', 65', Bushi 67', Halili 87' | 20,000 | |
| 140 | 6 February 1998 | National Stadium, Ta' Qali (N) | Malta | 1–1 | 1998 Malta International Football Tournament | Shulku 84' (pen.) | 3,000 | |
| 141 | 8 February 1998 | National Stadium, Ta' Qali (N) | Georgia | 0–3 | 1998 Malta International Football Tournament | | 750 | |
| 142 | 10 February 1998 | National Stadium, Ta' Qali (N) | Latvia | 2–2 | 1998 Malta International Football Tournament | Kola 45' (pen.), 47' | 2,500 | |
| 143 | 19 August 1998 | Makario Stadium, Nicosia (A) | Cyprus | 2–3 | Friendly | Haxhi 56', Bushi 57' | 6,500 | |
| 144 | 5 September 1998 | Boris Paichadze National Stadium, Tbilisi (A) | Georgia | 0–1 | UEFA Euro 2000 qualifying | | 35,000 | |
| 145 | 14 October 1998 | Ullevaal Stadion, Oslo (A) | Norway | 2–2 | UEFA Euro 2000 qualifying | Bushi 37', Tare 52' | 17,770 | |
| 146 | 18 November 1998 | Qemal Stafa Stadium, Tirana (H) | Greece | 0–0 | UEFA Euro 2000 qualifying | | 18,670 | |
| 147 | 10 February 1999 | Qemal Stafa Stadium, Tirana (H) | Macedonia | 2–0 | Friendly | Vata 48', Bogdani 90' | 6,000 | |
| 148 | 28 April 1999 | Daugava Stadium, Riga (A) | Latvia | 0–0 | UEFA Euro 2000 qualifying | | 2,700 | |
| 149 | 5 June 1999 | Qemal Stafa Stadium, Tirana (H) | Norway | 1–2 | UEFA Euro 2000 qualifying | Tare 17' | 5,000 | |
| 150 | 9 June 1999 | Qemal Stafa Stadium, Tirana (H) | Slovenia | 0–1 | UEFA Euro 2000 qualifying | | 8,000 | |
| 151 | 18 August 1999 | Bežigrad Stadium, Ljubljana (A) | Slovenia | 0–2 | UEFA Euro 2000 qualifying | | 8,000 | |
| 152 | 4 September 1999 | Qemal Stafa Stadium, Tirana (H) | Latvia | 3–3 | UEFA Euro 2000 qualifying | Bushi 29', 78', Muka 90' | 4,000 | |
| 153 | 6 October 1999 | Olympic Stadium, Athens (A) | Greece | 0–2 | UEFA Euro 2000 qualifying | | 8,452 | |
| 154 | 9 October 1999 | Qemal Stafa Stadium, Tirana (H) | Georgia | 2–1 | UEFA Euro 2000 qualifying | Rraklli 30', Kola 36' | 3,000 | |
