= UEFA Euro 1988 qualifying Group 5 =

Football tournament qualification stage

The UEFA Euro 1988 qualifying Group 5 was one of the seven qualifying groups to determine which teams would compete at the UEFA Euro 1988 finals tournament. Group 5 consisted of five teams: Netherlands, Greece, Hungary, Poland, and Cyprus, where they played against each other home-and-away in a round-robin format, with the top team qualifying for the final tournament. The Netherlands won the group and qualified for the finals, finishing five points clear of Greece.

== Standings ==
Pos	Team	Pld	W	D	L	GF	GA	GD	Pts	Qualification	(Netherlands)	(Greece)	(Hungary)	(Poland)	(Cyprus)
1	Netherlands	8	6	2	0	15	1	+14	14	Qualify for final tournament	—	1–1	2–0	0–0	4–0 (Note: The Netherlands v Cyprus match originally finished as an 8–0 win for the Netherlands, but the match was marred by crowd violence. Therefore the result was annulled and the match was ordered to be replayed behind closed doors.)
2	Greece	8	4	1	3	12	13	−1	9		0–3	—	2–1	1–0	3–1
3	Hungary	8	4	0	4	13	11	+2	8		0–1	3–0	—	5–3	1–0
4	Poland	8	3	2	3	9	11	−2	8		0–2	2–1	3–2	—	0–0
5	Cyprus	8	0	1	7	3	16	−13	1		0–2	2–4	0–1	0–1	—

Source: UEFA
Rules for classification: Qualification tiebreakers

== Matches ==
15 October 1986

Poland	2–1	Greece
Dziekanowski 4' (pen.), 39' (pen.)	(Details)	Anastopoulos 12'

Stadion Miejski, Poznań
Attendance: 23,000
Referee: Emilio Soriano Aladrén (Spain)
15 October 1986

Hungary	0–1	Netherlands
	(Details)	Van Basten 67'

Népstadion, Budapest
Attendance: 13,897
Referee: Bruno Galler (Switzerland)

12 November 1986

Greece	2–1	Hungary
Mitropoulos 38'; Anastopoulos 65'	(Details)	Boda 73'

Olympic Stadium, Athens
Attendance: 27,760
Referee: Velodi Miminoshvili (Soviet Union)

19 November 1986

Netherlands	0–0	Poland
	(Details)

Olympic Stadium, Amsterdam
Attendance: 52,750
Referee: Joël Quiniou (France)

3 December 1986

Cyprus	2–4	Greece
Christofi 28'; Savvidis 41'	(Details)	Antoniou 14'; L. Papaioannou 48'; Batsinilas 73'; Anastopoulos 85' (pen.)

Makario Stadium, Nicosia
Attendance: 9,583
Referee: Velitchko Tzontchev (Bulgaria)

21 December 1986

Cyprus	0–2	Netherlands
	(Details)	Gullit 19'; Bosman 72'

Tsirion Stadium, Limassol
Attendance: 7,483
Referee: Ioan Igna (Romania)

14 January 1987

Greece	3–1	Cyprus
Anastopoulos 54', 66'; Bonovas 63'	(Details)	Savva 60'

Olympic Stadium, Athens
Attendance: 41,076
Referee: Helmut Kohl (Austria)

8 February 1987

Cyprus	0–1	Hungary
	(Details)	Boda 49'

Makario Stadium, Nicosia
Attendance: 4,195
Referee: Dragiša Komadinić (Yugoslavia)

25 March 1987

Netherlands	1–1	Greece
Van Basten 56'	(Details)	Saravakos 5'

De Kuip, Rotterdam
Attendance: 44,176
Referee: Carlo Longhi (Italy)

12 April 1987

Poland	0–0	Cyprus
	(Details)

Stadion Lechii, Gdańsk
Attendance: 23,500
Referee: Simo Ruokonen (Finland)

29 April 1987

Greece	1–0	Poland
Saravakos 57'	(Details)

Olympic Stadium, Athens
Attendance: 68,554
Referee: Zoran Petrović (Yugoslavia)
29 April 1987

Netherlands	2–0	Hungary
Gullit 37'; Mühren 40'	(Details)

De Kuip, Rotterdam
Attendance: 53,035
Referee: George Courtney (England)

17 May 1987

Hungary	5–3	Poland
Vincze 38'; Détári 62' (pen.), 75'; Péter 65'; Preszeller 88'	(Details)	Marciniak 26'; Smolarek 58'; Wójcicki 80'

Népstadion, Budapest
Attendance: 5,900
Referee: Adolf Prokop (East Germany)

23 September 1987

Poland	3–2	Hungary
Dziekanowski 6'; Tarasiewicz 58'; Leśniak 62'	(Details)	Bognár 10'; Mészáros 64'

Polish Army Stadium, Warsaw
Attendance: 12,000
Referee: Ihsan Türe (Turkey)

14 October 1987

Poland	0–2	Netherlands
	(Details)	Gullit 30', 38'

Górnik Stadium, Zabrze
Attendance: 17,500
Referee: Robert Valentine (Scotland)
14 October 1987

Hungary	3–0	Greece
Détári 4'; Bognár 12'; Mészáros 15'	(Details)

Népstadion, Budapest
Attendance: 8,000
Referee: Dieter Pauly (West Germany)

28 October 1987
20:00

Netherlands	Annulled (Note: The Netherlands v Cyprus match originally finished as an 8–0 win for the Netherlands, but the match was marred by crowd violence after Cyprus goalkeeper Andreas Charitou was hit by a firework. Charitou was injured and had to be replaced, and the Cyprus players left the field in protest and refused to play. Eventually after discussion between referee Roger Philippi, UEFA observer Alfred Delcourt and team officials, the Cyprus players agreed in a written statement to finish the match, though under protest. On 12 November the result was annulled by UEFA, and the match forfeited to Cyprus with 0–3. On 21 November, after the appeal from the Netherlands, the match was ordered to be replayed behind closed doors, which took place on 9 December 1987.) (8–0)	Cyprus
Bosman 1', 39', 53', 61', 67'; Gullit 20'; Spelbos 40'; Van 't Schip 47'	Report

De Kuip, Rotterdam
Attendance: 49,670
Referee: Roger Philippi (Luxembourg)

11 November 1987

Cyprus	0–1	Poland
	(Details)	Leśniak 74'

Tsirion Stadium, Limassol
Attendance: 2,497
Referee: Dimitar Charlatchki (Bulgaria)

2 December 1987

Hungary	1–0	Cyprus
Kiprich 88'	(Details)

Üllöi Uti stadion, Budapest
Attendance: 2,300
Referee: Ștefan Dan Petrescu (Romania)

9 December 1987

Netherlands	4–0	Cyprus
Bosman 34', 43', 66'; Koeman 63' (pen.)	(Details)

De Meer Stadium, Amsterdam
Attendance: 300
Referee: Ivan Gregr (Czechoslovakia)

16 December 1987

Greece	0–3	Netherlands
	(Details)	Koeman 18'; Gillhaus 76', 81'

Diagoras Stadium, Rhodes
Attendance: 4,442
Referee: Keith Hackett (England)

== Goalscorers ==
There were 60 goals scored in 21 matches, for an average of 2.86 goals per match. (Note: The matches/goals tally takes into account fixtures that were subsequently annulled.)

9 goals

- (Netherlands national football team) John Bosman

5 goals

- (Greece national football team) Nikos Anastopoulos
- (Netherlands national football team) Ruud Gullit

3 goals

- (Hungary national football team) Lajos Détári
- (Poland national football team) Dariusz Dziekanowski

2 goals

- (Greece national football team) Dimitris Saravakos
- (Hungary national football team) Imre Boda
- (Hungary national football team) György Bognár
- (Hungary national football team) Ferenc Mészáros
- (Netherlands national football team) Hans Gillhaus
- (Netherlands national football team) Ronald Koeman
- (Netherlands national football team) Marco van Basten
- (Poland national football team) Marek Leśniak

1 goal

- (Cyprus national football team) Evagoras Christofi
- (Cyprus national football team) Pavlos Savva
- (Cyprus national football team) Giorgos Savvidis
- (Greece national football team) Kostas Antoniou
- (Greece national football team) Kostas Batsinilas
- (Greece national football team) Andreas Bonovas
- (Greece national football team) Tasos Mitropoulos
- (Greece national football team) Lakis Papaioannou
- (Hungary national football team) József Kiprich
- (Hungary national football team) Zoltán Péter
- (Hungary national football team) Tamás Preszeller
- (Hungary national football team) István Vincze
- (Netherlands national football team) Arnold Mühren
- (Netherlands national football team) Ronald Spelbos
- (Netherlands national football team) John van 't Schip
- (Poland national football team) Dariusz Marciniak
- (Poland national football team) Włodzimierz Smolarek
- (Poland national football team) Ryszard Tarasiewicz
- (Poland national football team) Roman Wójcicki
