= 1994 Greece Tournament =

Tournament details
- Host country: Greece
- Dates: 9 – 13 May
- Teams: 3
- Venue(s): 2 (in 2 host cities)

Final positions
- Champions: Cameroon (1st title)
- Runners-up: Bolivia
- Third place: Greece

Tournament statistics
- Matches played: 3
- Goals scored: 5 (1.67 per match)
- Top scorer(s): Five players (1 goal each)

The 1994 Greece Tournament was a summer international football friendly tournament held in Greece, between 9 and 13 May 1994. Besides the host nation Greece, Cameroon , and Bolivia participated in the tournament.

This mini-tournament was arranged as part of Greece's build-up to the 1994 FIFA World Cup, which was the first time they had made it to the FIFA World Cup finals.

== Results ==
9 May 1994

Greece	0–3	Cameroon
	Report	Embe 26'; Tataw 45'; Loga 72'

Karaiskakis Stadium, Piraeus
Attendance: 4,262
Referee: (Austria) Alfred Wieser

11 May 1994

Cameroon	1–1	Bolivia
Ekeme 7'	Report	Peña 62'

Spyros Louis Stadium, Athens
Attendance: 600
Referee: Karl Finzinger

13 May 1994

Greece	0–0	Bolivia
	Report1

Karaiskakis Stadium, Piraeus
Attendance: 2,661
Referee: (Austria) Alfred Wieser

== Table ==
Pos	Team	Pld	W	D	L	GF	GA	GD	Pts
1	Cameroon	2	1	1	0	4	1	+3	4
2	Bolivia	2	0	2	0	1	1	0	2
3	Greece (H)	2	0	1	1	0	3	−3	1

Source: RSSSF
(H) Hosts

1994 Greece Tournament

Cameroon
First title

== Statistics ==
=== Goalscorers ===
There were 5 goals scored in 3 matches, for an average of 1.67 goals per match.

1 goal

- (Bolivia) Álvaro Peña
- (Cameroon) David Embe
- (Cameroon) Stephen Tataw
- (Cameroon) Loga
- (Cameroon) Samuel Ekeme

== See also ==
- Tournoi de France
- Hassan II Trophy
