= 1982 FIFA World Cup qualification – UEFA Group 5 =

Football tournament qualification stage

Group 5 consisted of five of the 34 teams entered into the European zone: Denmark, Greece, Italy, Luxembourg, and Yugoslavia. These five teams competed on a home-and-away basis for two of the 14 spots in the final tournament allocated to the European zone, with the group's winner and runner-up claiming those spots.

== Standings ==
Rank	Team	Pts	Pld	W	D	L	GF	GA	GD
1	Yugoslavia	13	8	6	1	1	22	7	+15
2	Italy	12	8	5	2	1	12	5	+7
3	Denmark	8	8	4	0	4	14	11	+3
4	Greece	7	8	3	1	4	10	13	−3
5	Luxembourg	0	8	0	0	8	1	23	−22

=== Results ===
10 September 1980

Luxembourg	0 – 5	Yugoslavia
	Report	Sušić 50'; Zl. Vujović 64', 81'; Petrović 70'; Buljan 90'

Municipal, Luxembourg City
Attendance: 3,500
Referee: Franz Latzin (Austria)

27 September 1980

Yugoslavia	2 – 1	Denmark
Pantelić 18' (pen.); Zo. Vujović 37'	Report	Arnesen 5' (pen.)

Bežigrad, Ljubljana
Attendance: 20,000
Referee: Antonio Garrido (Portugal)

11 October 1980

Luxembourg	0 – 2	Italy
	Report	Collovati 33'; Bettega 77'

Municipal, Luxembourg City
Attendance: 10,000
Referee: Henk Weerink (Netherlands)

15 October 1980

Denmark	0 – 1	Greece
	Report	Kouis 50'

Idrætsparken, Copenhagen
Attendance: 45,700
Referee: Éamonn Farrell (Republic of Ireland)

1 November 1980

Italy	2 – 0	Denmark
Graziani 7', 51'	Report

Stadio Olimpico, Rome
Attendance: 45,087
Referee: Belaïd Lacarne (Algeria)

15 November 1980

Italy	2 – 0	Yugoslavia
Cabrini 40' (pen.); Conti 75'	Report

Stadio Comunale Vittorio Pozzo, Turin
Attendance: 50,677
Referee: Abraham Klein (Israel)

19 November 1980

Denmark	4 – 0	Luxembourg
Arnesen 13', 41' (pen.); Elkjær 57'; Simonsen 71'	Report

Idrætsparken, Copenhagen
Attendance: 10,600
Referee: Clive White (England)

6 December 1980

Greece	0 – 2	Italy
	Report	Antognoni 10'; Scirea 81'

Leoforos Alexandras Stadium, Athens
Attendance: 25,000
Referee: Michel Vautrot (France)

28 January 1981

Greece	2 – 0	Luxembourg
Kouis 8'; Kostikos 33'	Report

Charliaou Stadium, Thessaloniki
Attendance: 11,114
Referee: Nikolai Dudin (Bulgaria)

11 March 1981

Luxembourg	0 – 2	Greece
	Report	Kouis 31'; Mavros 54' (pen.)

Municipal, Luxembourg City
Attendance: 8,590
Referee: Peter Scherz (Switzerland)

29 April 1981

Yugoslavia	5 – 1	Greece
Šljivo 7'; Halilhodžić 23'; Pantelić 42' (pen.); Zl. Vujović 50', 56'	Report	Kostikos 76' (pen.)

Poljud, Split
Attendance: 45,000
Referee: Valeri Butenko (Soviet Union)

1 May 1981

Luxembourg	1 – 2	Denmark
Nurenberg 37'	Report	Elkjær 46'; Arnesen 62'

Municipal Stadium, Luxembourg City
Attendance: 2,844
Referee: Louis Delsemme (Belgium)

3 June 1981

Denmark	3 – 1	Italy
Røntved 59'; Arnesen 61'; Bastrup 87'	Report	Graziani 69'

Idrætsparken, Copenhagen
Attendance: 36,300
Referee: Franz Wöhrer (Austria)

9 September 1981

Denmark	1 – 2	Yugoslavia
Elkjær 62'	Report	Zl. Vujović 48'; Petrović 63'

Idrætsparken, Copenhagen
Attendance: 48,400
Referee: Siegfried Kirschen (East Germany)

14 October 1981

Greece	2 – 3	Denmark
Anastopoulos 60'; Kouis 84'	Report	Lerby 8'; Arnesen 28'; Elkjær 65'

Charliaou Stadium, Thessaloniki
Attendance: 18,000
Referee: Josef Bucek (Austria)

17 October 1981

Yugoslavia	1 – 1	Italy
Zl. Vujović 9'	Report	Bettega 33'

FK Crvena Zvezda Stadium, Belgrade
Attendance: 70,000
Referee: Walter Eschweiler (West Germany)

14 November 1981

Italy	1 – 1	Greece
Conti 61'	Report	Kouis 87'

Stadio Comunale Vittorio Pozzo, Turin
Attendance: 39,670
Referee: Nicolae Rainea (Romania)

21 November 1981

Yugoslavia	5 – 0	Luxembourg
Halilhodžić 1', 45'; Šurjak 65'; Pašić 73'; Zl. Vujović 75'	Report

Karađorđe Stadium, Novi Sad
Attendance: 15,000
Referee: Charles Scerri (Malta)

29 November 1981

Greece	1 – 2	Yugoslavia
Mavros 5'	Report	Šurjak 22'; Jerković 39'

Karaiskaki Stadium, Piraeus
Attendance: 11,595
Referee: George Courtney (England)

5 December 1981

Italy	1 – 0	Luxembourg
Collovati 7'	Report

San Paolo, Naples
Attendance: 49,247
Referee: Velichko Tsonchev (Bulgaria)
