= 1986 FIFA World Cup qualification – UEFA Group 1 =

Football tournament qualification stage

The 1986 FIFA World Cup qualification UEFA Group 1 was a UEFA qualifying group for the 1986 FIFA World Cup. The group comprised Albania, Belgium, Greece and Poland.

The group was won on goals scored by Poland, who qualified for the 1986 FIFA World Cup. The runners-up Belgium entered the UEFA play-off stage.

== Standings ==
Pos	Team	Pld	W	D	L	GF	GA	GD	Pts	Qualification	Poland national football team	Belgium national football team	Albania national football team	Greece national football team
1	Poland	6	3	2	1	10	6	+4	8	Qualification to 1986 FIFA World Cup	—	0–0	2–2	3–1
2	Belgium	6	3	2	1	7	3	+4	8	Advance to UEFA play-off	2–0	—	3–1	2–0
3	Albania	6	1	2	3	6	9	−3	4		0–1	2–0	—	1–1
4	Greece	6	1	2	3	5	10	−5	4		1–4	0–0	2–0	—

=== Results ===
17 October 1984

Belgium	3–1	Albania
Claesen 59'; Scifo 84'; Voordeckers 88'	Report	Omuri 71'

Heysel Stadium, Brussels
Attendance: 8,978
Referee: Arto Ravander (Finland)
17 October 1984

Poland	3–1	Greece
Smolarek 62'; Dziekanowski 65', 79'	Report	Mitropoulos 35'

Górnik Zabrze Stadium, Zabrze
Attendance: 13,888
Referee: Sven Thime (Norway)

31 October 1984

Poland	2–2	Albania
Smolarek 23'; Pałasz 80'	Report	Omuri 55'; Kola 75'

Stadion Stali Mielec, Mielec
Attendance: 24,500
Referee: Bruno Galler (Switzerland)

19 December 1984

Greece	0–0	Belgium
	Report

Olympic Stadium, Athens
Attendance: 23,198
Referee: Heinz Fahnler (Austria)

22 December 1984

Albania	2–0	Belgium
Josa 69'; Minga 86'	Report

Qemal Stafa Stadium, Tirana
Attendance: 19,802
Referee: Victoriano Sanchez Arminio (Spain)

27 February 1985

Greece	2–0	Albania
Saravakos 9'; Antoniou 37'	Report

Olympic Stadium, Athens
Attendance: 8,133
Referee: Ioan Igna (Romania)

27 March 1985

Belgium	2–0	Greece
Vercauteren 69'; Scifo 89'	Report

Heysel Stadium, Brussels
Attendance: 31,203
Referee: Keith Hackett (England)

1 May 1985

Belgium	2–0	Poland
Vandenbergh 30'; Vercauteren 53'	Report

Heysel Stadium, Brussels
Attendance: 48,310
Referee: Malcolm Moffatt (Northern Ireland)

19 May 1985

Greece	1–4	Poland
Anastopoulos 47'	Report	Smolarek 25'; Ostrowski 58'; Boniek 78'; Dziekanowski 90'

Olympic Stadium, Athens
Attendance: 29,731
Referee: Zoran Petrovic (Yugoslavia)

30 May 1985

Albania	0–1	Poland
	Report	Boniek 24'

Qemal Stafa Stadium, Tirana
Attendance: 19,793
Referee: Yordan Zezov (Bulgaria)

11 September 1985

Poland	0–0	Belgium
	Report

Silesian Stadium, Chorzów
Attendance: 68,978
Referee: Bob Valentine (Scotland)

30 October 1985

Albania	1–1	Greece
Omuri 24'	Report	Skartados 54'

Qemal Stafa Stadium, Tirana
Attendance: 17,000
Referee: Raul Fernandes Nazare (Portugal)

== Goalscorers ==
3 goals

- (Albania) Bedri Omuri
- (Poland) Dariusz Dziekanowski
- (Poland) Włodzimierz Smolarek

2 goals

- (Belgium) Enzo Scifo
- (Belgium) Franky Vercauteren
- (Poland) Zbigniew Boniek

1 goal

- (Albania) Mirel Josa
- (Albania) Agustin Kola
- (Albania) Arben Minga
- (Belgium) Nico Claesen
- (Belgium) Erwin Vandenbergh
- (Belgium) Eddy Voordeckers
- (Greece) Nikos Anastopoulos
- (Greece) Kostas Antoniou
- (Greece) Tasos Mitropoulos
- (Greece) Dimitris Saravakos
- (Greece) Georgios Skartados
- (Poland) Marek Ostrowski
- (Poland) Andrzej Pałasz
