= Dragan Pantelić =

Serbian footballer (1951–2021)

- Драган Пантелић
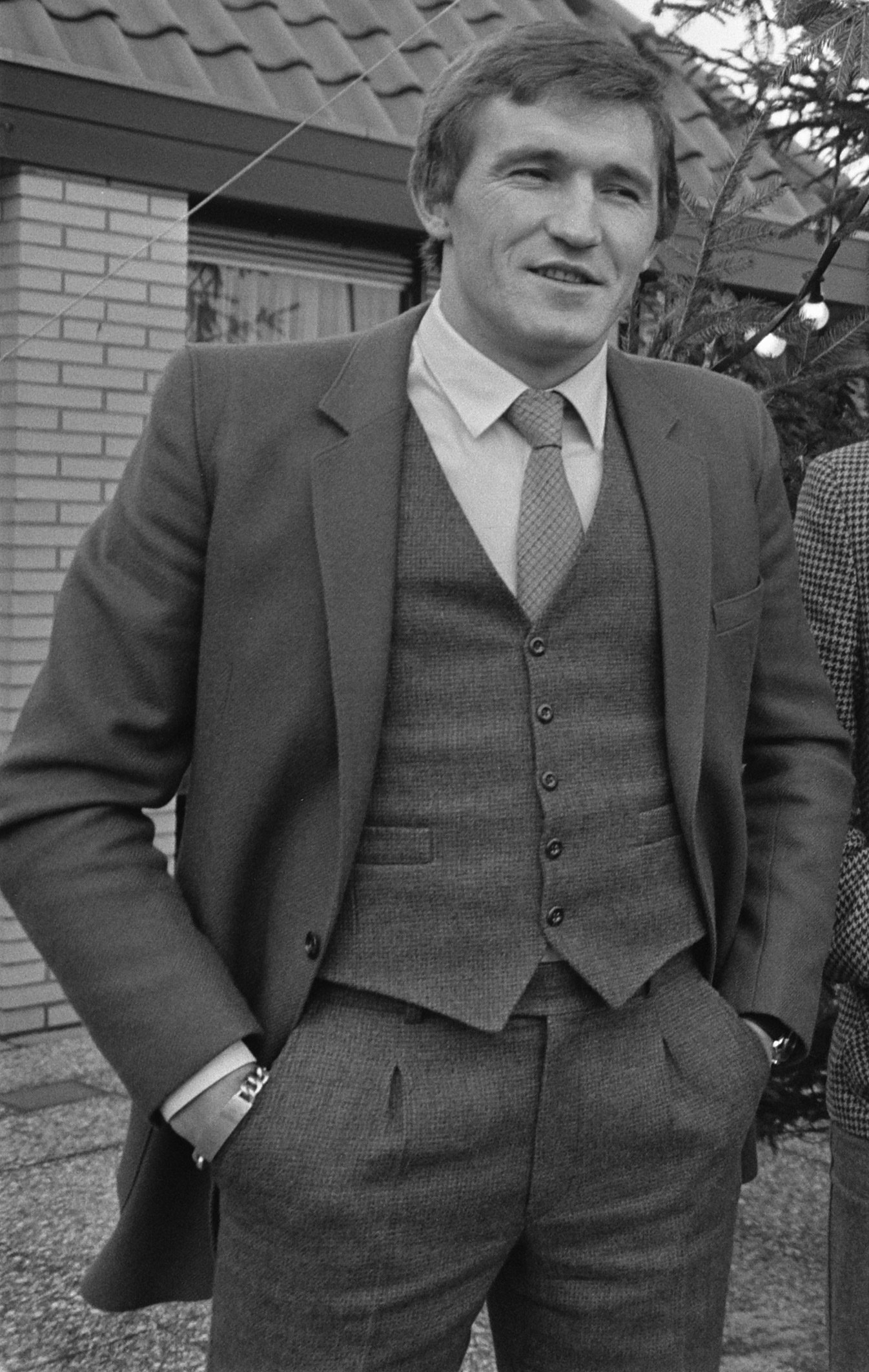

Member of the National Assembly of Serbia
- In office 2000–2004

Personal details
- Born: 9 December 1951 Loznica, PR Serbia, FPR Yugoslavia
- Died: 20 October 2021 (aged 69) Niš, Serbia
- Party: Party of Serbian Unity (SSJ) (2000–2004)
- Occupation: Footballer; legislator
Association football career
- Height: 1.85 m (6 ft 1 in)
- Position: Goalkeeper
Youth career
- Rađevac
- Grafičar Beograd
Senior career*
Years	Team	Apps	(Gls)
1971–1981	Radnički Niš	261	(15)
1981–1983	Bordeaux	36	(2)
1983–1984	Timok	5	(0)
1984–1985	Radnički Niš	12	(1)
Total		314	(18)
International career
1979–1980	Yugoslavia Olympic	8	(0)
1979–1984	Yugoslavia	19	(2)
Managerial career
- 1989–1990: Radnički Niš
- * Club domestic league appearances and goals

Dragan Pantelić (Serbian Cyrillic: Драган Пантелић; 9 December 1951 – 20 October 2021) was a Yugoslav professional footballer who played as a goalkeeper. He scored over 20 goals over the course of his career, mainly from penalties.

== Biography ==
Pantelić was born in Loznica, Serbia. After starting out at Rađevac and Grafičar Beograd, Pantelić spent ten seasons with Radnički Niš from 1971 to 1981. He amassed over 250 appearances in the Yugoslav First League, netting 15 goals. In a 2-1 league win against Velež Mostar at home on 13 April 1980, he famously scored the match-winning goal from inside his own penalty area, 80 meters away from the Velež goal kept by their goalkeeper Enver Marić.

Pantelić later moved abroad to France and joined Bordeaux, representing the side for two seasons. In 1982, Bordeaux played without a goalkeeper in a match away to Nantes in protest at a suspension for Pantelić. Nantes won 6–0. The match became a staple of football 'blooper' videos.

After briefly playing for Timok in the Yugoslav Second League, Pantelić returned to Radnički Niš in the 1984–85 season, before retiring from the game.

Pantelić died on 20 October 2021, at the Niš University clinical center after short battle with COVID-19. He was 69.

== International career ==
At international level, Pantelić earned 19 caps for Yugoslavia between 1979 and 1984, scoring two goals. He also represented the country at the 1980 Summer Olympics, as they finished in fourth place and took part at the 1982 FIFA World Cup.

=== International goals ===
No.	Date	Venue	Opponent	Score	Result	Competition
1	27 September 1980	Bežigrad Stadium, Ljubljana, Yugoslavia	Denmark	1–1	2–1	1982 FIFA World Cup qualification
2	29 April 1981	Stadion Poljud, Split, Yugoslavia	Greece	3–0	5–1	1982 FIFA World Cup qualification

Source: 11v11

== Post-playing career ==
After ending his playing career, Pantelić temporarily served as manager of Radnički Niš between November 1989 and March 1990. He was also the president of the club in the late 1990s.

== Political career ==
Pantelić was a member of Party of Serbian Unity (SSJ), founded by Željko Ražnatović Arkan. He was a member of Serbian Parliament in 2000–2004.

== Honours ==
Radnički Niš

- Balkans Cup: 1975
