= Stadion Stali Mielec =

Sports venue in Mielec, Poland

Coordinates: 50°17′55″N 21°26′9″E

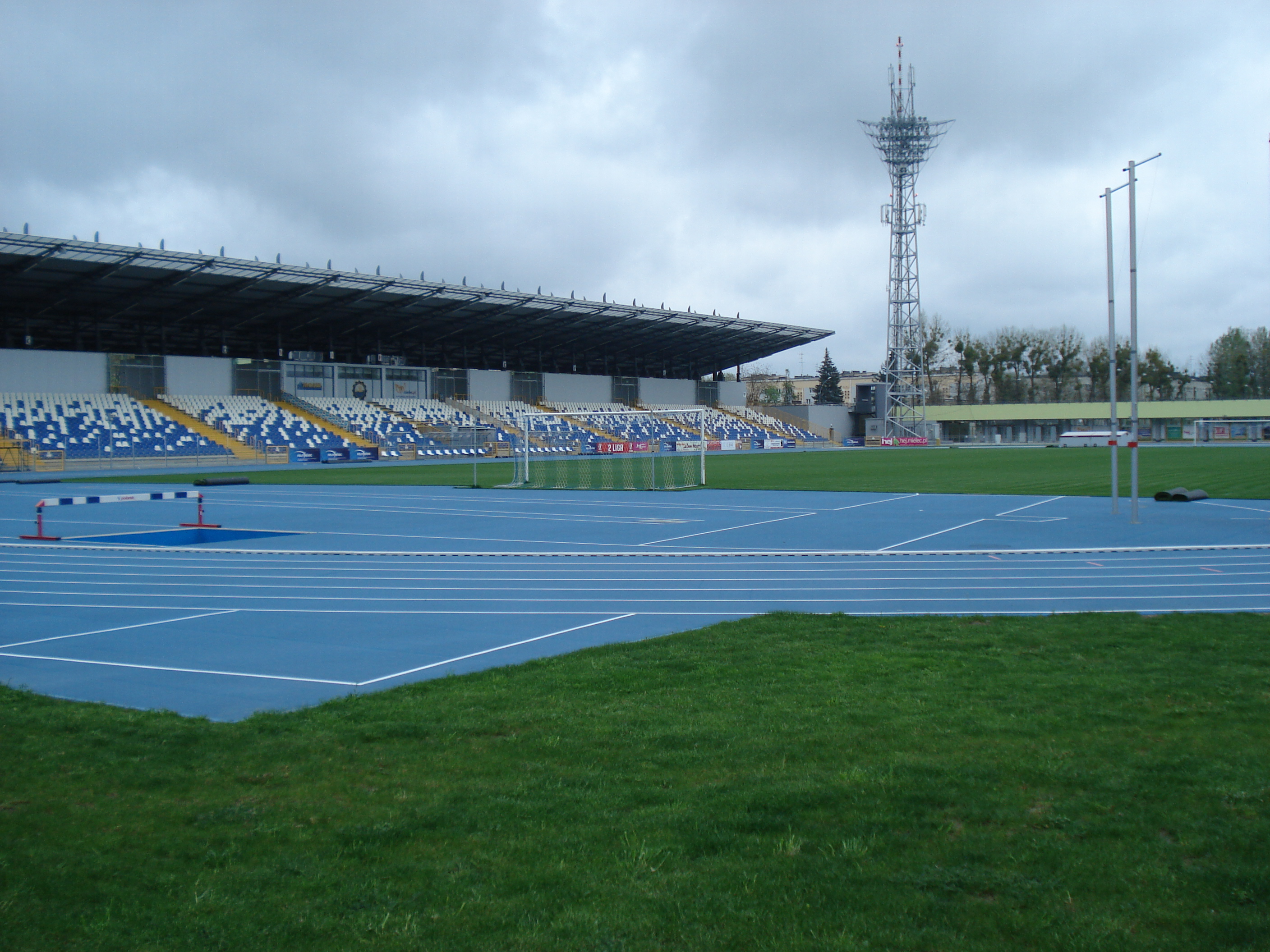
- Reconstructed stadium, as it appeared in 2014
- Interactive map of Stadion Stali Mielec
- Full name: Stadion Miejski im. Grzegorza Lato
- Location: Mielec, Poland
- Owner: City of Mielec
- Capacity: 7,000
- Field size: 105m x 68m

Construction
- Built: 1953
- Opened: 1953
- Renovated: 2013

Tenant
- Stal Mielec

The Stadion Stali Mielec (English: Stal Mielec Stadium) is a multi-use stadium in Mielec, Poland, with a 6,849 seating capacity. It has been the home ground of Stal Mielec since its opening in 1953 and is also used by the LKS Mielec athletic club.

The stadium is officially named the Stadion Miejski im. Grzegorza Lato (English: Grzegorz Lato Municipal Stadium).

The stadium has hosted numerous European Champions Cup, UEFA Cup, and Poland national team matches, including FIFA World Cup and UEFA European Championship qualifiers. Most notably, the stadium hosted Real Madrid in the 1976–77 European Cup with a record attendance exceeding 40,000 spectators. In 2025, the stadium hosted matches of the UEFA Women's Under-19 Championship.

== History ==
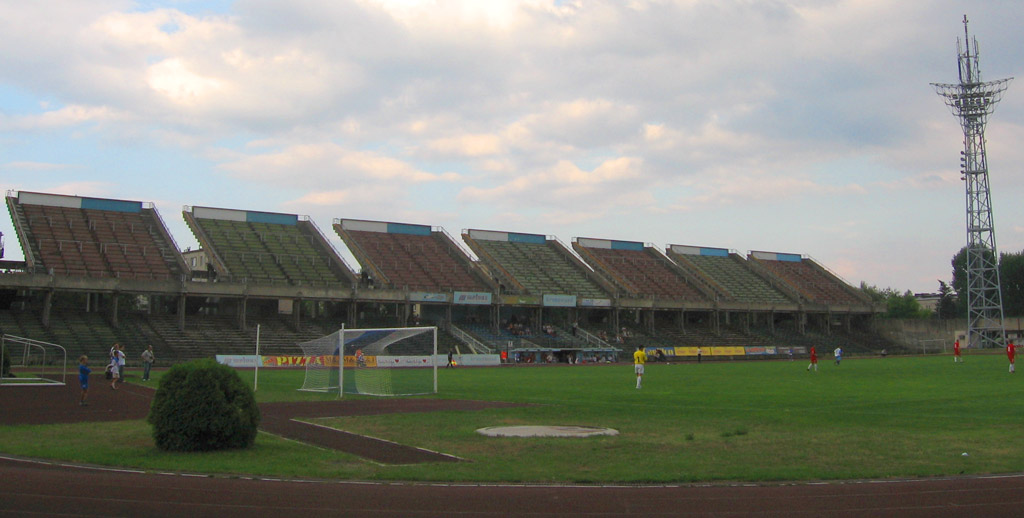
The stadium prior to its recent reconstruction

The stadium opened in November 1953 with the opening match between Stal Mielec and Garbarnia Kraków. The following year, two stands for 7,000 spectators were constructed. Along with the stands, two sports training fields, a volleyball field, basketball and tennis courts were also constructed. A race track, a high jumping area and other athletic displays emerged.

In 1973-1976, the construction of two new upper-level stands expanded the seating capacity to 30,000 spectators (Matches against Hamburg SV in the 1975–76 UEFA Cup quarter-final, Real Madrid in the 1976–77 European Cup first round and K.S.C. Lokeren in the 1982–83 UEFA Cup first round contained records of 40,000 spectators)

Stadium light towers were constructed in 1979-1980 allowing for the highest light power in the country at the time: 1800 lx. The first match with the new lighting took place on 29 October 1980 between Stal Mielec and ŁKS Łódź

Due to the undergoing economic structure in Poland as a result of the fall of communism, Stal Mielec's participation in major football competitions declined. Private sponsors stopped investments into the league and developments of the stadium, and neighbouring sports objects stopped. The structural condition of the stadium deteriorated with the upper level stands being closed off from the public.

The financial inconveniences gradually began to resolve with the formation of Stal Mielec as an independent club in 1997, the undertaking of the stadium by the Municipality of Mielec from PZL Mielec in 2001 and the vote by Mielec City Council on 6 September 2007 to draft a reconstruction project for the stadium .

Historically a flea market "Bazaar" had been functioning from 22 February 1990 on the eastern part of the stadium, opened every Thursday and Saturday up until reconstruction works began.

In 2025, Stadium Mielec was one of the stadiums for the UEFA Women's Under-19 Championship.

== Modernisation ==
In 2011, Mielec City Council contracted TAMEX Obiekty Sportowe S.A. to undertake the reconstruction of the stadium, costing the city 40 million PLN. The stadium capacity was reduced from 22,000 to 6,849, and divided into 18 sectors. The lighting towers, athletic and recreational areas were also renovated during the process. Reconstruction works lasted from January 2011 to August 2013.

The newly reconstructed stadium opened on 30 August 2013, with the opening match taking place the next day between FKS Stal Mielec - Wigry Suwałki.

The eastern stand houses FKS Stal Mielec and the club shop while the western stand houses LKS Mielec and a sports centre.

== Poland national team matches ==
The Poland national team has played four games at the Stadion Miejski in Mielec.

| Nr | Competition | Date | Opponent | Result | Scorers for Poland | Scorers for opponent |
|---|---|---|---|---|---|---|
| 1 | 1986 FIFA World Cup qualification | 31 October 1984 | Albania | 2–2 | Włodzimierz Smolarek; Andrzej Pałasz | Bedri Omuri; Agustin Kola |
| 2 | Friendly | 9 September 1992 | Israel | 1–1 | Roman Szewczyk | Ronny Rosenthal |
| 3 | UEFA Euro 1996 qualifying | 12 October 1994 | Azerbaijan | 1–0 | Andrzej Juskowiak | — |
| 4 | Friendly | 1 May 1996 | Belarus | 1–1 | Wojciech Kowalczyk | Pyotr Kachura |
