= Tamás Preszeller =

Hungarian footballer

Personal information
- Date of birth: 24 August 1958 (age 68)
- Place of birth: Mosonmagyaróvár, Hungary
- Positions: Midfielder; defender

Youth career
- 1970–1974: Mosoni Vasas
- 1974–1979: Fehérvár FC

Senior career*
Years	Team	Apps	(Gls)
1979–1980	Fehérvár FC	6	(1)
1980–1984	Szombathelyi Haladás	83	(0)
1984–1990	Győri ETO FC	132	(5)
1990–1991	MTK Budapest FC	14	(1)

International career
1986–1988	Hungary	7	(1)

Managerial career
- 2015–2016: Győri ETO FC
- * Club domestic league appearances and goals

Tamás Preszeller (born 24 August 1958) is a Hungarian former professional football player and coach. He played both as a midfielder and defender. He was a member of the Hungary national team.

== Playing career ==
Preszeller started his football career in the Mosoni Vasas team. From there he moved to Fehérvár FC, where he played until 1980. From 1980 to 1984 he played for Szombathelyi Haladás. He moved to Győri ETO FC in 1984, where he made 132 matches until 1990. He retired from active football with MTK Budapest FC.

Between 1986 and 1988 he played seven times for the Hungary national team scoring one goal.

== Coaching career ==
From 2015 to 2016 Preszeller coached Győri ETO FC.
