= Dinos Kouis =

Greek footballer

Personal information
- Full name: Konstantinos Kouis
- Date of birth: 5 June 1955 (age 71)
- Place of birth: Xylopoli, Thessaloniki, Greece
- Height: 1.83 m (6 ft 0 in)
- Position: Central midfielder

Senior career*
| Years | Team | Apps | (Gls) |
| 1970–1974 | Agrotikos Asteras | | |
| 1974–1991 | Aris | 473 | (142) |

International career^{‡}
| 1978–1986 | Greece | 33 | (7) |
- * Club domestic league appearances and goals as of 1991 ‡ National team caps and goals as of 1991

Dinos Kouis (Greek: Ντίνος Κούης) is a Greek retired footballer, one of the best to have ever played for Aris Thessaloniki. Kouis moved to Thessaloniki with his family at age ten, while he started his football career playing for Agrotikos Asteras in 1970. In 1974 he transferred to Aris Thessaloniki. In "the black and yellows", he immediately became a regular starter, initially as a central midfielder and later as an attacking midfielder.

He made his debut on 6 October 1974 in a derby against PAOK Stadium Kleanthis Vikelidis stadium (2–1 win for Aris). He was one of the key players of Aris in the late 1970s and early 1980s alongside Giorgos Foiros, Theodoros Pallas Georgios Semertzidis etc.

His farewell match was on 3 February 1991 in an Alpha Ethniki game against Olympiakos. He played for 16 years and would leave his mark on Greek football, participating in 473 Alpha Ethniki games and scoring 142 goals. Among his distinctions, Kouis was the league top scorer in 1981 with 21 goals.
