= Dariusz Dziekanowski =

Polish footballer (born 1962)

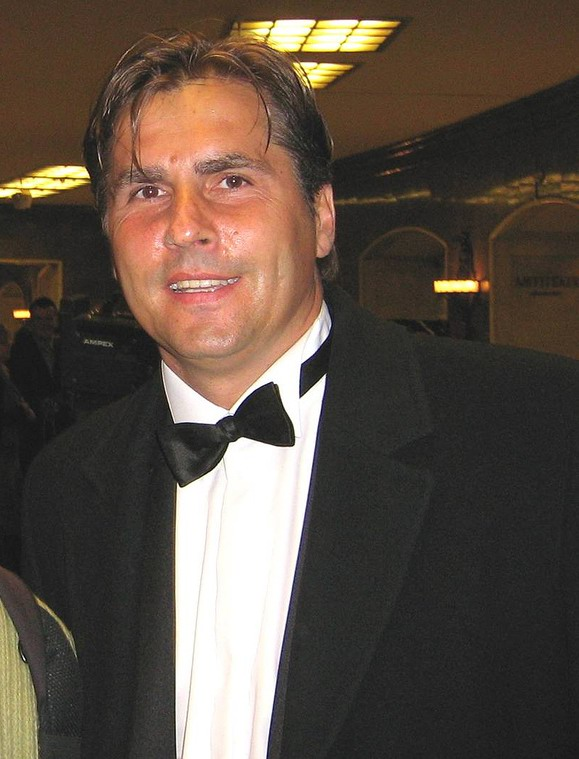
- Dziekanowski in August 2007

Personal information
- Full name: Dariusz Paweł Dziekanowski
- Date of birth: 30 September 1962 (age 64)
- Place of birth: Warsaw, Poland
- Height: 1.78 m (5 ft 10 in)
- Position: Striker

Senior career*
Years	Team	Apps	(Gls)
1973–1979	Polonia Warsaw	4	(1)
1979–1983	Gwardia Warszawa	51	(15)
1983–1985	Widzew Łódź	57	(20)
1985–1989	Legia Warsaw	95	(44)
1989–1992	Celtic	49	(10)
1992–1993	Bristol City	43	(7)
1993–1994	Legia Warsaw	6	(1)
1994	Yverdon-Sports	0	(0)
1994	Alemannia Aachen	12	(2)
1994–1996	1. FC Köln	0	(0)
1996–1997	Polonia Warsaw	22	(4)
Total		325	(101)

International career
1981–1990	Poland	63	(20)
Medal record
Men's football
Representing Poland
UEFA European Under-18 Championship
Runner-up	1980 East Germany
Runner-up	1981 West Germany
- * Club domestic league appearances and goals

Dariusz Paweł Dziekanowski (born 30 September 1962) is a Polish football pundit, coach and former player. He was known as Jacki Dziekanowski during his time playing in the Scottish and English leagues. He started his career at Polonia Warsaw, between 1973 and 1979, throughout the youth set-up and into a very young first team, but went to Gwardia Warszawa from 1979 to 1983.

Having not impressed the coach during his final season, he moved to Widzew Łódź in 1985. However, the following year he was selected in Poland 's roster for the 1986 FIFA World Cup. He won the Polish Cup in 1989. He also had a minor career in archery, in 1988. He decided to move to Celtic in 1989 and became a fan favourite after scoring four goals in a European Cup Winners' Cup tie against Partizan Belgrade. He left Celtic to join Bristol City in 1992.

Troubled years followed where he travelled all around Europe, but eventually he found himself settled back in Warsaw in his retirement season of 1996–97. Since his retirement, he has worked in Polish television as a football commentator. From July 2006 to May 2008 he was an assistant to Leo Beenhakker for the Poland national football team. In 1985, he was the winner of the Polish Footballer of the Year plebiscite organized by the Piłka Nożna football weekly.

== Career statistics ==
=== International ===
Appearances and goals by national team and year
National team	Year	Apps	Goals
Poland	1981	1	1
Poland	1982	3	1
Poland	1983	4	1
Poland	1984	9	6
Poland	1985	13	3
Poland	1986	10	2
Poland	1987	6	1
Poland	1988	3	2
Poland	1989	7	1
Poland	1990	7	2
Total		63	20

=== International goals ===
No.	Date	Venue	Opponent	Score	Result	Competition
1.	15 November 1981	Wrocław, Poland	Malta	5–0	6–0	1982 FIFA World Cup qualification
2.	8 September 1982	Kuopio, Finland	Finland	2–1	3–2	UEFA Euro 1984 qualifying
3.	23 March 1983	Łódź, Poland	Bulgaria	2–0	3–1	Friendly
4.	11 January 1984	Kolkata, India	India	1–0	2–1	1984 Nehru Cup
5.	12 September 1984	Helsinki, Finland	Finland	1–0	2–0	Friendly
6.	26 September 1984	Słupsk, Poland	Turkey	1–0	2–0	Friendly
7.	26 September 1984	Słupsk, Poland	Turkey	2–0	2–0	Friendly
8.	17 October 1984	Zabrze, Poland	Greece	2–1	3–1	1986 FIFA World Cup qualification
9.	17 October 1984	Zabrze, Poland	Greece	3–1	3–1	1986 FIFA World Cup qualification
10.	6 February 1985	Querétaro, Mexico	Bulgaria	1–1	2–2	Friendly
11.	19 May 1985	Athens, Greece	Greece	4–1	4–1	1986 FIFA World Cup qualification
12.	16 November 1985	Chorzów, Poland	Italy	1–0	1–0	Friendly
13.	15 October 1986	Poznań, Poland	Greece	1–0	2–1	UEFA Euro 1988 qualifying
14.	15 October 1986	Poznań, Poland	Greece	2–1	2–1	UEFA Euro 1988 qualifying
15.	23 September 1987	Warsaw, Poland	Hungary	1–0	3–2	UEFA Euro 1988 qualifying
16.	23 March 1988	Belfast, Northern Ireland	Northern Ireland	0–1	1–1	Friendly
17.	1 June 1988	Moscow, Soviet Union	Soviet Union	1–0	1–2	Friendly
18.	5 September 1989	Warsaw, Poland	Greece	2–0	3–0	Friendly
19.	21 May 1990	Marseille, France	United Arab Emirates	1–0	4–0	Friendly
20.	14 November 1990	Istanbul, Turkey	Turkey	1–0	1–0	UEFA Euro 1992 qualifying

== Honours ==
Widzew Łódź

- Polish Cup: 1985–86

Legia Warsaw

- Polish Cup: 1988–89

Polonia Warsaw

- II liga West: 1995–96

Poland

- Nehru Cup: 1984

Poland U18

- UEFA European Under-18 Championship runner-up: 1980, 1981

Individual

- Piłka Nożna Polish Footballer of the Year: 1985
- Ekstraklasa top scorer: 1987–88
