= Paul Loga =

Cameroonian footballer

Personal information
- Full name: Serge-Paul Loga
- Date of birth: 14 August 1969 (age 57)
- Place of birth: Yaoundé, Cameroon

Senior career*
Years	Team	Apps	(Gls)
- Prevoyance Yaoundé

International career
- Cameroon
- * Club domestic league appearances and goals

Serge-Paul Loga (born 14 August 1969) is a Cameroonian retired footballer who played for Prevoyance Yaoundé. He also participated at the 1994 FIFA World Cup.
