= Georgios Semertzidis =

Greek footballer

Personal information
- Full name: Georgios Semertzidis
- Date of birth: 14 June 1957 (age 69)
- Place of birth: Thessaloniki, Greece
- Position: Midfielder

Senior career*
Years	Team	Apps	(Gls)
1976–1985	Aris	243	(27)
1985–1987	Olympiacos	41	(2)
1987–1994	Apollon Kalamarias		

International career
1977–1986	Greece	26	(2)

Managerial career
- 1997: Aris (caretaker)
- 2004–2009: Greece U17
- * Club domestic league appearances and goals

Georgios Semertzidis (Greek: Γεώργιος Σεμερτζίδης; born 14 June 1957) is a Greek football midfielder and later manager.
