= Bedri Omuri =

Albanian footballer

Personal information
- Full name: Bedri Omuri
- Date of birth: 16 January 1957 (age 69)
- Place of birth: Tirana, Albania
- Position: Midfielder

Senior career*
Years	Team	Apps	(Gls)
1976–1978	17 Nëntori Tirana		
1979–1981	Besëlidhja Lezhë		
1981–1991	17 Nëntori Tirana		

International career
1982–1987	Albania	14	(3)
- * Club domestic league appearances and goals

Bedri Omuri (born 16 January 1957 in Albania), nicknamed Bedrana by the SK Tirana fans during the 1980s, is an Albanian retired footballer.

== Club career ==
The midfielder spent most of his playing career at 17 Nëntori Tirana, making his debut against Lokomotiva Durrës in January 1977 and winning 8 domestic trophies. He also had two seasons at Besëlidhja Lezhë.

== International career ==
He made his debut for Albania in a September 1982 European Championship qualification match away at Austria and earned a total of 14 caps, scoring 3 goals. His final international was an April 1987 European Championship qualification match, also against Austria.

== International goals ==
No.	Date	Venue	Opponent	Score	Result	Competition
1.	17 October 1984	Brussels, Belgium	Belgium	1–1	1–3	1986 FIFA World Cup qualification
2.	31 October 1984	Mielec, Poland	Poland	1–1	2–2	1986 FIFA World Cup qualification
3.	30 October 1985	Tirana, Albania	Greece	1–0	1–1	1986 FIFA World Cup qualification

== Personal life ==
After retiring as a player, Omuri worked as a coach with all different age groups at KF Tirana and also worked as a physical education teacher at schools and for Tirana municipality.

== Honours ==
Nëntori Tirana

- Albanian Superliga: 1981–82, 1984–85, 1987–88, 1988–89
- Albanian Cup: 1977, 1983, 1984, 1986
