= Ferenc Mészáros (footballer, born 1963) =

Hungarian footballer

Personal information
- Date of birth: 6 July 1963 (age 63)
- Place of birth: Szekszárd, Hungary
- Height: 1.78 m (5 ft 10 in)
- Position: Striker

Senior career*
Years	Team	Apps	(Gls)
1980–1987	Pécsi	167	(42)
1987–1993	Lokeren	145	(47)
1993–1994	Pécsi	9	(1)
Total		321	(90)

International career
1983–1992	Hungary	21	(4)
- * Club domestic league appearances and goals

Ferenc Mészáros (born 6 July 1963) is a Hungarian former footballer who played at both professional and international levels as a striker.

== Career ==
Born in Szekszárd, Mészáros played club football in Hungary and Belgium for Pécsi and Lokeren.

He earned a total of 24 caps for Hungary.
