= 1993–94 AEK Athens F.C. season =

AEK Athens
1993–94 season
- Chairman: Giannis Karras (until 31 May); Dimitris Melissanidis
- Manager: Dušan Bajević
- Stadium: Nikos Goumas Stadium
- Alpha Ethniki: 1st
- Greek Cup: Runners-up
- Greek Super Cup: Runners-up
- UEFA Champions League: First round
- Top goalscorer: League: Alexis Alexandris (24); All: Alexis Alexandris (30)
- Highest home attendance: 22,982 (vs Monaco) (29 September 1993)
- Lowest home attendance: 2,009 (vs Paniliakos) (10 November 1993)
- Average home league attendance: 11,384
- Biggest win: Keratsini 0–7 AEK Athens
- Biggest defeat: Olympiacos 3–0 AEK Athens
Home colours	Away colours	Third colours

The 1993–94 season was the 70th season in the existence of AEK Athens F.C. and the 35th consecutive season in the top flight of Greek football. They competed in the Alpha Ethniki, the Greek Cup, the Greek Super Cup and the UEFA Champions League. The season began on 18 August 1993 and finished on 24 April 1994.

== Kits ==
Supplier: Basic
Sponsor(s): Phoenix Asfaleies

Home	Away	Third

== Overview ==
In the summer of 1993, the administration of Karras-Melissanidis, in collaboration with the manager, Dušan Bajević, decided to make a renewal in the roster, despite having won the championship of the previous season. Thus the older Minou, Vasilopoulos, Karagiozopoulos, Papaioannou and Georgiadis left the club and the younger Kasapis, Borbokis, Vlachos and Vasilis Karagiannis came in, while it was also decided that Atmatsidis, Tsiartas and Kopitsis, that were signed during the previous season, would have a more active role within the team.

Bajević presented for yet another year a strong team that won the championship for third consecutive time, easilier than the previous season which they were established as one of the most important teams in Greek football. Amongst the important victories of the season were those against Panathinaikos at both home and away, while the highest-scoring victory was against Apollon Athens with 4–0. The title was mathematically sealed after the penultimate match against Apollon Kalamarias.

For the first round of the UEFA Champions League, AEK were drawn against Monaco of Arsène Wenger. In the first match at Stade Louis II, lined up without Manolas, AEK appeared frivolous, unprepared and disjointed, as they were vulnerable in their defensive line, problematic in the midfield and the offense was not particularly threatening. The French created a flurry of chances, but got the win thanks to an own goal by Vlachos. In the rematch of Nikos Goumas Stadium, AEK were not bold and quickly found themselves back in the score with a goal by Djorkaeff, but managed to equalize early enough with Slišković, but without becoming particularly threatening. Afterwards, the fatigue and in general the bad condition of some of their players, as well as the superiority of their opponent did not allow them to claim anything from the game and they were eliminated. Wenger, who in the previous season had been eliminated by Olympiacos with two draws, admitted that AEK were a more technical team than the red and whites, but the latter had played stronger in the match between them.

In the Cup, AEK initially easily overcame the obstacles of Paniliakos and Asteras Ambelokipoi. In the quarter-finals they faced AEL, where they won 0–1 away from home and drew 1–1 at Nea Filadelfeia. In the semi-finals they played against Aris, where after a goalless draw in Thessaloniki, they defeated them in Athens by 2–1. In the final against Panathinaikos, in a packed Olympic Stadium, reportedly one of the best Greek Cup finals of all time took place. Panathinaikos took the lead with a goal by Warzycha at the 31st minute, while at the 54th minute they doubled their goals with an own goal by Manolas. AEK found the focus to equalize with goals by Alexandris at the 71st minute and Dimitriadis at the 77th minute, sending the match to extra time. There, Alexandris made it 2–3 at the 95th minute, but three minutes before the end, Panathinaikos equalized with Markos. The match went to penalty shoot-out where Panathinaikos won with 4–2 and took the trophy.

The main players of the team for this period were Alexis Alexandris, Toni Savevski, Refik Šabanadžović, Stelios Manolas, Michalis Kasapis and Vasilis Dimitriadis. The top scorer of both the team and the league was Alexandris, who together with Warzycha scored 24 goals.

== Management team ==
Position	Staff
Manager	(Bosnia and Herzegovina) Dušan Bajević
Assistant manager	(Greece) Petros Ravousis
Goalkeeping coach	(Greece) Stelios Serafidis
Fitness coach	(Greece) Dimitris Bouroutzikas
Academy director	(Greece) Andreas Stamatiadis
Scout	(Greece) Aris Tsachouridis
Head of Medical	(Greece) Lakis Nikolaou

== Players ==
=== Squad information ===
NOTE: The players are the ones that have been announced by the AEK Athens' press release. No edits should be made unless a player arrival or exit is announced. Updated 24 April 1994, 23:59 UTC+3.

Player	Nat.	Position(s)	Date of birth (Age)	Signed	Previous club	Transfer fee	Contract until
Goalkeepers
Spyros Ikonomopoulos	(Greece)	GK	25 July 1959 (aged 34)	1979	(Greece) AEK Athens U20	—	1995
Ilias Atmatsidis	(Greece)	GK	24 April 1969 (aged 25)	1992	(Greece) Pontioi Veria	₯40,000,000	1996
Vasilis Karagiannis	(Greece)	GK	27 September 1969 (aged 24)	1993	(Greece) Diagoras	₯20,000,000	1998
Defenders
Stelios Manolas	(Greece)	CB / RB	13 July 1961 (aged 32)	1980	(Greece) AEK Athens U20	—	1995
Georgios Agorogiannis	(Greece)	RB / RM / RW	3 May 1966 (aged 28)	1992	(Greece) AEL	₯35,000,000	1996
Georgios Koutoulas	(Greece)	CB / LB	9 February 1967 (aged 27)	1987	(Greece) AEK Athens U20	—	1996
Michalis Vlachos	(Greece)	CB / DM	20 September 1967 (aged 26)	1993	(Greece) Olympiacos	Free	1995
Manolis Papadopoulos	(Greece)	CB	22 April 1968 (aged 26)	1992	(Greece) Olympiacos	Free	1995
Vaios Karagiannis	(Greece)	LB / CB	25 June 1968 (aged 26)	1990	(Greece) A.O. Karditsa	₯11,000,000	1996
Vasilios Borbokis	(Greece)	RB / RM	10 February 1969 (aged 25)	1993	(Greece) Apollon Kalamarias	Free	1997
Charis Kopitsis	(Greece)	RB / RM / LB / LM	5 March 1969 (aged 25)	1992	(Greece) Panionios	Free	1997
Michalis Kasapis	(Greece)	LB / LM	6 August 1971 (aged 22)	1993	(Greece) Levadiakos	₯25,000,000	1998
Midfielders
Tasos Mitropoulos (Vice-captain 2)	(Greece)	AM / SS / ST	23 August 1957 (aged 36)	1992	(Greece) Olympiacos	Free	1994
Toni Savevski	(North Macedonia)	CM / LM / DM	14 July 1963 (aged 30)	1988	(North Macedonia) Vardar	₯34,000,000	1996
Refik Šabanadžović	(Bosnia and Herzegovina) (Federal Republic of Yugoslavia)	DM / CM / CB / RB	2 August 1965 (aged 28)	1991	(Federal Republic of Yugoslavia) Red Star Belgrade	₯18,700,000	1996
Stavros Stamatis	(Greece)	DM / CM / CB / RB / LB / AM	31 January 1966 (aged 28)	1988	(Greece) Charavgiakos	₯22,000,000	1996
Vasilios Tsiartas	(Greece)	AM / RM / LM / SS	12 November 1972 (aged 21)	1992	(Greece) Naoussa	₯70,000,000	1997
Pantelis Konstantinidis	(Greece)	LM / LW / LB	16 August 1975 (aged 18)	1993	(Greece) PAS Florina	₯9,000,000	1998
Forwards
Vasilis Dimitriadis (Captain)	(Greece)	ST	1 February 1966 (aged 28)	1991	(Greece) Aris	₯95,000,000	1996
Zoran Slišković	(Croatia)	ST / SS	1 March 1966 (aged 28)	1992	(Croatia) HAŠK Građanski	₯60,000,000	1995
Alexis Alexandris (Vice-captain)	(Greece)	ST / RW	21 October 1968 (aged 24)	1991	(Greece) Veria	₯45,000,000	1994
Samouil Drakopulos	(Switzerland) (Greece)	ST / RW	31 July 1974 (aged 19)	1992	(Switzerland) Grasshopper	₯55,000,000	1996
Left during Winter Transfer Window
Andreas Theodoropoulos	(Greece)	CB	27 June 1971 (aged 23)	1993	(Greece) Proodeftiki	Free	1998
Frank Klopas	(United States) (Greece)	SS / ST / AM	1 September 1966 (aged 27)	1988	(United States) Chicago Sting	Free	1993

== Transfers ==
=== In ===
==== Summer ====
Pos.	Player	From	Fee	Date	Contract Until	Source
GK	(Greece) Vasilis Karagiannis	(Greece) Diagoras	₯20,000,000	1 July 1993	30 June 1998	
DF	(Greece) Michalis Vlachos	(Greece) Olympiacos	Free transfer	1 July 1993	30 June 1995	
DF	(Greece) Andreas Theodoropoulos	(Greece) Proodeftiki	Free transfer	29 June 1993	30 June 1998	
DF	(Greece) Vasilios Borbokis	(Greece) Apollon Kalamarias	Free transfer	1 July 1993	30 June 1997	
DF	(Greece) Michalis Kasapis	(Greece) Levadiakos	₯25,000,000	23 June 1993	30 June 1998	
MF	(Greece) Nikos Ladogiannis	(Greece) Charavgiakos	Loan return	1 July 1993	30 June 1996	
MF	(Greece) Pantelis Konstantinidis	(Greece) PAS Florina	₯9,000,000	8 July 1993	30 June 1998	
FW	(Greece) Georgios Christodoulou	(Cyprus) Pezoporikos	Loan return	1 July 1993	30 June 1993	
FW	(Greece) Giorgos Kakousios	(Greece) Diagoras	Loan return	1 July 1993	30 June 1994	

==== Winter ====
Pos.	Player	From	Fee	Date	Contract Until	Source
DF	(Greece) Georgios Theodoridis	(Greece) Pierikos	Loan return	1 December 1993	30 June 1995	

=== Out ===
==== Summer ====
Pos.	Player	To	Fee	Date	Source
GK	(Greece) Antonis Minou	(Greece) Apollon Athens	End of contract	9 July 1993	
DF	(Greece) Takis Karagiozopoulos	(Greece) Apollon Athens	End of contract	9 July 1993	
DF	(Greece) Christos Vasilopoulos	(Greece) Kalamata	End of contract	15 July 1993	
MF	(Greece) Pavlos Papaioannou	(Greece) Kalamata	End of contract	13 July 1993	
MF	(Greece) Nikos Ladogiannis	(Greece) Ilisiakos	Free transfer	1 July 1993	
MF	(Greece) Lampros Georgiadis	(Greece) Kalamata	Contract termination	15 July 1993	
FW	(Greece) Georgios Christodoulou	Free agent	End of contract	1 July 1993	

==== Winter ====
Pos.	Player	To	Fee	Date	Source
FW	(United States) Frank Klopas	(United States) US Soccer Federation	End of contract	1 December 1993	

=== Loan out ===
==== Summer ====
Pos.	Player	To	Fee	Date	Until	Option to buy	Source
FW	(Greece) Giorgos Kakousios	(Greece) Ethnikos Asteras	Free	16 July 1993	30 June 1994	✗	

==== Winter ====
Pos.	Player	To	Fee	Date	Until	Option to buy	Source
DF	(Greece) Georgios Theodoridis	(Greece) Edessaikos	Free	2 December 1993	30 June 1994	✗	
DF	(Greece) Andreas Theodoropoulos	(Greece) Proodeftiki	Free	4 December 1993	30 November 1994	✗	

=== Contract renewals ===
Pos.	Player	Date	Former Exp. Date	New Exp. Date	Source
DF	(Greece) Stelios Manolas	19 November 1993	30 November 1993	30 June 1995	
MF	(Federal Republic of Yugoslavia) Refik Šabanadžović	1 July 1993	30 June 1994	30 June 1996	
MF	(Greece) Stavros Stamatis	1 December 1993	30 November 1993	30 November 1996	
MF	(North Macedonia) Toni Savevski	6 July 1993	30 June 1993	30 June 1996	

=== Overall transfer activity ===
==== Expenditure ====
Summer: ▼ ₯54,000,000

Winter: ▼ ₯0

Total: ▼ ₯54,000,000

==== Income ====
Summer: ▲ ₯0

Winter: ▲ ₯0

Total: ▲ ₯0

==== Net Totals ====
Summer: ▼ ₯54,000,000

Winter: ₯0

Total: ▼ ₯54,000,000

== Pre-season and friendlies ==
18 July 1993 Friendly	Zeus Nürnberg	0–5	AEK Athens	Nuremberg
18:00 EEST (UTC+3)		Report	Vaios Karagiannis (yellow card); Slišković 25', 36'; Savevski 42'; Mitropoulos 60'; Agorogiannis 72'	Attendance: 2,000

21 July 1993 Friendly	1860 Munich	1–2	AEK Athens	Munich
20:00 EEST (UTC+3)	Winkler 30'	Report	Kopitsis 26'; Vlachos (yellow card) ?' (yellow-red card) 29'; Dimitriadis 46'; Mitropoulos (red card) 90'	Stadium: Grünwalder Stadion; Attendance: 5,000

24 July 1993 Friendly	Braunau	1–3	AEK Athens	Braunau am Inn
19:00 EEST (UTC+3)	Hrstic 80'	Report	Alexandris 26'; Theodoropoulos 34'; Tsiartas 76'	Stadium: Grenzlandstadion Braunau; Attendance: 2,000

26 July 1993 Friendly	Bianeck	0–10	AEK Athens	Tegernsee
19:00 EEST (UTC+3)		Report	Dimitriadis 9', 44'; Alexandris 36', 39'; Manolas 30'; Vlachos 60'; Mitropoulos 73', 75'; Stamatis 84'; Tsartas 87'

2 August 1993 Friendly	AEK Athens	2–0	Aris	Nea Filadelfeia
21:00 EEST (UTC+3)	Dimitriadis 5' (pen.); Manolas 21'	Report	Sapountzis (yellow card); Lekbello (yellow card)	Stadium: Nikos Goumas Stadium; Attendance: 6,871; Referee: Theodoros Kefalas (Athens)

4 August 1993 Friendly	AEK Athens	1–0	Edessaikos	Nea Filadelfeia
21:00 EEST (UTC+3)	Kopitsis (yellow card); Savevski 29'	Report		Stadium: Nikos Goumas Stadium; Attendance: 2,424; Referee: Dimitris Koumasis (Athens)

9 August 1993 Friendly	Olympiacos	1–1	AEK Athens	Piraeus
21:00 EEST (UTC+3)	Karapialis (yellow card); Vaitsis 82', (yellow card)	Report	Vlachos (yellow card); Dimitriadis 56' (pen.)	Stadium: Karaiskakis Stadium; Attendance: 21,000; Referee: Vangelis Symiakos (Piraeus)

11 August 1993 Friendly	AEK Athens	2–1	Iraklis	Nea Filadelfeia
21:00 EEST (UTC+3)	Mitropoulos 63', 77'	Report	C. Kostis 36'	Stadium: Nikos Goumas Stadium; Attendance: 3,066; Referee: Giorgos Borovilos (Arcadia)

13 November 1993 Thomas Mavros Testimonial	AEK Athens	4–2	Greece	Nea Filadelfeia
18:00 EEST (UTC+3)	Mavros 19' (pen.), 33'; Vlachos 41'; Tsiartas 73' (pen.)	Report	Mavros 55' (pen.); Apostolakis 57'	Stadium: Nikos Goumas Stadium; Attendance: 7,000; Referee: Stavros Zakestidis (Thessaloniki)
Note: Friendly match in honor of Thomas Mavros, who retired 2.5 years ago. AEK played with many substitutes in their squad, since most of their regular players were included in Greece's squad and played against them. Mavros played with the yellow-blacks for the first time since 1987, while he was also honored for his contribution in football by AEK, the HFF and the state. Mavros played a half with each team, while at the 62nd minute he was replaced by Nikos Machlas and faced the worship of the crowd.

9 May 1994 Friendly	AEK Athens	2–0	Panionios	Nea Filadelfeia
18:00 EEST (UTC+3)	Drakopulos 75', 90'	Report		Stadium: Nikos Goumas Stadium; Attendance: 200; Referee: Giannis Spathas (Piraeus)

13 May 1994 Thraki Cup	Portsmouth	4–4 (5–3 p)	AEK Athens	Xanthi
17:30 EEST (UTC+3)	Hall (yellow card); Gittens (yellow card); Doling (yellow card); Creaney (yellow card) (goal) 74' (pen.), 81', 88'; Powell 76'	Report	Papadopoulos (yellow card); Lukić 15'; Slišković 24', 57', 69'	Stadium: A.O. Xanthi Stadium; Attendance: 993; Referee: Vassilios Nikakis (Aetoloacarnania)
	Penalties
	Creaney (penalty scored); Chamberlain (penalty scored); Kristensen (penalty scored); Pethick (penalty scored); Stimson (penalty scored)		(penalty missed) Kasapis; (penalty scored) Stamatis; (penalty scored) Agorogiannis; (penalty scored) Borbokis

14 May 1994 Thraki Cup	Skoda Xanthi	5–4	AEK Athens	Xanthi
	Zikos 10'; Marcelo 36', 84'; Tengelidis 81'; Pano 90'	Report	Papadopoulos 8'; Slišković 39'; Borbokis 54'; Savevski 58'	Stadium: A.O. Xanthi Stadium; Attendance: 1,300; Referee: Sotiris Vorgias (Athens)

19 May 1994 Friendly	AEK Athens	8–0	AO Nea Filadelfeia	Nea Filadelfeia
18:00 EEST (UTC+3)	Tsiartas; Konstaninidis; Borbokis; Koutoulas; Drakopulos	Report		Stadium: Nikos Goumas Stadium

23 May 1994 Friendly	Mytilene XI	2–7	AEK Athens	Mytilene
	Gavalas 29'; Vavoulas 57'	Report	Papadopoulos 4'; Tsiartas 40' (pen.); Borbokis 52'; Karalagas 56'; Agorogiannis 59'; Konstaninidis 67'; Savevski 86'	Stadium: Mytilene Municipal Stadium

== Competitions ==
=== Overall record ===
Competition	First match	Last match	Starting round	Final position	Record							
Competition	First match	Last match	Starting round	Final position	Pld	W	D	L	GF	GA	GD	Win %
Alpha Ethniki	22 August 1993	24 April 1994	Matchday 1	Winners	34	25	4	5	63	28	+35	73.53
Greek Cup	25 August 1993	20 April 1994	Group Stage	Runners-up	12	7	5	0	35	11	+24	58.33
Greek Super Cup	18 August 1993		Final	Runners-up	1	0	0	1	0	1	−1	0.00
UEFA Champions League	15 September 1993	29 September 1993	First round	First round	2	0	1	1	1	2	−1	0.00
Total					49	32	10	7	99	42	+57	65.31

Last updated: 24 April 1994
Source: Competitions

=== Alpha Ethniki ===
==== League table ====
Pos	Team	Pld	W	D	L	GF	GA	GD	Pts	Qualification or relegation
1	AEK Athens (C)	34	25	4	5	63	28	+35	79	Qualification for Champions League qualifying round
2	Panathinaikos	34	22	6	6	82	32	+50	72	Qualification for Cup Winners' Cup first round
3	Olympiacos	34	18	14	2	63	27	+36	68	Qualification for UEFA Cup first round
4	Aris	34	18	9	7	55	34	+21	63	Qualification for UEFA Cup preliminary round
5	PAOK	34	14	9	11	45	38	+7	51	

Source: RSSSF
Rules for classification: 1st points; 2nd head-to-head points; 3rd head-to-head goal difference; 4th decision match.
(C) Champions

==== Results summary ====
Overall								Home						Away					
Pld	W	D	L	GF	GA	GD	Pts	W	D	L	GF	GA	GD	W	D	L	GF	GA	GD
34	25	4	5	63	28	+35	79	15	1	1	41	13	+28	10	3	4	22	15	+7

==== Results by Matchday ====
Round	1	2	3	4	5	6	7	8	9	10	11	12	13	14	15	16	17	18	19	20	21	22	23	24	25	26	27	28	29	30	31	32	33	34
Ground	A	H	A	A	H	A	H	A	H	A	H	H	A	H	A	H	A	H	A	H	H	A	H	A	H	A	H	A	A	H	A	H	A	H
Result	W	W	D	W	W	D	W	W	L	W	W	W	D	W	L	W	W	W	W	W	W	L	W	L	W	L	W	W	W	W	W	D	W	W
Position	5	1	3	1	1	1	2	1	2	1	1	1	1	1	1	1	1	1	1	1	1	1	1	1	1	1	1	1	1	1	1	1	1	1

Source: Competitive matches
A = Away; H = Home; W = Win; D = Draw; L = Loss; P = Postponed

==== Matches ====
22 August 1993 1	Levadiakos	0–1	AEK Athens	Livadeia
18:00 EEST (UTC+3)	Kyrilidis (yellow card); Goulis (yellow card)		Dimitriadis (yellow card); Papadopoulos (yellow card); Alexandris 51'	Stadium: Levadia Municipal Stadium; Attendance: 3,559; Referee: Nikos Perakis (Athens)
Note: The match was scheduled to begin at 17:30 and with Giorgos Bikas as referee. However, Bikas did not show up, due to the strike of the referees. Eventually the game officials called from the speakers of the pitch, for referees who went to watch the match and found three. With the agreement of the chairmen both clubs, it was decided to kick off at 18:00 with Nikos Perakis as referee.

29 August 1993 2	AEK Athens	4–0	Apollon Athens	Nea Filadelfeia
21:00 EEST (UTC+3)	Šabanadžović (yellow card); Dimitriadis 10' (pen.), 82'; Kasapis 26'; Agorogiannis 88'		Kovačević (yellow card); Karasavvidis (yellow card); Alexis (yellow card)	Stadium: Nikos Goumas Stadium; Attendance: 14,913; Referee: Vangelis Symiakos (Piraeus)

5 September 1993 3	AEL	0–0	AEK Athens	Larissa
	Mangos (yellow card); Ziakas (yellow card)		Vlachos (yellow card); Manolas (yellow card) 40'	Stadium: Alcazar Stadium; Attendance: 9,369; Referee: Konstantinos Karapatas (Corinthia)

11 September 1993 4	Panathinaikos	1–2	AEK Athens	Marousi
20:30 EEST (UTC+3)	Christodoulou (yellow card); Mavridis (yellow card); Antoniou (yellow card); Warzycha 17'		Savevski (yellow card); Slišković (yellow card); Manolas (yellow card); Vaios Karagiannis (yellow card) 8' (yellow-red card) 59'; Dimitriadis 10'; Alexandris 46'	Stadium: Olympic Stadium; Attendance: 30,257; Referee: Andreas Sakellariou (Patra)

19 September 1993 5	AEK Athens	3–0	Aris	Nea Filadelfeia
21:00 EEST (UTC+3)	Dimitriadis (penalty missed) 16', 26' (pen.); Lekbello 32' (o.g.); Šabanadžović (yellow card) 38' (yellow-red card) 83'; Koutoulas (yellow card) 45+1'; Alexandris 65' (pen.); Savevski (yellow card) 66'		Lončar (yellow card) 30'; Samolis (penalty missed) 45+2'; Ivan (yellow card) 83'	Stadium: Nikos Goumas Stadium; Attendance: 8,565; Referee: Giannis Latsios (Larissa)

25 September 1993 6	PAOK	0–0	AEK Athens	Thessaloniki
21:00 EEST (UTC+3)	Anastasiadis (yellow card)		Vaios Karagiannis (yellow card)	Stadium: Toumba Stadium; Attendance: 11,248; Referee: Giannis Dermetzoglou (Alexandroupoli)

3 October 1993 7	AEK Athens	3–2	Athinaikos	Nea Filadelfeia
16:00 EEST (UTC+3)	Slišković 9', (yellow card); Alexandris 50'; Dimitriadis 64'		Theodorakos (yellow card); Chatziangelis (yellow card); Kaçaj 1'; Patikas 84'	Stadium: Nikos Goumas Stadium; Attendance: 6,986; Referee: Vangelis Pouflis (Pella)

17 October 1993 8	Panachaiki	0–2	AEK Athens	Patras
15:30 EEST (UTC+3)	Iliadis (yellow card)		Slišković 19', (yellow card); Alexandris 56'	Stadium: Kostas Davourlis Stadium; Attendance: 7,333; Referee: Tasos Lefakis (Chania)

1 December 1993 9	AEK Athens	1–2	Olympiacos	Nea Filadelfeia
15:00 EET (UTC+2)	Vlachos (yellow card); Agorogiannis 85'		Kalantzis (yellow card) (yellow-red card) 81'; Pachatouridis (yellow card); Hantzidis (yellow card); Protasov 20', (yellow card); Christensen 40'	Stadium: Nikos Goumas Stadium; Attendance: 10,449; Referee: Markos Zabetakis (Thessaloniki)
Note: The game originally took place on 24/10/1993 but was interrupted in the 83rd minute, due an interruption of electric power, while the score was 1-1.

31 October 1993 10	Naoussa	1–3	AEK Athens	Naousa
15:00 EET (UTC+2)	Iakovidis (yellow card); Troupkos (yellow card); Sapanis 33'		Kasapis (yellow card); Savevski (yellow card); Dimitriadis 2', (penalty missed) 4', (penalty missed) 44'; Alexandris 4'; Tsiartas 76'	Stadium: Municipal Stadium of Naousa; Attendance: 3,061; Referee: Christos Savvas (Kozani)

7 November 1993 11	AEK Athens	2–1	Iraklis	Nea Filadelfeia
17:15 EET (UTC+2)	Kasapis (yellow card); Manolas (yellow card); Vlachos 79', (yellow card); Tsiartas 80'		Erak (yellow card); Jovanović (yellow card); Toutziaris 36'	Stadium: Nikos Goumas Stadium; Attendance: 7,648; Referee: Thanasis Vellios (Xanthi)

21 November 1993 12	AEK Athens	3–1	Doxa Drama	Nea Filadelfeia
15:00 EET (UTC+2)	Borbokis (yellow card); Manolas (yellow card); Alexandris 27', 39'; Savevski 44'		Giaslanis (yellow card); Kalpakis (yellow card); Leković (yellow card); Pachatouridis (yellow card); Georgiadis 48' (pen.)	Stadium: Nikos Goumas Stadium; Attendance: 4,154; Referee: Michalis Kalathenos (Dodecanese)

27 November 1993 13	Panionios	2–2	AEK Athens	Nea Smyrni
15:00 EET (UTC+2)	Kourbanas (yellow card); Tzanetis (yellow card); Togias (yellow card); Famelis (yellow card) 30', (goal) 40'; Pantić 89'		Manolas (red card) 28'; Dimitriadis (yellow card) 28'; Savevski 42', (yellow card); Borbokis 73'	Stadium: Nea Smyrni Stadium; Attendance: 2,727; Referee: Giorgos Plevritis (Thessaloniki)

5 December 1993 14	AEK Athens	4–1	Edessaikos	Nea Filadelfeia
15:00 EET (UTC+2)	Kasapis 16'; Manolas 36'; Šabanadžović (red card) 37'; Dimitriadis 59'; Stamatis 90'		Škara 35' (pen.); Charalampous (yellow card) 63'; Kotsyfas (yellow card) 65'	Stadium: Nikos Goumas Stadium; Attendance: 6,748; Referee: Andreas Sakellariou (Patra)

11 December 1993 15	Skoda Xanthi	1–0	AEK Athens	Xanthi
14:45 EET (UTC+2)	Mitev (yellow card); Karageorgiou (yellow card); Chalkidis (yellow card); Vryzas (yellow card); Tengelidis (yellow card); Marcelo 22'		Dimitriadis (yellow card)	Stadium: A.O. Xanthi Stadium; Attendance: 4,992; Referee: Thanasis Zachariadis (Thessaloniki)

19 December 1993 16	AEK Athens	3–0	Apollon Kalamarias	Nea Filadelfeia
15:00 EET (UTC+2)	Dimitriadis (penalty missed) 7', 42'; Alexandris 66'; Tsiartas 83'			Stadium: Nikos Goumas Stadium; Attendance: 8,199; Referee: Ilias Doutsias (Piraeus)

22 December 1993 17	OFI	1–2	AEK Athens	Heraklion
18:15 EET (UTC+2)	Velić (yellow card); Alexoudis 33', (yellow card)		Vlachos (yellow card); Kasapis (yellow card); Manolas (yellow card); Alexandris 71'; Slišković 79', (yellow card)	Stadium: Theodoros Vardinogiannis Stadium; Attendance: 4,305; Referee: Giorgos Bikas (Chalkidiki)

5 January 1994 18	AEK Athens	2–1	Levadiakos	Nea Filadelfeia
15:00 EET (UTC+2)	Slišković (yellow card); Alexandris 58' (pen.), 63'		Tsanas (yellow card); Goulis (yellow card); Theocharis (yellow card); Jakovljevic 36', (yellow card)	Stadium: Nikos Goumas Stadium; Attendance: 7,775; Referee: Vasilis Krastanas (Thessaloniki)

7 January 1995 19	Apollon Athens	1–3	AEK Athens	Rizoupoli
15:00 EET (UTC+2)	Karagiozopoulos (yellow card); Đurđević 52'		Šabanadžović (yellow card); Alexandris 30', 73'; Manolas 53'	Stadium: Rizoupoli Stadium; Attendance: 6,572; Referee: Thanasis Briakos (Epirus)

16 January 1994 20	AEK Athens	1–0	AEL	Nea Filadelfeia
15:00 EET (UTC+2)	Vaios Karagiannis (yellow card) 28'; Alexandris 84' (pen.); Tsiartas (yellow card) 87'; Mitropoulos (red card) 90+1'		Ziakas (yellow card) 26'; Providas (yellow card) 30' (yellow-red card) 89'; Mouratidis (yellow card); Tsoukalis (red card) 87'	Stadium: Nikos Goumas Stadium; Attendance: 13,085; Referee: Sotiris Bazas (Phthiotis)

23 January 1994 21	AEK Athens	2–0	Panathinaikos	Nea Filadelfeia
17:30 EET (UTC+2)	Vaios Karagiannis (yellow card); Vlachos (yellow card); Slišković (yellow card); Mitropoulos (yellow card); Kopitsis 75'; Alexandris 84'		Saravakos (yellow card); Kolitsidakis (yellow card); Kalitzakis (yellow card) 20'	Stadium: Nikos Goumas Stadium; Attendance: 17,445; Referee: Thanasis Zachariadis (Thessaloniki)

30 January 1994 22	Aris	2–0	AEK Athens	Thessaloniki
17:30 EET (UTC+2)	Labriakos 76'; Chrisostomidis 87'			Stadium: Aris Stadium; Attendance: 13,241; Referee: Ilias Doutsias (Piraeus)

6 February 1994 23	AEK Athens	2–0	PAOK	Nea Filadelfeia
17:45 EET (UTC+2)	Vaios Karagiannis (yellow card); Kasapis 44'; Savevski 64'		Kapetanopoulos (yellow card); Lagonidis (yellow card); Zagorakis (yellow card); Panagiotidis (yellow card)	Stadium: Nikos Goumas Stadium; Attendance: 9,479; Referee: Michalis Kalathenos (Dodecanese)

12 February 1994 24	Athinaikos	1–0	AEK Athens	Vyronas
15:30 EET (UTC+2)	Bong 6', (yellow card) 33'; Theodorakos (yellow card) 13'; Boutzoukas (yellow card) 14'; Mavromatis (yellow card) 42'; Thanopoulos (yellow card) 48'; Kaçaj (yellow card) 58'; Tzalakostas (yellow card) 73'; Tsironis (yellow card) 76'; Dafkos (yellow card) 79'		Vlachos (yellow card) 9' (yellow-red card) 40'; Alexandris (penalty missed) 60'	Stadium: Vyronas National Stadium; Attendance: 2,813; Referee: Giannis Papageorgiou (Athens)

20 February 1994 25	AEK Athens	2–0	Panachaiki	Nea Filadelfeia
15:45 EET (UTC+2)	Dimitriadis 7'; Savevski 67'; Mitropoulos (yellow card) 72'		Karapitsos (yellow card); Argyropoulos (yellow card); Ferko (yellow card) 18'	Stadium: Nikos Goumas Stadium; Attendance: 8,979; Referee: Nikos Iliadis (Piraeus)

26 February 1994 26	Olympiacos	3–0	AEK Athens	Piraeus
16:15 EET (UTC+2)	Kalantzis (yellow card) 11' (yellow-red card) 76'; Christensen 25' (pen.), (red card) 71'; Amanatidis (yellow card) 40'; Tsalouchidis 68'; Sofianopoulos (yellow card) 90'; Batista 90+1'		Dimitriadis (yellow card) 23'; Savevski (yellow card) 62' (yellow-red card) 62'; Mitropoulos (yellow card) 71'	Stadium: Karaiskakis Stadium; Attendance: 24,575; Referee: Gerasimos Mazarakis (Kefalonia)

6 March 1994 27	AEK Athens	4–2	Naoussa	Nea Filadelfeia
15:45 EET (UTC+2)	V. Dimitriadis 18'; Stamatis 43'; Alexandris 51' (pen.), 55'		Katsouris (yellow card); G. Dimitriadis 57', (yellow card); Živković 63', (penalty missed) 78'	Stadium: Nikos Goumas Stadium; Attendance: 8,492; Referee: Savvas Chatzistavridis (Drama)

13 March 1994 28	Iraklis	0–1	AEK Athens	Thessaloniki
15:45 EET (UTC+2)			Slišković 58'; Šabanadžović (yellow card) 77'	Stadium: Kaftanzoglio Stadium; Attendance: 5,082; Referee: Vangelis Pouflis (Pella)

20 March 1994 29	Doxa Drama	1–3	AEK Athens	Drama
16:00 EET (UTC+2)	Aivazidis (yellow card) 59'; Alexandridis 73'		Manolas (yellow card) 4'; Slišković 74'; Mitropoulos (yellow card) 76'; Alexandris 83', 90+1'; Borbokis (yellow card) 87'	Stadium: Doxa Drama Stadium; Attendance: 3,554; Referee: Giorgos Borovilos (Arcadia)

27 March 1994 30	AEK Athens	1–0	Panionios	Nea Filadelfeia
17:00 EEST (UTC+3)	Alexandris 68' (pen.)		Abadiotakis (yellow card); Vokolos (yellow card); Kourbanas (yellow card); Famelis (yellow card); Refenes (red card) 67'	Stadium: Nikos Goumas Stadium; Attendance: 14,744; Referee: Giannis Papageorgiou (Athens)

3 April 1994 31	Edessaikos	0–1	AEK Athens	Edessa
17:15 EEST (UTC+3)	Tsoptsis (yellow card)		Slišković 20'	Stadium: Municipal Stadium of Edessa; Attendance: 4,556; Referee: Ilias Doutsias (Piraeus)

10 April 1994 32	AEK Athens	2–2	Skoda Xanthi	Nea Filadelfeia
17:00 EEST (UTC+3)	Manolas (yellow card); Borbokis 15'; Slišković 90', (yellow card)		Chalkidis (yellow card); Marcelo (yellow card) (yellow-red card) 90'; Samaras (yellow card); Záleský (yellow card); Karageorgiou (yellow card); Tengelidis 60'; Vryzas 70'	Stadium: Nikos Goumas Stadium; Attendance: 22,203; Referee: Andreas Sakellariou (Patra)

16 April 1994 33	Apollon Kalamarias	1–2	AEK Athens	Thessaloniki
17:15 EEST (UTC+3)	Kushta (yellow card) 21', (goal) 49'; Vlachoudis (yellow card) 83'		Vaios Karagiannis (yellow card) 21'; Alexandris 14', 28' (pen.); Slišković (yellow card) 54'; Borbokis (yellow card) 70'	Stadium: Kalamaria Stadium; Attendance: 2,412; Referee: Vangelis Symiakos (Piraeus)

24 April 1994 34	AEK Athens	2–1	OFI	Nea Filadelfeia
21:00 EEST (UTC+3)	Alexandris 20'; Dimitriadis 28'		Moustakidis (yellow card) 31'; Athanasiadis 54'	Stadium: Nikos Goumas Stadium; Attendance: 16,353; Referee: Spyros Papadakos (Laconia)

=== Greek Cup ===
==== Group 14 ====
Pos	Team	Pld	W	D	L	GF	GA	GD	Pts	Qualification	AEK	PAN	NIK	KER
1	AEK Athens	3	2	1	0	11	2	+9	7	Round of 32		2–2	—	—
2	Panathinaikos	3	2	1	0	8	2	+6	7	Round of 32	—		1–0	5–0
3	Niki Volos	3	0	1	2	3	6	−3	1		0–2	—		—
4	Keratsini	3	0	1	2	3	15	−12	1		0–7	—	3–3	

Source: epo.gr

==== Matches ====
25 August 1993 1	Keratsini	0–7	AEK Athens	Piraeus
		Report	Stamatis 17', 87'; Alexandris 30', 36', 53' (pen.); Slišković 80'; Konstantinidis 88'	Stadium: Karaiskakis Stadium; Referee: Babis Rigas (Athens)
Note: Vassilios Nikakis was appointed as a referee the match but did not show up due the strike of the referees. The captains of both teams called from the loudspeakers if there is a referee on the stadium and Babis Rigas came in.

1 September 1993 2	Niki Volos	0–2	AEK Athens	Volos
20:30 EEST (UTC+3)		Report	Borbokis (yellow card); Slišković 29'; Papadopoulos 81'	Stadium: Pantelis Magoulas Stadium; Referee: Vassilios Nikakis (Aetoloacarnania)

8 September 1993 3	AEK Athens	2–2	Panathinaikos	Nea Filadelfeia
20:30 EEST (UTC+3)	Papadopoulos (yellow card); Slišković 27', 88'; Manolas (yellow card) 34'	Report	Kapouranis (yellow card); Giotsas 33'; Markos 44'	Stadium: Nikos Goumas Stadium; Attendance: 6,344; Referee: Vasilis Krastanas (Thessaloniki)

===== Round of 32 =====
27 October 1993 First leg	Paniliakos	0–0	AEK Athens	Pyrgos
15:00 EEST (UTC+3)		Report		Stadium: Pyrgos Stadium; Attendance: 6,000; Referee: Konstantinos Karapatas (Corinthia)

10 November 1993 Second leg	AEK Athens	6–3 (6–3 agg.)	Paniliakos	Nea Filadelfeia
14:30 EET (UTC+2)	Tsiartas 20'; Borbokis 26'; Manolas 28'; Stamatis 59', 75'; Mitropoulos 74'; Šabanadžović (yellow card) 88'	Report	Liris (yellow card) 13'; Đorđević 16'; Vasilopoulos (yellow card) 18'; Papanikolaou 82'; Tsiolis 86'	Stadium: Nikos Goumas Stadium; Attendance: 2,009; Referee: Spyros Papadakos (Laconia)

===== Round of 16 =====
15 December 1993 First leg	AEK Athens	4–0	Asteras Ambelokipoi	Nea Filadelfeia
14:45 EET (UTC+2)	Slišković 32'; Tsartas 39', 43'; Stamatis 69'	Report		Stadium: Nikos Goumas Stadium; Referee: Spyros Papadakos (Laconia)

29 December 1993 Second leg	Asteras Ambelokipoi	1–7 (1–11 agg.)	AEK Athens	Thessaloniki
14:15 EET (UTC+2)	Nasiopoulos 89'	Report	Dimitriadis 23' (pen.); Slišković 30', 33', 65', 73'; Tsartas 55', 60'	Stadium: Ampelokipoi-Menemeni Stadium; Attendance: 2,000; Referee: Konstantinos Karapatas (Corinthia)

===== Quarter-finals =====
19 January 1994 First leg	AEL	0–1	AEK Athens	Larissa
15:00 EET (UTC+2)	Delopoulos (yellow card) 68'; Kolomitrousis (penalty missed) 74'	Report	Kopitsis 25'; Atmatsidis (yellow card) 41'; Agorogiannis (yellow card) 69'; Stamatis (yellow card) 74'	Stadium: Alcazar Stadium; Attendance: 7,797; Referee: Michalis Kalathenos (Dodecanese)

2 February 1994 Second leg	AEK Athens	1–1 (a.e.t.) (2–1 agg.)	AEL	Nea Filadelfeia
14:45 EET (UTC+2)	Vlachos (yellow card); Kasapis (yellow card); Savevski 114'	Report	Kolomitrousis (yellow card); Taxiarchis (yellow card); Tsoukalis (yellow card); Mouratidis (yellow card); Da Silva 14'	Stadium: Nikos Goumas Stadium; Attendance: 4,554; Referee: Spyros Papadakos (Laconia)

===== Semi-finals =====
2 March 1994 First leg	Aris	0–0	AEK Athens	Thessaloniki
15:45 EET (UTC+2)	Stamatis (yellow card) 29'; Atmatsidis (yellow card) 86'	Report	Samolis (yellow card) 45'	Stadium: Aris Stadium; Attendance: 13,565; Referee: Ilias Doutsias (Piraeus)

16 March 1994 Second leg	AEK Athens	2–1 (2–1 agg.)	Aris	Nea Filadelfeia
15:15 EET (UTC+2)	Dimitriadis (yellow card) 5'; Vlachos (yellow card) 20'; Stamatis (yellow card) 39' (yellow-red card) 82'; Slišković 64'; Alexandris 78'	Report	Samolis (yellow card) 4'; Karkamanis (yellow card) 6'; Stratilatis (yellow card) 8'; Konstantinidis (yellow card) 73'; Ivan (yellow card) 75'; Kofidis 84'; Iosifidis (yellow card) 85'	Stadium: Nikos Goumas Stadium; Attendance: 16,763; Referee: Spyros Papadakos (Laconia)

===== Final =====
20 April 1994 Final	Panathinaikos	3–3 (a.e.t.) (4–2 p)	AEK Athens	Marousi
20:15 EEST (UTC+3)	Warzycha 32'; Manolas 54' (o.g.); Kalitzakis (yellow card) 99'; Markos 116'	Report	Vlachos (yellow card) 35'; Manolas (yellow card) 45+1'; Alexandris 72', 95'; Dimitriadis (yellow card) 73', (goal) 77'	Stadium: Olympic Stadium; Attendance: 61,232; Referee: Giannis Spathas (Piraeus)
	Penalties
	Christodoulou (penalty scored); Georgiadis (penalty scored); Ouzounidis (penalty scored); Marangos (penalty missed); Apostolakis (penalty scored)		(penalty scored) Savevski; (penalty scored) Alexandris; (penalty missed) Tsiartas; (penalty missed) Dimitriadis

=== Greek Super Cup ===
18 August 1993 Final	AEK Athens	0–1	Panathinaikos	Marousi
21:00 EEST (UTC+3)	Kasapis (yellow card) 9'; Atmatsidis (yellow card) 55'	Report	Saravakos 22'; Nioplias (yellow card) 39'; Apostolakis (yellow card) 71'	Stadium: Olympic Stadium; Attendance: 35,000; Referee: Vassilios Nikakis (Aetoloacarnania)

=== UEFA Champions League ===
==== First round ====
The draw for the first round was held on 14 July 1993.

15 September 1993 First leg	Monaco (France)	1–0	(Greece) AEK Athens	Fontvieille, Monaco
21:30 EEST (UTC+3)	Vlachos 87' (o.g.); Dumas (yellow card) 88'	Report	Slišković (yellow card) 62'	Stadium: Stade Louis II; Attendance: 7,344; Referee: Manuel Díaz Vega (Spain)

29 September 1993 Second leg	AEK Athens (Greece)	1–1 (1–2 agg.)	(France) Monaco	Athens, Greece
21:00 EEST (UTC+3)	Slišković 12'; Vaios Karagiannis (yellow card) 17'; Vlachos (yellow card) 31'	Report	Djorkaeff 5'; Dumas (yellow card) 21'	Stadium: Nikos Goumas Stadium; Attendance: 22,982; Referee: John Blankenstein (Netherlands)

== Statistics ==
=== Squad statistics ===
As of 24 April 1994

No.	Pos	Player	Alpha Ethniki		Greek Cup		Greek Super Cup		Champions League		Total	
No.	Pos	Player	Apps	Goals	Apps	Goals	Apps	Goals	Apps	Goals	Apps	Goals
Goalkeepers
—	GK	(Greece) Spyros Ikonomopoulos	0	0	2	0	0	0	0	0	2	0
—	GK	(Greece) Ilias Atmatsidis	33	0	9	0	1	0	2	0	45	0
—	GK	(Greece) Vasilis Karagiannis	1	0	1	0	0	0	0	0	2	0
Defenders
—	DF	(Greece) Stelios Manolas	24	2	8	1	1	0	1	0	34	3
—	DF	(Greece) Georgios Agorogiannis	24	2	8	0	1	0	0	0	33	2
—	DF	(Greece) Georgios Koutoulas	12	0	8	0	0	0	1	0	21	0
—	DF	(Greece) Michalis Vlachos	26	1	8	0	0	0	2	0	36	1
—	DF	(Greece) Manolis Papadopoulos	10	0	5	1	1	0	0	0	16	1
—	DF	(Greece) Vaios Karagiannis	25	0	10	0	1	0	2	0	38	0
—	DF	(Greece) Vasilios Borbokis	24	2	9	1	0	0	0	0	33	3
—	DF	(Greece) Charis Kopitsis	11	1	11	1	0	0	2	0	24	2
—	DF	(Greece) Michalis Kasapis	29	3	7	0	1	0	2	0	39	3
Midfielders
—	MF	(Greece) Tasos Mitropoulos	29	0	5	1	1	0	2	0	37	1
—	MF	(North Macedonia) Toni Savevski	32	4	8	1	1	0	2	0	43	5
—	MF	(Republic of Bosnia and Herzegovina) Refik Šabanadžović	25	0	6	0	1	0	2	0	34	0
—	MF	(Greece) Stavros Stamatis	23	2	11	5	0	0	0	0	34	7
—	MF	(Greece) Vasilios Tsiartas	22	3	10	0	1	0	2	0	35	3
—	MF	(Greece) Pantelis Konstantinidis	0	0	1	1	0	0	2	0	3	1
Forwards
—	FW	(Greece) Vasilis Dimitriadis	33	11	8	2	1	0	2	0	44	13
—	FW	(Croatia) Zoran Slišković	26	7	9	10	1	0	2	1	38	18
—	FW	(Greece) Alexis Alexandris	32	24	8	6	1	0	2	0	43	30
—	FW	(Switzerland) Samouil Drakopulos	0	0	3	0	0	0	0	0	3	0
Left during Winter Transfer Window
—	DF	(Greece) Andreas Theodoropoulos	0	0	1	0	0	0	0	0	1	0
—	FW	(United States) Frank Klopas	0	0	0	0	0	0	0	0	0	0

=== Goalscorers ===
As of 24 April 1994
The list is sorted by competition order when total goals are equal, then by position and then alphabetically by surname.

Rank	Pos.	Player	Alpha Ethniki	Greek Cup	Greek Super Cup	Champions League	Total
1	FW	(Greece) Alexis Alexandris	24	6	0	0	30
2	FW	(Croatia) Zoran Slišković	7	10	0	1	18
3	FW	(Greece) Vasilis Dimitriadis	11	2	0	0	13
4	MF	(Greece) Stavros Stamatis	2	5	0	0	7
5	MF	(North Macedonia) Toni Savevski	4	1	0	0	5
6	DF	(Greece) Michalis Kasapis	3	0	0	0	3
6	MF	(Greece) Vasilios Tsiartas	3	0	0	0	3
6	DF	(Greece) Stelios Manolas	2	1	0	0	3
6	DF	(Greece) Vasilios Borbokis	2	1	0	0	3
10	DF	(Greece) Georgios Agorogiannis	2	0	0	0	2
10	DF	(Greece) Charis Kopitsis	1	1	0	0	2
12	DF	(Greece) Michalis Vlachos	1	0	0	0	1
12	DF	(Greece) Manolis Papadopoulos	0	1	0	0	1
12	MF	(Greece) Pantelis Konstantinidis	0	1	0	0	1
12	MF	(Greece) Tasos Mitropoulos	0	1	0	0	1
Own goals			1	0	0	0	1
Totals			63	30	0	1	94

=== Hat-tricks ===
Numbers in superscript represent the goals that the player scored.

Player	Against	Result	Date	Competition	Source
(Greece) Alexis Alexandris	(Greece) Keratsini	7–0 (A)	25 August 1993	Greek Cup	
(Croatia) Zoran Slišković^{4}	(Greece) Asteras Ambelokipoi	7–1 (A)	29 December 1993	Greek Cup	

=== Assists ===
As of 24 April 1994
The list is sorted by competition order when total assists are equal, then by position and then alphabetically by surname.

Rank	Pos.	Player	Alpha Ethniki	Greek Cup	Greek Super Cup	Champions League	Total
1	MF	(North Macedonia) Toni Savevski	9	5	0	0	14
2	MF	(Greece) Vasilios Tsiartas	6	4	0	0	10
3	DF	(Greece) Vasilios Borbokis	4	3	0	0	7
4	MF	(Greece) Tasos Mitropoulos	4	0	0	0	4
4	MF	(Greece) Stavros Stamatis	3	1	0	0	4
4	FW	(Greece) Vasilis Dimitriadis	3	0	0	1	4
4	DF	(Greece) Michalis Kasapis	2	2	0	0	4
4	FW	(Greece) Alexis Alexandris	2	2	0	0	4
4	DF	(Greece) Charis Kopitsis	1	3	0	0	4
10	DF	(Greece) Georgios Agorogiannis	3	0	0	0	3
10	DF	(Greece) Michalis Vlachos	1	2	0	0	3
12	DF	(Greece) Vaios Karagiannis	1	0	0	0	1
Totals			39	22	0	1	62

=== Clean sheets ===
The list is sorted by competition order when total clean sheets are equal and then alphabetically by surname. Clean sheets in games where both goalkeepers participated are awarded to the goalkeeper who started the game. Goalkeepers with no appearances are not included.

As of 24 April 1994

Rank	Player	Alpha Ethniki	Greek Cup	Greek Super Cup	Champions League	Total
1	(Greece) Ilias Atmatsidis	14	5	0	0	19
2	(Greece) Vasilis Karagiannis	0	1	0	0	1
3	(Greece) Spyros Ikonomopoulos	0	0	0	0	0
Totals		14	6	0	0	20

=== Disciplinary record ===
As of 24 April 1994

N	P	Nat.	Name	Alpha Ethniki			Greek Cup			Greek Super Cup			Champions League			Total			Notes
N	P	Nat.	Name	Yellow card	Second yellow card	Red card	Yellow card	Second yellow card	Red card	Yellow card	Second yellow card	Red card	Yellow card	Second yellow card	Red card	Yellow card	Second yellow card	Red card	Notes
Goalkeepers
—	GK	(Greece)	Spyros Ikonomopoulos																
—	GK	(Greece)	Ilias Atmatsidis				2			1						3			
—	GK	(Greece)	Vasilis Karagiannis																
Defenders
—	DF	(Greece)	Stelios Manolas	7		1	2									9		1	
—	DF	(Greece)	Georgios Agorogiannis				1									1			
—	DF	(Greece)	Georgios Koutoulas	1												1			
—	DF	(Greece)	Michalis Vlachos	6	1		3						1			10	1		
—	DF	(Greece)	Manolis Papadopoulos	1			1									2			
—	DF	(Greece)	Vaios Karagiannis	6	1								1			7	1		
—	DF	(Greece)	Vasilios Borbokis	3			1									4			
—	DF	(Greece)	Charis Kopitsis																
—	DF	(Greece)	Michalis Kasapis	3			1			1						5			
Midfielders
—	MF	(Greece)	Tasos Mitropoulos	4		1										4		1	
—	MF	(North Macedonia)	Toni Savevski	5	1											5	1		
—	MF	(Republic of Bosnia and Herzegovina)	Refik Šabanadžović	4	1	1	1									5	1	1	
—	MF	(Greece)	Stavros Stamatis				3	1								3	1		
—	MF	(Greece)	Vasilios Tsiartas																
—	MF	(Greece)	Pantelis Konstantinidis																
Forwards
—	FW	(Greece)	Vasilis Dimitriadis	4			1									5			
—	FW	(Croatia)	Zoran Slišković	8									1			9			
—	FW	(Greece)	Alexis Alexandris																
—	FW	(Switzerland)	Samouil Drakopulos																
Left during Winter Transfer window
—	DF	(Greece)	Andreas Theodoropoulos																
—	FW	(United States)	Frank Klopas																

=== Starting 11 ===
This section presents the most frequently used formation along with the players with the most starts across all competitions.

N.	Formation	Matchday(s)
49	4–3–3	1–34

Nat.	Player	Pos.
(Greece)	Ilias Atmatsidis	GK
(Greece)	Stelios Manolas (C)	RCB
(Greece)	Vaios Karagiannis	LCB
(Greece)	Georgios Agorogiannis	RB
(Greece)	Michalis Kasapis	LB
(Greece)	Michalis Vlachos	DM
(Bosnia and Herzegovina)	Refik Šabanadžović	RCM
(North Macedonia)	Toni Savevski	LCM
(Greece)	Alexis Alexandris	RW
(Croatia)	Zoran Slišković	LW
(Greece)	Vasilis Dimitriadis	CF

Last updated: 1994-04-24

== Awards ==
Player	Pos.	Award	Source
(Greece) Alexis Alexandris	FW	Alpha Ethiniki Top Scorer (shared)	
(Croatia) Zoran Slišković	FW	Greek Cup Top Scorer	
(Greece) Alexis Alexandris	FW	Greek Player of the Season	
(Greece) Michalis Kasapis	DF	Young Player of the Season (shared)	
(Bosnia and Herzegovina) Dušan Bajević	—	Foreign Manager of the Season	
