= 1995 Greek Football Cup final =

1995 Greek Cup final
- Event: 1994–95 Greek Football Cup
Panathinaikos	AEK Athens
1	0
- After extra time
- Date: 19 April 1995
- Venue: Olympic Stadium, Marousi, Athens
- Referee: Filippos Bakas (Thessaloniki)
- Attendance: 60,777

The 1995 Greek Cup final was the 51st final of the Greek Cup. The match took place on 19 April 1995 at the Olympic Stadium. The contesting teams were Panathinaikos and AEK Athens for a second time in row. It was Panathinaikos' twenty second Greek Cup final and third consecutive in their 87 years of existence and AEK Athens' fourtheenth Greek Cup final and second consecutive in their 71-year history. In contrast to the sensational last season's final of the two teams, this year's match was marked by incidents on and off the pitch, by the moment that the referee, Filippos Bakas awarded a penalty in favour of Panathinaikos a few minutes before the end of extra time. This event caused protests, expulsions and riots between fans of both teams with a total of 21 arrests by the police. Furthermore, certain footballers of AEK Athens denied to attend the title ceremony. Bakas managed to escape from the players of the yellow-blacks with a torn sleeve but a few days later a group of strangers attacked him in a street near to the airport of Elliniko. A couple of days after the final, the president of AEK, Melissanidis had a phone call with Bakas live on the TV. The referee told that Melissanidis knew who beat him with the president of AEK responding that the only thing he knew was that Bakas was showing off his "red underwear" all over the country.

== Venue ==
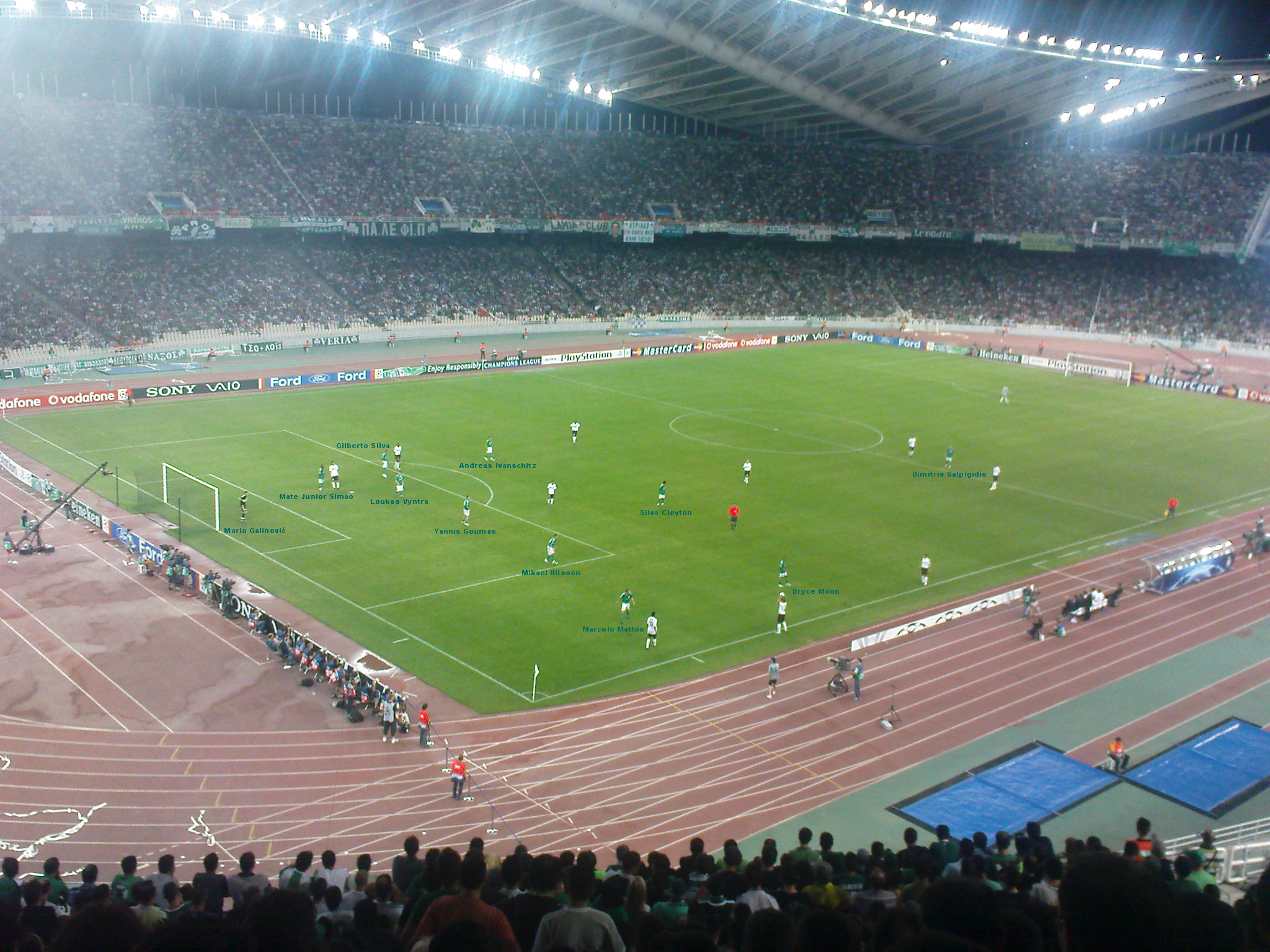
Athens Olympic Stadium.

This was the eleventh Greek Cup final held at the Athens Olympic Stadium, after the 1983, 1984, 1985, 1986, 1987, 1988, 1989, 1990, 1993 and 1994 finals.

The Athens Olympic Stadium was built in 1982. The stadium is used as a venue for Panathinaikos and Greece and was used for Olympiacos and AEK Athens on various occasions. Its current capacity is 80,000 and hosted two European Cup/UEFA Champions League finals in 1983 and 1994, a UEFA Cup Winners' Cup final in 1987 and the 1991 Mediterranean Games.

== Background ==
Panathinaikos had reached the Greek Cup final twenty one times, winning fourteen of them. The last time that they played in a final was in 1994, where they had won against AEK Athens by 4–2 on penalties, which came after a 0–0 draw at the end of the extra time.

AEK Athens had reached the Greek Cup final thirteen times, winning eight of them. The last time that they had won the Cup was in 1983 (2–0 against PAOK). The last time that had played in a final was in 1994, where they had lost to Panathinaikos by 4–2 on penalties, which came after a 0–0 draw at the end of the extra time.

The two teams had met each other in a Cup final three times in the 1948, 1949 and 1994 finals.

== Route to the final ==
Panathinaikos				Round	AEK Athens			
Opponent	Result			Group stage	Opponent	Result		
Anagennisi Giannitsa	Unknown			Matchday 1	Ethnikos Asteras	2–0 (A)		
Aiolikos	Unknown			Matchday 2	Panargiakos	1–0 (H)		
Sparti	Unknown			Matchday 3	Atromitos	4–0 (H)		
Acharnaikos	Unknown			Matchday 4	Kastoria	1–0 (A)		
Group 5 winners: Team / Pts; Panathinaikos / 12; Anagennisi Giannitsa / 9; Aiolikos / 6; Sparti / 3; Acharnaikos / 0				Final standings	Group 1 winners: Team / Pts; AEK Athens / 12; Panargiakos / 7; Atromitos / 6; Kastoria / 2; Ethnikos Asteras / 1			
Opponent	Agg.	1st leg	2nd leg	Knockout phase	Opponent	Agg.	1st leg	2nd leg
Apollon Athens	4–2	1–2 (H)	3–0 (A)	Round of 32	Doxa Vyronas	5–2	3–1 (A)	2–1 (H)
Skoda Xanthi	4–3	1–0 (H)	3–3 (a.e.t.) (A)	Round of 16	Panetolikos	9–1	4–1 (H)	5–0 (A)
Olympiacos	4–4 (a)	1–2 (H)	3–2 (A)	Quarter-finals	Ethnikos Piraeus	3–1	1–0 (A)	2–1 (H)
Kavala	4–2	1–0 (A)	5–0 (H)	Semi-finals	Athinaikos	2–0	1–0 (H)	1–0 (A)

== Match ==
=== Details ===
19 April 1995
20:00 EEST

Panathinaikos	1–0 (a.e.t.)	AEK Athens
Warzycha 118' (pen.)	Report (page 4)

Olympic Stadium, Marousi
Attendance: 60,777
Referee: Filippos Bakas (Thessaloniki)

Panathinaikos	ΑΕΚ Athens

GK	1	(Poland) Józef Wandzik
RB	2	(Greece) Stratos Apostolakis
CB	6	(Greece) Marinos Ouzounidis	(substituted off) 64'
CB	3	(Greece) Giannis Kalitzakis (c)
LB	4	(Greece) Giorgos Kapouranis
DM	5	(Greece) Dimitris Markos
CM	7	(Greece) Georgios Georgiadis
LM	10	(Greece) Nikos Nioplias
AM	8	(Argentina) Juan José Borrelli
RM	11	(Greece) Georgios Donis	(substituted off) 73'
CF	9	(Poland) Krzysztof Warzycha
Substitutes:
DF	13	(Greece) Thanasis Kolitsidakis	(substituted on) 64'
FW	16	(Greece) Alexis Alexoudis	(substituted on) 73'
Manager:
(Argentina) Juan Ramón Rocha

GK	1	(Greece) Ilias Atmatsidis
CB	4	(Greece) Stelios Manolas (c)	(red card) 115'
CB	3	(Greece) Manolis Papadopoulos
CB	6	(Greece) Michalis Vlachos	(red card) 115'
CM	5	(Bosnia and Herzegovina) Refik Šabanadžović		(substituted off) 117'
CM	8	(North Macedonia) Toni Savevski
RM	2	(Greece) Georgios Agorogiannis		(substituted off) 73'
AM	10	(Greece) Vasilios Tsiartas
LM	11	(Greece) Michalis Kasapis
SS	7	(Greece) Dimitris Saravakos
CF	9	(Greece) Vasilis Dimitriadis
Substitutes:
GK	15	(Greece) Vasilis Karagiannis
DF	14	(Greece) Georgios Koutoulas
DF	13	(Greece) Vaios Karagiannis
DF	16	(Greece) Vasilios Borbokis		(substituted on) 117'
MF	12	(Greece) Charis Kopitsis		(substituted on) 73'
Manager:
(Bosnia and Herzegovina) Dušan Bajević

Assistant referees:
Grigoris Kechagias (Thessaloniki)
Platonas Bozatzidis (Thessaloniki)

Match rules

- 90 minutes
- 30 minutes of extra time if necessary
- Penalty shootout if scores still level
- Five named substitutes
- Maximum of two substitutions

== See also ==
- 1994–95 Greek Football Cup
