= 1994 Greek Football Cup final =

1994 Greek Cup final
- Event: 1993–94 Greek Football Cup
Panathinaikos	AEK Athens
3	3
- After extra time Panathinaikos won 4–2 on penalties
- Date: 20 April 1994
- Venue: Olympic Stadium, Marousi, Athens
- Referee: Giannis Spathas (Piraeus)
- Attendance: 61,232

The 1994 Greek Cup final was the 50th final of the Greek Cup. The match took place on 20 April 1994 at the Olympic Stadium. The contesting teams were Panathinaikos and AEK Athens. It was Panathinaikos' twenty first Greek Cup final and second consecutive in their 86 years of existence and AEK Athens' thirteenth Greek Cup final in their 70-year history. A remarkable fact was that the 2 finalists were drawn in the same group at the start of the tournament. The match was characterized as one of the most sensational finals in history of the institution and was compared to the 1976 final. AEK Athens lost the chance to win the double, since they eventually won the championship.

== Venue ==
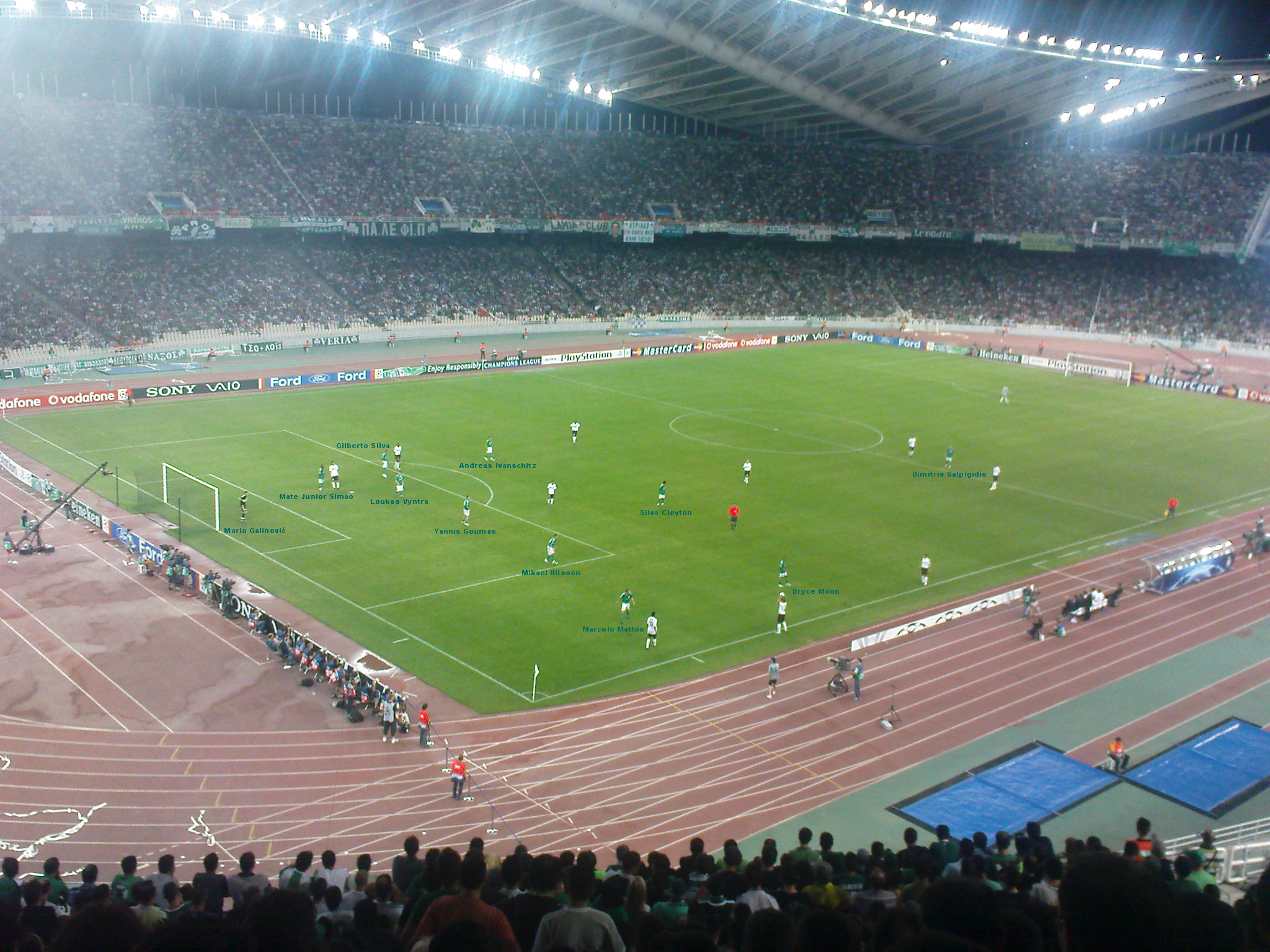
Athens Olympic Stadium.

This was the tenth Greek Cup final held at the Athens Olympic Stadium, after the 1983, 1984, 1985, 1986, 1987, 1988, 1989, 1990 and 1993 finals.

The Athens Olympic Stadium was built in 1982. The stadium is used as a venue for Panathinaikos and Greece and was used for Olympiacos and AEK Athens on various occasions. Its current capacity is 80,000 and hosted a European Cup/UEFA Champions League final in 1983 and will host the 1994 final, a European Cup Winners' Cup final in 1987 and the 1991 Mediterranean Games.

== Background ==
Panathinaikos had reached the Greek Cup final twenty times, winning thirteen of them. The last time that they played in a final was in 1993, where they had won against Olympiacos by 1–0.

AEK Athens had reached the Greek Cup final twelve times, winning seven of them. The last time that they had played in a final was in 1983, where they had won against PAOK by 2–0.

The two teams had met each other in a Cup final two times in the 1948 and 1949 finals.

== Route to the final ==
Panathinaikos				Round	AEK Athens			
Opponent	Result			Group stage	Opponent	Result		
Niki Volos	1–0 (H)			Matchday 1	Keratsini	7–0 (A)		
Keratsini	5–0 (H)			Matchday 2	Niki Volos	2–0 (A)		
AEK Athens	2–2 (A)			Matchday 3	Panathinaikos	2–2 (H)		
Group 14 runners-up: Team / Pts; AEK Athens / 7; Panathinaikos / 7; Niki Volos / 1; Keratsini / 1				Final standings	Group 14 winners: Team / Pts; AEK Athens / 7; Panathinaikos / 7; Niki Volos / 1; Keratsini / 1			
Opponent	Agg.	1st leg	2nd leg	Knockout phase	Opponent	Agg.	1st leg	2nd leg
OFI	5–3	5–1 (H)	0–2 (A)	Round of 32	Paniliakos	6–3	0–0 (A)	6–3 (H)
PAOK	4–3 (5–4 p)	0–0 (H)	0–0 (a.e.t.) (A)	Round of 16	Asteras Ambelokipoi	16–1	4–0 (H)	7–1 (A)
Ionikos	3–1	1–1 (H)	2–0 (A)	Quarter-finals	AEL	2–1	1–0 (A)	1–1 (a.e.t.) (H)
Iraklis	3–0	0–0 (A)	3–0 (H)	Semi-finals	Aris	2–1	0–0 (A)	2–1 (H)

== Match ==
=== Details ===
20 April 1994
20:15 EEST

Panathinaikos	3–3 (a.e.t.)	AEK Athens
Warzycha 32'; Manolas 54' (o.g.); Markos 116'	Report (pages 3,4)	Alexandris 72', 95'; Dimitriadis 77'
Penalties
Christodoulou (penalty scored); Georgiadis (penalty scored); Ouzounidis (penalty scored); Marangos (penalty missed); Apostolakis (penalty scored)	4–2	(penalty scored) Savevski; (penalty scored) Alexandris; (penalty missed) Tsiartas; (penalty missed) Dimitriadis

Olympic Stadium, Marousi
Attendance: 61,232
Referee: Giannis Spathas (Piraeus)

Panathinaikos	ΑΕΚ Athens

GK	1	(Poland) Józef Wandzik
RB	2	(Greece) Stratos Apostolakis (c)
CB	5	(Greece) Giannis Kalitzakis
CB	3	(Greece) Marinos Ouzounidis
LB	8	(Greece) Thanasis Kolitsidakis
DM	11	(Greece) Dimitris Markos
CM	4	(Greece) Louis Christodoulou
LM	6	(Greece) Nikos Nioplias
RM	10	(Greece) Georgios Georgiadis
AM	7	(Argentina) Juan José Borrelli	(substituted off) 67'
CF	9	(Poland) Krzysztof Warzycha	(substituted off) 65'
Substitutes:
GK		(Greece) Antonios Nikopolidis
MF	12	(Greece) Spyros Marangos	(substituted on) 67'
FW	14	(Greece) Georgios Donis	(substituted on) 65'
Manager:
(Argentina) Juan Ramón Rocha

GK	1	(Greece) Ilias Atmatsidis
RB	5	(Bosnia and Herzegovina) Refik Šabanadžović	(substituted off) 46'
CB	3	(Greece) Vaios Karagiannis
CB	4	(Greece) Stelios Manolas
LB	2	(Greece) Michalis Kasapis
DM	6	(Greece) Michalis Vlachos	(substituted off) 60'
CM	10	(Greece) Stavros Stamatis
CM	8	(North Macedonia) Toni Savevski
RW	9	(Greece) Charis Kopitsis
LW	11	(Croatia) Zoran Slišković
CF	7	(Greece) Alexis Alexandris (c)
Substitutes:
GK	15	(Greece) Vasilis Karagiannis
DF	12	(Greece) Georgios Agorogiannis
MF	13	(Greece) Tasos Mitropoulos
MF	14	(Greece) Vasilios Tsiartas	(substituted on) 46'
FW	16	(Greece) Vasilis Dimitriadis	(substituted on) 60'
Manager:
(Bosnia and Herzegovina) Dušan Bajević

Assistant referees:
Christos Sotiropoulos (Piraeus)
Nikos Chaldeos (Piraeus)

Match rules

- 90 minutes
- 30 minutes of extra time if necessary
- Penalty shootout if scores still level
- Five named substitutes
- Maximum of two substitutions

== See also ==
- 1993–94 Greek Football Cup
