= 1993 Greek Super Cup =

AEK Athens	Panathinaikos
0	1
- Date: 18 August 1993
- Venue: Olympic Stadium, Marousi, Athens
- Referee: Vassilios Nikakis (Aetoloacarnania)
- Attendance: 35,000

The 1993 Greek Super Cup was the 6th edition of the Greek Super Cup, an association football match contested by the winners of the previous season's Alpha Ethniki and Greek Cup competitions. The match took place on 18 August 1993 at the Athens Olympic Stadium. The contesting teams were the 1992–93 Alpha Ethniki champions, AEK Athens and the 1992–93 Greek Cup winners, Panathinaikos. Panathinaikos won the match 1–0.

== Venue ==
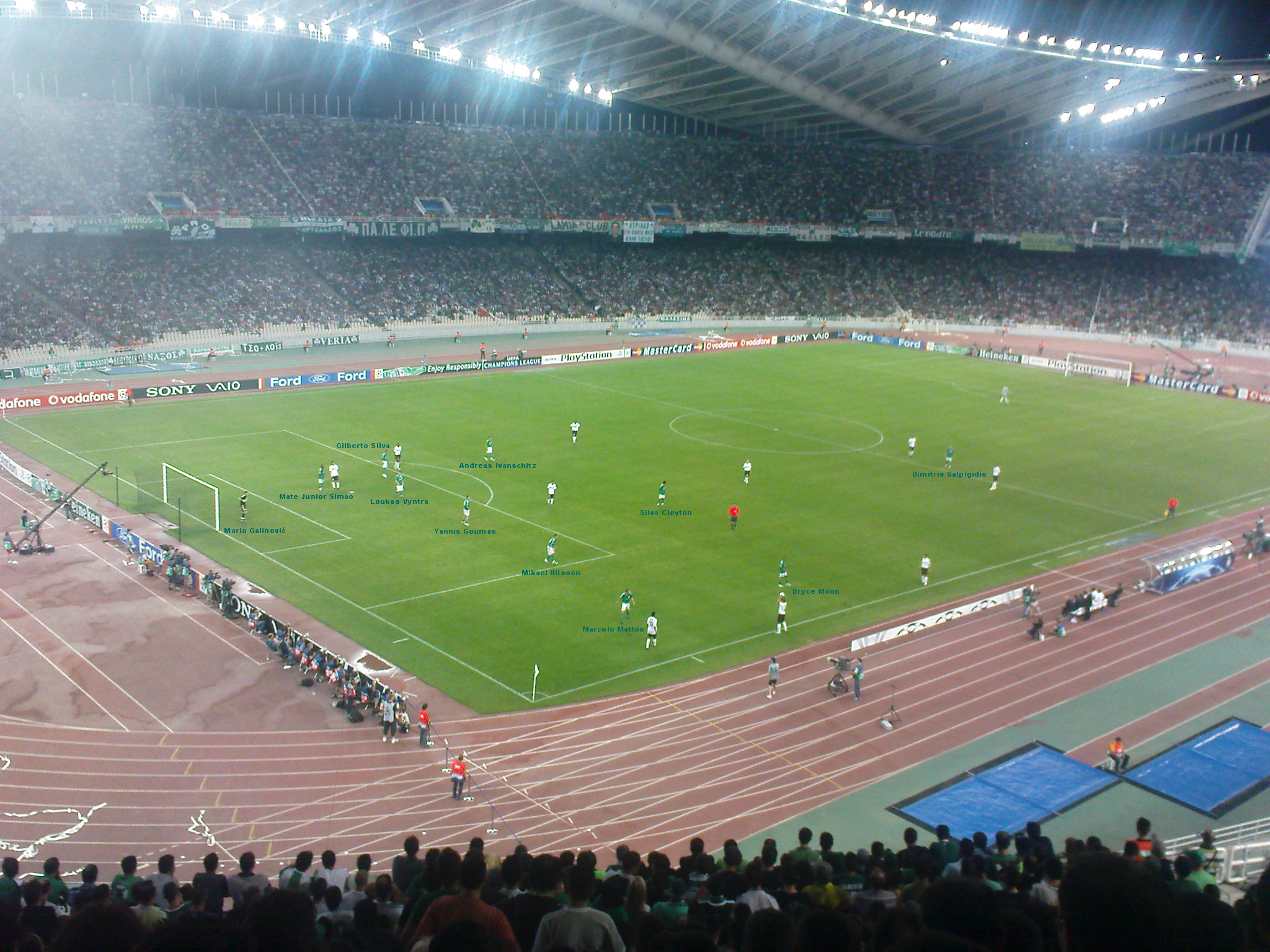
Athens Olympic Stadium.

This was the fifth Greek Super Cup held at the Athens Olympic Stadium, after 1987, 1988, 1989 and 1992.

The Athens Olympic Stadium was built in 1982. The stadium is used as a venue for Panathinaikos and Greece and was used for Olympiacos and AEK Athens in various occasions. Its current capacity is 80,000 and hosted a European Cup/UEFA Champions League final in 1983 and will host the 1994 final, a European Cup Winners' Cup final in 1987 and the 1991 Mediterranean Games.

== Background ==
AEK Athens participated in the Greek Super Cup two times, winning one of them. The last time that they had won the Super Cup was in 1989 (6–5 on penalties, which came after a 1–1 draw at the end of the extra time against Panathinaikos). The last time that they had played in the Super Cup was in 1992, where they lost to Olympiacos by 3–1.

Panathinaikos participated in the Greek Super Cup two times, winning one of them. The last time that they had won the Super Cup was in 1988 (3–1 against AEL). The last time that they had played in the Super Cup was in 1989, where they lost to AEK Athens by 6–5 on penalties, which came after a 1–1 draw at the end of the extra time.

The two teams had met each other in the Super Cup once in 1989.

== Match ==
=== Details ===
18 August 1993
21:00 EEST (UTC+3)

AEK Athens	0–1	Panathinaikos
	Report	Saravakos 22'

Olympic Stadium, Marousi
Attendance: 35,000
Referee: Vassilios Nikakis (Aetoloacarnania)

AEK Athens	Panathinaikos

GK	1	(Greece) Ilias Atmatsidis	(yellow card) 55'
CB	4	(Greece) Stelios Manolas (c)
CB	3	(Greece) Vaios Karagiannis
CB	6	(Greece) Manolis Papadopoulos
CM	5	(Bosnia and Herzegovina) Refik Šabanadžović
CM	8	(North Macedonia) Toni Savevski
RM	2	(Greece) Giorgos Agorogiannis
LM	11	(Greece) Michalis Kasapis	(yellow card) 9'
RW	7	(Greece) Alexis Alexandris		(substituted off) 68'
LW	10	(Greece) Zoran Slišković		(substituted off) 64'
CF	9	(Greece) Vasilis Dimitriadis
Substitutes:
GK	15	(Greece) Spyros Oikonomopoulos
DF	16	(Greece) Michalis Vlachos
MF	12	(Greece) Vasilios Tsiartas		(substituted on) 68'
MF	13	(Greece) Tasos Mitropoulos		(substituted on) 64'
MF	14	(Greece) Stavros Stamatis
Manager:
(Bosnia and Herzegovina) Dušan Bajević

GK	1	(Poland) Józef Wandzik
RB	2	(Greece) Stratos Apostolakis	(yellow card) 71'
CB	6	(Greece) Kostas Mavridis
CB	4	(Australia) Louis Christodoulou
LB	3	(Greece) Giorgos Kapouranis
CM	11	(Greece) Spyros Marangos
CM	8	(Greece) Kostas Antoniou
RM	7	(Greece) Dimitris Saravakos (c)
AM	5	(Argentina) Juan José Borrelli		(substituted off) 68'
LM	10	(Greece) Nikos Nioplias	(yellow card) 39'
CF	9	(Poland) Krzysztof Warzycha
Substitutes:
GK	15	(Greece) Antonios Nikopolidis
MF	12	(Greece) Stergios Giotsas
MF	13	(Greece) Georgios Georgiadis		(substituted on) 68'
MF	14	(Greece) Kostas Frantzeskos
FW	16	(Greece) Georgios Donis
Manager:
(Bosnia and Herzegovina) Ivica Osim

Match rules

- 90 minutes
- 30 minutes of extra time if necessary
- Penalty shootout if scores still level
- Five named substitutes
- Maximum of two substitutions
