= Andreas Theodoropoulos =

Greek footballer

Personal information
- Full name: Andreas Theodoropoulos
- Date of birth: 27 June 1971 (age 55)
- Place of birth: Piraeus, Greece
- Height: 1.90 m (6 ft 3 in)
- Position: Centre-back

Youth career
- AO Moschato
- –1990: Agioi Anargyroi

Senior career*
Years	Team	Apps	(Gls)
1990–1992	Aris Nikea		
1992–1993	Proodeftiki		
1993–1994	AEK Athens	0	(0)
1994	→ Proodeftiki (loan)		
1994–1997	Apollon Athens	29	(1)
1997–1999	Athinaikos	33	(1)
1999–2001	Atromitos		
2001–2002	Rodos		
2002–2003	Vyzas Megara		
2003	Ethnikos Piraeus		

Managerial career
- 2004–2006: A.O. Ilion
- 2006–2007: Olympiacos Agios Stefanos
- 2009–2010: A.O. Ilion
- 2016–2017: Vyzas Megara
- 2021–2022: APS Kythinos
- * Club domestic league appearances and goals

Andreas Theodoropoulos (Greek: Ανδρέας Θεοδωρόπουλος; born 27 June 1971) is a Greek former professional footballer who played as center back and a manager.

== Club career ==
Theodoropoulos started his football career in the mid-80s, in the academies of AO Moschato and then in the men's team, playing as a striker, while he was also a key member of the Piraeus Mixed Team. He continued to Agioi Anargyroi and established himself as the center back, while also competing in the Athens Mixed Team. In 1990 he moved to Nikaia for the local, Aris Nikaia, playing in the third division. In 1992, he was transferred to Proodeftiki, where he played in the second division and was named the best defender of the league that season.

On 29 June 1993, he took the big step in his career and was transferred to AEK Athens. Under Dušan Bajević, where in his first season he won the Championship. He did not his manager's trust and did not compete at all in the league managing to appear only once in the Cup. On 16 December 1994 he was transferred to Apollon Athens. He played the two and a half seasons at the club, contributing significantly to the output of the team for the only time in its history in Europe and its participation in the UEFA Cup, as a key member of the defense and also in the lost, by the previous team of AEK, Greek Cup final in 1996 by 7–1.

In 1997, he was transferred to Athinaikos, where he was voted for in best eleven of the league in 1998 and 1999. That was the last time of his career that competed in the first division. In 1999 he was transferred to Atromitos and two years later, he transferred to Rodos for a season and then in Vyzas Megara. In January 2003 he moved to Ethnikos Piraeus, where he played until the end of the season, ending his football career.

== Managerial career ==
With his retirement as a football player, Theodoropoulos started working as a manager. In 2004 he assumed the technical leadership of A.O. Ilion, where he worked for two consecutive seasons, until 2006. Then he took over Olympiacos Agios Stefanos, for one season. In 2008 he returned to Proodeftiki, taking over the scouting of the team in third division. In 2009, he again assumed the technical leadership of A.O. Ilion, in which he worked in the for a season, managing to raise it from the first local division. In 2014 he moved to Kalamata, as assistant to Michalis Kavalieris, until the end of the season in 2015 in the third division. In December 2016, he assumed the technical leadership of Vyzas, where he worked until the end of March 2017. He then collaborated with the Nestoras FC Academy as a manager in the field of personal trainer. In 2019, he assumed the Technical Director of the youth departments of Acharnaikos, for two years. The following season, he took over APS Kythinos, which competed in the Cyclades first local division as well as the supervision of the infrastructure departments of the club.

== Honours ==
AEK Athens

- Alpha Ethniki: 1993–94
