= Pantelis Konstantinidis =

Greek footballer (born 1975)

Personal information
- Full name: Panteleimon Konstantinidis
- Date of birth: 16 August 1975 (age 51)
- Place of birth: Florina, Macedonia, Greece
- Height: 1.72 m (5 ft 8 in)
- Positions: Left winger; left back

Team information
- Current team: PAOK (Assistant Coach)

Youth career
- –1993: PAS Florina

Senior career*
Years	Team	Apps	(Gls)
1993–1996	AEK Athens	0	(0)
1994–1996	→ Kavala (loan)	51	(9)
1996–1998	Apollon Athens	58	(2)
1998–2002	PAOK	101	(17)
2002–2005	Panathinaikos	65	(5)
2005–2009	PAOK	92	(7)
2009–2010	OFI	25	(2)
Total		392	(42)

International career
1996–1998	Greece U21	8	(0)
1999–2003	Greece	20	(0)

Managerial career
- 2010: PAOK (Interim)
- 2010–2015: PAOK (Technical Director)
- 2015–2016: Al-Ittihad (Assistant)
- 2016–2019: PAOK (Team Manager)
- 2019–2021: Al-Hilal (Assistant)
- 2021–: PAOK (Assistant)
- * Club domestic league appearances and goals

Pantelis Konstantinidis (Greek: Παντελής Κωνσταντινίδης; born 16 August 1975) is a Greek former footballer who played as a left winger, could also play as a left back. His quick dribbling in his youth earned the nickname "Svouras" (spinning top). During 2010 Konstantinidis assumed the position of technical director at PAOK,and 2019-2021 Assistant Coach at Al-Hilal and 2021-present PAOK succeeding Zisis Vryzas.

== Club career ==
Konstantinidis began playing football at PAS Florina. On 8 July 1993 he was signed by the Greek champions, AEK Athens for a fee of 9 million drachmas. Despite being in the team's roster, when they won their third consecutive championship, but he did not manage to make a single appearance. On 4 July 1994 Konstantinidis was loaned to Kavala where he stayed for two seasons. Upon his return on 20 June 1996 to was given as an exchange to Apollon Athens as part of the transfer of Demis Nikolaidis to AEK.

At Apollon he spent a succefull two-season spell and became an international with Greece U21.

Konstantinidis signed with PAOK in 1998 and stayed there for four years. He topped his game and made himself steady in the starting eleven as a left winger, where he became a fan favourite. In the summer of 2002, due to the club's financial problems he was sold to Panathinaikos, where he played for three years, making over 60 appearances. In 2005 he returned to PAOK in 2005. During his second spell at the club of Thessaloniki, he became one of their captains. In the summer of 2009, Konstantinidis fell out of favor the plans of Fernando Santos and thus he moved to OFI in the Beta Ethniki. After the season's end, in which OFI narrowly failed to achieve promotion to the first division, Konstantinidis decided to retire, at the age of 35.

== Honours ==
AEK Athens

- Alpha Ethniki: 1993–94

PAOK

- Greek Cup: 2000–01

Panathinaikos

- Alpha Ethniki: 2003–04
- Greek Cup: 2003–04

Greece U21

- UEFA European Under-21 Championship runner-up: 1998

=== Individual ===
- PAOK MVP of the Season: 2000–01
