= Giorgos Kapouranis =

Greek footballer (born 1966)

Personal information
- Full name: Georgios Kapouranis
- Date of birth: 20 May 1966 (age 60)
- Place of birth: Olpe, West Germany
- Height: 1.84 m (6 ft 0 in)
- Position: Defender

Youth career
- –1985: Olympiacos

Senior career*
Years	Team	Apps	(Gls)
1985–1988	Olympiacos	33	(3)
1988–1991	Panionios	68	(6)
1991–1992	Athinaikos	41	(3)
1992–1997	Panathinaikos	124	(8)
1998–1999	Panachaiki	44	(4)
1999–2000	Thesprotos	21	(1)

International career
1986–1988	Greece U21	6	(1)
1991–1993	Greece	4	(0)
- * Club domestic league appearances and goals

Giorgos Kapouranis (Greek: Γιώργος Καπουράνης, born 21 February 1970) is a former professional footballer who played as a defender. Born in West Germany, he represented the Greece national team.

Kapouranis is perhaps best remembered for his winning goal in a 1995 derby of the eternal enemies between Panathinaikos and his old club Olympiacos. He was subsequently part of the Panathinaikos team that famously reached the semi-finals of the 1995–96 UEFA Champions League, beating AFC Ajax away in the first leg but losing at home.

He represented Greece U21 in the 1988 UEFA European Under-21 Championship, and was eventually capped four times for Greece.

== Honours ==
Olympiacos

- Alpha Ethniki: 1986–87
- Greek Super Cup: 1987

Panathinaikos

- Alpha Ethniki: 1994–95, 1995–96
- Greek Cup: 1992–93, 1993–94, 1994–95
- Greek Super Cup: 1993
