= Nikos Nioplias =

Greek footballer and manager

Personal information
- Full name: Nikolaos Nioplias
- Date of birth: 17 January 1965 (age 61)
- Place of birth: Galatini, Kozani, Greece
- Height: 1.73 m (5 ft 8 in)
- Position: Midfielder

Team information
- Current team: Chania (manager)

Youth career
- 1981–1982: Neoi Galatinis

Senior career*
| Years | Team | Apps | (Gls) |
| 1982–1993 | OFI | 257 | (31) |
| 1993–1996 | Panathinaikos | 73 | (4) |
| 1996–2002 | OFI | 159 | (30) |
| 2002–2004 | Chalkidona | 44 | (4) |
| Total | | 533 | (69) |

International career
| 1988–1995 | Greece | 44 | (1) |

Managerial career
- 2005–2007: Greece U19
- 2007–2009: Greece U21
- 2009–2010: Panathinaikos
- 2011–2013: Cyprus
- 2015: Atromitos
- 2016–2017: OFI
- 2021–2022: OFI
- 2023: Levadiakos
- 2026–: Chania
- * Club domestic league appearances and goals

Nikos Nioplias (Greek: Νίκος Νιόπλιας; born 17 January 1965) is a Greek professional football manager and former player. He currently manages Gamma Ethniki club Chania.

== Playing career ==
=== Club ===
His career began with OFI in 1983, winning the Greek Cup in 1987, and he remained for a decade before moving to Panathinaikos. In his first season, he won the cup again and in 1994–95 they completed the domestic double. The next season the Athens side retained the title and Nioplias was a member of the team which reached the UEFA Champions League semi-finals in 1995.

In 1996, he returned to OFI and remained for six seasons until 2002, when he moved to Chalkidona FC. He played for the newly promoted side until summer 2004 when he ended his career, having racked up 509 Greek top-flight appearances.

=== International ===
He played for Greece under-18 at the 1984 UEFA European under-18 championship. In 1988, as a member of Greece under-21, he helped his team reach the final of the 1988 UEFA European Under-21 Football Championship. He was promoted to the senior team the same year, and was a member of the squad which qualified to the 1994 FIFA World Cup. He appeared in all three games Greece played at the World Cup, losing every one of them.

In total, he made 44 appearances and scored 1 goal for Greece.

== Managerial career ==
=== Greece under-19 ===
After getting his coaching diploma, in January 2005 he was appointed as the coach of the Greece national under-19 football team. He led the team to the 2005 U19 European Championship which took place in Northern Ireland, but failed to progress past the group stage, despite a victory against the hosts. This was due to two straight 3–0 defeats in the remaining games of the group, with Nioplias blaming the poor fitness of his players.

Two years later, he led Greece to the final of the U19 European Championship after remaining unbeaten in their group, which featured Spain, Portugal and the host nation Austria. Greece than beat Germany 3–2 in the semi-final with a 90th-minute header after Greece had a player sent off in the 61st minute. The final between Spain (who beat France in the other semi-final) and Greece was played on 27 July and Greece lost 1–0, despite a convincing second half display.

=== Greece under-21 ===
Nioplias was named coach of the Greece national under-21 football team in September 2007 after his success with Greece under-19 in Austria.

=== Panathinaikos ===
Nioplias was appointed as the Panathinaikos head coach, alongside Krzysztof Warzycha on 8 December 2009, immediately after the former manager, Henk ten Cate, was released. Nioplias stated: "It is a great honour for me to be the manager of Panathinaikos. Starting from today, we are getting to work. My aim is to achieve as a coach what I have achieved as a player: to win titles". He managed to do the double in 2010, winning both the Greek Super League and the Greek Cup.

He left Panathinaikos on 15 November 2010 by mutual consent due to a disappointing run of results domestically and abroad.

=== Cyprus ===
In June 2011, Nioplias agreed with the Cyprus Football Association to be the manager of the Cyprus national football team until the end of the UEFA Euro 2012 qualifiers and for the 2014 World Cup qualifiers. He made his official debut in a EURO 2012 qualifier against Portugal, where his team suffered a 0–4 defeat at home. After Cyprus' 0–2 loss to Slovenia on 12 September 2013, Nioplias resigned in the wake of Cyprus's poor showing in the 2014 World Cup qualifiers.

=== OFI ===
In January 2016, Nioplias replaced Nikos Goulis and had achieved the promotion of the club from 2015–16 Gamma Ethniki to Football League (now Super League 2). He was replaced exactly a year later by Nikos Papadopoulos.

In March 2021, after Georgios Simos's sacking, Nioplias returned to OFI and has since then resulted in a negative win/loss ratio. Nioplias was sacked in October 2022, after losing 1–0 to Super League 2 club A.E. Kifisia during the fifth round of the 2022–23 Cup.

== Managerial statistics ==
As of 10 December 2023

| Team | From | To | Record | | | | |
| Team | From | To | G | W | D | L | Win % |
|---|---|---|---|---|---|---|---|
| Greece U19 | 2005 | 2007 | 21 | 11 | 4 | 6 | 52.38 |
| Greece U21 | 2007 | 2009 | 19 | 9 | 5 | 5 | 47.37 |
| Panathinaikos | 2009 | 2010 | 42 | 26 | 8 | 8 | 61.90 |
| Cyprus | 2011 | 2013 | 18 | 2 | 2 | 14 | 11.11 |
| Atromitos | 2015 | 2015 | 18 | 9 | 4 | 5 | 50.00 |
| OFI | 2016 | 2017 | 17 | 9 | 4 | 4 | 52.94 |
| OFI | 2021 | 2022 | 53 | 16 | 17 | 20 | 30.19 |
| Levadiakos | 2023 | 2023 | 14 | 11 | 2 | 1 | 78.57 |
| Total | | | 202 | 93 | 46 | 63 | 46.04 |

== Honours ==
=== Player ===
OFI

- Greek Cup: 1986–87
- Balkans Cup: 1989

Panathinaikos

- Alpha Ethniki: 1994–95, 1995–96
- Greek Cup: 1992–93, 1993–94, 1994–95
- Greek Super Cup: 1993, 1994

=== Manager ===
Greece U19

- U19 European Championship: 2007 (runners-up)

Panathinaikos

- Super League Greece: 2009–10
- Greek Cup: 2009–10

OFI

- Gamma Ethniki: 2015–16 (Group 4)
