= Dimitris Markos =

Greek footballer and scout

Personal information
- Full name: Dimitrios Markos
- Date of birth: 31 January 1971 (age 55)
- Place of birth: Kilkis, Greece
- Height: 1.81 m (5 ft 11 in)
- Position: Midfielder

Team information
- Current team: OFI (Scout)

Senior career*
Years	Team	Apps	(Gls)
1987–1992	Naoussa	129	(15)
1992–1997	Panathinaikos	99	(13)
1997–1998	Sheffield United	0	(0)
1998	Kalamata	16	(1)
1998–2000	AEK Athens	49	(3)
2000–2002	Aris	36	(2)
2002–2005	PAOK	39	(2)
Total		368	(36)

International career
1992–1999	Greece	17	(1)
- * Club domestic league appearances and goals

Dimitris Markos (Greek: Δημήτρης Μάρκος; born 31 January 1971) is a Greek former professional footballer who played as a midfielder. He now works as a scout for OFI.

== Club career ==
Markos started his football career in 1987 at Naoussa, where he played for five seasons before joining Panathinaikos in 1992. He gradually established himself as a first-team player for five years, won 3 Championships, 3 Cups and 2 Super Cups, including a double in 1995 and at the same time he became an international. He a member of the team that reached the semi-finals of the UEFA Champions League in 1996, scoring in the decisive away win against Porto.

In the summer of 1997 Markos moved to England for Sheffield United, where he failed to compete in any game and after a few months he returned to Greece to play for the second division side, Kalamata. The officials of AEK Athens noticing that he was by no means a second-division player, decided to sign him in the summer of 1998. He was a regular in the midfield of the team and with his presence helped the club a lot for two seasons. On 10 May 2000 he won the cup, even though staying on the bench throughout the final against Ionikos.

On 27 June 2000 Markos was released from AEK and signed for Aris, where he played for 2 seasons. In 2002 he moved to their rivals, PAOK where he played for 3 seasons before retiring, winning yet another cup on 17 May 2003, playing the full match against his former club.

== International career ==
Markos was first called to play with Greece in 1992 and made 17 appearances scoring 1 goal until 1999.

== After football ==
In 2005 he returned to AEK for a few years as a team scout. In 2013 was also a scout at the Panathinaikos academies. Since 2018, he works as a scout for OFI.

== Honours ==
Panathinaikos

- Alpha Ethniki: 1994–95, 1995–96
- Greek Cup: 1992–93, 1993–94, 1994–95
- Greek Super Cup: 1993, 1994

AEK Athens

- Greek Cup: 1999–2000

PAOK

- Greek Cup: 2002–03
