= Louis Christodoulou =

Australian soccer player

Personal information
- Full name: Leonidas Christodoulou
- Date of birth: 7 August 1967 (age 59)
- Place of birth: Adelaide, Australia
- Position: Midfielder

Senior career*
Years	Team	Apps	(Gls)
	West Adelaide	21+	(4+)
1987–1997	Panathinaikos	177	(21)
1998	West Adelaide	5	(0)

International career
1985–1987	Australia U20	6	(0)
- * Club domestic league appearances and goals

Leonidas Christodoulou (Greek: Λούης Χριστοδούλου; born 7 August 1967) is an Australian former soccer player who is last known to have played as a midfielder for West Adelaide.

== Career ==
In 1987, Christodoulou signed for Panathinaikos, one of Greece's most successful clubs.

Before the second half of 1997/98, he signed for West Adelaide in Australia.

== Honours ==
Panathinaikos

- 4 Alpha Ethniki:

1989–90, 1990–91, 1994–95, 1995–96

- 6 Greek Cup:

1987–88, 1988–89, 1990–91, 1992–93, 1993–94, 1994–95

- 3 Greek Super Cup:

1988, 1993, 1994
