= Christos Karkamanis =

Greek footballer

Personal information
- Date of birth: 22 September 1969 (age 57)
- Place of birth: Thessaloniki, Greece
- Position: Goalkeeper

Senior career*
Years	Team	Apps	(Gls)
1987–1997	Aris	234	(0)
1997–1999	Iraklis	49	(0)
1999–2000	Edessaikos	0	(0)
2000–2002	Trikala	29	(0)
2002–2003	Kozani	0	(0)
2003–2004	Poseidon Neon Poron	13	(0)
2004–2006	Olympiacos Volos	21	(0)
Total		346	(0)

International career
1992–1995	Greece	10	(0)
- * Club domestic league appearances and goals

Christos Karkamanis (Greek: Χρήστος Καρκαμάνης, born 22 September 1969) is a Greek football coach and former player who played as a goalkeeper.

== Career ==
Karkamanis played for Aris and Iraklis, as well as for the national side.

In July 2007, Karkamanis was signed as the goalkeeping coach for Ethnikos Katerini.
