= Tasos Mitropoulos =

Greek footballer and politician

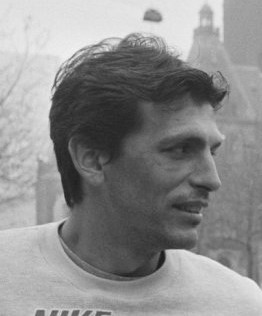
- Mitropoulos in 1987

Personal information
- Full name: Anastasios Mitropoulos
- Date of birth: 23 August 1957 (age 69)
- Place of birth: Volos, Greece
- Height: 1.90 m (6 ft 3 in)
- Positions: Attacking midfielder; striker

Youth career
- 1976: Aris Petroupolis

Senior career*
Years	Team	Apps	(Gls)
1976–1981	Ethnikos Piraeus	112	(25)
1981–1992	Olympiacos	270	(55)
1992–1994	AEK Athens	56	(6)
1994	Panathinaikos	2	(0)
1994–1995	Apollon Athens	13	(1)
1995	Iraklis	8	(1)
1996–1997	Veria	48	(14)
1997	Olympiacos	0	(0)
Total		510	(102)

International career
1978–1994	Greece	77	(8)
- * Club domestic league appearances and goals

Tasos Mitropoulos (Greek: Τάσος Μητρόπουλος; born 23 August 1957) is a Greek politician and former international footballer who played as a attacking midfielder. He was given the nickname "Rambo" by the fans of Olympiacos.

== Club career ==
Mitropoulos started his football career at his local club, Aris Petroupolis. In 1976, he joined Ethnikos Piraeus, where he played five seasons and his performances attracted the major Greek clubs.

In 1981, Mitropoulos moved to Olympiacos. He was used both as a striker and an attacking midfielder. Mitropoulos was distinguished for his strength, aggression, passion and his aerial ability, while he was also a technichal player. There he played for 11 seasons, becoming one of the team's main players and won three Championships, two Cups and a Super Cup.

On 16 July 1992 Mitropoulos left Olympiacos and signed for their rivals, AEK Athens. There he was established in the squad, with the manager, Dušan Bajević, using him mainly as a super-sub, due to his advance age. He spent two seasons at the yellow-blacks, winning as many league titles.

On 22 July 1994, after his contract at AEK had expired he joined Panathinaikos, albeit only one match. He also played for Apollon Athens, Iraklis and before returning to Olympiacos in 1997 to finish his career at the age of 40.

== International career ==
Mitropoulos was also a prominent member of Greece between 1978 and 1994, playing 76 matches and scoring 8 goals. He played at the 1994 FIFA World Cup in the United States.

== Managerial career ==
After retiring from playing in 1998, Mitropoulos became an assistant manager to Dušan Bajević, Alberto Bigon, Ioannis Matzourakis and Takis Lemonis in Olympiacos. During his tenure the club won four consecutive Greek Championships from 1999 to 2002.

== Personal life ==
After retiring, Mitropoulos became a politician serving in the Piraeus city council. He ran for Parliament in 2004 for the New Democracy party.

== Honours ==
Olympiacos

- Alpha Ethniki: 1981–82, 1982–83, 1986–87, 1997–98
- Greek Cup: 1989–90, 1991–92
- Greek Super Cup: 1987

AEK Athens

- Alpha Ethniki: 1992–93, 1993–94

Panathinaikos

- Alpha Ethniki: 1994–95
- Greek Cup: 1994–95
- Greek Super Cup: 1994
