= Manolis Papadopoulos =

Greek footballer (1968–2025)

Personal information
- Full name: Emmanouil Papadopoulos
- Date of birth: 22 April 1968
- Place of birth: Livadia, Greece
- Date of death: 16 May 2025 (aged 57)
- Place of death: Livadia, Greece
- Height: 1.89 m (6 ft 2 in)
- Position: Defender

Senior career*
Years	Team	Apps	(Gls)
1986–1989	Olympiacos	4	(0)
1989–1992	→ Ionikos (loan)	61	(0)
1992–1995	AEK Athens	56	(0)
1995–1997	Apollon Athens	30	(0)
1997–1999	Ethnikos Piraeus	47	(0)
1999	PAS Giannina		
1999–2001	Kozani		
2001–2002	Chaidari		
Total		198	(0)

International career
1992	Greece	1	(0)

Managerial career
- 2005: Kerkyra (interim)
- 2005: Pamisos Messini
- 2005–2007: AE Giannena
- 2007–2008: Lamia
- 2011–2012: AEK Athens U20
- 2012–2013: AEK Athens (assistant)
- 2012: AEK Athens (interim)
- 2013: Proodeftiki
- 2014: Egaleo
- 2015–2016: APO Kanaris Nenita
- * Club domestic league appearances and goals

Manolis Papadopoulos (Greek: Μανώλης Παπαδόπουλος; 22 April 1968 – 16 May 2025) was a Greek professional football player who played as a defender and manager.

== Club career ==
Papadopoulos started his career in 1986 at Olympiacos. In the summer of 1989 he was loaned to Ionikos, where he was established as a regular.

On 14 July 1992 Papadopoulos was transferred to the Greek champions, AEK Athens, in the summer of 1992. He was used mainly as a substitute, but sometimes he made it to the starting line-up, especially when Dušan Bajević used a formation with three center-backs. In the matches against Rangers for the UEFA Champions League qualifiers in the summer of 1994, he was assigned to mark Mark Hateley and eventually he managed in contain him effectively. AEK eliminated the Scottish club and became the first Greek club to qualify in the tournament under the new format. During his spell with the "double-headed eagle", Papadopoulos won two consecutive Championships in 1993 and 1994.

On 13 July 1995 he signed for Apollon Athens, where he played for two seasons. Afterwards he moved to Ethnikos Piraeus for two years. In 1999 he signed for PAS Giannina for a while and then moved to Kozani. In 2001 he signed for Chaidari, where he retired at the end of the season.

== International career ==
Papadopoulos played once for Greece on 29 January 1992 in an away friendly match against Albania, coming in as a sub at the half time. He won the gold medal at the 1991 Mediterranean Games.

== Managerial career ==
Papadopoulos started his coaching career in 2002, during which he sat on the benches of various teams, such as Kerkyra, Pamisos Messini, AE Giannena and Lamia. In the summer of 2011, he was hired as the coach of the youth team of AEK Athens, while at the beginning of the following season he assumed the role of assistant to the manager of the senior team, Vangelis Vlachos. The club were going through the worst season in their history after Vlachos was sacked he became the manager for a match at home against Kerkyra, which ended 1–1. Afterwards, Ewald Lienen was hired and Papadopoulos continued his duties as an assistant of the German manager until the end of the season. After AEK, he sat on the bench of Proodeftiki for a few days and then at Egaleo, while in 2015 he was at APO Kanaris Nenita for a season.

== Personal life and death ==
Papadopoulos had a strong participation in the association of veteran football players of AEK.

He died on 16 May 2025, at the age of 57.

== Honours ==
AEK Athens

- Alpha Ethniki: 1992–93, 1993–94
