= Zoran Slišković =

Croatian footballer (born 1966)

Personal information
- Full name: Zoran Slišković
- Date of birth: 1 March 1966 (age 60)
- Place of birth: Trpanj, SFR Yugoslavia
- Height: 1.85 m (6 ft 1 in)
- Position: Forward

Youth career
- Faraon Trpanj
- 1982–1984: Grk Potomje
- 1984: Neretvanac Opuzen

Senior career*
Years	Team	Apps	(Gls)
1984–1985	Neretvanac Opuzen		
1986–1991	Željezničar	93	(20)
1991–1992	HAŠK Građanski	16	(6)
1992–1994	AEK Athens	75	(40)
1994–1995	Paniliakos		
1995–1997	Croatia Zagreb	38	(4)
1997–1999	Slaven Belupo	45	(9)
Total		244	(55)
- * Club domestic league appearances and goals

Zoran Slišković (born 1 March 1966) is a former Croatian football player, who played as a forward.

== Club career ==
Slišković trained on his own, without proper coaching, at the local Faraon Trpanj, before moving on as a teenager to play for a couple of seasons to the nearby Grk Potomje. He claims to have been coached properly only when he came, aged 18, to Neretvanac Opuzen, quickly ascending to the first team. The following season, Slišković joined FK Željezničar Sarajevo in the Yugoslav First League, with coach Ivica Osim giving him green light after a trial.

On 14 July 1992 Slišković moved to Greece and was transferred to first division side AEK Athens for a fee of 60 million drachmas. He played for two seasons at the club, winning as many Championships, while he emerged as the top scorer of the Greek Cup in 1994 with 10 goals. On 31 October 1992 he scored a brace helping his team won in the away match against Skoda Xanthi with 3–4. On 6 June 1993 he opened the score at the first minute, in the 3–1 win against Olympiacos. On 22 December 1993 he scored the decider in the 1–2 away victory over OFI. He scored the winner against Iraklis away from home, on 13 March 1994. On 3 April 1994, he also scored the winner in the away match against Edessaikos. In the summer of 1994, the people of AEK, in their effort to strengthen the team for the qualifying games of the UEFA Champions League group stage, terminated his contract, in order to free up a foreigner position.

On 17 June 1994 Slišković signed with for Paniliakos in the second division, where he played for one season. Afterwards, he returned to Croatia to play for two season for Croatia Zagreb, before retiring in 1999 at Slaven Belupo.

== Honours ==
AEK Athens

- Alpha Ethniki: 1992–93, 1993–94

Paniliakos

- Beta Ethniki: 1994–95

Individual

- Greek Cup Top scorer: 1993–94
