= Vassilios Nikakis =

Greek football referee (born 1953)

- Full name: Vassilios Nikakis
- Born: 28 September 1953 (age 73); Agrinio, Greece

Domestic
Years	League	Role
1996	Greek First League	Referee

International
Years	League	Role
1989–1996	FIFA–listed	Referee

Vassilios Nikakis (Greek: Βασίλης Νικάκης; born 28 September 1953) is a Greek former football referee. He officiated at the 1991 FIFA Women's World Cup, and was on call as a reserve official for the 1994 FIFA World Cup.

Nikakis later served as a FIFA referee inspector. In 2012, he stood as an election candidate for the Communist Party of Greece.

He is a candidate for the European Parliament with KKE, in the elections of 25 May 2014.
