= Vasilis Karagiannis =

Greek footballer (born 1969)

Personal information
- Full name: Vasilios Karagiannis
- Date of birth: 27 September 1969 (age 57)
- Place of birth: Rhodes, Greece
- Height: 1.80 m (5 ft 11 in)
- Position: Goalkeeper

Youth career
- –1988: AO Lindos Rodos

Senior career*
Years	Team	Apps	(Gls)
1988–1993	Diagoras	7^{[a]}	(0^{[a]})
1992–1993	→ Pontioi Veria (loan)		
1993–1999	AEK Athens	16	(0)
1999	Ethnikos Piraeus	1	(0)
2000	Diagoras		
2005	Kleovoulos Lindos		
Total		24	(0)

Managerial career
- 2013: Kleovoulos Lindos
- * Club domestic league appearances and goals

Vasilis Karagiannis (Greek: Βασίλης Καραγιάννης; born 27 September 1969) is a Greek former professional footballer who played as a goalkeeper and later a manager.

== Club career ==
Karagiannis began his football career with his local club AO Lindos Rodos. In 1988, he moved to the first division club, Diagoras. In 1992, he agreed to join AEK Athens the following summer and was subsequently loaned to Pontioi Veria for the rest of the season.

In the summer of 1993, his transfer to AEK was eventually completed for a fee of 20 million drachmas. There, he served primarily as a second-choice goalkeeper behind Ilias Atmatsidis. On 28 October 1995, he conceded a long-range free-kick goal from Chris Kalantzis in AEK's 1–1 home league draw against Olympiacos. In the summer of 1997, Karagiannis was involved in an incident during AEK's first training session of the season, when supporters attacked him alongside the club's president, Alexis Kougias, following earlier comments he had made concerning teammate Toni Savevski and former manager Petros Ravousis. In March 1999, he was left out of the squad after filing a claim against the club, alongside Georgios Donis over unpaid wages. In April, efforts by AEK and Karagiannis to reach a settlement in order to withdraw his claim did not change the player's status within the team. During his spell at the club, he won a Championship, two Cups and a Greek Super Cup.

In the summer of 1999, Karagiannis left AEK and on 30 July he signed for the second division club, Ethnikos Piraeus. There he managed to make a league and a Cup appearance, before being released in October. In 2000 he returned to Diagoras playing in the local divisions of Rhodes. He continued his career at an amateur level, playing for Kleovoulos Lindos in 2005 before retiring as a footballer.

== Managerial career ==
Karagiannis became involved in coaching, although he did not manage a club in a professional division. In 2013, he was the manager of Kleovoulos Lindos.

== Honours ==
AEK Athens

- Alpha Ethniki: 1993–94
- Greek Cup: 1995–96, 1996–97
- Greek Super Cup: 1996

== Notes ==
a. Only first division stats.
