= Michalis Vlachos =

Greek footballer (born 1967)

Personal information
- Full name: Michail Vlachos
- Date of birth: 20 September 1967 (age 59)
- Place of birth: Athens, Greece
- Height: 1.83 m (6 ft 0 in)
- Positions: Defender; defensive midfielder

Senior career*
Years	Team	Apps	(Gls)
1985–1991	Apollon Athens	122	(11)
1991–1993	Olympiacos	47	(2)
1993–1998	AEK Athens	101	(4)
1998–2000	Portsmouth	56	(1)
2000	Walsall	12	(1)
2000–2002	Ionikos	36	(1)
2002–2003	Apollon Athens	21	(1)
Total		395	(21)

International career
1989–1997	Greece	10	(0)

Managerial career
- 2007–2008: Apollon Eretrias
- 2008–: Peramaikos
- * Club domestic league appearances and goals

Michalis Vlachos (Greek: Μιχάλης Βλάχος; born 20 September 1967) is a Greek football manager and a former professional footballer who played as a defender.

== Career ==
Vlachos began his career with Apollon Smyrnis, where he was called up for a debut with Greece in 1989. He competed as a centre-back, but he could just easily play as a defensive midfielder.

In 1991 he moved to Olympiacos, where he played for two seasons, winning a Greek Cup and a Greek Super Cup in 1992.

In the summer of 1993 he signed for AEK Athens. In his first season at the yellow-blacks he won the Championship. In the following season, Vlachos had the opportunity to participate in the first ever group stag of the UEFA Champions League, scoring in a 1–3 defeat to Casino Salzburg. He established himself in the squad and after few seasons he also became one of the team's captains. On 29 January 1998 he was released from AEK Athens.

Afterwards, Vlachos joined English First Division club Portsmouth, for whom he made over 50 league appearances as a midfielder and sweeper in two years. He joined Walsall in February 2000, making 12 appearances for the club prior to relegation in May of the same year.

Vlachos returned to Greece in the summer of 2000, joining Ionikos. He finished his career with his first club Apollon, retiring in 2003.

== Honours ==
Olympiacos

- Greek Cup: 1991–92
- Greek Super Cup: 1992

AEK Athens

- Alpha Ethniki: 1993–94
- Greek Cup: 1995–96, 1996–97
- Greek Super Cup: 1996
