= Georgios Agorogiannis =

Greek footballer

Personal information
- Date of birth: 3 May 1966 (age 60)
- Place of birth: Larissa, Greece
- Height: 1.80 m (5 ft 11 in)
- Positions: Right-back; right midfielder

Youth career
- 1982–1984: Toxotis Larissa

Senior career*
Years	Team	Apps	(Gls)
1984–1992	AEL	156	(23)
1992–1995	AEK Athens	64	(4)
1995–1996	Panionios	16	(1)
1996–1998	AEL	19	(1)
Total		255	(29)

International career
1984–1985	Greece U19	4	(1)
1987	Greece Olympic	2	(0)
1989–1992	Greece	7	(0)
- * Club domestic league appearances and goals

Georgios Agorogiannis (Greek: Γεώργιος Aγορογιάννης; born 3 May 1966) is a Greek former international football player who played as a right-back.

== Club career ==
Agorogiannis started his football career at team of his hometown, Toxotis Larissa in 1982. Two years later his good performances earned him a transfer to the major club of the region, AEL. He established himself quickly in the club and was a key player in winning the Cup in 1985 and the championship in 1988, which consisted the first major titles of the club.

On 1 July 1992 Agorogiannis was transferred to the champions, AEK Athens for a fee of 35 million drachmas. He helped the "yellow-blacks" win another 2 back-to-back league titles, while also participating in 2 Cup finals, losing both to Panathinaikos. In 1994, he also managed to compete in the first ever group stage of the UEFA Champions League

On 14 December 1995 he moved to Panionios. At the end of the season they finished at the 17th place and were relegated. He stayed at the club of Nea Smyrni in the second division, but in the midst of the season he returned to AEL. He played for the club of Larissa for one and a half year, before retiring in 1998.

== International career ==
Agorogiannis was a member of the Greece U19 that qualified for the final stage of the European Championship in 1984, as well as the 1985 qualifying stage.

In 1987 he participated in two matches with the Olympic team, on 28 October in a friendly 0–2 loss at home against Italy and on 2 December against Poland, where they lost by 1–0 at home, for the Olympic Games of the 1988 in Seoul.

Agorogiannis played 7 games with Greece from 1989 to 1992. His debut took place on 5 September 1989 in an away friendly loss against Poland. He also played on 20 September 1989 in the loss against Yugoslavia away from home and on 11 October of the same year in the away defeat against Bulgaria. On 5 September 1990 he played in the win against Albania at home and on 10 October 1990 in the home win over Egypt. He also competed on 12 February 1992 in the victory against Romania at home and on 25 March in the away win against Cyprus, which was his last international appearance.

== Honours ==
AEL

- Alpha Ethniki: 1987–88
- Greek Cup: 1984–85

AEK Athens

- Alpha Ethniki: 1992–93, 1993–94
