= 1993–94 Greek Football Cup =

1993–94 Greek Cup
Tournament details
- Country: Greece
- Teams: 72

Final positions
- Champions: Panathinaikos (14th title)
- Runners-up: AEK Athens

Tournament statistics
- Matches played: 117
- Top goal scorer(s): Zoran Slišković (10 goals)

The 1993–94 Greek Football Cup was the 52nd edition of the Greek Football Cup.

== Tournament details ==
Totally 72 teams participated, 18 from Alpha Ethniki, 18 from Beta, and 36 from Gamma. It was held in 6 rounds, included final.

It was a very interesting competition with undecided matches and led in a final between Panathinaikos and AEK Athens, a pair that had not appeared in a Greek Cup final for 45 years, since the last confrontation between the two teams in the final match was in 1949. AEK Athens qualified in the final after 11 years, while Panathinaikos had eliminated PAOK earlier in penalty shoot-out, after two goalless draws.

The final match was the one of two more shocking finals in history of Greek Cup, after 1976. Panathinaikos preceded 2–0 and appeared to win, however, in a few minutes to its end, AEK Athens managed to tie the game, to take the lead in the start of extra time only to be drawn and eventually to lose the title in the penalty shoot-out. At the same time, they lost the chance to win the double, since the same year they won the championship.

Remarkable in the competition was also the bombardment of goals, almost in all phases and mainly in second legs. Characteristically, in second matches of second round, 16 in the number, were marked 64 goals, mean 4 goals per match, and in corresponding of third round 30 goals in 8 matches.

Also, it is remarkable that in unique two from 16 groups that included two Alpha Ethniki teams, it happened to be drawn opponents Olympiacos and Iraklis in Group 16, that later balloted again in quarter-finals, but also AEK Athens and Panathinaikos in Group 14, that is to say the pair of the final.

== Calendar ==
Round	Main date	Fixtures	Clubs	New entries this round
Group stage	25 August & 1, 8 September 1993	56	72 → 32	72
Round of 32	27 October, 10 November 1993	32	32 → 16	none
Round of 16	15, 29 December 1993	16	16 → 8	none
Quarter-finals	19 January, 2 February 1994	8	8 → 4	none
Semi-finals	2, 16 March 1994	4	4 → 2	none
Final	20 April 1994	1	2 → 1	none

== Group stage ==
The phase was played in a single round-robin format. Each win would gain 3 points, each draw 1 and each loss would not gain any point.

=== Group 1 ===
Pos	Team	Pts
1	Naoussa	8
2	Keravnos Kolchiko	8
3	Ethnikos Asteras	5
4	Apollon Larissa	3
5	Nestos Chrysoupoli	3

=== Group 2 ===
Pos	Team	Pts
1	AEL	10
2	Ionikos	9
3	Anagennisi Giannitsa	6
4	Korinthos	2
5	Anagennisi Kolindros	1

=== Group 3 ===
Pos	Team	Pts
1	Doxa Drama	10
2	Pontioi Veria	7
3	Panelefsiniakos	6
4	Makedonikos	3
5	Erani Filiatra	1

=== Group 4 ===
Pos	Team	Pts
1	Panachaiki	9
2	Asteras Ambelokipoi	9
3	Irodotos	6
4	AO Chania	4
5	Kalamata	1

=== Group 5 ===
Pos	Team	Pts
1	PAOK	8
2	Proodeftiki	6
3	Velissario	5
4	Ethnikos Alexandroupoli	4
5	Atromitos	4

=== Group 6 ===
Pos	Team	Pts
1	Athinaikos	9
2	Kastoria	9
3	Anagennisi Karditsa	7
4	Doxa Vyronas	4
5	Acharnaikos	0

=== Group 7 ===
Pos	Team	Pts
1	Edessaikos	9
2	PAS Giannina	7
3	Ethnikos Piraeus	7
4	Chaidari	4
5	Charavgiakos	3

=== Group 8 ===
Pos	Team	Pts
1	EAR	9
2	Levadiakos	9
3	Nigrita	6
4	Panarkadikos	3
5	Veria	3

=== Group 9 ===
Pos	Team	Pts
1	Apollon Kalamarias	5
2	Panargiakos	4
3	Pierikos	4
4	Trikala	3

=== Group 10 ===
Pos	Team	Pts
1	Apollon Athens	9
2	Iraklis Ptolemaida	4
3	Kallithea	3
4	Kavala	1

=== Group 11 ===
Pos	Team	Pts
1	Pandramaikos	9
2	Aris	6
3	Panetolikos	1
4	Eordaikos	1

=== Group 12 ===
Pos	Team	Pts
1	Skoda Xanthi	6
2	Apollon Krya Vrysi	5
3	Egaleo	4
4	Pannafpliakos	1

=== Group 13 ===
Pos	Team	Pts
1	Paniliakos	5
2	Panionios	5
3	Kilkisiakos	3
4	Ialysos	2

=== Group 14 ===
Pos	Team	Pts
1	AEK Athens	7
2	Panathinaikos	7
3	Niki Volos	1
4	Keratsini	1

=== Group 15 ===
Pos	Team	Pts
1	OFI	7
2	Olympiacos Volos	6
3	Panserraikos	3
4	Aiolikos	1

=== Group 16 ===
Pos	Team	Pts
1	Olympiacos	9
2	Iraklis	6
3	A.F.C. Patra	1
4	Rodos	1

== Knockout phase ==
Each tie in the knockout phase, apart from the final, was played over two legs, with each team playing one leg at home. The team that scored more goals on aggregate over the two legs advanced to the next round. If the aggregate score was level, the away goals rule was applied, i.e. the team that scored more goals away from home over the two legs advanced. If away goals were also equal, then extra time was played. The away goals rule was again applied after extra time, i.e. if there were goals scored during extra time and the aggregate score was still level, the visiting team advanced by virtue of more away goals scored. If no goals were scored during extra time, the winners were decided by a penalty shoot-out. In the final, which were played as a single match, if the score was level at the end of normal time, extra time was played, followed by a penalty shoot-out if the score was still level.
The mechanism of the draws for each round is as follows:

- There are no seedings, and teams from the same group can be drawn against each other.

== Bracket ==
Round of 32
Levadiakos (a)	0	1	1
Athinaikos	0	1	1
Apollon Kalamarias	4	2	6
Olympiacos	2	5	7
Skoda Xanthi	4	0	4
Panionios (a)	3	1	4
Iraklis	5	8	13
Apollon Krya Vrysi	0	1	1
Panathinaikos	5	0	5
OFI	1	2	3
PAOK	1	4	5
Apollon Athens	0	4	4
Panachaiki	3	3	6
Proodeftiki	1	3	4
Doxa Drama	0	0	0
Ionikos	1	1	2
PAS Giannina	0	1	1
Pandramaikos	0	0	0
Naoussa	1	1	2
Olympiacos Volos	2	4	6
Edessaikos	1	0	1
Aris	0	2	2
Kastoria	3	0	3
Panargiakos	1	3	4
AEL	2	7	9
Iraklis Ptolemaida	1	1	2
Pontioi Veria	3	0	3
EAR	0	0	0
Paniliakos	0	3	3
AEK Athens	0	6	6
Keravnos Kolchiko	2	0	2
Asteras Ambelokipoi (a)	2	0	2

Round of 16
Levadiakos	0	2	2
Olympiacos	0	6	6
Panionios	1	1	2
Iraklis	3	1	4
Panathinaikos (p)	0	0	0(5)
PAOK	0	0	0(4)
Panachaiki	1	2	3
Ionikos (a.e.t.)	2	2	4
PAS Giannina	5	2	7
Olympiacos Volos	1	0	1
Aris	4	2	6
Panargiakos	1	1	2
AEL (a)	1	1	2
Pontioi Veria	0	2	2
AEK Athens	4	7	11
Asteras Ambelokipoi	0	1	1

Quarter-finals
Olympiacos	2	0	2
Iraklis	2	1	3
Panathinaikos	1	2	3
Ionikos	1	0	1
PAS Giannina	2	0	2
Aris	1	2	3
AEL	0	1	1
AEK Athens (a.e.t.)	1	1	2

Semi-finals
Iraklis	0	0	0
Panathinaikos	0	3	3
Aris	0	1	1
AEK Athens	0	2	2

Final
Panathinaikos (p)	3(4)
AEK Athens	3(2)

== Round of 32 ==
Team 1	Agg.	Team 2	1st leg	2nd leg
AEL	9–2	Iraklis Ptolemaida	2–1	7–1
Panathinaikos	5–3	OFI	5–1	0–2
Naoussa	2–6	Olympiacos Volos	1–2	1–4
Keravnos Kolchiko	2–2 (a)	Asteras Ambelokipoi	2–2	0–0
Doxa Drama	0–2	Ionikos	0–1	0–1
Edessaikos	1–2	Aris	1–0	0–2
Skoda Xanthi	4–4 (a)	Panionios	4–3	0–1
Levadiakos	(a) 1–1	Athinaikos	0–0	1–1
Kastoria	3–4	Panargiakos	3–1	0–3
Apollon Kalamarias	6–7	Olympiacos	4–2	2–5
Paniliakos	3–6	AEK Athens	0–0	3–6
Panachaiki	6–4	Proodeftiki	3–1	3–3
PAOK	5–4	Apollon Athens	1–0	4–4
PAS Giannina	1–0	Pandramaikos	0–0	1–0
Iraklis	13–1	Apollon Krya Vrysi	5–0	8–1
Pontioi Veria	3–0	EAR	3–0	0–0

== Round of 16 ==
Team 1	Agg.	Team 2	1st leg	2nd leg
Panathinaikos	0–0 (5–4 p)	PAOK	0–0	0–0
PAS Giannina	7–1	Olympiacos Volos	5–1	2–0
Levadiakos	2–6	Olympiacos	0–0	2–6
Panachaiki	3–4	Ionikos	1–2	2–2 (a.e.t.)
Aris	6–2	Panargiakos	4–1	2–1
AEK Athens	11–1	Asteras Ambelokipoi	4–0	7–1
AEL	(a) 2–2	Pontioi Veria	1–0	1–2
Panionios	2–4	Iraklis	1–3	1–1

== Quarter-finals ==
Team 1	Agg.	Team 2	1st leg	2nd leg
Olympiacos	2–3	Iraklis	2–2	0–1
PAS Giannina	2–3	Aris	2–1	0–2
AEL	1–2	AEK Athens	0–1	1–1 (a.e.t.)
Panathinaikos	3–1	Ionikos	1–1	2–0

== Semi-finals ==
Team 1	Agg.	Team 2	1st leg	2nd leg
Aris	1–2	AEK Athens	0–0	1–2
Iraklis	0–3	Panathinaikos	0–0	0–3

== Final ==
20 April 1994
20:15 EEST

Panathinaikos	3–3 (a.e.t.)	AEK Athens
Warzycha 32'; Manolas 54' (o.g.); Markos 116'	Report (pages 3,4)	Alexandris 72', 95'; Dimitriadis 77'
Penalties
Christodoulou (penalty scored); Georgiadis (penalty scored); Ouzounidis (penalty scored); Marangos (penalty missed); Apostolakis (penalty scored)	4–2	(penalty scored) Savevski; (penalty scored) Alexandris; (penalty missed) Tsiartas; (penalty missed) Dimitriadis

Olympic Stadium, Marousi
Attendance: 61,232
Referee: Giannis Spathas (Piraeus)
