= Alexis Alexandris =

Greek footballer

Personal information
- Full name: Alexios Alexandris
- Date of birth: 21 October 1968 (age 58)
- Place of birth: Kiato, Greece
- Height: 1.75 m (5 ft 9 in)
- Position: Striker

Team information
- Current team: Olympiacos (Youth) (manager)

Youth career
- Pelopas Kiato
- –1986: Anagennisi Kiato

Senior career*
Years	Team	Apps	(Gls)
1986–1991	Veria	104	(36)
1991–1994	AEK Athens	89	(49)
1994–2003	Olympiacos	242	(127)
2004–2005	AEL	9	(2)
2005	Kallithea	13	(4)
2005–2006	APOP Kinyras	17	(15)
Total		474	(233)

International career
1991–2002	Greece	42	(10)

Managerial career
- 2005–2006: APOP Kinyras (player-manager)
- 2008: Kerkyra
- 2009–2011: Olympiacos U21
- 2011–2012: Elassona
- 2012–2013: CS Turnu Severin
- 2013–2014: Ialysos
- 2014–2015: Aris Archangelos
- 2016: Amarynthiakos
- 2016–2018: Elassona
- 2018: Iraklis Xylokastro
- 2019–2020: Asteras Marmaron
- 2020–2021: Pankamariakos
- 2021: Amarynthiakos
- 2023–2024: AE Paros
- 2024–2025: Thyella Chalkiou
- 2025–: Olympiacos (Youth)
- * Club domestic league appearances and goals

Alexis Alexandris (Greek: Αλέξης Αλεξανδρής, sometimes wrongly called Alekos Alexandris; born 21 October 1968) is a Greek former professional footballer who played as a striker. He has won 10 Greek championships from 1992 until 2003 and is also one of the youngest players to score a hat-trick in Greek football.

== Club career ==
Alexandris began his career at his local club, Pelopas Kiato and in 1986 signed for Veria. He emerged as the top scorer of the second division in 1990 and 1991, which attracted the interest of the major Greek clubs.

On 5 July 1991 he was transferred to AEK Athens for a fee of 45 million drachmas. There he won 3 consecutive championships and emerged as the league's top scorer in 1994 with 24 goals.

In 1994 Alexandris decided not to renew his contract with the club and moved to Olympiacos. There he also had a successful career winning 7 Championships and 1 Cup. In 2004 he left Olympiacos and played for AEL and Kallithea. At the dawn of his career he was also both player and manager for APOP Kinyras during the team's first participation in the Cypriot First Division.

== International career ==
Alexandris made 42 appearances and scored 10 goals for Greece, making his debut on 27 March 1991. He was a member of the squad that participated in the 1994 FIFA World Cup group stage in the United States.

== Managerial career ==
Alexandris started his managerial career on 12 February 2008, taking over Kerkyra in second division. He left Kerkyra after a disagreement with the club's owner and then moved to Olympiacos as the manager of their U21 squad.

== Honours ==
AEK Athens

- Alpha Ethniki: 1991–92, 1992–93, 1993–94

Olympiacos

- Alpha Ethniki: 1996–97, 1997–98, 1998–99, 1999–2000, 2000–01, 2001–02, 2002–03
- Greek Cup: 1998–99

Individual

- Alpha Ethiniki top scorer: 1993–94, 1996–97, 2000–01, 2001–02
- Beta Ethiniki top scorer: 1989–90, 1990–91
- Greek Cup top scorer: 1996–97, 2000–01
- Greek Footballer of the Year: 2001
