= 1994–95 Greek Football Cup =

1994–95 Greek Cup
Tournament details
- Country: Greece
- Teams: 72

Final positions
- Champions: Panathinaikos (15th title)
- Runners-up: AEK Athens

Tournament statistics
- Matches played: 117
- Top goal scorer(s): Georgios Donis (11 goals)

The 1994–95 Greek Football Cup was the 53rd edition of the Greek Football Cup.

== Tournament details ==
Totally 72 teams participated, 18 from Alpha Ethniki, 18 from Beta, and 36 from Gamma. It was held in 6 rounds, included final.

The final was contested for second consecutive year by Panathinaikos and AEK Athens. The "greens" via fire and iron, while in their course they eliminated, inter alia, Skoda Xanthi, with a goal in the last minute of extra time, and Olympiacos, with a goal in the last minute of the match with away goals rule.

Contrary to the sensational final of 1994, the final of that season was marked by incidents on and off the pitch, by the moment that the referee, Filippos Bakas awarded a penalty in favour of Panathinaikos a few minutes before the end of extra time. This event caused protests, expulsions and riots between fans of both teams (with 21 arrests in total), while certain footballers of AEK Athens denied to attend in the title ceremony. Few days later, Bakas was attacked and wounded from an unknown person in a street near to the airport of Elliniko.

== Calendar ==
Round	Date(s)	Fixtures	Clubs	New entries
Group stage	20, 31 August, 21 September & 11 October 1994	56	72 → 32	72
Round of 32	12, 30 November 1994	32	32 → 16	none
Round of 16	21 December 1994 & 18 January 1995	16	16 → 8	none
Quarter-finals	22 February, 1 March 1995	8	8 → 4	none
Semi-finals	15,22 March 1995	4	4 → 2	none
Final	19 April 1995	1	2 → 1	none

== Group stage ==
The phase was played in a single round-robin format. Each win would gain 3 points, each draw 1 and each loss would not gain any point.

=== Group 1 ===
Pos	Team	Pts
1	AEK Athens	12
2	Panargiakos	7
3	Atromitos	6
4	Kastoria	2
5	Ethnikos Asteras	1

=== Group 2 ===
Pos	Team	Pts
1	Apollon Athens	9
2	Panserraikos	7
3	Proodeftiki	6
4	Olympiacos Volos	6
5	Pandramaikos	1

=== Group 3 ===
Pos	Team	Pts
1	Panionios	10
2	Agios Nikolaos	9
3	Kallithea	7
4	Chaidari	3
5	Velissario	0

=== Group 4 ===
Pos	Team	Pts
1	Ethnikos Piraeus	6
2	Panetolikos	5
3	Athinaikos	5
4	Chalkida	5
5	Niki Volos	4

=== Group 5 ===
Pos	Team	Pts
1	Panathinaikos	12
2	Anagennisi Giannitsa	9
3	Aiolikos	6
4	Sparti	3
5	Acharnaikos	0

=== Group 6 ===
Pos	Team	Pts
1	Iraklis	10
2	Lamia	7
3	Apollon Kalamarias	7
4	Paniliakos	3
5	Kalamata	1

=== Group 7 ===
Pos	Team	Pts
1	AEL	8
2	Korinthos	6
3	Iraklis Ptolemaida	5
4	Panachaiki	5
5	PAS Giannina	2

=== Group 8 ===
Pos	Team	Pts
1	Edessaikos	10
2	Pontioi Veria	6
3	Egaleo	6
4	Fostiras	4
5	Anagennisi Kolindros	3

=== Group 9 ===
Pos	Team	Pts
1	Ionikos	9
2	Tyrnavos	3
3	Varvasiakos	3
4	Orestis Orestiada	3

=== Group 10 ===
Pos	Team	Pts
1	PAOK	9
2	Acheron Kanalaki	4
3	Eordaikos	2
4	Apollon Krya Vrysi	1

=== Group 11 ===
Pos	Team	Pts
1	Kavala	9
2	Trikala	6
3	AO Chania	1
4	Almopos Aridea	1

=== Group 12 ===
Pos	Team	Pts
1	Anagennisi Karditsa	6
2	Panelefsiniakos	6
3	Levadiakos	3
4	Pannafpliakos	3

=== Group 13 ===
Pos	Team	Pts
1	Pierikos	6
2	Aris	6
3	Kilkisiakos	4
4	Apollon Larissa	1

=== Group 14 ===
Pos	Team	Pts
1	Skoda Xanthi	9
2	Ialysos	6
3	Veria	3
4	Charavgiakos	0

=== Group 15 ===
Pos	Team	Pts
1	Naoussa	6
2	Doxa Vyronas	4
3	OFI	4
4	AE Mesolongi	3

=== Group 16 ===
Pos	Team	Pts
1	Olympiacos	7
2	Doxa Drama	6
3	EAR	4
4	Agrotikos Asteras	0

== Knockout phase ==
Each tie in the knockout phase, apart from the final, was played over two legs, with each team playing one leg at home. The team that scored more goals on aggregate over the two legs advanced to the next round. If the aggregate score was level, the away goals rule was applied, i.e. the team that scored more goals away from home over the two legs advanced. If away goals were also equal, then extra time was played. The away goals rule was again applied after extra time, i.e. if there were goals scored during extra time and the aggregate score was still level, the visiting team advanced by virtue of more away goals scored. If no goals were scored during extra time, the winners were decided by a penalty shoot-out. In the final, which were played as a single match, if the score was level at the end of normal time, extra time was played, followed by a penalty shoot-out if the score was still level.
The mechanism of the draws for each round is as follows:

- There are no seedings, and teams from the same group can be drawn against each other.

== Bracket ==
Round of 32
Acheron Kanalaki	1	1	2
Kavala	4	4	8
Tyrnavos	0	0	0
Lamia	0	2	2
PAOK	1	0	1
Agios Nikolaos (a)	1	0	1
Ialysos	2	2	4
Anagennisi Giannitsa	0	1	1
Panserraikos	4	0	4
Skoda Xanthi	5	3	8
Panathinaikos	1	3	4
Apollon Athens	2	0	2
Anagennisi Karditsa	2	1	3
Trikala	0	2	2
Naoussa	1	1	2
Olympiacos	2	1	3
Pierikos	0	1	1
Ethnikos Piraeus	3	1	4
Doxa Drama	1	0	1
Korinthos (a.e.t.)	0	2	2
Doxa Vyronas	1	1	2
AEK Athens	3	2	5
Ionikos	1	0	1
Panetolikos	3	0	3
Panelefsiniakos	3	0	3
Edessaikos (a)	1	2	3
Pontioi Veria	1	0	1
Aris	0	3	3
AEL	5	1	6
Iraklis	0	1	1
Panargiakos	1	0	1
Panionios	3	6	9

Round of 16
Kavala	4	3	7
Lamia	0	0	0
Agios Nikolaos	1	0	1
Ialysos	1	3	4
Skoda Xanthi	0	3	3
Panathinaikos (a.e.t.)	1	3	4
Anagennisi Karditsa	1	0	1
Olympiacos	0	2	2
Ethnikos Piraeus	3	2	5
Korinthos	1	3	4
AEK Athens	4	5	9
Panetolikos	1	0	1
Edessaikos	1	1	2
Aris	0	0	0
AEL	3	1	4
Panionios	1	2	3

Quarter-finals
Kavala	3	3	6
Ialysos	1	2	3
Panathinaikos (a)	1	3	4
Olympiacos	2	2	4
Ethnikos Piraeus	0	1	1
AEK Athens	1	2	3
Edessaikos	2	2	4
AEL	0	0	0

Semi-finals
Kavala	0	0	0
Panathinaikos	1	5	6
AEK Athens	1	1	2
Edessaikos	0	0	0

Final
Panathinaikos (a.e.t.)	1
AEK Athens	0

== Round of 32 ==
Team 1	Agg.	Team 2	1st leg	2nd leg
Doxa Drama	1–2	Korinthos	1–0	0–2 (a.e.t.)
Acheron Kanalaki	2–8	Kavala	1–4	1–4
Panelefsiniakos	3–3 (a)	Edessaikos	3–1	0–2
Naoussa	2–3	Olympiacos	1–2	1–1
Ionikos	1–3	Panetolikos	1–3	0–0
Pontioi Veria	1–3	Aris	1–0	0–3
Panargiakos	1–9	Panionios	1–3	0–6
PAOK	1–1 (a)	Agios Nikolaos	1–1	0–0
AEL	6–1	Iraklis	5–0	1–1
Panathinaikos	4–2	Apollon Athens	1–2	3–0
Panserraikos	4–8	Skoda Xanthi	4–5	0–3
Pierikos	1–4	Ethnikos Piraeus	0–3	1–1
Anagennisi Karditsa	3–2	Trikala	2–0	1–2
Doxa Vyronas	2–5	AEK Athens	1–3	1–2
Tyrnavos	0–2	Lamia	0–0	0–2
Ialysos	4–1	Anagennisi Giannitsa	2–0	2–1

== Round of 16 ==
Team 1	Agg.	Team 2	1st leg	2nd leg
Kavala	7–0	Lamia	4–0	3–0
Agios Nikolaos	1–4	Ialysos	1–1	0–3
Skoda Xanthi	3–4	Panathinaikos	0–1	3–3 (a.e.t.)
Edessaikos	2–0	Aris	1–0	1–0
Ethnikos Piraeus	5–4	Korinthos	3–1	2–3
Anagennisi Karditsa	1–2	Olympiacos	1–0	0–2
AEL	4–3	Panionios	3–1	1–2
AEK Athens	9–1	Panetolikos	4–1	5–0

== Quarter-finals ==
Team 1	Agg.	Team 2	1st leg	2nd leg
Panathinaikos	(a) 4–4	Olympiacos	1–2	3–2
Kavala	6–3	Ialysos	3–1	3–2
Ethnikos Piraeus	1–3	AEK Athens	0–1	1–2
Edessaikos	4–0	AEL	2–0	2–0

== Semi-finals ==
Team 1	Agg.	Team 2	1st leg	2nd leg
Kavala	0–6	Panathinaikos	0–1	0–5
AEK Athens	2–0	Edessaikos	1–0	1–0

== Final ==
19 April 1995
20:00 EEST

Panathinaikos	1–0 (a.e.t.)	AEK Athens
Warzycha 118' (pen.)	Report (page 4)

Olympic Stadium, Marousi
Attendance: 60,777
Referee: Filippos Bakas (Thessaloniki)
