= 1993–94 Alpha Ethniki =

58th season of top-tier football league in Greece

Alpha Ethniki
- Season: 1993–94
- Champions: AEK Athens; 11th Greek title
- Relegated: Panachaiki; Apollon Kalamarias; Naoussa
- Champions League: AEK Athens
- Cup Winners' Cup: Panathinaikos
- UEFA Cup: Olympiacos; Aris
- Matches: 306
- Goals: 874 (2.86 per match)
- Top goalscorer: Alexis Alexandris; Krzysztof Warzycha (24 goals each)

The 1993–94 Alpha Ethniki was the 58th season of the highest football league of Greece. The season began on 22 August 1993 and ended on 24 April 1994. AEK Athens won their third consecutive and 11th Greek title.

== Teams ==
Promoted from 1992–93 Beta Ethniki	Relegated from 1992–93 Alpha Ethniki
Naoussa; Levadiakos; Panionios	Pierikos; Ionikos; Korinthos

=== Stadiums and personnel ===
Location of teams in 1993–94 Alpha Ethniki

Team	Manager^{1}	Location	Stadium
AEK Athens	(Bosnia and Herzegovina) Dušan Bajević	Athens (Nea Filadelfeia)	Nikos Goumas Stadium
AEL	(Greece) Christos Archontidis	Larissa	Alcazar Stadium
Apollon Athens	(Greece) Giannis Pathiakakis	Athens (Rizoupoli)	Rizoupoli Stadium
Apollon Kalamarias	(Greece) Theodoros Salapasidis	Thessaloniki (Kalamaria)	Kalamaria Stadium
Aris	(Greece) Georgios Firos	Thessaloniki (Charilaou)	Kleanthis Vikelidis Stadium
Athinaikos	(Poland) Jacek Gmoch	Athens (Vyronas)	Vyronas National Stadium
Doxa Drama	(Greece) Michalis Filippou	Drama	Doxa Drama Stadium
Edessaikos	(Greece) Aristotelis Batakis	Edessa	Municipal Stadium of Edessa
Iraklis	(Netherlands) Thijs Libregts	Thessaloniki (Triandria)	Kaftanzoglio Stadium
Levadiakos	(Greece) Stavros Diamantopoulos	Livadeia	Levadia Municipal Stadium
Naoussa	(Greece) Christos Yfantidis	Naousa	Municipal Stadium of Naousa
OFI	(Netherlands) Eugène Gerards	Heraklion	Theodoros Vardinogiannis Stadium
Olympiacos	(Greece) Nikos Alefantos	Piraeus	Karaiskakis Stadium
Panachaiki	(Greece) Giannis Pavlakis	Patras	Kostas Davourlis Stadium
Panathinaikos	(Argentina) Juan Ramón Rocha	Athens (Marousi)	Athens Olympic Stadium
Panionios	(Greece) Andreas Michalopoulos	Athens (Nea Smyrni)	Nea Smyrni Stadium
PAOK	(Greece) Stavros Sarafis	Thessaloniki (Toumba)	Toumba Stadium
Skoda Xanthi	(Greece) Giannis Gounaris	Xanthi	Xanthi Ground

- ^{1} On final match day of the season, played on 24 April 1994.

== League table ==
Pos	Team	Pld	W	D	L	GF	GA	GD	Pts	Qualification or relegation
1	AEK Athens (C)	34	25	4	5	63	28	+35	79	Qualification for Champions League qualifying round
2	Panathinaikos	34	22	6	6	82	32	+50	72	Qualification for Cup Winners' Cup first round
3	Olympiacos	34	18	14	2	63	27	+36	68	Qualification for UEFA Cup first round
4	Aris	34	18	9	7	55	34	+21	63	Qualification for UEFA Cup preliminary round
5	PAOK	34	14	9	11	45	38	+7	51	
6	Iraklis	34	13	10	11	59	45	+14	49	
7	OFI	34	13	8	13	55	42	+13	47	
8	Skoda Xanthi	34	12	9	13	62	63	−1	45	
9	Panionios	34	12	7	15	49	58	−9	43	
10	AEL	34	11	9	14	45	53	−8	42	
11	Levadiakos	34	11	9	14	38	45	−7	42	
12	Athinaikos	34	11	7	16	34	50	−16	40	
13	Apollon Athens	34	9	13	12	30	41	−11	40	
14	Edessaikos	34	11	6	17	41	56	−15	39	
15	Doxa Drama	34	11	5	18	37	64	−27	38	
16	Panachaiki (R)	34	9	10	15	36	56	−20	37	Relegation to Beta Ethniki
17	Apollon Kalamarias (R)	34	8	8	18	42	66	−24	32	Relegation to Beta Ethniki
18	Naoussa (R)	34	5	3	26	38	76	−38	18	Relegation to Beta Ethniki

Source: RSSSF
Rules for classification: 1st points; 2nd head-to-head points; 3rd head-to-head goal difference; 4th decision match.
(C) Champions; (R) Relegated

== Results ==
Home \ Away	AEK	AEL	APA	APK	ARIS	ATH	DOX	EDE	IRA	LEV	NAO	OFI	OLY	PNA	PAO	PGSS	PAOK	XAN
AEK Athens		1–0	4–0	3–0	3–0	3–2	3–1	4–1	2–1	2–1	4–2	2–1	1–2	2–0	2–0	1–0	2–0	2–2
AEL	0–0		0–0	3–1	3–1	3–0	2–0	2–0	0–1	1–1	1–1	3–1	2–2	1–0	4–4	5–0	1–1	1–1
Apollon Athens	1–3	2–0		2–0	1–2	1–1	1–0	1–1	0–0	0–0	3–1	1–0	0–0	0–1	0–0	1–0	3–1	3–1
Apollon Kalamarias	1–2	5–2	1–2		1–2	1–3	4–0	2–2	1–1	1–0	1–0	2–1	0–0	1–0	0–1	1–1	1–1	0–0
Aris	2–0	1–0	0–0	3–0		2–0	1–2	3–1	1–1	3–0	2–1	2–0	1–1	2–0	1–2	3–1	1–0	3–1
Athinaikos	1–0	1–1	3–1	3–1	0–0		1–0	3–0	1–0	0–0	1–3	2–0	0–1	0–0	1–1	0–1	4–0	2–1
Doxa Drama	1–3	1–2	0–0	2–1	1–0	1–0		0–1	1–2	2–1	3–2	0–0	0–1	3–2	1–2	3–1	1–1	1–0
Edessaikos	0–1	1–0	1–1	3–1	2–2	5–1	1–2		1–0	1–2	3–1	2–2	0–2	0–0	2–0	3–1	1–0	2–0
Iraklis	0–1	3–1	3–1	3–1	3–3	2–0	5–0	1–0		5–1	4–2	0–0	1–2	2–0	2–3	2–1	1–1	5–3
Levadiakos	0–1	0–1	0–0	2–1	1–1	3–0	3–0	2–1	4–3		3–1	1–0	0–0	5–0	1–2	1–1	1–0	1–1
Naoussa	1–3	2–3	1–0	0–1	1–4	2–0	2–3	0–1	3–3	2–1		0–0	0–5	0–1	0–3	0–1	0–1	0–1
OFI	1–2	2–1	5–1	3–1	2–0	4–0	3–2	3–0	3–3	4–0	4–0		2–0	2–0	0–0	3–0	1–0	2–2
Olympiacos	3–0	4–1	1–1	6–0	1–1	2–0	3–0	3–0	1–1	2–2	2–1	2–0		3–2	0–0	1–1	1–0	1–1
Panachaiki	0–2	1–0	0–0	5–5	0–2	0–2	2–2	2–0	1–1	1–0	5–4	3–3	2–1		0–4	1–1	1–1	2–1
Panathinaikos	1–2	5–0	3–0	5–1	1–1	5–1	8–0	3–1	2–0	3–0	2–1	4–1	1–2	1–0		3–1	2–0	5–0
Panionios	2–2	5–1	3–2	2–1	0–1	2–0	4–3	2–1	1–0	0–1	3–0	2–0	1–1	0–2	2–4		1–1	4–1
PAOK	0–0	2–0	1–0	1–1	1–2	3–0	1–0	6–1	2–0	2–0	1–0	2–1	1–1	4–1	3–1	3–2		2–1
Skoda Xanthi	1–0	3–0	4–1	2–3	3–2	1–1	1–1	3–2	1–0	3–0	3–4	2–1	4–6	1–1	2–1	6–2	5–2	

Source: RSSSF
Legend: Blue = home team win; Yellow = draw; Red = away team win.

== Top scorers ==
Rank	Player	Club	Goals
1	(Greece) Alexis Alexandris	AEK Athens	24
1	(Poland) Krzysztof Warzycha	Panathinaikos	24
3	(Greece) Fanis Toutziaris	Iraklis	19
4	(Slovakia) Milan Luhový	PAOK	15
4	(Greece) Dimitris Saravakos	Panathinaikos	15
6	(Serbia and Montenegro) Zoran Lončar	Aris	13
7	(Serbia and Montenegro) Ljubiša Milojević	Aris	12
7	(Serbia and Montenegro) Saša Škara	Edessaikos	12
9	(Greece) Vasilis Dimitriadis	AEK Athens	11
9	(Greece) Panagiotis Tsalouchidis	Olympiacos	11

== Awards ==
=== Annual awards ===
Award	Winner	Club
Greek Player of the Season	(Greece) Alexis Alexandris	AEK Athens
Foreign Player of the Season	(Poland) Krzysztof Warzycha	Panathinaikos
Young Player of the Season	(Greece) Georgios Georgiadis (Greece) Michalis Kasapis	Panathinaikos; AEK Athens
Golden Boot	(Greece) Alexis Alexandris (Poland) Krzysztof Warzycha	AEK Athens; Panathinaikos
Greek Manager of the Season	(Greece) Georgios Firos	Aris
Foreign Manager of the Season	(Bosnia and Herzegovina) Dušan Bajević	AEK Athens

== Attendances ==
AEK Athens drew the highest average home attendance in the 1993–94 Alpha Ethniki.

#	Team	Average attendance
1	AEK Athens	11,384
2	Olympiacos	10,975
3	Panathinaikos	9,450
4	Aris	6,589
5	PAOK	3,640
6	AEL	3,163
7	Iraklis	2,813
8	Skoda Xanthi	2,769
9	Panionios	2,398
10	OFI	2,337
11	Edessaikos	2,156
12	Panachaiki	1,873
13	Doxa Drama	1,692
14	Levadiakos	1,553
15	Apollon Athens	1,458
16	Apollon Kalamarias	1,404
17	Naoussa	1,203
18	Athinaikos	873
