= 1991 Greek Football Cup final =

1991 Greek Cup final
- Event: 1990–91 Greek Football Cup
Athinaikos	Panathinaikos
1	5
- on aggregate

First leg
Athinaikos	Panathinaikos
0	3
- Date: 15 May 1991
- Venue: Leoforos Alexandras Stadium, Ampelokipoi, Athens
- Referee: Kostas Dimitriadis (Piraeus)
- Attendance: 12,737

Second leg
Panathinaikos	Athinaikos
2	1
- Date: 22 May 1991
- Venue: Olympic Stadium, Marousi, Athens
- Referee: Meletis Voutsaras (Athens)
- Attendance: 19,375

The 1991 Greek Cup final was the 47th final of the Greek Cup. For the first time in the history of the institution, HFF decided in the establishment of a two-legged final, according to the model of Coppa Italia. The contesting teams were Athinaikos and Panathinaikos. It was Athinaikos' first ever Greek Cup final in their 74 years of existence and Panathinaikos' nineteenth Greek Cup final in their 83-year history. The first match took place on 15 May 1991 at Leoforos Alexandras Stadium and the second match took place on 22 May 1991 at the Olympic Stadium. Athinaikos selected as their home ground for the final Leoforos Alexandras Stadium that was the original home ground of Panathinaikos, but was vacant at the time, instead their own that was Vyronas Municipal Stadium. Since Panathinaikos won the trophy and achieved the double, Athinaikos participated in the next season's European Cup Winners' Cup, for the first and only time in their history as the runners-up. The goalkeeper of Athinaikos, Nikos Sarganis competed in a Cup final with his fourth club, after Kastoria, Olympiacos and Panathinaikos. The second leg of the final was the last match for the referee, Meletis Voutsaras.

== Background ==
Athinaikos had never competed in a Cup final.

Panathinaikos had reached the Greek Cup final eighteen times, winning eleven of them. The last time that they played in a final was in 1989, where they had won against Panionios by 3–1.

The two teams had never met each other in a Cup final.

== Route to the final ==
Athinaikos				Round	Panathinaikos			
Opponent	Result			Group stage	Opponent	Result		
Panargiakos	Unknown			Matchday 1	Apollon Kalamarias	Unknown		
Kastoria	Unknown			Matchday 2	Diagoras	Unknown		
Anagennisi Giannitsa	Unknown			Matchday 3	Aris Nikaia	Unknown		
Atromitos	Unknown			Matchday 4	Paniliakos	Unknown		
Group 5 winners: Team / Pts; Athinaikos / 8; Panargiakos / 6; Kastoria / 3; Anagennisi Giannitsa / 2; Atromitos / 1				Final standings	Group 1 winners: Team / Pts; Panathinaikos / 7; Apollon Kalamarias / 5; Diagoras / 5; Aris Nikaia / 2; Paniliakos / 1			
Opponent	Agg.	1st leg	2nd leg	Knockout phase	Opponent	Agg.	1st leg	2nd leg
Aris	5–2	2–1 (H)	3–1 (A)	Round of 32	Proodeftiki	7–1	2–1 (A)	5–0 (H)
Anagennisi Karditsa	5–1	3–0 (H)	2–1 (A)	Round of 16	Levadiakos	2–1	2–1 (H)	0–0 (A)
Doxa Drama	3–0	2–0 (H)	1–0 (A)	Quarter-finals	Ionikos	6–1	3–0 (A)	3–1 (H)
Panionios	4–3	3–0 (H)	1–3 (A)	Semi-finals	PAOK	2–1	2–0 (H)	0–1 (A)

== Match ==
=== First leg ===
15 May 1991
19:00 EEST

Athinaikos	0–3	Panathinaikos
	Report (page 1)	Kourbanas 70'; Warzycha 78'; Vlachos 89'

Leoforos Alexandras Stadium, Ampelokipoi
Attendance: 12,737
Referee: Kostas Dimitriadis (Piraeus)

Αthinaikos	Panathinaikos

GK	(Greece) Nikos Sarganis
DF	(Greece) Theodoros Boutzoukas
DF	(Greece) Giorgos Basagiannis
DF	(Greece) Tasos Chatziangelis
DF	(Greece) Kostas Theodorakos
MF	(Greece) Giannis Chatziraptis	(substituted off) 72'
MF	(Greece) Giorgos Zotalis
MF	(Greece) Vasilios Tzalakostas
MF	(Bulgaria) Hristo Kolev	(substituted off) 55'
FW	(Greece) Kostas Tsavalias
FW	(Greece) Vangelis Spiliotis
Substitutes:
MF	(Greece) Giorgos Anastasiou	(substituted on) 55'
FW	(Poland) Mirosław Bąk	(substituted on) 72'
Manager:
(Germany) Gerd Prokop

GK	(Poland) Józef Wandzik
DF	(Greece) Stratos Apostolakis
DF	(Greece) Giannis Kalitzakis
DF	(Greece) Nikos Kourbanas
MF	(Greece) Spyros Marangos
MF	(Greece) Louis Christodoulou
MF	(Greece) Kostas Antoniou (c)
MF	(Greece) Paris Georgakopoulos	(substituted off) 89'
MF	(Greece) Kostas Frantzeskos	(substituted off) 60'
MF	(Greece) Chris Kalantzis
FW	(Poland) Krzysztof Warzycha
Substitutes:
DF	(Greece) Giorgos Kalpakis	(substituted on) 89'
MF	(Greece) Vangelis Vlachos	(substituted on) 60'
Manager:
(Greece) Vasilios Daniil

Assistant referees:
Naoum Mintiouris (Serres)
Sotiris Vorgias (Athens)

Match rules

- 90 minutes
- Five named substitutes
- Maximum of two substitutions.

=== Second leg ===
22 May 1991

Panathinaikos	2–1 (5–1 agg.)	Athinaikos
Saravakos 71'; Kourbanas 84'	Report (page 1)	Zotalis 45' (pen.)

Olympic Stadium, Marousi
Attendance: 19,375
Referee: Meletis Voutsaras (Athens)

Panathinaikos	Αthinaikos

GK	(Poland) Józef Wandzik
DF	(Greece) Stratos Apostolakis
DF	(Greece) Giannis Kalitzakis
DF	(Greece) Nikos Kourbanas
DF	(Greece) Lysandros Georgamlis
MF	(Greece) Spyros Marangos	(substituted off) 60'
MF	(Greece) Vangelis Vlachos	(substituted off) 46'
MF	(Greece) Louis Christodoulou
MF	(Greece) Kostas Antoniou (c)
MF	(Greece) Chris Kalantzis
FW	(Poland) Krzysztof Warzycha
Substitutes:
MF	(Greece) Kostas Frantzeskos	(substituted on) 46'
FW	(Greece) Dimitris Saravakos	(substituted on) 60'
Manager:
(Greece) Vasilios Daniil

GK	(Greece) Theodoros Kantas
DF	(Greece) Giorgos Basagiannis
DF	(Greece) Giannis Tapratzis	(substituted off) 46'
DF	(Greece) Tasos Chatziangelis
DF	(Greece) Vangelis Spiliotis
MF	(Greece) Kostas Theodorakos
MF	(Greece) Giannis Chatziraptis
MF	(Greece) Apostolos Vrynios
FW	(Greece) Christos Dimopoulos
FW	(Greece) Giorgos Zotalis	(substituted off) 71'
FW	(Greece) Kostas Tsavalias
Substitutes:
MF	(Greece) Giorgos Anastasiou	(substituted on) 71'
FW	(Poland) Mirosław Bąk	(substituted on) 46'
Manager:
(Germany) Gerd Prokop

Assistant referees:
Alexandros Naziris (Thessaloniki)
Ilias Doutsias (Piraeus)

Match rules

- 90 minutes
- 30 minutes of extra time if necessary
- Penalty shootout if scores still level
- Five named substitutes
- Maximum of two substitutions

== See also ==
- 1990–91 Greek Football Cup
