= 1990–91 Panathinaikos F.C. season =

Panathinaikos
1990–91 season
- Chairman: (Greece) Yiorgos Vardinogiannis
- Manager: (Greece) Vasilios Daniil
- Alpha Ethniki: Winners
- Greek Cup: Winners
- European Cup: Round of 32
Home colours	Away colours

In the 1990–91 season Panathinaikos played for 32nd consecutive time in Greece's top division, the Alpha Ethniki. They also competed in the European Cup and the Greek Cup.

== Squad ==
Note: Flags indicate national team as defined under FIFA eligibility rules; some limited exceptions apply. Players may hold more than one non-FIFA nationality.

No.	Pos.	Nation	Player
—	GK	GRE	Antonios Nikopolidis
—	GK	POL	Józef Wandzik
—	DF	GRE	Stratos Apostolakis
—	DF	GRE	Kostas Mavridis
—	DF	GRE	Nikos Kourbanas
—	DF	GRE	Lysandros Georgamlis
—	DF	GRE	Ioannis Kalitzakis (captain)
—	MF	GRE	Kostas Antoniou
—	MF	GRE	Dimitris Saravakos

No.	Pos.	Nation	Player
—	MF	GRE	Kostas Frantzeskos
—	MF	GRE	Spiros Marangos
—	MF	GRE	Paris Georgakopoulos
—	MF	AUS	Chris Kalantzis
—	MF	GRE	Vangelis Vlachos
—	FW	POL	Krzysztof Warzycha
—	FW	AUS	Louis Christodoulou
—	FW	GRE	Giannis Samaras

== Competitions ==
=== Alpha Ethniki ===
==== League table ====
Pos	Team	Pld	W	D	L	GF	GA	GD	Pts	Qualification or relegation
1	Panathinaikos (C)	34	23	8	3	77	22	+55	54	Qualification for European Cup first round
2	Olympiacos (Note: Olympiacos were deducted 2 points.)	34	19	10	5	77	28	+49	46	1-year ban from European competitions (Note: Olympiacos were punished with a one-year ban from all European competitions by the UEFA disciplinary committee after being charged for the eventful European Cup Winners' Cup match against Sampdoria on 24 October 1990.)
3	AEK Athens	34	18	6	10	59	33	+26	42	Qualification for UEFA Cup first round
4	PAOK (Note: PAOK were deducted 3 points.)	34	16	9	9	56	39	+17	38	Qualification for UEFA Cup first round
5	Iraklis	34	14	9	11	40	36	+4	37	

Source: RSSSF
Rules for classification: 1st points; 2nd head-to-head points; 3rd head-to-head goal difference; 4th decision match.
(C) Champions

=== Greek Cup ===
==== Final ====
15 May 1991 First leg	Athinaikos	0–3	Panathinaikos	Ampelokipoi
			Kourbanas 70'; Warzycha 78'; Vlachos 89'	Stadium: Leoforos Alexandras Stadium; Attendance: 12,737; Referee: Kostas Dimitriadis (Piraeus)

22 May 1991 Second leg	Panathinaikos	2–1 (5–1 agg.)	Athinaikos	Marousi
	Saravakos 71'; Kourbanas 84'		Zotalis 45' (pen.)	Stadium: Olympic Stadium; Attendance: 19,375; Referee: Meletis Voutsaras (Athens)

=== European Cup ===
==== First round ====
19 September 1990 First leg	Lech Poznań (Poland)	3–0	(Greece) Panathinaikos	Poznań, Poland
20:00 CEST	Jakołcewicz 2' (pen.), 19'; Rzepka 64'	Report		Stadium: Municipal Stadium; Attendance: 12,220; Referee: Erik Fredriksson (Sweden)

3 October 1990 Second leg	Panathinaikos (Greece)	1–2 (1–5 agg.)	(Poland) Lech Poznań	Athens, Greece
19:00 CEST	Saravakos 44'	Report	Pachelski 68'; Moskal 85'	Stadium: Olympic Stadium; Attendance: 49,500; Referee: Bruno Galler (Switzerland)
