= 1991–92 Panathinaikos F.C. season =

Panathinaikos
1991–92 season
- Chairman: (Greece) Yiorgos Vardinogiannis
- Manager: (Greece) Vasilios Daniil
- Alpha Ethniki: 3rd
- Greek Cup: Quarter-finals
- European Cup: Quarter-finals
Home colours	Away colours

In the 1991–92 season Panathinaikos played for 33rd consecutive time in Greece's top division, the Alpha Ethniki. They also competed in the European Cup and the Greek Cup.

== Squad ==
Note: Flags indicate national team as defined under FIFA eligibility rules; some limited exceptions apply. Players may hold more than one non-FIFA nationality.

No.	Pos.	Nation	Player
—	GK	GRE	Antonios Nikopolidis
—	GK	POL	Józef Wandzik
—	DF	GRE	Stratos Apostolakis
—	DF	GRE	Kostas Mavridis
—	DF	GRE	Nikos Kourbanas
—	DF	GRE	Lysandros Georgamlis
—	DF	GRE	Nikos Karageorgiou
—	DF	GRE	Ioannis Kalitzakis (captain)
—	MF	GRE	Georgios Donis
—	MF	GRE	Kostas Antoniou

No.	Pos.	Nation	Player
—	MF	GRE	Dimitris Saravakos
—	MF	GRE	Kostas Frantzeskos
—	MF	GRE	Spiros Marangos
—	MF	GRE	Paris Georgakopoulos
—	MF	AUS	Chris Kalantzis
—	MF	ARG	Juan José Borrelli
—	FW	POL	Krzysztof Warzycha
—	FW	AUS	Louis Christodoulou
—	FW	GRE	Georgios Athanasiadis

== Competitions ==
=== Alpha Ethniki ===
==== League table ====
Pos	Team	Pld	W	D	L	GF	GA	GD	Pts	Qualification or relegation
1	AEK Athens (C)	34	23	8	3	72	25	+47	54	Qualification for Champions League first round
2	Olympiacos	34	20	11	3	74	30	+44	51	Qualification for Cup Winners' Cup first round
3	Panathinaikos	34	21	6	7	66	21	+45	48	Qualification for UEFA Cup first round
4	PAOK	34	13	13	8	44	44	0	39	Qualification for UEFA Cup first round
5	Apollon Athens	34	14	7	13	35	34	+1	35	

Source: RSSSF
Rules for classification: 1st points; 2nd head-to-head points; 3rd head-to-head goal difference; 4th decision match.
(C) Champions

=== European Cup ===
==== First round ====
18 September 1991 First leg	Fram Reykjavík (Iceland)	2–2	(Greece) Panathinaikos	Reykjavík, Iceland
	Ragnarsson 57'; Arnþórsson 62'	Report	Christodoulou 38', 72'	Stadium: Laugardalsvöllur; Attendance: 695; Referee: Alan Snoddy (Northern Ireland)

2 October 1991 Second leg	Panathinaikos (Greece)	0–0 (2a–2 agg.)	(Iceland) Fram Reykjavík	Athens, Greece
		Report		Stadium: Olympic Stadium; Attendance: 50,000; Referee: Astrit Canaj (Albania)

==== Second round ====
23 October 1991 First leg	Panathinaikos (Greece)	2–0	(Sweden) IFK Göteborg	Athens, Greece
	Saravakos 27'; Marangos 49'	Report		Stadium: Olympic Stadium; Attendance: 55,000; Referee: Neil Midgley (England)

6 November 1991 Second leg	IFK Göteborg (Sweden)	2–2 (2–4 agg.)	(Greece) Panathinaikos	Gothenburg, Sweden
	Svensson 23'; Ekström 37'	Report	Saravakos 60', 81' (pen.)	Stadium: Ullevi; Attendance: 10,684; Referee: Ryszard Wójcik (Poland)

==== Group stage ====
Group A

Pos	Team	Pld	W	D	L	GF	GA	GD	Pts	Qualification
1	(Italy) Sampdoria	6	3	2	1	10	5	+5	8	Advance to final
2	(Socialist Federal Republic of Yugoslavia) Red Star Belgrade	6	3	0	3	9	10	−1	6	
3	(Belgium) Anderlecht	6	2	2	2	8	9	−1	6	
4	(Greece) Panathinaikos	6	0	4	2	1	4	−3	4	

Source: UEFA

27 November 1991 1	Anderlecht (Belgium)	0–0	(Greece) Panathinaikos	Brussels, Belgium
20:15		Report		Stadium: Constant Vanden Stock Stadium; Attendance: 16,500; Referee: Brian McGinlay (Scotland)

11 December 1991 2	Panathinaikos (Greece)	0–0	(Italy) Sampdoria	Athens, Greece
20:00		Report		Stadium: Olympic Stadium; Attendance: 51,500; Referee: Hubert Forstinger (Austria)

4 March 1992 3	Panathinaikos (Greece)	0–2	(Socialist Federal Republic of Yugoslavia) Red Star Belgrade	Athens, Greece
20:00		Report	Pančev 70', 87'	Stadium: Olympic Stadium; Attendance: 55,311; Referee: Alexey Spirin (Russia)

18 March 1992 4	Red Star Belgrade (Socialist Federal Republic of Yugoslavia)	1–0	(Greece) Panathinaikos	Sofia, Bulgaria (Note: Match was played in Bulgaria since UEFA suspended Yugoslav teams from playing their home matches in Yugoslavia due to the deteriorating security situation in the country caused by the ethnic incidents that eventually turned into the Yugoslav Wars.)
20:15	Mihajlović 53' (pen.)	Report		Stadium: Balgarska Armiya Stadium; Attendance: 20,000; Referee: Emilio Soriano Aladrén (Spain)

1 April 1992 5	Panathinaikos (Greece)	0–0	(Belgium) Anderlecht	Athens, Greece
19:30		Report		Stadium: Olympic Stadium; Attendance: 40,000; Referee: Joe Worrall (England)

15 April 1992 6	Sampdoria (Italy)	1–1	(Greece) Panathinaikos	Genoa, Italy
20:15	Mancini 36'	Report	Marangos 27'	Stadium: Stadio Luigi Ferraris; Attendance: 34,500; Referee: Kurt Röthlisberger (Switzerland)
