= 1994–95 Panathinaikos F.C. season =

Panathinaikos
1994–95 season
- Chairman: (Greece) Yiorgos Vardinogiannis
- Manager: (Argentina) Juan Ramón Rocha
- Alpha Ethniki: 1st
- Greek Cup: Winners
- Cup Winners' Cup: Round of 16
Home colours	Away colours

In the 1994–95 season Panathinaikos played for 36th consecutive time in Greece's top division, the Alpha Ethniki. They also competed in the UEFA Cup Winners' Cup and the Greek Cup.

== Squad ==
Note: Flags indicate national team as defined under FIFA eligibility rules; some limited exceptions apply. Players may hold more than one non-FIFA nationality.

No.	Pos.	Nation	Player
—	GK	GRE	Antonios Nikopolidis
—	GK	POL	Józef Wandzik
—	DF	GRE	Stratos Apostolakis
—	DF	GRE	Giannis Goumas
—	DF	GRE	Ioannis Kalitzakis (captain)
—	DF	GRE	Thanasis Kolitsidakis
—	DF	GRE	Marinos Ouzounidis
—	MF	GRE	Georgios Georgiadis
—	DF	GRE	Georgios Alexopoulos
—	MF	GRE	Andreas Lagonikakis
—	MF	GRE	Georgios Donis
—	DF	GRE	Georgios Savvas Georgiadis
—	MF	GRE	Andreas Lagonikakis

No.	Pos.	Nation	Player
—	MF	GRE	Spyros Marangos
—	MF	GRE	Dimitris Markos
—	MF	GRE	Nikos Nioplias
—	MF	ARG	Juan José Borrelli
—	MF	GRE	Tasos Mitropoulos
—	FW	GRE	Alexis Alexoudis
—	FW	POL	Krzysztof Warzycha
—	FW	AUS	Louis Christodoulou
—	FW	GRE	Georgios Kapouranis

== Competitions ==
=== Alpha Ethniki ===
==== League table ====
Pos	Team	Pld	W	D	L	GF	GA	GD	Pts	Qualification or relegation
1	Panathinaikos (C)	34	26	5	3	83	21	+62	83	Qualification for Champions League qualifying round
2	Olympiacos	34	20	7	7	69	31	+38	67	Qualification for UEFA Cup preliminary round
3	PAOK	34	20	5	9	55	29	+26	65	1-year ban from European competitions (Note: On 1 October 1992, PAOK vs Paris Saint-Germain UEFA Cup match was abandoned due to crowd violence and PAOK were punished with a two-year ban from all European competitions by the UEFA disciplinary committee. The sentence was later reduced to one year.)
4	Apollon Athens	34	20	3	11	61	37	+24	63	Qualification for UEFA Cup preliminary round
5	AEK Athens	34	17	11	6	61	33	+28	62	Qualification for Cup Winners' Cup first round (Note: Since Panathinaikos who were the 1994–95 Greek Football Cup winner, were qualified for the 1995–96 UEFA Champions League, the runner-up, AEK Athens took their place in the first round of the 1995–96 UEFA Cup Winners' Cup.)

Source: RSSSF
Rules for classification: 1st points; 2nd head-to-head points; 3rd head-to-head goal difference; 4th decision match.
(C) Champions

=== Greek Cup ===
==== Final ====
19 April 1995	Panathinaikos	1–0 (a.e.t.)	AEK Athens	Marousi
20:00 EEST	Warzycha 118' (pen.)	Report (page 4)		Stadium: Olympic Stadium; Attendance: 60,777; Referee: Filippos Bakas (Thessaloniki)

=== Greek Super Cup ===
17 August 1994 Final	Panathinaikos	0–3	Panathinaikos	Marousi
21:00 EEST (UTC+3)	Borbokis (yellow card) 39'; Tsiartas (yellow card) 53'; Kasapis (yellow card) 72'; Koutoulas (yellow card) 76'	Report	Ouzounidis 30'; Apostolakis 76' (pen.), (yellow card) 79'; Markos 86'	Stadium: Olympic Stadium; Attendance: 15,457; Referee: Thanasis Zachariadis (Thessaloniki)

=== Cup Winners' Cup ===
==== First round ====
15 September 1994 First leg	Pirin Blagoevgrad (Bulgaria)	0–2	(Greece) Panathinaikos	Blagoevgrad, Bulgaria
17:00		Report	Nioplias 70'; Alexoudis 83'	Stadium: Hristo Botev Stadium; Attendance: 11,972; Referee: Iouri Tchebotarev (Russia)

29 September 1994 Second leg	Panathinaikos (Greece)	6–1 (8–1 agg.)	(Bulgaria) Pirin Blagoevgrad	Athens, Greece
20:00	Alexoudis 7', 18'; Warzycha 31', 86', 90'; Borelli 65'	Report	Orachev 44'	Stadium: Olympic Stadium; Attendance: 22,230; Referee: Svend Christensen (Denmark)

==== Second round ====
20 October 1994 First leg	Club Brugge (Belgium)	1–0	(Greece) Panathinaikos	Bruges, Belgium
20:30	Staelens 6' (pen.)	Report		Stadium: Jan Breydel Stadium; Attendance: 14,760; Referee: Marc Batta (France)

3 November 1994 Second leg	Panathinaikos (Greece)	0–0 (0–1 agg.)	(Belgium) Club Brugge	Athens, Greece
21:30		Report		Stadium: Olympic Stadium; Attendance: 67,133; Referee: Bernd Heynemann (Germany)
