= 1995–96 Panathinaikos F.C. season =

Panathinaikos
1995–96 season
- Chairman: (Greece) Yiorgos Vardinogiannis
- Manager: (Argentina) Juan Ramón Rocha
- Alpha Ethniki: 1st
- Greek Cup: Quarter-finals
- Champions League: Semi-finals
Home colours	Away colours	Third colours

In the 1995–96 season Panathinaikos played for 37th consecutive time in Greece's top division, the Alpha Ethniki. They also competed in the Champions League and Greek Cup.

== Squad ==
Note: Flags indicate national team as defined under FIFA eligibility rules; some limited exceptions apply. Players may hold more than one non-FIFA nationality.

No.	Pos.	Nation	Player
—	GK	GRE	Antonios Nikopolidis
—	GK	POL	Józef Wandzik
—	DF	GRE	Stratos Apostolakis
—	DF	GRE	Giannis Goumas
—	DF	GRE	Ioannis Kalitzakis (captain)
—	DF	GRE	Thanasis Kolitsidakis
—	DF	GRE	Marinos Ouzounidis
—	MF	GRE	Angelos Basinas
—	MF	GRE	Georgios Donis
—	DF	GRE	Georgios Savvas Georgiadis
—	MF	GRE	Andreas Lagonikakis

No.	Pos.	Nation	Player
—	MF	GRE	Spyros Marangos
—	MF	GRE	Dimitris Markos
—	MF	GRE	Nikos Nioplias
—	MF	GRE	Georgios Georgiadis
—	MF	ARG	Juan José Borrelli
—	FW	GRE	Alexis Alexoudis
—	FW	POL	Krzysztof Warzycha
—	FW	AUS	Louis Christodoulou
—	FW	GRE	Georgios Kafes
—	DF	GRE	Georgios Kapouranis
—	FW	GRE	Giannis Thomaidis

== Competitions ==
=== Alpha Ethniki ===
==== League table ====
Pos	Team	Pld	W	D	L	GF	GA	GD	Pts	Qualification or relegation
1	Panathinaikos (C)	34	26	5	3	72	22	+50	83	Qualification for Champions League qualifying round
2	AEK Athens	34	25	6	3	87	22	+65	81	Qualification for Cup Winners' Cup first round
3	Olympiacos	34	19	8	7	66	34	+32	65	Qualification for UEFA Cup first round
4	Iraklis	34	17	7	10	51	39	+12	58	Qualification for UEFA Cup qualifying round
5	OFI	34	17	6	11	57	52	+5	57	

Source: RSSSF
Rules for classification: 1st points; 2nd head-to-head points; 3rd head-to-head goal difference; 4th decision match.
(C) Champions

=== UEFA Champions League ===
==== Qualifying round ====
9 August 1995 First leg	Panathinaikos (Greece)	0–0	(Croatia) Hajduk Split	Athens, Greece
		Report		Stadium: Olympic Stadium; Attendance: 0 (the game became under closed doors); Referee: Urs Meier (Switzerland)

23 August 1995 Second leg	Hajduk Split (Croatia)	1–1 (1–1a agg.)	(Greece) Panathinaikos	Rijeka, Croatia
	Štimac 5'	Report	Borelli 54'	Stadium: Stadion Kantrida; Attendance: 10,800; Referee: Ion Craciunescu (Romania)

==== Group A ====
Pos	Team	Pld	W	D	L	GF	GA	GD	Pts	Qualification
1	(Greece) Panathinaikos	6	3	2	1	7	3	+4	11	Advance to knockout stage
2	(France) Nantes	6	2	3	1	8	6	+2	9	Advance to knockout stage
3	(Portugal) Porto	6	1	4	1	6	5	+1	7	
4	(Denmark) AaB (Note: After matchday 1 in the group, AaB replaced Dynamo Kyiv, who were banned following a failed attempt to bribe a referee.)	6	1	1	4	5	12	−7	4	

Source: UEFA
Notes:

27 September 1995 2	Panathinaikos (Greece)	3–1	(France) Nantes	Athens, Greece
21:30	Georgiadis 17'; Warzycha 30', 46'	Report	N'Doram 88'	Stadium: Olympic Stadium; Attendance: 58,656; Referee: Vadim Zhuk (Belarus)

18 October 1995 3	Porto (Portugal)	0–1	(Greece) Panathinaikos	Porto, Portugal
19:30		Report	Markos 41'	Stadium: Estádio das Antas; Attendance: 17,920; Referee: Alfredo Trentalange (Italy)

25 October 1995 1	Aalborg BK (Denmark)	2–1	(Greece) Panathinaikos	Aalborg, Denmark
20:30	Andersen 7'; Madsen 90'	Report	Warzycha 41'	Stadium: Aalborg; Attendance: 6,100; Referee: Hellmut Krug (Germany)

1 November 1995 4	Panathinaikos (Greece)	0–0	(Portugal) Porto	Athens, Greece
21:30		Report		Stadium: Olympic Stadium; Attendance: 59,336; Referee: Guy Goethals (Belgium)

22 November 1995 5	Panathinaikos (Greece)	2–0	(Denmark) Aalborg BK	Athens, Greece
21:30	Alexoudis 1'; Georgiadis 39'	Report		Stadium: Olympic Stadium; Attendance: 32,532; Referee: Vaclav Krondl (Czech Republic)

6 December 1995 6	Nantes (France)	0–0	(Greece) Panathinaikos	Nantes, France
20:30		Report		Stadium: La Beaujoire; Attendance: 30,000; Referee: Leif Sundell (Sweden)

==== Knockout stage ====
===== Quarter-finals =====
6 March 1996 First leg	Legia Warsaw (Poland)	0–0	(Greece) Panathinaikos	Warsaw, Poland
20:30		Report		Stadium: Wojska Polskiego; Attendance: 12,000; Referee: Manuel Díaz Vega (Spain)

20 March 1996 Second leg	Panathinaikos (Greece)	3–0 (3–0 agg.)	(Poland) Legia Warsaw	Athens, Greece
21:30	Warzycha 33', 57'; Borrelli 71'	Report		Stadium: Olympic Stadium; Attendance: 70,039; Referee: Sergei Khusainov (Russia)

===== Semi-finals =====
3 April 1996 First leg	Ajax (Netherlands)	0–1	(Greece) Panathinaikos	Amsterdam, Netherlands
20:30		Report	Warzycha 87'	Stadium: Olympic Stadium; Attendance: 30,507; Referee: László Vágner (Hungary)

17 April 1996 Second leg	Panathinaikos (Greece)	0–3 (1–3 agg.)	(Netherlands) Ajax	Athens, Greece
21:30		Report	Litmanen 4', 77'; Wooter 86'	Stadium: Olympic Stadium; Attendance: 73,529; Referee: José María García-Aranda (Spain)

== Team kit ==
Home	Away	Third	Third (2)
