= 1989 Greek Football Cup final =

1989 Greek Cup final
- Event: 1988–89 Greek Football Cup
Panionios	Panathinaikos
1	3
- Date: 11 May 1989
- Venue: Olympic Stadium, Marousi, Athens
- Referee: Alekos Naziris (Thessaloniki)
- Attendance: 54,183

The 1989 Greek Cup final was the 45th final of the Greek Cup. The match took place on 11 May 1989 at the Olympic Stadium. The contesting teams were Panionios and Panathinaikos. It was Panionios' fifth Greek Cup final in their 99 years of existence and Panathinaikos' eighteenth Greek Cup final and second consecutive in their 81-year history. Only the last 30 minutes of the match were televised due to the sudden strike of the employees of ERT, which was interrupted at the request of the viewers.

== Venue ==
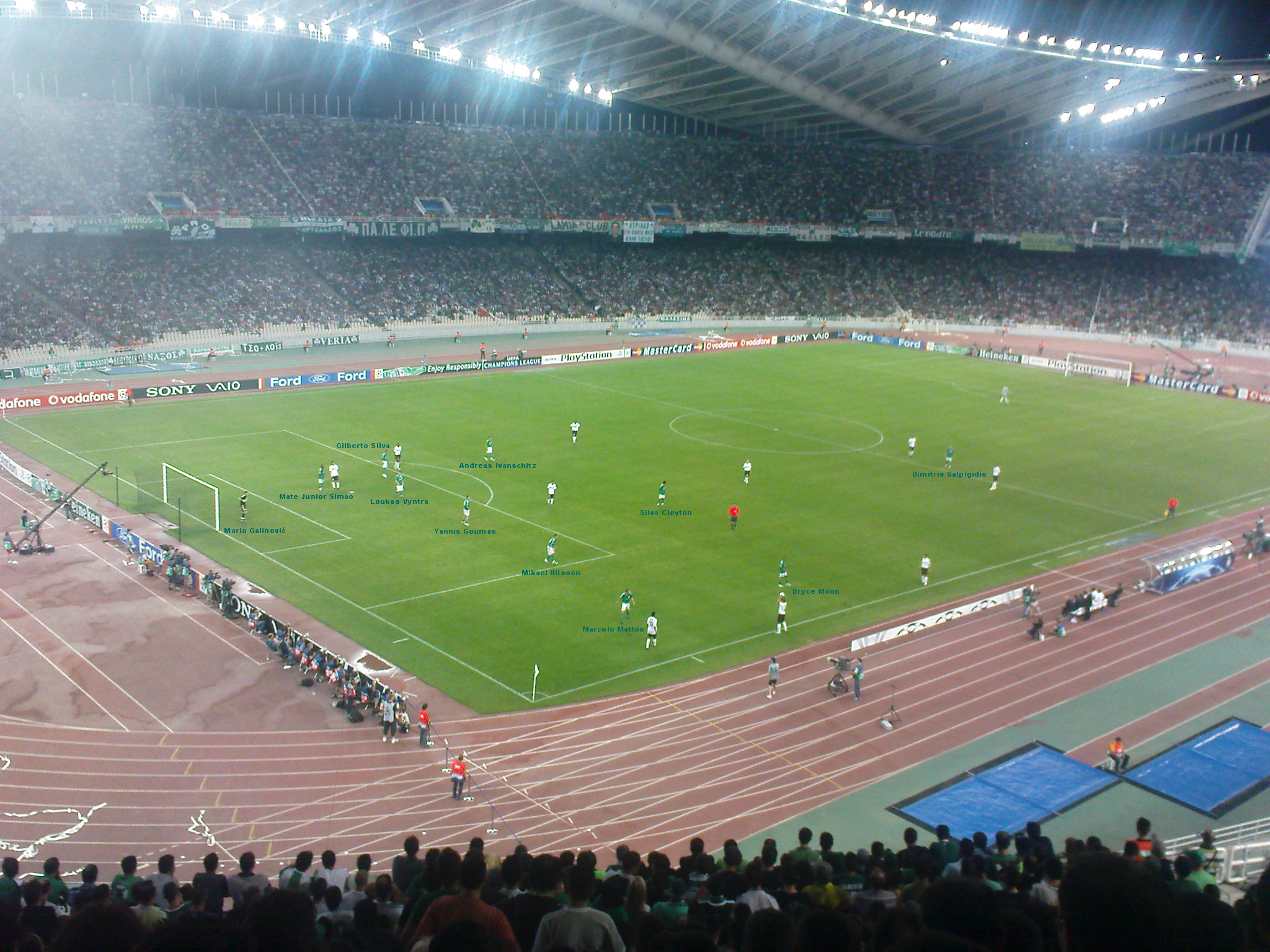
Athens Olympic Stadium.

This was the seventh Greek Cup final held at the Athens Olympic Stadium, after the 1983, 1984, 1985, 1986, 1987 and 1988 finals.

The Athens Olympic Stadium was built in 1982. The stadium is used as a venue for Panathinaikos, Olympiacos and Greece and was used for AEK Athens on various occasions. Its current capacity is 80,000 and hosted a European Cup final in 1983 and a European Cup Winners' Cup final in 1987.

== Background ==
Panionios had reached the Greek Cup final four times, winning one of them. The last time that they played in a final was in 1979, where they had won against AEK Athens by 3–1.

Panathinaikos had reached the Greek Cup final seventeen times, winning ten of them. The last time that they played in a final was in 1988, where they had won against Olympiacos by 4–3 on penalties, which came after a 2–2 draw at the end of the extra time.

The two teams had met each other in a Cup final one time in the 1967 final.

== Route to the final ==
Panionios				Round	Panathinaikos			
Opponent	Result			Group stage	Opponent	Result		
Naoussa	Unknown			Matchday 1	Eordaikos	Unknown		
Charavgiakos	Unknown			Matchday 2	Kozani	Unknown		
Trikala	Unknown			Matchday 3	Not played			
Group 2 winners: Team / Pts; Panionios / 5; Naoussa / 3; Charavgiakos / 2; Trikala / 2				Final standings	Group 15 winners: Team / Pts; Panathinaikos / 4; Kozani / 2; Eordaikos / 0			
Opponent	Agg.	1st leg	2nd leg	Knockout phase	Opponent	Agg.	1st leg	2nd leg
Sparta	4–1	4–0 (H)	0–1 (A)	Round of 32	Olympiacos Volos	5–2	3–1 (H)	2–1 (A)
Aris	3–2	3–0 (H)	0–2 (A)	Round of 16	Panachaiki	9–3	1–2 (A)	8–1 (H)
PAOK	3–2	0–2 (A)	3–0 (a.e.t.) (H)	Quarter-finals	PAS Giannina	3–1	3–0 (A)	0–1 (H)
AEL	2–0	2–0 (H)	0–0 (A)	Semi-finals	Ethnikos Piraeus	4–0	2–0 (H)	2–0 (A)

== Match ==
=== Details ===
11 May 1989
21:00 EEST

Panionios	1–3	Panathinaikos
Zakkas 35'	Report (page 5)	Mavridis 8'; Dimopoulos 44' (pen.); Saravakos 46'

Olympic Stadium, Marousi
Attendance: 54,183
Referee: Alekos Naziris (Thessaloniki)

Panionios	Panathinaikos

GK	1	(Greece) Theologis Papadopoulos
DF	2	(Greece) Makis Chatzimoisiadis
DF	3	(Greece) Giannis Papoulidis
DF	4	(Greece) Christos Koutropoulos (c)
DF	5	(Greece) Giorgos Toyias
MF	10	(Greece) Spyros Marangos
MF	6	(Greece) Thanasis Kanaras	(substituted off) 51'
MF	7	(Greece) Petros Michos
MF	8	(Greece) Stelios Aposporis	(substituted off) 70'
FW	9	(Greece) Theodoros Zakkas
FW	11	(Greece) Thomas Mavros
Substitutes:
GK	15	(Greece) Antonis Manikas
DF	14	(Greece) Giorgos Kapouranis
DF	16	(Greece) Charis Kopitsis
MF	12	(Greece) Vasilios Vasilakos	(substituted on) 51'
FW	13	(Albania) Luigjm Bersemi	(substituted on) 70'
Manager:
(Sweden) Bo Johansson

GK	1	(Greece) Nikos Sarganis
DF	2	(Greece) Iakovos Chatziathanasiou
DF	4	(Greece) Chris Kalantzis
DF	5	(Greece) Giannis Kalitzakis
DF	6	(Greece) Kostas Mavridis (c)
MF	7	(Greece) Dimitris Saravakos
MF	8	(Greece) Kostas Antoniou
MF	10	(Greece) Paris Georgakopoulos	(substituted off) 71'
MF	11	(Greece) Lysandros Georgamlis
FW	3	(Greece) Giannis Samaras
FW	9	(Greece) Christos Dimopoulos	(substituted off) 78'
Substitutes:
GK	15	(Greece) Giorgos Abadiotakis
DF	12	(Greece) Nikos Kourbanas	(substituted on) 78'
MF	14	(Argentina) Juan Ramón Rocha	(substituted on) 71'
MF	16	(Hungary) József Fitos
FW	13	(Denmark) Claus Nielsen
Manager:
(Sweden) Gunder Bengtsson

Assistant referees:
Theodoros Kefalas (Athens)
Lefteris Filippidis (Patras)

Match rules

- 90 minutes
- 30 minutes of extra time if necessary
- Penalty shootout if scores still level
- Five named substitutes
- Maximum of two substitutions

== See also ==
- 1988–89 Greek Football Cup
