= 1997–98 Alpha Ethniki =

62nd season of top-tier football league in Greece

Alpha Ethniki
- Season: 1997–98
- Champions: Olympiacos; 27th Greek title
- Relegated: Panachaiki; Kalamata; Athinaikos
- Champions League: Olympiacos; Panathinaikos
- UEFA Cup: AEK Athens; PAOK
- Cup Winners' Cup: Panionios
- Intertoto Cup: Iraklis
- Matches: 306
- Goals: 843 (2.75 per match)
- Top goalscorer: Krzysztof Warzycha (32 goals)

The 1997–98 Alpha Ethniki was the 62nd season of the highest football league of Greece. The season began on 30 August 1997 and ended on 18 May 1998. Olympiacos won their second consecutive and 27th Greek title.

== Teams ==
Promoted from 1996–97 Beta Ethniki	Relegated from 1996–97 Alpha Ethniki
Panionios; Proodeftiki; Ethnikos Piraeus	Aris; Edessaikos; Kastoria

=== Stadiums and personnel ===
Location of teams in 1997–98 Alpha Ethniki

Team	Manager^{1}	Location	Stadium
AEK Athens	(Greece) Antonis Minou	Athens (Nea Filadelfeia)	Nikos Goumas Stadium
Apollon Athens	(Netherlands) Thijs Libregts	Athens (Rizoupoli)	Rizoupoli Stadium
Athinaikos	(Greece) Nikolaos Pantelis	Athens (Vyronas)	Vyronas National Stadium
Ethnikos Piraeus	(Greece) Georgios Ioakimidis	Piraeus (Neo Faliro)	Karaiskakis Stadium
Ionikos	(Poland) Jacek Gmoch	Piraeus (Nikaia)	Neapoli Stadium
Iraklis	(Greece) Konstantinos Maloumidis	Thessaloniki (Triandria)	Kaftanzoglio Stadium
Kalamata	(Brazil) Eduardo Amorim	Kalamata	Kalamata Municipal Stadium
Kavala	(Greece) Nikolaos Goulis	Kavala	Kavala National Stadium
OFI	(Netherlands) Eugène Gerards	Heraklion	Theodoros Vardinogiannis Stadium
Olympiacos	(Bosnia and Herzegovina) Dušan Bajević	Athens (Marousi)	Athens Olympic Stadium
Panachaiki	(Greece) Stavros Diamantopoulos	Patras	Kostas Davourlis Stadium
Panathinaikos	(Greece) Vasilios Daniil	Athens (Marousi)	Athens Olympic Stadium
Paniliakos	(Greece) Giannis Kyrastas	Pyrgos	Pyrgos Stadium
Panionios	(Greece) Christos Emvoliadis	Athens (Nea Smyrni)	Nea Smyrni Stadium
PAOK	(Greece) Angelos Anastasiadis	Thessaloniki (Toumba)	Toumba Stadium
Proodeftiki	(Greece) Nikos Karoulias	Piraeus (Nikaia)	Nikaia Municipal Stadium
Skoda Xanthi	(Greece) Giannis Mantzourakis	Xanthi	Xanthi Ground
Veria	(Greece) Stefanos Gaitanos	Veria	Veria Stadium

- ^{1} On final match day of the season, played on 18 May 1998.

== League table ==
Pos	Team	Pld	W	D	L	GF	GA	GD	Pts	Qualification or relegation
1	Olympiacos (C)	34	29	1	4	88	27	+61	88	Qualification for Champions League second qualifying round
2	Panathinaikos	34	28	1	5	90	24	+66	85	Qualification for Champions League second qualifying round
3	AEK Athens	34	22	8	4	61	30	+31	74	Qualification for UEFA Cup second qualifying round
4	PAOK	34	21	7	6	74	41	+33	70	Qualification for UEFA Cup second qualifying round
5	Ionikos	34	18	8	8	46	31	+15	62	
6	Iraklis	34	14	9	11	49	45	+4	51	Qualification for Intertoto Cup second round
7	OFI	34	15	4	15	45	53	−8	49	
8	Skoda Xanthi	34	13	6	15	52	52	0	45	
9	Veria	34	12	6	16	38	48	−10	42	
10	Apollon Athens	34	10	6	18	37	51	−14	36	
11	Panionios	34	10	6	18	41	54	−13	36	Qualification for Cup Winners' Cup first round
12	Paniliakos	34	9	9	16	41	54	−13	36	
13	Kavala	34	10	5	19	40	58	−18	35	
14	Proodeftiki	34	9	7	18	35	57	−22	34	
15	Ethnikos Piraeus	34	10	3	21	27	51	−24	33	
16	Panachaiki (R)	34	9	5	20	29	62	−33	32	Relegation to Beta Ethniki
17	Kalamata (R)	34	7	8	19	27	50	−23	29	Relegation to Beta Ethniki
18	Athinaikos (R)	34	6	9	19	23	55	−32	27	Relegation to Beta Ethniki

Source: RSSSF
Rules for classification: 1st points; 2nd head-to-head points; 3rd head-to-head goal difference; 4th decision match.
(C) Champions; (R) Relegated

== Results ==
Home \ Away	AEK	APA	ATH	ETH	ION	IRA	KAL	KAV	OFI	OLY	PNA	PAO	PNL	PGSS	PAOK	PRO	XAN	VER
AEK Athens		1–0	1–1	2–1	0–2	2–2	4–2	1–0	3–0	1–0	5–1	2–1	1–2	2–0	3–0	2–1	2–0	1–2
Apollon Athens	3–4		2–0	1–0	0–2	0–0	1–0	1–2	3–0	0–5	2–1	2–5	2–0	0–0	4–4	1–0	1–2	0–1
Athinaikos	0–1	0–0		1–1	0–1	0–0	0–0	0–0	0–2	1–2	3–2	0–3	4–3	3–0	0–5	1–0	4–1	1–0
Ethnikos Piraeus	1–3	2–0	1–0		0–1	0–1	2–2	2–0	0–1	1–3	0–0	0–2	1–0	1–0	0–1	1–0	1–0	0–1
Ionikos	1–1	1–1	1–0	1–0		1–0	0–0	2–0	5–0	0–1	5–0	0–1	0–0	2–2	3–2	1–0	1–0	1–1
Iraklis	1–4	4–2	4–0	3–2	1–1		2–1	3–2	3–1	0–2	3–1	0–1	0–0	1–0	2–3	1–0	2–0	3–0
Kalamata	1–2	0–1	2–0	0–1	2–0	3–1		0–2	1–0	0–4	0–1	0–2	1–2	0–0	1–1	3–1	1–2	1–0
Kavala	1–1	0–2	1–0	2–1	2–3	2–0	5–1		3–3	0–1	4–0	0–4	1–1	1–0	0–1	0–2	2–0	0–1
OFI	1–1	2–1	1–1	3–0	0–2	1–0	1–0	3–0		2–3	1–0	0–3	3–2	3–0	2–1	3–0	2–1	3–0
Olympiacos	0–1	5–3	4–0	3–1	2–0	5–2	3–0	4–2	1–0		3–1	3–1	4–2	2–0	2–0	3–0	6–1	4–1
Panachaiki	0–0	1–0	4–1	1–0	0–1	0–1	1–1	2–0	0–2	1–2		0–1	0–4	3–2	1–4	1–1	2–1	2–1
Panathinaikos	0–1	1–0	4–1	4–2	5–1	1–0	1–0	4–1	6–2	0–2	6–1		7–0	2–1	3–1	5–0	4–1	2–0
Paniliakos	2–4	3–0	1–1	2–0	0–1	1–1	1–1	0–2	2–0	1–1	2–1	0–0		0–2	1–2	0–1	4–3	0–0
Panionios	0–1	1–3	1–0	5–1	2–2	3–1	1–2	3–0	3–0	1–2	1–0	0–3	3–1		0–3	4–0	1–1	3–1
PAOK	0–0	1–0	1–0	0–1	3–1	2–2	4–0	2–0	1–0	2–1	4–1	2–1	3–2	6–1		3–1	1–1	3–1
Proodeftiki	3–2	1–0	3–0	2–3	1–0	4–4	1–0	1–1	2–2	0–1	1–0	0–1	0–1	1–1	3–3		0–3	3–0
Skoda Xanthi	0–0	1–0	3–0	3–0	4–2	0–0	1–1	5–2	2–1	0–4	0–1	1–3	2–0	2–0	2–2	4–0		4–0
Veria	1–2	1–1	0–0	3–0	0–1	0–1	2–0	4–2	3–0	2–0	0–0	0–3	3–1	4–0	1–3	2–2	2–1	

Source: Worldfootball.net
Legend: Blue = home team win; Yellow = draw; Red = away team win.

== Top scorers ==
Rank	Player	Club	Goals
1	(Poland) Krzysztof Warzycha	Panathinaikos	32
2	(Serbia and Montenegro) Ilija Ivić	Olympiacos	26
3	(Greece) Georgios Georgiadis	Panathinaikos	21
4	(Greece) Demis Nikolaidis	AEK Athens	19
5	(Greece) Kostas Frantzeskos	PAOK	17
6	(Greece) Alexis Alexandris	Olympiacos	14
6	(Scotland) Craig Brewster	Ionikos	14
8	(Serbia and Montenegro) Predrag Đorđević	Olympiacos	12
8	(Brazil) Luciano de Souza	Skoda Xanthi	12
10	(Peru) Paul Cominges	PAOK	11
10	(Albania) Roland Zajmi	Proodeftiki	11
10	(Cyprus) Michalis Konstantinou	Iraklis	11
10	(Greece) Sakis Almanidis	Proodeftiki	11

== Awards ==
=== Annual awards ===
Annual awards were announced on 15 December 1998.

Award	Winner	Club
Greek Player of the Season	(Greece) Demis Nikolaidis	AEK Athens
Foreign Player of the Season	(Poland) Krzysztof Warzycha	Panathinaikos
Young Player of the Season	(Greece) Giorgos Karagounis (Greece) Pantelis Konstantinidis (Greece) Paraskevas Antzas	Apollon Athens; Apollon Athens; Skoda Xanthi
Goalkeeper of the Season	(Greece) Ilias Atmatsidis	AEK Athens
Golden Boot	(Poland) Krzysztof Warzycha	Panathinaikos
Manager of the Season	(Bosnia and Herzegovina) Dušan Bajević	Olympiacos

== Attendances ==
Olympiacos drew the highest average home attendance in the 1997–98 Alpha Ethniki.

#	Team	Average attendance
1	Olympiacos	16,237
2	Panathinaikos	11,108
3	AEK Athens	11,020
4	PAOK	10,745
5	Iraklis	4,002
6	Kalamata	3,481
7	OFI	2,552
8	Veria	2,520
9	Skoda Xanthi	2,454
10	Ethnikos Piraeus	2,420
11	Panachaiki	2,315
12	Kavala	2,134
13	Panionios	2,085
14	Paniliakos	1,827
15	Proodeftiki	1,793
16	Ionikos	1,570
17	Apollon Athens	1,502
18	Athinaikos	1,398
