= 2000–01 Alpha Ethniki =

65th season of top-tier football league in Greece

Alpha Ethniki
- Season: 2000–01
- Dates: 16 September 2000 – 27 May 2001
- Champions: Olympiacos; 30th Greek title
- Relegated: PAS Giannina; Paniliakos; Kalamata; Athinaikos
- Champions League: Olympiacos; Panathinaikos
- UEFA Cup: AEK Athens; PAOK
- Matches: 240
- Goals: 717 (2.99 per match)
- Top goalscorer: Alexis Alexandris (20 goals)

The 2000–01 Alpha Ethniki was the 65th season of the highest football league of Greece also known as Superior Division (Greek: Ανώτερη Κατηγορία). The season began on 16 September 2000 and ended on 27 May 2001. Olympiacos won their fifth consecutive and 30th Greek title.

== Teams ==
Promoted from 1999–2000 Beta Ethniki	Relegated from 1999–2000 Alpha Ethniki
Athinaikos; PAS Giannina	Kavala; Proodeftiki; Apollon Athens; Trikala

=== Stadiums and personnel ===
Location of teams in 2000–01 Alpha Ethniki

Team	Manager^{1}	Location	Stadium	Capacity
AEK Athens	(North Macedonia) Toni Savevski	Athens (Nea Filadelfeia)	Nikos Goumas Stadium	27,729
Aris	(Greece) Babis Tennes	Thessaloniki (Charilaou)	Kleanthis Vikelidis Stadium	23,220
Athinaikos	(Greece) Tasos Chatziangelis	Athens (Vyronas)	Vyronas National Stadium	4,340
Ethnikos Asteras	(Greece) Spyros Livathinos	Athens (Kaisariani)	Michalis Kritikopoulos Stadium	4,851
Ionikos	(Ukraine) Oleg Blokhin	Piraeus (Nikaia)	Neapoli Stadium	4,999
Iraklis	(Greece) Angelos Anastasiadis	Thessaloniki (Triandria)	Kaftanzoglio Stadium	27,770
Kalamata	(Greece) Vasilios Georgopoulos	Kalamata	Kalamata Municipal Stadium	5,613
OFI	(Greece) Ioannis Samaras	Heraklion	Theodoros Vardinogiannis Stadium	9,000
Olympiacos	(Greece) Takis Lemonis	Athens (Marousi)	Athens Olympic Stadium	69,638
Panachaiki	(Greece) Nikos Kourbanas	Patras	Kostas Davourlis Stadium	11,321
Panathinaikos	(Greece) Stratos Apostolakis	Athens (Ampelokipoi)	Leoforos Alexandras Stadium	16,620
Paniliakos	(Greece) Kostas Polychroniou	Pyrgos	Pyrgos Stadium	6,750
Panionios	(Finland) Martti Kuusela	Athens (Nea Smyrni)	Nea Smyrni Stadium	11,756
PAOK	(Bosnia and Herzegovina) Dušan Bajević	Thessaloniki (Toumba)	Toumba Stadium	28,703
PAS Giannina	(Greece) Nikos Anastopoulos	Ioannina	Zosimades Stadium	7,652
Skoda Xanthi	(Greece) Nikos Karageorgiou	Xanthi	Xanthi Ground	9,500

- ^{1} On final match day of the season, played on 27 May 2001.

== League table ==
Pos	Team	Pld	W	D	L	GF	GA	GD	Pts	Qualification or relegation
1	Olympiacos (C)	30	25	3	2	84	22	+62	78	Qualification for Champions League first group stage
2	Panathinaikos	30	20	6	4	61	20	+41	66	Qualification for Champions League third qualifying round
3	AEK Athens	30	19	4	7	61	34	+27	61	Qualification for UEFA Cup qualifying round
4	PAOK	30	14	9	7	66	48	+18	51	Qualification for UEFA Cup first round (Note: PAOK were qualified for first round of the 2001–02 UEFA Cup as Greek Football Cup winners.)
5	Iraklis	30	14	4	12	45	40	+5	46	
6	Ionikos	30	12	8	10	46	46	0	44 (Note: Head-to-head points: Ionikos 4, Aris 1.)	
7	Aris	30	13	5	12	37	41	−4	44	
8	Skoda Xanthi	30	11	5	14	24	37	−13	38	
9	Panionios	30	9	9	12	39	42	−3	36	
10	Ethnikos Asteras	30	9	7	14	34	52	−18	34	
11	Panachaiki (O)	30	9	6	15	39	56	−17	33 (Note: Head-to-head points: Panachaiki 10, OFI 4, PAS Giannina 2.)	Qualification for relegation play-off
12	OFI (O)	30	8	9	13	39	49	−10	33	Qualification for relegation play-off
13	PAS Giannina (R)	30	8	9	13	40	53	−13	33	Qualification for relegation play-off
14	Paniliakos (R)	30	7	8	15	26	46	−20	29	Qualification for relegation play-off
15	Kalamata (R)	30	4	9	17	39	66	−27	21	Relegation to Beta Ethniki
16	Athinaikos (R)	30	5	5	20	37	65	−28	20	Relegation to Beta Ethniki

Source: Galanis Sports Data
Rules for classification: 1) Points; 2) Head-to-head points; 3) Head-to-head goal difference; 4) Goal difference; 5) Goals scored; 6) Goals against; 7) Play-offs (neutral ground); 8) Draw.
(Note: Criterion 7 is only used if needed to decide champion, teams for relegation or teams for UEFA competitions).
(C) Champions; (O) Play-off winners; (R) Relegated

== Results ==
Home \ Away	AEK	ARIS	ATH	ETA	ION	IRA	KAL	OFI	OLY	PNA	PAO	PNL	PGSS	PAOK	PAS	XAN
AEK Athens		3–1	2–1	2–2	2–0	2–0	3–0	1–2	1–2	2–1	1–1	2–1	5–1	3–2	4–2	2–0
Aris	0–3		2–0	2–0	0–0	0–2	3–2	2–0	2–2	0–0	1–0	1–0	3–2	4–0	1–0	1–0
Athinaikos	0–3	2–0		1–3	2–2	2–0	3–2	2–3	1–5	3–1	0–4	1–1	2–0	3–4	0–1	2–2
Ethnikos Asteras	0–3	1–0	2–2		1–0	2–0	1–3	1–0	0–1	3–1	0–3	1–1	1–0	3–3	2–1	1–0
Ionikos	0–2	2–1	1–0	2–1		2–2	4–1	1–0	0–1	3–1	3–3	3–1	2–0	2–2	1–1	3–1
Iraklis	1–2	1–2	4–2	4–0	3–2		1–0	3–0	2–1	2–0	0–1	1–0	4–3	1–1	2–1	1–0
Kalamata	3–1	1–1	2–2	2–2	2–1	0–0		1–4	0–1	3–3	2–4	1–1	2–1	0–0	3–4	0–1
OFI	3–3	2–3	5–3	2–2	3–1	1–0	1–1		1–2	0–1	0–0	2–2	1–1	0–0	1–1	0–1
Olympiacos	4–1	4–1	1–0	6–0	3–3	3–1	5–2	5–0		3–0	1–0	2–0	2–0	1–0	3–1	4–0
Panachaiki	1–0	4–1	3–1	1–0	2–3	1–2	3–2	2–1	1–5		1–2	3–0	1–1	1–2	2–1	1–1
Panathinaikos	0–1	2–2	1–0	2–0	4–1	2–1	1–0	2–0	0–0	4–0		2–0	0–1	5–2	2–1	3–0
Paniliakos	0–3	1–2	3–0	1–0	1–0	1–2	3–1	0–0	0–4	2–2	0–3		1–1	1–1	1–0	1–0
Panionios	2–0	2–0	1–0	4–3	4–0	1–1	1–1	0–2	2–1	2–0	0–2	0–1		1–1	4–0	0–0
PAOK	2–1	2–0	3–1	2–1	1–2	4–2	7–1	4–1	2–4	5–1	2–2	3–2	1–1		2–3	3–0
PAS Giannina	2–2	2–1	3–1	0–0	1–1	3–2	2–0	1–2	1–5	1–1	0–4	3–0	2–2	1–3		1–1
Skoda Xanthi	0–1	1–0	1–0	3–1	0–1	1–0	2–1	3–2	0–3	1–0	0–2	2–0	3–1	0–2	0–0	

Source: Worldfootball.net
Legend: Blue = home team win; Yellow = draw; Red = away team win.

== Relegation play-off ==
Team 1	Agg.	Team 2	1st leg	2nd leg	3rd leg
Panachaiki	6–3	Paniliakos	2–0	2–3	2–0
OFI	3–2	PAS Giannina	1–0	0–2	2–0

== Top scorers ==
Source: Galanis Sports Data

Rank	Player	Club	Goals
1	(Greece) Alexis Alexandris	Olympiacos	20
2	(Cyprus) Michalis Konstantinou	Iraklis	18
3	(Greece) Demis Nikolaidis	AEK Athens	15
4	(Greece) Vasilios Tsiartas	AEK Athens	14
4	(Serbia and Montenegro) Predrag Đorđević	Olympiacos	14
6	(Greece) Ilias Solakis	Panachaiki	13
6	(Poland) Krzysztof Warzycha	Panathinaikos	13
8	(Croatia) Goran Vlaović	Panathinaikos	12
9	(Greece) Giorgos Kontopoulos	Ethnikos Asteras	11
9	(Greece) Nikos Liberopoulos	Panathinaikos	11
9	(Greece) Stelios Giannakopoulos	Olympiacos	11

== Awards ==
=== Annual awards ===
Annual awards were announced on 8 October 2001.

Award	Winner	Club
Greek Player of the Season	(Greece) Alexis Alexandris	Olympiacos
Foreign Player of the Season	(Serbia) Predrag Đorđević	Olympiacos
Young Player of the Season	(Greece) Giourkas Seitaridis	Panathinaikos
Goalkeeper of the Season	(Greece) Vangelis Pourliotopoulos	Panionios
Fair Play of the Season	(Greece) Angelos Anastasiadis	Panathinaikos
Golden Boot	(Greece) Alexis Alexandris	Olympiacos
Manager of the Season	(Bosnia and Herzegovina) Dušan Bajević	PAOK

== Attendances ==
Olympiacos drew the highest average home attendance in the 2000–01 Alpha Ethniki.

#	Team	Average attendance
1	Olympiacos	11,989
2	Panathinaikos	6,168
3	PAOK	6,100
4	AEK Athens	5,318
5	Iraklis	5,316
6	Aris	4,150
7	PAS Giannina	3,858
8	OFI	2,902
9	Ethnikos Asteras	2,651
10	Panachaiki	1,726
11	Panionios	1,562
12	Paniliakos	1,490
13	Kalamata	1,429
14	Skoda Xanthi	1,327
15	Ionikos	1,086
16	Athinaikos	944
