= 1996–97 Alpha Ethniki =

61st season of top-tier football league in Greece

Alpha Ethniki
- Season: 1996–97
- Champions: Olympiacos; 26th Greek title
- Relegated: Aris; Edessaikos; Kastoria
- Champions League: Olympiacos
- Cup Winners' Cup: AEK Athens
- UEFA Cup: OFI; PAOK
- Intertoto Cup: Iraklis; Panachaiki
- Matches: 306
- Goals: 787 (2.57 per match)
- Top goalscorer: Alexis Alexandris (23 goals)

The 1996–97 Alpha Ethniki was the 61st season of the highest football league of Greece. The season began on 6 September 1996 and ended on 25 May 1997. Olympiacos won their 26th Greek title and their first one in ten years.

== Teams ==
Promoted from 1995–96 Beta Ethniki	Relegated from 1995–96 Alpha Ethniki
Kavala; Veria; Kastoria	AEL; Panionios; Ethnikos Piraeus

=== Stadiums and personnel ===
Location of teams in 1996–97 Alpha Ethniki

Team	Manager^{1}	Location	Stadium
AEK Athens	(Greece) Petros Ravousis	Athens (Nea Filadelfeia)	Nikos Goumas Stadium
Apollon Athens	(Greece) Babis Tennes	Athens (Rizoupoli)	Rizoupoli Stadium
Aris	(Greece) Georgios Firos	Thessaloniki (Charilaou)	Kleanthis Vikelidis Stadium
Athinaikos	(Greece) Christos Archontidis	Athens (Vyronas)	Vyronas National Stadium
Edessaikos	(Brazil) Luiz Villa	Edessa	Municipal Stadium of Edessa
Ionikos	(Poland) Jacek Gmoch	Piraeus (Nikaia)	Neapoli Stadium
Iraklis	(Greece) Manolis Giovanopoulos	Thessaloniki (Triandria)	Kaftanzoglio Stadium
Kalamata	(Sweden) Bo Petersson	Kalamata	Kalamata Municipal Stadium
Kastoria	(Greece) Konstantinos Tsagalidis	Kastoria	Municipal Stadium of Kastoria
Kavala	(Greece) Georgios Paraschos	Kavala	Kavala National Stadium
OFI	(Netherlands) Eugène Gerards	Heraklion	Theodoros Vardinogiannis Stadium
Olympiacos	(Bosnia and Herzegovina) Dušan Bajević	Piraeus (Neo Faliro)	Karaiskakis Stadium
Panachaiki	(Greece) Andreas Michalopoulos	Patras	Kostas Davourlis Stadium
Panathinaikos	(Greece) Nikos Karoulias	Athens (Marousi)	Athens Olympic Stadium
Paniliakos	(Greece) Vasilios Daniil	Pyrgos	Pyrgos Stadium
PAOK	(Greece) Angelos Anastasiadis	Thessaloniki (Toumba)	Toumba Stadium
Skoda Xanthi	(Greece) Giannis Mantzourakis	Xanthi	Xanthi Ground
Veria	(Greece) Nikolaos Karydis	Veria	Veria Stadium

- ^{1} On final match day of the season, played on 25 May 1997.

== League table ==
Pos	Team	Pld	W	D	L	GF	GA	GD	Pts	Qualification or relegation
1	Olympiacos (C)	34	26	6	2	72	14	+58	84	Qualification for Champions League second qualifying round
2	AEK Athens	34	22	6	6	75	28	+47	72	Qualification for Cup Winners' Cup first round
3	OFI	34	20	6	8	51	28	+23	66	Qualification for UEFA Cup second qualifying round
4	PAOK	34	19	9	6	53	28	+25	66	Qualification for UEFA Cup second qualifying round
5	Panathinaikos	34	20	4	10	60	25	+35	64	
6	Kavala	34	16	7	11	42	43	−1	55	
7	Paniliakos	34	13	6	15	39	49	−10	45	
8	Ionikos	34	12	8	14	40	47	−7	44	
9	Apollon Athens	34	12	6	16	39	42	−3	42	
10	Veria	34	11	8	15	33	33	0	41	
11	Kalamata	34	10	11	13	34	50	−16	41	
12	Athinaikos	34	11	7	16	41	59	−18	40	
13	Iraklis	34	11	6	17	41	54	−13	39	Qualification for Intertoto Cup group stage
14	Skoda Xanthi	34	10	9	15	53	59	−6	39	
15	Panachaiki	34	9	12	13	31	38	−7	39	Qualification for Intertoto Cup group stage
16	Aris (Note: Aris were deducted 3 points.) (R)	34	9	11	14	32	48	−16	35	Relegation to Beta Ethniki
17	Edessaikos (R)	34	7	7	20	38	61	−23	28	Relegation to Beta Ethniki
18	Kastoria (R)	34	1	5	28	13	81	−68	8	Relegation to Beta Ethniki

Source: RSSSF
Rules for classification: 1st points; 2nd head-to-head points; 3rd head-to-head goal difference; 4th decision match.
(C) Champions; (R) Relegated

== Results ==
Home \ Away	AEK	APA	ARIS	ATH	EDE	ION	IRA	KAL	KAS	KAV	OFI	OLY	PNA	PAO	PNL	PAOK	XAN	VER
AEK Athens		2–1	5–1	6–1	2–0	2–1	6–1	6–1	1–0	2–1	0–1	2–0	2–0	3–0	2–0	1–2	2–1	3–1
Apollon Athens	1–2		1–2	1–1	2–0	0–1	4–1	3–0	2–0	2–0	0–0	0–3	2–0	0–2	2–0	0–0	2–1	3–2
Aris	3–2	1–0		0–0	2–1	0–0	0–0	0–0	2–0	1–3	1–2	0–0	0–0	0–0	1–2	0–0	2–1	2–0
Athinaikos	0–7	3–2	2–0 (Note: Athinaikos-Aris awarded 2–0, Aris forgot to present the registration ID's and health certificates of the players to the referee.)		5–2	0–1	2–0	1–1	3–0	1–4	0–0	0–1	3–1	0–2	3–0	2–3	0–0	2–1
Edessaikos	0–2	0–1	1–0	3–2		1–1	3–4	4–0	2–0	0–0	1–2	2–3	1–2	0–1	0–1	1–4	1–1	2–0
Ionikos	0–0	1–0	4–1	0–1	1–3		2–0	2–1	5–1	2–2	3–2	0–1	0–0	3–1	1–1	2–1	3–0	0–1
Iraklis	2–2	2–1	1–2	2–0	3–1	4–0		2–5	2–1	2–3	0–1	0–1	0–0	0–2	3–0	2–0	0–0	0–0
Kalamata	0–3	2–2	5–0	0–0	1–0	2–0	2–0		2–0	1–0	1–1	1–4	1–1	1–0	0–2	0–0	2–2	1–0
Kastoria	0–2	0–0	0–3	1–0	1–1	1–2	0–3	1–2		0–1	0–1	0–5	0–0	1–2	1–2	1–2	2–2	1–2
Kavala	1–1	2–1	3–1	1–1	2–2	2–0	1–0	2–0	0–0		2–1	1–2	1–0	0–4	1–0	0–3	5–2	1–0
OFI	2–1	3–0	2–2	3–1	2–1	4–0	1–0	2–0	1–0	1–0		0–1	2–1	0–0	3–1	3–1	3–0	2–0
Olympiacos	2–0	0–0	4–0	4–0	4–0	4–1	2–1	2–2	3–0	6–0	1–0		0–0	1–0	1–0	1–0	0–0	2–0
Panachaiki	1–1	0–2	1–0	3–0	3–2	2–1	0–0	0–0	3–0	1–2	2–0	0–2		3–1	1–1	2–0	1–1	0–0
Panathinaikos	2–0	0–2	1–0	4–1	4–1	1–0	4–0	3–0	7–0	2–0	1–1	0–2	2–0		3–0	5–0	1–2	1–0
Paniliakos	0–2	2–0	1–1	2–3	4–0	2–2	3–1	4–0	2–1	0–0	0–4	0–5	1–0	2–1		0–2	3–1	2–0
PAOK	0–0	3–1	2–1	1–0	1–1	2–0	2–0	2–0	6–0	3–0	2–1	0–0	2–0	1–0	1–1		4–1	0–0
Skoda Xanthi	1–2	3–0	3–2	2–3	0–1	3–0	3–4	0–0	6–0	1–0	3–0	3–5	4–3	1–3	1–0	1–1		3–2
Veria	1–1	3–1	1–1	1–0	0–0	1–1	0–1	1–0	4–0	0–1	2–0	1–0	4–0	0–0	2–0	1–2	2–0	

Source: Worldfootball.net
Legend: Blue = home team win; Yellow = draw; Red = away team win.

== Top scorers ==
Rank	Player	Club	Goals
1	(Greece) Alexis Alexandris	Olympiacos	23
2	(Greece) Kostas Frantzeskos	OFI / PAOK	22
3	(Poland) Krzysztof Warzycha	Panathinaikos	21
3	(Greece) Christos Kostis	AEK Athens	21
5	(Greece) Demis Nikolaidis	AEK Athens	19
6	(Greece) Petros Tengelidis	Skoda Xanthi	15
7	(Greece) Vasilis Andradis	Edessaikos	14
7	(Greece) Giorgos Papandreou	Kavala	14
9	(Slovakia) Igor Klejch	Panachaiki	11

== Awards ==
=== Annual awards ===
Annual awards were announced on 31 December 1997.

Award	Winner	Club
Greek Player of the Season	(Greece) Christos Kostis (Greece) Demis Nikolaidis (Greece) Kostas Frantzeskos	AEK Athens; AEK Athens; PAOK
Foreign Player of the Season	(Poland) Krzysztof Warzycha	Panathinaikos
Young Player of the Season	(Greece) Dimitrios Eleftheropoulos	Olympiacos
Golden Boot	(Greece) Alexis Alexandris	Olympiacos
Manager of the Season	(Greece) Georgios Paraschos	Kavala

== Attendances ==
Olympiacos drew the highest average home attendance in the 1996–97 Alpha Ethniki.

#	Team	Average attendance
1	Olympiacos	16,935
2	PAOK	13,406
3	Panathinaikos	8,535
4	AEK Athens	7,227
5	Aris	5,275
6	OFI	3,467
7	Kavala	3,442
8	Kalamata	3,140
9	Panachaiki	3,035
10	Iraklis	3,018
11	Paniliakos	2,239
12	Skoda Xanthi	2,127
13	Apollon Athens	1,953
14	Edessaikos	1,865
15	Veria	1,407
16	Ionikos	1,396
17	Kastoria	1,142
18	Athinaikos	805
