= 1924–25 Atromitos F.C. season =

Atromitos
1924–25 season
- Chairman: Andreas Tsouroutsoylou
- AFCA League: Semi-finals
Home colours	Away colours

The 1924–25 season of Atromitos was the 2nd in the club's history and the first season that the club were participating in the Athens Football Clubs Association League.

The chairman of the team was Andreas Tsouroutsoylou, the person that created the club.

== Athens Football Clubs Association League ==
Competition: There were two groups, from which the top two teams progressed to the final stage, where they played semifinals and then the final to determine the champion.

Atromitos were drafted in Group A and came 1st, making it to the semifinals, where they lost to Panathinaikos and got disqualified.

=== Group A ===
Pos	Team	Pld	W	D	L	GF	GA	GD	Pts	Qualification	ATR	ARM	ATH	LEN	AIAS
1	Atromitos (Q)	4	3	1	0	14	2	+12	7	Athens Final Round		1–0	2–2	4–0	7–0
2	Armeniki Enosi (Q)	4	3	0	1	10	3	+7	6	Athens Final Round	—		4–2	1–0	5–0
3	Athinaikos	4	1	2	1	10	10	0	4		—	—		4–4	2–0
4	Lenorman	4	1	1	2	9	10	−1	3		—	—	—		5–1

Source: rsssf
(Q) Qualified for the phase indicated

=== Matches ===
1924–25 1	Atromitos	7–0	Aias Athens	Athens

1924–25 2	Atromitos	1–0	Armeniki Enosis	Athens

1924–25 3	Atromitos	4–0	Lenorman	Athens

1924–25 4	Atromitos	2–2	Athinaikos	Athens

=== Athens Final Round ===
1924–25 Semi-finals	Panathinaikos	4–0	Atromitos	Athens
