= Vasilios Tzalakostas =

Greek footballer and manager

Personal information
- Full name: Vasilios Tzalakostas
- Date of birth: 20 July 1959 (age 67)
- Place of birth: Preveza
- Position: Forward

Youth career
- 1974-1975: Pyrsos Gorgomylou
- 1975-1979: Agios Thomas

Senior career*
Years	Team	Apps	(Gls)
1979–1982	Ilisiakos		
1982–1987	Athinaikos		
1987–1988	Levadiakos	10	(0)
1988–1995	Athinaikos		
1995–1996	Ethnikos Asteras		

Managerial career
- 1997: Athinaikos (caretaker)
- 2001: Atromitos
- 2002: Athinaikos
- 2003–2004: Atromitos
- 2007–2008: Panegialios
- 2014: Greece U19
- 2018–: Pelopas
- * Club domestic league appearances and goals

Vasilios Tzalakostas (Greek: Βασίλειος Τζαλακώστας; born 10 July 1959) is a Greek former football striker and later manager. He played for Athinaikos F.C. for many seasons, including in 1991 when the club played against Manchester United F.C. in the Cup Winners' Cup. He has served as the Greek national youth coach.
