= Mirosław Bąk =

Polish footballer

Personal information
- Date of birth: 23 November 1961 (age 64)
- Place of birth: Bytom, Poland
- Height: 1.75 m (5 ft 9 in)
- Position: Forward

Youth career
- Chorzowianka Chorzów

Senior career*
Years	Team	Apps	(Gls)
1978–1990	Ruch Chorzów		
1990–1995	Athinaikos	130	(28)
1995–1998	Ruch Chorzów		
1998–2001	Grunwald Ruda Śląska		
2001–2003	Szombierki Bytom		

International career
1983	Poland	1	(0)

Managerial career
- 2002–?: Szombierki Bytom (player-manager)
- * Club domestic league appearances and goals

Mirosław Bąk (born 23 November 1961) is a Polish former professional footballer who played as a forward.

After he retired from playing football, Bąk became a football coach. In 2002, he became the manager of IV liga Silesia side Szombierki Bytom.

== Honours ==
Ruch Chorzów

- Ekstraklasa: 1988–89
- Polish Cup: 1995–96
