= Paris Georgakopoulos =

Greek footballer

Personal information
- Date of birth: 23 June 1965 (age 61)
- Place of birth: Kyparissia, Greece
- Position: Midfielder

Senior career*
Years	Team	Apps	(Gls)
1981–1986	Panachaiki	78	(15)
1986–1992	Panathinaikos	75	(12)
Total		118	(15)

International career
1989	Greece	2	(0)
- * Club domestic league appearances and goals

Paris Georgakopoulos (Greek: Πάρις Γεωργακόπουλος; born 23 June 1965) is a Greek former international footballer who played professionally as a midfielder.

== Career ==
=== Club career ===
Georgakopoulos began his career with Panachaiki in 1982, before moving to Panathinaikos in 1986. Georgakopoulos represented Panathinaikos in the 1989 Greek Super Cup. He also played in the Greek Cup finals of 1989, and 1991.

Georgakopoulos effectively retired from football in 1992 after an argument with Yiorgos Vardinogiannis about his contract renewal, and he take up a career in civil engineering, although he was still contracted to Panathinaikos until 1995.

==== League statistics ====
Season	Club	Apps	Goals	Source
1982–1983	Panachaiki	4	0	
1983–1984	Panachaiki			
1984–1985	Panachaiki	22	2	
1985–1986	Panachaiki	17	1	
1986–1987	Panathinaikos	8	0	
1987–1988	Panathinaikos	9	1	
1988–1989	Panathinaikos	17	1	
1989–1990	Panathinaikos	19	4	
1990–1991	Panathinaikos	17	5	
1991–1992	Panathinaikos	5	1	

=== International career ===
Georgakopoulos earned two caps for the Greek national side in 1989.
