= 1988–89 Greek Football Cup =

1988–89 Greek Cup
Tournament details
- Country: Greece
- Teams: 52

Final positions
- Champions: Panathinaikos (11th title)
- Runners-up: Panionios

Tournament statistics
- Matches played: 97
- Top goal scorer(s): Dimitris Saravakos (7 goals)

The 1988–89 Greek Football Cup was the 47th edition of the Greek Football Cup.

== Tournament details ==
Totally 52 teams participated, 16 from Alpha Ethniki, 18 from Beta, and 18 from Gamma. It was held in 6 rounds, included final.

This season, for first time was established qualifying groups in the group stage, with Alpha Ethniki teams to be placed in the first pot. The groups would be supplemented by teams of lower divisions and the qualification would be gained by the two winners of each group. The inspiration for this process was taken by Coppa Italia and its main objective was the teams to play certain official matches before the beginning of European competitions.

With various forms, the initial round of groups took place globally in 11 editions, until 2001–02 season. The only first division team that was eliminated this year by the round was Doxa Drama.

Afterwards, the competition was marked by eventful matches and false note, initially in second round and afterwards the elimination of Olympiacos by OFI and AEK Athens by Levadiakos, but mainly in the quarter-finals, when OFI were eliminated by AEL, while after the end of second match there were clashes in the ground by footballers of both teams. Riots of lower intensity became after the end of match between Panionios and PAOK, in the same round.

The final was contested by Panathinaikos and Panionios. The two clubs were met again in a Greek Cup final after 32 years. Panathinaikos, after the group stage eliminated Olympiacos Volos, Panachaiki, PAS Giannina and Ethnikos Piraeus, while Panionios eliminated Sparti, Aris, PAOK and AEL. The "greens" repeated the success of 1967, overcoming this time 3–1. For a second consecutive year, Dimitris Saravakos was the top scorer of the competition, with 7 goals.

== Calendar ==
Round	Date(s)	Fixtures	Clubs	New entries
Group stage	21, 28 August & 4 September 1988	36	52 → 32	52
Round of 32	30 November 1988, 14 December 1988	32	32 → 16	none
Round of 16	1989	16	16 → 8	none
Quarter-finals	1, 15 February 1989	8	8 → 4	none
Semi-finals	22 March, 12 April 1989	4	4 → 2	none
Final	11 May 1989	1	2 → 1	none

== Group stage ==
The phase was played in a single round-robin format. Each win would gain 2 points, each draw 1 and each loss would not gain any point.

=== Group 1 ===
Pos	Team	Pld	GF	GA	GD	Pts
1	Achilleas Farsala	3	2	2	0	4
2	Apollon Athens	3	4	2	+2	4
3	Makedonikos	3	3	4	-1	2
4	Asteras Ampelokipoi	3	3	4	-1	2

=== Group 2 ===
Pos	Team	Pld	GF	GA	GD	Pts
1	Panionios	3	9	1	+8	5
2	Naoussa	3	3	3	0	3
3	Charavgiakos	3	5	5	0	2
4	Trikala	3	2	10	-8	2

=== Group 3 ===
Pos	Team	Pld	GF	GA	GD	Pts
1	Apollon Kalamarias	3	6	3	+3	5
2	Irodotos	3	4	3	+1	4
3	Atromitos	3	4	4	0	3
4	Ionikos	3	1	5	-4	0

=== Group 4 ===
Pos	Team	Pld	GF	GA	GD	Pts
1	AEL	3	4	1	+3	5
2	Niki Volos	3	2	2	0	3
3	Kallithea	3	3	4	-1	2
4	Pierikos	3	1	3	-2	2

=== Group 5 ===
Pos	Team	Pld	GF	GA	GD	Pts
1	Iraklis	2	9	0	+9	4
2	Sparta	2	1	2	-1	2
3	Edessaikos	2	0	8	-8	0

=== Group 6 ===
Pos	Team	Pld	GF	GA	GD	Pts
1	OFI	2	3	1	+2	2
2	Kastoria	2	3	3	0	2
3	Veria	2	3	5	-2	2

=== Group 7 ===
Pos	Team	Pld	GF	GA	GD	Pts
1	Olympiacos	2	5	2	+3	4
2	Xanthi	2	3	3	0	2
3	Kavala	2	1	4	-3	0

=== Group 8 ===
Pos	Team	Pld	GF	GA	GD	Pts
1	PAS Giannina	2	2	3	-1	4
2	Panachaiki	2	3	4	-1	1
3	Doxa Drama	2	6	4	+2	1

=== Group 9 ===
Pos	Team	Pld	GF	GA	GD	Pts
1	Levadiakos	2	3	1	+2	2
2	Korinthos	2	1	1	0	2
3	Anagennisi Karditsa	2	1	3	-2	2

=== Group 10 ===
Pos	Team	Pld	GF	GA	GD	Pts
1	PAOK	2	3	1	+2	2
2	Proodeftiki	2	2	2	0	2
3	Thriamvos Athens	2	2	4	-2	2

=== Group 11 ===
Pos	Team	Pld	GF	GA	GD	Pts
1	Panserraikos	2	1	+1	2	2
2	Olympiacos Volos	2	2	0	2	2
3	Kilkisiakos	1	2	-1	2	2

=== Group 12 ===
Pos	Team	Pld	GF	GA	GD	Pts
1	Ethnikos Piraeus	2	2	1	+1	3
2	Kalamata	2	1	1	0	2
3	Athinaikos	2	0	1	-1	1

=== Group 13 ===
Pos	Team	Pld	GF	GA	GD	Pts
1	AEK Athens	2	5	1	+4	4
2	Panarkadikos	2	3	2	+1	2
3	Egaleo	2	0	5	-5	0

=== Group 14 ===
Pos	Team	Pld	GF	GA	GD	Pts
1	Aris	2	7	0	+7	4
2	Anagennisi Arta	2	3	4	-1	2
3	Chalkida	2	0	6	-6	0

=== Group 15 ===
Pos	Team	Pld	GF	GA	GD	Pts
1	Panathinaikos	2	6	1	+5	4
2	Kozani	2	1	2	-1	2
3	Eordaikos	2	1	5	-4	0

=== Group 16 ===
Pos	Team	Pld	GF	GA	GD	Pts
1	Diagoras	2	5	3	+2	2
2	EAR	2	3	4	-1	2
3	Acharnaikos	2	2	3	-1	2

== Knockout phase ==
Each tie in the knockout phase, apart from the final, was played over two legs, with each team playing one leg at home. The team that scored more goals on aggregate over the two legs advanced to the next round. If the aggregate score was level, the away goals rule was applied, i.e. the team that scored more goals away from home over the two legs advanced. If away goals were also equal, then extra time was played. The away goals rule was again applied after extra time, i.e. if there were goals scored during extra time and the aggregate score was still level, the visiting team advanced by virtue of more away goals scored. If no goals were scored during extra time, the winners were decided by a penalty shoot-out. In the final, which were played as a single match, if the score was level at the end of normal time, extra time was played, followed by a penalty shoot-out if the score was still level.
The mechanism of the draws for each round is as follows:

- There are no seedings, and teams from the same group can be drawn against each other.

== Bracket ==
Round of 32
PAOK	3	3	6
Naoussa	0	1	1
Levadiakos	3	0	3
AEK Athens	1	1	2
Panionios	4	0	4
Sparta	0	1	1
Xanthi	1	0	1
Aris (a)	1	0	1
AEL	4	1	5
Niki Volos	0	0	0
Apollon Athens (a)	1	1	2
Korinthos	0	2	2
Irodotos	1	1	2
Kastoria	0	1	1
OFI	2	1	3
Olympiacos	0	1	1
Panserraikos	1	1	2
PAS Giannina	1	3	4
Anagennisi Arta	0	0	0
Kalamata	0	1	1
Panachaiki	6	2	8
EAR	2	2	4
Panathinaikos	3	2	5
Olympiacos Volos	1	1	2
Diagoras	1	1	2
Panarkadikos	0	1	1
Ethnikos Piraeus	4	1	5
Apollon Kalamarias	2	1	3
Achilleas Farsala	0	2	2
Kozani	3	3	6
Proodeftiki	0	1	1
Iraklis	1	2	3

Round of 16
PAOK	2	2	4
Levadiakos	2	0	2
Panionios	3	0	3
Aris	0	2	2
AEL	2	0	2
Apollon Athens	0	0	0
Irodotos	0	2	2
OFI	1	3	4
PAS Giannina	1	0	1
Kalamata	0	0	0
Panachaiki	2	1	3
Panathinaikos	1	8	9
Diagoras	2	0	2
Ethnikos Piraeus (a)	1	1	2
Kozani	1	1	2
Iraklis	2	5	7

Quarter-finals
PAOK	2	0	2
Panionios (a.e.t.)	0	3	3
AEL	2	1	3
OFI	1	1	2
PAS Giannina	0	1	1
Panathinaikos	3	0	3
Ethnikos Piraeus (a)	0	2	2
Iraklis	0	2	2

Semi-finals
Panionios	2	0	2
AEL	0	0	0
Panathinaikos	2	2	4
Ethnikos Piraeus	0	0	0

Final
Panionios	1
Panathinaikos	3

== Round of 32 ==
Team 1	Agg.	Team 2	1st leg	2nd leg
OFI	3–1	Olympiacos	2–0	1–1
Levadiakos	3–2	AEK Athens	3–1	0–1
Panathinaikos	5–2	Olympiacos Volos	3–1	2–1
Ethnikos Piraeus	5–3	Apollon Kalamarias	4–2	1–1
Apollon Athens	(a) 2–2	Korinthos	1–0	1–2
AEL	5–0	Niki Volos	4–0	1–0
PAOK	6–1	Naoussa	3–0	3–1
Proodeftiki	1–3	Iraklis	0–1	1–2
Xanthi	1–1 (a)	Aris	1–1	0–0
Diagoras	2–1	Panarkadikos	1–0	1–1
Panachaiki	8–4	EAR	6–2	2–2
Panserraikos	2–4	PAS Giannina	1–1	1–3
Achilleas Farsala	2–6	Kozani	0–3	2–3
Irodotos	2–1	Kastoria	1–0	1–1
Anagennisi Arta	0–1	Kalamata	0–0	0–1
Panionios	4–1	Sparta	4–0	0–1

== Round of 16 ==
Team 1	Agg.	Team 2	1st leg	2nd leg
Irodotos	2–4	OFI	0–1	2–3
Diagoras	2–2 (a)	Ethnikos Piraeus	2–1	0–1
AEL	2–0	Apollon Athens	2–0	0–0
Panionios	3–2	Aris	3–0	0–2
Panachaiki	3–9	Panathinaikos	2–1	1–8
PAOK	4–2	Levadiakos	2–2	2–0
Kozani	2–7	Iraklis	1–2	1–5
PAS Giannina	1–0	Kalamata	1–0	0–0

== Quarter-finals ==
Team 1	Agg.	Team 2	1st leg	2nd leg
AEL	3–2	OFI	2–1	1–1
Ethnikos Piraeus	(a) 2–2	Iraklis	0–0	2–2
PAOK	2–3	Panionios	2–0	0–3 (a.e.t.)
PAS Giannina	1–3	Panathinaikos	0–3	1–0

== Semi-finals ==
Team 1	Agg.	Team 2	1st leg	2nd leg
Panathinaikos	4–0	Ethnikos Piraeus	2–0	2–0
Panionios	2–0	AEL	2–0	0–0

== Final ==
11 May 1989
21:00 EEST

Panionios	1–3	Panathinaikos
Zakkas 35'	Report (page 5)	Mavridis 8'; Dimopoulos 44' (pen.); Saravakos 46'

Olympic Stadium, Marousi
Attendance: 54,183
Referee: Alekos Naziris (Thessaloniki)
