= Giorgos Kalpakis =

Greek footballer

Personal information
- Full name: Georgios Kalpakis
- Date of birth: 20 March 1970 (age 56)
- Place of birth: Mikrokampos Kilkis, Greece
- Position: Defender

Senior career*
Years	Team	Apps	(Gls)
1989–1992	Panathinaikos	13	(1)
1992–1994	Doxa Drama	50	(1)
–2000	Niki Volos		
2000-2003	Kilkisiakos		
- * Club domestic league appearances and goals

Giorgos Kalpakis (Greek: Γιώργος Καλπάκης; born 20 1970) is a former Greek football player that used to play as a defender for Panathinaikos and subsequently Niki Volos, Doxa Drama and Kilkisiakos.

== Links ==
- Georgios Kalpakis at FBref.com
