= Nikolaos Karydis =

Transplant surgeon

- Occupation: Transplant Surgeon
- Notable work: Transplantation for HIV positive people

Nikolaos Karydis is a transplant surgeon at Guy's and St Thomas' NHS Foundation Trust and was the first to perform a kidney transplant using an organ from an HIV positive donor. The discovery that HIV-infected organs can be used in patients with a similar HIV type significantly improves the medical opportunities for patients with HIV associated nephropathy.
