= Theodoros Zakkas =

Greek footballer

Personal information
- Full name: Theodoros Zakkas
- Date of birth: 11 December 1965 (age 60)
- Place of birth: Belgium
- Position: Forward

Youth career
- 1975–1987: Anderlecht

Senior career*
Years	Team	Apps	(Gls)
1987–1988	Eendracht Aalst	29	(6)
1988–1991	Panionios	85	(15)
1991–1993	Eendracht Aalst	53	(5)
1997–1998	La Louvière	20	(2)
1998–2000	Zottegem		

International career
1989–1990	Greece	3	(0)
- * Club domestic league appearances and goals

Theodoros Zakkas (Greek: Θεόδωρος Zάκκας; born 11 December 1965) is a former Greek footballer.

Zakkas played three seasons for Panionios F.C. in the Alpha Ethniki. He also played for Eendracht Aalst and R.A.A. Louviéroise in the Belgian First Division.

Zakkas made three appearances for the Greece national football team, during 1989 and 1990.
