= Georgios Georgiadis (footballer, born 1971) =

Greek footballer (born 1971)

Personal information
- Full name: Georgios Savva Georgiadis
- Date of birth: 30 January 1971 (age 55)
- Place of birth: Stuttgart, West Germany
- Height: 1.85 m (6 ft 1 in)
- Position: Defender

Senior career*
Years	Team	Apps	(Gls)
1989–1993	Doxa Drama		
1994–1998	Panathinaikos		
1998–2000	Aris		
2000	OFI		
2001–2002	Akratitos		
2002–2004	Ilisiakos		
2004	AEL		
2005–2007	Agios Dimitrios		
2007–2009	Doxa Drama		

International career
1996	Greece	1	(0)
- * Club domestic league appearances and goals

Giorgos Savva Georgiadis (Greek: Γεώργιος Γεωργιάδης; born 30 January 1971) is a retired Greek football defender.
