= Kostas Frantzeskos =

Greek footballer

Personal information
- Full name: Konstantinos Frantzeskos
- Date of birth: 4 January 1969 (age 57)
- Place of birth: Athens, Greece
- Position: Midfielder

Team information
- Current team: Pannaxiakos (manager)

Youth career
- 1985–1990: AO Vouliagmeni

Senior career*
Years	Team	Apps	(Gls)
1990–1994	Panathinaikos	98	(26)
1994–1997	OFI	73	(31)
1997–2000	PAOK	107	(45)
2000–2001	Kalamata	27	(8)
2001–2002	Ionikos	12	(2)
2002–2003	AEK Larnaca	21	(14)
2003–2004	Aris	15	(1)
2004–2005	Proodeftiki	26	(5)
Total		379	(132)

International career
1992–2000	Greece	38	(7)

Managerial career
- 2017–2018: Panathinaikos U19
- 2018–2020: Panathinaikos U17
- 2020–2021: Panathinaikos U19
- 2021: Apollon Larissa
- 2021: AEL
- 2022: Karaiskakis
- 2022: Egaleo
- 2022–2023: Trikala
- 2023–2024: Atsalenios
- 2025: Alexandroupoli
- 2025: Panegialios
- 2025: Chania (technical director)
- 2025–2026: Apollon Kalythies
- 2026: Episkopi
- 2026–: Pannaxiakos
- * Club domestic league appearances and goals

Kostas Frantzeskos (Greek: Κώστας Φραντζέσκος, born 4 January 1969) is a Greek professional football manager and former player.

Frantzeskos is better known for his deadly free-kick accuracy. He scored 57 free kick goals during his career.

== Career ==
As a youngster, Kostas played for Vouliagmeni. He started his Football A Division career in Panathinaikos, after they picked him up in 1990. He was very quick to adapt and soon made his 1st division debut, in a very successful season, with Panathinaikos winning the double. He made nearly 100 appearances for the Greens - including 11 European games - winning one championship and three cups.

In 1994, he was transferred to OFI and spent two seasons there, under coach Eugène Gerards, which he still holds to the highest esteem. He appeared in many games, becoming a mainstay in the Cretan team's midfield.

At the second half of 1996/97 season, Frantzeskos left OFI for PAOK. He was one of the many Greek star-players bought at that time by then-PAOK owner Giorgos Batatoudis, along with Zisis Vryzas, Vasilios Borbokis, Spyros Marangos, and others. He was much loved by PAOK fans for his many memorable goals, especially his winner against Arsenal in the first round first leg of the 1997/98 UEFA Cup, in Toumba Stadium. PAOK went on to win the tie 2–1 on aggregate. He made over 100 appearances with PAOK during his 3-year stay, scoring 45 goals. He also made 12 appearances in the UEFA Cup, scoring 6 times. His standout performances helped him develop a good reputation in Europe especially after having some very good European match performances with PAOK.

After turning 31, Kostas left PAOK in 2000 for Kalamata, a much smaller club, then struggling for survival in the 1st Division. His tenure there was rather short, and although making a handful of appearances, he could not help the club stay in the first division. He left the next year for Ionikos, another mid-range club, also battling to avoid relegation. Managing even less appearances than the previous year, Frantzeskos decided to try out the Cypriot League, signing for AEK Larnaca, where he regained some of his former glory. That was not the case, however, when he returned to Greece in 2003, playing half a season for Aris Thessaloniki F.C. and another half for Proodeftiki. In 2003–2004 Aris narrowly escaped relegation, yet Proodeftiki was not equally lucky - so Frantzeskos finished his 15-year-long career in relative obscurity, playing a season in the Second Division until 2005.

== Style of play ==
Frantzeskos holds the record in Greece for the most goals ever scored from direct free-kicks, always using his left foot. He was frequently cited as one of the most accurate free-kick takers in Europe, especially while playing for PAOK. He even scored a few of them in the UEFA Cup, most notably the two against Atlético Madrid, much to keeper José Francisco Molina's anguish, both home and away. He continued scoring from spot-kicks on to his last days, scoring a few for Proodeftiki. He also holds a rather unusual record of being the only player in Greece to score a hat trick with free-kicks and one of only four in the world (the others are Giuseppe Signori, Siniša Mihajlović and Ray McKinnon), in the last game of the 1996–1997 season, with PAOK playing against Kastoria FC. Quite surprisingly, Frantzeskos was very inefficient at scoring from the penalty spot - which led to his famous quote during an interview: "Next time we win a penalty, and they want me to take it, I'll ask for a wall".

== National team ==
Frantzeskos debuted for the national team in 1992, in a friendly match against Cyprus, held in Kaftanzoglio Stadium, with Cyprus winning 2–3. He was an important member of the squad that qualified to the 1994 World Cup. He ended his national years in 2000, again in a friendly match, this time against Austria, held in Kalamata. He has been capped a total of 38 times for Greece, scoring 7 goals.

== Managerial statistics ==
Team	From	To	Record					Ref.
Team	From	To	G	W	D	L	Win %	Ref.
(Greece) Apollon Larissa	8 February 2021	30 June 2021	21	6	6	9	28.57	
(Greece) AEL	1 July 2021	13 October 2021	2	2	0	0	100.00	
(Greece) Karaiskakis	3 February 2022	9 April 2022	12	2	4	6	16.67	
(Greece) Egaleo	25 August 2022	27 September 2022	0	0	0	0	–	
(Greece) Trikala	12 December 2022	25 January 2023	5	1	2	2	20.00	
(Greece) Atsalenios	11 July 2023	11 November 2024	42	17	8	17	40.48	
(Greece) Alexandroupoli	8 January 2025	13 February 2025	6	1	2	3	16.67	
(Greece) Panegialios	19 February 2025	30 June 2025	9	3	1	5	33.33	
(Greece) Apollon Kalythies	23 December 2025	30 June 2026	12	5	3	4	41.67	
(Greece) Episkopi	13 July 2026	14 September 2026	1	0	0	1	0.00	
Total			110	37	26	47	33.64	

== Honours ==
Panathinaikos

- Alpha Ethniki: 1990–91
- Greek Cup: 1990–91, 1992–93, 1993–94
- Greek Super Cup: 1993

=== Individual ===
- Greek footballer with most free kick goals: 57
- Most free kick goals in Greek League: 43
- PAOK MVP of the Season: 1997–1998, 1998–1999, 1999–2000
