= Józef Wandzik =

Polish footballer

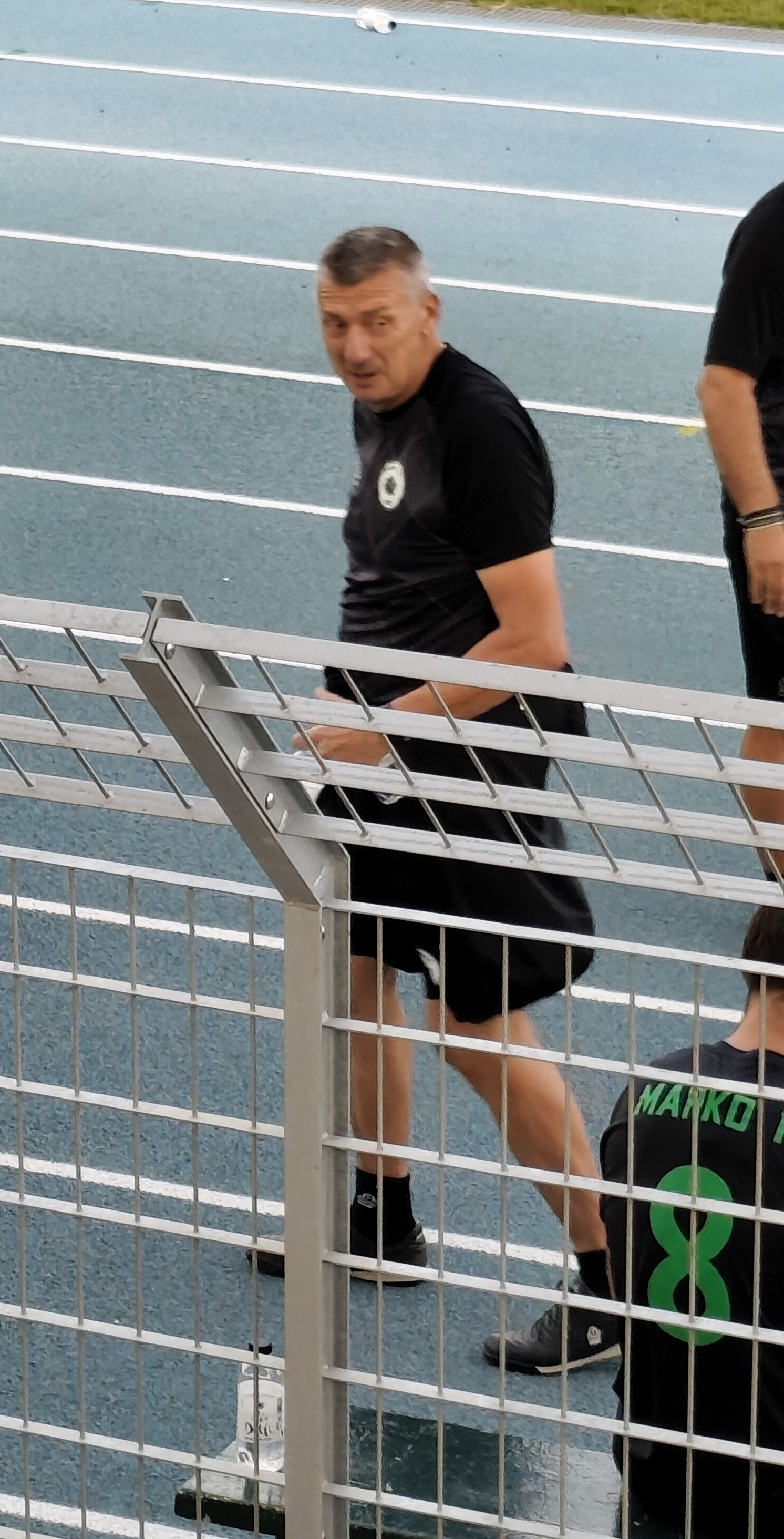
- Former Polish International and Panathinaikos FC goalkeeper Józef Wandzik taken during the Marko 1927 F.C. friendly match vs AO Karystos F.C.

Personal information
- Full name: Józef Wandzik
- Date of birth: 13 August 1963 (age 63)
- Place of birth: Tarnowskie Góry, Poland
- Height: 1.91 m (6 ft 3 in)
- Position: Goalkeeper

Team information
- Current team: Marko (Goalkeeper coach)

Youth career
- Rodło Górniki

Senior career*
Years	Team	Apps	(Gls)
1982–1984	Ruch Chorzów	56	(0)
1984–1990	Górnik Zabrze	140	(0)
1990–1999	Panathinaikos	249	(0)
1999–2000	Apollon Smyrnis	25	(0)
2000–2001	Athinaikos	6	(0)
Total		476	(0)

International career
- Poland U18
- Poland U20
1985–1995	Poland	52	(0)

Managerial career
- 2002: Kallithea (caretaker)
- 2019–2020: Marko (caretaker)
- 2022–: Marko (Goalkeeper coach)
Medal record
Men's football
Representing Poland
FIFA World Youth Championship
Third place	1983 Mexico
UEFA European Under-18 Championship
Runner-up	1981 West Germany
- * Club domestic league appearances and goals

Józef Wandzik (born 13 August 1963) is a Polish former professional footballer who played as a goalkeeper.

== Club career ==
Born in Tarnowskie Góry, Wandzik began his career at Rodlo Gorniki, before moving to Ruch Chorzów. After a couple of years playing there, he was transferred to rival club Górnik Zabrze. With Górnik Zabrze, he went on to win the Polish League in 1985-1988 and came third in 1989. His reliability earned him a transfer to Greek club Panathinaikos in the summer of 1990. With Panathinaikos, he achieved much success, reaching the semi-final of the UEFA Champions League in 1995, losing only to Ajax in the second game. He also went ahead and won the Greek League in 1991, 1995 and 1996, the Greek Cup in 1991, 1993, 1994 and 1995, the Greek League and the Greek Supercup in 1993 and 1995. At the same time, Wandzik was unbeaten for 906 and 988 minutes, setting the third and fourth records in Greece. His performances have been memorable to the fans and he has earned the nickname of "Vouno" (translation "mountain"), a nickname he has earned throughout the years for his tremendous presence in the goal.

After almost a decade at Panathinaikos, he had season-long stints at Apollon Smyrnis and Athinaikos, before ending his career in 2001. He was awarded by the Greek Football Federation a Lifetime Achievement Award for his dedication and service to Greek Football. He has been considered by many as the greatest foreign goalkeeper of all times in Greece.

== International career ==
Wandzik started his international career in the Poland national under-18 team with which he reached the finals of the 1981 World Cup. He then went to achieve third place at the Under-20 World Cup with Poland. He moved to the first national team in December 1985 and was the number one pick for the next decade. He won 52 caps for the Poland national team, the first coming on 9 December 1985 against Tunisia, and the last on 25 April 1995 against Israel. He has set the record for the Poland national team for no lost goals in 25 games, beating the record set by the legendary Jan Tomaszewski. Despite his prowess, he only represented Poland at one major tournament, the 1986 FIFA World Cup where he was third-choice behind Józef Młynarczyk and Jacek Kazimierski, and was unable to lead Poland to another tournament since.

== Managerial career ==
After his retirement in 2001, Wandzik worked as a goalkeeping coach for Kallithea F.C. but has moved to being a coach for younger talents in different academies.

== Career statistics ==
=== International ===
Appearances, conceded goals and clean sheets by national team
National team	Year	Apps	Conceded Goals	Clean Sheets
Poland	1985	2	2	0
Poland	1986	2	2	1
Poland	1987	8	11	4
Poland	1988	7	8	2
Poland	1989	5	5	3
Poland	1990	14	10	8
Poland	1991	6	6	3
Poland	1992	3	2	2
Poland	1993	0	0	0
Poland	1994	3	2	2
Poland	1995	2	5	0
Total		52	53	25

== Honours ==
Górnik Zabrze

- Ekstraklasa: 1984–85, 1985–86, 1986–87, 1987–88
- Polish Super Cup: 1988

Panathinaikos

- Super League Greece: 1990–91, 1994–95, 1995–96
- Greek Cup: 1990–91, 1992–93, 1993–94, 1994–95
- Greek Super Cup: 1988, 1993

Poland U20

- FIFA World Youth Championship third place: 1983

Poland U18

- UEFA European Under-18 Championship runner-up: 1981
