= 1990–91 Alpha Ethniki =

55th season of top-tier football league in Greece

Alpha Ethniki
- Season: 1990–91
- Champions: Panathinaikos; 16th Greek title
- Relegated: Ionikos; Levadiakos; PAS Giannina
- European Cup: Panathinaikos
- UEFA Cup: AEK Athens; PAOK
- Cup Winners' Cup: Athinaikos
- Matches: 306
- Goals: 772 (2.52 per match)
- Top goalscorer: Dimitris Saravakos (23 goals)

The 1990–91 Alpha Ethniki was the 55th season of the highest football league of Greece. The season began on 16 September 1990 and ended on 2 June 1991. Panathinaikos won their second consecutive and 16th Greek title.

The point system was: Win: 2 points - Draw: 1 point.

== Teams ==
Promoted from 1989–90 Beta Ethniki	Relegated from 1989–90 Alpha Ethniki
Athinaikos; Panachaiki; PAS Giannina	Apollon Kalamarias; Olympiacos Volos; Ethnikos Piraeus

=== Stadiums and personnel ===
Location of teams in 1990–91 Alpha Ethniki

Team	Manager^{1}	Location	Stadium
AEK Athens	(Socialist Federal Republic of Yugoslavia) Dušan Bajević	Athens (Nea Filadelfeia)	Nikos Goumas Stadium
AEL	(Bulgaria) Hristo Bonev	Larissa	Alcazar Stadium
Apollon Athens	(Greece) Konstantinos Vrettos	Athens (Rizoupoli)	Rizoupoli Stadium
Aris	(Greece) Konstantinos Tsilios	Thessaloniki (Charilaou)	Kleanthis Vikelidis Stadium
Athinaikos	(Germany) Gerhard Prokop	Athens (Vyronas)	Vyronas National Stadium
Doxa Drama	(Greece) Christos Archontidis	Drama	Doxa Drama Stadium
Ionikos	(Greece) Giannis Aivatiadis	Piraeus (Nikaia)	Neapoli Stadium
Iraklis	(Greece) Aristotelis Batakis	Thessaloniki (Triandria)	Kaftanzoglio Stadium
Levadiakos	(Greece) Alketas Panagoulias	Livadeia	Levadia Municipal Stadium
OFI	(Netherlands) Eugène Gerards	Heraklion	Theodoros Vardinogiannis Stadium
Olympiacos	(Soviet Union) Oleg Blokhin	Piraeus (Neo Faliro)	Karaiskakis Stadium
Panachaiki	(Greece) Andreas Michalopoulos	Patras	Kostas Davourlis Stadium
Panathinaikos	(Greece) Vasilios Daniil	Athens (Marousi)	Athens Olympic Stadium
Panionios	(Socialist Federal Republic of Yugoslavia) Momčilo Vukotić	Athens (Nea Smyrni)	Nea Smyrni Stadium
Panserraikos	(Greece) Nikos Alefantos	Serres	Serres Municipal Stadium
PAOK	(Greece) Christos Terzanidis	Thessaloniki (Toumba)	Toumba Stadium
PAS Giannina	(Czechoslovakia) Petr Packert	Ioannina	Zosimades Stadium
Xanthi	(Greece) Giannis Gounaris	Xanthi	Xanthi Ground

- ^{1} On final match day of the season, played on 2 June 1991.

== League table ==
Pos	Team	Pld	W	D	L	GF	GA	GD	Pts	Qualification or relegation
1	Panathinaikos (C)	34	23	8	3	77	22	+55	54	Qualification for European Cup first round
2	Olympiacos (Note: Olympiacos were deducted 2 points.)	34	19	10	5	77	28	+49	46	One-year ban from European competitions (Note: Olympiacos were punished with a one-year ban from all European competitions by the UEFA disciplinary committee after being charged for the eventful European Cup Winners' Cup match against Sampdoria on 24 October 1990.)
3	AEK Athens	34	18	6	10	59	33	+26	42	Qualification for UEFA Cup first round
4	PAOK (Note: PAOK were deducted 3 points.)	34	16	9	9	56	39	+17	38	Qualification for UEFA Cup first round
5	Iraklis	34	14	9	11	40	36	+4	37	
6	Athinaikos	34	16	5	13	40	33	+7	37	Qualification for Cup Winners' Cup first round
7	Doxa Drama	34	14	6	14	42	45	−3	34	
8	OFI	34	11	12	11	37	38	−1	34	
9	Aris	34	11	11	12	34	38	−4	33	
10	Panionios	34	9	12	13	38	54	−16	30	
11	Apollon Athens	34	10	10	14	41	62	−21	30	
12	AEL	34	10	9	15	38	46	−8	29	
13	Panachaiki	34	9	10	15	36	48	−12	28	
14	Panserraikos	34	9	10	15	30	42	−12	28	
15	Xanthi	34	9	10	15	35	53	−18	28	
16	Ionikos (R)	34	9	9	16	37	50	−13	27	Relegation to Beta Ethniki
17	Levadiakos (R)	34	10	7	17	35	51	−16	27	Relegation to Beta Ethniki
18	PAS Giannina (R)	34	8	9	17	20	54	−34	25	Relegation to Beta Ethniki

Source: RSSSF
Rules for classification: 1st points; 2nd head-to-head points; 3rd head-to-head goal difference; 4th decision match.
(C) Champions; (R) Relegated

== Results ==
Home \ Away	AEK	AEL	APA	ARIS	ATH	DOX	ION	IRA	LEV	OFI	OLY	PNA	PAO	PGSS	PNS	PAOK	PAS	XAN
AEK Athens		5–2	1–1	4–1	0–0	3–0	2–0	4–0	3–1	3–1	1–0 (Note: AEK Athens-Olympiacos 1–2, replayed 1–0 because of heavy smoke at 84th minute.)	3–2	1–2	1–0	1–0	0–0	0–1	6–0
AEL	1–2		0–1	0–1	2–0	2–1	0–0	0–1	2–1	2–0	1–1	1–0	1–2	1–1	4–2	1–1	3–0	1–0
Apollon Athens	2–5	1–1		1–1	2–1	1–0	1–0	0–1	3–0	3–1	1–1	1–0	1–4	2–2	0–1	4–2	1–1	2–1
Aris	2–1	1–0	3–1		1–2	1–0	2–1	0–0	1–1	1–1	1–1	2–0	1–0	2–0	0–1	0–1	3–0	0–0
Athinaikos	1–0	1–1	3–2	2–1		6–2	2–0	1–0	1–0	1–0	0–1	2–0	0–0	0–0	2–2	0–5	1–2	2–0
Doxa Drama	2–0	2–0	3–0	1–3	1–0		4–1	1–1	3–1	1–1	3–2	0–0	0–1	2–0	2–0	1–0	3–0	1–0
Ionikos	1–1	3–0	1–1	0–0	2–1	1–0		1–2	1–0	0–2	2–2	1–0	1–1	2–0	2–0	3–2	2–0	1–1
Iraklis	0–1	2–1	5–2	1–0	2–0	2–2	1–0		3–2	2–0	0–2	1–0	0–2	4–3	1–1	0–0	4–0	0–0
Levadiakos	0–3	0–2	1–0	4–1	1–0	1–1	2–2	1–0		1–1	0–1	2–0	0–0	2–1	2–1	2–2	1–0	2–0
OFI	1–0	2–0	3–0	1–0	0–1	0–2	5–3	4–1	2–1		0–0	1–1	1–3	1–0	0–0	0–0	1–1	1–0
Olympiacos	3–1	2–0	7–1	5–1	0–2 (Note: Olympiacos-Athinaikos 2–2, awarded with 0–2 because of pitch invasion of Olympiacos fans at 88th minute.)	4–0	2–1	0–0	3–0	1–1		6–0	0–0	4–1	3–1	3–2	3–0	8–1
Panachaiki	0–2	2–0	1–3	2–2	0–3	2–1	2–0	3–2	1–1	0–0	0–1		3–2	0–0	3–0	3–2	4–1	5–1
Panathinaikos	4–0	3–3	5–0	3–0	2–1	3–0	2–0	1–0	4–0	3–0	0–1	0–0		6–1	2–0	3–0 (Note: Panathinaikos-PAOK 3–0, suspended at 77th minute, because the whole team of PAOK left the pitch. Original 3-0 result stood.)	3–0	6–2
Panionios	0–3	0–0	1–0	0–0	2–0	2–1	3–2	1–3	2–1	2–2	1–6	1–1	1–1		2–1	2–0	4–1	1–1
Panserraikos	1–0	0–0	0–0	1–0	0–2	4–0	2–2	0–0	1–0	2–3	2–2	0–0	1–3	1–2		2–1	1–0	2–1
PAOK	1–1	2–1	3–0	2–1	1–0	1–1	4–1	2–1	2–3	0–0	3–2	4–1	1–1	1–0	1–0		4–1	2–0
PAS Giannina	1–1	0–3	2–2	0–0	1–0	0–1	1–0	1–0	2–1	1–0	0–0	0–0	1–2	1–1	1–0	0–2		0–0
Xanthi	2–0	6–2	1–1	1–1	0–2	2–0	2–0	0–0	2–0	2–1	1–0	2–0	1–3	1–1	0–0	1–2	3–0	

Source: RSSSF
Legend: Blue = home team win; Yellow = draw; Red = away team win.

== Top scorers ==
Rank	Player	Club	Goals
1	(Greece) Dimitris Saravakos	Panathinaikos	23
2	(Poland) Krzysztof Warzycha	Panathinaikos	18
3	(Greece) Nikos Anastopoulos	Olympiacos	16
4	(Greece) Georgios Vaitsis	Panachaiki	15
5	(Cape Verde) Daniel Batista	AEK Athens	13
6	(Greece) Georgios Skartados	PAOK	12
7	(Greece) Aris Karasavvidis	Apollon Athens	11
7	(Soviet Union) Oleh Protasov	Olympiacos	11
9	(Greece) Vangelis Kalogeropoulos	Ionikos	10
9	(Greece) Stathis Pechlivanidis	Levadiakos	10
9	(Soviet Union) Yuri Savichev	Olympiacos	10

== Attendances ==
Olympiacos drew the highest average home attendance in the 1990–91 Alpha Ethniki.

#	Team	Average attendance
1	Olympiacos	18,363
2	Panathinaikos	18,133
3	AEK Athens	10,306
4	PAOK	8,388
5	AEL	7,377
6	OFI	5,794
7	Xanthi	5,327
8	Aris	5,245
9	PAS Giannina	5,024
10	Panachaiki	4,201
11	Iraklis	4,001
12	Panserraikos	3,705
13	Ionikos	3,597
14	Athinaikos	3,453
15	Apollon Athens	3,374
16	Panionios	3,344
17	Doxa Drama	2,586
18	Levadiakos	2,438
