= Giannis Kalitzakis =

Greek footballer

Personal information
- Full name: Ioannis Kalitzakis
- Date of birth: 10 February 1966 (age 60)
- Place of birth: Eleusis, Greece
- Height: 1.88 m (6 ft 2 in)
- Position: Centre-back

Senior career*
Years	Team	Apps	(Gls)
1983–1987	Panelefsiniakos	106	(3)
1987	Diagoras	18	(1)
1987–1997	Panathinaikos	260	(15)
1997–2000	AEK Athens	76	(1)
2000–2001	Ethnikos Asteras	23	(0)
Total		483	(20)

International career
1987–1998	Greece	71	(0)
- * Club domestic league appearances and goals

Giannis Kalitzakis (Greek: Γιάννης Καλιτζάκης; born 10 February 1966) is a Greek former professional footballer who played as a centre-back. His nickname was "The Ninja" due to his hard acrobatic tackles and very strong defensive style.

== Club career ==
Kalitzakis started his career in Panelefsiniakos, where he played for three and a half seasons and after playing for another half season at Diagoras he signed for Panathinaikos. In the "greens" he quickly established himself as a key player and irreplaceable, he became especially loved by the world and did a lot important career for a whole decade, being also captain of the team, winning 4 championships, 6 Greek Cups and 3 Super cups, including 3 doubles. He participated in important European matchs of the club, including their course to the semi-finals of the UEFA Champions League in 1996.

In the summer of 1997, Kalitzakis was transferred to the city rivals, AEK Athens for a fee of 23.8 million drachmas. There, he had a pretty good presence for three years with many different partners by his side, without losing his place in the lineup. Nevertheless, he did not reach the level of performance that he displayed during his spell at Panathinaikos. During his three seasons at AEK, Kalitzakis won the Cup in 2000. In the summer of 2000 following the decision of the manager, Giannis Pathiakakis his contract was not renewed and left the club. Afterwards Kalitzakis signed for Ethnikos Asteras, where he played for one season before ending his career.

== International career ==
Kalitzakis played for Greece from 16 December 1987 to 1999. He had 71 caps in total, including three appearances at the 1994 FIFA World Cup.

== After football ==
After the end of his career, Kalitzakis served as the head of Panelefsiniakos' academies and general captain of Paniliakos. In 2009 he returned to Panathinaikos as a member of the scouting department, a position he held for a year. In 2022 he became General manager of Panathinaikos B

== Honours ==
Panathinaikos

- Alpha Ethniki: 1989–90, 1990–91, 1994–95, 1995–96
- Greek Cup: 1987–88, 1988–89, 1990–91, 1992–93, 1993–94, 1994–95
- Greek Super Cup: 1988, 1993, 1994

AEK Athens

- Greek Cup: 1999–2000
