= Vasilios Daniil =

Greek football manager (1938–2026)

Vasilis Daniil
Personal information
- Full name: Vasilios Daniil
- Date of birth: 3 August 1938
- Place of birth: Kavala, Greece
- Date of death: 4 March 2026 (aged 87)
- Place of death: Kavala, Greece

Managerial career
- Years: Team
- 1979–1982: Kavala
- 1982–1983: Kastoria
- 1984–1986: Apollon Kalamarias
- 1986–1988: Panathinaikos
- 1988–1990: Olympiacos Volos
- 1990–1992: Panathinaikos
- 1992: Apollon Kalamarias
- 1992–1993: Skoda Xanthi
- 1994–1995: AEL
- 1995: Skoda Xanthi
- 1996–1997: Paniliakos
- 1997–1999: Panathinaikos
- 1999–2001: Greece
- 2012: Skoda Xanthi

Vasilios Daniil (Greek: Βασίλειος Δανιήλ; 3 August 1938 – 4 March 2026) was a Greek professional football manager.

Daniil managed Kavala, Kastoria, Apollon Kalamarias, Panathinaikos, Olympiacos Volos, Skoda Xanthi, Paniliakos and Greece.

== Managerial career ==
As coach of Panathinaikos (in three different spells), he led the team to UEFA Cup quarter finals in 1987–1988 and he won the double in 1991.

Daniil served as head coach of Greece from 1999 to 2001. He made his official debut as the coach of Greece on 31 March 1999 in an away match against Latvia (0–0), for the Euro 2000 qualifiers. During his time coaching the national team, Daniil had 14 wins, 8 losses and 8 draws. He faced difficulties in staffing the team, as during that period three AEK players, Demis Nikolaidis, Michalis Kasapis and Ilias Atmatsidis, whom Daniil was considering as starters, abstained from the national team as a protest against the refereeing in the Greek league.

== Death ==
On 4 March 2026, it was announced that he had died in Kavala, at the age of 87.

== Honours ==
Panathinaikos

- Alpha Ethniki: 1990–91
- Greek Cup: 1990–91
