= Krzysztof Warzycha =

Polish footballer

Personal information
- Date of birth: 17 November 1964 (age 61)
- Place of birth: Katowice, Poland
- Height: 1.74 m (5 ft 9 in)
- Position: Forward

Team information
- Current team: PAS Preveza (manager)

Senior career*
Years	Team	Apps	(Gls)
1983–1989	Ruch Chorzów	192	(79)
1989–2004	Panathinaikos	390	(244)
Total		582	(323)

International career
1984–1997	Poland	50	(9)

Managerial career
- 2012: Egaleo
- 2012: Fokikos
- 2013–2014: Kallithea
- 2014–2015: Fostiras
- 2017: Ruch Chorzów
- 2018: Sparta
- 2020–2021: Enosis Aspropyrgos
- 2025–2026: A.E. Kifisia U19
- 2026–: PAS Preveza
- * Club domestic league appearances and goals

Krzysztof Ireneusz Warzycha (Polish: [ˈkʂɨʂtɔv vaˈʐɨxa], Greek: Κριστόφ Βαζέχα; born 17 November 1964) is a Polish former professional footballer who played as a forward for Ruch Chorzów and for Greek club Panathinaikos. During his 15 seasons with Panathinaikos, he scored 319 goals in 553 official appearances and remains the club's all-time leading goalscorer. At international level, he played for the Poland national team, scoring nine goals in 50 appearances. In 1988, he won the Polish Footballer of the Year Award presented by the Piłka Nożna football weekly.

== Club career ==
=== Ruch Chorzów ===
Warzycha played for Polish team Ruch Chorzów, won the Polish Championship in 1989 and was the top scorer in the Polish premier league the same year.

=== Panathinaikos ===
Warzycha joined Panathinaikos in December 1989, and won five Greek championships (1990, 1991, 1995, 1996, 2004), five Greek cups (1991, 1993, 1994, 1995, 2004), two Greek super cups 1993, 1994, while he was the highest scorer of the Greek championship 3 times (1994, 1995, 1998).

He is Panathinaikos' all-time leading goalscorer and an idol for the club. Warzycha is considered by many to be one of the best foreign players who have played in Greece. He was one of two Poles in the title-winning side of 1995, with fellow countryman Józef Wandzik keeping over a dozen clean sheets (shutouts) during the season.

He is Panathinaikos' all-time leading goalscorer, with 319 goals in 553 official appearances: 244 goals in 390 league matches, 50 in 100 Greek Cup matches and 25 in 63 European matches.

==== The most iconic goal ====
On 3 April 1996, Warzycha scored probably the most important goal of his career (according to a late interview), against Ajax Amsterdam in 1995–96 UEFA Champions League Semi-Finals in Amsterdam Olympic Stadium and gave Ajax their first home defeat in four years, in their last home match before the demolition of the stadium. The 1–0 victory ended Ajax's 18-match unbeaten run in European competition.

==== First goal scorer ====
At the end of the 2000–01 season, Warzycha had scored an incredible 235 goals in 352 matches and had been the Greek Alpha Ethniki premier league's top scorer in three different years in the 90s (1994, 1995 and 1998 seasons). His appearances in the UEFA Champions League have been no less impressive – he scored six goals in Panathinaikos' nine games on the way to the semi-finals of the 1995–96 competition.

With eight goals scored in all UEFA Champions League games, Warzycha remained the best scorer of Polish nationality in this competition until the 2012–13 season, when Robert Lewandowski scored 10 times for Dortmund in Dortmund's surprise run to the Champions League final.

On 29 April 2001, during a match against Ionikos FC, Warzycha scored the 233rd goal of his career in Greece, climbing to second place on the list of all-time goal scorers, tied with Mimis Papaioannou. Warzycha later scored his 234th goal and become sole occupant of this spot.

He was granted Greek citizenship in 1998. He retired in 2004.

== Managerial career ==
After Panathinaikos head coach Henk Ten Cate was let go on 8 December 2009, Warzycha was appointed as assistant coach alongside Nikos Nioplias.

On 1 March 2012, Warzycha was appointed as the head coach of Delta Ethniki side Egaleo, with this being his first venture into management.

In 2012, Warzycha was the head coach of Fokikos.

In April 2017, he was appointed manager of Ruch Chorzów, replacing Waldemar Fornalik.

In June 2025, Warzycha was appointed head coach of the under-19 team of A.E. Kifisia F.C.. His tenure ended in January 2026. In May 2026, he was appointed manager of Preveza F.C. for the club's return to the Gamma Ethniki. The Hellenic Football Federation identified him as Preveza's coach in July 2026.

== International career ==
Warzycha played 50 times for Poland, scoring nine goals. He played his last game for the Poland national team in April 1997 against Italy in Napoli, in a 3–0 loss.

== Later life ==
Warzycha ran in the Greek local elections, 2014 with a New Democracy backed combination for the municipality of Athens. He was also an ANEL candidate to parliament in January 2015 legislative elections, but without success.

== Career statistics ==
=== Club ===
Appearances and goals by club, season and competition
Club	Season	League			Greek Cup		Europe		Other		Total	
Club	Season	Division	Apps	Goals	Apps	Goals	Apps	Goals	Apps	Goals	Apps	Goals
Panathinaikos	1989–90	Alpha Ethniki	21	14	0	0	2	1	—		23	15
Panathinaikos	1990–91	Alpha Ethniki	31	18	0	0	4	0	—		35	18
Panathinaikos	1991–92	Alpha Ethniki	21	12	0	0	4	0	—		25	12
Panathinaikos	1992–93	Alpha Ethniki	33	32	0	0	4	4	—		37	36
Panathinaikos	1993–94	Alpha Ethniki	31	24	0	0	4	2	1	0	36	26
Panathinaikos	1994–95	Alpha Ethniki	33	29	0	0	4	3	1	0	38	32
Panathinaikos	1995–96	Alpha Ethniki	32	19	0	0	11	6	—		43	25
Panathinaikos	1996–97	Alpha Ethniki	34	21	4	1	4	1	—		42	23
Panathinaikos	1997–98	Alpha Ethniki	34	32	7	3	—		—		41	35
Panathinaikos	1998–99	Alpha Ethniki	25	12	5	5	6	2	—		36	19
Panathinaikos	1999–00	Alpha Ethniki	30	9	4	0	3	1	—		37	10
Panathinaikos	2000–01	Alpha Ethniki	27	13	8	3	13	3	—		48	19
Panathinaikos	2001–02	Alpha Ethniki	12	6	8	3	2	0	—		22	9
Panathinaikos	2002–03	Alpha Ethniki	21	3	7	2	6	3	—		34	8
Panathinaikos	2003–04	Alpha Ethniki	5	0	4	0	0	0	—		9	0
Panathinaikos Total			390	244	47	17	63	25	2	0	502	286

=== International ===
Appearances and goals by national team and year
National team	Year	Apps	Goals
Poland	1984	2	0
Poland	1985	0	0
Poland	1986	0	0
Poland	1987	4	0
Poland	1988	6	1
Poland	1989	13	3
Poland	1990	6	0
Poland	1991	3	0
Poland	1992	3	2
Poland	1993	3	1
Poland	1994	2	0
Poland	1995	1	0
Poland	1996	4	2
Poland	1997	3	0
Total		50	9

Scores and results list Poland's goal tally first, score column indicates score after each Warzycha goal.

List of international goals scored by Krzysztof Warzycha
No.	Date	Venue	Opponent	Score	Result	Competition
1	19 October 1988	Silesian Stadium, Chorzów, Poland	Albania	1–0	1–0	1990 FIFA World Cup qualification
2	7 February 1989	Estadio Nacional de Costa Rica, San José, Costa Rica	Costa Rica	1–0	4–2	Friendly
3	7 February 1989	Estadio Nacional de Costa Rica, San José, Costa Rica	Costa Rica	3–0	4–2	Friendly
4	12 February 1989	Estadio Mateo Flores, Guatemala City, Guatemala	Guatemala	1–0	1–0	Friendly
5	19 May 1992	Stadion Lehen, Salzburg, Austria	Austria	3–1	4–2	Friendly
6	27 May 1992	City Stadium, Jastrzębie-Zdrój, Poland	Czechoslovakia	1–0	1–0	Friendly
7	19 May 1993	Stadio Olimpico, Serravalle, San Marino	San Marino	3–0	3–0	1994 FIFA World Cup qualification
8	27 August 1996	Stadion GKS, Bełchatów, Poland	Cyprus	1–0	2–2	Friendly
9	10 November 1996	Stadion GKS Katowice, Katowice, Poland	Moldova	2–0	2–1	1998 FIFA World Cup qualification

== Honours ==
Ruch Chorzów

- Ekstraklasa: 1988–89
- II liga, group I: 1987–88

Panathinaikos

- Alpha Ethniki: 1989–90, 1990–91, 1994–95, 1995–96, 2003–04
- Greek Cup: 1990–91, 1992–93, 1993–94, 1994–95, 2003–04
- Greek Super Cup: 1993, 1994

Individual

- Piłka Nożna Polish Footballer of the Year: 1988
- Ekstraklasa top scorer: 1988–89 (24 goals)
- Marlboro Cup top scorer: 1989 Chicago (4 goals)
- Super League Greece top scorer: 1993–94 (24 goals), 1994–95 (29 goals), 1997–98 (32 goals)
