= Yiorgos Vardinogiannis =

Greek businessman and shipping magnate (1936–2026)

- Γιώργος Βαρδινογιάννης
- Born: 26 November 1936; Episkopi, Kingdom of Greece
- Died: 16 October 2026 (aged 89); Marousi, Greece
- Education: Hellenic Naval Academy
- Occupations: Shipowner, businessman
- Years active: 1963–2026
- Office: 35th president of Panathinaikos F.C. (1979–2000)
- Predecessor: Jack Nikolaidis
- Successor: Angelos Filippidis
- Board member of: SEKA Bunkering Stations
- Spouse: Agapi Politi
- Children: Pavlos Vardinogiannis, Nikos Vardinogiannis and Princess Chrysí of Greece and Denmark
- Relatives: Vardis Vardinogiannis (brother)

Yiorgos Vardinogiannis (Greek: Γιώργος Βαρδινογιάννης; 26 November 1936 – 16 October 2026) was a Greek businessman and a shipping magnate, who was the owner and president of the Panathinaikos F.C.. He was the brother of oil and shipping tycoon Vardis Vardinogiannis, and also the father of Chrysí Vardinogiánni, wife of Prince Nikolaos of Greece and Denmark.

== Life and career ==
=== Early life and seafaring career ===
Yiorgos Vardinogiannis was born on 26 November 1936 in Episkopi, Greece. He completed his maritime studies at Southampton before embarking on a seafaring career. He managed to be promoted to the rank of captain and then along with his brothers founded the family ship and oil business.

=== Rhodesian sanction busting ===
Vardinoyannis was captain of the oil tanker MV Arietta Venezelos which in February 1966 was located in the Persian Gulf. The Greek government, reacting to concerns that oil it was taking on board was destined for Rhodesia gave instructions to the owners, Venizelos SA to divert the ship to Rotterdam rather than South Africa and forbade the delivery of oil to Rhodesia. However, Vardinogiannis continued to sail for Beira in Mozambique, then a colony of Portugal. Here the pipeline would allow oil to be pumped to landlocked Rhodesia.

=== Football ===
On 17 July 1979, Vardinogiannis family acquired the majority stake of Greek football club Panathinaikos and Yiorgos Vardinogiannis was appointed president of Panathinaikos. He served in this position for 21 years (1979–2000) and had the nicknames Kapetanios (Captain) and Ringo. The latter nickname was given to him due to his habit of carrying a gun.

During his reign as club president, Panathinaikos won six Greek championships (1983-84, 1985-86, 1989-90, 1990-91, 1994-95, 1995-96) and nine Greek cups (1981-82, 1983-84, 1985-86, 1987-88, 1988-89, 1990-91, 1992-93, 1993-94, 1994-95).

=== Death ===
Vardinogiannis died at Ygeia Hospital on 16 October 2026, at age 89.
