= 1990–91 Greek Football Cup =

1990–91 Greek Cup
Tournament details
- Country: Greece
- Teams: 72

Final positions
- Champions: Panathinaikos (12th title)
- Runners-up: Athinaikos

Tournament statistics
- Matches played: 118
- Top goal scorer(s): Dimitris Saravakos (10 goals)

The 1990–91 Greek Football Cup was the 49th edition of the Greek Football Cup.

== Tournament details ==
Totally 72 teams participated, 18 from Alpha Ethniki, 18 from Beta, and 36 from Gamma. It was held in 6 rounds, included final.

After the group stage, there were interesting confrontations and many "protagonists" were eliminated by the competition continue. In the second round, Olympiacos were eliminated by PAOK, Aris by Athinaikos and Iraklis by Xanthi, while in the third round AEK Athens were eliminated by OFI. In the same round, Edessaikos, a Beta Ethniki team, reversed their loss 4–0 by Ionikos, achieving a draw with the same score in the second leg, in order however to be eliminated in penalty shoot-out.

The final was contested by Panathinaikos, for sixth time in the last 10 years, after the qualify against PAOK in semi-finals and the newly-promoted in Alpha Ethniki, Athinaikos, for first and unique until now time in their history. That year, HFF decided the establishment of a two-legged final match, according to the model of Coppa Italia. Athinaikos selected as home of first match Leoforos Alexandras Stadium, instead of their neutral home, Municipal Stadium of Vyronas, while the second match became in the Athens Olympic Stadium. Panathinaikos won both matches and at the same time The Double.

Athinaikos, as finalist of competition, participated in the next season's European Cup Winners' Cup, for the first and only time in their history. Nikos Sarganis, the goalkeeper of Athinaikos, that had played in the first match of final, failed to win the Cup with a fourth club, after Kastoria, Olympiacos and Panathinaikos. The second match was the last for the referee, Meletis Voutsaras. For the fourth consecutive season, Dimitris Saravakos was the competition's top scorer with 10 goals.

== Calendar ==
Round	Date(s)	Fixtures	Clubs	New entries
Group stage	26, 29 August & 2 September 1990	56	72 → 32	72
Round of 32	5, 12 December 1990 & 9 January 1991	32	32 → 16	none
Round of 16	30 January, 20 February 1991	16	16 → 8	none
Quarter-finals	13, 21 March 1991	8	8 → 4	none
Semi-finals	4, 24 April 1991	4	4 → 2	none
Final	15, 22 May 1991	2	2 → 1	none

== Group stage ==
The phase was played in a single round-robin format. Each win would gain 2 points, each draw 1 and each loss would not gain any point.

=== Group 1 ===
Pos	Team	Pts
1	Panathinaikos	7
2	Apollon Kalamarias	5
3	Diagoras	5
4	Aris Nikaias	2
5	Paniliakos	1

=== Group 2 ===
Pos	Team	Pts
1	Panionios	8
2	Ethnikos Asteras	4
3	Anagennisi Kolindros	3
4	Lamia	3
5	Odysseas Kordelio	2

=== Group 3 ===
Pos	Team	Pts
1	Charavgiakos	6
2	Proodeftiki	5
3	Pierikos	4
4	Ethnikos Piraeus	4
5	PAS Giannina	1

=== Group 4 ===
Pos	Team	Pts
1	Doxa Vyronas	6
2	Aris	6
3	Olympiacos Volos	5
4	Korinthos	3
5	Aspida Xanthi	0

=== Group 5 ===
Pos	Team	Pts
1	Athinaikos	8
2	Panargiakos	6
3	Kastoria	3
4	Anagennisi Giannitsa	2
5	Atromitos	1

=== Group 6 ===
Pos	Team	Pts
1	Naoussa	7
2	Iraklis	6
3	Trikala	3
4	Acharnaikos	2
5	Niki Volos	2

=== Group 7 ===
Pos	Team	Pts
1	Anagennisi Karditsa	5
2	Ionikos	5
3	Veria	5
4	Panetolikos	3
5	Kallithea	2

=== Group 8 ===
Pos	Team	Pts
1	Olympiacos	8
2	Panelefsiniakos	4
3	Kozani	4
4	Chaidari	3
5	A.F.C. Kyriakio	1

=== Group 9 ===
Pos	Team	Pts
1	AEK Athens	6
2	Panarkadikos	3
3	AE Mesolongi	2
4	Preveza	1

=== Group 10 ===
Pos	Team	Pts
1	AEL	5
2	Eordaikos	4
3	Asteras Ambelokipoi	2
4	Pontioi Veria	1

=== Group 11 ===
Pos	Team	Pts
1	PAOK	6
2	OFI	4
3	Makedonikos	2
4	Kalamata	0

=== Group 12 ===
Pos	Team	Pts
1	Panserraikos	5
2	Edessaikos	3
3	Panachaiki	2
4	Sparta	2

=== Group 13 ===
Pos	Team	Pts
1	Apollon Athens	6
2	Ilisiakos	4
3	Neoi Epivates	2
4	Thriamvos Athens	0

=== Group 14 ===
Pos	Team	Pts
1	Xanthi	5
2	Kilkisiakos	4
3	Egaleo	2
4	Nigrita	1

=== Group 15 ===
Pos	Team	Pts
1	EAR	4
2	Doxa Drama	3
3	Kavala	3
4	Chalkidona	2

=== Group 16 ===
Pos	Team	Pts
1	Levadiakos	4
2	Olympiakos Loutraki	4
3	Irodotos	3
4	Anagennisi Neapoli	1

== Knockout phase ==
Each tie in the knockout phase, was played over two legs, with each team playing one leg at home. The team that scored more goals on aggregate over the two legs advanced to the next round. If the aggregate score was level, the away goals rule was applied, i.e. the team that scored more goals away from home over the two legs advanced. If away goals were also equal, then extra time was played. The away goals rule was again applied after extra time, i.e. if there were goals scored during extra time and the aggregate score was still level, the visiting team advanced by virtue of more away goals scored. If no goals were scored during extra time, the winners were decided by a penalty shoot-out.
The mechanism of the draws for each round is as follows:

- There are no seedings, and teams from the same group can be drawn against each other.

== Bracket ==
Round of 32
Athinaikos	2	3	5
Aris	1	1	2
Olympiakos Loutraki	2	0	2
Anagennisi Karditsa	0	3	3
Naoussa	2	1	3
Doxa Drama	4	0	4
Doxa Vyronas	0	0	0
Eordaikos	0	2	2
EAR (a)	2	1	3
Panargiakos	0	3	3
Panelefsiniakos	2	0	2
Panionios	3	5	8
Panserraikos (a)	3	0	3
OFI	1	2	3
Charavgiakos	0	0	0
AEK Athens	3	2	5
Ionikos	3	1	4
Ethnikos Asteras	0	0	0
Edessaikos	1	1	2
Apollon Kalamarias	0	0	0
Proodeftiki	1	0	1
Panathinaikos	2	5	7
Ilisiakos	1	2	3
Levadiakos	1	4	5
Iraklis	0	0	0
Xanthi	0	1	1
Olympiacos	2	0	2
PAOK	0	3	3
Panarkadikos	4	0	4
Kilkisiakos	1	5	6
AEL (a)	0	1	1
Apollon Athens	0	1	1

Round of 16
Athinaikos	3	2	5
Anagennisi Karditsa	0	1	1
Doxa Drama	3	1	4
Eordaikos	0	1	1
EAR	1	0	1
Panionios	3	3	6
OFI	3	1	4
AEK Athens	0	3	3
Ionikos (p)	4	0	4(5)
Edessaikos	0	4	4(4)
Panathinaikos	2	0	2
Levadiakos	1	0	1
Xanthi	2	0	2
PAOK	1	2	3
Kilkisiakos	3	2	5
AEL	2	4	6

Quarter-finals
Athinaikos	2	1	3
Doxa Drama	0	0	0
Panionios (p)	2	0	2(3)
OFI	0	2	2(2)
Ionikos	0	1	1
Panathinaikos	3	3	6
PAOK	3	0	3
AEL	0	2	2

Semi-finals
Athinaikos	3	1	4
Panionios	0	3	3
Panathinaikos	2	0	2
PAOK	0	1	1

Final
Athinaikos	0	1	1
Panathinaikos	3	2	5

== Round of 32 ==
Team 1	Agg.	Team 2	1st leg	2nd leg
Ilisiakos	3–5	Levadiakos	1–1	2–4
AEL	(a) 1–1	Apollon Athens	0–0	1–1 (a.e.t.)
Proodeftiki	1–7	Panathinaikos	1–2	0–5
Panarkadikos	4–6	Kilkisiakos	4–1	0–5
Edessaikos	2–0	Apollon Kalamarias	1–0	1–0
Charavgiakos	0–5	AEK Athens	0–3	0–2
Olympiacos	2–3	PAOK	2–0	0–3
Ionikos	4–0	Ethnikos Asteras	3–0	1–0
EAR	(a) 3–3	Panargiakos	2–0	1–3
Panserraikos	3–3 (a)	OFI	3–1	0–2
Athinaikos	5–2	Aris	2–1	3–1
Iraklis	0–1	Xanthi	0–0	0–1
Olympiakos Loutraki	2–3	Anagennisi Karditsa	2–0	0–3
Panelefsiniakos	2–8	Panionios	2–3	0–5
Naoussa	3–4	Doxa Drama	2–4	1–0
Doxa Vyronas	0–2	Eordaikos	0–0	0–2

== Round of 16 ==
Team 1	Agg.	Team 2	1st leg	2nd leg
Kilkisiakos	5–6	AEL	3–2	2–4
OFI	4–3	AEK Athens	3–0	1–3
Panathinaikos	2–1	Levadiakos	2–1	0–0
Xanthi	2–3	PAOK	2–1	0–2
Doxa Drama	4–1	Eordaikos	3–0	1–1
Ionikos	4–4 (5–4 p)	Edessaikos	4–0	0–4
Athinaikos	5–1	Anagennisi Karditsa	3–0	2–1
EAR	1–6	Panionios	1–3	0–3

== Quarter-finals ==
Team 1	Agg.	Team 2	1st leg	2nd leg
Panionios	2–2 (3–2 p)	OFI	2–0	0–2
Athinaikos	3–0	Doxa Drama	2–0	1–0
PAOK	3–2	AEL	3–0	0–2
Ionikos	1–6	Panathinaikos	0–3	1–3

== Semi-finals ==
Team 1	Agg.	Team 2	1st leg	2nd leg
Panathinaikos	2–1	PAOK	2–0	0–1
Athinaikos	4–3	Panionios	3–0	1–3

== Final ==
=== First leg ===
15 May 1991

Athinaikos	0–3	Panathinaikos
	Report (page 1)	Kourbanas 70'; Warzycha 78'; Vlachos 89'

Leoforos Alexandras Stadium, Ampelokipoi
Attendance: 12,737
Referee: Kostas Dimitriadis (Piraeus)

=== Second leg ===
22 May 1991

Panathinaikos	2–1	Athinaikos
Saravakos 71'; Kourbanas 84'	Report (page 1)	Zotalis 45' (pen.)

Olympic Stadium, Marousi
Attendance: 19,375
Referee: Meletis Voutsaras (Athens)

Panathinaikos won 5–1 on aggregate.
