= Stratos Apostolakis =

Greek footballer (born 1964)

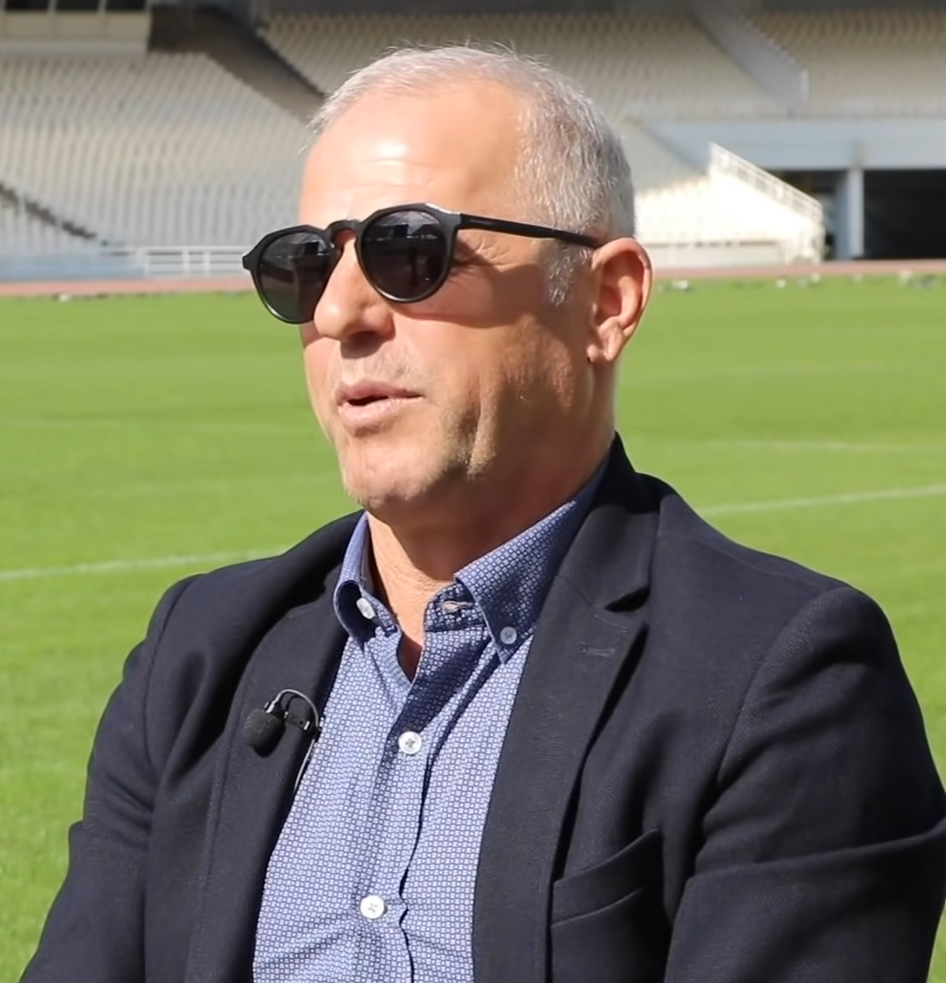
- Apostolakis in 2020

Personal information
- Full name: Efstratios Apostolakis
- Date of birth: 17 May 1964 (age 62)
- Place of birth: Agrinio, Greece
- Height: 1.72 m (5 ft 8 in)
- Positions: Defender; defensive midfielder

Senior career*
Years	Team	Apps	(Gls)
1981–1985	Panetolikos	106	(11)
1985–1990	Olympiacos	132	(5)
1990–1999	Panathinaikos	249	(21)
Total		481	(37)

International career
1986–1998	Greece	96	(5)

Managerial career
- 2001: Panathinaikos (interim)
- 2004: Greece U23
- * Club domestic league appearances and goals

Stratos Apostolakis (Greek: Στράτος Αποστολάκης; born 17 May 1964), nicknamed The Turbo, is a Greek former professional footballer who played as a defender or a defensive midfielder.

== Career ==
Apostolakis was no stranger to controversy as a player, his switch from Olympiacos to Panathinaikos in 1990 led to the cancellation of the Greek Super Cup as the authorities feared riots.

As a footballer he played his best years for Panathinaikos being one of the key players behind club's European runs in 1991–92 and 1995–96. He played with Panathinaikos through 1998.

During his playing career, Apostolakis was capped 96 times by the Greece national team scoring five goals. and was a member of the 1994 World Cup squad. His 96 caps stood as a Greek record until it was broken by Theodoros Zagorakis.

He also spent six months as a coach with Panathinaikos in 2001, before resigning from his position at the end of the year and eventually taking up the task of coaching the Olympic team for Athens 2004.

== Personal life ==
Apostolakis is the father of Kostas, who plays as a professional footballer at AEL.
