= Nikos Kourbanas =

Greek footballer

Personal information
- Date of birth: 22 March 1962 (age 64)
- Place of birth: Velo, Greece
- Height: 1.86 m (6 ft 1 in)
- Position: Defender

Team information
- Current team: Korinthos (manager)

Senior career*
Years	Team	Apps	(Gls)
1985–1987	Korinthos		
1987–1988	Panachaiki		
1988–1992	Panathinaikos		
1993–1996	Panionios		
1996–1997	Marko		

International career
1988–1991	Greece	8	(0)

Managerial career
- 1996–1998: Marko
- 1998–1999: Aiolikos
- 1999–2000: Doxa Vyronas
- 2000–2001: Marko
- 2001: Panachaiki
- 2001–2002: Kallithea
- 2002: Fostiras
- 2003: Kerkyra
- 2003–2004: Niki Volos
- 2004–2005: Panachaiki
- 2005: Olympiacos Volos
- 2006: Niki Volos
- 2006–2007: Panachaiki
- 2008: Niki Volos
- 2008: Lamia
- 2009–2010: Vyzas Megara
- 2010–2011: Korinthos
- 2011–2014: Panegialios
- 2014–2015: Kalamata
- 2016–2017: Kallithea
- 2017: Paniliakos
- 2017: Panegialios
- 2018: Ethnikos Piraeus
- 2019: Rodos
- 2020: Irodotos
- 2021: Nafpaktiakos Asteras
- 2021: Nea Artaki
- 2022–2023: Rodos
- 2023–2024: Rodos
- 2024: Panegialios
- 2024–: Korinthos
- * Club domestic league appearances and goals

Nikos Kourbanas (Greek: Νίκος Κουρμπανάς; born 22 March 1962) is a Greek football manager and former player. He played as a defender.

== Honours ==
- Alpha Ethniki: 1990, 1991
- Greek Cup: 1989, 1991, 1993
- Greek Super Cup: 1988
