= Spyros Marangos =

Greek footballer

Personal information
- Full name: Spyridon Marangos
- Date of birth: 20 February 1967 (age 59)
- Place of birth: Lefkada, Greece
- Position: Midfielder

Youth career
- -1986: Panionios

Senior career*
Years	Team	Apps	(Gls)
1986–1989	Panionios	66	(1)
1989–1996	Panathinaikos	199	(17)
1996–1998	PAOK	51	(9)
1998–1999	Omonia	31	(5)
1999–2000	PAOK	25	(1)
2000–2002	APOEL	44	(4)
Total		416	(37)

International career
1989–1995	Greece	26	(0)

Managerial career
- 2004–2005: Proodeftiki
- 2006–2007: Koropi
- 2016–2019: Panetolikos
- 2016–2019: Panathinaikos (assistant)
- * Club domestic league appearances and goals

Spyros Marangos (Greek: Σπύρος Μαραγκός; born 20 February 1967) is a Greek football coach and former player.

== Career ==
He played for Panionios, Panathinaikos, PAOK, Omonia and APOEL at the club level. He also made 26 appearances for the Greece national football team, and participated at the 1994 FIFA World Cup.

He later became a coach.

== Personal life ==
In 2022 it was revealed that Marangos had been diagnosed with ALS in 2016, and by 2022 his movement has been significantly impaired.
