= Athinaikos F.C. =

Football club in Greece

Athinaikos
- Full name: Athinaikos Athlitikos Syllogos (Athenaic Athletic Association FC)
- Nicknames: Lordi tou Vyrona (Lords of Byron); Athne (Athinaikos Neas Elvetias)
- Founded: 1917; 109 years ago
- Ground: Vyronas National Stadium
- Capacity: 4,500
- Chairman: Nikos Ramantanis
- Manager: Dimitrios Konstantopoulos
- League: Athens FCA First Division
- 2025–26: Athens FCA Second Division (1st group), 1st (promoted)
- Website: http://athinaikosfc.gr/
Home colours	Away colours

Athinaikos, officially known as Athinaikos AS FC (Greek: Αθηναϊκός Αθλητικός Σύλλογος - Athinaikos Athlitikos Syllogos), the Athenaic Athletic Association, is a Greek football club based in the suburban town of Vyronas, located in the Athens agglomeration. The club is also referred to, unofficially, as Athinaikos Vyronas.

== History ==
The club was formed in 1917 and was a foundation member of the Hellenic Football Federation.

At the start of the 1950s, the team was relocated to the suburbs of Vyronas and merged with Nea Elvetia (Greek: Αθλητική Ένωση Νέας Ελβετίας), the local club, which was formed in 1935. The club was named Athinaikos Neas Elvetias AS (Greek: Αθηναϊκός Νέας Ελβετίας Αθλητικός Σύλλογος), but it was commonly referred to as Athinaikos or AthNE (Greek: ΑΘ.Ν.Ε.).

The team plays in the municipal stadium of Vyrona, which has a capacity of 4,340. The team's nickname is Lords of Byron, a reference to George Gordon Byron, 6th Baron Byron, commonly known as Lord Byron, who fought and died for Greek independence. The area of Vyronas was named after him as a tribute.

Athinaikos established two more departments of Handball and Basketball.

The most historical moment of the club was in season 1991–92 when they played against Manchester United in the first round of the Cup Winners' Cup. They drew the first leg 0-0 at home and took the English giants into extra-time at Old Trafford before losing 2-0.

== Honours ==
Athinaikos F.C. honours
Type	Competition	Titles	Winners
Domestic	Beta Ethniki (Second-tier)	2	1989–90, 1999–00

- record
- ^{S} Shared record

== European record ==
Season	Competition	Round	Club	Home	Away	Agg.	Qual.
1991–92	Cup Winners' Cup	1st Round	(England) Manchester United	0–0	2–0	0–2 (a.e.t.)	

== See also ==
- Athinaikos women's basketball
