= 1995–96 AEK Athens F.C. season =

AEK Athens
1995–96 season
- Chairman: Giannis Karras (until 3 October); Michalis Trochanas (until 3 April); Nikos Stratos
- Manager: Dušan Bajević
- Stadium: Nikos Goumas Stadium
- Alpha Ethniki: 2nd
- Greek Cup: Winners
- UEFA Cup Winners' Cup: Second round
- Top goalscorer: League: Vasilios Tsiartas (26); All: Vasilios Tsiartas (32)
- Highest home attendance: 20,740 vs Sion (14 September 1995)
- Lowest home attendance: 828 vs Panegialios (25 October 1995)
- Average home league attendance: 9,217
- Biggest win: Apollon Athens 1–7 AEK Athens; AEK Athens 6–0 Athinaikos
- Biggest defeat: Borussia Mönchengladbach 4–1 AEK Athens
Home colours	Away colours	Third colours

The 1995–96 season was the 72nd season in the existence of AEK Athens F.C. and the 37th consecutive season in the top flight of Greek football. They competed in the Alpha Ethniki, the Greek Cup and the UEFA Cup Winners' Cup. The season began on 20 August 1995 and finished on 29 May 1996.

== Kits ==
Supplier: Kappa
Sponsor(s): Ethniki Asfalistiki, Filmnet

Home	Away	Third

== Overview ==
During the previous season, Michalis Trochanas became the new major shareholder of the club. In collaboration with Dušan Bajević, he retained the core of the successful squad and strengthened it with Batista, who returned from Olympiacos, Maladenis and Pavlopoulos. AEK had a squad full of quality players and this was largely due to the fact that many players were enjoying some of the best seasons of their careers. Bajević managed to accommodate all of the team's key players in the starting lineup and built a team that seemed capable of overpowering any domestic opponent.

In the first round of the UEFA Cup Winners' Cup, AEK were drawn against Sion. With an easy 2–0 win at home they secured qualification. All the Swiss managed at the rematch of Stade Tourbillon was a 2–2 draw. In the second round they faced Borussia Mönchengladbach. In the leg at Bökelbergstadion, AEK initially took control of the match, but in the second half they collapsed. In the final 15 minutes the score became 3–0 and despite a goal by Maladenis, Gladbach effectively ended AEK's hopes of qualification scoring a fourth goal in the dying minutes. The second leg at Nea Filadelfeia was played before a lively crowd, however the hopes turned out to be in vain, since the yellow-blacks created few clear chances. In the end, Effenberg scored the only goal of the match in the 70th minute and AEK were eliminated with two defeats.

AEK played attractive attacking football scoring 87 goals in 34 matches but finished second, behind Panathinaikos, who adopted a more pragmatic approach. During the second round, AEK lost much of their focus as a team, due to the Bajević issue. Sections of the sports media, particularly those close to Olympiacos claimed that the manager of AEK had agreed with Sokratis Kokkalis for his move to the club of Piraeus in the following summer. Initially those reports were dismissed within AEK. However, as Bajević continued to refrain from denying them, anxiety and insecurity increased within the club and the whole story affected the team's performances. At the same time, the situation was further aggravated by the public statements by Trochanas, whose behavior in general was later cited by Bajević for his eventual departure. The 1–0 defeat at the hands of Panathinaikos on 10 April at the Olympic Stadium proved decisive in the title race, as well.

AEK's attacking football was rewarded by winning the Cup. Their triumph left no room for doubt, since the "yellow-blacks" after finishing first in their group, they comfortably eliminated in the knock-out stage Iraklis and both their rivals, Olympiacos and Panathinaikos in the quarter-finals and semi-finals, respectively. In the final AEK scored a record seven goals against Apollon Athens, winning by 7–1, despite Batista being sent off at the 52nd minute.

Although AEK failed to win the league title, the team's attacking style and goalscoring record made the season one of the most memorable in the club's history. Several members of the regular starting lineup enjoyed outstanding individual seasons, with Vasilios Tsiartas finishing as the league's top scorer with 26 goals, with Christos Kostis, Temur Ketsbaia and Batista also reaching double figures in goals.

== Management team ==
Position	Staff
Manager	(Bosnia and Herzegovina) Dušan Bajević
Assistant manager	(Greece) Petros Ravousis
Goalkeeping coach	(Greece) Lakis Stergioudas
Fitness coach	(Greece) Dimitris Bouroutzikas
Academy director	(Greece) Andreas Stamatiadis
Academy manager	(Greece) Apostolos Toskas
Academy manager	(Greece) Giorgos Karafeskos
Scout	(Greece) Aris Tsachouridis
Head of Medical	(Greece) Lakis Nikolaou

== Players ==
=== Squad information ===
NOTE: The players are the ones that have been announced by the AEK Athens' press release. No edits should be made unless a player arrival or exit is announced. Updated 29 May 1996, 23:59 UTC+3.

Player	Nat.	Position(s)	Date of birth (Age)	Signed	Previous club	Transfer fee	Contract until
Goalkeepers
Spyros Ikonomopoulos	(Greece)	GK	25 July 1959 (aged 36)	1979	(Greece) AEK Athens U20	—	1996
Ilias Atmatsidis	(Greece)	GK	24 April 1969 (aged 27)	1992	(Greece) Pontioi Veria	₯40,000,000	1996
Vasilis Karagiannis	(Greece)	GK	27 September 1969 (aged 26)	1993	(Greece) Diagoras	₯20,000,000	1998
Dionysis Chiotis	(Greece)	GK	4 June 1977 (aged 19)	1995	(Greece) AEK Athens U20	—	2005
Defenders
Stelios Manolas (Captain)	(Greece)	CB / RB	13 July 1961 (aged 34)	1980	(Greece) AEK Athens U20	—	1996
Georgios Koutoulas	(Greece)	CB / LB	9 February 1967 (aged 29)	1987	(Greece) AEK Athens U20	—	1999
Michalis Vlachos (Vice-captain)	(Greece)	CB / DM	20 September 1967 (aged 28)	1993	(Greece) Olympiacos	Free	1998
Vaios Karagiannis	(Greece)	LB / CB	25 June 1968 (aged 28)	1990	(Greece) A.O. Karditsa	₯11,000,000	2000
Konstantinos Pavlopoulos	(Greece)	CB	2 July 1968 (aged 27)	1995	(Greece) OFI	Free	1998
Vasilios Borbokis	(Greece)	RB / RM	10 February 1969 (aged 27)	1993	(Greece) Apollon Kalamarias	Free	1997
Charis Kopitsis	(Greece)	RB / RM / LB / LM	5 March 1969 (aged 27)	1992	(Greece) Panionios	Free	1997
Nikos Kostenoglou	(Greece)	CB / RB	3 October 1970 (aged 25)	1994	(Greece) Skoda Xanthi	₯70,000,000	1998
Michalis Kasapis	(Greece)	LB / LM	6 August 1971 (aged 24)	1993	(Greece) Levadiakos	₯25,000,000	1998
Georgios Theodoridis	(Greece)	CB	8 July 1973 (aged 22)	1991	(Greece) Doxa Markochori	₯5,700,000	1998
Midfielders
Toni Savevski	(North Macedonia)	CM / LM / DM	14 July 1963 (aged 32)	1988	(North Macedonia) Vardar	₯34,000,000	1996
Refik Šabanadžović	(Bosnia and Herzegovina) (Federal Republic of Yugoslavia)	DM / CM / CB / RB	2 August 1965 (aged 30)	1991	(Federal Republic of Yugoslavia) Red Star Belgrade	₯18,700,000	1996
Temur Ketsbaia	(Georgia (country))	RM / LM / RW / LW / AM / CM	18 March 1968 (aged 28)	1994	(Cyprus) Anorthosis Famagusta	₯100,000,000	1997
Vasilios Tsiartas (Vice-captain 2)	(Greece)	AM / RM / LM / SS	12 November 1972 (aged 23)	1992	(Greece) Naoussa	₯70,000,000	1997
Christos Maladenis	(Greece)	CM / RM / LM / AM / DM / RW / LW / SS	23 May 1974 (aged 22)	1995	(Greece) Skoda Xanthi	₯100,000,000	2000
Forwards
Dimitris Saravakos	(Greece)	RW / LW / SS / AM	26 July 1961 (aged 34)	1994	(Greece) Panathinaikos	Free	1997
Daniel Batista	(Greece) (Cape Verde)	ST / SS / AM	9 September 1964 (aged 31)	1995	(Greece) Olympiacos	Free	1997
Vasilis Dimitriadis	(Greece)	ST	1 February 1966 (aged 30)	1991	(Greece) Aris	₯95,000,000	1998
Christos Kostis	(Greece)	SS / ST / AM / RW / LW	15 January 1972 (aged 24)	1994	(Greece) Iraklis	₯350,000,000	1998
Ilias Anastasakos	(Greece)	ST / LW / LM	3 March 1978 (aged 18)	1995	(Greece) A.O. Dafniou	Free	2002
Left during Winter Transfer Window
Georgios Agorogiannis	(Greece)	RB / RM / RW	3 May 1966 (aged 30)	1992	(Greece) AEL	₯35,000,000	1996
Stavros Stamatis	(Greece)	DM / CM / CB / RB / LB / AM	31 January 1966 (aged 30)	1988	(Greece) Charavgiakos	₯22,000,000	1996

== Transfers ==
=== In ===
==== Summer ====
Pos.	Player	From	Fee	Date	Contract Until	Source
DF	(Greece) Georgios Theodoridis	(Greece) Edessaikos	Loan return	1 July 1995	30 June 1998	
DF	(Greece) Konstantinos Pavlopoulos	(Greece) OFI	Free transfer	1 July 1995	30 June 1998	
MF	(Greece) Christos Maladenis	(Greece) Skoda Xanthi	₯100,000,000	14 June 1995	30 June 2000	
MF	(Greece) Pantelis Konstantinidis	(Greece) Kavala	Loan return	1 July 1995	30 June 1998	
FW	(Greece) Daniel Batista	(Greece) Olympiacos	Free transfer	1 July 1995	30 June 1997	
FW	(Switzerland) Samouil Drakopulos	(Greece) PAS Giannina	Loan termination	30 August 1995	31 December 1995	
FW	(Greece) Ilias Anastasakos	(Greece) A.O. Dafniou	Free transfer	1 July 1995	30 June 2002	

==== Winter ====
Pos.	Player	From	Fee	Date	Contract Until	Source
GK	(Greece) Dionysis Chiotis	(Greece) AEK Athens U20	Promotion	31 December 1995	30 June 2005	
MF	(Greece) Stathis Karalagas	(Greece) Aiolikos	Loan return	1 January 1996	30 June 1997	

=== Out ===
==== Summer ====
Pos.	Player	To	Fee	Date	Source
DF	(Greece) Manolis Papadopoulos	(Greece) Apollon Athens	End of contract	13 July 1995	
FW	(Switzerland) Samouil Drakopulos	(Switzerland) Neuchâtel Xamax	Free transfer	1 September 1995	

==== Winter ====
Pos.	Player	To	Fee	Date	Source
DF	(Greece) Georgios Agorogiannis	(Greece) Panionios	Free transfer	14 December 1995	
MF	(Greece) Stavros Stamatis	(Greece) Ionikos	Free transfer	1 December 1995	
MF	(Greece) Stathis Karalagas	(Greece) Agios Dimitrios	Free transfer	2 January 1996	

=== Loan out ===
==== Summer ====
Pos.	Player	To	Fee	Date	Until	Option to buy	Source
MF	(Greece) Pantelis Konstantinidis	(Greece) Kavala	Free	6 July 1995	30 June 1996	✓	

=== Contract renewals ===
Pos.	Player	Date	Former Exp. Date	New Exp. Date	Source
GK	(Greece) Spyros Ikonomopoulos	16 June 1995	30 June 1995	30 June 1996	
DF	(Greece) Stelios Manolas	6 July 1995	30 June 1995	30 June 1996	
DF	(Greece) Georgios Koutoulas	30 May 1996	30 June 1996	30 June 1999	
DF	(Greece) Michalis Vlachos	12 June 1995	30 June 1995	30 June 1998	
DF	(Greece) Georgios Theodoridis	1 June 1995	30 June 1995	30 June 1998	
DF	(Greece) Vaios Karagiannis	1 July 1995	30 June 1996	30 June 2000	
MF	(Georgia (country)) Temur Ketsbaia	13 July 1995	30 June 1995	30 June 1997	
FW	(Greece) Vasilis Dimitriadis	30 May 1996	30 June 1996	30 June 1998	

=== Overall transfer activity ===
==== Expenditure ====
Summer: ▼ ₯100,000,000

Winter: ▼ ₯0

Total: ▼ ₯0

==== Income ====
Summer: ▲ ₯0

Winter: ▲ ₯0

Total: ▲ ₯0

==== Net Totals ====
Summer: ▼ ₯100,000,000

Winter: ₯0

Total: ▼ ₯100,000,000

== Pre-season and friendlies ==
17 July 1995 Friendly	Wil	0–2	AEK Athens	Wil
20:15 EEST (UTC+3)		Report	Dimitriadis 16'; Saravakos 17'	Stadium: Sportpark Bergholz; Attendance: 2,000
Note: 45-minute match.

17 July 1995 Friendly	Bayer Leverkusen	0–2	AEK Athens	Wil
21:00 EEST (UTC+3)		Report	Batista 17', 27'	Stadium: Sportpark Bergholz; Attendance: 2,000
Note: 45-minute match.

22 July 1995 Friendly	Freiburg	1–1	AEK Athens	Konstanz
19:30 EEST (UTC+3)	Todt 16'; Vogel (yellow card) 71'	Report	Saravakos 72'	Stadium: Bodenseestadion; Attendance: 4,900

26 July 1995 Friendly	Wangen 05	0–3	AEK Athens	Wangen
19:00 EEST (UTC+3)		Report	Vaios Karagiannis (yellow card) 18'; Kostis 20'; Dimitriadis 49'; Pavlopoulos 75'	Stadium: Allgäu Stadium; Attendance: 2,000

29 July 1995 Friendly	FC Hard	0–8	AEK Athens	Hard
19:30 EEST (UTC+3)		Report	Maladenis 29'; Tsiartas 30', 37'; Batista 64', 82'; Ketsbaia 73'; Manolas 74'; Dimitriadis 76'	Stadium: Waldstadion Hard

2 August 1995 Friendly	AEK Athens	3–1	Partizan	Nea Filadelfeia
21:15 EEST (UTC+3)	Borbokis 5'; Tsiartas 26' (pen.); Pavlopoulos 56'	Report	Tešović 17'	Stadium: Nikos Goumas Stadium; Attendance: 10,038; Referee: Spyros Papadakos (Laconia)

4 August 1995 Giorgos Savvidis Testimonial	Omonia	1–2	AEK Athens	Nicosia
20:00 EEST (UTC+3)	Đukanović 65'	Report	Maladenis 78'; Kostis 90'	Stadium: Makario Stadium; Attendance: 15,000

7 August 1995 Friendly	AEK Athens	2–2	Vasco da Gama	Nea Filadelfeia
19:00 EEST (UTC+3)	Kostis 73'; Savevski 76' (pen.)	Report	Valdir 13' (pen.), 28'; Caetano (yellow card) 75'	Stadium: Nikos Goumas Stadium; Attendance: 4,446; Referee: Giorgos Spaneas (Athens)

9 August 1995 Friendly	AEK Athens	4–2	Skoda Xanthi	Nea Filadelfeia
18:30 EEST (UTC+3)	Dimitriadis 5'; Ketsbaia 15'; Kostis 47'; Šabanadžović (yellow card) 66'; Tsiartas 79'	Report	Panou 42'; Vryzas 57'; Vilanakis (penalty missed) 62'	Stadium: Nikos Goumas Stadium; Attendance: 896; Referee: Giorgos Douros (Corinthia)

11 August 1995 Christos Ardizoglou Testimonial	AEK Athens	2–1	Apollon Athens	Nea Filadelfeia
21:00 EEST (UTC+3)	Dimitriadis 20', 57'	Report	Barnjak 52'	Stadium: Nikos Goumas Stadium; Attendance: 8,000; Referee: Sotiris Vorgias (Athens)

2 September 1995 Friendly	AEK Athens	5–0	Aspropyrgos	Nea Filadelfeia
18:00 EEST (UTC+3)	Borbokis 13'; Saravakos 26'; Dimitriadis 50' (pen.), 87' (pen.); Kostis 78'	Report		Stadium: Nikos Goumas Stadium; Attendance: 800; Referee: Giannis Papageorgiou (Athens)

17 April 1996 Friendly	AEK Athens	3–1	Proodeftiki	Nea Filadelfeia
17:30 EEST (UTC+3)	Batista 6'; Tsiartas 34' (pen.), 60'	Report	Afash 71' (pen.)	Stadium: Nikos Goumas Stadium; Attendance: 200; Referee: Giannis Papageorgiou (Athens)

20 April 1996 Friendly	AEK Athens	4–0	Ionikos	Nea Filadelfeia
17:30 EEST (UTC+3)	Kostis 3'; Ketsbaia 9', 75'; Dimitriadis 60'	Report		Stadium: Nikos Goumas Stadium; Attendance: 500

== Competitions ==
=== Overall record ===
Competition	First match	Last match	Starting round	Final position	Record							
Competition	First match	Last match	Starting round	Final position	Pld	W	D	L	GF	GA	GD	Win %
Alpha Ethniki	27 August 1995	29 May 1996	Matchday 1	2nd	34	25	6	3	87	22	+65	73.53
Greek Cup	20 August 1995	15 May 1996	Group Stage	Winners	13	10	2	1	38	12	+26	76.92
UEFA Cup Winners' Cup	14 September 1995	2 November 1995	First round	Second round	4	1	1	2	5	7	−2	25.00
Total					51	36	9	6	130	41	+89	70.59

Last updated: 29 May 1996
Source: Competitions

=== Alpha Ethniki ===
==== League table ====
Pos	Team	Pld	W	D	L	GF	GA	GD	Pts	Qualification or relegation
1	Panathinaikos (C)	34	26	5	3	72	22	+50	83	Qualification for Champions League qualifying round
2	AEK Athens	34	25	6	3	87	22	+65	81	Qualification for Cup Winners' Cup first round
3	Olympiacos	34	19	8	7	66	34	+32	65	Qualification for UEFA Cup first round
4	Iraklis	34	17	7	10	51	39	+12	58	Qualification for UEFA Cup qualifying round
5	OFI	34	17	6	11	57	52	+5	57	

Source: RSSSF
Rules for classification: 1st points; 2nd head-to-head points; 3rd head-to-head goal difference; 4th decision match.
(C) Champions

==== Results summary ====
Overall								Home						Away					
Pld	W	D	L	GF	GA	GD	Pts	W	D	L	GF	GA	GD	W	D	L	GF	GA	GD
34	25	6	3	87	22	+65	81	16	1	0	54	6	+48	9	5	3	33	16	+17

Source: Competitive matches

==== Results by Matchday ====
Round	1	2	3	4	5	6	7	8	9	10	11	12	13	14	15	16	17	18	19	20	21	22	23	24	25	26	27	28	29	30	31	32	33	34
Ground	H	A	H	A	H	H	A	H	A	H	A	H	A	A	H	A	H	A	H	A	H	A	A	H	A	H	A	H	A	H	H	A	H	A
Result	W	L	W	W	W	W	W	D	W	W	W	W	W	L	W	W	W	W	W	D	W	W	D	W	D	W	L	W	D	W	W	D	W	W
Position	1	9	5	5	4	3	3	3	2	1	1	1	1	2	2	2	2	2	1	1	1	1	2	2	2	2	2	2	2	2	2	2	2	2

Source: Competitive matches
A = Away; H = Home; W = Win; D = Draw; L = Loss; P = Postponed

==== Matches ====
27 August 1995 1	AEK Athens	3–0	Paniliakos	Nea Filadelfeia
20:00 EEST (UTC+3)	Kostis 37'; Batista 55'; Šabanadžović 64'			Stadium: Nikos Goumas Stadium; Attendance: Behind closed doors Referee: Ilias Chatzis (Karditsa)

10 September 1995 2	Aris	2–1	AEK Athens	Thessaloniki
20:00 EEST (UTC+3)	Lekbello (yellow card) 17', (goal) 24'; Koltsidas (yellow card) 22'; Mavrogenidis (yellow card) 54'; Lončar (yellow card) 61'; Kofidis (yellow card) 62'; Toutziaris 76'		Pavlopoulos (yellow card) 13'; Borbokis (yellow card) 51'; Batista (yellow card) 56'; Tsiartas 74' (pen.)	Stadium: Aris Stadium; Attendance: 14,934; Referee: Spyros Papadakos (Laconia)

17 September 1995 3	AEK Athens	5–1	Panachaiki	Nea Filadelfeia
17:30 EEST (UTC+3)	Tsiartas 5', 47'; Pavlopoulos 19'; Ketsbaia 38'; Kostis 77'		Dafkos (yellow card); Georgatos (yellow card); Klejch 77'	Stadium: Nikos Goumas Stadium; Attendance: 11,004; Referee: Vassilios Nikakis (Aetoloacarnania)

24 September 1995 4	Ethnikos Piraeus	0–3	AEK Athens	Piraeus
20:00 EEST (UTC+3)	Dimopoulos (yellow card); Angelis (yellow card) 1'; Tsiaousis (yellow card) 44'		Šabanadžović 13'; Batista 22'; Tsiartas 43'; Manolas (yellow card) 63'	Stadium: Karaiskakis Stadium; Attendance: 9,029; Referee: Malamas Tevekelis (Thessaloniki)

2 October 1995 5	AEK Athens	3–1	Iraklis	Nea Filadelfeia
18:00 EEST (UTC+3)	Maladenis 14'; Tsiartas 36'; Savevski 76'; Vlachos (yellow card) 88'		Mirtsekis 34'	Stadium: Nikos Goumas Stadium; Attendance: 10,872; Referee: Giorgos Douros (Corinthia)

23 February 1997 6	AEK Athens	5–1	Kalamata	Nea Filadelfeia
17:00 EET (UTC+2)	Kostenoglou (yellow card); Ketsbaia 17'; Kostis 37'; Dimitriadis 63' (pen.); Šabanadžović 77'; Tsiartas 87'		Tengelidis (yellow card); Bellaj 21', (yellow card)	Stadium: Nikos Goumas Stadium; Attendance: 14,689; Referee: Manolis Giannadakis (Lasithi)

23 October 1995 7	Ionikos	1–4	AEK Athens	Nikaia
15:00 EEST (UTC+3)	Daraklitsas (yellow card); Novokhatsky 2'		Vlachos (yellow card); Tsiartas 35', 69'; Manolas 54', (yellow card); Ketsbaia 56'	Stadium: Neapoli Stadium; Attendance: 3,248; Referee: Kyros Vassaras (Thessaloniki)

28 October 1995 8	AEK Athens	1–1	Olympiacos	Nea Filadelfeia
19:00 EEST (UTC+3)	Dimitriadis (yellow card); Vlachos (yellow card); Pavlopoulos (yellow card); Kostis 87'		Sapanis (yellow card); Skartados (yellow card); Kalantzis 81'	Stadium: Nikos Goumas Stadium; Attendance: 14,593; Referee: Kyros Vassaras (Thessaloniki)

6 November 1995 9	PAOK	1–3	AEK Athens	Thessaloniki
18:00 EET (UTC+2)	Zouboulis 9'		Tsiartas 33', (yellow card); Ketsbaia (yellow card) 21', (goal) 45'; Kostis 61'	Stadium: Toumba Stadium; Attendance: 7,946; Referee: Thanasis Vellios (Xanthi)
Note: The game was initially interrupted for a few minutes at the 65th minute due to objects hitting τηε linesman, Pachtitis and at 74th minute was finally interrupted due to the invasion of PAOK fans on the field. At that minute the score was 1–3 for AEK and remained as final score.

18 November 1995 10	AEK Athens	1–0	Panathinaikos	Nea Filadelfeia
19:15 EET (UTC+2)	Šabanadžović (yellow card); Kostis 12'; Borbokis (yellow card) 19'; Maladenis (yellow card) 28'; Savevski (yellow card) 56'		Christodoulou (yellow card) 26'; Kalitzakis (yellow card) 65' (yellow-red card) 85'; Alexoudis (yellow card) 67'; G. Ch. Georgiadis (yellow card) 70'	Stadium: Nikos Goumas Stadium; Attendance: 16,985; Referee: Naoum Mintiouris (Serres)

26 November 1995 11	Apollon Athens	0–3	AEK Athens	Rizoupoli
15:00 EET (UTC+2)	Lachanas (yellow card) 40'; Erak (yellow card) 56'		Šabanadžović (yellow card) 25'; Batista 33'; Manolas 53'; Ketsbaia 58'; Tsiartas (penalty missed) 76'	Stadium: Rizoupoli Stadium; Attendance: 8,185; Referee: Dionysis Stefanopoulos (Piraeus)

3 December 1995 12	AEK Athens	4–0	OFI	Nea Filadelfeia
20:00 EET (UTC+2)	Ketsbaia 9'; Tsiartas 35'; Kostis 54'; Kasapis (yellow card) 70'; Saravakos 80'		Koutsoupias (yellow card) 45'; Skentzos (yellow card) 78'	Stadium: Nikos Goumas Stadium; Attendance: 9,443; Referee: Giorgos Bikas (Chalkidiki)

9 December 1995 13	Edessaikos	2–5	AEK Athens	Edessa
15:00 EET (UTC+2)	Kotsifas 15'; Čolaković 90'		Ketsbaia 6'; Batista 36', 63', 66'; Kostis 70'	Stadium: Municipal Stadium of Edessa; Attendance: 2,422; Referee: Thanasis Zachariadis (Thessaloniki)

17 December 1995 14	AEL	1–0	AEK Athens	Larissa
	Stoica (yellow card); Papadopoulos 18'		Kasapis (yellow card)	Stadium: Alcazar Stadium; Attendance: 5,968; Referee: Lazaros Papadopoulos (Thessaloniki)

7 January 1996 15	AEK Athens	2–1	Skoda Xanthi	Nea Filadelfeia
15:00 EET (UTC+2)	Ketsbaia (yellow card); Kostis 15'; Tsiartas 85'		Venetidis (yellow card); Iosifidis (yellow card) (yellow-red card) 50'; Vilanakis (yellow card); Nečas 45'	Stadium: Nikos Goumas Stadium; Attendance: 11,435; Referee: Giorgos Douros (Corinthia)

13 January 1996 16	Athinaikos	0–1	AEK Athens	Vyronas
15:00 EET (UTC+2)	Dabić (yellow card); Alvertis (yellow card); Boutzoukas (yellow card) 41'		Atmatsidis (yellow card); Kopitsis (yellow card); Tsiartas 42'	Stadium: Vyronas National Stadium; Attendance: 3,202; Referee: Malamas Tevekelis (Thessaloniki)

21 January 1996 17	AEK Athens	2–0	Panionios	Nea Filadelfeia
15:00 EET (UTC+2)	Kasapis (yellow card); Šabanadžović (yellow card); Manolas 11', (yellow card); Tsiartas 64'		Tzoulis (yellow card) 66'; Vakalopoulos (yellow card) 86'	Stadium: Nikos Goumas Stadium; Attendance: 6,071; Referee: Dimitris Begos (Argolida)

27 January 1996 18	Paniliakos	0–2	AEK Athens	Pyrgos
15:00 EET (UTC+2)	Ilić (yellow card) 40'		Manolas (yellow card) 1'; Savevski 59'; Lygnos 79' (o.g.); Kopitsis (yellow card) 80'	Stadium: Pyrgos Stadium; Attendance: 5,691; Referee: Giorgos Bikas (Chalkidiki)

4 February 1996 19	AEK Athens	4–0	Aris	Nea Filadelfeia
18:00 EET (UTC+2)	Tsiartas 26', 68', 73'; Kostis 48'			Stadium: Nikos Goumas Stadium; Attendance: 9,981; Referee: Dionysis Stefanopoulos (Piraeus)

11 February 1996 20	Panachaiki	1–1	AEK Athens	Patras
15:00 EET (UTC+2)	Gotzias (yellow card) 4'; Mikes 34', (yellow card) 63'; Roussos (yellow card) 55'; Vaitsis (yellow card) 85'		Borbokis 12'	Stadium: Kostas Davourlis Stadium; Referee: Malamas Tevekelis (Thessaloniki)

18 February 1996 21	AEK Athens	3–1	Ethnikos Piraeus	Nea Filadelfeia
15:30 EET (UTC+2)	Tsiartas 50'; Ketsbaia 79', 83'; Kostenoglou (yellow card) 89'		Tsiaousis (yellow card) 12'; Kamitsis (yellow card) 29'; Niniadis 89' (pen.)	Stadium: Nikos Goumas Stadium; Referee: Thanasis Zachariadis (Thessaloniki)

25 February 1996 22	Iraklis	1–3	AEK Athens	Thessaloniki
15:30 EET (UTC+2)	Georgamlis (yellow card); G. Kostis 46'		Pavlopoulos (yellow card); Batista 43'; C. Kostis 69'; Ketsbaia 79'	Stadium: Kaftanzoglio Stadium; Referee: Manolis Giannadakis (Lasithi)

3 March 1996 23	Kalamata	2–2	AEK Athens	Kalamata
16:00 EET (UTC+2)	Johnson 30'; Bellaj 90'		Ketsbaia (yellow card) 20' (yellow-red card) 63', (goal) 43', 62'	Stadium: Messiniakos Stadium; Attendance: 7,899; Referee: Michalis Kalathenos (Dodecanese)

10 March 1996 24	AEK Athens	6–0	Ionikos	Nea Filadelfeia
16:00 EET (UTC+2)	Batista 51', 60', (yellow card) 76'; Tsiartas 56' (pen.), 63', 90'; Borbokis (yellow card) 67'; Kostis 72'		Sidiropoulos (yellow card); Giourgousis (yellow card) 55'	Stadium: Nikos Goumas Stadium; Attendance: 7,330; Referee: Giannis Latsios (Larissa)

17 March 1996 25	Olympiacos	1–1	AEK Athens	Piraeus
20:00 EET (UTC+2)	Skartados (yellow card) 37'; Sapanis (yellow card) 53'; Karapialis 56'; Kalantzis (yellow card) 87'		Tsiartas 15'; Kasapis (yellow card) 17' (yellow-red card) 89'; Manolas (yellow card) 33' (red card) 81'; Borbokis (yellow card) 51'; Ketsbaia (yellow card) 80'	Stadium: Karaiskakis Stadium; Attendance: 16,246; Referee: Argyris Papachintzios (Thessaloniki)

23 March 1996 26	AEK Athens	4–0	PAOK	Nea Filadelfeia
17:00 EET (UTC+2)	Tsiartas 24' (pen.), 62'; Kostis 27', 65'		Van Ham (yellow card) 36'; Voltezos (yellow card) 55'; Anastasiadis (yellow card) 75'	Stadium: Nikos Goumas Stadium; Attendance: 8,000; Referee: Manolis Giannadakis (Lasithi)

10 April 1996 27	Panathinaikos	1–0	AEK Athens	Marousi
17:00 EEST (UTC+3)	Kalitzakis (yellow card); Kolitsidakis (yellow card); G. Ch. Georgiadis (yellow card); Borrelli 79'		Šabanadžović (yellow card); Atmatsidis (yellow card); Borbokis (yellow card)	Stadium: Olympic Stadium; Referee: Dionysis Stefanopoulos (Piraeus)
Note: The game was originally to take place on 1 April, but Panathinaikos requested its postponement because of the match against Ajax for the UEFA Champions League.

7 April 1996 28	AEK Athens	1–0	Apollon Athens	Nea Filadelfeia
17:00 EEST (UTC+3)	Vlachos (yellow card); Kostis 2'			Stadium: Nikos Goumas Stadium; Attendance: 10,815; Referee: Georgios Psychomanis (Athens)

28 April 1996 29	OFI	1–1	AEK Athens	Heraklion
19:15 EEST (UTC+3)	Moutas (yellow card); Kiassos 66'		Kostenoglou (yellow card); Kostis (yellow card); Ketsbaia 14'	Stadium: Theodoros Vardinogiannis Stadium; Attendance: 8,293; Referee: Argyris Papachintzios (Thessaloniki)

5 May 1996 30	AEK Athens	3–0	Edessaikos	Nea Filadelfeia
19:15 EEST (UTC+3)	Borbokis 34'; Ketsbaia 67'; Batista 74'		Kastaniotis (yellow card)	Stadium: Nikos Goumas Stadium; Attendance: 7,692; Referee: Argyris Papachintzios (Thessaloniki)

12 May 1996 31	AEK Athens	1–0	AEL	Nea Filadelfeia
	Vaios Karagiannis (yellow card); Kostis 8'		Embé (yellow card)	Stadium: Nikos Goumas Stadium; Attendance: 6,300; Referee: Thanasis Zachariadis (Thessaloniki)

19 May 1996 32	Skoda Xanthi	1–1	AEK Athens	Xanthi
17:00 EEST (UTC+3)	Macheridis (yellow card); Venetidis (yellow card); Kogioglou (yellow card); Vryzas 5'		Kostis 15', (yellow card)	Stadium: A.O. Xanthi Stadium; Attendance: 5,985; Referee: Vangelis Pouflis (Pella)

26 May 1996 33	AEK Athens	6–0	Athinaikos	Nea Filadelfeia
17:00 EEST (UTC+3)	Kostis 19'; Zotalis 30' (o.g.); Kopitsis 40'; Tsiartas 55' (pen.), 57', 68'		Sidiropoulos (yellow card) (yellow-red card) 53'	Stadium: Nikos Goumas Stadium; Attendance: 3,451; Referee: Argyris Papachintzios (Thessaloniki)

29 May 1996 34	Panionios	1–2	AEK Athens	Nea Smyrni
20:15 EEST (UTC+3)	Sapountzis 14'; Giannakouris (yellow card) 22'; Vokolos (yellow card) 34'		Vas. Karagiannis (yellow card) 15'; Kostis 27'; Kostenoglou (yellow card) 29' (yellow-red card) 89'; Giannakouris 44' (o.g.); Ketsbaia (yellow card) 49'	Stadium: Nea Smyrni Stadium; Attendance: 1,855; Referee: Tasos Vlachos (Athens)

=== Greek Cup ===
==== Group 1 ====
Pos	Team	Pld	W	D	L	GF	GA	GD	Pts	Qualification	PAO	AEK	PAN	OLY	ALM
1	Panathinaikos	4	4	0	0	10	2	+8	12	Round of 32		3–1	2–0	—	—
2	AEK Athens	4	3	0	1	13	6	+7	9	Round of 32	—		4–1	—	6–2
3	Panegialios	4	2	0	2	7	8	−1	6		—	—		3–0	3–2
4	Olympiacos Volos	4	0	1	3	3	9	−6	1		0–1	0–2	—		—
5	Almopos Aridea	4	0	1	3	9	16	−7	1		1–4	—	3–3	—	

Source: epo.gr

==== Matches ====
20 August 1995 1	AEK Athens	6–2	Almopos Aridea	Nea Filadelfeia
20:00 EEST (UTC+3)	Kostis 16', 52'; Batista 24'; Ketsbaia 54'; Dimitriadis 63'; Tsiartas 82'		Spasić 28', 79'	Stadium: Nikos Goumas Stadium; Attendance: Behind closed doors Referee: Spyros Papadakos (Laconia)

5 October 1995 2	Olympiacos Volos	0–2	AEK Athens	Lamia
15:30 EEST (UTC+3)	Panopoulos (yellow card); Kotoulas (yellow card); Mandalos (yellow card); Filitsopoulos (yellow card)		Dimitriadis 47'; Šabanadžović 50'	Stadium: Lamia Municipal Stadium; Attendance: 3,523; Referee: Giorgos Bikas (Chalkidiki)

25 October 1995 3	AEK Athens	4–1	Panegialios	Nea Filadelfeia
15:00 EEST (UTC+3)	Saravakos 34', 49'; Kostis 57'; Borbokis 74'		Zavogiannis (yellow card); Karanikolas 39'	Stadium: Nikos Goumas Stadium; Attendance: 828; Referee: Dimitris Begos (Argolida)

9 November 1995 4	Panathinaikos	3–1	AEK Athens	Marousi
15:00 EET (UTC+2)	Christodoulou 12'; Alexoudis 27'; Georgiadis 29'		Kopitsis (yellow card); Maladenis (yellow card); Saravakos 41'	Stadium: Olympic Stadium; Attendance: 1,662; Referee: Giorgos Giannopoulos (Athens)

===== Round of 32 =====
29 November 1995 First leg	AEK Athens	1–0	Iraklis	Nea Filadelfeia
18:30 EET (UTC+2)	Ketsbaia (yellow card) 37'; Manolas (yellow card) 65'; Saravakos 81'; Maladenis (yellow card) 89'		Pavlović (yellow card) 12'; S. Borbokis (yellow card) 20'; Christodoulou (yellow card) 41'; Mirtsekis (yellow card) 72'; Talikriadis (yellow card) 85'; Papadopoulos (yellow card) 86'; Pantelić (yellow card) 87'	Stadium: Nikos Goumas Stadium; Attendance: 3,701; Referee: Michalis Kalathenos (Dodecanese)

20 December 1995 Second leg	Iraklis	0–2 (0–3 agg.)	AEK Athens	Thessaloniki
18:00 EET (UTC+2)			Šabanadžović (yellow card); C. Kostis 33'; Tsiartas 65', (yellow card)	Stadium: Kaftanzoglio Stadium; Attendance: 3,817; Referee: Christos Sotiropoulos (Piraeus)

===== Round of 16 =====
3 January 1996 First leg	Olympiacos	1–3	AEK Athens	Marousi
18:15 EET (UTC+2)	Kremenliev (yellow card) 13'; Ivić 64' (pen.), (yellow card) 89'; Kalantzis (yellow card) 80'	Report (page 1)	Manolas (yellow card) 19' (yellow-red card) 53'; Batista 21', 47'; Kostis 27'; Kostenoglou (yellow card) 59' (yellow-red card) 74'	Stadium: Olympic Stadium; Attendance: 24,585; Referee: Thanasis Vellios (Xanthi)

17 January 1996 Second leg	AEK Athens	1–1 (4–2 agg.)	Olympiacos	Nea Filadelfeia
18:15 EET (UTC+2)	Vlachos (yellow card) 60'; Tsiartas 72' (pen.)	Report (page 1)	Alexandris (yellow card) 11'; Ivić 37'; Skartados (yellow card) 76'	Stadium: Nikos Goumas Stadium; Attendance: 7,234; Referee: Michalis Kalathenos (Dodecanese)

===== Quarter-finals =====
31 January 1996 First leg	AEK Athens	3–1	Panathinaikos	Nea Filadelfeia
15:00 EET (UTC+2)	Kalitzakis 28' (o.g.); Kostis 54'; Ketsbaia 78'	Report (page 3)	Alexoudis 89'; Christodoulou (yellow card) 90'	Stadium: Nikos Goumas Stadium; Attendance: 14,253; Referee: Georgios Psychomanis (Athens)

14 February 1996 Second leg	Panathinaikos	2–2 (3–5 agg.)	AEK Athens	Marousi
15:00 EET (UTC+2)	Warzycha 16', 20'	Report (page 3)	Ketsbaia 2'; Batista 6', (yellow card) 34'; Manolas (yellow card) 23'; Vlachos (yellow card) 83'; Kasapis (yellow card) 85'	Stadium: Olympic Stadium; Attendance: 29,862; Referee: Thanasis Vellios (Xanthi)

===== Semi-finals =====
28 February 1996 First leg	AEK Athens	5–0	Athinaikos	Nea Filadelfeia
19:00 EET (UTC+2)	Batista 19', 40', 90'; Kopitsis 24'; Manolas (yellow card) 71'; Kostis 73'	Report (page 4)	Anastasiou (yellow card) 7'	Stadium: Nikos Goumas Stadium; Attendance: 6,500; Referee: Michalis Kalathenos (Dodecanese)

13 March 1996 Second leg	Athinaikos	0–1 (0–6 agg.)	AEK Athens	Vyronas
15:00 EET (UTC+2)	Anastasiou (yellow card) 8'	Report (page 4)	Kasapis (yellow card) 21'; Kostenoglou 88'	Stadium: Vyronas National Stadium; Attendance: 545; Referee: Malamas Tevekelis (Thessaloniki)

===== Final =====
15 May 1996 Final	Apollon Athens	1–7	AEK Athens	Marousi
17:30 EEST (UTC+3)	Erak (yellow card) 25'; Kefalas (yellow card) 76'; Barnjak 78'	Report (page 5)	Vlachos (yellow card) 2'; Kasapis (yellow card) 3'; Borbokis (yellow card) 9'; Batista 11', 34', (red card) 53'; Tsiartas 22', 48' (pen.), 76'; Manolas (yellow card) 30'; Ketsbaia 60'; Kostis 89'	Stadium: Olympic Stadium; Attendance: 31,563; Referee: Christos Sotiropoulos (Piraeus)

=== UEFA Cup Winners' Cup ===
==== First round ====
14 September 1995 First leg	AEK Athens (Greece)	2–0	(Switzerland) Sion	Athens, Greece
21:00 EEST (UTC+3)	Vlachos (yellow card) 36', (goal) 45'; Borbokis 70'; Manolas (yellow card) 73'	Report	Mirandinha (yellow card) 48'; Quentin (yellow card) 61'	Stadium: Nikos Goumas Stadium; Attendance: 20,740; Referee: Frans van den Wijngaert (Belgium)

28 September 1995 Second leg	Sion (Switzerland)	2–2 (2–4 agg.)	(Greece) AEK Athens	Sion, Switzerland
21:30 EEST (UTC+3)	Bonvin 20'; Quentin (yellow card) 58'; Giallanza 84'; Lehmann (yellow card) 87'	Report	Atmatsidis (yellow card) 56'; Manolas (yellow card) 57'; Ketsbaia 82'; Batista 87'	Stadium: Stade Tourbillon; Attendance: 6,900; Referee: Loris Stafoggia (Italy)

==== Second round ====
19 October 1995 First leg	Borussia Mönchengladbach (Germany)	4–1	(Greece) AEK Athens	Mönchengladbach, Germany
21:30 EEST (UTC+3)	Frontzeck (yellow card) 20'; Dahlin 50', 90'; Pflipsen 55'; Wynhoff 66'	Report	Kostenoglou (yellow card) 49'; Maladenis 78'; Šabanadžović (yellow card) 79'	Stadium: Bökelbergstadion; Attendance: 21,200; Referee: Jorge Monteiro Coroado (Portugal)

2 November 1995 Second leg	AEK Athens (Greece)	0–1 (1–5 agg.)	(Germany) Borussia Mönchengladbach	Athens, Greece
21:30 EEST (UTC+3)	Vlachos (yellow card) 25'	Report	Effenberg (yellow card) 62', (goal) 70'	Stadium: Nikos Goumas Stadium; Attendance: 14,380; Referee: Leslie Mottram (Scotland)

== Statistics ==
=== Squad statistics ===
As of 29 May 1996

No.	Pos	Player	Alpha Ethniki		Greek Cup		Cup Winners' Cup		Total	
No.	Pos	Player	Apps	Goals	Apps	Goals	Apps	Goals	Apps	Goals
Goalkeepers
—	GK	(Greece) Spyros Ikonomopoulos	0	0	0	0	0	0	0	0
—	GK	(Greece) Ilias Atmatsidis	30	0	11	0	4	0	45	0
—	GK	(Greece) Vasilis Karagiannis	4	0	3	0	0	0	7	0
—	GK	(Greece) Dionysis Chiotis	0	0	0	0	0	0	0	0
Defenders
—	DF	(Greece) Stelios Manolas	22	3	9	0	3	0	34	3
—	DF	(Greece) Georgios Koutoulas	4	0	5	0	1	0	10	0
—	DF	(Greece) Michalis Vlachos	23	0	9	0	4	1	36	1
—	DF	(Greece) Vaios Karagiannis	14	0	6	0	0	0	20	0
—	DF	(Greece) Konstantinos Pavlopoulos	15	1	6	0	0	0	21	1
—	DF	(Greece) Vasilios Borbokis	24	2	10	1	4	1	38	4
—	DF	(Greece) Charis Kopitsis	19	1	10	1	4	0	33	2
—	DF	(Greece) Nikos Kostenoglou	28	0	8	1	3	0	39	1
—	DF	(Greece) Michalis Kasapis	28	0	11	0	4	0	43	0
—	DF	(Greece) Georgios Theodoridis	0	0	1	0	0	0	1	0
Midfielders
—	MF	(North Macedonia) Toni Savevski	31	2	11	0	4	0	46	2
—	MF	(Republic of Bosnia and Herzegovina) Refik Šabanadžović	28	3	9	1	3	0	40	4
—	MF	(Democratic Republic of Georgia) Temur Ketsbaia	31	14	12	4	4	1	47	19
—	MF	(Greece) Vasilios Tsiartas	33	26	10	6	4	0	47	32
—	MF	(Greece) Christos Maladenis	28	1	9	0	4	1	41	2
Forwards
—	FW	(Greece) Dimitris Saravakos	17	1	7	4	3	0	27	5
—	FW	(Greece) Daniel Batista	27	10	10	9	3	1	40	20
—	FW	(Greece) Vasilis Dimitriadis	21	1	8	2	2	0	31	3
—	FW	(Greece) Christos Kostis	34	19	13	8	2	0	49	27
—	FW	(Greece) Ilias Anastasakos	0	0	0	0	0	0	0	0
Left during Winter Transfer Window
—	DF	(Greece) Georgios Agorogiannis	0	0	0	0	0	0	0	0
—	MF	(Greece) Stavros Stamatis	1	0	2	0	0	0	3	0

=== Goalscorers ===
As of 29 May 1996
The list is sorted by competition order when total goals are equal, then by position and then alphabetically by surname.

Rank	Pos.	Player	Alpha Ethniki	Greek Cup	Cup Winners' Cup	Total
1	MF	(Greece) Vasilios Tsiartas	26	6	0	32
2	FW	(Greece) Christos Kostis	19	8	0	27
3	FW	(Greece) Daniel Batista	10	9	1	20
4	ΜF	(Georgia (country)) Temur Ketsbaia	14	4	1	19
5	FW	(Greece) Dimitris Saravakos	1	4	0	5
6	MF	(Bosnia and Herzegovina) Refik Šabanadžović	3	1	0	4
6	DF	(Greece) Vasilios Borbokis	2	1	1	4
8	DF	(Greece) Stelios Manolas	3	0	0	3
8	FW	(Greece) Vasilis Dimitriadis	1	2	0	3
10	MF	(North Macedonia) Toni Savevski	2	0	0	2
10	DF	(Greece) Charis Kopitsis	1	1	0	2
10	MF	(Greece) Christos Maladenis	1	0	1	2
13	DF	(Greece) Konstantinos Pavlopoulos	1	0	0	1
13	DF	(Greece) Nikos Kostenoglou	0	1	0	1
13	DF	(Greece) Michalis Vlachos	0	0	1	1
Own goals			3	1	0	4
Totals			87	38	5	130

=== Hat-tricks ===
Numbers in superscript represent the goals that the player scored.

Player	Against	Result	Date	Competition	Source
(Greece) Daniel Batista	(Greece) Edessaikos	5–2 (A)	9 December 1995	Alpha Ethniki	
(Greece) Vasilios Tsiartas	(Greece) Aris	4–0 (H)	4 February 1996	Alpha Ethniki	
(Greece) Daniel Batista	(Greece) Athinaikos	5–0 (H)	28 February 1996	Greek Cup	
(Greece) Vasilios Tsiartas	(Greece) Ionikos	6–0 (H)	10 March 1996	Alpha Ethniki	
(Greece) Vasilios Tsiartas	(Greece) Apollon Athens	7–1 (A)	15 May 1996	Greek Cup	
(Greece) Vasilios Tsiartas	(Greece) Athinaikos	6–0 (H)	26 May 1996	Alpha Ethniki	

=== Assists ===
As of 29 May 1996
The list is sorted by competition order when total assists are equal, then by position and then alphabetically by surname.

Rank	Pos.	Player	Alpha Ethniki	Greek Cup	Cup Winners' Cup	Total
1	MF	(Greece) Vasilios Tsiartas	12	2	0	14
2	MF	(North Macedonia) Toni Savevski	4	9	0	13
3	FW	(Greece) Christos Kostis	9	1	0	10
4	DF	(Greece) Vasilios Borbokis	7	2	0	9
4	FW	(Greece) Daniel Batista	6	3	0	9
4	ΜF	(Georgia (country)) Temur Ketsbaia	5	3	1	9
7	DF	(Greece) Michalis Kasapis	4	3	1	8
8	DF	(Greece) Stelios Manolas	3	1	0	4
8	MF	(Greece) Christos Maladenis	3	1	0	4
10	DF	(Greece) Charis Kopitsis	2	1	0	3
11	DF	(Greece) Michalis Vlachos	1	0	1	2
11	FW	(Greece) Dimitris Saravakos	1	0	1	2
13	DF	(Greece) Vaios Karagiannis	0	1	0	1
Totals			57	27	4	88

=== Clean sheets ===
As of 29 May 1996
The list is sorted by competition order when total clean sheets are equal and then alphabetically by surname. Clean sheets in games where both goalkeepers participated are awarded to the goalkeeper who started the game. Goalkeepers with no appearances are not included.

Rank	Player	Alpha Ethniki	Greek Cup	Cup Winners' Cup	Total
1	(Greece) Ilias Atmatsidis	14	4	1	19
2	(Greece) Vasilis Karagiannis	1	1	0	2
Totals		15	5	1	21

=== Disciplinary record ===
As of 29 May 1996

N	P	Nat.	Name	Alpha Ethniki			Greek Cup			Cup Winners' Cup			Total			Notes
N	P	Nat.	Name	Yellow card	Second yellow card	Red card	Yellow card	Second yellow card	Red card	Yellow card	Second yellow card	Red card	Yellow card	Second yellow card	Red card	Notes
Goalkeepers
—	GK	(Greece)	Spyros Ikonomopoulos													
—	GK	(Greece)	Ilias Atmatsidis	2						1			3			
—	GK	(Greece)	Vasilis Karagiannis	1									1			
—	GK	(Greece)	Dionysis Chiotis													
Defenders
—	DF	(Greece)	Stelios Manolas	5		1	4	1		2			11	1	1	
—	DF	(Greece)	Georgios Koutoulas													
—	DF	(Greece)	Michalis Vlachos	4			3			2			9			
—	DF	(Greece)	Vaios Karagiannis	1									1			
—	DF	(Greece)	Konstantinos Pavlopoulos	3									3			
—	DF	(Greece)	Vasilios Borbokis	6			1						7			
—	DF	(Greece)	Charis Kopitsis	2			1						3			
—	DF	(Greece)	Nikos Kostenoglou	4	1		1	1		1			6	2		
—	DF	(Greece)	Michalis Kasapis	4	1		2						6	1		
—	DF	(Greece)	Georgios Theodoridis													
Midfielders
—	MF	(North Macedonia)	Toni Savevski	2									2			
—	MF	(Republic of Bosnia and Herzegovina)	Refik Šabanadžović	4			1			1			6			
—	MF	(Democratic Republic of Georgia)	Temur Ketsbaia	4	1		1						5	1		
—	MF	(Greece)	Vasilios Tsiartas	1			1						2			
—	MF	(Greece)	Christos Maladenis	2			2						4			
Forwards
—	FW	(Greece)	Dimitris Saravakos													
—	FW	(Greece)	Daniel Batista	3			1						4			
—	FW	(Greece)	Vasilis Dimitriadis	1									1			
—	FW	(Greece)	Christos Kostis	2									2			
—	FW	(Greece)	Ilias Anastasakos													
Left during Winter Transfer window
—	DF	(Greece)	Georgios Agorogiannis													
—	MF	(Greece)	Stavros Stamatis													

=== Starting 11 ===
This section presents the most frequently used formation along with the players with the most starts across all competitions.

N.	Formation	Matchday(s)
44	4–2–1–3	1, 2, 6–33
7	3–5–2	3–5, 34

Nat.	Player	Pos.
(Greece)	Ilias Atmatsidis	GK
(Greece)	Stelios Manolas (C)	RCB
(Greece)	Nikos Kostenoglou	LCB
(Greece)	Vasilios Borbokis	RB
(Greece)	Michalis Kasapis	LB
(Bosnia and Herzegovina)	Refik Šabanadžović	DM
(North Macedonia)	Toni Savevski	CM
(Georgia (country))	Temur Ketsbaia	AM
(Greece)	Vasilios Tsiartas	RW
(Greece)	Christos Kostis	LW
(Greece)	Daniel Batista	CF

Last updated: 1996-05-29

== Awards ==
Player	Pos.	Award	Source
(Greece) Vasilios Tsiartas	MF	Alpha Ethiniki Top Scorer	
(Greece) Demis Nikolaidis	FW	Greek Cup Top Scorer	
(Greece) Vasilios Tsiartas	MF	Greek Player of the Season (shared)	
(Georgia (country)) Temur Ketsbaia	MF	Foreign Player of the Season	
(Bosnia and Herzegovina) Dušan Bajević	—	Manager of the Season	
