= 1991–92 AEK Athens F.C. season =

AEK Athens
1991–92 season
- Chairman: Kostas Generakis (until 17 June); Dimitris Melissanidis
- Manager: Dušan Bajević
- Stadium: Nikos Goumas Stadium
- Alpha Ethniki: 1st
- Greek Cup: Semi-finals
- UEFA Cup: Third round
- Top goalscorer: League: Vasilis Dimitriadis (28); All: Vasilis Dimitriadis (31)
- Highest home attendance: 30,000 vs Spartak Moscow (6 November 1991)
- Lowest home attendance: 1,094 vs Ionikos (22 January 1992)
- Average home league attendance: 13,422
- Biggest win: AEK Athens 6–0 Panionios
- Biggest defeat: PAOK 3–0 AEK Athens
Home colours	Away colours

The 1991–92 season was the 68th season in the existence of AEK Athens F.C. and the 33rd consecutive season in the top flight of Greek football. They competed in the Alpha Ethniki, the Greek Cup and the UEFA Cup. The season began on 18 August 1991 and finished on 7 June 1992.

== Kits ==
Supplier: Diadora
Sponsor(s): Ethniki Asfalistiki

Home	Away

== Overview ==
In the summer of 1991 Kostas Generakis took over as the new president of the club, despite Andreas Zafiropoulos remaining the majority shareholder. The new administration put the club's finances in order, maintained their full support for Dušan Bajević and completed three major signings. The last season's European champion with Red Star Belgrade, Refik Šabanadžović, the international striker of Aris, Vasilis Dimitriadis and the top scorer of last season's second division from Veria, Alexis Alexandris arrived at the club. Furthermore, on 7 September, "AEK Stadium" was renamed into "Nikos Goumas Stadium", after the former president of the club, who had a significant financial contribution in various phases of its construction.

Bajević built a squad that dominated the league almost from the beginning. In the end, AEK produced consistent performances, while from time to time they also produced entertaining football and won the title by three points over the second Olympiacos. The ten consecutive wins until the penultimate matchday proved decisive in securing the title. Thus, in the final matchday at Toumba Stadium, about 6,000 supporters of AEK attended the awarding ceremony of the Championship trophy to their team. Their biggest wins of the season were a 6–0 against Panionios, a 5–1 against Panachaiki at home, while they also won Doxa Drama by 1–5 away from home. Furthermore, the yellow-blacks won the title despite failing to win a single derby against both Panathinaikos and Olympiacos.

In the UEFA Cup, AEK were drawn for the first round against the Albanian Vllaznia Shkodër. Thus, in September they traveled to Shkodër, where Vllaznia surprised the yellow-blacks, putting a lot of pressure on from the beginning. However, as the minutes went by and the initial excitement of the Albanians wore out, AEK leveled the game and took the away victory with a goal by Dimitriadis. The rematch at Nikos Goumas Stadium was little more than a formality and the tie was effectively settled early, with a quick goal by Papaioannou and eventually they won 2–0. The draw for the second round brought them against Aleksandr Mostovoi's and Valery Karpin's Spartak Moscow. In the freezing Luzhniki Stadium they earned a goalless draw against Oleg Romanchev's squad. In Athens, the Russians took the lead in the first quarter with a penalty by Mostovoi and the qualification appeared all but lost. However, with remarkable determination and with the crowd that overwhelmed the stadium, AEK managed to turn the game around in the last half hour. The atmosphere inspired the team and at the 64th minute Batista leveled the score while 11 minutes later, Dimitriadis gave AEK the lead. In the minutes that followed, the Russians put heavy pressure on AEK and missed many chances to equalize, but the yellow-blacks endured and eventually celebrated the qualification. For the next round, AEK were drawn against Torino. In the first match at home the stadium was buzzing, the team was carried away by the excitement and pinned Toro back in their own half, taking the lead early on with a powerful strike from Batista. AEK continued to attack relentlessly, but were punished by the Italians' first counterattack. The equaliser stunned the hosts and before the team realized it, Torino completed the comeback. For the remainder match AEK dominated the pitch, but the counter-attacking Italians held firm defensively and just conceded an equalizer by Šabanadžović. AEK arrived in Turin for the rematch knowing that their task was inherently difficult. They pressed on and worried Emiliano Mondonico's team, but early in the second half, Toro with a header by Casagrande, secured qualification. Several years later and due to the preliminary investigation into the "Calciopolis" scandal, the then general manager of Torino, Luciano Mozzi, was accused of having also influenced the referees in Toro's European matches of that season, securing favor for the Piedmontese club including the games against AEK.

In the Cup, AEK easily qualified as winners of their group with Doxa Vyronas, EAR, Panachaiki and Aris Nikaias. In the knockout stage, they easily eliminated Ionikos and Iraklis, as well. In the quarter-finals they faced OFI and after a goalless draw in the first match, AEK won in Crete and secured qualification. In the semi-finals, AEK came across PAOK and although in the first leg they at Nea Filadelfeia got an advantage with a 2–0 win, they were eliminated in the extra time at Thessaloniki with a 3–0 defeat.

The team's key players were Manolas in defense, Savevski with Šabanadžović in midfield and Dimitriadis, Batista, Savvidis and Alexandris in the offense. However, the rest of the "starters" also performed at a high level. In his debut season with AEK, Dimitriadis emerged as the top scorer of the league with 28 goals.

At the end of the season Generakis resigned from the presidency of AEK. Immediately after, the business duo of Dimitris Melissanidis and Giannis Karras made an offer for the shares of Zafiropoulos. The major shareholder of AEK who was looking for a buyer, began the necessary procedures, clearing the way for them to begin planning for the following season.

== Management team ==
Position	Staff
Manager	(Socialist Federal Republic of Yugoslavia) Dušan Bajević
Assistant manager	(Greece) Petros Ravousis
Goalkeeping coach	(Greece) Stelios Serafidis
Fitness coach	(Greece) Panagiotis Sechidis
Fitness coach	(Greece) Dimitris Bouroutzikas
Scout	(Greece) Aris Tsachouridis
Head of Medical	(Greece) Lakis Nikolaou

== Players ==
=== Squad information ===
NOTE: The players are the ones that have been announced by the AEK Athens' press release. No edits should be made unless a player arrival or exit is announced. Updated 7 June 1992, 23:59 UTC+3.

Player	Nat.	Position(s)	Date of birth (Age)	Signed	Previous club	Transfer fee	Contract until
Goalkeepers
Antonis Minou (Vice-captain 2)	(Greece)	GK	4 May 1958 (aged 34)	1988	(Greece) Panathinaikos	₯50,000,000	1993
Spyros Ikonomopoulos	(Greece)	GK	25 July 1959 (aged 32)	1979	(Greece) AEK Athens U20	—	1993
Fanis Kofinas	(Greece)	GK	5 September 1960 (aged 31)	1982	(Greece) Pelopas Kiato	Free	1992
Defenders
Makis Chatzis	(Greece)	RB / LB	30 March 1957 (aged 35)	1984	(Greece) Apollon Athens	₯6,750,000	1994
Takis Karagiozopoulos (Vice-captain)	(Greece)	CB / DM / ST	4 February 1961 (aged 31)	1981	(Greece) Veria	₯8,000,000	1993
Stelios Manolas	(Greece)	CB / RB	13 July 1961 (aged 30)	1980	(Greece) AEK Athens U20	—	1993
Christos Vasilopoulos	(Greece)	RB / LB	12 November 1962 (aged 29)	1986	(Greece) Panachaiki	₯8,000,000	1993
Georgios Koutoulas	(Greece)	CB / LB	9 February 1967 (aged 25)	1987	(Greece) AEK Athens U20	—	1993
Vaios Karagiannis	(Greece)	LB / CB	25 June 1968 (aged 24)	1990	(Greece) A.O. Karditsa	₯11,000,000	1996
Georgios Theodoridis	(Greece)	CB	8 July 1973 (aged 18)	1991	(Greece) Doxa Markochori	₯5,700,000	1995
Midfielders
Pavlos Papaioannou	(Greece) (Brazil)	DM / RB / LB / RM	19 May 1959 (aged 33)	1983	(Greece) Rodos	₯10,000,000	1993
Giorgos Savvidis (Captain)	(Cyprus)	RM / AM / RW / SS / ST	8 February 1961 (aged 31)	1987	(Cyprus) Omonia	₯20,940,600	1992
Lampros Georgiadis	(Greece)	LM / AM / LB	11 July 1963 (aged 28)	1986	(Greece) Anagennisi Arta	₯11,000,000	1994
Toni Savevski	(Socialist Federal Republic of Yugoslavia)	CM / LM / DM	14 July 1963 (aged 28)	1988	(Socialist Federal Republic of Yugoslavia) Vardar	₯34,000,000	1993
Jim Patikas	(Australia) (Greece)	RM / LM / RW / LW / SS	18 October 1963 (aged 28)	1985	(Australia) Sydney Croatia	Free	1993
Refik Šabanadžović	(Socialist Federal Republic of Yugoslavia)	DM / CM / CB / RB	2 August 1965 (aged 26)	1991	(Socialist Federal Republic of Yugoslavia) Red Star Belgrade	₯18,700,000	1994
Stavros Stamatis	(Greece)	DM / CM / CB / RB / LB / AM	31 January 1966 (aged 26)	1988	(Greece) Charavgiakos	₯22,000,000	1993
Nikos Ladogiannis	(Greece)	CM	12 June 1972 (aged 20)	1991	(Greece) AEK Athens U20	—	1996
Forwards
Daniel Batista	(Cape Verde) (Netherlands)	ST / SS / AM	9 September 1964 (aged 27)	1989	(Greece) Ethnikos Piraeus	Free	1992
Vasilis Dimitriadis	(Greece)	ST	1 February 1966 (aged 26)	1991	(Greece) Aris	₯95,000,000	1993
Frank Klopas	(United States) (Greece)	SS / ST / AM	1 September 1966 (aged 25)	1988	(United States) Chicago Sting	Free	1993
Alexis Alexandris	(Greece)	ST / RW	21 October 1968 (aged 23)	1991	(Greece) Veria	₯45,000,000	1994
Giorgos Kakousios	(Greece)	ST	16 January 1972 (aged 20)	1991	(Germany) 1. FC Nürnberg II	Free	1994
Left during Winter Transfer Window
Giorgos Peppes	(Greece)	CB	26 October 1961 (aged 30)	1986	(Greece) Ethnikos Piraeus	₯10,000,000	1991
Spyros Goumas	(Greece)	ST	24 February 1970 (aged 22)	1989	(Greece) AEK Athens U20	—	1992

== Transfers ==
=== In ===
==== Summer ====
Pos.	Player	From	Fee	Date	Contract Until	Source
DF	(Greece) Georgios Theodoridis	(Greece) Doxa Markochori	₯5,700,000	6 July 1991	30 June 1995	
MF	(Socialist Federal Republic of Yugoslavia) Refik Šabanadžović	(Socialist Federal Republic of Yugoslavia) Red Star Belgrade	₯18,700,000	15 July 1991	30 June 1994	
MF	(Greece) Nikos Ladogiannis	(Greece) AEK Athens U20	Promotion	1 July 1991	30 June 1996	
FW	(Australia) Dimosthenis Batalis	(Greece) Kallithea	Loan return	1 July 1991	30 November 1991	
FW	(Greece) Vasilis Dimitriadis	(Greece) Aris	₯95,000,000^{[a]}	8 July 1991	30 June 1993	
FW	(Greece) Alexis Alexandris	(Greece) Veria	₯45,000,000	5 July 1991	30 June 1994	
FW	(Greece) Giorgos Kakousios	(Germany) 1. FC Nürnberg II	Free transfer	1 July 1991	30 June 1994	

Notes

a. plus the incomes from their two scheduled friendly games.

=== Out ===
==== Summer ====
Pos.	Player	To	Fee	Date	Source
DF	(Greece) Anastasios Pourikas	(Greece) Kallithea	End of contract	1 July 1991	
MF	(Greece) Giorgos Famelis	(Greece) AO Vouliagmenis	Loan return	1 July 1991	
MF	(Greece) Giorgos Papakostoulis	(Greece) Atromitos	End of contract	1 July 1991	
MF	(Greece) Panagiotis Pangratis	(Greece) Atromitos	End of contract	2 July 1991	
MF	(Poland) Mirosław Okoński	(Greece) Korinthos	Contract termination	11 June 1991	
FW	(Australia) Dimosthenis Batalis	(Greece) Kallithea	Free transfer	1 July 1991	
FW	(Greece) Giannis Milopoulos	(Greece) Paniliakos	Contract termination	6 July 1991	

==== Winter ====
Pos.	Player	To	Fee	Date	Source
DF	(Greece) Giorgos Peppes	(Greece) Ethnikos Piraeus	End of contract	16 December 1991	
FW	(Greece) Spyros Goumas	(Greece) Charavgiakos	Free transfer	1 December 1991	

=== Loan out ===
==== Summer ====
Pos.	Player	To	Fee	Date	Until	Option to buy	Source
FW	(Greece) Georgios Christodoulou	(Cyprus) Pezoporikos	Free	23 August 1991	30 June 1993	✗	

=== Contract renewals ===
Pos.	Player	Date	Former Exp. Date	New Exp. Date	Source
DF	(Greece) Vaios Karagiannis	19 June 1992	30 June 1992	30 June 1996	

=== Overall transfer activity ===
==== Expenditure ====
Summer: ▼ ₯164,400,000

Winter: ▼ ₯0

Total: ▼ ₯164,400,000

==== Income ====
Summer: ▲ ₯0

Winter: ▲ ₯0

Total: ▲ ₯0

==== Net Totals ====
Summer: ▼ ₯164,400,000

Winter: ₯0

Total: ▼ ₯164,400,000

== Pre-season and friendlies ==
20 July 1991 Friendly	Kirchen-Hausen	1–16	AEK Athens
18:00 EEST (UTC+3)	Fritsch 6'	Report	Dimitriadis 11', 20', 30', 41'; Patikas 16'; Alexandris 28', 43'; Manolas 35'; Savvidis 38', 44'; Klopas 50', 77'; Stamatis 55', 86'; Chatzis 57'; Georgiadis 82'
Note: Kirchen-Hausen used players from Disiegen and Buchhausen.

26 July 1991 Friendly	Mulfingen	1–8	AEK Athens	Mulfingen
18:30 EEST (UTC+3)	Goal	Report	Alexandris; Dimitriadis; Šabanadžović; Patikas; Savevski

28 July 1991 Friendly	VfR Stockach	0–4	AEK Athens
18:00 EEST (UTC+3)	(penalty missed) 70'	Report	Batista 26'; Christodoulou 37'; Patikas 80'; Georgiadis 84'

31 July 1991 Friendly	Forst	1–5	AEK Athens
19:00 EEST (UTC+3)	Pachaleren (penalty missed) 13'; Spolien 87'	Report	Georgiadis 10', 37'; Šabanadžović 50'; Batista 67'; Dimitriadis 83'

5 August 1991 Friendly	AEK Athens	2–2	Crystal Palace	Nea Filadelfeia
21:00 EEST (UTC+3)	Dimitriadis 24'; Patikas 90'	Report	Gray 34'; Bright 63'	Stadium: Nikos Goumas Stadium; Attendance: 14,666; Referee: Theodoros Kefalas (Athens)

7 August 1991 Friendly	AEK Athens	2–1	PAOK	Nea Filadelfeia
21:00 EEST (UTC+3)	Manolas 61'; Karagiozopoulos (penalty missed) 72; Antonopoulos 78' (o.g.)	Report	Skartados 19' (pen.)	Stadium: Nikos Goumas Stadium; Attendance: 5,846; Referee: Giannis Iatropoulos (Piraeus)

9 August 1991 Friendly	AEK Athens	1–1	Iraklis	Nea Filadelfeia
21:00 EEST (UTC+3)	Stamatis 20'; Manolas (yellow card) 73'	Report	Kushta 9'; Zifkas (yellow card) 35'	Stadium: Nikos Goumas Stadium; Attendance: 3,331; Referee: Stelios Charlavanis (Euboea)

11 August 1991 Friendly	Paniliakos	2–5	AEK Athens	Pyrgos
18:00 EEST (UTC+3)	Papanikolaou 28'; Grilas 75'	Report	Klopas 10'; Alexandris 39', 56'; Dimitriadis 55'; Georgiadis 88' (pen.)	Stadium: Pyrgos Stadium; Attendance: 3,500; Referee: Georgakopoulos

14 August 1991 Friendly	AEK Athens	2–1	Aris	Nea Filadelfeia
21:00 EEST (UTC+3)	Alexandris 46'; Bougiouklis 74' (o.g.)	Report	Tsimpos (yellow card); Ignatov 61'	Stadium: Nikos Goumas Stadium; Attendance: 3,055; Referee: Babis Rigas (Athens)
Note: Friendly match as part of the transfer of Vasilis Dimitriadis.

22 August 1991 Friendly	Aris	2–2	AEK Athens	Thessaloniki
21:30 EEST (UTC+3)	Mitsopoulos 1', 65'	Report	Dimitriadis 11'; Savevski 67'	Stadium: Aris Stadium; Attendance: 3,000; Referee: Alekos Arnakis (Thessaloniki)
Note: Friendly match as part of the transfer of Vasilis Dimitriadis.

28 May 1992 Friendly	Vouliagmeni	1–1	AEK Athens	Vouliagmeni
15:30 EEST (UTC+3)	Spyropoulos 28'	Report	Giannakopoulos 88'	Stadium: Vouliagmeni Stadium

4 June 1992 Friendly	AEK Athens	12–1	Melissia	Nea Filadelfeia
17:30 EEST (UTC+3)	Dimitriadis; Papaioannou; Šabanadžović; Patikas; Karagiozopoulos; Kakousios; Georgiadis (pen.); Paço	Report	Tsikoulis	Stadium: Nikos Goumas Stadium

== Competitions ==
=== Overall record ===
Competition	First match	Last match	Starting round	Final position	Record							
Competition	First match	Last match	Starting round	Final position	Pld	W	D	L	GF	GA	GD	Win %
Alpha Ethniki	1 September 1991	7 June 1992	Matchday 1	Winners	34	23	8	3	72	25	+47	67.65
Greek Cup	18 August 1991	29 April 1992	Group Stage	Semi-finals	12	7	4	1	21	9	+12	58.33
UEFA Cup	18 September 1991	11 December 1991	First round	Third round	6	3	2	1	7	4	+3	50.00
Total					52	33	14	5	100	38	+62	63.46

Last updated: 7 June 1992
Source: Competitions

=== Alpha Ethniki ===
==== League table ====
Pos	Team	Pld	W	D	L	GF	GA	GD	Pts	Qualification or relegation
1	AEK Athens (C)	34	23	8	3	72	25	+47	54	Qualification for Champions League first round
2	Olympiacos	34	20	11	3	74	30	+44	51	Qualification for Cup Winners' Cup first round
3	Panathinaikos	34	21	6	7	66	21	+45	48	Qualification for UEFA Cup first round
4	PAOK	34	13	13	8	44	44	0	39	Qualification for UEFA Cup first round
5	Apollon Athens	34	14	7	13	35	34	+1	35	

Source: RSSSF
Rules for classification: 1st points; 2nd head-to-head points; 3rd head-to-head goal difference; 4th decision match.
(C) Champions

==== Results summary ====
Overall								Home						Away					
Pld	W	D	L	GF	GA	GD	Pts	W	D	L	GF	GA	GD	W	D	L	GF	GA	GD
34	23	8	3	72	25	+47	54	13	4	0	42	8	+34	10	4	3	30	17	+13

Source: Competitive matches

==== Results by Matchday ====
Round	1	2	3	4	5	6	7	8	9	10	11	12	13	14	15	16	17	18	19	20	21	22	23	24	25	26	27	28	29	30	31	32	33	34
Ground	A	H	H	A	H	A	H	A	H	A	A	A	H	A	H	A	H	H	A	A	H	A	H	A	H	A	H	H	H	A	H	A	H	A
Result	L	D	W	D	W	W	W	W	W	W	L	W	D	D	W	W	W	D	L	W	W	D	D	W	W	W	W	W	W	W	W	W	W	D
Position	14	15	12	9	7	4	3	2	1	1	3	2	3	5	3	1	1	1	1	1	1	1	2	2	2	1	1	1	1	1	1	1	1	1

Source: Competitive matches
A = Away; H = Home; W = Win; D = Draw; L = Loss; P = Postponed

==== Matches ====
1 September 1991 1	Olympiacos	4–2	AEK Athens	Piraeus
17:00 EEST (UTC+3)	Mitropoulos (yellow card); Pachatouridis (yellow card); Lytovchenko (yellow card); Tsiantakis 4'; Protasov 17', 31', 34', (penalty missed) 34'		Peppes (yellow card); Savevski 43' (pen.); Dimitriadis 52'	Stadium: Karaiskakis Stadium; Attendance: 30,248; Referee: Stavros Zakestidis (Thessaloniki)

8 September 1991 2	AEK Athens	0–0	Panathinaikos	Nea Filadelfeia
17:00 EEST (UTC+3)	Karagiannis (yellow card); Batista (yellow card); Papaioannou (yellow card)		Apostolakis (yellow card); Kalantzis (yellow card)	Stadium: Nikos Goumas Stadium; Attendance: 25,639; Referee: Stavros Zakestidis (Thessaloniki)

15 September 1991 3	AEK Athens	2–1	Korinthos	Nea Filadelfeia
17:00 EEST (UTC+3)	Karagiannis (yellow card); Dimitriadis 58', 79'		Mandonis (yellow card); Dimopoulos (yellow card); Okoński 81'	Stadium: Nikos Goumas Stadium; Attendance: 12,477; Referee: Ilias Doutsias (Piraeus)

22 September 1991 4	Aris	0–0	AEK Athens	Thessaloniki
17:00 EEST (UTC+3)	Limniatis (yellow card); Tsimpos (yellow card); Kolomitrousis (yellow card)		Batista (yellow card); Vasilopoulos (yellow card); Klopas (yellow card); Papaioannou (yellow card) 25'	Stadium: Aris Stadium; Attendance: 12,790; Referee: Stavros Zakestidis (Thessaloniki)

29 September 1991 5	AEK Athens	3–0	Ethnikos Piraeus	Nea Filadelfeia
16:00 EEST (UTC+3)	Manolas (yellow card); Savvidis 31'; Alexandris 64' (pen.); Savevski 81'		Setinov (yellow card); Kiougioumtzoglou (yellow card); Chortsas (yellow card)	Stadium: Nikos Goumas Stadium; Attendance: 11,884; Referee: Vasilis Stamoulis (Rethymno)

12 October 1991 6	Athinaikos	2–3	AEK Athens	Vyronas
15:30 EEST (UTC+3)	Bong 59' (pen.); Kapouranis 85'		Savevski (yellow card); Batista 8', (yellow card); Dimitriadis 15', 52' (pen.)	Stadium: Vyronas National Stadium; Attendance: 3,506; Referee: Gerasimos Mazarakis (Kefalonia)

19 October 1991 7	AEK Athens	2–0	Pierikos	Nea Filadelfeia
16:00 EEST (UTC+3)	Dimitriadis 10' (pen.); Alexandris 85'			Stadium: Nikos Goumas Stadium; Attendance: 3,256; Referee: Tasos Lefakis (Chania)

3 November 1991 8	AEL	0–2	AEK Athens	Larissa
15:00 EET (UTC+2)			Manolas 50'; Batista (yellow card) 53', (goal) 81'	Stadium: Alcazar Stadium; Attendance: 10,019; Referee: Thanasis Zachariadis (Thessaloniki)

10 November 1991 9	AEK Athens	2–0	Iraklis	Nea Filadelfeia
15:00 EET (UTC+2)	Karagiannis (yellow card) 19'; Manolas (yellow card) 68'; Savvidis 54'; Dimitriadis 55'		Dimopoulos (yellow card) 21'; D. Papadopoulos (yellow card) 36'; Kushta (yellow card)	Stadium: Nikos Goumas Stadium; Attendance: 15,523; Referee: Giorgos Giannopoulos (Athens)

23 November 1991 10	Panachaiki	2–3	AEK Athens	Patras
15:00 EET (UTC+2)	Mikes 26'; Ottiji 38', (yellow card) 44'; Ferko (yellow card) 44' (yellow-red card) 45'		Georgiadis (yellow card); Dimitriadis 2'; Koutoulas (yellow card) 44'; Šabanadžović 64'; Batista 55'	Stadium: Panachaiki Stadium; Attendance: 3,381; Referee: Christos Savvas (Kozani)

8 December 1991 11	OFI	2–1	AEK Athens	Heraklion
14:45 EET (UTC+2)	Marinakis (yellow card); Samaras 30'; Goulis 44' (pen.)		Batista 47'	Stadium: Theodoros Vardinogiannis Stadium; Attendance: 3,218; Referee: Giorgos Bikas (Chalkidiki)

15 December 1991 12	Panionios	0–1	AEK Athens	Nea Smyrni
14:45 EET (UTC+2)	Grigoriou (yellow card); Mantzios (yellow card); Barbalias (yellow card) 84'		Savevski (yellow card); Minou (yellow card); Karagiozopoulos 83' (pen.), (yellow card)	Stadium: Nea Smyrni Stadium; Attendance: 10,528; Referee: Gerasimos Mazarakis (Kefalonia)

29 December 1991 13	AEK Athens	1–1	Doxa Drama	Nea Filadelfeia
14:45 EET (UTC+2)	Batista 50'		Vasilakakis (yellow card); Papadopoulos (yellow card) 7'; Iordanidis 52'	Stadium: Nikos Goumas Stadium; Attendance: 6,490; Referee: Giannis Papageorgiou (Athens)

5 January 1992 14	Skoda Xanthi	0–0	AEK Athens	Xanthi
14:45 EET (UTC+2)	Kechagias (yellow card); Karypidis (yellow card)		Karagiannis (yellow card); Papaioannou (yellow card)	Stadium: A.O. Xanthi Stadium; Attendance: 8,998; Referee: Alekos Katsikogiannis (Epirus)

12 January 1992 15	AEK Athens	2–1	Panserraikos	Nea Filadelfeia
14:45 EET (UTC+2)	Dimitriadis 47'; Savvidis 64'		Chatzikamaris (yellow card); Aivazidis (yellow card); Vatmanidis (yellow card); Petrunov 78'	Stadium: Nikos Goumas Stadium; Attendance: 10,525; Referee: Periklis Vasilakis (Athens)

18 January 1992 16	Apollon Athens	0–2	AEK Athens	Rizoupoli
14:45 EET (UTC+2)	Roussos (yellow card); Kolitsidakis (yellow card); Papadakis (yellow card)		Šabanadžović (yellow card); Savevski (yellow card); Savvidis 16'; Dimitriadis 88', (yellow card)	Stadium: Rizoupoli Stadium; Attendance: 6,427; Referee: Sotiris Vorgias (Athens)

25 January 1992 17	AEK Athens	3–1	PAOK	Nea Filadelfeia
14:30 EET (UTC+2)	Manolas (yellow card); Dimitriadis 28', (penalty missed) 70, (yellow card); Savvidis 73'; Klopas 81'		Malioufas (yellow card); Alexiou (yellow card); Anastasiadis (yellow card); Đurđević 86'	Stadium: Nikos Goumas Stadium; Attendance: 9,562; Referee: Giorgos Koukoulas (Lesbos)

2 February 1992 18	AEK Athens	1–1	Olympiacos	Nea Filadelfeia
14:45 EET (UTC+2)	Dimitriadis 44'; Manolas (yellow card) 74'; Klopas (yellow card) 75'		Tsalouchidis 38'; Pachatouridis (yellow card) 57'	Stadium: Nikos Goumas Stadium; Attendance: 20,145; Referee: Sotiris Vorgias (Athens)

9 February 1992 19	Panathinaikos	2–0	AEK Athens	Marousi
14:45 EET (UTC+2)	Kalitzakis (yellow card); Saravakos 26', 28'		Karagiannis (yellow card); Batista (yellow card); Papaioannou (yellow card)	Stadium: Olympic Stadium; Attendance: 40,882; Referee: Kostas Dimitriadis (Piraeus)

16 February 1992 20	Korinthos	1–2	AEK Athens	Corinth
15:15 EET (UTC+2)	Koulouris 5'; Bardis (yellow card) 24'; Perachoritis (yellow card) 29'; Monos (yellow card) 53'; Chatziathanasiou (yellow card) 66'; Chormis (yellow card) 84'		Monos 3' (o.g.); Klopas (yellow card) 21'; Papaioannou (yellow card) 43'; Dimitriadis (yellow card) 64'; Alexandris 89'	Stadium: Korinthos Stadium; Attendance: 7,744; Referee: Christos Zarzavatsakis (Athens)

24 February 1992 21	AEK Athens	3–1	Aris	Nea Filadelfeia
15:15 EET (UTC+2)	Alexandris 34', 45+1' (pen.); Stamatis 72'		Shalamanov 21', (yellow card) 60'; Mitsopoulos (yellow card) 45'; Tsimpos (yellow card) 85'	Stadium: Nikos Goumas Stadium; Attendance: 5,711; Referee: Kostas Dimitriadis (Piraeus)
Note: The game was scheduled for 23 of February, but due to the heavy snowfall in Athens and the inappropriateness of the Nikos Goumas Stadium, the game was postponed for the next day.

1 March 1992 22	Ethnikos Piraeus	1–1	AEK Athens	Piraeus
15:15 EET (UTC+2)	N. Manolas (yellow card) 40'; Kamitsis 45+1'; Chortsas (yellow card) 48'; Tsiplakis (yellow card) 51'		Alexandris 76'	Stadium: Karaiskakis Stadium; Attendance: 16,496; Referee: Alexandros Naziris (Thessaloniki)

8 March 1992 23	AEK Athens	0–0	Athinaikos	Nea Filadelfeia
15:15 EET (UTC+2)	Batista (yellow card) 35'; Bong (yellow card) 44'		Boutzoukas (yellow card) 28'	Stadium: Nikos Goumas Stadium; Attendance: 8,960; Referee: Theodoros Kefalas (Athens)

15 March 1992 24	Pierikos	0–1	AEK Athens	Katerini
15:15 EET (UTC+2)	Konstantinidis (yellow card) 21'; Randjelović (yellow card) 73'		Patikas (yellow card) 14'; Dimitriadis 25'	Stadium: Katerini Municipal Stadium; Attendance: 4,624; Referee: Alexandros Naziris (Thessaloniki)

22 March 1992 25	AEK Athens	3–0	AEL	Nea Filadelfeia
15:15 EET (UTC+2)	Alexandris 39'; Manolas 54'; Batista 71'			Stadium: Nikos Goumas Stadium; Attendance: 13,238; Referee: Giannis Papageorgiou (Athens)

28 March 1992 26	Iraklis	0–3	AEK Athens	Thessaloniki
15:30 EET (UTC+2)	G. Papadopoulos (yellow card) 47'		Alexandris 30', 44'; Šabanadžović (yellow card) 57'; Batista 83'	Stadium: Kaftanzoglio Stadium; Attendance: 2,500; Referee: Alekos Katsikogiannis (Epirus)

12 April 1992 27	AEK Athens	5–1	Panachaiki	Nea Filadelfeia
16:30 EEST (UTC+3)	Karagiannis (yellow card); Dimitriadis 39' (pen.), 44', 58'; Savvidis 67', 90'		Pias (yellow card); Genas (yellow card); Kyriakopoulos 34'	Stadium: Nikos Goumas Stadium; Attendance: 11,529; Referee: Giorgos Giannopoulos (Athens)

19 April 1992 28	AEK Athens	3–0	OFI	Nea Filadelfeia
16:30 EEST (UTC+3)	Batista 13'; Alexandris 53'; Dimitriadis 55'		Andreanidis (yellow card); Pavlopoulos (yellow card) 43' (yellow-red card) 62'	Stadium: Nikos Goumas Stadium; Attendance: 20,137; Referee: Giannis Latsios (Larissa)

3 May 1992 29	AEK Athens	6–0	Panionios	Nea Filadelfeia
16:30 EEST (UTC+3)	Savvidis 8', 24'; Dimitriadis 18' (pen.), 49', 68'; Batista 50'		Vermezović (yellow card)	Stadium: Nikos Goumas Stadium; Attendance: 10,720; Referee: Dimitris Bentas (Trikala)

9 May 1992 30	Doxa Drama	1–5	AEK Athens	Drama
17:00 EEST (UTC+3)	Aleksić (yellow card); G. Georgiadis (yellow card); Stefanidis (yellow card); Nikodijević 16'		Alexandris 14', 66'; Manolas 30'; Dimitriadis 42', 72'	Stadium: Doxa Drama Stadium; Attendance: 5,229; Referee: Stratos Kannos (Athens)

17 May 1992 31	AEK Athens	4–1	Skoda Xanthi	Nea Filadelfeia
17:00 EEST (UTC+3)	Stamatis (yellow card); Savevski 20'; Batista 51'; Alexandris 70'; Dimitriadis 87'		Karypidis 89'	Stadium: Nikos Goumas Stadium; Attendance: 20,305; Referee: Markos Zabetakis (Thessaloniki)

24 May 1992 32	Panserraikos	0–2	AEK Athens	Serres
17:00 EEST (UTC+3)	Aivazidis (yellow card) 20'; Iosifidis (yellow card) 80'		Dimitriadis (yellow card); Manolas 7'; Stamatis 18'; Šabanadžović (yellow card) 25' (yellow-red card) 90+1'	Stadium: Serres Municipal Stadium; Attendance: 8,292; Referee: Giannis Dermetzoglou (Alexandroupoli)

31 May 1992 33	AEK Athens	2–0	Apollon Athens	Nea Filadelfeia
17:00 EEST (UTC+3)	Vasilopoulos 8', (yellow card); Dimitriadis 74' (pen.)		Pozapalidis (yellow card); Velentzas (yellow card); Apostolou (yellow card) 73'	Stadium: Nikos Goumas Stadium; Attendance: 22,083; Referee: Kostas Dimitriadis (Piraeus)

7 June 1992 34	PAOK	2–2	AEK Athens	Thessaloniki
17:00 EEST (UTC+3)	Malioufas (yellow card) 39'; Lagonidis (yellow card) 50'; Toursounidis 71'; Lagonidis 84'		Dimitriadis 65', 77'; Šabanadžović (yellow card) 72'	Stadium: Toumba Stadium; Attendance: 6,184; Referee: Giorgos Bikas (Chalkidiki)

=== Greek Cup ===
==== Group 6 ====
Pos	Team	Pld	W	D	L	GF	GA	GD	Pts	Qualification	AEK	DXV	EAR	PNA	ARN
1	AEK Athens	4	2	2	0	8	3	+5	6	Round of 32		—	—	4–2	3–0
2	Doxa Vyronas	4	2	1	1	8	5	+3	5	Round of 32	0–0		3–2	—	—
3	EAR	4	2	1	1	7	5	+2	5		1–1	—		2–0	—
4	Panachaiki	4	2	0	2	9	7	+2	4		—	2–1	—		5–0
5	Aris Nikaias	4	0	0	4	2	14	−12	0		—	1–4	1–2	—	

Source: epo.gr

==== Matches ====
18 August 1991 1	AEK Athens	3–0	Aris Nikaias	Nea Filadelfeia
21:00 EEST (UTC+3)	Dimitriadis (yellow card); Klopas 7'; Savevski 56'; Batista 82'	Report	Vaziourakis (yellow card); Kokalas (yellow card)	Stadium: Nikos Goumas Stadium; Referee: Giorgos Koukoulas (Lesbos)

25 August 1991 2	Doxa Vyronas	0–0	AEK Athens	Vyronas
21:00 EEST (UTC+3)	Karamichalos (yellow card); Giatsos (yellow card)		Karagiannis (yellow card)	Stadium: Vyronas National Stadium; Referee: Tasos Lefakis (Chania)

28 August 1991 3	AEK Athens	4–2	Panachaiki	Nea Filadelfeia
17:30 EEST (UTC+3)	Manolas 3', 55'; Batista 36', 90'	Report	Drakopoulos 40', (yellow card); Ali 45'	Stadium: Nikos Goumas Stadium; Attendance: 12,000; Referee: Ilias Doutsias (Piraeus)

11 September 1991 4	EAR	1–1	AEK Athens	Rethymno
17:00 EEST (UTC+3)	Vasiliou (yellow card); Pittas 35' (pen.)	Report	Koutoulas 39'	Stadium: Sochora Stadium; Attendance: 5,000; Referee: Kostas Dimitriadis (Piraeus)

===== Round of 32 =====
8 January 1992 First leg	Ionikos	0–2	AEK Athens	Nikaia
14:45 EET (UTC+2)	Oistabasidis (yellow card) 65'	Report	Alexandris 8'; Dimitriadis (yellow card) 29', (goal) 70'; Šabanadžović (yellow card) 72'	Stadium: Neapoli Municipal Stadium; Referee: Giorgos Bikas (Chalkidiki)

22 January 1992 Second leg	AEK Athens	2–1 (4–1 agg.)	Ionikos	Nea Filadelfeia
14:15 EET (UTC+2)	Klopas 29'; Alexandris 35'	Report	Vrachamis (yellow card); Mosimane 68'	Stadium: Nikos Goumas Stadium; Attendance: 1,094; Referee: Theodoros Kefalas (Athens)

===== Round of 16 =====
5 February 1992 First leg	Iraklis	1–1	AEK Athens	Thessaloniki
14:45 EET (UTC+2)	Mallios 90+1'	Report	Alexandris 65'	Stadium: Kaftanzoglio Stadium; Attendance: 5,821; Referee: Kostas Adamopoulos (Athens)

4 March 1992 Second leg	AEK Athens	4–0 (5–1 agg.)	Iraklis	Nea Filadelfeia
15:00 EET (UTC+2)	Vasilopoulos (yellow card) 39'; Alexandris 63' (pen.); Batista 67'; Patikas 78'; Šabanadžović 84'	Report	Erak (yellow card) 22'; Tsourelas (yellow card) 35'; Dimopoulos (yellow card) 42'; G. Papadopoulos (yellow card) 57'; Jovanović (yellow card) 65'	Stadium: Nikos Goumas Stadium; Referee: Periklis Vasilakis (Athens)

===== Quarter-finals =====
11 March 1992 First leg	AEK Athens	0–0	OFI	Nea Filadelfeia
16:00 EET (UTC+2)	Aposporis (yellow card); Goulis (yellow card)	Report	Papaioannou (yellow card)	Stadium: Nikos Goumas Stadium; Referee: Ilias Doutsias (Piraeus)

1 April 1992 Second leg	OFI	1–2 (1–2 agg.)	AEK Athens	Heraklion
16:00 EEST (UTC+3)	Aposporis (yellow card) 55' (yellow-red card) 56'; Papavasiliou 87'	Report	Alexandris 55' (pen.); Savevski 90'	Stadium: Theodoros Vardinogiannis Stadium; Attendance: 10,076; Referee: Dimitris Bentas (Trikala)

===== Semi-finals =====
15 April 1992 First leg	AEK Athens	2–0	PAOK	Nea Filadelfeia
17:00 EEST (UTC+3)	Šabanadžović (yellow card); Alexandris 7'; Manolas 69'	Report	Toursounidis (yellow card); Anastasiadis (yellow card)	Stadium: Nikos Goumas Stadium; Attendance: 15,153; Referee: Alexandros Naziris (Thessaloniki)

29 April 1992 Second leg	PAOK	3–0 (a.e.t.) (3–2 agg.)	AEK Athens	Thessaloniki
16:45 EEST (UTC+3)	Đurđević 16'; Leontiadis (yellow card) 19'; Mitsibonas (yellow card) 40'; Alexiou 57', 103'; Plitsis (yellow card) 91'; Toursounidis (yellow card) 114'	Report	Karagiannis (yellow card) 22'; Vasilopoulos (yellow card) 36'; Minou (yellow card) 64'; Patikas (yellow card) 82'	Stadium: Toumba Stadium; Attendance: 21,388; Referee: Alekos Arnakis (Thessaloniki)

=== UEFA Cup ===
==== First round ====
18 September 1991 First leg	Vllaznia Shkodër (Albania)	0–1	(Greece) AEK Athens	Shkodër, Albania
17:30 EEST (UTC+3)	Shpuza (red card) 45'	Report	Dimitriadis 4'; Vasilopoulos (yellow card) 41'	Stadium: Loro Boriçi Stadium; Attendance: 6,000; Referee: Frans Van Den Wijngaert (Belgium)

3 October 1991 Second leg	AEK Athens (Greece)	2–0 (3–0 agg.)	(Albania) Vllaznia Shkodër	Athens, Greece
21:00 EEST (UTC+3)	Papaioannou 8'; Batista 89'	Report	Bushati (yellow card) 40'	Stadium: Nikos Goumas Stadium; Attendance: 13,519; Referee: Ray Lewis (England)

==== Second round ====
23 October 1991 First leg	Spartak Moscow (Soviet Union)	0–0	(Greece) AEK Athens	Moscow, Soviet Union
19:00 EEST (UTC+3)	Cherenkov (red card) 69'; Mokh (yellow card) 79'	Report	Alexandris (yellow card) 75'	Stadium: Central Lenin Stadium; Attendance: 17,000; Referee: Lajos Hartmann (Hungary)

6 November 1991 Second leg	AEK Athens (Greece)	2–1 (2–1 agg.)	(Soviet Union) Spartak Moscow	Athens, Greece
18:00 EET (UTC+2)	Vasilopoulos (yellow card) 10'; Minou (yellow card) 34'; Karagiannis (yellow card) 38'; Batista 64'; Dimitriadis 74'	Report	Mokh (yellow card) 4'; Gradilenko (yellow card) 19'; Mostovoi 35' (pen.)	Stadium: Nikos Goumas Stadium; Attendance: 30,000; Referee: Antonio Martín Navarrete (Spain)

==== Third round ====
27 November 1991 First leg	AEK Athens (Greece)	2–2	(Italy) Torino	Athens, Greece
19:00 EET (UTC+2)	Karagiannis (yellow card) 38'; Batista 21'; Karagiozopoulos (yellow card) 48'; Šabanadžović 72'	Report	Fusi (yellow card) 20'; Casagrande 33'; Bresciani 36', (yellow card) 83'; Policano (yellow card) 75'	Stadium: Nikos Goumas Stadium; Attendance: 29,000; Referee: Aron Schmidhuber (Germany)

11 December 1991 Second leg	Torino (Italy)	1–0 (3–2 agg.)	(Greece) AEK Athens	Turin, Italy
19:30 EET (UTC+2)	Casagrande 54'; Cravero (yellow card) 82'	Report	Karagiozopoulos (yellow card) 1'	Stadium: Stadio delle Alpi; Attendance: 35,000; Referee: Guy Goethals (Belgium)

== Statistics ==
=== Squad statistics ===
As of 7 June 1992

No.	Pos	Player	Alpha Ethniki		Greek Cup		UEFA Cup		Total	
No.	Pos	Player	Apps	Goals	Apps	Goals	Apps	Goals	Apps	Goals
Goalkeepers
—	GK	(Greece) Antonis Minou	33	0	12	0	6	0	51	0
—	GK	(Greece) Spyros Ikonomopoulos	0	0	0	0	0	0	0	0
—	GK	(Greece) Fanis Kofinas	2	0	0	0	0	0	2	0
Defenders
—	DF	(Greece) Makis Chatzis	1	0	0	0	0	0	1	0
—	DF	(Greece) Takis Karagiozopoulos	13	1	7	0	2	0	22	1
—	DF	(Greece) Stelios Manolas	31	4	12	3	4	0	47	7
—	DF	(Greece) Christos Vasilopoulos	28	1	8	0	5	0	41	1
—	DF	(Greece) Georgios Koutoulas	18	0	9	1	5	0	32	1
—	DF	(Greece) Vaios Karagiannis	30	0	12	0	6	0	48	0
—	DF	(Greece) Georgios Theodoridis	1	0	2	0	0	0	3	0
Midfielders
—	MF	(Greece) Pavlos Papaioannou	32	0	9	0	6	1	47	1
—	MF	(Cyprus) Giorgos Savvidis	33	9	10	0	4	0	47	9
—	MF	(Greece) Lampros Georgiadis	4	0	1	0	2	0	7	0
—	MF	(Socialist Federal Republic of Yugoslavia) Toni Savevski	29	3	8	2	6	0	43	5
—	MF	(Australia) Jim Patikas	20	0	9	1	2	0	31	1
—	MF	(Socialist Federal Republic of Yugoslavia) Refik Šabanadžović	31	1	10	1	6	1	47	3
—	MF	(Greece) Stavros Stamatis	21	2	7	0	6	0	34	2
—	MF	(Greece) Nikos Ladogiannis	0	0	0	0	0	0	0	0
Forwards
—	FW	(Cape Verde) Daniel Batista	30	10	11	4	5	3	46	17
—	FW	(Greece) Vasilis Dimitriadis	34	28	10	1	5	2	49	31
—	FW	(United States) Frank Klopas	13	1	5	2	1	0	19	3
—	FW	(Greece) Alexis Alexandris	26	11	12	6	6	0	44	17
—	FW	(Greece) Giorgos Kakousios	1	0	1	0	0	0	2	0
Left during Winter Transfer Window
—	DF	(Greece) Giorgos Peppes	1	0	0	0	0	0	1	0
—	FW	(Greece) Spyros Goumas	0	0	0	0	0	0	0	0

=== Goalscorers ===
As of 7 June 1992
The list is sorted by competition order when total goals are equal, then by position and then alphabetically by surname.

Rank	Pos.	Player	Alpha Ethniki	Greek Cup	UEFA Cup	Total
1	FW	(Greece) Vasilis Dimitriadis	28	1	2	31
2	FW	(Greece) Alexis Alexandris	11	6	0	17
2	FW	(Cape Verde) Daniel Batista	10	4	3	17
4	MF	(Cyprus) Giorgos Savvidis	9	0	0	9
5	DF	(Greece) Stelios Manolas	4	3	0	7
6	MF	(Socialist Federal Republic of Yugoslavia) Toni Savevski	3	2	0	5
7	FW	(United States) Frank Klopas	1	2	0	3
7	MF	(Socialist Federal Republic of Yugoslavia) Refik Šabanadžović	1	1	1	3
9	MF	(Greece) Stavros Stamatis	2	0	0	2
10	DF	(Greece) Takis Karagiozopoulos	1	0	0	1
10	DF	(Greece) Christos Vasilopoulos	1	0	0	1
10	DF	(Greece) Georgios Koutoulas	0	1	0	1
10	MF	(Australia) Jim Patikas	0	1	0	1
10	MF	(Greece) Pavlos Papaioannou	0	0	1	1
Own goals			1	0	0	1
Totals			72	21	7	100

=== Hat-tricks ===
Numbers in superscript represent the goals that the player scored.

Player	Against	Result	Date	Competition	Source
(Greece) Vasilis Dimitriadis	(Greece) Panachaiki	5–1 (H)	12 April 1992	Alpha Ethniki	
(Greece) Vasilis Dimitriadis	(Greece) Panionios	6–0 (H)	3 May 1992	Alpha Ethniki	

=== Clean sheets ===
As of 7 June 1992
The list is sorted by competition order when total clean sheets are equal and then alphabetically by surname. Clean sheets in games where both goalkeepers participated are awarded to the goalkeeper who started the game. Goalkeepers with no appearances are not included.

Rank	Player	Alpha Ethniki	Greek Cup	UEFA Cup	Total
1	(Greece) Antonis Minou	17	6	3	26
2	(Greece) Fanis Kofinas	0	0	0	0
Totals		17	6	3	26

=== Disciplinary record ===
As of 7 June 1992

N	P	Nat.	Name	Alpha Ethniki			Greek Cup			UEFA Cup			Total			Notes
N	P	Nat.	Name	Yellow card	Second yellow card	Red card	Yellow card	Second yellow card	Red card	Yellow card	Second yellow card	Red card	Yellow card	Second yellow card	Red card	Notes
Goalkeepers
—	GK	(Greece)	Antonis Minou	1			1			1			3			
—	GK	(Greece)	Spyros Ikonomopoulos													
—	GK	(Greece)	Fanis Kofinas													
Defenders
—	DF	(Greece)	Makis Chatzis													
—	DF	(Greece)	Takis Karagiozopoulos	1						2			3			
—	DF	(Greece)	Stelios Manolas	4									4			
—	DF	(Greece)	Christos Vasilopoulos	2			2			2			6			
—	DF	(Greece)	Georgios Koutoulas	1									1			
—	DF	(Greece)	Vaios Karagiannis	6			2			1			9			
—	DF	(Greece)	Georgios Theodoridis													
Midfielders
—	MF	(Greece)	Pavlos Papaioannou	5			1						6			
—	MF	(Cyprus)	Giorgos Savvidis													
—	MF	(Greece)	Lampros Georgiadis	1									1			
—	MF	(Socialist Federal Republic of Yugoslavia)	Toni Savevski	3									3			
—	MF	(Australia)	Jim Patikas	1			1						2			
—	MF	(Socialist Federal Republic of Yugoslavia)	Refik Šabanadžović	5	1		2						7	1		
—	MF	(Greece)	Stavros Stamatis	1									1			
—	MF	(Greece)	Nikos Ladogiannis													
Forwards
—	FW	(Cape Verde)	Daniel Batista	6									6			
—	FW	(Greece)	Vasilis Dimitriadis	4			2						6			
—	FW	(United States)	Frank Klopas	3									3			
—	FW	(Greece)	Alexis Alexandris							1			1			
—	FW	(Greece)	Giorgos Kakousios													
Left during Winter Transfer Window
—	DF	(Greece)	Giorgos Peppes	1									1			
—	FW	(Greece)	Spyros Goumas													

=== Starting 11 ===
This section presents the most frequently used formation along with the players with the most starts across all competitions.

N.	Formation	Matchday(s)
47	3–4–3	1–5, 7–23, 25–34
5	4–3–3	6, 11, 24

Nat.	Player	Pos.
(Greece)	Antonis Minou	GK
(Greece)	Christos Vasilopoulos	RCB
(Greece)	Stelios Manolas	CB
(Greece)	Vaios Karagiannis	LCB
(Greece)	Pavlos Papaioannou	RDM
(Socialist Federal Republic of Yugoslavia)	Refik Šabanadžović	LDM
(Cyprus)	Giorgos Savvidis (C)	RM
(Socialist Federal Republic of Yugoslavia)	Toni Savevski	LM
(Greece)	Alexis Alexandris	RW
(Cape Verde)	Daniel Batista	LW
(Greece)	Vasilis Dimitriadis	CF

Last updated: 1992-06-07

== Awards ==
Player	Pos.	Award	Source
(Greece) Vasilis Dimitriadis	FW	Alpha Ethniki Top Scorer	
(Socialist Federal Republic of Yugoslavia) Toni Savevski	MF	Foreign Player of the Season	
(Socialist Federal Republic of Yugoslavia) Dušan Bajević	—	Foreign Manager of the Season	
