= Michalis =

Michalis (Μιχάλης) is a Greek masculine given name.

== People with the name ==
- Michalis Agrimakis (born 1992), Greek footballer
- Michalis Alexandropoulos (born 1972), retired Greek male indoor volleyball and beach volleyball player
- Michalis Arkadis, Greek football club president
- Michalis Attalides, Cypriot academic, former civil servant and diplomat
- Michalis Avgenikou (born 1993), Greek footballer
- Michalis Bakakis (born 1991), Greek footballer
- Michalis Bastakos (born 1996), Greek footballer
- Michalis Boukouvalas (born 1988), Greek footballer
- Michalis Bousis (born 1999), Cypriot footballer
- Michalis Charalambous (born 1999), Cypriot footballer
- Michalis Chatzis (born 1978), Greek footballer
- Michalis Chrisochoidis (born 1955), Greek politician
- Michalis Christofi (born 1969), retired Cypriot football goalkeeper
- Michalis Delavinias (1921–2003), Greek footballer
- Michalis Dorizas (1886–1957), Greek athlete
- Michalis Fakinos (born 1940), Greek writer
- Michalis Fani (born 1981), Cypriot former footballer
- Michalis Filippou (born 1951), Greek football manager
- Michalis Floriotis, Greek television producer
- Michalis Genitsaris (1917– 2005), Greek singer
- Michalis Giannatos (1941–2013), Greek actοr
- Michalis Giannitsis (born 1992), Greek footballer
- Michalis Giannouzakos (born 1949), retired Greek professional basketball player and coach
- Michalis Grigoriou (born 1973), Greek professional football manager
- Michalis Hatzigiannis (born 1978), Greek singer
- Michalis Ioannou (born 2000), Greek Cypriot footballer
- Michalis Iliadis (born 1996), Greek footballer
- Achilleas Michalis Kallakis (born 1968), English Greek fraudster
- Michalis Kallergis (born 1996), Greek footballer
- Michalis Kaltezas (1970–1985), Greek murder victim
- Michalis Kamperidis (born 1994), Greek basketball player
- Michalis Karaolis (1933–1956), Cypriot public official and revolutionary
- Michalis Karavasilis (born 1975), retired Greek footballer
- Michalis Karchimakis (born 1957), Greek politician
- Michalis Karvouniaris (born 1993), Greek footballer
- Michalis Kapsis (born 1973), Greek former footballer
- Michalis Kasapis (born 1971), Greek former footballer
- Michalis Katsaros (1919–1998), Greek poet
- Michalis Katsouris (died 2023), Greek murder victim
- Michalis Klokidis (born 1971), Greek footballer
- Michalis Konstantinou (born 1978), Cypriot footballer
- Michalis Kouinelis (born 1979), Greek rapper
- Michalis Kouiroukidis (born 1995), Greek footballer
- Michalis Kourmoulis (1765–1824), Greek leader in the Greek War of Independence
- Michalis Kousis (1953–2005), Greek long-distance runner
- Michalis Kosidis (born 2002), Greek footballer
- Michalis Kripintiris (born 1981), Greek footballer
- Michalis Kritikopoulos (1946–2002), Greek footballer
- Michalis Kyrgias (born 1989), Greek footballer
- Michalis Kyritsis (born 1945), Greek former professional basketball player and coach
- Michalis Liapis (born 1951), Greek politician
- Michalis Lountzis (born 1998), Greek basketball player
- Michalis Lygnos (born 1974), Greek retired football defender
- Michalis Morfis (born 1979), Cypriot footballer
- Michalis Mouroutsos (born 1980), Greek taekwondo practitioner
- Michalis Music (born 1999), Cypriot footballer of Serbian descent
- Michalis Nikolinakos (1923–1994), Greek theatrical and cinematic actor
- Michalis Oikonomou (1888–1933), Greek impressionist painter
- Michalis Panagidis (born 2004), Greek footballer
- Michalis Paraskevas (born 1976), Cypriot lawyer
- Michalis Papakonstantinou (1919–2010), Greek politician and author
- Michalis Papatheodorou (1928–1992), Greek footballer
- Michalis Papazoglou (circa 1910s), Greek athlete
- Michalis Papanikolas (born 1993), Greek footballer
- Michalis Pavlis (born 1989), Greek former footballer
- Michalis Pelekanos (born 1981), Greek basketball player
- Michalis Polytarchou (born 1983), Greek basketball player
- Michalis Rakintzis (born 1957), Greek singer
- Michalis Raptis (1911–1996), Greek Trotskyist leader
- Michalis Romanidis (born 1966), retired Greek basketball player
- Michalis Sallas (born 1950), Greek businessman, banker and academic
- Michalis Sifakis (born 1984), Greek former footballer
- Michalis Simigdalas (born 1944), Greek professional footballer
- Michalis Stafylas (1920–2018), Greek writer
- Michalis Stamatogiannis (born 1982), Greek shot putter
- Michalis Stivaros (1892–1912), Cypriot soldier
- Michalis Tiverios, Greek archaeologist
- Michalis Tremopoulos (born 1958), Greek lawyer, journalist, environmentalist and politician
- Michalis Triantafyllidis (born 1962), retired Greek volleyball player
- Michalis Trochanas (1936– 2020), Greek businessman
- Michalis Tsairelis (born 1988), Greek basketball player
- Michalis Tsoumanis (born 2002), Greek footballer
- Michalis Tzirakis (born 1954), Greek former footballer
- Michalis Vakalopoulos (born 1990), Dutch-Greek professional footballer
- Michalis Vardanis (1936–2014), Greek Army officer
- Michalis Violaris (born 1944), Greek composer and singer
- Michalis Vlachos (born 1967), Greek former professional footballer
- Michalis Zacharopoulos (born 1995), Greek footballer
- Michalis Zambidis (born 1980), Greek kickboxer
- Michalis Zaropoulos (born 1991), Greek footballer
- Michalis Ziogas (born 1962), Greek former footballer

== See also ==
- Captain Michalis
- Michael (given name)
