= 1996 Greek Football Cup final =

1996 Greek Cup final
- Event: 1995–96 Greek Football Cup
Apollon Athens	AEK Athens
1	7
- Date: 16 April 1997
- Venue: Olympic Stadium, Marousi, Athens
- Referee: Christos Sotiropoulos (Piraeus)
- Attendance: 31,563

The 1996 Greek Cup final was the 52nd final of the Greek Cup. The match took place on 15 May 1996 at the Olympic Stadium. The contesting teams were Apollon Athens and AEK Athens. It was Apollon Athens' first-ever Greek Cup final in their 105 years of existence and AEK Athens' fourtheenth Greek Cup final and third consecutive in their 72-year history. Demis Nikolaidis played his last match as footballer of Apollon Athens, a few days before his transfer to AEK Athens. With their 7–1 win over Apollon Athens, AEK Athens achieved a record victory in the history of the Greek Cup finals. Furthermore, it proved to be the only Cup title, as well as the last trophy won by Dušan Bajević as the manager of AEK Athens.

== Venue ==
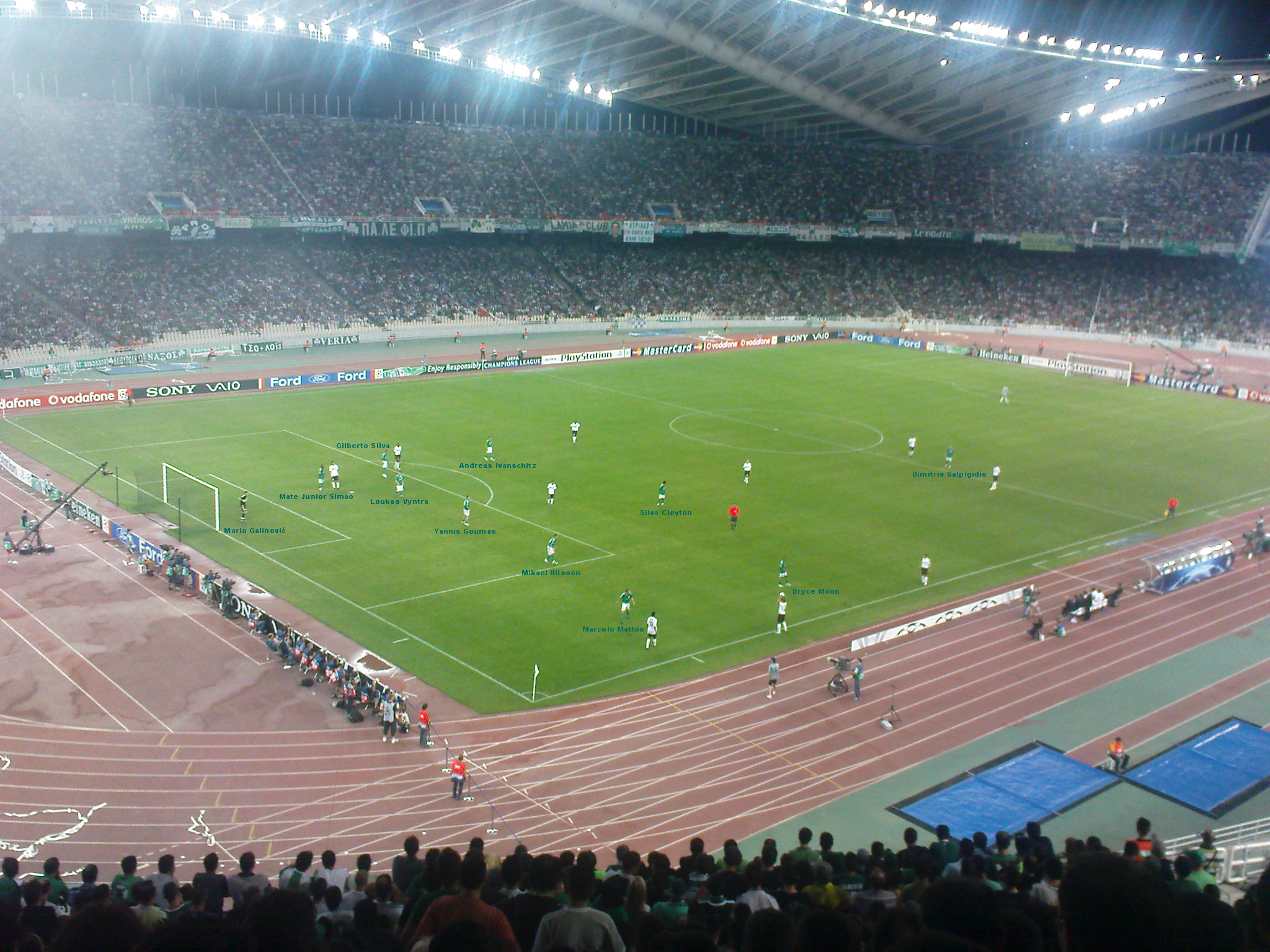
Athens Olympic Stadium.

This was the twelfth Greek Cup final held at the Athens Olympic Stadium, after the 1983, 1984, 1985, 1986, 1987, 1988, 1989, 1990, 1993, 1994 and 1995 finals.

The Athens Olympic Stadium was built in 1982. The stadium is used as a venue for Panathinaikos and Greece and was used for Olympiacos and AEK Athens on various occasions. Its current capacity is 80,000 and hosted two European Cup/UEFA Champions League finals in 1983 and 1994, a UEFA Cup Winners' Cup final in 1987 and the 1991 Mediterranean Games.

== Background ==
Apollon Athens had never competed in a Cup final.

AEK Athens had reached the Greek Cup final thirteen times, winning eight of them. The last time that they had won the Cup was in 1983 (2–0 against PAOK). The last time that they had played in a final was in 1995, where they had lost to Panathinaikos by 1–0 after the extra time.

The two teams had never met each other in a Cup final.

== Route to the final ==
Apollon Athens				Round	AEK Athens			
Opponent	Result			Group stage	Opponent	Result		
Panelfsiniakos	Unknown			Matchday 1	Almopos Aridea	6–2 (H)		
Atromitos	Unknown			Matchday 2	Olympiacos Volos	2–0 (A)		
Kalamata	Unknown			Matchday 3	Panegialios	4–1 (H)		
Ambelokipoi Thessaloniki	Unknown			Matchday 4	Panathinaikos	1–3 (A)		
Group 3 winners: Team / Pts; Apollon Athens / 12; Panelfsiniakos / 5; Atromitos / 4; Kalamata / 4; Ambelokipoi Thessaloniki / 2				Final standings	Group 1 runners-up: Team / Pts; Panathinaikos / 12; AEK Athens / 9; Panegialios / 6; Olympiacos Volos / 1; Almopos Aridea / 1			
Opponent	Agg.	1st leg	2nd leg	Knockout phase	Opponent	Agg.	1st leg	2nd leg
Paniliakos	5–4	2–1 (H)	3–3 (A)	Round of 32	Iraklis	3–0	1–0 (H)	2–0 (A)
Panetolikos	4–3	2–1 (A)	2–2 (H)	Round of 16	Olympiacos	4–1	3–1 (A)	1–1 (H)
Skoda Xanthi	5–2	4–0 (H)	1–2 (A)	Quarter-finals	Panathinaikos	5–4	3–1 (H)	2–2 (A)
PAOK	4–2	1–1 (H)	3–1 (A)	Semi-finals	Athinaikos	6–0	5–0 (H)	1–0 (A)

== Match ==
=== Details ===
15 May 1996
17:30 EEST

Apollon Athens	1–7	AEK Athens
Barnjak 78'	Report (page 5)	Batista 11', 34'; Tsiartas 22', 48' (pen.), 76'; Ketsbaia 60'; Kostis 89'

Olympic Stadium, Marousi
Attendance: 31,563
Referee: Christos Sotiropoulos (Piraeus)

Apollon Athens	ΑΕΚ Athens

GK	1	(Greece) Dimitris Raptis
RB	7	(Bosnia and Herzegovina) Predrag Erak	(yellow card) 25'
CB	3	(Greece) Kostas Mavridis		(substituted off) 55'
CB	4	(Greece) Andreas Theodoropoulos		(substituted off) 35'
LB	5	(Greece) Giannis Apostolou		(substituted off) 46'
DM	2	(Greece) Konstantinos Ioannou
CM	10	(Albania) Bledar Kola
RM	6	(Greece) Giannis Tatsis
LM	8	(Greece) Lefteris Velentzas (c)
CF	9	(Bosnia and Herzegovina) Bernard Barnjak
CF	11	(Greece) Demis Nikolaidis
Substitutes:
DF	12	(Greece) Panagiotis Lachanas		(substituted on) 55'
DF	13	(Greece) Vangelis Kefalas	(yellow card) 76'	(substituted on) 46'
MF	14	(Greece) Theodoros Alexis		(substituted on) 35'
Manager:
(Greece) Giannis Pathiakakis

GK	1	(Greece) Ilias Atmatsidis
CB	3	(Greece) Nikos Kostenoglou
CB	4	(Greece) Stelios Manolas (c)	(yellow card) 29'
CB	6	(Greece) Michalis Vlachos	(yellow card) 1'	(substituted off) 66'
DM	5	(Bosnia and Herzegovina) Refik Šabanadžović
CM	8	(North Macedonia) Toni Savevski
RM	2	(Greece) Vasilios Borbokis	(yellow card) 8'	(substituted off) 66'
LM	11	(Greece) Michalis Kasapis	(yellow card) 2'
AM	10	(Greece) Vasilios Tsiartas		(substituted off) 82'
SS	7	(Georgia (country)) Temur Ketsbaia
CF	9	(Greece) Daniel Batista	(red card) 52'
Substitutes:
GK	15	(Greece) Vasilis Karagiannis
DF	13	(Greece) Vaios Karagiannis		(substituted on) 82'
DF	16	(Greece) Charis Kopitsis
MF	14	(Greece) Christos Maladenis		(substituted on) 66'
FW	12	(Greece) Christos Kostis		(substituted on) 66'
Manager:
(Bosnia and Herzegovina) Dušan Bajević

Assistant referees:
Antonis Togias (Piraeus)
Nikos Vergis (Thessaloniki)
Fourth official:
Malamas Tevekelis (Thessaloniki)

Match rules

- 90 minutes
- 30 minutes of extra time if necessary
- Penalty shootout if scores still level
- Five named substitutes
- Maximum of three substitutions

== See also ==
- 1995–96 Greek Football Cup
