= Fakinos =

Fakinos is a surname. Notable people with the surname include:

- Giannoulis Fakinos
- Michalis Fakinos
