= Athanasis Karanikolas =

Greek footballer

Personal information
- Full name: Athanasios Karanikolas
- Date of birth: 5 May 1972 (age 54)
- Height: 1.82 m (6 ft 0 in)
- Position: Midfielder

Senior career*
Years	Team	Apps	(Gls)
1996–2000	Apollon Smyrnis		
2001–2003	Panegialios		
- * Club domestic league appearances and goals

Athanasis Karanikolas (Greek: Αθανάσις Καρανικόλας; born 5 May 1972) is a retired Greek football midfielder.
