= Michalis Attalides =

Cypriot academic

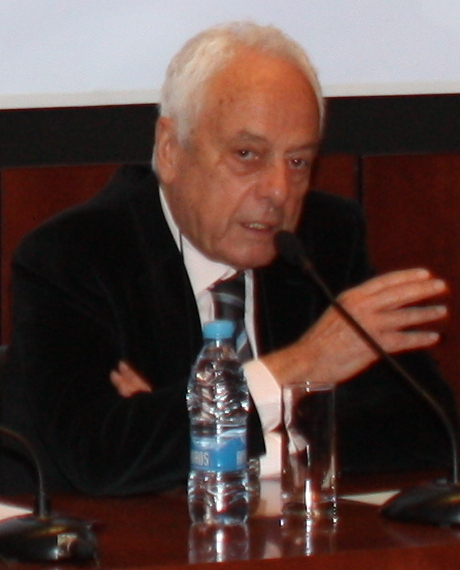
2013 Image of Michalis Attalides

Michael Attalides (also Michalis Attalidis; Greek: Μιχάλης Ατταλίδης) is a Cypriot academic, former civil servant and diplomat to Cyprus. He is the current Rector at the University of Nicosia in Nicosia, Cyprus.

After graduating from the London School of Economics and Political Science with a BSc in Economics, he received an MA and, in 1966, a PhD in Sociology from Princeton University.

He has represented the Republic of Cyprus as its Ambassador in a number of capitals, including Paris, London, and the European Union in Brussels, before being appointed Permanent Secretary of the Ministry of Foreign Affairs. He has also represented the Cyprus Government in the European Convention.

Following his retirement from civil service, he has been Dean of the School of Humanities, Social Sciences and Law at Intercollege, a lecturer in Sociology at the University of Leicester, a counterpart to the UNESCO Expert at the Cyprus Social Research Centre and a guest lecturer at the Free University of Berlin.

He is currently the Rector at the University of Nicosia, formerly called Intercollege, in Nicosia, Cyprus, serving on the Council and the Senate of the University.

He has published several books including Cyprus: Nationalism and International Politics, and Social Change and Urbanisation in Cyprus. He has also published a number of articles on society and politics in Cyprus and Greece.
