= Michalis Trochanas =

Greek businessman (1936–2020)

- Michalis Trochanas

35th president of AEK Athens
- In office 4 October 1995 – 2 April 1996
- Preceded by: Giannis Karras
- Succeeded by: Nikos Stratos

Personal details
- Born: 25 June 1936 Pyrgos, Greece
- Died: 5 March 2020 (aged 83) Rafina, Greece
- Children: Nikolas Trochanas; Giorgos Trochanas
- Occupation: Entrepreneur
- Known for: Owner of AEK Athens F.C.

Michalis Trochanas (Greek: Μιχάλης Τροχανάς; 25 June 1936 – 5 March 2020) was a Greek businessman and the major shareholder of AEK Athens F.C. from 1995 to 1997. During his tenure, AEK won two Greek Cups and a Greek Super Cup. In 1997 he sold the shares of the club to ENIC Hellas.

== Early life ==
Trochanas founded SOE as a "model" business group that raised funds from tens of thousands of investors to finance the construction of residential developments in Crete and Attica. According to later reports, the investment relied on funds provided by small shareholders, who invested their savings and were encouraged to recruit additional investors through a pyramid scheme.

== AEK Athens ==
On 19 May 1995, Trochanas acquired the majority stake in AEK Athens from Dimitris Melissanidis and Ioannis Karras for approximately 1.5 billion drachmas. On 4 October he also became the club's president.

During his tenure as owner of the club, AEK won two consecutive Greek Cups, a Greek Super Cup and reached the quarter-finals of the UEFA Cup Winners' Cup. However, his ownership was marked by frequent controversy. Following disciplinary sanctions imposed by the HFF, Trochanas was formally removed from the presidency of the club and was replaced by Nikos Stratos and later by Giorgos Kyriopoulos. In the summer of 1996 the manager of the club, Dušan Bajević left the club after seven years and joined arch-rivals Olympiacos. Although many supporters turned against Bajević because of his move, they also blamed Trochanas, citing his strained relationship with the Bosnian manager and his frequent interference in the latter's work. These events ultimately led to his withdrawal from the club's management.

On 20 June 1996 Trochanas completed the signing Demis Nikolaidis from Apollon Athens, despite the interest of Olympiacos. Trochanas famously stated that "The footballer Demis Nikolaidis from next season will not have the double-headed eagle only in his heart", confirming the transfer a few hours later. Several key players also left the club such as Vasilios Tsiartas who was sold to Sevilla, Refik Šabanadžović who moved to Olympiacos in the summer of 1996, while Temur Ketsbaia and Vasilios Borbokis left for England in the following summer.

Trochanas' feud with the ultras continued, with the Greek businessman being forced to initiate the sale of the club. On 1 July 1997 he appointed the lawyer Alexis Kougias as club president. The appointment further angered the club's ultras, who expressed their indignation and their demand for Trochanas' departure in the first training session of the season. On 7 October 1997, he eventually sold his shares to ENIC Hellas, for 2.4 billion drachmas, leaving the club.

Trochanas remained active in public discussions surrounding AEK and had many interventions and various proposals. He continued to take an interest in the affairs of AEK and tried to prevent the club's eventual financial and sporting decline. On 29 January 2012, he met with several prominent AEK figures. The "Themelio 21" proposal, despite its recommendation, was never implemented.

== Aris ==
In 1997 Trochanas was involved with the management of Aris, participating in their administrative effort to recover it, through a supporter-owned model. The initiative was based on the well-known "20,000-drachma fee". Supporters were invited to contribute with the aim of strengthening the club and acquiring shares of a corresponding value over time. Thousands of supporters contributed to the initiative, as the club required financial support to avoid relegation to the second division. The money that was collected provided an important financial boost to the team, which was fighting for promotion. Even though Trochanas never became the club's owner and his involvement was brief, he left a lasting legacy at Aris.

== Death ==
Trochanas suffered from health problems and died on 5 March 2020 at his home in Rafina at the age of 83. His funeral took place four days later. He was buried with the flag of AEK Athens, as was one of his last wishes.
