= Apostolos Dimopoulos =

Greek footballer

Personal information
- Date of birth: 17 December 1974 (age 51)
- Position: Defender

Senior career*
| Years | Team | Apps | (Gls) |
| 1995–1998 | Ethnikos Piraeus | | |
| 1999 | Ethnikos Asteras | | |
| 1999–? | Agios Dimitrios | | |
- Keratsini
- * Club domestic league appearances and goals

Apostolos Dimopoulos (Greek: Απόστολος Δημόπουλος; born 17 December 1974) is a retired Greek football defender.
