= Konstantinos Pavlopoulos =

Greek footballer (born 1971)

Personal information
- Full name: Konstantinos Pavlopoulos
- Date of birth: 26 December 1971 (age 54)
- Position: Center back

Senior career*
Years	Team	Apps	(Gls)
1988–1990	Naoussa	43	(1)
1990–1991	Panathinaikos	2	(0)
1991–1995	OFI	98	(6)
1995–1998	AEK Athens	19	(1)
1998–2001	OFI	55	(4)
2001–2002	Ethnikos Piraeus	7	(1)
Total		224	(13)

International career
1989–1993	Greece U21	3	(0)
1992–1995	Greece	3	(0)
- * Club domestic league appearances and goals

Konstantinos Pavlopoulos (Greek: Κωνσταντίνος Παυλόπουλος; born 26 December 1971) is a Greek former professional footballer who played as a center back.

== Club career ==
Pavlopoulos started his career Naoussa, where the agents of Panathinaikos noticed him and eventually acquired him in the summer of 1990. He did not manage to establish himself in the "greens", who won the Championship of that year and in the following season he moved to OFI. In the Cretan team he played for 4 seasons and had a very good performance, attracting the interest of Olympiacos and AEK Athens.

In the summer of 1995 Pavlopoulos eventually signed for AEK. In the second opportunity given to him in a big club, he did not manage to establish himself again, as he remained in the "shadow" of the other central defenders of the team. During his spell at AEK, Pavlopoulos won 2 Cups in 1996 and 1997 and the Greek Super Cup in 1996.

On 14 January 1998, he was released from AEK and returned to OFI. In his second spell at the Cretan club, he played for 3 years, before joining Ethnikos Piraeus to end his career in 2002.

== International career ==
Pavlopoulos made 3 appearances with Greece between 1992 and 1995.

== Honours ==
Panathinaikos

- Alpha Ethniki: 1990–91

AEK Athens

- Greek Cup: 1995–96, 1996–97
- Greek Super Cup: 1996
