= A.O. Karditsa F.C. =

Greek football club

A.O. Karditsa
- Full name: Athlitikos Omilos Karditsa
- Founded: 1966; 60 years ago
- Ground: Municipal Stadium of Kaminades
- Capacity: 400
- Chairman: Dimitris Tantos
- Manager: Konstantinos Siakaras
- League: Karditsa FCA First Division
- 2025–26: Karditsa FCA First Division, 10th
Home colours	Away colours

A.O. Karditsa F.C. is a Greek football club, based in Karditsa, Thessaly, Greece.

== History ==
A.O. Karditsa F.C. was founded in 1966. The period 1970–1971 played for the first time in B Ethniki, where he remained until 1976. The season 1978–1979 returned to B Ethniki but relegated the same season.

In the early 1980s, after the restructuring and professionalisation of football, the AOK relegated to Delta Etniki, and from there to the Local League of Karditsa, from where he returned to Delta Ethniki in 1987.

The "blue white" go up in the Gamma Ethniki for the first time in club history. They will remain for two seasons (1998–1999, 1999–2000).

The team returned to the Football League 2 for the 2013–14 season. Nowadays competes between 3rd tier and A'EPS Thessaly.

== Participations ==
Tiers	Seasons
Super League 2	6
Gamma Ethniki	6
Delta Ethniki*	23
EPS Thessaly first division	13

*In 2013 Delta Ethniki merged with Gamma Ethniki.

== Rivalries ==
The club has a bitter rivalry with their local neighbours Anagennisi Karditsa.

== Honours ==
- Third Division: 1
  - 1969-70
- Fourth Division: 1
  - 1997-98
- Greek Football Amateur Cup: 1
  - 1976-77
- Karditsa FCA First Division: 8
  - 1969-70, 1975-76, 1976-77, 1983-84, 1985-86, 1994-95, 2002-03, 2007-08
- Karditsa FCA Cup: 14
  - 1976-77, 1977-78, 1979-80, 1985-86, 1986-87, 1989-90, 1991-92, 1994-95, 2000-01, 2002-03, 2007-08, 2008-09, 2009-10, 2010-11
- Karditsa FCA Super Cup: 1
  - 2010-11

== Managers ==
- Giannis Mangos (2013–2014)
- Vaios Karagiannis (2013)
