= Michalis Lygnos =

Greek footballer

Personal information
- Full name: Michail Lygnos
- Date of birth: 12 February 1974 (age 52)
- Place of birth: Syros, Greece
- Height: 1.89 m (6 ft 2 in)
- Position: Defender

Senior career*
Years	Team	Apps	(Gls)
–1994	Atromitos		
1994–1998	Paniliakos		
1998–2003	Panachaiki		
2003–2004	Kerkyra		
- * Club domestic league appearances and goals

Michalis Lygnos (Greek: Μιχάλης Λυγνός; born 12 February 1974) is a Greek retired football defender.
