= Georgios Theodoridis (footballer, born 1973) =

Greek footballer (born 1973)

Giorgos Theodoridis
Personal information
- Full name: Georgios Theodoridis
- Date of birth: 8 July 1973 (age 53)
- Place of birth: Naousa, Greece
- Height: 1.85 m (6 ft 1 in)
- Position: Defender

Youth career
- –1991: Doxa Markochori

Senior career*
Years	Team	Apps	(Gls)
1991–1997	AEK Athens	2	(0)
1992–1993	→ Pierikos (loan)	9^{[a]}	(0^{[a]})
1993–1995	→ Edessaikos (loan)	43	(2)
1996–1997	→ Edessaikos (loan)	19	(0)
1997–1998	Doxa Vyronas		
1998–1999	Aris	3	(0)
1999	Panelefsiniakos	13	(0)
1999–2000	Nafpaktiakos Asteras		
2000–2001	Veria		

International career
1990–1991	Greece U19		(1)
1994–1995	Greece U21	2	(0)
- * Club domestic league appearances and goals

Georgios Theodoridis (Greek: Γεώργιος Θεοδωρίδης; born 8 July 1973) is a Greek former professional footballer who played as defender.

== Club career ==
Theodoridis grew up in Veria and began his involvement with football at Doxa Markochori, that competed in the fourth division. On 6 July 1991 he was transferred to AEK Athens for a fee of 5.7 million drachmas. He was used as a substitute, since it was difficult to earn a spot to the starting line up at the time. At the end of the season AEK won the Championship.

On 27 November 1992 he was loaned for a year to Pierikos. After his loan ended in December 1993, he was immediately re-loaned to Edessaikos, until the end of the season. There, he became a regular and 25 July 1994 he renewed his loan for another season. He returned to AEK in the following season staying with the team for another year, but again was not able to establish himself in the main squad. He was part of the team that won the Cup in 1996. On 12 July 1992 he was loaned again to Edessaikos for another season.

On 31 July 1997 left the yellow-blacks and was transferred to Doxa Vyronas. He stayed for a season at the club of Vyronas, before moving to Aris. In December 1999 he left the club of Thessaloniki and moved to Panelefsiniakos, where he spent the rest of the season. In the summer of 1999 he joined Nafpaktiakos Asteras, where he played for season. Afterwards, he joined Veria, where he ended his professional career in 2001.

== International career ==
Theodoridis was member of the squad of Greece U19 that played in the qualifiers of the 1992 UEFA European Under-18 Championship. He also earned two caps with Greece U21, between 1994 and 1995.

== After football ==
Theodoridis lives in Veria, where he has an OPAP agency.

a. Does not include 2nd division stats.

== Honours ==
AEK Athens

- Alpha Ethniki: 1991–92
- Greek Cup: 1995–96
