= Michalis Fakinos =

Greek writer

- Born: 29 June 1940 (age 86); Athens, Greece
- Occupations: Writer, journalist
- Writing career
- Period: 1983–present

Michalis Fakinos (Greek: Μιχάλης Φακίνος; born 1940) is an acclaimed Greek writer. He was a journalist for the major Greek newspaper Ta Nea from 1961 to 2000 and he taught journalism at the Panteion University (1999–2000). Some of his works have been translated into French, German and Dutch.

== Works ==
=== Novels ===
- Βυζαντινή Περίπολος (Byzantine Patrol), 1988
- Ως φαίνεται η γιαγιά κοιμάται ακόμη (As it seems, the grandmother is still asleep), 1991
- Η Ιουλιέτα αγαπά τα ροδάκινα (Juliet likes peaches), 1994
- Το τελευταίο μυθιστόρημα του 20ου αιώνα (The last novel of the 20th century), 1999
- Η επικάλυψη δεν είναι σοκολάτα (The topping isn't chocolate), 2002
- Αμερικάνικη κραυγή (American scream), 2005

=== Short stories ===
- Οι κωπηλάτες (The oarsmen), (1983)
- Ο Ιωσήφ εξαφανίζεται (Joseph disappears), 1984
- Όμηρος Μπαρ (Bar "Homer"), 1997

=== Theater ===
- Ματ (Check Mate), 1985
- Waiting for Beckett, 2000
