= Vaios Karagiannis =

Greek footballer and manager

Personal information
- Full name: Vaios Karagiannis
- Date of birth: 25 June 1968 (age 58)
- Place of birth: Itea, Karditsa, Greece
- Height: 1.73 m (5 ft 8 in)
- Position: Defender

Youth career
- –1986: Enippea Iteas Karditsa

Senior career*
| Years | Team | Apps | (Gls) |
| 1986–1990 | A.O. Karditsa | | |
| 1990–2002 | AEK Athens | 193 | (0) |
| 2002–2003 | Poseidon Neon Poron | 24 | (1) |
| 2004–2006 | Anagennisi Karditsa | 20 | (1) |
| Total | | 237 | (2) |

International career
| 1992–1994 | Greece | 8 | (0) |

Managerial career
- 2006–2008: Anagennisi Karditsa
- 2008: AO Trikala
- 2010: A.O. Karditsa
- 2010–2011: Anagennisi Karditsa
- 2012–2013: A.O. Karditsa
- 2014–2016: Atromitos Palamas
- 2017–2018: Apollon Makrychori
- * Club domestic league appearances and goals

Vaios Karagiannis (Greek: Βάιος Καραγιάννης; born 25 June 1968) is a former Greek professional footballer who played as a defender and current manager.

== Club career ==
Karagiannis started from Enippea Iteas Karditsa and in 1986 he moved to A.O. Karditsa.

On 28 June 1990 he was transferred to AEK Athens for a fee of 11 million drachmas. Despite his lack of experience, Dušan Bajević gave him lots of opportunities, placing him mainly on the left side of the defense. He eventually managed to establish himself in the squad and sporadicaly impressed with his defensive style, his fast pace, his high jump and with "acrobatic" moves. He was a very reliable solution in all positions of the defense. He did very well against the Romário in the European Cup matches against Eindhoven in 1993. The most memorable moment of his career was the tackle on the head of the Brazilian striker for a contest for the ball in the air, in the second match. He was a regular at AEK until 1994, when Michalis Kasapis was established as a left back-half in the team, but even then he made many appearances either as a started or as a substitution. With AEK he won 3 championships, 4 cups and a Greek Super Cup.

In the summer of 2002, after his contract with AEK expired, he signed for Poseidon Neon Poron, where he played for a season. Afterwards he returned to Karditsa and joined Anagennisi Karditsa, where he ended his career in 2006.

== International career ==
Karagiannis played for Greece national team, and was a participant at the 1994 FIFA World Cup, where he played in two matches.

== After football ==
After his playing career was over Karagiannis followed a coaching career. He began at Anagennisi Karditsa, where he stayed from 2006 to 2008. In December 2008, he took over as coach of AO Trikala, until March 2009. He briefly returned to A.O. Karditsa, while in the period 2010–11 again in the Anagennisi Karditsa, collaboration which ended on November 22, 2011, while continuing the 2012–13 season as a coach at A.O. Karditsa. The continuation of his cooperation was announced, but it was terminated in September 2013, due to the exclusion from the Cup and the bad image in the preparatory games. In the summer of 2014 he coached Atromitos Palamas for one and a half season. He also managed Apollon Makrychori, from July 2017 until November 2018, when he resigned.

In 2010 he participated in the elections in 2010 as a candidate councilor of the Municipality of Palamas with the combination of (then elected mayor 2010–2014) Konstantinos Patsialis "Unified Municipal Movement of Palamas", was elected to the Municipal Council 6th with 760 votes, while in January 2013 he was appointed Deputy Mayor.

== Honours ==
AEK Athens

- Alpha Ethniki: 1991–92, 1992–93, 1993–94
- Greek Cup: 1995–96, 1996–97, 1999–2000, 2001–02
- Greek Super Cup: 1996
- Greek League Cup: 1990
