= Predrag Erak =

Bosnian footballer (born 1970)

Personal information
- Date of birth: 1 July 1970 (age 56)
- Place of birth: Travnik, SR Bosnia and Herzegovina, Yugoslavia
- Position: Defender

Youth career
- NK Vlašić Turbe

Senior career*
Years	Team	Apps	(Gls)
1987–1990	Čelik Zenica	65	(3)
1990–1991	Hajduk Split	22	(0)
1991–1995	Iraklis	100	(4)
1995–1998	Apollon Athens	82	(5)
1998–2000	Aris	23	(0)
2000–2001	Atromitos	4	(1)
2001–2002	Sloga Kraljevo		
2003	Zemun	0	(0)
2003–2004	Bačka BP		
Total		296	(13)

International career
1990	Yugoslavia U21	1	(0)

Managerial career
- 2008–2013: APOEL (assistant)
- 2013–2016: Al-Nasr (assistant)
- 2021–2023: Panathinaikos (assistant)
- 2024–: Greece (assistant)
- * Club domestic league appearances and goals

Predrag Erak (Serbian Cyrillic: Предраг Ерак; born 1 July 1970) is a Bosnian football manager and former player.

== Playing career ==
=== Club ===
Born in Travnik, SR Bosnia and Herzegovina, he started playing with NK Vlašić Turbe. Then he played for Čelik Zenica and Hajduk Split in the Yugoslav First League. In 1991, he moved to Greece where he played during the entire decade of the 1990s, first with Iraklis, and then with Apollon Athens, Aris and Atromitos, returning in 2001 to play in Serbia with Sloga Kraljevo and Zemun.

=== International ===
He played for Yugoslavia U21 in 1990.

== Managerial career ==
Since 2008, he has been working with Ivan Jovanović as assistant manager (2008–2013 at APOEL, 2013–2016 at Al-Nasr Dubai, 2021–2023 at Panathinaikos, and since 2024 with Greece).
