= Refik Šabanadžović =

Bosnian footballer (born 1965)

Personal information
- Full name: Refik Šabanadžović
- Date of birth: 2 August 1965 (age 61)
- Place of birth: Tuzi, SR Montenegro, Yugoslavia
- Height: 1.80 m (5 ft 11 in)
- Positions: Midfielder; defender

Youth career
- Dečić
- Budućnost Titograd

Senior career*
Years	Team	Apps	(Gls)
1982–1983	OFK Titograd	23	(1)
1983–1987	Željezničar	82	(0)
1987–1991	Red Star Belgrade	62	(2)
1991–1996	AEK Athens	143	(5)
1996–1998	Olympiacos	25	(0)
1998–1999	Kansas City Wizards	27	(0)
Total		362	(8)

International career
1986–1990	Yugoslavia	8	(0)
- * Club domestic league appearances and goals

Refik Šabanadžović (born 2 August 1965) is a Bosnian former professional footballer who played as a midfielder and defender.

Born in Montenegro, at the time part of SFR Yugoslavia, Šabanadžović played internationally for Yugoslavia and unofficially for the predecessor of Bosnia and Herzegovina national football team.

== Club career ==
Šabanadžović began his career with a Montenegrin club FK Dečić. He was spotted there by Titograd's Budućnost and moved there shortly after. Before the 1983–84 season, following his senior debut with OFK Titograd, he moved to Sarajevo's Željezničar where he became one of the more notable Yugoslav defenders under the guidance of Ivica Osim. He gave his contribution to the club's best European result, UEFA Cup semi-finals in the 1984–85 season.

After four seasons playing for this Bosnian side, he left for Red Star Belgrade. He won three Championships and one Cup at the club, but the most important moment of his entire career was winning the European Cup in the 1991 against Marseille.

On 15 July 1992, Šabanadžović went to Greece and was transferred to AEK Athens for a fee of 18.7 million drachmas, after personal actions by the manager, Dušan Bajević. He established himself immediately, as modern defensive midfielder, who played box to box. Alongside Savevski they formed one of the greatest midfield duos in the history of the club. In his first three seasons he won as many championships, along with a Greek Cup and a Greek Super Cup, with Šabanadžović being one of the protagonists. His last year at AEK was accompanied by stunning football, with the addition of Tsiartas and Ketsbaia in the midfield, with the club winning the Cup and finishing second in the league.

In the summer of 1996, his contract was expired and Šabanadžović, followed Bajević to Olympiacos, as they offered them a greater deal. In Piraeus, he added two more league titles to his portfolio, but he never reached the standards of his previous career making only 25 appearances in two seasons.

In the winter of 1998, Šabanadžović moved to Major League Soccer club Kansas City Wizards where he came on the recommendation of his friend Preki Radosavljević. He played there for two years before finally retiring at the end of the 1998–99 season.

== International career ==
Šabanadžović's appearances in the Yugoslavia national team were largely sporadic. With 8 caps in total (6 starts and 2 substitute appearances) spanning four years from 1986 until 1990, all under head coach Ivica Osim, the highlight of Šabanadžović's time with the national team was his appearance at the 1990 FIFA World Cup in Italy. Though he made 4 starting appearances during the competition, with confident defensive displays, he is mostly remembered for getting sent-off in the 31st minute of the quarter-final versus Argentina.

=== Euro 1988 qualifying ===
Šabanadžović made his national team debut on 29 October 1986, as a starter in defensive line in the opening Euro 88 qualifier versus Turkey in Split. National team head coach Ivica Osim—himself only in his 4th match overall leading the squad and his first one doing it alone as he had previously shared the coaching duties with Ivan Toplak—knew the twenty-one-year-old Željezničar defender well from their time together at Grbavica from 1983 until 1986 and decided to include him in the team as a result of an injury incurred by defensive mainstay Faruk Hadžibegić thereby causing a bit of a surprise by having a debutante in the starting lineup of a competitive match. In fact, Šabanadžović was one of three players to get a start on their debut that day—the other two being yet another Željo youngster Radmilo Mihajlović (about to turn twenty two) and Rijeka goalkeeper Mauro Ravnić (almost twenty seven years of age). Yugoslavia recorded a comfortable 4–0 win, with Šabanadžović putting in a decent performance. Two weeks later, Yugoslavia traveled to Wembley for a pivotal qualifier versus Bobby Robson's England. Šabanadžović again got the start in defence, but unfortunately this time had a match to forget much like the rest of the Yugoslav team as they lost easily 0–2. He didn't feature again for the rest of the qualifying cycle as Hadžibegić recovered from injury.

Simultaneously, while not getting a chance in the national team full squad, young Šabanadžović fared better in the under-23 (Olympic) team, getting included in the squad taken to Seoul for the 1988 Olympics where he started each of the three Yugoslavia matches as the team failed to progress out of the first round group stage. Also selected and coached by the national team full squad coach Osim, the inclusion of Šabanadžović in the Olympic team came as a bit of surprise considering the twenty-three-year-old was still recovering from the horrific head injury he had endured in a Yugoslav league match some 10 months earlier that saw him in coma for 3 days and out of footballing action for 6 months.

=== 1990 World Cup qualifying ===
It would be almost two years before Šabanadžović saw national team full squad action again. In mid October 1988, Yugoslavia played its opening 1990 World Cup qualifier in Glasgow versus Scotland. With the score tied at 1–1, looking to protect the draw, Osim brought the defender on for attacking midfielder Bora Cvetković in the 89th minute. Those few minutes were Šabanadžović's only action of the entire qualifying cycle as he got called up a few more times, but remained an unused sub. Yugoslavia finished the group on top thus qualifying to the final tournament in Italy.

=== 1990 World Cup ===
The April 1990 inclusion of twenty-four-year-old Šabanadžović in Osim's final squad for the World Cup came as a surprise considering he only played several minutes in qualifiers and had only one substitute appearance in the pre-World Cup friendlies – the match versus Spain in Ljubljana.

For the group stage opener versus West Germany at San Siro, Šabanadžović stayed on the bench without a single minute of action. Due to the heavy opening loss, Osim decided to reshuffle the defensive line for the next group match against Colombia in Bologna, benching Zoran Vulić and Mirsad Baljić while giving Šabanadžović and Vujadin Stanojković a start. Šabanadžović played the full ninety as Yugoslavia recorded a hard-fought 1–0 win. Five days later, he again got the start in the final group match versus minnows United Arab Emirates before getting subbed off towards the end for club teammate Robert Prosinečki as Yugoslavia managed an easy 4–1 win.

For the knockout stage versus Spain, Šabanadžović again got the start and repaid the coach's trust with a confident display as Yugoslavia progressed with a 2–1 extra-time win. By now, Šabanadžović's stock in Osim's eyes was raised to the point that the coach gave him the unenviable task of guarding Diego Maradona in the quarter-final versus Argentina in Florence. Unfortunately, the matchup ended very early for Šabanadžović as he collected two yellow cards in the span of only seven minutes during first half: the first for what the Swiss referee Kurt Röthlisberger adjudged to be improper behaviour during the setting up of the Yugoslav wall before Argentinian free-kick and the second one in the 31st minute for a foul on Maradona. Until the end, the 10-man Yugoslavia fought bravely, creating several excellent goal-scoring opportunities, but eventually lost on penalties in heart-breaking fashion.

Šabanadžović never played for the national team again. In total, he collected 8 caps in the Yugoslavia national team.

=== Bosnia and Herzegovina ===
In March 1993, while the Bosnian War was raging, 27-year-old Šabanadžović took part in two friendly matches as part of "Bosnia-Herzegovina Humanitarian Stars" versus K.R.C. Genk and 1. FC Kaiserslautern in Genk and Koblenz, respectively. The hastily arranged team also featured many Bosnian born players who previously played in the Yugoslavia national team such as Faruk Hadžibegić, Safet Sušić, Mehmed Baždarević, Mirsad Baljić, Davor Jozić, Blaž Slišković, Haris Škoro, Semir Tuce, Meho Kodro, Predrag Jurić, and Husref Musemić. Though the matches only had humanitarian character, they were played with FIFA's approval and were widely seen as the first step in the eventual formation of the Bosnia and Herzegovina national football team.

Once the Bosnian national team started playing official matches in late November 1995, Šabanadžović didn't make further appearances.

== Personal life ==
Šabanadžović lives in Sarajevo, Bosnia and Herzegovina with his wife Zerina Dervišević and their four children. His son Anel is a footballer who also plays for AEK Athens.

== Injury ==
On 15 October 1987, only three months after transferring to Red Star Belgrade from FK Željezničar, Šabanadžović was injured severely during his first match back in Sarajevo against his old club. Early into the league contest at Grbavica Stadium, while jostling for position to go up for a header, Željezničar's forward Zoran Slišković elbowed Šabanadžović's head, striking his temple forcefully. The impact was so powerful that Šabanadžović ended up in a coma for 3 days. He was immediately airlifted by helicopter to Belgrade and hospitalized for a month.

Luckily, he recovered completely and returned to competitive action about six months later to great success. Couple of months after returning to football, he was named to the Olympic squad taken to Seoul during summer 1988.

== Honours ==
Red Star

- European Cup: 1990–91
- Yugoslav First League: 1987–88, 1989–90, 1990–91
- Yugoslav Cup: 1989–90

AEK Athens

- Alpha Ethniki: 1991–92, 1992–93, 1993–94
- Greek Cup: 1995–96
- Greek Super Cup: 1996

Olympiacos

- Alpha Ethniki: 1996–97, 1997–98
