= 1994–95 AEK Athens F.C. season =

AEK Athens
1994–95 season
- Chairman: Dimitris Melissanidis (until 31 May); Giannis Karras
- Manager: Dušan Bajević
- Stadium: Nikos Goumas Stadium
- Alpha Ethniki: 5th
- Greek Cup: Runners-up
- Greek Super Cup: Runners-up
- UEFA Champions League: Group Stage
- Top goalscorer: League: Dimitris Saravakos (21); All: Dimitris Saravakos (26)
- Highest home attendance: 24,747 vs Ajax (28 September 1994)
- Lowest home attendance: 539 vs Doxa Vyronas (30 November 1994)
- Average home league attendance: 7,445
- Biggest win: Panetolikos 0–5 AEK Athens
- Biggest defeat: AEK Athens 0–3 Panathinaikos; Panathinaikos 3–0 AEK Athens
Home colours	Away colours	Third colours

The 1994–95 season was the 71st season in the existence of AEK Athens F.C. and the 36th consecutive season in the top flight of Greek football. They competed in the Alpha Ethniki, the Greek Cup, the Greek Super Cup and the UEFA Champions League. The season began on 10 August 1994 and finished on 3 June 1995.

== Kits ==
Supplier: Diadora
Sponsor(s): Phoenix Asfaleies

Home	Away	Third

== Overview ==
In the summer of 1994, AEK having won three consecutive championships, entered the season focused on achieving success in European competitions. The club leaders, Melissanidis-Karras-Bajevic, decided to invest heavily in the transfer market, in an attempt to qualify for the inaugural UEFA Champions League group stage. Thus, despite the departure of the last season's top scorer, Alexis Alexandris for Olympiacos, the club made several high-profile signings. The "hottest" name of the domestic transfer market, Christos Kostis, Dimitris Saravakos, who was released by Panathinaikos, the Georgian international, Temur Ketsbaia from Anorthosis and the talented Nikos Kostenoglou from Skoda Xanthi were among the club's most notable signings.

The season did not start well for the team, as they were defeated in the Super Cup at the hands of Panathinaikos. AEK had assembled a strong squad, but struggled to cope with the demands of competing domestically and in Europe, they soon fell behind in the league race. In the second round, the administrative uncertainty in the team returned to the spotlight, since Melissanidis-Karras encountered financial difficulties in their business interests and decided to search for a buyer for the club. The whole situation had a negative impact on the team and as a result AEK finished in fifth place, with Panathinaikos winning the league comfortably.

AEK were drawn against Walter Smith's Rangers. On 10 August at Nikos Goumas Stadium, Saravakos delivered a superb individual performance, scoring both goals in AEK's 2–0 victory. Rangers were determined to overturn the deficit in the rematch. However, they faced a disciplined AEK side that took the lead with Savevski after a cross from Tsiartas at the end of the first half. Thereafter, AEK adopted a disciplined tactical approach to the match, which led to a historic victory and qualification. In a difficult group with Ajax of Louis van Gaal, who eventually won the trophy, AC Milan of Fabio Capello, the eventual runners-up and Casino Salzburg, AEK finished fourth with a total of two draws and four defeats.

Having fallen out of title contention early in the season, AEK were focused on claiming the Cup. They easily passed the first round, finishing first in a group with Panargiakos, Atromitos, Kastoria and Ethnikos Asteras. Afterwards, they prevailed over Doxa Vyronas, then Panetolikos and in the quarter-finals they easily eliminated Ethnikos Piraeus. In the semi-finals they faced Edessaikos who also they overcame with relative ease. Thus, AEK faced Panathinaikos at the Olympic Stadium on April 19, for the second consecutive season. AEK protested the decision to stage the final at that stadium arguing that it effectively served as Panathinaikos' home ground. In order to express their protest, AEK entered the pitch without their opponents and waited for Panathinaikos instead of making the customary joint entrance. Saravakos missed a penalty at the 6th minute and then a nervous match ended 0–0. In extra time, the pattern of the match remained unchanged and it appeared that the match would be decided for the second year in a row in the penalty shootout. However, the referee awarded Panathinaikos a penalty for a challenge by Vlachos on Warzycha at the 115th minute, which was strongly disputed by AEK, resulting in a mass confrontation, as players and club officials of the yellow-blacks surrounded the referee of the match. As a result, Manolas and Vlachos were sent off. At the same time, tensions also spread to the supporters of AEK in the stands and further crowd disturbances occurred outside the stadium. Eventually, Warzycha scored from the penalty spot and secured the trophy for Panathinaikos. In the aftermath of the episodic final, some players of AEK refused to attend the award ceremony, while a few days after the final the referee, Filippos Bakas, was attacked by unidentified assailants. Eventually, businessman Michalis Trochanas became the club's new owner.

Among the main players of the season for AEK were Saravakos, Savevski, Šabanadžović, Manolas, Kasapis, Atmatsidis, Tsiartas, Kostis and Dimitriadis. Saravakos was AEK's top scorer and the league's second-highest scorer with 21 goals.

== Management team ==
Position	Staff
Manager	(Bosnia and Herzegovina) Dušan Bajević
Assistant manager	(Greece) Petros Ravousis
Goalkeeping coach	(Greece) Stelios Serafidis
Fitness coach	(Greece) Dimitris Bouroutzikas
Academy director	(Greece) Andreas Stamatiadis
Academy manager	(Greece) Giorgos Karafeskos
Scout	(Greece) Aris Tsachouridis
Head of Medical	(Greece) Lakis Nikolaou

== Players ==
=== Squad information ===
NOTE: The players are the ones that have been announced by the AEK Athens' press release. No edits should be made unless a player arrival or exit is announced. Updated 3 June 1995, 23:59 UTC+3.

Player	Nat.	Position(s)	Date of birth (Age)	Signed	Previous club	Transfer fee	Contract until
Goalkeepers
Spyros Ikonomopoulos	(Greece)	GK	25 July 1959 (aged 35)	1979	(Greece) AEK Athens U20	—	1995
Ilias Atmatsidis	(Greece)	GK	24 April 1969 (aged 26)	1992	(Greece) Pontioi Veria	₯40,000,000	1996
Vasilis Karagiannis	(Greece)	GK	27 September 1969 (aged 25)	1993	(Greece) Diagoras	₯20,000,000	1998
Defenders
Stelios Manolas (Captain)	(Greece)	CB / RB	13 July 1961 (aged 33)	1980	(Greece) AEK Athens U20	—	1995
Georgios Agorogiannis	(Greece)	RB / RM / RW	3 May 1966 (aged 29)	1992	(Greece) AEL	₯35,000,000	1996
Georgios Koutoulas	(Greece)	CB / LB	9 February 1967 (aged 28)	1987	(Greece) AEK Athens U20	—	1996
Michalis Vlachos (Vice-captain 2)	(Greece)	CB / DM	20 September 1967 (aged 27)	1993	(Greece) Olympiacos	Free	1995
Manolis Papadopoulos	(Greece)	CB	22 April 1968 (aged 27)	1992	(Greece) Olympiacos	Free	1995
Vaios Karagiannis	(Greece)	LB / CB	25 June 1968 (aged 27)	1990	(Greece) A.O. Karditsa	₯11,000,000	1996
Vasilios Borbokis	(Greece)	RB / RM	10 February 1969 (aged 26)	1993	(Greece) Apollon Kalamarias	Free	1997
Charis Kopitsis	(Greece)	RB / RM / LB / LM	5 March 1969 (aged 26)	1992	(Greece) Panionios	Free	1997
Nikos Kostenoglou	(Greece)	CB / RB	3 October 1970 (aged 24)	1994	(Greece) Skoda Xanthi	₯70,000,000	1998
Michalis Kasapis	(Greece)	LB / LM	6 August 1971 (aged 23)	1993	(Greece) Levadiakos	₯25,000,000	1998
Midfielders
Toni Savevski	(North Macedonia)	CM / LM / DM	14 July 1963 (aged 31)	1988	(North Macedonia) Vardar	₯34,000,000	1996
Refik Šabanadžović	(Bosnia and Herzegovina) (Federal Republic of Yugoslavia)	DM / CM / CB / RB	2 August 1965 (aged 29)	1991	(Federal Republic of Yugoslavia) Red Star Belgrade	₯18,700,000	1996
Stavros Stamatis (Vice-captain)	(Greece)	DM / CM / CB / RB / LB / AM	31 January 1966 (aged 29)	1988	(Greece) Charavgiakos	₯22,000,000	1996
Temur Ketsbaia	(Georgia (country))	RM / LM / RW / LW / AM / CM	18 March 1968 (aged 27)	1994	(Cyprus) Anorthosis Famagusta	₯100,000,000	1995
Vasilios Tsiartas	(Greece)	AM / RM / LM / SS	12 November 1972 (aged 22)	1992	(Greece) Naoussa	₯70,000,000	1997
Forwards
Dimitris Saravakos	(Greece)	RW / LW / SS / AM	26 July 1961 (aged 33)	1994	(Greece) Panathinaikos	Free	1997
Vasilis Dimitriadis	(Greece)	ST	1 February 1966 (aged 29)	1991	(Greece) Aris	₯95,000,000	1996
Christos Kostis	(Greece)	SS / ST / AM / RW / LW	15 January 1972 (aged 23)	1994	(Greece) Iraklis	₯350,000,000	1998
From Reserve Squad
Fanouris Chalaris	(Greece)	CB / DM	25 August 1974 (aged 20)	—	(Greece) Perama	—	
Dimitris Konstantelos	(Greece)	CB	2 August 1975 (aged 19)	—	(Greece) AEK Athens U20	—	
Giorgos Ananiadis	(Greece)	LM / LB	16 October 1974 (aged 20)	—	(Greece) AEK Athens U20	—	
Giorgos Angelis	(Greece)	ST / SS / AM	18 August 1975 (aged 19)	—	(Greece) Olympiacos Assos	—	
Left during Winter Transfer Window
Stathis Karalagas	(Greece)	DM	19 June 1974 (aged 21)	1994	(Greece) AEK Athens U20	—	1997
Frank Klopas	(United States) (Greece)	SS / ST / AM	1 September 1966 (aged 28)	1988	(United States) Chicago Sting	Free	1994
Nikos Mirtsekis	(Greece)	ST	4 November 1968 (aged 26)	1994	(Greece) Panionios	Free	1997
Samouil Drakopulos	(Switzerland) (Greece)	ST / RW	31 July 1974 (aged 20)	1992	(Switzerland) Grasshopper	₯55,000,000	1996

== Transfers ==
=== In ===
==== Summer ====
Pos.	Player	From	Fee	Date	Contract Until	Source
DF	(Greece) Georgios Theodoridis	(Greece) Edessaikos	Loan return	1 July 1994	30 June 1995	
DF	(Greece) Nikos Kostenoglou	(Greece) Skoda Xanthi	₯70,000,000	15 June 1994	30 June 1998	
MF	(Greece) Stathis Karalagas	(Greece) AEK Athens U20	Promotion	1 July 1994	30 June 1997	
MF	(Georgia (country)) Temur Ketsbaia	(Cyprus) Anorthosis Famagusta	₯100,000,000	1 June 1994	30 June 1995	
FW	(Greece) Dimitris Saravakos	(Greece) Panathinaikos	Free transfer^{[a]}	1 July 1994	30 June 1997	
FW	(Greece) Christos Kostis	(Greece) Iraklis	₯350,000,000	31 May 1994	30 June 1998	
FW	(Greece) Nikos Mirtsekis	(Greece) Panionios	Free transfer^{[a]}	1 July 1994	30 June 1997	
FW	(Greece) Giorgos Kakousios	(Greece) Ethnikos Asteras	Loan return	1 July 1994	30 June 1994	

==== Winter ====
Pos.	Player	From	Fee	Date	Contract Until	Source
DF	(Greece) Andreas Theodoropoulos	(Greece) Proodeftiki	Loan return	1 December 1994	30 June 1998	

=== Out ===
==== Summer ====
Pos.	Player	To	Fee	Date	Source
MF	(Greece) Tasos Mitropoulos	(Greece) Panathinaikos	End of contract	22 July 1994	
FW	(Croatia) Zoran Slišković	(Greece) Paniliakos	Contract termination	17 June 1994	
FW	(Greece) Alexis Alexandris	(Greece) Olympiacos	End of contract^{[b]}	1 July 1994	
FW	(Greece) Giorgos Kakousios	(Greece) Ionikos	End of contract	4 July 1994	

==== Winter ====
Pos.	Player	To	Fee	Date	Source
DF	(Greece) Andreas Theodoropoulos	(Greece) Apollon Athens	Free transfer	16 December 1994	
FW	(Greece) Nikos Mirtsekis	(Greece) Iraklis	Free transfer^{[c]}	13 December 1994	

a. AEK paid the amount of ₯23,800,000 for the player's release.
b. AEK received the amount of ₯23,800,000 for the player's release.
c. AEK retains a buy-back option until July 1995.

=== Loan out ===
==== Summer ====
Pos.	Player	To	Fee	Date	Until	Option to buy	Source
DF	(Greece) Georgios Theodoridis	(Greece) Edessaikos	Free	25 July 1994	30 June 1995	✗	
MF	(Greece) Pantelis Konstantinidis	(Greece) Kavala	Free	4 July 1994	30 June 1995	✗	

==== Winter ====
Pos.	Player	To	Fee	Date	Until	Option to buy	Source
MF	(Greece) Stathis Karalagas	(Greece) Aiolikos	Free	12 December 1994	31 December 1995	✗	
FW	(Switzerland) Samouil Drakopulos	(Greece) PAS Giannina	Free	15 December 1994	31 December 1995	✗	

=== Overall transfer activity ===
==== Expenditure ====
Summer: ▼ ₯520,000,000

Winter: ▼ ₯0

Total: ▼ ₯520,000,000

==== Income ====
Summer: ▲ ₯0

Winter: ▲ ₯0

Total: ▲ ₯0

==== Net Totals ====
Summer: ▼ ₯520,000,000

Winter: ₯0

Total: ▼ ₯520,000,000

== Pre-season and friendlies ==
10 July 1994 Friendly	Herakles Munchen	0–5	AEK Athens
16:00 EEST (UTC+3)		Report	Kostis; Borbokis; Mirtsekis	Attendance: 2,000

16 July 1994 Friendly	Casino Salzburg	3–1	AEK Athens	Salzburg
19:00 EEST (UTC+3)	Mladenović 10'; Lainer (yellow card) 14'; Kocijan 31'; Artner 56'	Report	Tsiartas 35'	Stadium: Stadion Lehen; Attendance: 2,000; Referee: Raimund Haas (Austria)

17 July 1994 Friendly	Zeus Nurnberg	1–9	AEK Athens	Nuremberg
17:00 EEST (UTC+3)	Mortsinek 44'	Report	Ketsbaia 6'; Tsiartas (yellow card) 18', (goal) 37', 52'; Kostis 24', 30', 41'; Savevski 32'; Mirtsekis 71'; Karalagas 82'	Stadium: Frankenstadion; Attendance: 2,500

20 July 1994 Friendly	Pontos München	0–17	AEK Athens	Munich
20:30 EEST (UTC+3)		Report	Dimitriadis; Tsiartas; Borbokis; Agorogiannis; Šabanadžović; Mirtsekis; Kostis; Saravakos; Koutoulas

25 July 1994 Friendly	Anorthosis Famagusta	2–4	AEK Athens	Larnaca
20:00 EEST (UTC+3)	Panayiotou 18'; Šapurić 30'	Report	Saravakos 65'; Mirtsekis 71', 90'; Borbokis 81'	Stadium: Antonis Papadopoulos Stadium; Attendance: 20,000
Note: Friendly match as part of the transfer of Temur Ketsbaia.

28 July 1994 Friendly	AEK Athens	3–1	CSKA Sofia	Nea Filadelfeia
21:00 EEST (UTC+3)	Kostis 9', 35', (yellow card) 9'; Dimitriadis (penalty missed) 16, 31'; Šabanadžović (yellow card) 32'	Report	Zafirov (yellow card) 22'; Koilov (yellow card) 58', (goal) 73' (pen.)	Stadium: Nikos Goumas Stadium; Attendance: 20,000; Referee: Theodoros Kefalas (Athens)

1 August 1994 Friendly	AEK Athens	4–1	Iraklis	Nea Filadelfeia
21:00 EEST (UTC+3)	Saravakos 8'; C. Kostis 15'; Ketsbaia 54'; Borbokis 90' (pen.)	Report	G. Papadopoulos 40'	Stadium: Nikos Goumas Stadium; Referee: Vangelis Symiakos (Piraeus)
Note: Friendly match as part of the transfer of Christos Kostis.

3 August 1994 Friendly	AEK Athens	1–0	Skoda Xanthi	Nea Filadelfeia
21:00 EEST (UTC+3)	Kostis 23'; Vaios Karagiannis (yellow card) 68'	Report	Maladenis (yellow card) ?' (yellow-red card) 44'	Stadium: Nikos Goumas Stadium; Referee: Giorgos Spaneas (Athens)
Note: Friendly match as part of the transfer of Nikos Kostenoglou.

15 October 1994 Friendly	AEK Athens	7–2	Proodeftiki	Nea Filadelfeia
18:00 EEST (UTC+3)	Tsiartas 5', 11'; Saravakos 42'; Mirtsekis 46'; Dimitriadis 65', 68'; Papadopoulos 86'	Report	Dib 2', 10'	Stadium: Nikos Goumas Stadium; Attendance: 400; Referee: Dušan Bajević
Note: The referee was the manager of AEK, Dušan Bajević and the assistant referees were his assistant, Petros Ravousis and the fitness coach of Proodeftiki, Valeri Kislev.

== Competitions ==
=== Overall record ===
Competition	First match	Last match	Starting round	Final position	Record							
Competition	First match	Last match	Starting round	Final position	Pld	W	D	L	GF	GA	GD	Win %
Alpha Ethniki	28 August 1994	3 June 1995	Matchday 1	5th	34	17	11	6	61	33	+28	50.00
Greek Cup	20 August 1994	19 April 1995	Group Stage	Runners-up	13	12	0	1	27	5	+22	92.31
Greek Super Cup	17 August 1994		Final	Runners-up	1	0	0	1	0	3	−3	0.00
UEFA Champions League	10 August 1994	7 December 1994	Qualifying round	Group Stage	8	2	2	4	6	9	−3	25.00
Total					56	31	13	12	94	50	+44	55.36

Last updated: 3 June 1995
Source: Competitions

=== Alpha Ethniki ===
==== League table ====
Pos	Team	Pld	W	D	L	GF	GA	GD	Pts	Qualification or relegation
3	PAOK	34	20	5	9	55	29	+26	65	One-year ban from European competitions (Note: On 1 October 1992, PAOK vs Paris Saint-Germain UEFA Cup match was abandoned due to crowd violence and PAOK were punished with a two-year ban from all European competitions by the UEFA disciplinary committee. The sentence was later reduced to one year.)
4	Apollon Athens	34	20	3	11	61	37	+24	63	Qualification for UEFA Cup preliminary round
5	AEK Athens	34	17	11	6	61	33	+28	62	Qualification for Cup Winners' Cup first round (Note: Since Panathinaikos who were the 1994–95 Greek Football Cup winner, were qualified for the 1995–96 UEFA Champions League, the runner-up, AEK Athens took their place in the first round of the 1995–96 UEFA Cup Winners' Cup.)
6	Iraklis	34	18	8	8	55	36	+19	62	Qualification for Intertoto Cup group stage
7	Aris	34	19	5	10	46	34	+12	62	

Source: RSSSF
Rules for classification: 1st points; 2nd head-to-head points; 3rd head-to-head goal difference; 4th decision match.

==== Results summary ====
Overall								Home						Away					
Pld	W	D	L	GF	GA	GD	Pts	W	D	L	GF	GA	GD	W	D	L	GF	GA	GD
34	17	11	6	61	34	+27	62	11	4	2	42	15	+27	6	7	4	19	19	0

Source: Competitive matches

==== Results by Matchday ====
Round	1	2	3	4	5	6	7	8	9	10	11	12	13	14	15	16	17	18	19	20	21	22	23	24	25	26	27	28	29	30	31	32	33	34
Ground	H	A	H	H	A	H	A	H	A	H	A	A	H	A	H	A	H	A	H	A	A	H	A	H	A	H	A	H	H	A	H	A	H	A
Result	D	D	W	D	W	W	L	L	W	W	W	D	W	W	W	D	W	D	W	D	D	W	D	W	L	D	L	W	W	W	L	L	D	W
Position	10	13	7	8	6	4	5	7	5	5	4	5	3	3	3	3	3	3	2	2	2	2	2	2	3	3	3	3	3	2	2	5	5	5

Source: Competitive matches
A = Away; H = Home; W = Win; D = Draw; L = Loss; P = Postponed

==== Matches ====
28 August 1994 1	AEK Athens	0–0	Athinaikos	Nea Filadelfeia
17:30 EEST (UTC+3)	Tzalakostas (yellow card); Spinoulas (yellow card); Christinakis (yellow card)		Manolas (yellow card) 43'	Stadium: Nikos Goumas Stadium; Attendance: 14,242; Referee: Giorgos Likesas (Thessaloniki)

10 September 1994 2	Kavala	0–0	AEK Athens	Kavala
21:00 EEST (UTC+3)	Ignatiadis (yellow card) 64'		Vaios Karagiannis (yellow card) 49'	Stadium: Kavala National Stadium; Attendance: 7,035; Referee: Giannis Latsios (Larissa)

18 September 1994 3	AEK Athens	4–3	PAOK	Nea Filadelfeia
21:00 EEST (UTC+3)	Saravakos 5' (pen.), 45+1'; Šabanadžović (yellow card) 41'; Kostis 52', 56'; Vlachos (yellow card) 84'		Alexiou (yellow card) 34'; Kapetanopoulos 61'; Zouboulis 79'; Lagonidis 86' (pen.)	Stadium: Nikos Goumas Stadium; Attendance: 11,517; Referee: Giorgos Asteris (Elis)

24 September 1994 4	AEK Athens	1–1	Skoda Xanthi	Nea Filadelfeia
20:00 EEST (UTC+3)	Manolas (yellow card); Saravakos 59'		Vilanakis (yellow card); Vryzas (yellow card); Tengelidis (yellow card); Kechagias (yellow card); Marcelo 66' (pen.)	Stadium: Nikos Goumas Stadium; Attendance: 5,164; Referee: Filippos Bakas (Thessaloniki)

3 October 1994 5	Ethnikos Piraeus	0–2	AEK Athens	Piraeus
20:00 EEST (UTC+3)	Kamitsis (yellow card); Popović (yellow card) (yellow-red card); Kapsis (yellow card); Xanthis (yellow card); Bougas (yellow card) (yellow-red card)		Kopitsis (yellow card); Šabanadžović (yellow card); Saravakos 48', 77'	Stadium: Karaiskakis Stadium; Attendance: 13,760; Referee: Gerasimos Mazarakis (Kefalonia)

26 October 1994 6	AEK Athens	4–1	Iraklis	Nea Filadelfeia
15:00 EEST (UTC+3)	C. Kostis 10'; Vlachos 27'; Kopitsis 42'; Savevski 59'		D. Papadopoulos 88' (pen.)	Stadium: Nikos Goumas Stadium; Attendance: 7,390; Referee: Panagiotis Perloretzos (Piraeus)

29 October 1994 7	Levadiakos	2–1	AEK Athens	Livadeia
15:00 EEST (UTC+3)	Kojic 15', (yellow card) 16'; Goulis (yellow card) 22' (yellow-red card) 72'; Markou 60'; Martinaios (yellow card) 78'		Savevski (yellow card) 19'; Vlachos (yellow card) 27'; Kostis 63'; Tsiartas (yellow card) 74'	Stadium: Levadia Municipal Stadium; Attendance: 4,680; Referee: Giorgos Asteris (Elis)

7 November 1994 8	AEK Athens	0–1	Panathinaikos	Nea Filadelfeia
20:00 EET (UTC+2)	Vaios Karagiannis (yellow card)		Christodoulou (yellow card); Marangos (yellow card); Nioplias (yellow card); Kalitzakis 20', (yellow card)	Stadium: Nikos Goumas Stadium; Attendance: 19,506; Referee: Panagiotis Konstantinidis (Piraeus)

19 November 1994 9	Olympiacos	0–1	AEK Athens	Piraeus
20:00 EET (UTC+2)			Ketsbaia (yellow card) 22', (goal) 38'; Savevski (yellow card) 32'; Vlachos (yellow card) 82'	Stadium: Karaiskakis Stadium; Attendance: 16,354; Referee: Theodoros Tsimenteridis (Kozani)

27 November 1994 10	AEK Athens	3–1	Aris	Nea Filadelfeia
21:00 EET (UTC+2)	Savevski (yellow card) 32', (goal) 52' (pen.); Borbokis 74'; Kostis 90+1'; Vlachos (red card) 90+6'		Konstantinidis (yellow card) 7' (yellow-red card) 57'; Milojević 59'; Mavrogenidis (yellow card) 81'; Sapountzis (yellow card) 87'	Stadium: Nikos Goumas Stadium; Attendance: 3,096; Referee: Manolis Papatriantafyllou (Kilkis)

3 December 1994 11	Panionios	2–3	AEK Athens	Nea Smyrni
15:00 EET (UTC+2)	Mantzios (yellow card); Fyssas (yellow card); Pantić 52'; Kourbanas 81', (yellow card); Kleisaris (red card) 90'		Manolas (yellow card); Kasapis (yellow card); Ketsbaia 49'; Dimitriadis 57'; Saravakos 79'	Stadium: Nea Smyrni Stadium; Attendance: 5,869; Referee: Michalis Kalathenos (Dodecanese)

11 December 1994 12	AEL	0–0	AEK Athens	Larissa
20:30 EET (UTC+2)				Stadium: Alcazar Stadium; Attendance: 4,254; Referee: Thanasis Zachariadis (Thessaloniki)

27 December 1994 13	AEK Athens	5–1	Doxa Drama	Nea Filadelfeia
20:00 EET (UTC+2)	Vlachos (yellow card); Ketsbaia 4'; Dimitriadis 10', 71', (yellow card); Saravakos 11'; Kostis 80'		Terzis (yellow card); Aleksić (yellow card); Pachatouridis (yellow card) (yellow-red card) 57'; Kosmidis (yellow card); Chionas 70', (yellow card)	Stadium: Nikos Goumas Stadium; Attendance: 3,876; Referee: Stelios Charlavanis (Euboea)

7 January 1995 14	Apollon Athens	1–2	AEK Athens	Rizoupoli
15:00 EET (UTC+2)	Theodoropoulos (yellow card); Mitropoulos (yellow card); Alexis (yellow card); Ioannou (yellow card); Lachanas (yellow card); Barnjak 48'		Manolas (yellow card); Borbokis (yellow card); Savevski (yellow card); Kopitsis (yellow card); Ketsbaia 49'; Kostis 84'	Stadium: Rizoupoli Stadium; Attendance: 9,299; Referee: Dimitris Koumasis (Athens)

15 January 1995 15	AEK Athens	5–2	Edessaikos	Nea Filadelfeia
15:00 EET (UTC+2)	Dimitriadis 17'; Saravakos 23', 83'; Kostis 35', 53'		Nasiopoulos (yellow card); Kolev 74'; S. Borbokis 80'	Stadium: Nikos Goumas Stadium; Attendance: 5,499; Referee: Giannis Spathas (Piraeus)

21 January 1995 16	Ionikos	0–0	AEK Athens	Nikaia
15:00 EET (UTC+2)	Sidiropoulos (yellow card); Antić (yellow card); Kourkounas (yellow card); Xanthopoulos (yellow card)		Šabanadžović (yellow card)	Stadium: Neapoli Stadium; Attendance: 4,654; Referee: Thanasis Zachariadis (Thessaloniki)

29 January 1995 17	AEK Athens	4–0	OFI	Nea Filadelfeia
15:00 EET (UTC+2)	Tsiartas (yellow card); Kopitsis (yellow card); Manolas (yellow card); Saravakos 13', 19', 65' (pen.); Dimitriadis 26'		Thomaidis (yellow card); Konstantinidis (yellow card)	Stadium: Nikos Goumas Stadium; Attendance: 14,717; Referee: Panagiotis Konstantinidis (Piraeus)

4 February 1995 18	Athinaikos	0–0	AEK Athens	Vyronas
15:00 EET (UTC+2)	Chatziangelis (yellow card); Monos (yellow card); Zotalis (yellow card)		Vlachos (yellow card) 75' (yellow-red card) 82'	Stadium: Vyronas National Stadium; Attendance: 4,050; Referee: Ilias Chatzis (Karditsa)

12 February 1995 19	AEK Athens	3–0	Kavala	Nea Filadelfeia
15:30 EET (UTC+2)	Kostenoglou (yellow card); Saravakos 56'; Dimitriadis 58'; Kasapis 61'		Nikolaidis (yellow card) (yellow-red card) 49'	Stadium: Nikos Goumas Stadium; Attendance: 6,356; Referee: Giorgos Asteris (Elis)

19 February 1995 20	PAOK	1–1	AEK Athens	Thessaloniki
20:30 EET (UTC+2)	Anastasiadis (yellow card); Lagonidis (yellow card); Kapetanopoulos (yellow card); Alexiou (yellow card); Van Rooy 53'		Vaios Karagiannis (yellow card); Savevski (yellow card); Kasapis (yellow card); Kostis 28'	Stadium: Toumba Stadium; Attendance: 13,509; Referee: Spyros Papadakos (Laconia)

25 February 1995 21	Skoda Xanthi	1–1	AEK Athens	Xanthi
15:00 EET (UTC+2)	Maladenis (yellow card); Panou 65'		Kostis (yellow card); Dimitriadis (yellow card); Manolas 55', (yellow card)	Stadium: A.O. Xanthi Stadium; Attendance: 5,955; Referee: Spyros Papadakos (Laconia)

5 March 1995 22	AEK Athens	2–1	Ethnikos Piraeus	Nea Filadelfeia
15:30 EET (UTC+2)	Šabanadžović (yellow card); Saravakos 4' (pen.), 67'		Bougas (yellow card); Xanthis (yellow card); Tsiotras (yellow card); Kamitsis 76'	Stadium: Nikos Goumas Stadium; Attendance: 4,749; Referee: Vassilios Nikakis (Aetoloacarnania)

12 March 1995 23	Iraklis	3–3	AEK Athens	Thessaloniki
15:45 EET (UTC+2)	Andreadis 17', 55', (yellow card); Mirtsekis 50'; Jovanović (penalty missed) 90+1'		Ketsbaia (yellow card); Stamatis (yellow card); Saravakos 48', 82'; Agorogiannis 71', (yellow card) 90'	Stadium: Kaftanzoglio Stadium; Attendance: 5,867; Referee: Thanasis Vellios (Xanthi)

19 March 1995 24	AEK Athens	4–0	Levadiakos	Nea Filadelfeia
15:45 EET (UTC+2)	Tsiartas 5'; Kostis 50'; Saravakos 86'; Agorogiannis 87', (yellow card)		Goulis (yellow card); Bonovas (yellow card); Meidanis (yellow card) 26'; Tsanas (yellow card) 90'	Stadium: Nikos Goumas Stadium; Attendance: 6,043; Referee: Giorgos Bikas (Chalkidiki)

25 March 1995 25	Panathinaikos	3–0	AEK Athens	Marousi
16:00 EET (UTC+2)	Kapouranis 12', (yellow card); Vlachos 13' (o.g.); G. Ch. Georgiadis (yellow card) 24'; Ouzounidis (yellow card) 36'; Warzycha 86'		Kasapis (yellow card); Tsiartas (yellow card); Manolas (yellow card) 4' (yellow-red card) 63'	Stadium: Olympic Stadium; Attendance: 32,336; Referee: Argyris Papachintzios (Thessaloniki)

1 April 1995 26	AEK Athens	2–2	Olympiacos	Nea Filadelfeia
19:30 EEST (UTC+3)	Vaios Karagiannis (yellow card) 6'; Saravakos 17' (pen.); Stamatis 78'; Tsiartas (yellow card) 82'		Dabizas (yellow card) 35'; Batista 43', 60', (penalty missed) 52'; Tsalouchidis (yellow card) 81'	Stadium: Nikos Goumas Stadium; Attendance: 12,397; Referee: Alexandros Naziris (Thessaloniki)

9 April 1995 27	Aris	2–1	AEK Athens	Thessaloniki
17:00 EEST (UTC+3)	Ivan (yellow card) 86'; Stratilatis 86'; Lončar 90', (yellow card) 90'		Kasapis (yellow card) 22' (yellow-red card) 37'; Saravakos 24'	Stadium: Aris Stadium; Attendance: 14,934; Referee: Gerasimos Mazarakis (Kefalonia)

15 April 1995 28	AEK Athens	2–0	Panionios	Nea Filadelfeia
17:00 EEST (UTC+3)	Saravakos (penalty missed) 24'; Savevski 36'; Kopitsis (yellow card) 51'; Koutoulas (yellow card) 58'; Dimitriadis 79'		Vokolos (yellow card) 31'	Stadium: Nikos Goumas Stadium; Attendance: 3,673; Referee: Sotiris Vorgias (Athens)

30 April 1995 29	AEK Athens	2–0	AEL	Nea Filadelfeia
17:00 EEST (UTC+3)	Vaios Karagiannis (yellow card) 27'; Saravakos 40'; Tsiartas 70'		Nasiakos (yellow card)	Stadium: Nikos Goumas Stadium; Attendance: 3,405; Referee: Savvas Chatzistavridis (Patra)

10 May 1995 30	Doxa Drama	0–1	AEK Athens	Drama
17:00 EET	Krstović (yellow card)		Agorogiannis (yellow card); Kasapis (yellow card) 6'; Ketsbaia 73'	Stadium: Doxa Drama Stadium; Attendance: 1,751; Referee: Panagiotis Perloretzos (Piraeus)

14 May 1995 31	AEK Athens	1–2	Apollon Athens	Nea Filadelfeia
17:00 EEST (UTC+3)	Kostis (yellow card) 7'; Tsiartas 79' (pen.)		Mitropoulos (yellow card) 14'; Kefalas (yellow card) 22'; Kola 63'; Barnjak 73' (pen.)	Stadium: Nikos Goumas Stadium; Attendance: 5,017; Referee: Giorgos Plevritis (Thessaloniki)

21 May 1995 32	Edessaikos	2–1	AEK Athens	Edessa
17:00 EEST (UTC+3)	Kastaniotis (yellow card); Deligiannis (yellow card); Čolaković 29'; Nasiopoulos 65'		Kostenoglou (yellow card); Borbokis (yellow card); M. Papadopoulos (yellow card); Tsiartas 58'	Stadium: Municipal Stadium of Edessa; Attendance: 1,692; Referee: Gerasimos Mazarakis (Kefalonia)

27 May 1995 33	AEK Athens	0–0	Ionikos	Nea Filadelfeia
17:00 EEST (UTC+3)	Vaios Karagiannis (yellow card); Kopitsis (yellow card); Stamatis (yellow card)		Leontiadis (yellow card); Ottiji (yellow card); Sidiropoulos (yellow card)	Stadium: Nikos Goumas Stadium; Attendance: Behind closed doors Referee: Argyris Papachintzios (Thessaloniki)

3 June 1995 34	OFI	1–2	AEK Athens	Heraklion
20:00 EEST (UTC+3)	Moutas 75' (pen.)		Tsiartas 68' (pen.); Dimitriadis 89'	Stadium: Theodoros Vardinogiannis Stadium; Attendance: 3,115; Referee: Giannis Latsios (Larissa)

=== Greek Cup ===
==== Group 1 ====
Pos	Team	Pld	W	D	L	GF	GA	GD	Pts	Qualification	AEK	PAN	ATR	KAS	ETH
1	AEK Athens	4	4	0	0	8	0	+8	12	Round of 32		1–0	4–0	—	—
2	Panargiakos	4	2	1	1	7	2	+5	7	Round of 32	—		4–0	—	3–1
3	Atromitos	4	2	0	2	3	8	−5	6		—	—		1–0	2–0
4	Kastoria	4	0	2	2	2	4	−2	2		0–1	0–0	—		—
5	Ethnikos Asteras	4	0	1	3	3	9	−6	1		0–2	—	—	2–2	

Source: epo.gr

==== Matches ====
20 August 1994 1	Ethnikos Asteras	0–2	AEK Athens	Kaisariani
20:30 EEST (UTC+3)		Report	Manolas 64'; Dimitriadis 74'	Stadium: Michalis Kritikopoulos Stadium; Attendance: 5,000; Referee: Christos Zarzavatsakis (Athens)

31 August 1994 2	AEK Athens	1–0	Panargiakos	Nea Filadelfeia
21:00 EEST (UTC+3)	Dimitriadis (penalty missed) 26'; Mirtsekis 63'	Report	Boukaras (yellow card)	Stadium: Nikos Goumas Stadium; Attendance: 3,000; Referee: Manolis Papatriantafyllou (Kilkis)

21 September 1994 3	AEK Athens	4–0	Atromitos	Nea Filadelfeia
20:00 EEST (UTC+3)	Tsiartas 14'; Dimitriadis 32'; Vaios Karagiannis 49'; Mirtsekis 90'	Report		Stadium: Nikos Goumas Stadium; Attendance: 4,000; Referee: Dimitris Bentas (Trikala)

11 October 1994 4	Kastoria	0–1	AEK Athens	Kastoria
15:30 EEST (UTC+3)			Dimitriadis 87'	Stadium: Municipal Stadium of Kastoria; Attendance: 4,000; Referee: Naoum Mintiouris (Serres)

===== Round of 32 =====
12 November 1994 First leg	Doxa Vyronas	1–3	AEK Athens	Vyronas
15:00 EET (UTC+2)	Moustakas 88'	Report	Dimitriadis 5'; Ketsbaia 52'; Mirtsekis 86'	Stadium: Vyronas National Stadium; Referee: Zacharias Kalogiannakis (Heraklion)

30 November 1994 Second leg	AEK Athens	2–1 (5–2 agg.)	Doxa Vyronas	Nea Filadelfeia
14:30 EET (UTC+2)	Borbokis 28'; Tsiartas 47' (pen.)	Report	Dotsis 60'	Stadium: Nikos Goumas Stadium; Attendance: 539; Referee: Michalis Kalathenos (Dodecanese)

===== Round of 16 =====
21 December 1994 First leg	AEK Athens	4–1	Panetolikos	Nea Filadelfeia
15:00 EET (UTC+2)	Kostenoglou (yellow card); Saravakos 15'; Dimitriadis 25', (penalty missed) 34'; Tsiartas 40' (pen.), (yellow card); Ketsbaia 54'	Report	Tzachristos 46'	Stadium: Nikos Goumas Stadium; Referee: Savvas Chatzistavridis (Patra)

18 January 1995 Second leg	Panetolikos	0–5 (1–9 agg.)	AEK Athens	Agrinio
14:30 EET (UTC+2)		Report	Ketsbaia 50'; Dimitriadis 55', 63'; Saravakos 81', 86'	Stadium: Panetolikos Stadium; Attendance: 8,000; Referee: Argyris Papachintzios (Thessaloniki)

===== Quarter-finals =====
22 February 1995 First leg	Ethnikos Piraeus	0–1	AEK Athens	Piraeus
15:45 EET (UTC+2)	Tsiotras (yellow card)	Report	Tsiartas 2'	Stadium: Karaiskakis Stadium; Attendance: 5,000; Referee: Thanasis Zachariadis (Thessaloniki)

1 March 1995 Second leg	AEK Athens	2–1 (3–1 agg.)	Ethnikos Piraeus	Nea Filadelfeia
15:15 EET (UTC+2)	Ketsbaia 4'; Dimitriadis 49'	Report	Papapanagis (yellow card); Niniadis 85'	Stadium: Nikos Goumas Stadium; Attendance: 2,000; Referee: Thanasis Vellios (Xanthi)

===== Semi-finals =====
15 March 1995 First leg	AEK Athens	1–0	Edessaikos	Nea Filadelfeia
15:45 EET (UTC+2)	Kasapis (yellow card); Šabanadžović (yellow card); Vlachos (yellow card) (yellow-red card) 67'; Manolas 14'	Report	Deligiannis (yellow card); Theodoridis (yellow card); Rabušic (yellow card); Tsoptsis (yellow card); Kastaniotis (yellow card) (yellow-red card) 90+3'; Tsoptsis (yellow card); Alexandridis (yellow card)	Stadium: Nikos Goumas Stadium; Attendance: 5,874; Referee: Giorgos Plevritis (Thessaloniki)

22 March 1995 Second leg	Edessaikos	0–1 (0–2 agg.)	AEK Athens	Edessa
15:15 EET (UTC+2)	Koutsoures (yellow card); Ladias (yellow card); Čolaković (yellow card)	Report	Dimitriadis (yellow card); Savevski (yellow card); Stamatis 86'	Stadium: Municipal Stadium of Edessa; Attendance: 4,331; Referee: Giorgos Borovilos (Arcadia)

===== Final =====
19 April 1995 Final	Panathinaikos	1–0 (a.e.t.)	AEK Athens	Marousi
20:00 EEST (UTC+3)	Wandzik (yellow card) 45'; Borrelli (yellow card) 86'; Kolitsidakis (yellow card) 88'; Warzycha 118' (pen.)	Report (page 4)	Saravakos (penalty missed) 14'; Papadopoulos (yellow card) 26'; Vlachos (yellow card) 44'; Dimitriadis (yellow card) 45'; Šabanadžović (yellow card) 59'; Vlachos (red card) 115'; Manolas (red card) 115'	Stadium: Olympic Stadium; Attendance: 60,777; Referee: Filippos Bakas (Thessaloniki)

=== Greek Super Cup ===
17 August 1994 Final	AEK Athens	0–3	Panathinaikos	Marousi
21:00 EEST (UTC+3)	Borbokis (yellow card) 39'; Tsiartas (yellow card) 53'; Kasapis (yellow card) 72'; Koutoulas (yellow card) 76'	Report	Ouzounidis 30'; Apostolakis 76' (pen.), (yellow card) 79'; Markos 86'	Stadium: Olympic Stadium; Attendance: 15,457; Referee: Thanasis Zachariadis (Thessaloniki)

=== UEFA Champions League ===
==== Qualifying round ====
The draw for the qualifying round as well as group formations was held on 20 July 1994. The knockout phase pairs were made automatically by a predetermined bracket.

10 August 1994 First leg	AEK Athens (Greece)	2–0	(Scotland) Rangers	Athens, Greece
21:00 EEST (UTC+3)	Saravakos 44', 65'; Savevski (yellow card) 83'	Report	Robertson (yellow card) 37'; Hateley (yellow card) 50'; Pressley (yellow card) 56'	Stadium: Nikos Goumas Stadium; Attendance: 21,994; Referee: Peter Mikkelsen (Denmark)

24 August 1994 Second leg	Rangers (Scotland)	0–1 (0–3 agg.)	(Greece) AEK Athens	Glasgow, Scotland
22:00 EEST (UTC+3)	Ferguson (yellow card) 4'; Boli (yellow card) 50'	Report	Vlachos (yellow card) 13'; Savevski 43'; Šabanadžović (yellow card) 69'	Stadium: Ibrox Stadium; Attendance: 44,789; Referee: Leif Sundell (Sweden)

==== Group stage ====
Pos	Team	Pld	W	D	L	GF	GA	GD	Pts	Qualification	AJX	MIL	SAL	AEK
1	(Netherlands) Ajax	6	4	2	0	9	2	+7	10	Advance to knockout stage	—	2–0	1–1	2–0
2	(Italy) Milan	6	3	1	2	6	5	+1	5 (Note: Milan were docked two points for crowd trouble against Casino Salzburg on matchday 2. This occurred after Casino Salzburg goalkeeper Otto Konrad was hit on the head with a plastic bottle thrown from the stands, sustaining an injury for which he had to be substituted and taken to the hospital.)	Advance to knockout stage	0–2	—	3–0	2–1
3	(Austria) Casino Salzburg	6	1	3	2	4	6	−2	5		0–0	0–1	—	0–0
4	(Greece) AEK Athens	6	0	2	4	3	9	−6	2		1–2	0–0	1–3	—

Source: UEFA

===== Matches =====
14 September 1994 1	Casino Salzburg (Austria)	0–0	(Greece) AEK Athens	Vienna, Austria
21:30 EEST (UTC+3)	Artner (yellow card) 38'; Stadler (yellow card) 65'	Report	Šabanadžović (yellow card) 56'	Stadium: Ernst-Happel-Stadion; Attendance: 22,500; Referee: Rémi Harrel (France)

28 September 1994 2	AEK Athens (Greece)	1–2	(Netherlands) Ajax	Athens, Greece
21:30 EEST (UTC+3)	Savevski 30'; Vaios Karagiannis (yellow card) 73'; Dimitriadis (yellow card) 80'; Manolas (yellow card) 88'	Report	Blind (yellow card) 11'; Litmanen 33'; Kluivert 59'; George (yellow card) 71'	Stadium: Nikos Goumas Stadium; Attendance: 24,747; Referee: Markus Merk (Germany)

19 October 1994 3	AEK Athens (Greece)	0–0	(Italy) Milan	Athens, Greece
21:30 EEST (UTC+3)		Report	Boban (yellow card) 16'	Stadium: Nikos Goumas Stadium; Attendance: 19,699; Referee: Sándor Puhl (Hungary)

2 November 1994 4	Milan (Italy)	2–1	(Greece) AEK Athens	Trieste, Italy
20:30 EET (UTC+2)	Panucci 68', 74', (yellow card) 27'	Report	Savevski 16', (yellow card) 17'; Manolas (yellow card) 23' (yellow-red card) 87'	Stadium: Stadio Nereo Rocco; Attendance: 17,264; Referee: Vadim Zhuk (Belarus)

23 November 1994 5	AEK Athens (Greece)	1–3	(Austria) Casino Salzburg	Athens, Greece
21:30 EET (UTC+2)	Vlachos 28'; Vaios Karagiannis (yellow card) 50'; Koutoulas (yellow card) 70'; Šabanadžović (yellow card) 81'	Report	Pfeifenberger 7', 9', (yellow card) 40'; Hasenhüttl (yellow card) 52', (goal) 77'	Stadium: Nikos Goumas Stadium; Attendance: 10,000; Referee: Guy Goethals (Belgium)

7 December 1994 6	Ajax (Netherlands)	2–0	(Greece) AEK Athens	Amsterdam, Netherlands
21:30 EET (UTC+2)	Oulida 7', 81'	Report		Stadium: Olympisch Stadion; Attendance: 39,138; Referee: Jorge Coroado (Portugal)

== Statistics ==
=== Squad statistics ===
As of 3 June 1995

No.	Pos	Player	Alpha Ethniki		Greek Cup		Greek Super Cup		Champions League		Total	
No.	Pos	Player	Apps	Goals	Apps	Goals	Apps	Goals	Apps	Goals	Apps	Goals
Goalkeepers
—	GK	(Greece) Spyros Ikonomopoulos	0	0	0	0	0	0	0	0	0	0
—	GK	(Greece) Ilias Atmatsidis	29	0	5	0	1	0	8	0	43	0
—	GK	(Greece) Vasilis Karagiannis	5	0	8	0	0	0	0	0	13	0
Defenders
—	DF	(Greece) Stelios Manolas	23	1	10	2	0	0	6	0	39	3
—	DF	(Greece) Georgios Agorogiannis	16	2	8	0	0	0	8	0	32	2
—	DF	(Greece) Georgios Koutoulas	12	0	5	0	1	0	2	0	20	0
—	DF	(Greece) Michalis Vlachos	20	1	7	0	1	0	8	1	36	2
—	DF	(Greece) Manolis Papadopoulos	25	0	11	0	0	0	4	0	40	0
—	DF	(Greece) Vaios Karagiannis	18	0	9	1	0	0	4	0	31	1
—	DF	(Greece) Vasilios Borbokis	11	1	5	1	1	0	2	0	19	2
—	DF	(Greece) Charis Kopitsis	27	1	12	0	1	0	7	0	47	1
—	DF	(Greece) Nikos Kostenoglou	15	0	8	0	1	0	0	0	24	0
—	DF	(Greece) Michalis Kasapis	25	1	8	0	1	0	8	0	42	1
Midfielders
—	MF	(North Macedonia) Toni Savevski	23	3	6	0	1	0	6	3	36	6
—	MF	(Republic of Bosnia and Herzegovina) Refik Šabanadžović	27	0	4	0	1	0	6	0	38	0
—	MF	(Greece) Stavros Stamatis	14	1	9	1	1	0	2	0	26	2
—	MF	(Georgia (country)) Temur Ketsbaia	22	5	7	4	0	0	5	0	34	9
—	MF	(Greece) Vasilios Tsiartas	28	5	9	4	1	0	8	0	46	9
Forwards
—	FW	(Greece) Dimitris Saravakos	30	21	10	3	0	0	8	2	48	26
—	FW	(Greece) Vasilis Dimitriadis	29	8	11	8	1	0	2	0	43	16
—	FW	(Greece) Christos Kostis	31	11	9	0	1	0	8	0	49	11
From Reserve Squad
—	DF	(Greece) Fanouris Chalaris	1	0	0	0	0	0	0	0	1	0
—	DF	(Greece) Dimitris Konstantelos	1	0	0	0	0	0	0	0	1	0
—	MF	(Greece) Giorgos Ananiadis	2	0	0	0	0	0	0	0	2	0
—	FW	(Greece) Giorgos Angelis	3	0	0	0	0	0	0	0	3	0
Left during Winter Transfer Window
—	MF	(Greece) Stathis Karalagas	2	0	0	0	0	0	0	0	2	0
—	FW	(United States) Frank Klopas	0	0	0	0	0	0	0	0	0	0
—	FW	(Greece) Nikos Mirtsekis	2	0	4	3	0	0	1	0	7	3
—	FW	(Switzerland) Samouil Drakopulos	0	0	2	0	0	0	0	0	2	0

=== Goalscorers ===
As of 3 June 1995
The list is sorted by competition order when total goals are equal, then by position and then alphabetically by surname.

Rank	Pos.	Player	Alpha Ethniki	Greek Cup	Greek Super Cup	Champions League	Total
1	FW	(Greece) Dimitris Saravakos	21	3	0	2	26
2	FW	(Greece) Vasilis Dimitriadis	8	8	0	0	16
3	FW	(Greece) Christos Kostis	11	0	0	0	11
4	MF	(Georgia (country)) Temur Ketsbaia	5	4	0	0	9
4	MF	(Greece) Vasilios Tsiartas	5	4	0	0	9
6	MF	(North Macedonia) Toni Savevski	3	0	0	3	6
7	DF	(Greece) Stelios Manolas	1	2	0	0	3
7	FW	(Greece) Nikos Mirtsekis	0	3	0	0	3
9	DF	(Greece) Georgios Agorogiannis	2	0	0	0	2
9	DF	(Greece) Vasilios Borbokis	1	1	0	0	2
9	MF	(Greece) Stavros Stamatis	1	1	0	0	2
9	DF	(Greece) Michalis Vlachos	1	0	0	1	2
13	DF	(Greece) Charis Kopitsis	1	0	0	0	1
13	DF	(Greece) Michalis Kasapis	1	0	0	0	1
13	DF	(Greece) Vaios Karagiannis	0	1	0	0	1
Own goals			0	0	0	0	0
Totals			61	27	0	6	94

=== Hat-tricks ===
Numbers in superscript represent the goals that the player scored.

Player	Against	Result	Date	Competition	Source
(Greece) Dimitris Saravakos	(Greece) OFI	4–0 (H)	29 January 1995	Alpha Ethniki	

=== Assists ===
As of 3 June 1995
The list is sorted by competition order when total assists are equal, then by position and then alphabetically by surname.

Rank	Pos.	Player	Alpha Ethniki	Greek Cup	Greek Super Cup	Champions League	Total
1	MF	(Greece) Vasilios Tsiartas	7	7	0	4	18
2	MF	(North Macedonia) Toni Savevski	8	1	0	0	9
3	FW	(Greece) Dimitris Saravakos	8	0	0	0	8
4	DF	(Greece) Michalis Kasapis	4	0	0	0	4
4	DF	(Greece) Charis Kopitsis	2	2	0	0	4
6	FW	(Greece) Christos Kostis	3	0	0	0	3
6	FW	(Greece) Vasilis Dimitriadis	2	1	0	0	3
6	ΜF	(Georgia (country)) Temur Ketsbaia	0	3	0	0	3
9	DF	(Greece) Vaios Karagiannis	1	1	0	0	2
9	DF	(Greece) Georgios Agorogiannis	0	2	0	0	2
11	DF	(Greece) Georgios Koutoulas	1	0	0	0	1
11	DF	(Greece) Vasilios Borbokis	1	0	0	0	1
11	MF	(Bosnia and Herzegovina) Refik Šabanadžović	1	0	0	0	1
11	DF	(Greece) Nikos Kostenoglou	0	1	0	0	1
11	DF	(Greece) Stelios Manolas	0	1	0	0	1
Totals			38	19	0	4	61

=== Clean sheets ===
As of 3 June 1995
The list is sorted by competition order when total clean sheets are equal and then alphabetically by surname. Clean sheets in games where both goalkeepers participated are awarded to the goalkeeper who started the game. Goalkeepers with no appearances are not included.

Rank	Player	Alpha Ethniki	Greek Cup	Greek Super Cup	Champions League	Total
1	(Greece) Ilias Atmatsidis	12	4	0	4	20
2	(Greece) Vasilis Karagiannis	2	4	0	0	6
Totals		14	8	0	4	26

=== Disciplinary record ===
As of 3 June 1995

N	P	Nat.	Name	Alpha Ethniki			Greek Cup			Greek Super Cup			Champions League			Total			Notes
N	P	Nat.	Name	Yellow card	Second yellow card	Red card	Yellow card	Second yellow card	Red card	Yellow card	Second yellow card	Red card	Yellow card	Second yellow card	Red card	Yellow card	Second yellow card	Red card	Notes
Goalkeepers
—	GK	(Greece)	Spyros Ikonomopoulos																
—	GK	(Greece)	Ilias Atmatsidis																
—	GK	(Greece)	Vasilis Karagiannis																
Defenders
—	DF	(Greece)	Stelios Manolas	7	1				1				2	1		9	2	1	
—	DF	(Greece)	Georgios Agorogiannis	3												3			
—	DF	(Greece)	Georgios Koutoulas	1						1			1			3			
—	DF	(Greece)	Michalis Vlachos	5	1	1	1	1	1				1			7	2	2	
—	DF	(Greece)	Manolis Papadopoulos	1			1									2			
—	DF	(Greece)	Vaios Karagiannis	6			2									8			
—	DF	(Greece)	Vasilios Borbokis	2						1						3			
—	DF	(Greece)	Charis Kopitsis	5												5			
—	DF	(Greece)	Nikos Kostenoglou	2			1									3			
—	DF	(Greece)	Michalis Kasapis	5	1		1			1						7	1		
Midfielders
—	MF	(North Macedonia)	Toni Savevski	5			1						2			8			
—	MF	(Republic of Bosnia and Herzegovina)	Refik Šabanadžović	4			2						3			9			
—	MF	(Greece)	Stavros Stamatis	2												2			
—	MF	(Georgia (country))	Temur Ketsbaia	2												2			
—	MF	(Greece)	Vasilios Tsiartas	4			1			1						6			
Forwards
—	FW	(Greece)	Dimitris Saravakos																
—	FW	(Greece)	Vasilis Dimitriadis	2			2						1			5			
—	FW	(Greece)	Christos Kostis	2												2			
From Reserve Squad
—	DF	(Greece)	Fanouris Chalaris																
—	DF	(Greece)	Dimitris Konstantelos																
—	MF	(Greece)	Giorgos Ananiadis																
—	FW	(Greece)	Giorgos Angelis																
Left during Winter Transfer window
—	DF	(Greece)	Andreas Theodoropoulos																
—	MF	(Greece)	Stathis Karalagas																
—	FW	(United States)	Frank Klopas																
—	FW	(Greece)	Nikos Mirtsekis																
—	FW	(Switzerland)	Samouil Drakopulos																

=== Starting 11 ===
This section presents the most frequently used formation along with the players with the most starts across all competitions.

N.	Formation	Matchday(s)
56	3–5–2	1–34

Nat.	Player	Pos.
(Greece)	Ilias Atmatsidis	GK
(Greece)	Stelios Manolas (C)	RCB
(Greece)	Manolis Papadopoulos	CB
(Greece)	Michalis Vlachos	LCB
(Bosnia and Herzegovina)	Refik Šabanadžović	RDM
(North Macedonia)	Toni Savevski	LDM
(Greece)	Charis Kopitsis	RM
(Greece)	Michalis Kasapis	LM
(Greece)	Vasilios Tsiartas	AM
(Greece)	Christos Kostis	LCF
(Greece)	Dimitris Saravakos	RCF

Last updated: 1995-06-03

== Awards ==
Player	Pos.	Award	Source
(Greece) Michalis Kasapis	DF	Greek Player of the Season (shared)	
