= 1998 Greek Football Cup final =

1998 Greek Cup final
- Event: 1997–98 Greek Football Cup
Panionios	Panathinaikos
1	0
- Date: 29 April 1998
- Venue: Karaiskakis Stadium, Piraeus
- Referee: Giorgos Borovilos (Arcadia)
- Attendance: 21,436

The 1998 Greek Cup final was the 54th final of the Greek Cup. The match took place on 29 April 1998 at Karaiskakis Stadium. The contesting teams were Panionios and Panathinaikos. It was Panionios' sixth Greek Cup final in their 108 years of existence and Panathinaikos' twenty fourth Greek Cup final and second consecutive in their 90-year history. For the first time in the history of the institution, the president of Greece, Konstantinos Stephanopoulos graced the final with his presence (something that he would repeat in the 4 following finals), also awarding the trophy to the captain of Panionios, Leonidas Vokolos, who shortly after signed with his opponent in the final, Panathinaikos.

== Venue ==
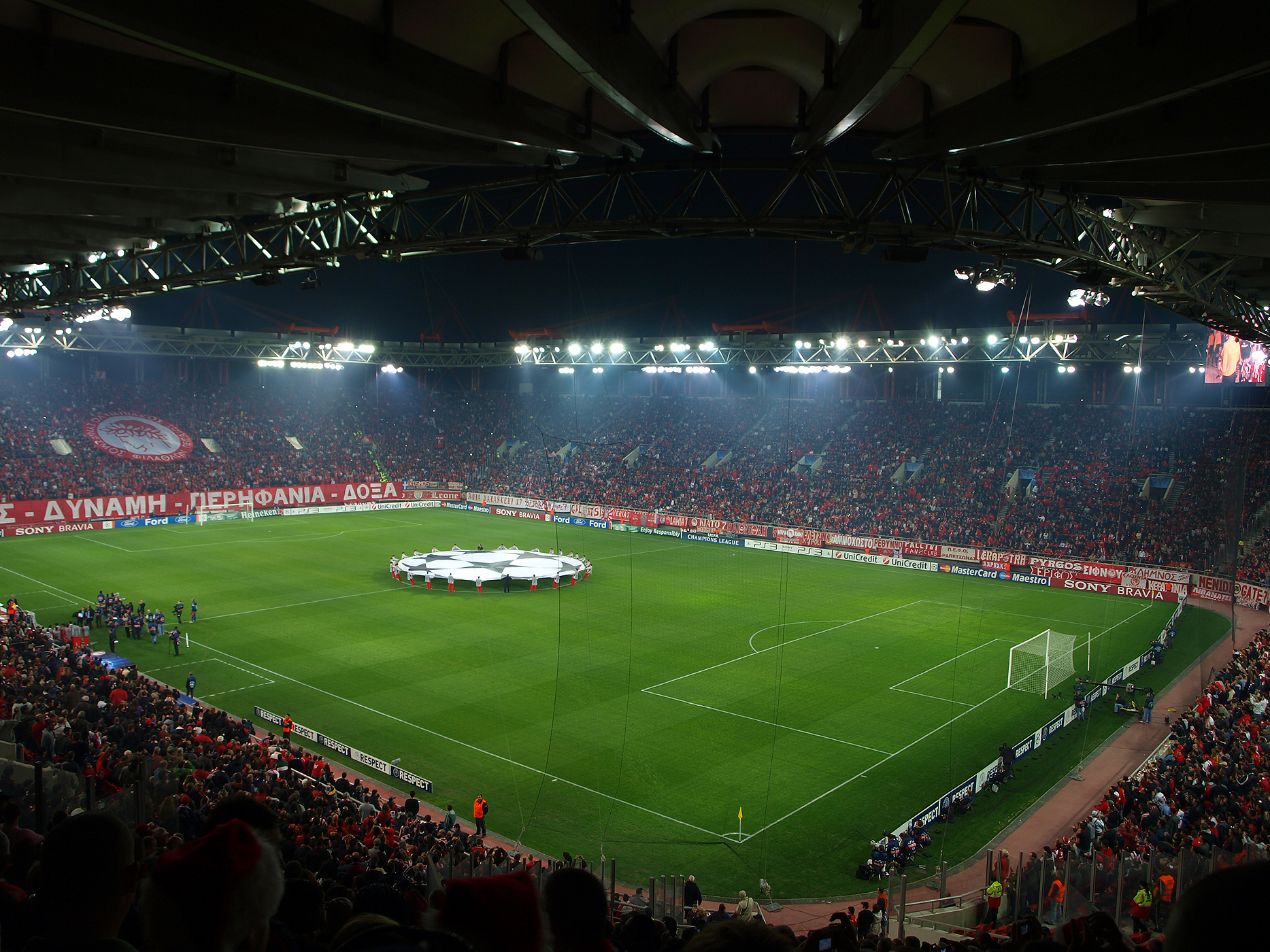
Karaiskakis Stadium.

This was the fourteenth Greek Cup final held at Karaiskakis Stadium, after the 1957, 1958, 1960, 1965, 1969, 1971, 1972, 1973, 1975, 1977, 1978, 1979 and 1997 finals (Karaiskakis also hosted the replay match of the 1960 final between Panathinaikos and Olympiacos and the second leg of the 1992 two-legged final between PAOK and Olympiacos).

Karaiskakis Stadium was built in 1895 and renovated once in 1964. The stadium is used as a venue for Ethnikos Piraeus and was used for Olympiacos and Greece on various occasions. Its current capacity is 42,000 and hosted a UEFA Cup Winners' Cup final in 1971 and the first leg of the Intercontinental Cup final in 1971.

== Background ==
Panionios had reached the Greek Cup final five times, winning one of them. The last time that they had won the Cup was in 1979 (3–1 against AEK Athens). The last time that they had played in a final was in 1989, where they had lost to Panathinaikos by 3–1.

Panathinaikos had reached the Greek Cup final twenty three times, winning fifteen of them. The last time that they had won the Cup was in 1995 (1–0 against AEK Athens). The last time that had played in a final was in 1997, where they had lost to AEK Athens by 5–3 on penalties, which came after a 0–0 draw at the end of the extra time.

The two teams had met each other in a Cup final two times in the 1967 and 1989 finals.

== Route to the final ==
Panionios				Round	Panathinaikos			
Opponent	Agg.	1st leg	2nd leg		Opponent	Agg.	1st leg	2nd leg
Panelefsiniakos	4–3	1–3 (A)	3–0 (H)	Round of 32	Orestis Orestiada	6–0	2–0 (A)	4–0 (H)
Orfeas Alexandroupoli	1–0	0–0 (A)	1–0 (H)	Round of 16	Panserraikos	10–5	4–1 (H)	6–4 (A)
Apollon Kalamarias	6–2	4–2 (H)	2–0 (A)	Quarter-finals	Aris	3–1	1–1 (A)	2–0 (H)
PAOK	2–1	1–0 (H)	1–1 (A)	Semi-finals	Iraklis	4–2	1–2 (A)	3–0 (H)

== Match ==
=== Details ===
29 April 1998

Panionios	1–0	Panathinaikos
Nalitzis 53'	Report

Karaiskakis Stadium, Piraeus
Attendance: 21,436
Referee: Giorgos Borovilos (Arcadia)

Panionios	Panathinaikos

GK	12	(Albania) Foto Strakosha
RB	21	(Greece) Akis Mantzios
CB	5	(Greece) Leonidas Vokolos (c)
CB	24	(Greece) Vasilios Ioannidis	(yellow card) 52' (red card) 72'
LB	20	(Greece) Takis Fyssas
DM	10	(Greece) Antonis Sapountzis	(yellow card) 77'
CM	6	(Greece) Dimitrios Bougas	(yellow card) 13'
CM	8	(Greece) Anastasios Katsabis		(substituted off) 78'
RW	23	(Greece) Giannis Kamitsis	(yellow card) 54' (yellow-red card) 58'
LW	9	(Federal Republic of Yugoslavia) Miodrag Medan		(substituted off) 66'
CF	17	(Greece) Dimitris Nalitzis		(substituted off) 73'
Substitutes:
DF	4	(Norway) Roy Wassberg		(substituted on) 73'
MF	18	(Greece) Kostas Kafalis		(substituted on) 66'
MF	26	(Greece) Theofilos Karasavvidis		(substituted on) 78'
Manager:
(Greece) Christos Emvoliadis

GK	1	(Poland) Józef Wandzik	(yellow card) 54'
RB	2	(Greece) Stratos Apostolakis		(substituted off) 65'
CB	8	(Greece) Giannis Goumas
CB	17	(Greece) Georgios S. Georgiadis	(yellow card) 28' (yellow-red card) 46'
CB	6	(Greece) Thanasis Kolitsidakis
LB	23	(Greece) Theofilaktos Nikolaidis
DM	12	(Norway) Erik Mykland	(yellow card) 42'	(substituted off) 48'
CM	11	(Greece) Giorgos Ch. Georgiadis
CM	18	(Greece) Kostas Konstantinidis
CF	10	(Greece) Alexis Alexoudis		(substituted off) 54'
CF	9	(Poland) Krzysztof Warzycha (c)
Substitutes:
MF	15	(Greece) Angelos Basinas		(substituted on) 48'
FW	13	(Greece) Nikos Liberopoulos		(substituted on) 54'
FW	28	(Poland) Igor Sypniewski		(substituted on) 65'
Manager:
(Greece) Vasilios Daniil

Assistant referees:
Kostas Romanos
Theodoros Kostidis (Thessaloniki)
Fourth official:
Spyros Papadakos (Laconia)

Match rules

- 90 minutes
- 30 minutes of extra time if necessary
- Penalty shootout if scores still level
- Five named substitutes
- Maximum of three substitutions

== See also ==
- 1997–98 Greek Football Cup
