= Anastasios Katsabis =

Greek footballer

Tasos Katsabis
Personal information
- Full name: Anastasios Katsabis
- Date of birth: 30 July 1973 (age 53)
- Place of birth: Athens, Greece
- Height: 1.88 m (6 ft 2 in)
- Position: Defender

Youth career
- –1992: Iraklis Neo Irakleio

Senior career*
Years	Team	Apps	(Gls)
1992–1994	Acharnaikos	34	(7)
1994–1998	Panionios	118	(21)
1998–2002	PAOK	106	(8)
2002–2011	Iraklis	223	(8)
Total		481	(44)

International career
1999–2002	Greece	7	(1)

Managerial career
- 2018: Iraklis (caretaker)
- 2022: Iraklis (caretaker)
- * Club domestic league appearances and goals as of 16 January 2011

Anastasios "Tasos" Katsabis (Greek: Αναστάσιος "Τάσος" Κατσαμπής; born 30 July 1973) is a former Greek football player, who last played for Iraklis in Super League Greece as a centre back. Katsabis started his career as a midfielder but when he was played at PAOK, Angelos Anastasiadis tried him as a centre back because of his height. It was by playing his new position that he gained his first call-up to Greece.

== Club career ==
=== Early career ===
Katsabis started his career in the amateur club of Iraklis Neo Irakleio. In 1992, he got transferred to the semi-professional club Acharnaikos, at that time playing in the Delta Ethniki. Katsabis assisted the club to achieve its promotion to the Gamma Ethniki by scoring 6 goals. In the next season Katsabis was an automatic choice in the starting 11 of Acharnaikos missing just one match out of 34 and scoring 7 goals. His good performances attracted the attention of Alpha Ethniki club Panionios that signed him in the summer of 1994.

=== Panionios ===
Katsabis was titular in Panionios from his first season in the club. In the 1994–95 season he played in 29 matches and scored 2 goals, helping Panionios to avoid relegation. In his second season for the club he featured in 30 matches and scored 3 goals, but Panionios suffered relegation to the Beta Ethniki. Panionios was a firm favorite for promotion in the next season, and Katsabis propelled the club to winning the Betta Ethniki championship by scoring 11 goals in 31 games. The next season was the best for the club for years as the club won the Greek Cup. Katsabis was in the starting 11 of the final. In the league he featured in 28 matches and scored 5 goals. After the Greek Cup success Katsabis along with other teammates (Vokolos, Nalitzis, Fyssas), attracted the attention of the top clubs in Greece. He finally signed for PAOK in the summer transfer window of 1998.

=== PAOK ===
From day one Katsabis was an important first team player for PAOK. In his first season he helped PAOK to finish in the 4th position and win qualification to the UEFA CUP. In total he played in 31 matches and scored 4 goals. In his next season PAOK ended up in the 5th position in the league and Katsabis was once again mainly in the starting 11 (27 matches). The next season brought glory to both PAOK and Katsabis. PAOK won the Greek Cup. Katsabis captained the club in the final, a match held in Nikos Goumas Stadium that found PAOK victorious against Olympiacos by 4–2. In the league Katsabis featured in 23 matches and scored 2 goals. In his last season for the PAOK he played in 25 matches and scored 2 goals helping the club to achieve its 6th consecutive UEFA Cup qualification.

=== Iraklis ===
After his successful spell with PAOK Katsabis signed a contract with Iraklis. He has proved himself indispensable for the club being thought of as the first team choice during his nine years he played for Iraklis. He featured in at least 22 matches each season of a possible 30 totaling over 200 appearances for the club, most were as a starter. He debuted for Iraklis in a 3–0 victory against OFI in the first matchday of the 2002–03 season. His first goal was scored in the 16th minute of a match against Egaleo. It was the second goal of the team in a match that found Iraklis victorious by 2–0. From the 2006–07 season till his retirement he captained Iraklis. In a match against Atromitos, on 10 September 2010, in Peristeri Stadium Katsabis made his 400th appearance in the top tier of Greek football (Alpha Ethniki or Super League). Katsabis retired in a match against former club PAOK. He was lauded by Iraklis and PAOK with a standing ovation by the Iraklis' supporters when he was substituted by Stamou in the 71st minute of the match.

== International career ==
Katsabis made seven appearances for Greece. Katsabis debuted for Greece as a starter in a 1–0 win against Belgium on 5 February 1999 in Neo GSZ Stadium, Larnaca. He scored his sole goal in a friendly match against Salvador on 18 August 1999, in Kavala National Stadium. It was scored in the injury time of the match and was the last goal in a 3–1 win for Greece.

== Career statistics ==
=== International ===
Appearances and goals by national team and year
National team	Year	Apps	Goals
Greece	1999	3	1
Greece	2000	–	
Greece	2001	3	0
Greece	2002	1	0
Total		7	1

Scores and results list Greece's goal tally first, score column indicates score after each Katsabis goal.

List of international goals scored by Anastasios Katsabis
No.	Date	Venue	Opponent	Score	Result	Competition
1	18 August 1999	Anthi Karagianni Stadium, Kavala, Greece	El Salvador	3–1	3–1	Friendly

== Honours ==
=== Club ===
Panionios

- Greek Cup: 1997–98
- Beta Ethniki: 1996—97

PAOK

- Greek Cup: 2000–01

=== Individual ===
- '00 Greek Golden 11 nominee.
