= Marinos Ouzounidis =

Greek footballer (born 1968)

Personal information
- Date of birth: 10 October 1968 (age 58)
- Place of birth: Alexandroupoli, Greece
- Height: 1.85 m (6 ft 1 in)
- Position: Centre-back

Youth career
- 1983–1986: Ethnikos Alexandroupolis

Senior career*
Years	Team	Apps	(Gls)
1986–1987	Apollon Kalamarias	3	(0)
1987–1992	Skoda Xanthi	140	(16)
1992–1997	Panathinaikos	132	(6)
1997–1999	Le Havre	36	(0)
1999–2001	Paniliakos	58	(1)
2001–2003	APOEL	49	(5)
Total		418	(28)

International career
1992–2001	Greece	50	(4)

Managerial career
- 2004–2005: Kappadokes Alexandroupolis
- 2005–2006: Skoda Xanthi (assistant)
- 2006–2008: APOEL
- 2008–2010: AEL
- 2010–2011: Iraklis
- 2011–2012: Skoda Xanthi
- 2012–2013: Skoda Xanthi
- 2013: Platanias
- 2014: Ergotelis
- 2014–2016: Panionios
- 2016–2018: Panathinaikos
- 2018–2019: AEK Athens
- 2020: APOEL
- 2021: Universitatea Craiova
- 2022: Al-Faisaly
- 2023: Al-Faisaly
- 2023–2024: Gol Gohar Sirjan
- 2024–2025: Aris
- * Club domestic league appearances and goals

Marinos Ouzounidis (Greek: Μαρίνος Ουζουνίδης, born 10 October 1968) is a Greek professional football manager and former player.

== Club career ==
Ouzounidis started his professional career playing for the Greek club Skoda Xanthi as a defender from 1987 until 1992.

He then transferred to Panathinaikos where he developed his skills as a libero defender, becoming an essential member of the team that conquered 1995 and 1996 Greek league championships. During this last period, the "Green Shamrocks" reached the semi-finals of the UEFA Champions League.

Good performances eventually resulted in a two-year term transfer to Le Havre AC in France. Ouzounidis returned to the Greek league in 1999, where he played with Paniliakos until 2001.

Ouzounidis finally left for APOEL in Cyprus and after winning the championship and the Super Cup in 2002, he retired there after the 2002–03 season.

== International career ==
Ouzounidis made 49 appearances with Greece. He was their captain under Vassilis Daniil management, playing alongside Nikos Dabizas, before the appearance of Traianos Dellas.

=== International statistics ===
Appearances and goals by national team and year
National team	Year	Apps	Goals
Greece	1992	1	0
Greece	1993	0	0
Greece	1994	0	0
Greece	1995	4	0
Greece	1996	7	1
Greece	1997	7	0
Greece	1998	3	1
Greece	1999	16	0
Greece	2000	10	2
Greece	2001	2	0
Total		50	4

Scores and results list Greece's goal tally first, score column indicates score after each Ouzounidis goal.

List of international goals scored by Marinos Ouzounidis
No.	Date	Venue	Opponent	Score	Result	Competition	Ref.
1	1 September 1996	Kalamata Metropolitan Stadium, Kalamata, Greece	Bosnia and Herzegovina	1–0	3–0	1998 FIFA World Cup qualification	
2	14 October 1998	Athens Olympic Sports Complex, Athens, Greece	Georgia	3–0	3–0	UEFA Euro 2000 qualifying	
3	23 February 2000	Kalamata Metropolitan Stadium, Kalamata, Greece	Austria	3–1	4–1	Friendly	
4	16 August 2000	Espenmoos, St. Gallen, Switzerland	Switzerland	1–1	2–2	Friendly	

== Managerial career ==
When he finished his career as a football player, Ouzounidis managed the team of Kappadokes Alexandoupolis (Greek Fourth Division) as head coach. Later, in the 2005–06 season, he served as an assistant manager in Skoda Xanthi. In May 2006, he became the manager at APOEL. His first season was a very good one finishing first and winning the championship three games before the end of the season. His team also reached the semi-finals of the Cypriot Cup. He resigned from APOEL during the second season, after four draws and three defeats in the first 15 games.

He accepted an offer from AEL on 9 May 2008. In his first season at AEL, he was very successful driving the team into the playoffs and securing a spot in the next season's UEFA Europa League. His record in the first year seemed to confirm AEL chairman Piladakis' idea of using young Greek coaches to lead the team to success. His second year at AEL began badly as the team was knocked out in the first qualifying round of the UEFA Europa League, and on 22 February 2010, the young coach was sacked after the club had found themselves just above the relegation zone. On 9 August, Ouzounidis signed a contract with Iraklis. On 31 January 2011, with the club being only three points above relegation, he resigned from his position as manager. In May 2011, Ouzounidis returned to Skoda Xanthi, where he stayed until September 2012, resigning his post after suffering a 3−0 home loss against PAOK.

In the summer of 2013, Ouzounidis took over management of Super League side, Platanias, but left the club toward the end of 2013. In January 2014, he was appointed manager of fellow Cretan top tier club, Ergotelis, replacing Giannis Petrakis in mid-season. He led the club to a 7th-place finish, the best in club history, accumulating a record 44 points (tied with 6th place local rival OFI). He left the club after the end of the 2013−14 season.

In December 2014, Ouzounidis was appointed as manager of Panionios, with which he had a high rate of success over two domestic campaigns, having recorded 28 wins and 20 draws in 70 games. On 10 August 2016, his contract with the club was terminated unilaterally, mainly because of disloyalty issues raised by the board, due to Ouzounidis simultaneously being in talks with Olympiacos over a potential career move.

On 1 December 2016, Ouzounidis agreed upon a one-and-a-half-year contract with Panathinaikos to take over the vacant managerial role at the club, right after the departure of former manager Andrea Stramaccioni. His first game in charge was a 1–0 victory over PAOK at Leoforos Alexandras Stadium three days later. He was credited with being eager to manage the team despite the chairman Giannis Alafouzos halting the club's funding and imposing radical budget cuts as a means of reducing Panathinaikos' debt. On 7 May 2018, Ouzounidis announced that he would leave the club after the expiration of his contract, expressing his openness to returning to Panathinaikos in the future under different financial and administrative circumstances.

On 25 May 2018, Ouzounidis was appointed as manager of then champions, AEK Athens, on a biennial contract, only hours after the departure of Manolo Jiménez from the club. After the first half of the 2018–19 Super League Greece season, AEK were performing very poorly in the league and expectations were very high after they won the league the season before. They also were the team with the worst performance stats in the 2018–19 UEFA Champions League group stage, being eliminated after losing all six group matches, scoring only two goals, conceding 13 goals, for and against the record of -11 and winning 0 points in their group. Ouzounidis was sacked after a 1–1 home derby draw with title favorites PAOK in February 2019.

After over a year break from the game, in February 2020, he returned for a second stint in the Cypriot First Division as manager of APOEL. Just like his first stint, he failed to help the team enter the group stages either of the UEFA Champions League or the UEFA Europa League and combined with poor form in the domestic league, he was subsequently dismissed as manager on 28 October 2020.

On 23 July 2021, Ouzounidis was fired as Universitatea Craiova head coach following a 0–1 loss against Albanian underdogs Laçi in the 2021–22 UEFA Europa Conference League second qualifying round.

On 27 February 2022, Ouzounidis was appointed as manager of Saudi Arabian club Al-Faisaly.

On 21 January 2023, Ouzounidis was once again appointed as the manager of Al-Faisaly. He was sacked on 16 March 2023.

On 14 June 2023, Ouzounidis signed a contract to manage Iranian club Gol Gohar Sirjan.

== Managerial statistics ==
As of 30 August 2025

Team	From	To	Record				
Team	From	To	G	W	D	L	Win %
(Cyprus) APOEL Nicosia	1 July 2006	7 January 2008	57	37	10	10	64.91
(Greece) AEL	1 July 2008	22 February 2010	64	19	21	24	29.69
(Greece) Iraklis	9 August 2010	31 January 2011	23	6	9	8	26.09
(Greece) Skoda Xanthi	1 July 2011	22 September 2012	36	12	8	16	33.33
(Greece) Skoda Xanthi	3 December 2012	21 April 2013	21	9	6	6	42.86
(Greece) Platanias	28 May 2013	4 November 2013	12	1	6	5	8.33
(Greece) Ergotelis	20 January 2014	14 May 2014	14	7	2	5	50.00
(Greece) Panionios Athens	9 December 2014	8 August 2016	70	28	20	22	40.00
(Greece) Panathinaikos	1 December 2016	7 May 2018	74	36	18	20	48.65
(Greece) AEK Athens	25 May 2018	5 February 2019	34	18	7	9	52.94
(Cyprus) APOEL Nicosia	12 February 2020	28 October 2020	17	6	4	7	35.29
(Romania) Universitatea Craiova	7 February 2021	23 July 2021	26	12	7	7	46.15
(Saudi Arabia) Al-Faisaly	26 February 2022	30 June 2022	14	5	6	3	35.71
(Saudi Arabia) Al-Faisaly	21 January 2023	16 March 2023	8	1	2	5	12.50
(Iran) Gol Gohar Sirjan	14 June 2023	30 June 2024	34	11	12	11	32.35
(Greece) Aris	12 December 2024	9 September 2025	22	10	6	6	45.45
Career totals			521	215	142	164	41.27

== Honours ==
=== As a player ===
Skoda Xanthi

- Beta Ethniki: 1988–89

Panathinaikos

- Alpha Ethniki: 1994–95, 1995–96
- Greek Cup: 1992–93, 1993–94, 1994–95
- Greek Super Cup: 1993, 1994

APOEL Nicosia

- Cypriot First Division: 2001–02
- Cypriot Super Cup: 2002

=== As a manager ===
APOEL Nicosia

- Cypriot First Division: 2006–07

Universitatea Craiova

- Cupa României: 2020–21
- Supercupa României: 2021

Individual

- Super League Greece Manager of the Season: 2015–16
