= Juan José Borrelli =

Argentine footballer and manager

Juan Borrelli
Personal information
- Full name: Juan José Borrelli
- Date of birth: 8 November 1970 (age 55)
- Place of birth: San Isidro, Argentina
- Position: Attacking midfielder

Youth career
- –1990: River Plate

Senior career*
Years	Team	Apps	(Gls)
1990–1991	River Plate	35	(3)
1991–1996	Panathinaikos	86	(26)
1996–1997	Real Oviedo	20	(1)
1997–1998	River Plate	8	(1)
1998–2001	San Lorenzo	25	(0)
2001	Club Atletico Tigre	0	(0)
2001–2002	Deportivo Maldonado	16	(0)
2002	Akratitos	17	(0)

International career
1995–1997	Argentina	7	(0)

Managerial career
- 2004–: River Plate Youth Team
- * Club domestic league appearances and goals

Juan José Borrelli (born 8 November 1970 in San Isidro, Buenos Aires) is an Argentine former footballer, who played as a midfielder, and one of the most known Argentine men's footballers that played in Greece (along with Juan Ramón Rocha).

== Career ==
Borrelli began his career in the late 1980s in River Plate.

In the summer of 1991 the Greek champions, Panathinaikos brought him as the new leader of the team. Although during the first two seasons in the team, Borrelli couldn't show his great potential, mainly because he was homesick, but soon he was transformed into leader in the pitch and helped Panathinaikos win the domestic double 1995.

His contribution was even greater in 1995–96 season when he scored 15 goals in the championship and 4 in Champions League leading his team to win the double and reach the UEFA Champions League semi-finals and the Argentina national team head coach, Daniel Passarella invited him to wear his country's shirt. He was much-beloved by Panathinaikos fans who nicknamed him "Jota Jota".

As a result, his performances attracted scouters from many European teams and in 1997 he was sold to Spanish team Real Oviedo. In the end of the season he returned to Argentina River Plate and San Lorenzo. In 2000/2001 season played for the Argentine side Tigre FC. The following season Borrelli played for a team in Uruguay called Deportivo Maldonado and in the winter returned to Greece for Akratitos.

During the summer, Juan Jose Borrelli announced his retirement.

Two years after his retirement (2004), Borrelli was signed by River Plate as Youth Team head coach.

== Honours ==
River Plate

- Argentine Primera División: 1989–90, 1991 Apertura, 1997 Apertura
- Supercopa Libertadores: 1997

Panathinaikos

- Alpha Ethniki: 1994–95, 1995–96
- Greek Super Cup: 1993, 1994
