= Bougas =

Bougas is a Greek surname. Notable people with the surname include:

- Dimitrios Bougas (born 1971), Greek footballer
- Nick Bougas (born 1955), American documentary film director, illustrator and record producer
