= 1994 Greek Super Cup =

AEK Athens	Panathinaikos
0	3
- Date: 17 August 1994
- Venue: Olympic Stadium, Marousi, Athens
- Referee: Thanasis Zachariadis (Thessaloniki)
- Attendance: 15,457

The 1994 Greek Super Cup was the 7th edition of the Greek Super Cup, an association football match contested by the winners of the previous season's Alpha Ethniki and Greek Cup competitions. The match took place on 17 August 1994 at the Athens Olympic Stadium. The contesting teams were the 1993–94 Alpha Ethniki champions, AEK Athens and the 1993–94 Greek Cup winners, Panathinaikos. Panathinaikos won the match 3–0.

== Venue ==
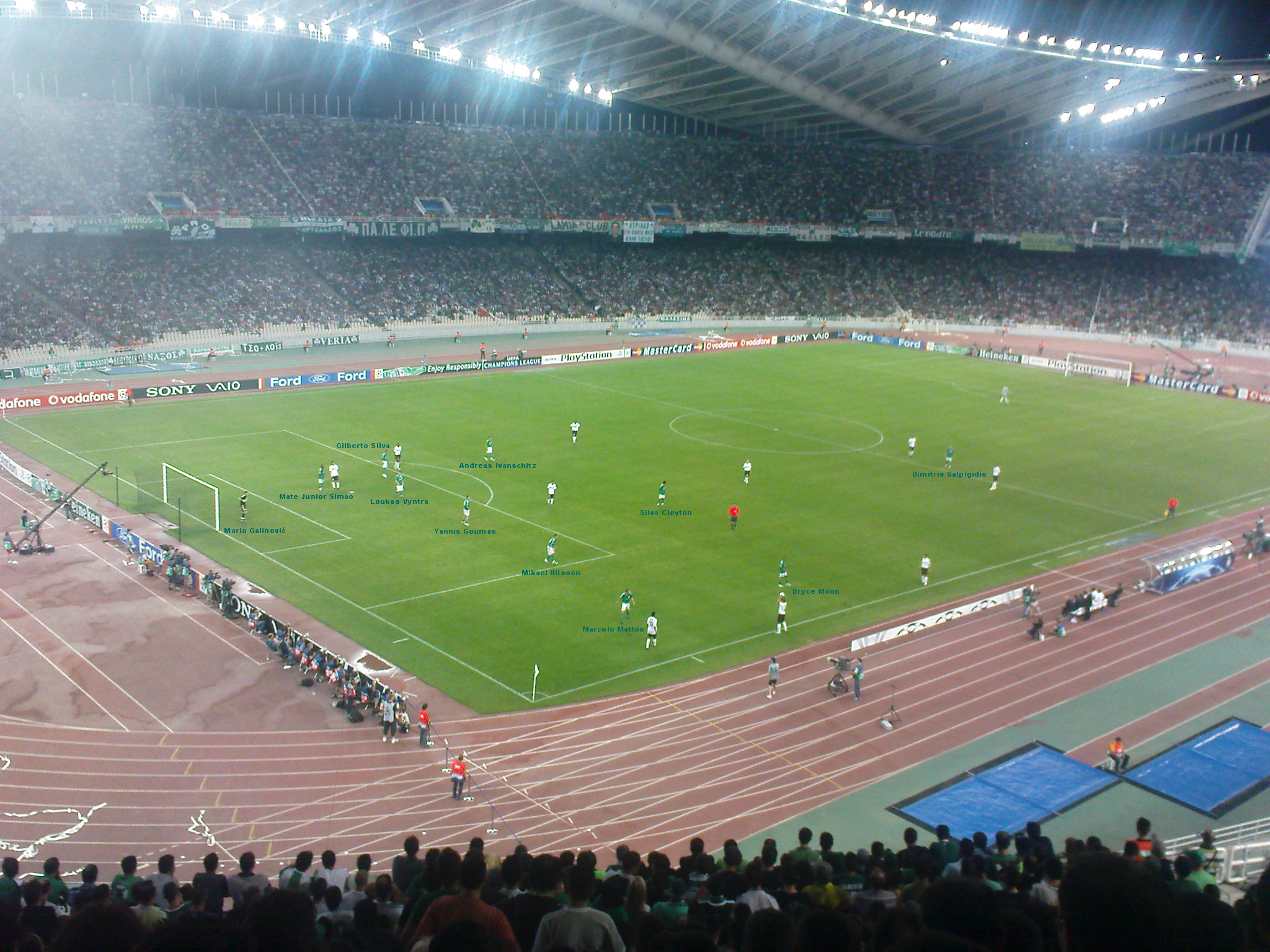
Athens Olympic Stadium.

This was the sixth Greek Super Cup held at the Athens Olympic Stadium, after 1987, 1988, 1989, 1992 and 1993.

The Athens Olympic Stadium was built in 1982. The stadium is used as a venue for Panathinaikos and Greece and was used for Olympiacos and AEK Athens in various occasions. Its current capacity is 80,000 and hosted two European Cup/UEFA Champions League finals in 1983 and 1994, a UEFA Cup Winners' Cup final in 1987 and the 1991 Mediterranean Games.

== Background ==
AEK Athens participated in the Greek Super Cup three times, winning one of them. The last time that they had won the Super Cup was in 1989 (6–5 on penalties, which came after a 1–1 draw at the end of the extra time against Panathinaikos). The last time that they had played in the Super Cup was in 1993, where they lost to Panathinaikos by 1–0.

Panathinaikos participated in the Greek Super Cup three times, winning two of them. The last time that they had played in the Super Cup was in 1993, where they had won AEK Athens by 1–0.

The two teams had met each other in the Super Cup two times in 1989 and 1993.

== Match ==
=== Details ===
17 August 1994
21:00 EEST (UTC+3)

AEK Athens	0–3	Panathinaikos
	Report	Ouzounidis 30'; Apostolakis 76' (pen.); Markos 86'

Olympic Stadium, Marousi
Attendance: 15,457
Referee: Thanasis Zachariadis (Thessaloniki)

AEK Athens	Panathinaikos

GK	1	(Greece) Ilias Atmatsidis
CB	3	(Greece) Nikos Kostenoglou
CB	4	(Greece) Georgios Koutoulas	(yellow card) 76'
CB	6	(Greece) Michalis Vlachos (c)
CM	5	(Bosnia and Herzegovina) Refik Šabanadžović
CM	8	(North Macedonia) Toni Savevski		(substituted off) 58'
RM	2	(Greece) Vasilios Borbokis	(yellow card) 39'	(substituted off) 65'
LM	11	(Greece) Michalis Kasapis	(yellow card) 72'
AM	10	(Greece) Vasilios Tsiartas	(yellow card) 53'
SS	7	(Greece) Christos Kostis
CF	9	(Greece) Vasilis Dimitriadis
Substitutes:
DF	14	(Greece) Charis Kopitsis		(substituted on) 65'
MF	12	(Greece) Stavros Stamatis		(substituted on) 58'
FW		(Greece) Nikos Mirtsekis
Manager:
(Bosnia and Herzegovina) Dušan Bajević

GK	1	(Poland) Józef Wandzik
RB	2	(Greece) Stratos Apostolakis	(yellow card) 79'
CB	4	(Greece) Marinos Ouzounidis
CB	5	(Greece) Giannis Kalitzakis (c)
LB	6	(Greece) Thanasis Kolitsidakis
DM	8	(Australia) Louis Christodoulou
CM	11	(Greece) Dimitris Markos
RM	10	(Greece) Spyros Marangos
LM	3	(Greece) Georgios Ch. Georgiadis
AM	7	(Argentina) Juan José Borrelli		(substituted off) 89'
CF	9	(Poland) Krzysztof Warzycha		(substituted off) 89'
Substitutes:
GK	15	(Greece) Antonios Nikopolidis
MF	16	(Greece) Andreas Lagonikakis		(substituted on) 89'
MF		(Greece) Georgios Savvas Georgiadis
FW	14	(Greece) Georgios Donis		(substituted on) 89'
Manager:
(Argentina) Juan Ramón Rocha

Match rules

- 90 minutes
- 30 minutes of extra time if necessary
- Penalty shootout if scores still level
- Five named substitutes
- Maximum of two substitutions
