= 1995–96 Alpha Ethniki =

60th season of top-tier football league in Greece

Alpha Ethniki
- Season: 1995–96
- Champions: Panathinaikos; 18th Greek title
- Relegated: AEL; Panionios; Ethnikos Piraeus
- Champions League: Panathinaikos
- Cup Winners' Cup: AEK Athens
- UEFA Cup: Olympiacos; Iraklis
- Matches: 306
- Goals: 870 (2.84 per match)
- Top goalscorer: Vasilios Tsiartas (26 goals)

The 1995–96 Alpha Ethniki was the 60th season of the highest football league of Greece. The season began on 26 August 1995 and ended on 29 May 1996. Panathinaikos won their second consecutive and 18th Greek title.

== Teams ==
Promoted from 1994–95 Beta Ethniki	Relegated from 1994–95 Alpha Ethniki
Paniliakos; Panachaiki; Kalamata	Doxa Drama; Levadiakos; Kavala

=== Stadiums and personnel ===
Location of teams in 1995–96 Alpha Ethniki

Team	Manager^{1}	Location	Stadium
AEK Athens	(Bosnia and Herzegovina) Dušan Bajević	Athens (Nea Filadelfeia)	Nikos Goumas Stadium
AEL	(Greece) Andreas Michalopoulos	Larissa	Alcazar Stadium
Apollon Athens	(Greece) Giannis Pathiakakis	Athens (Rizoupoli)	Rizoupoli Stadium
Aris	(Czech Republic) Jozef Jarabinský	Thessaloniki (Charilaou)	Kleanthis Vikelidis Stadium
Athinaikos	(Greece) Babis Tennes	Athens (Vyronas)	Vyronas National Stadium
Edessaikos	(Greece) Angelos Anastasiadis	Edessa	Municipal Stadium of Edessa
Ethnikos Piraeus	(Germany) Timo Zahnleiter	Piraeus (Neo Faliro)	Karaiskakis Stadium
Ionikos	(Ukraine) Oleg Blokhin	Piraeus (Nikaia)	Neapoli Stadium
Iraklis	(Greece) Vasilios Antoniadis	Thessaloniki (Triandria)	Kaftanzoglio Stadium
Kalamata	(Sweden) Bo Petersson	Kalamata	Kalamata Municipal Stadium
OFI	(Netherlands) Eugène Gerards	Heraklion	Theodoros Vardinogiannis Stadium
Olympiacos	(Greece) Takis Persias	Piraeus (Neo Faliro)	Karaiskakis Stadium
Panachaiki	(Greece) Christos Archontidis	Patras	Kostas Davourlis Stadium
Panathinaikos	(Argentina) Juan Ramón Rocha	Athens (Marousi)	Athens Olympic Stadium
Paniliakos	(Greece) Giannis Kyrastas	Pyrgos	Pyrgos Stadium
Panionios	(Greece) Stathis Chaitas	Athens (Nea Smyrni)	Nea Smyrni Stadium
PAOK	(Sweden) Gunder Bengtsson	Thessaloniki (Toumba)	Toumba Stadium
Skoda Xanthi	(Austria) Kurt Jara	Xanthi	Xanthi Ground

- ^{1} On final match day of the season, played on 29 May 1996.

== League table ==
Pos	Team	Pld	W	D	L	GF	GA	GD	Pts	Qualification or relegation
1	Panathinaikos (C)	34	26	5	3	72	22	+50	83	Qualification for Champions League qualifying round
2	AEK Athens	34	25	6	3	87	22	+65	81	Qualification for Cup Winners' Cup first round
3	Olympiacos	34	19	8	7	66	34	+32	65	Qualification for UEFA Cup first round
4	Iraklis	34	17	7	10	51	39	+12	58	Qualification for UEFA Cup qualifying round
5	OFI	34	17	6	11	57	52	+5	57	
6	Skoda Xanthi	34	12	11	11	53	47	+6	47	
7	Aris	34	12	10	12	45	47	−2	46	
8	Ionikos	34	12	10	12	44	50	−6	46	
9	Edessaikos	34	12	8	14	50	59	−9	44 (Note: Head-to-head points (goal difference): Edessaikos 3 (+2), Athinaikos 3 (-2).)	
10	Athinaikos	34	12	8	14	33	47	−14	44	
11	Apollon Athens	34	11	7	16	49	48	+1	40 (Note: Head-to-head points (goal difference): Apollon Athens 3 (0), Paniliakos 3 (0).)	
12	Paniliakos	34	10	10	14	46	51	−5	40	
13	Kalamata	34	9	12	13	41	46	−5	39	
14	PAOK (Note: PAOK were deducted 3 points.)	34	10	11	13	42	46	−4	38	
15	Panachaiki	34	10	6	18	27	47	−20	36	
16	AEL (R)	34	9	7	18	32	64	−32	34	Relegation to Beta Ethniki
17	Panionios (R)	34	8	5	21	35	59	−24	29	Relegation to Beta Ethniki
18	Ethnikos Piraeus (R)	34	5	3	26	40	90	−50	18	Relegation to Beta Ethniki

Source: RSSSF
Rules for classification: 1st points; 2nd head-to-head points; 3rd head-to-head goal difference; 4th decision match.
(C) Champions; (R) Relegated

== Results ==
Home \ Away	AEK	AEL	APA	ARIS	ATH	EDE	ETH	ION	IRA	KAL	OFI	OLY	PNA	PAO	PNL	PGSS	PAOK	XAN
AEK Athens		1–0	1–0	4–0	6–0	3–0	3–1	6–0	3–1	5–1	4–0	1–1	5–1	1–0	3–0	2–0	4–0	2–1
AEL	2–2		3–0	1–1	1–0	1–1	0–1	0–0	1–0	5–0	2–3	3–0	1–0	0–1	1–1	1–0	1–1	1–1
Apollon Athens	0–3	4–0		4–1	0–0	1–1	3–1	4–1	2–1	2–1	0–1	3–4	2–0	2–3	2–1	0–1	0–1	3–1
Aris	2–1	6–0	2–0		1–1	2–0	4–1	2–0	0–0	1–1	2–1	0–0	1–0	1–1	3–1	4–2	0–0	2–2
Athinaikos	0–1	1–0	1–1	0–0		2–1	2–0	1–2	0–1	1–1	3–2	0–1	2–0	1–2	0–0	2–1	2–1	2–1
Edessaikos	2–5	3–1	0–0	1–1	5–2		6–2	0–1	2–0	1–0	3–2	2–5	2–0	1–3	1–3	2–1	3–3	1–1
Ethnikos Piraeus	0–3	0–1	3–2	3–1	3–2	1–1		2–5	1–4	2–3	2–3	0–3	1–2	0–0	2–4	2–0	2–3	1–2
Ionikos	1–4	3–1	1–2	3–1	0–1	3–0	4–1		1–1	2–2	0–0	0–2	1–1	2–1	2–1	2–1	0–0	1–1
Iraklis	1–3	2–1	1–1	3–2	1–2	2–0	4–1	3–1		2–1	5–1	2–1	0–1	1–1	2–0	3–2	2–2	2–0
Kalamata	2–2	5–0	3–0	1–1	1–0	3–1	1–1	0–0	1–0		2–3	3–0	1–0	0–1	1–1	1–0	1–1	1–1
OFI	1–1	0–0	2–1	2–0	0–1	4–1	3–2	3–1	0–0	3–0		2–1	1–0	2–1	2–2	2–2	2–1	3–0
Olympiacos	1–1	3–1	0–3	4–0	3–0	2–0	3–0	1–1	2–1	4–1	3–1		6–1	1–2	3–0	3–1	1–0	1–1
Panachaiki	1–1	1–1	2–1	0–1	2–0	1–0	1–0	1–2	1–0	1–0	0–1	1–1		0–1	0–0	1–0	3–2	1–2
Panathinaikos	1–0	6–1	3–1	3–1	0–0	3–1	3–0	3–0	4–0	4–0	4–0	1–0	1–0		4–1	5–3	2–0	2–0
Paniliakos	0–2	4–2	2–1	2–1	4–1	2–3	2–2	0–0	1–2	1–0	4–2	0–0	1–1	0–1		3–1	1–1	2–2
Panionios	1–2	0–0	2–2	0–2	1–2	1–2	2–1	1–3	0–0	2–1	1–0	1–2	1–0	1–3	1–0		2–1	3–0
PAOK	1–3 (Note: The game was abandoned at the 74th minute due to invasion of PAOK fans. That remained as the final score.)	2–3	2–1	1–0	1–0	0–1	2–0	1–1	1–2	1–1	3–0	0–0	2–1	0–1	1–0	2–0		3–3
Skoda Xanthi	1–1	3–1	1–0	4–0	3–0	1–1	6–1	1–0	0–1	1–0	0–2	1–2	3–1	1–1	1–3	4–0	2–2	

Source: RSSSF
Legend: Blue = home team win; Yellow = draw; Red = away team win.

== Top scorers ==
Rank	Player	Club	Goals
1	(Greece) Vasilios Tsiartas	AEK Athens	26
2	(Poland) Krzysztof Warzycha	Panathinaikos	19
2	(Greece) Vassilis Karapialis	Olympiacos	19
2	(Greece) Christos Kostis	AEK Athens	19
5	(Greece) Nikos Machlas	OFI	18
6	(Greece) Demis Nikolaidis	Apollon Athens	16
6	(Greece) Georgios Nasiopoulos	Edessaikos	16
8	(Georgia (country)) Temur Ketsbaia	AEK Athens	16
8	(Serbia and Montenegro) Ilija Ivić	Olympiacos	16
10	(Greece) Paris Zoumboulis	PAOK	13
10	(Greece) Zisis Vryzas	Skoda Xanthi	13
10	(Greece) Nikos Mirtsekis	Iraklis	13
10	(Bosnia and Herzegovina) Bernard Barnjak	Apollon Athens	13

== Awards ==
=== Annual awards ===
Annual awards were announced on 31 December 1996.

Award	Winner	Club
Greek Player of the Season	(Greece) Georgios Donis (Greece) Vassilis Karapialis (Greece) Vasilios Tsiartas	Panathinaikos; Olympiacos; AEK Athens
Foreign Player of the Season	(Georgia (country)) Temur Ketsbaia	AEK Athens
Young Player of the Season	(Greece) Nikos Liberopoulos	Kalamata
Golden Boot	(Greece) Vasilios Tsiartas	AEK Athens
Manager of the Season	(Bosnia and Herzegovina) Dušan Bajević	AEK Athens

== Attendances ==
Panathinaikos drew the highest average home attendance in the 1995–96 Alpha Ethniki.

#	Team	Average attendance
1	Panathinaikos	11,662
2	Olympiacos	10,295
3	AEK Athens	9,217
4	PAOK	5,903
5	Kalamata	4,686
6	Aris	3,756
7	Panachaiki	3,692
8	Paniliakos	3,571
9	Skoda Xanthi	3,441
10	OFI	3,407
11	Iraklis	3,372
12	Panionios	2,737
13	AEL	2,713
14	Apollon Athens	2,282
15	Ethnikos Piraeus	2,056
16	Ionikos	1,814
17	Athinaikos	1,771
18	Edessaikos	1,484
