= Georgios Donis =

Greek football manager & player (born 1969)

Giorgos Donis
Personal information
- Full name: Georgios Donis
- Date of birth: 22 October 1969 (age 57)
- Place of birth: Frankfurt, West Germany
- Height: 1.80 m (5 ft 11 in)
- Position: Midfielder

Team information
- Current team: Saudi Arabia (head coach)

Youth career
- –1986: Doxa Nikopoli
- 1986–1987: AO Pavlos Melas
- 1987–1988: Panathinaikos

Senior career*
Years	Team	Apps	(Gls)
1988–1996	Panathinaikos	107	(31)
1988–1989	→ Athinaikos (loan)		
1989–1990	→ Panargiakos (loan)		
1990–1991	→ PAS Giannina (loan)	22	(3)
1996–1997	Blackburn Rovers	22	(2)
1997–1999	AEK Athens	30	(2)
1999	Sheffield United	7	(1)
1999–2000	Huddersfield Town	21	(0)
Total		239	(43)

International career
1991–1997	Greece	24	(5)

Managerial career
- 2002–2004: Ilisiakos
- 2004–2008: AEL
- 2008: AEK Athens
- 2009–2012: Atromitos
- 2012–2013: PAOK
- 2013–2015: APOEL
- 2015–2016: Al-Hilal
- 2016–2017: Sharjah
- 2017–2018: APOEL
- 2018–2020: Panathinaikos
- 2020: Maccabi Tel Aviv
- 2021: Al-Wehda
- 2022–2023: Al Fateh
- 2023–2024: Al-Wehda
- 2024–2026: Al-Khaleej
- 2026–: Saudi Arabia
Medal record
Representing Saudi Arabia
Representing Saudi Arabia (as manager)
Arabian Gulf Cup
Winner	2026 Saudi Arabia
- * Club domestic league appearances and goals

Georgios "George" Donis (Greek: Γεώργιος Δώνης; born 22 October 1969) is a Greek football manager and former player who is the head coach of the Saudi Arabia national team. He played as a midfielder, and was the first ever Greek to play in the Premier League.

== Early years ==
Donis was born and raised in Frankfurt, West Germany until he was six years old and the family moved back to their native Greece. His parents had lived in Frankfurt for "many years" and he still has family ties there.

== Club career ==
Donis started his senior career with PAS Giannina in 1990, and after one successful year he moved to Panathinaikos. The supporters of the team named him the Train for his remarkable acceleration.

On 5 June 1996, after helping the Greek club reach the UEFA Champions League semi-finals against Ajax, Donis moved to Blackburn Rovers on a free transfer, making use of the then recent Bosman ruling signing for 1.1 billion drachmas, a record amount for Greek players at the time. He had an erratic season with Blackburn, scoring against Everton and Coventry City.

On 12 December 1997 Donis returned to Greece and signed for AEK Athens. During his spell at the club, he did not manage to achieve his past performances. Furthermore, he came in collision with both managers, Dumitru Dumitriu and Dragoslav Stepanović. On 23 March 1999 following his release from AEK, he returned to England, and signed for Sheffield United until the end of the season. Afterwards, he played for Huddersfield Town, where he ended his career in 2000.

== International career ==
Donis made his debut for Greece on 22 December 1991, in a 1–1 draw against Malta for the UEFA Euro 1992 qualifying round. He appeared in 24 matches and scored five goals during his international career with Greece.

== Managerial career ==
=== AEL ===
After the end of his playing career, he turned to coaching. Starting in 2002, he led Zografou-based Ilisiakos in two consecutive promotions from the fourth to the second Greek football level. He then made the move to AEL where, after one season, he managed to bring the team to the Greek Super League from the second division, and reached eighth place the following year. In 2007, Larissa finished only tenth in the league, but he managed to win the Greek Cup after defeating Panathinaikos 2–1 in the final. In his first taste of European football management, his team AEL defeated his former team Blackburn Rovers to reach the 2007–08 UEFA Cup group stages. He finished a great year in sixth place in the league, missing out on the season play-offs on goal difference.

=== AEK Athens ===
On 25 April 2008, Donis stepped down as manager of AEL and on 14 May he was appointed as head coach of AEK Athens. On 17 November 2008, due to a string of poor performances and early knock out from the UEFA Cup, AEK parted company with him just six months after his appointment.

=== Atromitos ===
In 2009, Donis was appointed by Atromitos and in the 2010–11 season he again reached the Greek Cup Final only to lose 0–3 to his former team AEK Athens. In the next year, Atromitos enjoyed another successful spell under his guidance, reaching the Greek Cup Final for a second consecutive time (losing 1–2 to Olympiacos at extra time), as well as participating at the Greek Super League play-offs.

=== PAOK ===
On 31 May 2012, PAOK appointed Donis as the new manager of the club, on a two-year contract, with immediate effect. On 28 April 2013, after a crucial defeat 0–2 and the elimination in the semi-final of Greek Cup by Asteras Tripolis, he was sacked by chairman Ivan Savvidis.

=== APOEL ===
On 11 October 2013, Donis signed a contract until the end of the 2013–14 season with the reigning Cypriot champions APOEL, replacing Paulo Sérgio who had been fired on 4 October 2013. In his first season at APOEL, Donis achieved to win the double. He won his first title with APOEL on 21 May 2014, when he led his team to a 2–0 victory over Ermis Aradippou in the Cypriot Cup final. Ten days later, Donis won also the Cypriot First Division after APOEL's 1–0 away victory against AEL Limassol in the title deciding match and won his first league title in his managerial career.

Following a successful first season in the club, Donis signed a one-year contract extension with APOEL on 26 June 2014. In August 2014, Donis led APOEL into the group stages of the 2014–15 UEFA Champions League, after eliminating HJK Helsinki (4–2 on aggregate) in the third qualifying round and trashing Aalborg BK 5–1 on aggregate in the play-off round of the competition. APOEL were drawn in Group F alongside Barcelona, Paris Saint-Germain and Ajax. Donis led his team to some great performances in the group stage, but APOEL managed to collect only one point after drawing 1–1 with Ajax at home. In their other five Group F matches, APOEL lost twice to Barcelona (0–4 at home, 0–1 away), lost twice to Paris Saint-Germain (0–1 at home, 0–1 away) and also lost to Ajax 0–4 away.

On 6 January 2015, APOEL and Donis parted company by mutual agreement after a poor run of performances and results, culminating in a 1–1 home draw against the last-placed Ayia Napa.

=== Al-Hilal ===
On 25 February 2015, he was appointed as the new manager of Al-Hilal in Saudi Arabia, signing a contract until the end of the season. He helped Al-Hilal to qualify in the semi-final of the 2015 AFC Champions League. On 6 June, Donis won the first title with Al-Hilal after defeating Al-Nassr in the final of the 2015 King Cup of Champions.

=== Sharjah ===
On 28 July 2016, he was appointed as the new manager of UAE club Sharjah, signing a contract until the summer of 2018.

=== Second spell in APOEL ===
On 28 July 2017, Donis signed a contract until the end of the 2017–18 season with the reigning Cypriot champions APOEL, replacing Mario Been, who had been sacked by APOEL following a 1–0 away European defeat to Viitorul Constanta. On 23 March 2018, APOEL sacked Donis, and replaced him with 40-year-old Portuguese manager Bruno Baltazar. The last straw was APOEL's recent 4–2 away defeat against Apollon Limassol, which saw APOEL fall out of first place in the Cypriot First Division. Expectations had become quite high at APOEL in recent years. The Nicosia giants have won the Cypriot First Division the last five seasons, and seven of the last nine campaigns. With that domestic run now in jeopardy, APOEL made the move to replace Donis with the Portuguese coach.

=== Panathinaikos ===
Donis was appointed on 3 July 2018 as the new manager of his former club as a player, Panathinaikos, signing a three-year contract. On 19 July 2020, after the end of the Super League play-offs, he left the club by mutual consent, mainly as a result of his strenuous relationship with the Panathinaikos board and chairman Giannis Alafouzos.

=== Μaccabi Tel Aviv ===
Donis signed a contract with Maccabi Tel Aviv. He led the team to the Play Offs of the UEFA Champions League, where he was eliminated by Red Bull Salzburg; in the UEFA Europa League, he managed to lead the team to the round of 32. He was dismissed on 22 December 2020, with the team in fifth place in the league.

=== Al-Wehda ===
In March 2021, he became the manager of Saudi club Al-Wehda.

=== Al Fateh ===
On 16 January 2022, Donis was appointed as the manager of Saudi club Al Fateh.

=== Al-Wehda (return) ===
On 11 July 2023, Donis returned to manage Al-Wehda for the second time.

=== Al-Khaleej ===
On 11 July 2024, Donis was appointed as manager of Al-Khaleej.

=== Saudi Arabia ===
On 23 April 2026, Donis was appointed as the head coach of the Saudi Arabia national team ahead of their participation in the 2026 FIFA World Cup, signing a contract until July 2027. In his World Cup debut as a manager, he got a draw against Uruguay.

== Managerial statistics ==
As of match played 17 November 2026

Managerial record by team and tenure
Team	Nat.	From	To	Record					Ref.
Team	Nat.	From	To	G	W	D	L	Win %	Ref.
Ilisiakos	(Greece)	1 July 2002	30 June 2004	47	29	11	7	61.70	
AEL	(Greece)	1 July 2004	24 April 2008	110	39	32	39	35.45	
AEK Athens	(Greece)	14 May 2008	15 November 2008	13	4	7	2	30.77	
Atromitos	(Greece)	1 July 2009	30 May 2012	111	41	37	33	36.94	
PAOK	(Greece)	1 June 2012	29 April 2013	42	26	9	7	61.90	
APOEL	(Cyprus)	11 October 2013	6 January 2015	61	35	14	12	57.38	
Al-Hilal	(Saudi Arabia)	4 March 2015	18 May 2016	66	45	11	10	68.18	
Sharjah	(United Arab Emirates)	28 July 2016	1 January 2017	13	4	2	7	30.77	
APOEL	(Cyprus)	28 July 2017	23 March 2018	41	25	8	8	60.98	
Panathinaikos	(Greece)	3 July 2018	19 July 2020	77	33	22	22	42.86	
Maccabi Tel Aviv	(Israel)	11 August 2020	21 December 2020	25	14	7	4	56.00	
Al Wehda	(Saudi Arabia)	23 March 2021	31 May 2021	6	1	3	2	16.67	
Al Fateh	(Saudi Arabia)	16 January 2022	31 May 2023	46	18	8	20	39.13	
Al-Wehda	(Saudi Arabia)	11 July 2023	30 June 2024	37	11	6	20	29.73	
Al-Khaleej	(Saudi Arabia)	11 July 2024	23 April 2026	63	20	13	30	31.75	
Saudi Arabia	(Saudi Arabia)	23 April 2026	Present	13	6	4	3	46.15	
Career Total				773	351	194	228	45.41	

== Honours ==
=== Player ===
Panathinaikos

- Alpha Ethniki: 1994–95, 1995–96
- Greek Cup: 1992–93, 1993–94, 1994–95
- Greek Super Cup: 1993, 1994

=== Manager ===
Ilisiakos

- Gamma Ethniki: 2003–04
- Delta Ethniki: 2002–03

AEL

- Greek Cup: 2006–07
- Beta Ethniki: 2004–05

APOEL

- Cypriot League: 2013–14
- Cypriot Cup: 2013–14

Al-Hilal

- King Cup of Champions: 2015
- Saudi Super Cup: 2015
- Saudi Crown Prince Cup: 2015–16

Maccabi Tel Aviv

- Toto Cup Al: 2020–21

Saudi Arabia

- Arabian Gulf Cup: 2026

=== Individual ===
- Top Scorer of Greek Cup: 1994–95 (11 goals)
- Best Manager in Greece: 2011–12 (shared)
