= Apostolos Tsoptsis =

Greek footballer and manager

Personal information
- Full name: Apostolos Tsoptsis
- Date of birth: August 29, 1972
- Place of birth: Esovalta, Pella, Greece
- Position: Defender

Team information
- Current team: Edessaikos (manager)

Senior career*
Years	Team	Apps	(Gls)
1990–1992	Local team (Esovalta)		
1992–1997	Edessaikos		
1997–	Ionikos		

Managerial career
- Edessaikos
- * Club domestic league appearances and goals

Apostolos Tsoptsis (Greek: Απόστολος Τσόπτσης, born 9 August 1972) is a Greek association football player and the manager of Edessaikos.

Apostolos Tsoptsis was born on 29 August 1972 at Esovalta, a village near Krya Vrysi, Pella and plays as a defender. He started his football career in 1990 at his hometown's local team. In 1992, he was transferred to Edessaikos, with whom he appeared in the Alpha Ethniki and made his debut in a home Alpha Ethniki match against Athinaikos on 27 September 1992, which ended 4–2. After five years in the Edessa-based team, he moved to Ionikos in 1997.
