= Srđan Čolaković =

Yugoslavian footballer (born 1965)

Personal information
- Date of birth: 21 September 1965 (age 61)
- Place of birth: Yugoslavia
- Position: Forward

Senior career*
Years	Team	Apps	(Gls)
1986–1987	TSV Eching	6	(8)
1987–1988	SpVgg Starnberg	10	(9)
1988–1990	1860 Munich	47	(13)
1990–1991	Jahn Regensburg	28	(3)
1994–1996	Edessaikos	48	(11)
1996–1997	Hapoel Beit She'an	24	(8)
1997	Hapoel Haifa	10	(3)
1998–1999	Hapoel Beit She'an	39	(13)
- * Club domestic league appearances and goals

Srđan Čolaković (born 21 September 1965) is a Yugoslavian former professional footballer who played as a forward.
