= Vasilios Tsiartas =

Greek footballer

Vasilis Tsiartas
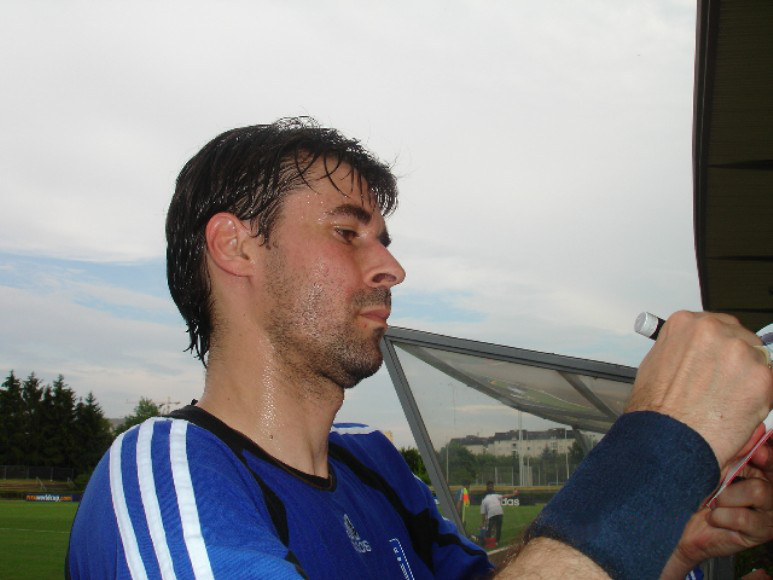
- Tsiartas signing an autograph for a fan in 2005

Personal information
- Full name: Vasilios Tsiartas
- Date of birth: 12 November 1972 (age 53)
- Place of birth: Alexandreia, Greece
- Height: 1.86 m (6 ft 1 in)
- Position: Attacking midfielder

Youth career
- AE Alexandris

Senior career*
| Years | Team | Apps | (Gls) |
| 1989–1992 | Naoussa | 92 | (23) |
| 1992–1996 | AEK Athens | 97 | (37) |
| 1996–2000 | Sevilla | 139 | (44) |
| 2000–2004 | AEK Athens | 98 | (43) |
| 2004–2005 | 1. FC Köln | 4 | (1) |
| 2006–2007 | Ethnikos Piraeus | 3 | (1) |
| Total | | 448 | (149) |

International career
| 1987 | Greece U17 | | |
| 1989–1990 | Greece U19 | | |
| 1991–1994 | Greece U21 | 4 | (1) |
| 1994–2005 | Greece | 70 | (12) |

Managerial career
- 2012: AEK Athens (technical director)
Medal record
Men's football
Representing Greece
UEFA European Championship
| Winner | 2004 |
- * Club domestic league appearances and goals

Vasilios Tsiartas (Greek: Βασίλειος Τσιάρτας; born 12 November 1972) is a Greek former professional footballer who played as an attacking midfielder. He is considered by many to be the greatest modern No.10 in Greek history.

He was an integral part of Greece's Euro 2004 squad, during which in the penultimate match of the tournament he provided the assist for the only silver goal ever scored in an international football match, en-route to Greece's ultimate victory.

== Club career ==
=== Early years ===
Tsiartas began his career at the academy at AE Alexandris and later the team of Naoussa, which also produced players such as Vasilios Lakis and Dimitris Markos. His performance for Naousa, gained the interest of the big teams, notably AEK Athens and Panathinaikos.

=== AEK Athens ===
On 30 November 1992, Tsiartas was eventually transferred to AEK for a fee of 70 million drachmas. He showed samples of his rare class with a characteristic debut on 12 December 1992, in which he scored two goals in a 7–0 victory against Korinthos in Nea Filadelfeia. However, in his first 18 months within the club were a period of adjustment and thus he was between substitutes and starters. At the end of the season AEK won the league, which was followed by another one at the end of the following season, with Tsiartas gaining an ever-increasing role within the team. On 20 April 1994 he had one of the worst moments of his career missing his penalty, in the penalty shoot-out, in the Cup Final against Panathinaikos, in one of the best Greek cup finals of all time, which AEK lost by 4–2. In 1994 he played in the first ever group stage of the Champions League, where he made several very good appearances in domestic competitions. In 1996 he emerged as the league's top scorer making the best season of his career with 26 goals in 33 league matches, achieving and many impressive goals, while he also scored many assists for his teammates, while he also scored 7 goals in the Cup, which AEK won in the end with a record score of 7–1, with Tsiartas scoring a hat-trick. He was voted the best Greek football player of the league alongside Vassilis Karapialis and Georgios Donis by his colleagues in the league.

=== Sevilla ===
On 6 June 1996 his offensive performances resulted in his transfer to Sevilla for a fee of 500 million drachmas (€1.5 million). There, he played a vital role in their promotion to La Liga. He was known in Seville as "El Mago" ("The Magician") for his lethal free kick accuracy and shot power.

=== Return to AEK Athens ===
Tsiartas returned to AEK Athens on 6 July 2000 for a then-record fee of 1.4 billion drachmas (€3.5 million) on another successful four-year spell at AEK. He was now the "maestro" of the build-up of the game, wearing his favorite "10" on the back, while he scored very often. He scored a total of 43 goals for the championship during his second spell in the team, he created a lot of goals for his teammates, while he was also an awesome duo with Demis Nikolaidis. On 27 April 2002 he won yet another Cup with AEK beating Olympiacos by 2–1 at the Olympic Stadium. He made a memorable appearance in the Champions League match in Nea Filadelfeia against Real Madrid in a 3–3 draw, when he scored an amazing goal with a foul and assisted two more goals, one by Christos Maladenis with a corner and one by Demis Nikolaidis also with a foul. In total, Tsiartas had 196 appearances in AEK in the Greek championship and 80 goals, many of which are particularly impressive and today he is in the top 10 of the all time scorers of AEK for the championship. He also had 24 participations with 12 goals in the Cup and 49 games with 10 goals in European games becoming 3rd scorer in the history of the club in European games, behind Demis Nikolaidis and Mimis Papaioannou.

=== Later years ===
In the summer of 2004 Tsiartas was released from AEK and in 30 November he signed for 1. FC Köln, where he won the 2. Bundesliga in 2005. However, he wasn't able to help his club due to an injury and as a result his contract was terminated on 23 June 2005. Afterwards he initially ended his career, but he returned to action on 5 October 2006, by signing at Ethnikos Piraeus. On 14 February 2007 he eventually announced his retirement from professional football.

== International career ==
Having played at under-16 and under-21 level, Tsiartas made his debut for men's team on 27 April 1994 in a game against Saudi Arabia. He managed to score 12 goals in his 70 caps with Greece including the decisive penalty against Northern Ireland which sent Greece to Euro 2004 in a match that he also captained. He also tallied three other crucial assists in the preliminary phase, ultimately leading all Greek players in total goal involvements as they unexpectedly finished atop their qualification group. During the Euro 2004 finals, the now veteran Tsiartas was primarily deployed as Greece’s main super-sub by Otto Rehhagel. He made four total appearances throughout the tournament, and despite never starting still managed to claim two vital assists, the most from any Greek player. The first came in the group stages against Spain as Tsiartas was substituted on during the second half and within minutes had set up Angelos Charisteas for the 1-1 equalizer with a clever ball behind the Spanish defense, essentially securing Greece its first ever knockout stage berth. His second assist of the tournament—and considered as the most iconic moment of his international career—occurred in the final minutes of the semi-final match against the Czech Republic, where Tsiartas came on in extra time and executed the corner kick headed in by Traianos Dellas, resulting in the first and only ever silver goal at a major tournament, directly sending the Greek side to the final.

== Post-playing career ==
After retiring, Tsiartas became a scouting agent. On 22 May 2012 he became the technical director of AEK Athens, but was fired on 26 October due to disagreements with the club management.

Tsiartas was the first Greek player to be featured on the cover of FIFA, appearing on the box art of the debut Greek edition of FIFA 2000.

== Style of play ==
Tsiartas was known for his seemingly lackadaisical playing style, however, his ability was never in question and he was in many ways the epitome of a classic "number 10". He was naturally left-footed, although he was also highly effective with his right foot. He possessed exceptional vision and football intelligence, being particularly renowned for his world-class vertical passing, creative playmaking, and powerful long-range shooting.

His main weakness was his lack of pace, which was largely offset by his outstanding technical skills. A hallmark of his exceptional left foot was his proficiency in set pieces: in addition to scoring numerous goals from free kicks, long-range efforts, and penalties, he also occasionally scored directly from corner kicks. As a result, he was the primary set-piece taker for Greece as well as for the club he played at.

Tsiartas was a key member of the Greece squad that won UEFA Euro 2004, providing two assists against Portugal during the tournament. Notably, throughout his entire career, he was never sent off. Although primarily a playmaker, he was also a capable goalscorer, thanks to his powerful shooting and finishing ability, and was among the top scorers for AEK Athens during his time at the club.

== Career statistics ==
=== International ===
Appearances and goals by national team and year
| National team | Year | Apps | Goals |
|---|---|---|---|
| Greece | 1994 | 6 | 0 |
| Greece | 1995 | 10 | 2 |
| Greece | 1996 | 6 | 1 |
| Greece | 1997 | 2 | 0 |
| Greece | 1998 | 2 | 0 |
| Greece | 1999 | 3 | 2 |
| Greece | 2000 | 7 | 0 |
| Greece | 2001 | 1 | 1 |
| Greece | 2002 | 8 | 1 |
| Greece | 2003 | 9 | 3 |
| Greece | 2004 | 14 | 2 |
| Greece | 2005 | 2 | 0 |
| Total | | 70 | 12 |

Scores and results list Greece's goal tally first, score column indicates score after each Tsiartas goal.

List of international goals scored by Vasilios Tsiartas
| No. | Date | Venue | Opponent | Score | Result | Competition |
|---|---|---|---|---|---|---|
| 1 | 17 May 1995 | Žalgiris Stadium, Vilnius, Lithuania | Lithuania | 1–1 | 1–2 | Friendly |
| 2 | 15 November 1995 | Theodoros Vardinogiannis Stadium, Heraklion, Greece | Faroe Islands | 5–0 | 5–0 | UEFA Euro 1996 qualifying |
| 3 | 24 January 1996 | Municipal Stadium of Chalkida, Chalcis, Greece | Israel | 2–0 | 2–1 | Friendly |
| 4 | 6 October 1999 | Athens Olympic Sports Complex, Athens, Greece | Albania | 1–0 | 2–0 | UEFA Euro 2000 qualifying |
| 5 | 9 October 1999 | Ljudski vrt, Maribor, Slovenia | Slovenia | 1–0 | 3–0 | UEFA Euro 2000 qualifying |
| 6 | 10 November 2001 | Nikos Goumas Stadium, Athens, Greece | Estonia | 3–0 | 4–2 | Friendly |
| 7 | 27 March 2002 | Kostas Davourlis Stadium, Patras, Greece | Belgium | 1–2 | 3–2 | Friendly |
| 8 | 26 March 2003 | UPC-Arena, Graz, Austria | Austria | 1–0 | 2–2 | Friendly |
| 9 | 30 April 2003 | Štadión pod Dubňom, Žilina, Slovakia | Slovakia | 1–0 | 2–2 | Friendly |
| 10 | 11 October 2003 | Leoforos Alexandras Stadium, Athens, Greece | Northern Ireland | 1–0 | 1–0 | UEFA Euro 2004 qualifying |
| 11 | 31 March 2004 | Pankritio Stadium, Heraklion, Greece | Switzerland | 1–0 | 1–0 | Friendly |
| 12 | 9 October 2004 | Olimpiyskiy National Sports Complex, Kyiv, Ukraine | Ukraine | 1–1 | 1–1 | 2006 FIFA World Cup qualification |

== Honours ==
Naoussa

- Beta Ethniki: 1992–93

AEK Athens

- Alpha Ethniki: 1992–93, 1993–94
- Greek Cup: 1995–96, 2001–02

Köln

- 2. Bundesliga: 2004–05

Greece

- UEFA European Championship: 2004

Individual

- Alpha Ethniki top scorer: 1995–96
- Best Greek Player of the Season: 1995–96
