= Vasilios Xanthis =

Greek footballer

Personal information
- Full name: Vasilios Xanthis
- Date of birth: 11 February 1968 (age 58)
- Place of birth: Kastoria, Greece
- Height: 1.85 m (6 ft 1 in)
- Position: Midfielder

Senior career*
Years	Team	Apps	(Gls)
–1988	Kastoria		
1988–1995	Ethnikos Piraeus		
1996	Apollon Athens		
1996–1997	AEL		
1998–2002	Ethnikos Asteras		

Managerial career
- 2014–2016: Kerkyra (youth)
- * Club domestic league appearances and goals

Vasilios Xanthis (Greek: Βασίλειος Ξάνθης; born 11 February 1968) is a retired Greek football midfielder.
