= Thomas Deligiannis =

Greek footballer (born 1962)

Personal information
- Date of birth: 20 January 1962 (age 64)
- Height: 1.86 m (6 ft 1 in)
- Position: Defender

Senior career*
Years	Team	Apps	(Gls)
1983–1987	Pierikos		
1987–1992	Iraklis	98	(5)
1992–1993	Pierikos		
1993–1995	Edessaikos	50	(2)
1995–1996	Ialysos		

International career
1989	Greece	2	(0)
- * Club domestic league appearances and goals

Thomas Deligiannis (Greek: Θωμάς Δεληγιάννης; born 20 January 1962) is a retired Greek footballer who played as a defender.
