= Giannis Kamitsis =

Greek footballer

Personal information
- Full name: Ioannis Kamitsis
- Date of birth: 20 February 1967 (age 59)
- Place of birth: Chania, Greece
- Height: 1.77 m (5 ft 10 in)
- Position: Midfielder

Senior career*
Years	Team	Apps	(Gls)
–1988	Irodotos		
1988–1996	Ethnikos Piraeus		
1996–1999	Panionios		
1999	Thesprotos		
2000	Doxa Vyronas		
2000	Marko		
2001	Kerkyra		
2001–2002	Agios Dimitrios		
- * Club domestic league appearances and goals

Giannis Kamitsis (Greek: Γιάννης Καμίτσης; born 20 February 1967) is a retired Greek football midfielder.

== Honours ==
Panionios

- Greek Cup: 1997–98
