= Municipal Stadium of Edessa =

Multi-purpose stadium in Edessa, Greece

Coordinates: 40.8022°N 22.0521°E

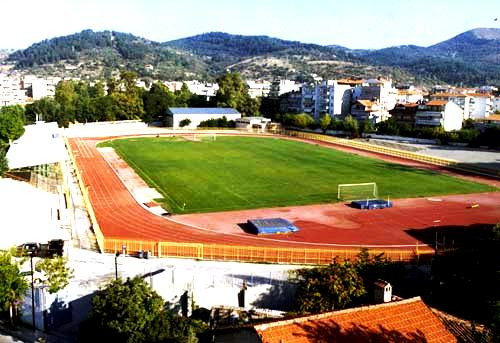
- Interactive map of Municipal Stadium of Edessa
- Location: Edessa, Central Macedonia, Greece
- Capacity: 4,000
- Surface: Grass
- Scoreboard: exists
- Field size: 80x40

Tenant
- Edessaikos

Municipal Stadium of Edessa (Greek: Δημοτικό Στάδιο Έδεσσας) is a multi-choice stadium based in Edessa. The stadium's main stand consists of 4,000 chairs but when Edessaikos F.C. was playing in the Super League Greece the stadium often accommodated about 10,000 fans. In the stadium also participating athletics since has appropriate facilities. Moreover, the stadium contains the old Basketball court of Edessa and the municipal gym and a small grass area in back of the unused rear stand. The stadium is located in the center of the city.
