= Dimitrios Bougas =

Greek footballer (born 1971)

Personal information
- Full name: Dimitrios Bougas
- Date of birth: 13 March 1971 (age 55)
- Place of birth: Kifisia, Greece
- Height: 1.74 m (5 ft 9 in)
- Position: Midfielder

Senior career*
Years	Team	Apps	(Gls)
1992–1997	Ethnikos Piraeus		
1997–1999	Panionios		
1999–2000	Trikala		
2000–2002	Kallithea		
2002–2003	AO Chania		
2003–2006	Agios Dimitrios		
- * Club domestic league appearances and goals

Dimitrios Bougas (Greek: Δημήτριος Μπουγάς; born 13 March 1971) is a retired Greek football midfielder.

== Honours ==
Panionios

- Greek Cup: 1997–98
