= Nikos Mirtsekis =

Greek footballer

Personal information
- Full name: Nikolaos Mirtsekis
- Date of birth: 4 April 1968 (age 58)
- Place of birth: Athens, Greece
- Height: 1.92 m (6 ft 4 in)
- Position: Striker

Youth career
- 1980–1987: Panionios

Senior career*
Years	Team	Apps	(Gls)
1987–1994	Panionios	71	(15)
1988–1989	→ Kalamata (loan)	19	(7)
1994	AEK Athens	2	(0)
1994–1997	Iraklis	62	(31)
1997–1998	Aris		
2009–2011	Olympiacos Argostoli		
Total		154	(53)

International career
1992	Greece	1	(0)
1997	Greece Military		
- * Club domestic league appearances and goals

Nikos Mirtsekis (Greek: Νίκος Μιρτσέκης; born 4 April 1968) is a Greek former professional footballer who played as a striker.

== Club career ==
Mirtsekis started playing football at the age of 12 at the academies of Panionios. He was promoted to the men's team in 1987, but did not compete in any league matches. The following season he was loaned to Kalamata, in the third division, and returned to the club of Nea Smyrni in 1989. He made his debut on December 3 and played for Panionios until 1994.

In July 1994 he transferred to the champions, AEK Athens. He played in the UEFA Champions League match against Ajax on 28 September. However, he failed to establish himself in the squad and on 13 December he was transferred to Iraklis. There he emerged as the team's main goalscorer over the next two seasons, helping the club to 6th and 4th place finishes and a participation in the UEFA Cup. The third season didn't go too well, it was also his conscription period, and he was eventually released from Iraklis. In 1997, he signed for Aris, which had been relegated to the second division and he helped them to return to the first division, before he retired professionally at the end of the season in 1998. He returned in 2009 playing at an amateur level at Olympiacos Argostoli until 2011.

== International career ==
Mirtsekis was called to the Greece in 1992, when the coach, Antonis Georgiadis, made a renewal in the team's roster. He played only in one friendly match on February 12 in a 1–0 win against Romania, held in Ioannina, when he came on as a substitute at the 75th minute.

He was also called to the Military team. where he won the World Military Cup in 1997.

== After football ==
Mirtsekis left Greece and went to the United States, where he played futsal for a few years in clubs of Chicago and worked as a coach in academies for children, such as West Virginia Soccer Club, Barrington Soccer Club, Hinsdale Harricane and Concordia, while for a time he ran the "Niko Mirtsekis Soccer Camps". He also worked in the Illinois State Olympic program and refereed, although since 2009 he has returned to Greece, in Kefalonia, where he worked in the football academies of the local Olympiacos and competed in their first team. He works at the Olympiacos academies in Chicago, Olympiacos Chicago Soccer Schools.

== Personal life ==
Mirtsekis is married and has two boys, who all live in Chicago. His cousin is Theofilos Mirtsekis who played for the U16 AO Peukhs team.

== Honours ==
Greece Military

- World Military Cup: 1997

Aris

- Beta Ethniki: 1997–98
