= 1994–95 Alpha Ethniki =

59th season of top-tier football league in Greece

Alpha Ethniki
- Season: 1994–95
- Champions: Panathinaikos; 17th Greek title
- Relegated: Doxa Drama; Levadiakos; Kavala
- Champions League: Panathinaikos
- UEFA Cup: Olympiacos; Apollon Athens
- Cup Winners' Cup: AEK Athens
- Intertoto Cup: Iraklis; OFI
- Matches: 306
- Goals: 823 (2.69 per match)
- Top goalscorer: Krzysztof Warzycha (29 goals)

The 1994–95 Alpha Ethniki was the 59th season of the highest football league of Greece. The season began on 24 September 1994 and ended on 4 June 1995. Panathinaikos won their 17th Greek title and their first one in four years.

== Teams ==
Promoted from 1993–94 Beta Ethniki	Relegated from 1993–94 Alpha Ethniki
Ionikos; Kavala; Ethnikos Piraeus	Panachaiki; Apollon Kalamarias; Naoussa

=== Stadiums and personnel ===
Location of teams in 1994–95 Alpha Ethniki

Team	Manager^{1}	Location	Stadium
AEK Athens	(Bosnia and Herzegovina) Dušan Bajević	Athens (Nea Filadelfeia)	Nikos Goumas Stadium
AEL	(Greece) Vasilios Daniil	Larissa	Alcazar Stadium
Apollon Athens	(Greece) Giannis Pathiakakis	Athens (Rizoupoli)	Rizoupoli Stadium
Aris	(Greece) Georgios Firos	Thessaloniki (Charilaou)	Kleanthis Vikelidis Stadium
Athinaikos	(Greece) Babis Tennes	Athens (Vyronas)	Vyronas National Stadium
Doxa Drama	(Greece) Giannis Gounaris	Drama	Doxa Drama Stadium
Edessaikos	(Greece) Stavros Diamantopoulos	Edessa	Municipal Stadium of Edessa
Ethnikos Piraeus	(Bosnia and Herzegovina) Nenad Starovlah	Piraeus (Neo Faliro)	Karaiskakis Stadium
Ionikos	(Ukraine) Oleg Blokhin	Piraeus (Nikaia)	Neapoli Stadium
Iraklis	(Federal Republic of Yugoslavia) Dušan Mitošević	Thessaloniki (Triandria)	Kaftanzoglio Stadium
Kavala	(Greece) Christos Terzanidis	Kavala	Kavala National Stadium
Levadiakos	(Turkey) Nikos Kovis	Livadeia	Levadia Municipal Stadium
OFI	(Netherlands) Eugène Gerards	Heraklion	Theodoros Vardinogiannis Stadium
Olympiacos	(Netherlands) Thijs Libregts	Piraeus (Neo Faliro)	Karaiskakis Stadium
Panathinaikos	(Argentina) Juan Ramón Rocha	Athens (Marousi)	Athens Olympic Stadium
Panionios	(Romania) Emerich Jenei	Athens (Nea Smyrni)	Nea Smyrni Stadium
PAOK	(Netherlands) Arie Haan	Thessaloniki (Toumba)	Toumba Stadium
Skoda Xanthi	(Greece) Andreas Michalopoulos	Xanthi	Xanthi Ground

- ^{1} On final match day of the season, played on 4 June 1995.

== League table ==
Pos	Team	Pld	W	D	L	GF	GA	GD	Pts	Qualification or relegation
1	Panathinaikos (C)	34	26	5	3	83	21	+62	83	Qualification for Champions League qualifying round
2	Olympiacos	34	20	7	7	69	31	+38	67	Qualification for UEFA Cup preliminary round
3	PAOK	34	20	5	9	55	29	+26	65	One-year ban from European competitions (Note: On 1 October 1992, PAOK vs Paris Saint-Germain UEFA Cup match was abandoned due to crowd violence and PAOK were punished with a two-year ban from all European competitions by the UEFA disciplinary committee. The sentence was later reduced to one year.)
4	Apollon Athens	34	20	3	11	61	37	+24	63	Qualification for UEFA Cup preliminary round
5	AEK Athens	34	17	11	6	61	33	+28	62	Qualification for Cup Winners' Cup first round (Note: Since Panathinaikos who were the 1994–95 Greek Football Cup winner, were qualified for the 1995–96 UEFA Champions League, the runner-up, AEK Athens took their place in the first round of the 1995–96 UEFA Cup Winners' Cup.)
6	Iraklis	34	18	8	8	55	36	+19	62	Qualification for Intertoto Cup group stage
7	Aris	34	19	5	10	46	34	+12	62	
8	Skoda Xanthi	34	14	8	12	52	55	−3	50	
9	OFI	34	15	4	15	40	38	+2	49	Qualification for Intertoto Cup group stage
10	Edessaikos	34	13	3	18	45	54	−9	42	
11	AEL	34	11	7	16	41	46	−5	40	
12	Athinaikos	34	10	10	14	29	35	−6	40	
13	Ethnikos Piraeus	34	10	9	15	38	48	−10	39	
14	Panionios	34	10	6	18	35	56	−21	36	
15	Ionikos	34	9	7	18	26	48	−22	34	
16	Doxa Drama (R)	34	8	5	21	28	71	−43	29	Relegation to Beta Ethniki
17	Levadiakos (R)	34	5	5	24	23	67	−44	20	Relegation to Beta Ethniki
18	Kavala (R)	34	5	4	25	27	75	−48	19	Relegation to Beta Ethniki

Source: RSSSF
Rules for classification: 1st points; 2nd head-to-head points; 3rd head-to-head goal difference; 4th decision match.
(C) Champions; (R) Relegated

== Results ==
Home \ Away	AEK	AEL	APA	ARIS	ATH	DOX	EDE	ETH	ION	IRA	KAV	LEV	OFI	OLY	PAO	PGSS	PAOK	XAN
AEK Athens		4–0	1–2	3–1	0–0	5–1	5–2	2–1	0–0	4–1	3–0	4–0	2–0	2–2	0–1	2–0	4–3	1–1
AEL	0–0		2–0	0–0	1–1	3–1	0–1	2–1	0–1	1–3	1–0	3–0	1–1	2–1	0–1	1–0	0–2	6–1
Apollon Athens	1–2	2–1		2–0	4–0	5–0	3–1	3–0	2–1	3–0	2–0	3–0	1–2	0–2	2–3	2–1	2–1	3–1
Aris	2–1	1–0	4–1		2–0	3–1	4–0	0–0	1–0	1–1	3–1	2–1	0–1	2–1	2–1	2–0	0–4	0–1
Athinaikos	0–0	0–0	0–1	0–1		4–0	2–1	1–1	1–0	1–1	3–0	2–0	1–0	1–0	0–0	3–1	1–2	2–2
Doxa Drama	0–1	2–1	2–1	1–0	1–0		1–2	2–0	0–0	2–1	4–1	2–2	2–1	0–1	0–1	1–1	0–0	0–1
Edessaikos	2–1	3–2	0–1	2–3	1–0	5–1		2–2	2–0	1–3	5–0	1–0	3–1	1–1	0–2	0–0	2–0	2–0
Ethnikos Piraeus	0–2	3–2	1–0	1–1	1–2	1–0	3–0		1–0	0–1	4–0	1–0	1–1	0–1	1–2	1–1	3–1	0–0
Ionikos	0–0	0–0	0–3	2–0	1–0	2–0	1–0	0–3		1–1	2–1	2–0	1–0	2–2	2–5	0–2	0–2	4–1
Iraklis	3–3	1–0	3–0	3–1	2–0	3–1	4–1	4–0	1–0		2–0	3–1	2–1	0–0	0–0	2–0	1–2	3–2
Kavala	0–0	2–2	0–2	0–2	3–0	1–1	1–0	1–2	1–1	0–1		3–1	0–1	0–2	1–5	1–0	0–1	1–4
Levadiakos	2–1	1–2	1–2	0–2	0–2	4–1	1–2	1–3	1–0	1–2	2–1		1–3	0–2	0–3	1–0	0–1	0–0
OFI	1–2	0–1	1–4	0–1	1–0	5–0	1–0	3–1	3–0	2–1	2–0	0–0		1–0	0–2	2–0	2–1	2–1
Olympiacos	0–1	4–3	3–1	2–1	4–1	2–0	1–0	3–1	6–1	0–0	7–1	4–0	2–1		1–1	2–0	2–0	5–1
Panathinaikos	3–0	2–0	1–0	1–1	1–0	5–0	4–1	3–0	2–0	3–0	3–2	5–0	2–0	1–1		6–1	3–0	3–1
Panionios	2–3	2–1	0–0	0–1	0–0	3–0	3–1	0–0	4–2	2–1	2–5	3–0	1–0	0–3	0–6		3–1	2–0
PAOK	1–1	5–0	1–1	2–0	2–0	1–0	2–1	4–0	2–0	0–0	4–0	0–0	1–0	3–0	2–0	2–0		2–0
Skoda Xanthi	1–1	2–3	2–2	1–2	1–1	5–1	1–0	2–1	1–0	2–1	1–0	2–1	1–1	3–2	3–2	4–1	3–0	

Source: RSSSF
Legend: Blue = home team win; Yellow = draw; Red = away team win.

== Top scorers ==
Rank	Player	Club	Goals
1	(Poland) Krzysztof Warzycha	Panathinaikos	29
2	(Greece) Dimitris Saravakos	AEK Athens	21
3	(Greece) Demis Nikolaidis	Apollon Athens	17
3	(Serbia and Montenegro) Milinko Pantić	Panionios	17
5	(Greece) Alexis Alexandris	Olympiacos	16
6	(Cameroon) David Embé	AEL	15
6	(Greece) Nikos Mirtsekis	Iraklis	15
6	(Bosnia and Herzegovina) Bernard Barnjak	Apollon Athens	15
9	(Greece) Kostas Frantzeskos	OFI	13
10	(Greece) Christos Kostis	AEK Athens	11
10	(Brazil) Marcelo Veridiano	Skoda Xanthi	11

== Awards ==
=== Annual awards ===
Award	Winner	Club
Greek Player of the Season	Georgios Georgiadis; Georgios Skartados; Michalis Kasapis	Panathinaikos; Iraklis; AEK Athens
Foreign Player of the Season	(Poland) Krzysztof Warzycha	Panathinaikos
Young Player of the Season	(Greece) Demis Nikolaidis	Apollon Athens
Golden Boot	(Poland) Krzysztof Warzycha	Panathinaikos
Manager of the Season	(Greece) Giannis Pathiakakis	Apollon Athens

== Attendances ==
Panathinaikos drew the highest average home attendance in the 1994–95 Alpha Ethniki.

#	Team	Average attendance
1	Panathinaikos	11,709
2	Olympiacos	9,989
3	PAOK	9,681
4	AEK Athens	7,445
5	Aris	5,175
6	Skoda Xanthi	3,394
7	Iraklis	3,302
8	Ethnikos Piraeus	2,798
9	OFI	2,712
10	Apollon Athens	2,643
11	AEL	2,406
12	Panionios	2,356
13	Edessaikos	2,069
14	Ionikos	2,058
15	Kavala	1,911
16	Athinaikos	1,723
17	Doxa Drama	1,717
18	Levadiakos	1,217
