= 1996–97 AEK Athens F.C. season =

AEK Athens
1996–97 season
- Chairman: Nikos Stratos (until 31 December); Giorgos Kyriopoulos
- Manager: Petros Ravousis
- Stadium: Nikos Goumas Stadium
- Alpha Ethniki: 2nd
- Greek Cup: Winners
- Greek Super Cup: Winners
- UEFA Cup Winners' Cup: Quarter-finals
- Top goalscorer: League: Christos Kostis (21); All: Christos Kostis (24)
- Highest home attendance: 27,200 (vs Paris Saint Germain) (20 March 1997)
- Lowest home attendance: 329 (vs Lykoi) (27 November 1996)
- Average home league attendance: 7,227
- Biggest win: Athinaikos 0–7 AEK Athens
- Biggest defeat: AEK Athens 0–3 Paris Saint Germain
Home colours	Away colours	Third colours

The 1996–97 season was the 73rd season in the existence of AEK Athens F.C. and the 38th consecutive season in the top flight of Greek football. They competed in the Alpha Ethniki, the Greek Cup, the Greek Super Cup and the UEFA Cup Winners' Cup. The season began on 11 August 1996 and finished on 25 May 1997.

== Kits ==
Supplier: Kappa
Sponsor(s): Geniki Bank

Home	Away	Third

== Overview ==
In the summer of 1996 a very important season begun for AEK Athens, since for the first time after 8 years they were called to proceed without their longest-serving manager, Dušan Bajević. With the move of Bajević to Olympiacos, Michalis Trochanas anointed his assistant and former player of AEK, Petros Ravousis, as his successor at the team's bench. At the same time, the leaguesl's top scorer, Vasilios Tsiartas was sold to Sevilla, while Refik Šabanadžović followed Bajević to Olympiacos, after his contact with AEK was expired. Furthermore, since before the end of the previous season, Dimitris Saravakos had decided to depart from the club and Spyros Ikonomopoulos ended his career after 19 years of service. On the other hand, AEK among the arrivals was the signing of the rising star from Apollon Athens, Demis Nikolaidis, who turned out the offer of Olympiacos, in order to join the team that he supported from childhood.

On 17 August, AEK played in the Super Cup facing Panathinaikos. The yellow-blacks took the lead at the 88th minute with Savevski, but they were equalized in the 90th minute by Alexoudis and the match went to extra time. Michalis Vlachos was sent-off between the 2 goals and AEK played with 10 players for the rest of the match. The score remained in extra time and the match went to the penalty shoot-out. After many penalties were taken, AEK were the eventual winners, with 8–9 and Kopitsis scoring for a second time from the spot.

The team was in a "frantic tempo" from the previous season and played impressive football. For a second season in a row they had the best attack in the league, but again finished in second place. However, both AEK and most of the clubs of the league had intense complaints about the favorable treatment by the referees to Olympiacos throughout the season, since at that time was the beginning of the well-known "shack" of Greek football. By far the most important moment of the season was the return of Bajević to Nea Filadelfeia on 13 January. The stadium was packed again, the match went on as usual and the AEK supporters created an electrified atmosphere of hatred and thirst for revenge against their former favorite manager. Banknotes with the image of Bajević were falling on the manager of Olympiacos, abusive slogans, insulting banners, composed a very strongly electrified atmosphere. Eventually, in a match where the players of AEK "deposited their souls" and the crowd was the "twelfth player", AEK won in the muddy pitch by 2–0. The biggest victories of the season for the championship were the 0–7 against Athinaikos, the 6–1 against Iraklis, Kalamata and Athinaikos once again. Towards the end of the season, Trochanas started causing issues with his announcements, since he went against Ravousis due to the exclusion of the team in Europe and the football department was once again a mess resulting in the latter's departure at the end of the season.

In the UEFA Cup Winners' Cup, AEK were still redeeming their return to the elite of European football with good draws. This time, their opponent were the Slovak Chemlon Humenné. The first match in Athens ended with a 1–0 win and qualification remained open. The rematch in the weather-heavy Humenné started in the worst possible way, as the Slovak took the lead scoring in their first attack after 19 seconds and everything showed to another very tense European game by AEK. However, the capacity difference was so great and as soon as AEK overcame the shock of goal, the qualification case ended with quick procedures as they complete the comeback by the end of the first half. In the second round, AEK came across Olimpija Ljubljana. Ravousis made it clear to the players that this time there was no place for underestimation and indifference and AEK presented themselves extremely serious at the Bežigrad Stadium winning with 0–2 and finishing the qualification. The Slovenians step on the pitch of Nea Filadelfeia and for the first time in their career face a fanatical crowd that pushed AEK into the spectacle and end up losing with the 4–0, despite defending massively. AEK advanced to the third round and participated in the March draw where the major European clubs were present. Paris was painted yellow and black as the draw brought the title holder, Paris Saint-Germain as the opponent of AEK and 5,000 Greeks rushed to the Parc des Princes to support AEK. Michel Platini was commentating on the pitch, who along with 40,000 French people, was watching the two stands of the Greeks who create an amazing atmosphere. AEK presented with defensive orientations and Manolas, perhaps in his last big game with, AEK kept and even loses chances on the counter, since the French are impossible to hold Ketsbaia and Batista. The game ended scoreless, and during the following 15 days, everyone's mind was on the rematch in Athens. Nikos Goumas Stadium was suffocating two hours before the game on 20 March, AEK entered the match offensively and pressed for a goal. In the 21st minute, the referee did not whistle Loko's foul on Vlachos and the Frenchman was unmarked and scored. AEK tried to react, their audience continued to push them relentlessly, but the goal did not come and instead came the second goal for Paris, again with Loko, just before half-time. The qualification was, AEK were doing everything they could to avoid defeat and with Ravousis' desperate attempt to get something good from the match was left very exposed at the back, as a result of which conceded a third goal, again from Patris Loko, ten minutes before the final whistle.

For the Cup, AEK first went through the first round without a match and then very easily eliminated Skoda Xanthi. Then, had an easy task against the ILTEX Lykoi, which he confirmed on the pitch. In the quarter-finals, they played against Paniliakos, beating him in Nikos Goumas Stadium with 3–1, while easily defeating him in Pyrgos Stadium with 0–2. In the semi-finals, AEK faced Olympiacos of Bajević, who returned to Nea Filadelfeia for the second time within a month! The "welcoming" of the Bosnian and Olympiacos was again very heated, AEK again played an incredibly spirited match and led with 2 goals. However, Olympiacos re-entered the qualification game, after a goal by Alexandris in stoppage time. In the rematch in Piraeus, Olympiacos pressed, AEK defended properly and in a nice counterattack in the 47th minute, Ketsbaia made a huge distance with the ball at his feet and finally gave an open goal to Nikolaidis who did not miss the chance to score. The yellow-blacks then kept the score and advance, although again they played with a player short due to the dismissal of Manolas. Thus, AEK advanced to the final of the competition for the fourth season in a row. The final against Panathinaikos took place on 16 April at the Karaiskakis Stadium, in a particularly nervous game which ended without goals both in regular time and in extra time. In the penalty shoot-out, AEK finally got the big victory and the trophy with Atmatsidis as their protagonist, who also scored the last penalty of AEK.

Top scorer of the season for the team was Christos Kostis with 21 goals, while Demis Nikolaidis scored 19 goals. Apart from these two players, Ketsbaia, Manolas, Savevski, Batista, Atmatsidis, Kasapis and Borbokis had also an excellent performance.

== Management team ==
Position	Staff
Manager	(Greece) Petros Ravousis
Assistant manager	(Greece) Apostolos Toskas
Goalkeeping coach	(Greece) Lakis Stergioudas
Fitness coach	(Greece) Georgios Vamvakas
Academy director	(Greece) Andreas Stamatiadis
Academy manager	(Greece) Stelios Serafidis
Academy manager	(Greece) Giorgos Karafeskos
Analyst	(Greece) Nikos Christidis
Scout	(Greece) Aris Tsachouridis
Head of Medical	(Greece) Lakis Nikolaou

== Players ==
=== Squad information ===
NOTE: The players are the ones that have been announced by the AEK Athens' press release. No edits should be made unless a player arrival or exit is announced. Updated 25 May 1997, 23:59 UTC+3.

Player	Nat.	Position(s)	Date of birth (Age)	Signed	Previous club	Transfer fee	Contract until
Goalkeepers
Ilias Atmatsidis (Vice-captain 2)	(Greece)	GK	24 April 1969 (aged 28)	1992	(Greece) Pontioi Veria	₯40,000,000	1999
Vasilis Karagiannis	(Greece)	GK	27 September 1969 (aged 27)	1993	(Greece) Diagoras	₯20,000,000	1998
Dionysis Chiotis	(Greece)	GK	4 June 1977 (aged 20)	1995	(Greece) AEK Athens U20	—	2005
Defenders
Stelios Manolas (Vice-captain)	(Greece)	CB / RB	13 July 1961 (aged 35)	1980	(Greece) AEK Athens U20	—	1997
Anton Doboș	(Romania)	CB	13 October 1965 (aged 31)	1996	(Romania) Steaua București	₯60,000,000	1999
Georgios Koutoulas	(Greece)	CB / LB	9 February 1967 (aged 30)	1987	(Greece) AEK Athens U20	—	1999
Michalis Vlachos (Vice-captain 3)	(Greece)	CB / DM	20 September 1967 (aged 29)	1993	(Greece) Olympiacos	Free	1997
Vaios Karagiannis	(Greece)	LB / CB	25 June 1968 (aged 29)	1990	(Greece) A.O. Karditsa	₯11,000,000	2000
Konstantinos Pavlopoulos	(Greece)	CB	2 July 1968 (aged 28)	1995	(Greece) OFI	Free	1998
Vasilios Borbokis	(Greece)	RB / RM	10 February 1969 (aged 28)	1993	(Greece) Apollon Kalamarias	Free	1997
Charis Kopitsis	(Greece)	RB / RM / LB / LM	5 March 1969 (aged 28)	1992	(Greece) Panionios	Free	1997
Nikos Kostenoglou	(Greece)	CB / RB	3 October 1970 (aged 26)	1994	(Greece) Skoda Xanthi	₯70,000,000	1998
Michalis Kasapis (Captain)	(Greece)	LB / LM	6 August 1971 (aged 25)	1993	(Greece) Levadiakos	₯25,000,000	1998
Midfielders
Toni Savevski	(North Macedonia)	CM / LM / DM	14 July 1963 (aged 33)	1988	(North Macedonia) Vardar	₯34,000,000	1999
Temur Ketsbaia	(Georgia (country))	RM / LM / RW / LW / AM / CM	18 March 1968 (aged 29)	1994	(Cyprus) Anorthosis Famagusta	₯100,000,000	1997
Triantafyllos Macheridis	(Greece)	DM / CB / RB / LB	10 November 1973 (aged 23)	1996	(Greece) Skoda Xanthi	₯100,000,000	2001
Christos Maladenis	(Greece)	CM / RM / LM / AM / DM / RW / LW / SS	23 May 1974 (aged 23)	1995	(Greece) Skoda Xanthi	₯100,000,000	2000
Mattheos Platakis	(Greece)	AM / ST / SS	30 June 1977 (aged 20)	1996	(Greece) Phinikas Polichini	Free	2000
Forwards
Daniel Batista	(Greece) (Cape Verde)	ST / SS / AM	9 September 1964 (aged 32)	1995	(Greece) Olympiacos	Free	1998
Marcelo Veridiano	(Brazil)	ST / SS	30 June 1966 (aged 31)	1996	(Greece) Skoda Xanthi	₯35,000,000	1998
Christos Kostis	(Greece)	SS / ST / AM / RW / LW	15 January 1972 (aged 25)	1994	(Greece) Iraklis	₯350,000,000	1998
Giorgos Kartalis	(Greece)	ST / SS	2 May 1972 (aged 25)	1996	(Greece) Triglia Rafinas	₯4,000,000	2001
Demis Nikolaidis	(Greece) (Germany)	ST / SS	17 September 1973 (aged 23)	1996	(Greece) Apollon Athens	₯330,000,000	1999
Ilias Anastasakos	(Greece)	ST / LW / LM	3 March 1978 (aged 19)	1995	(Greece) A.O. Dafniou	Free	2002
Left during Winter Transfer Window
Vasilis Dimitriadis	(Greece)	ST	1 February 1966 (aged 31)	1991	(Greece) Aris	₯95,000,000	1998

== Transfers ==
=== In ===
==== Summer ====
Pos.	Player	From	Fee	Date	Contract Until	Source
DF	(Romania) Anton Doboș	(Romania) Steaua București	₯60,000,000	11 July 1996	30 June 1999	
MF	(Greece) Triantafyllos Macheridis	(Greece) Skoda Xanthi	₯100,000,000	7 June 1996	30 June 1999	
MF	(Greece) Pantelis Konstantinidis	(Greece) Kavala	Loan return	1 July 1996	30 June 1998	
MF	(Greece) Mattheos Platakis	(Greece) Phinikas Polichini	Free transfer	31 July 1996	30 June 2000	
FW	(Greece) Giorgos Kartalis	(Greece) Triglia Rafinas	₯4,000,000	13 October 1996	30 June 2001	
FW	(Greece) Demis Nikolaidis	(Greece) Apollon Athens	₯330,000,000^{[a]}	20 June 1996	30 June 1999	
FW	(Brazil) Marcelo Veridiano	(Greece) Skoda Xanthi	₯35,000,000	2 July 1996	30 June 1998	

=== Out ===
==== Summer ====
Pos.	Player	To	Fee	Date	Source
GK	(Greece) Spyros Ikonomopoulos	Retired		1 July 1996	
MF	(Bosnia and Herzegovina) Refik Šabanadžović	(Greece) Olympiacos	End of contract	1 July 1996	
MF	(Greece) Pantelis Konstantinidis	(Greece) Apollon Athens	Free transfer	20 June 1996	
MF	(Greece) Vasilios Tsiartas	(Spain) Sevilla	₯500,000,000^{[b]}	6 June 1996	
FW	(Greece) Dimitris Saravakos	Free agent	Contract termination	1 July 1996	

Notes

a. plus Pantelis Konstantinidis.
b. and a friendly game between the two clubs.

==== Winter ====
Pos.	Player	To	Fee	Date	Source
FW	(Greece) Vasilis Dimitriadis	(Greece) Aris	Contract termination	30 January 1997	

=== Loan out ===
==== Summer ====
Pos.	Player	To	Fee	Date	Until	Option to buy	Source
DF	(Greece) Georgios Theodoridis	(Greece) Edessaikos	Free	12 July 1996	30 June 1997	✗	

=== Contract renewals ===
Pos.	Player	Date	Former Exp. Date	New Exp. Date	Source
GK	(Greece) Ilias Atmatsidis	1 July 1996	30 June 1996	30 June 1999	
DF	(Greece) Stelios Manolas	18 July 1996	30 June 1996	30 June 1997	
DF	(Greece) Michalis Vlachos	23 May 1997	30 June 1997	30 June 2000	
MF	(North Macedonia) Toni Savevski	1 July 1996	30 June 1996	30 June 1999	
FW	(Greece) Daniel Batista	23 May 1997	30 June 1997	30 June 1998	

=== Overall transfer activity ===
==== Expenditure ====
Summer: ▼ ₯529,000,000

Winter: ▼ ₯0

Total: ▼ ₯529,000,000

==== Income ====
Summer: ▲ ₯500,000,000

Winter: ▲ ₯0

Total: ▲ ₯500,000,000

==== Net Totals ====
Summer: ▼ ₯29,000,000

Winter: ₯0

Total: ▼ ₯29,000,000

== Pre-season and friendlies ==
19 July 1996 Friendly	Wohlen	1–10	AEK Athens	Wohlen
20:30 EEST (UTC+3)	La Negro 36'	Report	Dimitriadis 9', 79'; Nikolaidis 25'; Ketsbaia 27', 50', 71' (pen.); Borbokis 47', 73'; Maladenis 59', 86'	Stadium: Stadion Niedermatten; Attendance: 100

21 July 1996 Friendly	Kreuzlingen	1–0	AEK Athens	Kreuzlingen
17:30 EEST (UTC+3)	Hermann 66' (pen.)	Report	Borbokis (yellow card); Vlachos (yellow card)	Stadium: Sportplatz Hafenareal

23 July 1996 Friendly	1. FC Kaiserslautern	1–5	AEK Athens	Eschen
20:00 EEST (UTC+3)	Marschall 58'	Report	Kostis 6', 59'; Nikolaidis 19'; Savevski 35'; Kopitsis 66'	Stadium: Sportpark Eschen-Mauren; Attendance: 2000

26 July 1996 Friendly	FSV Zwickau	2–4	AEK Athens	Zwickau
19:30 EEST (UTC+3)	Kunze 22'; Härtel 33', (yellow card)	Report	Maladenis (yellow card); Kostis 1'; Nikolaidis 6', (yellow card); Ketsbaia 66', 85'	Stadium: Stadion Zwickau; Referee: Kurt Reiner Stepan (Germany)

27 July 1996 Friendly	Chemnitzer FC	1–1	AEK Athens	Chemnitz
16:30 EEST (UTC+3)	Wahl 90'	Report	Kostis 27'	Stadium: Stadion an der Gellertstraße

31 July 1996 Friendly	AEK Athens	1–1	Iraklis	Nea Filadelfeia
21:00 EEST (UTC+3)	Marcelo 83'	Report	Sakellaridis 62'	Stadium: Nikos Goumas Stadium; Attendance: 10,802; Referee: Giannis Papapetrou (Athens)

5 August 1996 Friendly	AEK Athens	5–0	Skoda Xanthi	Nea Filadelfeia
21:00 EEST (UTC+3)	Ketsbaia 17', 59', 80'; Marcelo 51'; Nikolaidis 67'	Report		Stadium: Nikos Goumas Stadium; Referee: Giorgos Fasolis (Athens)

7 August 1996 Friendly	AEK Athens	1–0	Apollon Athens	Nea Filadelfeia
18:30 EEST (UTC+3)	Kostis 86' (pen.)	Report		Stadium: Nikos Goumas Stadium; Attendance: 1,117; Referee: Dionysis Stefanopoulos (Piraeus)

19 August 1996 Friendly	AEK Athens	3–2	Sevilla	Nea Filadelfeia
21:00 EEST (UTC+3)	Nikolaidis 8'; Batista 18'; Ketsbaia 75'	Report	Salva 78'; Onésimo 82' (pen.)	Stadium: Nikos Goumas Stadium; Attendance: 9,197; Referee: Sotiris Vorgias (Athens)
Note: Friendly match for the transfer of Vasilios Tsiartas to Sevilla.

26 August 1996 Friendly	AEK Athens	3–1	PAOK	Nea Filadelfeia
21:00 EEST (UTC+3)	Toursounidis 55' (o.g.); Kostis 58'; Nikolaidis 67'	Report	Vryzas 50'	Stadium: Nikos Goumas Stadium; Attendance: 15,000; Referee: Giannis Papapetrou (Athens)

1 September 1996 Friendly	AEK Athens	2–4	OFI	Nea Filadelfeia
19:45 EEST (UTC+3)	Marcelo 6'; Savevski 67' (pen.)	Report	Mitić 9', 15', 90+1'; Moutas 59'	Stadium: Nikos Goumas Stadium; Attendance: 1,807; Referee: Giorgos Fasolis (Athens)

21 September 1996 Friendly	AEK Athens	4–0	Korinthos	Nea Filadelfeia
16:00 EEST (UTC+3)	Nikolaidis 15', 27'; Platakis 55', 58'	Report		Stadium: Nikos Goumas Stadium; Attendance: 500; Referee: Panagiotis Varouchas (Athens)

23 October 1996 Friendly	AEK Athens	8–0	Atromitos	Thrakomakedones
16:00 EEST (UTC+3)	Dimitriadis 4', 17', 22', 30' (pen.), 60'; Tsalis 8'; Kopitsis 25'; Kartalis 28'	Report		Stadium: AEK Athens' Training Complex

18 December 1996 Friendly	AEK Athens	3–1	Apollon Athens	Thrakomakedones
15:00 EEST (UTC+3)	Kopitsis 4'; Adamczyk 59'; Kartalis 68'	Report	Karagiannis 4' (o.g.)	Stadium: AEK Athens' Training Complex; Referee: Nikos Pantazis
Note: The referee was the caretaker of AEK, who ended the game at the 83rd minute.

21 May 1997 Friendly	AEK Athens	5–3	Apollon Athens	Nea Filadelfeia
18:30 EEST (UTC+3)	Kartalis 17'; Platakis 26'; Nikolaidis 60'; Kostis 75', 80'	Report	Dikoumé 30'; Bellaj 51'; Oliveira 68'	Stadium: Nikos Goumas Stadium; Referee: Sotiris Vorgias (Athens)

== Competitions ==
=== Overall record ===
Competition	First match	Last match	Starting round	Final position	Record							
Competition	First match	Last match	Starting round	Final position	Pld	W	D	L	GF	GA	GD	Win %
Alpha Ethniki	8 September 1996	25 May 1997	Matchday 1	2nd	34	22	6	6	75	28	+47	64.71
Greek Cup	3 October 1996	16 April 1997	Round of 32	Winners	9	7	2	0	22	6	+16	77.78
Greek Super Cup	17 August 1996		Final	Winners	1	0	1	0	1	1	+0	0.00
UEFA Cup Winners' Cup	12 September 1996	20 March 1997	First round	Quarter-finals	6	4	1	1	9	4	+5	66.67
Total					50	33	10	7	107	39	+68	66.00

Last updated: 25 May 1997
Source: Competitions

=== Alpha Ethniki ===
==== League table ====
Pos	Team	Pld	W	D	L	GF	GA	GD	Pts	Qualification or relegation
1	Olympiacos (C)	34	26	6	2	72	14	+58	84	Qualification for Champions League second qualifying round
2	AEK Athens	34	22	6	6	75	28	+47	72	Qualification for Cup Winners' Cup first round
3	OFI	34	20	6	8	51	28	+23	66	Qualification for UEFA Cup second qualifying round
4	PAOK	34	19	9	6	53	28	+25	66	Qualification for UEFA Cup second qualifying round
5	Panathinaikos	34	20	4	10	60	25	+35	64	

Source: RSSSF
Rules for classification: 1st points; 2nd head-to-head points; 3rd head-to-head goal difference; 4th decision match.
(C) Champions

==== Results summary ====
Overall								Home						Away					
Pld	W	D	L	GF	GA	GD	Pts	W	D	L	GF	GA	GD	W	D	L	GF	GA	GD
34	22	6	6	75	28	+47	72	15	0	2	47	12	+35	7	6	4	28	16	+12

Source: Competitive matches

==== Results by Matchday ====
Round	1	2	3	4	5	6	7	8	9	10	11	12	13	14	15	16	17	18	19	20	21	22	23	24	25	26	27	28	29	30	31	32	33	34
Ground	A	H	A	H	A	H	A	A	H	A	H	A	H	A	H	H	A	H	A	H	A	H	A	H	H	A	H	A	H	A	H	A	A	H
Result	D	W	L	W	W	W	W	D	W	L	W	L	W	D	W	W	W	W	W	L	D	W	W	W	W	W	W	D	W	D	L	L	W	W
Position	7	6	8	6	5	3	2	4	2	4	2	4	4	4	3	3	3	3	2	3	3	3	3	2	2	2	2	2	2	2	2	2	2	2

Source: Competitive matches
A = Away; H = Home; W = Win; D = Draw; L = Loss; P = Postponed

==== Matches ====
8 September 1996 1	Kavala	1–1	AEK Athens	Kavala
17:30 EEST (UTC+3)	Peglis (yellow card); Sukiasyan (yellow card); Hörtnagl (yellow card); Mitev 27'		Kostenoglou (yellow card); Batista (yellow card); Ketsbaia (yellow card); Doboș (yellow card); Kostis 15'	Stadium: Kavala Municipal Stadium; Attendance: 8,182; Referee: Manolis Papatriantafyllou (Kilkis)

16 September 1996 2	AEK Athens	1–0	Kastoria	Nea Filadelfeia
19:00 EEST (UTC+3)	Manolas (yellow card); Kostis 24'		Tsagopoulos (yellow card) 49'; Paulino (yellow card) 75'	Stadium: Nikos Goumas Stadium; Attendance: 4,459; Referee: Kyros Vassaras (Thessaloniki)

30 September 1996 3	OFI	2–1	AEK Athens	Heraklion
19:00 EEST (UTC+3)	Kiassos (yellow card) 3'; Nioplias 13', 74', (yellow card) 75'; Skentzos (yellow card) 23'; Konstantinidis (yellow card) 76'		Nikolaidis (yellow card) 12'; Kasapis (yellow card) 25'; Borbokis (yellow card) 41'; Batista 57'; Ketsbaia (yellow card) 77'	Stadium: Theodoros Vardinogiannis Stadium; Attendance: 7,559; Referee: Dimitris Begos (Argolida)

13 October 1996 4	AEK Athens	6–1	Iraklis	Nea Filadelfeia
17:45 EEST (UTC+3)	Ketsbaia 17', 84'; Kostenoglou (yellow card) 18'; Savevski 25' (pen.); C. Kostis 44'; Borbokis 49', 53'		Xenidis (yellow card) 14'; Jovanović (yellow card) 22', (goal) 74'; Anatolakis (yellow card) 28'	Stadium: Nikos Goumas Stadium; Attendance: 6,770; Referee: Nikos Iliadis (Piraeus)

21 October 1996 5	Kalamata	0–3	AEK Athens	Kalamata
15:00 EEST (UTC+3)	Tengelidis (yellow card)		Nikolaidis 9', 55', 75'; Marcelo (yellow card) 27'; Savevski (yellow card) 35'; Vaios Karagiannis (yellow card) 62' (yellow-red card) 77'	Stadium: Kalamata Municipal Stadium; Attendance: 4,363; Referee: Michalis Kalathenos (Dodecanese)

27 October 1996 6	AEK Athens	2–1	Apollon Athens	Nea Filadelfeia
15:00 EET (UTC+2)	Borbokis 22', (yellow card); Batista 78'		Konstantinidis (yellow card); Ioannou (yellow card); Erak (yellow card); Dikoumé 48'	Stadium: Nikos Goumas Stadium; Attendance: 7,779; Referee: Platonas Bozatzidis (Thessaloniki)

4 November 1996 7	Athinaikos	0–7	AEK Athens	Vyronas
15:00 EET (UTC+2)	Velis (yellow card) 42'; Tsironis (yellow card) 49'; Spinoulas (yellow card) 66'; Sidiropoulos (yellow card) 70'		Ketsbaia 33', (yellow card) 58'; Kostis (yellow card) 40', (goal) 56', 65'; Nikolaidis 44', 90+1', (yellow card) 75'; Savevski 50' (pen.); Manolas (yellow card) 64'; Kopitsis 87'	Stadium: Vyronas National Stadium; Attendance: 2,254; Referee: Thanasis Zachariadis (Thessaloniki)

17 November 1996 8	Panachaiki	1–1	AEK Athens	Patras
15:00 EET (UTC+2)	Komianos (yellow card); Savvidis (yellow card); Kalla 27'		Borbokis (yellow card); Kasapis (yellow card); Ketsbaia (yellow card); Kostis 14'; Manolas (yellow card) 37' (yellow-red card) 68'	Stadium: Kostas Davourlis Stadium; Attendance: 11,667; Referee: Nikos Angelakis (Thessaloniki)

24 November 1996 9	AEK Athens	2–0	Edessaikos	Nea Filadelfeia
15:00 EET (UTC+2)	Kasapis (yellow card); Doboș (yellow card); Marcelo 15'; Kostenoglou (yellow card) 50'; Kostis 68'			Stadium: Nikos Goumas Stadium; Attendance: 7,006; Referee: Savvas Chatzistavridis (Drama)
Note: In half time, the referee Chatzistavridis was replaced by Nikos Iliadis from Piraeus due to an injury.

1 December 1996 10	Aris	3–2	AEK Athens	Thessaloniki
	Dellas (yellow card) 14', (goal) 57', 81'; Panopoulos 22'; Mitsopoulos (yellow card) 72'		Nikolaidis 2', (yellow card) 59'; Manolas (yellow card) 30'; Kostenoglou (yellow card) 32'; Kostis 36'; Kasapis (yellow card) 90'	Stadium: Aris Stadium; Attendance: 3,154; Referee: Giorgos Bikas (Chalkidiki)

8 December 1996 11	AEK Athens	2–1	Ionikos	Nea Filadelfeia
15:00 EET (UTC+2)	Borbokis (yellow card); Doboș (yellow card); Kopitsis (yellow card); Manolas (yellow card); D. Nikolaidis 10', 71'		Bekos (yellow card); Xanthopoulos (yellow card); Pachatouridis (yellow card); Deligiannis (yellow card) 20'; Frousos 43', (yellow card); A. Nikolaidis (yellow card) 52'	Stadium: Nikos Goumas Stadium; Attendance: 4,439; Referee: Spyros Papadakos (Laconia)

15 December 1996 12	Panathinaikos	2–0	AEK Athens	Marousi
20:00 EET (UTC+2)	Georgiadis (yellow card) 33', (goal) 54'; Kolitsidakis (yellow card) 34'; Warzycha 59'; Kalitzakis (yellow card) 75'		Maladenis (yellow card) 5'; Manolas (yellow card) 40'; Kostenoglou (yellow card) 54'	Stadium: Olympic Stadium; Attendance: 20,313; Referee: Thanasis Vellios (Xanthi)

22 December 1996 13	AEK Athens	3–1	Veria	Nea Filadelfeia
15:00 EET (UTC+2)	Kasapis (yellow card) 39', (goal) 70'; Savevski 40'; Doboș 45'; Vaios Karagiannis (yellow card) 58'		Koulakiotis (yellow card) 34'; Protasov 38'; Stoica (yellow card) 58'; Pakaltsis (yellow card) 86'	Stadium: Nikos Goumas Stadium; Attendance: 5,622; Referee: Giannis Latsios (Larissa)

5 January 1997 14	PAOK	0–0	AEK Athens	Thessaloniki
20:00 EET (UTC+2)	Toursounidis (yellow card) 24'; Tasiopoulos (yellow card) 26'; Sidiropoulos (yellow card) 76'		Vaios Karagiannis (yellow card) 24'; Savevski (yellow card) 53'; Nikolaidis (yellow card) 79'; Macheridis (yellow card) 89'	Stadium: Toumba Stadium; Attendance: 24,056; Referee: Giorgos Borovilos (Arcadia)

13 January 1997 15	AEK Athens	2–0	Olympiacos	Nea Filadelfeia
20:00 EET (UTC+2)	Ketsbaia (yellow card) 13'; Nikolaidis 43'; Kostis 67'; Kasapis (yellow card) 80'; Vlachos (yellow card) 81'		Dabizas (yellow card) 9'; Karapialis (yellow card) 34'; Šabanadžović (yellow card) 55'	Stadium: Nikos Goumas Stadium; Attendance: 23,248; Referee: Savvas Chatzistavridis (Drama)

16 January 1997 16	AEK Athens	2–0	Paniliakos	Nea Filadelfeia
17:30 EET (UTC+2)	Kopitsis 15'; Batista (yellow card) 20'; Nikolaidis 42'; Doboș (yellow card) 54'		Lygnos (yellow card) 20'; Samoladas (yellow card) 32'; Ilić (yellow card) 58'; Lakis (yellow card) 87'	Stadium: Nikos Goumas Stadium; Attendance: 4,041; Referee: Argyris Papachintzios (Thessaloniki)

19 January 1997 17	Skoda Xanthi	1–2	AEK Athens	Xanthi
15:00 EET (UTC+2)	Papadimitriou (yellow card); Patsatzoglou (yellow card); Karageorgiou (yellow card) 44'; Dahlum 46'		Manolas (yellow card); Kechagias 75' (o.g.); Nikolaidis 90+2', (yellow card) 90+3'	Stadium: A.O. Xanthi Stadium; Attendance: 6,359; Referee: Nikos Angelakis (Thessaloniki)

26 January 1997 18	AEK Athens	2–1	Kavala	Nea Filadelfeia
17:00 EET (UTC+2)	Kostis 15'; Batista 37'		Kavakas (yellow card) 14'; Vakirtzis (yellow card) 67'; Hörtnagl 90'	Stadium: Nikos Goumas Stadium; Attendance: 4,261; Referee: Thanasis Zachariadis (Thessaloniki)

3 February 1997 19	Kastoria	0–2	AEK Athens	Kastoria
15:00 EET (UTC+2)			Ketsbaia 16' (pen.); Batista 33'	Stadium: Municipal Stadium of Kastoria; Attendance: 1,965; Referee: Manolis Giannadakis (Lasithi)

9 February 1997 20	AEK Athens	0–1	OFI	Nea Filadelfeia
	Kopitsis (yellow card) 16'		Mitić 5'; Papadopoulos (yellow card) 11'; Stavrakakis (yellow card) 38'	Stadium: Nikos Goumas Stadium; Attendance: 6,732; Referee: Stratos Papoutselis (Lesbos)

16 February 1997 21	Iraklis	2–2	AEK Athens	Thessaloniki
17:00 EET (UTC+2)	Jovanović (yellow card); Gonias 52'; Hatzidis 75'		Vaios Karagiannis (yellow card); Marcelo 16', 58'; Kostenoglou (yellow card) 52' (yellow-red card) 88'	Stadium: Kaftanzoglio Stadium; Attendance: 6,298; Referee: Thanasis Vellios (Xanthi)

23 February 1997 22	AEK Athens	6–1	Kalamata	Nea Filadelfeia
17:00 EET (UTC+2)	Nikolaidis 9', 20', 41', 63', 76'; Marcelo 39'		Dedes (yellow card); Dodoo (yellow card); Kostoulas (yellow card); Larsson 36'	Stadium: Nikos Goumas Stadium; Attendance: 4,794; Referee: Giorgos Bikas (Chalkidiki)

2 March 1997 23	Apollon Athens	1–2	AEK Athens	Rizoupoli
16:00 EET (UTC+2)	Dikoumé (yellow card); Konstantinidis (yellow card); Damigos (yellow card); Alexis (yellow card) 10'; Thomaidis 17'		Kostenoglou (yellow card); Ketsbaia (penalty missed) 10'; Kostis 16'; Nikolaidis 83'	Stadium: Rizoupoli Stadium; Attendance: 8,499; Referee: Stratos Papoutselis (Lesbos)

10 March 1997 24	AEK Athens	6–1	Athinaikos	Nea Filadelfeia
18:00 EET (UTC+2)	Batista 14'; Doboș 25'; Marcelo 71'; Nikolaidis 77'; Kostis 78', 82'		Spinoulas (yellow card); Monos (yellow card); Armilagos 84'	Stadium: Nikos Goumas Stadium; Attendance: 4,460; Referee: Dimitris Begos (Argolida)

16 March 1997 25	AEK Athens	2–0	Panachaiki	Nea Filadelfeia
16:00 EET (UTC+2)	Doboș (yellow card); Vaios Karagiannis (yellow card); Kostis 24'; Batista 35'		Roussos (yellow card)	Stadium: Nikos Goumas Stadium; Attendance: 9,050; Referee: Manolis Giannadakis (Lasithi)

24 March 1997 26	Edessaikos	0–2	AEK Athens	Edessa
16:00 EET (UTC+2)	Georgopoulos (yellow card); Oikonomidis (yellow card)		Borbokis (yellow card); Nikolaidis (yellow card); Marcelo 70'; Savevski 90+2'	Stadium: Municipal Stadium of Edessa; Attendance: 2,845; Referee: Malamas Tevekelis (Thessaloniki)

27 March 1997 27	AEK Athens	5–1	Aris	Nea Filadelfeia
18:00 EET (UTC+2)	Kostis 10', 18', 75'; Borbokis (yellow card) 32', (goal) 40'; Manolas (yellow card) 48'; Ketsbaia 81'		Zachopoulos (yellow card) 29' (yellow-red card) 58'; Dimitriadis 28'	Stadium: Nikos Goumas Stadium; Attendance: 4,489; Referee: Giorgos Borovilos (Arcadia)
Note: When Dimitriadis scored against AEK in the 28th minute, he was applauded of the fans, as if he had scored for his former club.

5 April 1997 28	Ionikos	0–0	AEK Athens	Nikaia
17:00 EEST (UTC+3)	Nikolaidis (yellow card) 22'; Batista (yellow card) 48'; Savevski (penalty missed) 10'		Vavilis (yellow card) 16'; Kljajević (yellow card) 50'; Daraklitsas (yellow card) 52'; Frousos (yellow card) 73'; Andrioli (yellow card) 77'; Giourgousis (red card) 78'	Stadium: Neapoli Stadium; Attendance: 4,058; Referee: Kyros Vassaras (Thessaloniki)

12 April 1997 29	AEK Athens	3–0	Panathinaikos	Nea Filadelfeia
17:15 EEST (UTC+3)	Manolas 41'; Kostis 48'; Batista 72', (yellow card)		Alexopoulos (yellow card) 49'	Stadium: Nikos Goumas Stadium; Attendance: 8,892; Referee: Georgios Psychomanis (Athens)

21 April 1997 30	Veria	1–1	AEK Athens	Veria
17:00 EEST (UTC+3)	Koukoutselas (yellow card); Protasov (yellow card); Pakaltsis (yellow card); Lazarou (yellow card); Koulakiotis (yellow card); Mitropoulos 30'		Atmatsidis (yellow card); Ketsbaia (yellow card); Macheridis (yellow card) 22' (yellow-red card) 32'; Manolas 86'	Stadium: Veria Stadium; Attendance: 2,961; Referee: Argyris Papachintzios (Thessaloniki)

4 May 1997 31	AEK Athens	1–2	PAOK	Nea Filadelfeia
17:00 EEST (UTC+3)	Ketsbaia (yellow card) 1'; Kostis 90'		Chatzizisis (yellow card) 18'; Zouboulis 23', (yellow card) 24'; Vryzas 59'	Stadium: Nikos Goumas Stadium; Attendance: 11,250; Referee: Giorgos Douros (Corinthia)

11 May 1997 32	Olympiacos	2–0	AEK Athens	Piraeus
18:15 EEST (UTC+3)	Gogić (yellow card); Varešanović (yellow card); Alexandris 12'; Đorđević 25' (pen.), (yellow card)		Kasapis (yellow card); Vaios Karagiannis (yellow card); Manolas (yellow card); Atmatsidis (red card) 24'	Stadium: Karaiskakis Stadium; Attendance: 23,032; Referee: Giorgos Borovilos (Arcadia)

18 May 1997 33	Paniliakos	0–2	AEK Athens	Pyrgos
17:00 EEST (UTC+3)	Koloskopis (yellow card) 31' (yellow-red card) 90'		Vlachos 6'; Kostis 32'	Stadium: Pyrgos Stadium; Attendance: 969; Referee: Giorgos Douros (Corinthia)

25 May 1997 34	AEK Athens	2–1	Skoda Xanthi	Nea Filadelfeia
17:30 EEST (UTC+3)	Doboș (yellow card) 4'; Vas. Karagiannis (yellow card) 28'; Nikolaidis 40'; Pavlopoulos (yellow card) 68'; Kostis 86'		Luciano 42'; Sozzani (yellow card) 47'; Chosadas (yellow card) 70'	Stadium: Nikos Goumas Stadium; Attendance: 2,566; Referee: Nikos Iliadis (Piraeus)

=== Greek Cup ===
AEK Athens entered the Greek Cup at the round of 32.

==== Round of 32 ====
3 October 1996 First leg	AEK Athens	5–0	Skoda Xanthi	Nea Filadelfeia
20:00 EEST (UTC+3)	Nikolaidis 41'; Ketsbaia 45+1', 74', 83'; Manolas 52'; Kostenoglou (yellow card) 56'		Kyparissis (yellow card) 58'; Zikos (yellow card) 60'	Stadium: Nikos Goumas Stadium; Attendance: 5,422; Referee: Platonas Bozatzidis (Thessaloniki)

13 November 1996 Second leg	Skoda Xanthi	3–3 (3–8 agg.)	AEK Athens	Xanthi
14:30 EET (UTC+2)	Patsatzoglou (yellow card); Karageorgiou (penalty missed) 18'; Panou 37'; Tsimplidis 46'; Luciano 65', (yellow card)		Kostenoglou (yellow card); Macheridis (yellow card); Marcelo 11', 76'; Dimitriadis 65'	Stadium: A.O. Xanthi Stadium; Attendance: 956; Referee: Giorgos Douros (Corinthia)

==== Round of 16 ====
27 November 1996 First leg	AEK Athens	3–1	ILTEX Lykoi	Nea Filadelfeia
14:45 EET (UTC+2)	Vlachos (yellow card); Ketsbaia (yellow card); Manolas 59'; Dimitriadis 70', (yellow card) 88'; Nikolaidis 73'		Fyntanidis (yellow card); Dotsis 15'	Stadium: Nikos Goumas Stadium; Attendance: 329; Referee: Dimitris Begos (Argolida)

11 December 1996 Second leg	ILTEX Lykoi	0–3 (1–6 agg.)	AEK Athens	Thessaloniki
14:15 EET (UTC+2)			Kasapis 23'; Dimitriadis 52'; Kostis 72'	Stadium: Lykoi Stadium; Referee: Giorgos Bikas (Chalkidiki)

==== Quarter-finals ====
8 January 1997 First leg	AEK Athens	3–1	Paniliakos	Nea Filadelfeia
18:15 EET (UTC+2)	Kostenoglou (yellow card); Kopitsis (yellow card); Batista 23'; Savevski (penalty missed) 42'; Vlachos 63'; Marcelo 66'	Report (page 5)	Koloskopis (yellow card); Samoladas (yellow card); Kyzeridis 15', (yellow card) (yellow-red card) 57'	Stadium: Nikos Goumas Stadium; Attendance: 1,311; Referee: Giorgos Borovilos (Arcadia)

29 January 1997 Second leg	Paniliakos	0–2 (1–5 agg.)	AEK Athens	Pyrgos
15:15 EET (UTC+2)	Tohouroglou (yellow card)	Report	Macheridis (yellow card); Ketsbaia 6', 26' (pen.)	Stadium: Pyrgos Stadium; Referee: Giorgos Douros (Corinthia)

==== Semi-finals ====
12 February 1997 First leg	AEK Athens	2–1	Olympiacos	Nea Filadelfeia
20:30 EET (UTC+2)	Vlachos (yellow card) 26' (red card) 34'; Batista 46', (red card) 87'; Kopitsis 73', (yellow card) 77'	Report (page 6)	Passalis (yellow card) 24'; Eleftheropoulos (yellow card) 30'; Šabanadžović (yellow card) 40' (yellow-red card) 78'; Alexandris 90+2'	Stadium: Nikos Goumas Stadium; Attendance: 24,450; Referee: Spyros Papadakos (Laconia)

26 February 1997 Second leg	Olympiacos	0–1 (1–3 agg.)	AEK Athens	Piraeus
20:30 EET (UTC+2)	Dabizas (yellow card); Gogić (yellow card); Varešanović (yellow card); Anatolakis (yellow card); Giannakopoulos (yellow card)	Report (page 7)	Doboș (yellow card); Macheridis (yellow card); Manolas (yellow card) (yellow-red card) 57'; Atmatsidis (yellow card); Kasapis (yellow card); Nikolaidis 46', (yellow card)	Stadium: Karaiskakis Stadium; Attendance: 25,955; Referee: Manolis Papatriantafyllou (Kilkis)

==== Final ====
16 April 1997 Final	AEK Athens	0–0 (a.e.t.) (5–3 p)	Panathinaikos	Piraeus
20:15 EEST (UTC+3)	Borbokis (yellow card) 10'; Ketsbaia (yellow card) 25'; Kasapis (yellow card) 42'; Kopitsis (yellow card) 110'	Report	Alexopoulos (yellow card) 3'; Markos (yellow card) 24'; Kolitsidakis (yellow card) 35' (yellow-red card) 118'; Goumas (yellow card) 47'; Ouzounidis (yellow card) 63'	Stadium: Karaiskakis Stadium; Attendance: 21,926; Referee: Giorgos Psychomanis (Athens)
	Penalties
	Kopitsis (penalty scored); Borbokis (penalty scored); Nikolaidis (penalty scored); Doboş (penalty scored); Atmatsidis (penalty scored)		(penalty missed) Warzycha; (penalty scored) Konstantinidis; (penalty scored) Georgiadis; (penalty scored) Markos

=== Greek Super Cup ===
17 August 1996 Final	Panathinaikos	1–1 (a.e.t.) (8–9 p)	AEK Athens	Piraeus
20:00 EEST (UTC+3)	Th. Nikolaidis (yellow card) 24'; Alexoudis (yellow card) 36', (goal) 90'; Basinas (yellow card) 43'; Georgiadis (yellow card) 115'	Report	D. Nikolaidis (yellow card) 13'; Kopitsis (yellow card) 81'; Savevski 88'; Vlachos (red card) 90+1'; Manolas (yellow card) 98'	Stadium: Karaiskakis Stadium; Attendance: 21,926; Referee: Giannis Latsios (Larissa)
	Penalties
	Georgiadis (penalty missed); Christodoulou (penalty scored); Liberopoulos (penalty scored); Lagonikakis (penalty scored); Alexoudis (penalty missed); Markos (penalty scored); Nikopolidis (penalty scored); Marangos (penalty scored); Nasiopoulos (penalty scored); Kapouranis (penalty scored); Kolitsidakis (penalty missed)		(penalty missed) Kostis; (penalty missed) Maladenis; (penalty scored) Kopitsis; (penalty scored) Nikolaidis; (penalty scored) Ketsbaia; (penalty scored) Doboș; (penalty scored) Marcelo; (penalty scored) Manolas; (penalty scored) Kasapis; (penalty scored) Atmatsidis; (penalty scored) Kopitsis

=== UEFA Cup Winners' Cup ===
==== First round ====
12 September 1996 First leg	AEK Athens (Greece)	1–0	(Slovakia) Chemlon Humenné	Athens, Greece
21:15 EEST (UTC+3)	Batista (yellow card) 10', (goal) 44'; Ketsbaia (yellow card) 30'; Kopitsis (yellow card) 85'	Report	Sovič (yellow card) 1'	Stadium: Nikos Goumas Stadium; Attendance: 15,141; Referee: Yuri Chebotarev (Russia)

26 September 1996 Second leg	Chemlon Humenné (Slovakia)	1–2 (1–3 agg.)	(Greece) AEK Athens	Humenné, Slovakia
16:30 EEST (UTC+3)	Diňa 1'; Boljat (yellow card) 11'; Sivý (yellow card) 35'; Valkučák (yellow card) 57'; Tomovčík (yellow card) 59'; Lyubarskyi (yellow card) 88'	Report	Ketsbaia (penalty missed) 12'; Kostenoglou (yellow card) 13'; Nikolaidis 19'; Batista 44'; Savevski (yellow card) 65'; Maladenis (yellow card) 73'	Stadium: Chemlon Stadion; Attendance: 14,600; Referee: Mateo Beusan (Croatia)

==== Second round ====
17 October 1996 First leg	Olimpija Ljubljana (Slovenia)	0–2	(Greece) AEK Athens	Ljubljana, Slovenia
19:00 EEST (UTC+3)		Report	Kostis 12'; Ketsbaia 49'; Nikolaidis (yellow card) 61'	Stadium: Bežigrad Stadium; Attendance: 4,000; Referee: Atanas Uzunov (Bulgaria)

31 October 1996 Second leg	AEK Athens (Greece)	4–0 (6–0 agg.)	(Slovenia) Olimpija Ljubljana	Athens, Greece
21:00 EET (UTC+2)	Savevski 5' (pen.); Maladenis (yellow card) 26', (goal) 80'; Batista 34'; Kostis 84'	Report	Kržišnik (yellow card) 5'; Adrović (yellow card) 37'	Stadium: Nikos Goumas Stadium; Attendance: 14,482; Referee: Hermann Albrecht (Germany)

==== Quarter-finals ====
6 March 1997 First leg	Paris Saint-Germain (France)	0–0	(Greece) AEK Athens	Paris, France
21:30 EET (UTC+2)	Kenedy (yellow card) 39'	Report	Borbokis (yellow card) 64'; Kostenoglou (yellow card) 87'	Stadium: Parc des Princes; Attendance: 21,952; Referee: Urs Meier (Switzerland)

20 March 1997 Second leg	AEK Athens (Greece)	0–3 (0–3 agg.)	(France) Paris Saint-Germain	Athens, Greece
21:15 EET (UTC+2)	Manolas (yellow card) 78'	Report	Loko 21', 44', 81'; Leonardo (yellow card) 23'; Lama (yellow card) 35'; Kenedy (yellow card) 65'; Cauet (yellow card) 82'	Stadium: Nikos Goumas Stadium; Attendance: 27,200; Referee: Antonio López Nieto (Spain)

== Statistics ==
=== Squad statistics ===
As of 25 May 1997

No.	Pos	Player	Alpha Ethniki		Greek Cup		Greek Super Cup		Cup Winners' Cup		Total	
No.	Pos	Player	Apps	Goals	Apps	Goals	Apps	Goals	Apps	Goals	Apps	Goals
Goalkeepers
—	GK	(Greece) Ilias Atmatsidis	31	0	8	0	1	0	6	0	46	0
—	GK	(Greece) Vasilis Karagiannis	4	0	2	0	0	0	0	0	6	0
—	GK	(Greece) Dionysis Chiotis	0	0	0	0	0	0	0	0	0	0
Defenders
—	DF	(Greece) Stelios Manolas	23	2	6	2	1	0	6	0	36	4
—	DF	(Romania) Anton Doboș	22	2	7	0	1	0	4	0	34	2
—	DF	(Greece) Georgios Koutoulas	1	0	2	0	0	0	0	0	3	0
—	DF	(Greece) Michalis Vlachos	25	1	7	1	1	0	5	0	38	2
—	DF	(Greece) Vaios Karagiannis	14	0	6	0	0	0	2	0	22	0
—	DF	(Greece) Konstantinos Pavlopoulos	4	0	2	0	0	0	0	0	6	0
—	DF	(Greece) Vasilios Borbokis	27	4	6	0	1	0	6	0	40	4
—	DF	(Greece) Charis Kopitsis	29	2	7	0	1	0	5	0	42	2
—	DF	(Greece) Nikos Kostenoglou	29	0	7	0	0	0	5	0	41	0
—	DF	(Greece) Michalis Kasapis	30	1	6	2	1	0	6	0	43	3
Midfielders
—	MF	(North Macedonia) Toni Savevski	33	4	8	0	1	1	6	1	48	6
—	MF	(Democratic Republic of Georgia) Temur Ketsbaia	30	5	7	5	1	0	6	1	44	11
—	MF	(Greece) Triantafyllos Macheridis	15	0	6	0	0	0	2	0	23	0
—	MF	(Greece) Christos Maladenis	22	0	5	0	1	0	5	1	33	1
—	MF	(Greece) Mattheos Platakis	5	0	0	0	0	0	0	0	5	0
Forwards
—	FW	(Greece) Daniel Batista	21	7	5	2	1	0	5	3	32	12
—	FW	(Brazil) Marcelo Veridiano	27	6	8	3	1	0	3	0	39	9
—	FW	(Greece) Christos Kostis	34	21	8	1	1	0	5	2	48	24
—	FW	(Greece) Giorgos Kartalis	2	0	2	0	0	0	0	0	4	0
—	FW	(Greece) Demis Nikolaidis	31	19	7	3	1	0	6	1	45	23
—	FW	(Greece) Ilias Anastasakos	0	0	0	0	0	0	0	0	0	0
Left during Winter Transfer Window
—	FW	(Greece) Vasilis Dimitriadis	5	0	3	3	0	0	0	0	8	3

=== Goalscorers ===
As of 25 May 1997
The list is sorted by competition order when total goals are equal, then by position and then alphabetically by surname.

Rank	Pos.	Player	Alpha Ethniki	Greek Cup	Greek Super Cup	Cup Winners' Cup	Total
1	FW	(Greece) Christos Kostis	21	1	0	2	24
2	FW	(Greece) Demis Nikolaidis	19	3	0	1	23
3	FW	(Greece) Daniel Batista	7	2	0	3	12
4	MF	(Georgia (country)) Temur Ketsbaia	5	5	0	1	11
5	FW	(Brazil) Marcelo Veridiano	6	3	0	0	9
6	MF	(North Macedonia) Toni Savevski	4	0	1	1	6
7	DF	(Greece) Vasilios Borbokis	4	0	0	0	4
7	DF	(Greece) Stelios Manolas	2	2	0	0	4
9	DF	(Greece) Michalis Kasapis	1	2	0	0	3
9	FW	(Greece) Vasilis Dimitriadis	0	3	0	0	3
11	DF	(Romania) Anton Doboș	2	0	0	0	2
11	DF	(Greece) Charis Kopitsis	2	0	0	0	2
11	DF	(Greece) Michalis Vlachos	1	1	0	0	2
14	MF	(Greece) Christos Maladenis	0	0	0	1	1
Own goals			1	0	0	0	1
Totals			75	22	1	9	107

=== Hat-tricks ===
Numbers in superscript represent the goals that the player scored.

Player	Against	Result	Date	Competition	Source
(Georgia (country)) Temur Ketsbaia	(Greece) Skoda Xanthi	5–0 (H)	3 October 1996	Greek Cup	
(Greece) Demis Nikolaidis	(Greece) Kalamata	3–0 (A)	21 October 1996	Alpha Ethniki	
(Greece) Demis Nikolaidis^{5}	(Greece) Kalamata	6–1 (A)	23 February 1997	Alpha Ethniki	
(Greece) Christos Kostis	(Greece) Aris	5–1 (H)	27 March 1997	Alpha Ethniki	

=== Assists ===
As of 25 May 1997
The list is sorted by competition order when total assists are equal, then by position and then alphabetically by surname.

Rank	Pos.	Player	Alpha Ethniki	Greek Cup	Greek Super Cup	Cup Winners' Cup	Total
1	MF	(North Macedonia) Toni Savevski	9	7	0	4	20
2	DF	(Greece) Vasilios Borbokis	9	0	0	1	10
3	FW	(Greece) Christos Kostis	7	1	0	0	8
3	MF	(Georgia (country)) Temur Ketsbaia	6	2	0	0	8
5	FW	(Greece) Demis Nikolaidis	7	0	0	0	7
6	DF	(Greece) Michalis Kasapis	6	0	0	0	6
7	MF	(Greece) Christos Maladenis	2	2	0	0	4
7	FW	(Brazil) Marcelo Veridiano	2	1	1	0	4
7	DF	(Greece) Charis Kopitsis	1	3	0	0	4
10	FW	(Greece) Daniel Batista	2	0	0	1	3
11	DF	(Greece) Vaios Karagiannis	0	2	0	0	2
12	DF	(Greece) Stelios Manolas	1	0	0	0	1
12	MF	(Greece) Triantafyllos Macheridis	1	0	0	0	1
12	DF	(Romania) Anton Doboș	0	1	0	0	1
Totals			53	19	1	6	79

=== Clean sheets ===
As of 25 May 1997
The list is sorted by competition order when total clean sheets are equal and then alphabetically by surname. Clean sheets in games where both goalkeepers participated are awarded to the goalkeeper who started the game. Goalkeepers with no appearances are not included.

Rank	Player	Alpha Ethniki	Greek Cup	Greek Super Cup	Cup Winners' Cup	Total
1	(Greece) Ilias Atmatsidis	12	5	0	4	21
2	(Greece) Vasilis Karagiannis	1	0	0	0	1
Totals		13	5	0	4	22

=== Disciplinary record ===
As of 25 May 1997

N	P	Nat.	Name	Alpha Ethniki			Greek Cup			Greek Super Cup			Cup Winners' Cup			Total			Notes
N	P	Nat.	Name	Yellow card	Second yellow card	Red card	Yellow card	Second yellow card	Red card	Yellow card	Second yellow card	Red card	Yellow card	Second yellow card	Red card	Yellow card	Second yellow card	Red card	Notes
Goalkeepers
—	GK	(Greece)	Ilias Atmatsidis	1		1	1									2		1	
—	GK	(Greece)	Vasilis Karagiannis	1												1			
—	GK	(Greece)	Dionysis Chiotis																
Defenders
—	DF	(Greece)	Stelios Manolas	9	1		1	1		1			1			12	2		
—	DF	(Romania)	Anton Doboș	6			1									7			
—	DF	(Greece)	Georgios Koutoulas																
—	DF	(Greece)	Michalis Vlachos	1			2		1		1					3	1	1	
—	DF	(Greece)	Vaios Karagiannis	6	1											6	1		
—	DF	(Greece)	Konstantinos Pavlopoulos	1												1			
—	DF	(Greece)	Vasilios Borbokis	6			1						1			8			
—	DF	(Greece)	Charis Kopitsis	2			3			1			1			7			
—	DF	(Greece)	Nikos Kostenoglou	7	1		3						2			12	1		
—	DF	(Greece)	Michalis Kasapis	7			2									9			
Midfielders
—	MF	(North Macedonia)	Toni Savevski	2									1			3			
—	MF	(Democratic Republic of Georgia)	Temur Ketsbaia	7			2						1			10			
—	MF	(Greece)	Triantafyllos Macheridis	2	1		3									5	1		
—	MF	(Greece)	Christos Maladenis	1									2			3			
—	MF	(Greece)	Mattheos Platakis																
Forwards
—	FW	(Greece)	Daniel Batista	4					1				1			5		1	
—	FW	(Brazil)	Marcelo Veridiano	1												1			
—	FW	(Greece)	Christos Kostis	1												1			
—	FW	(Greece)	Giorgos Kartalis																
—	FW	(Greece)	Demis Nikolaidis	7			1			1			1			10			
—	FW	(Greece)	Ilias Anastasakos																
Left during Winter Transfer window
—	FW	(Greece)	Vasilis Dimitriadis				1									1			

=== Starting 11 ===
This section presents the most frequently used formation along with the players with the most starts across all competitions.

N.	Formation	Matchday(s)
40	4–3–3	1–3, 5–34
1	3–5–2	4
1	4–4–2 (D)

Nat.	Player	Pos.
(Greece)	Ilias Atmatsidis	GK
(Greece)	Stelios Manolas	RCB
(Greece)	Nikos Kostenoglou	LCB
(Greece)	Vasilios Borbokis	RB
(Greece)	Michalis Kasapis (C)	LB
(Greece)	Michalis Vlachos	DM
(Greece)	Christos Maladenis	RCM
(North Macedonia)	Toni Savevski	LCM
(Georgia (country))	Temur Ketsbaia	RW
(Greece)	Christos Kostis	LW
(Greece)	Demis Nikolaidis	CF

Last updated: 1997-05-25

== Awards ==
Player	Pos.	Award	Source
(Greece) Christos Kostis	FW	Greek Player of the Season (shared)	
(Greece) Demis Nikolaidis	FW	Greek Player of the Season (shared)	
