= 1997 Greek Football Cup final =

1997 Greek Cup final
- Event: 1996–97 Greek Football Cup
AEK Athens	Panathinaikos
0	0
- After extra time AEK Athens won 5–3 on penalties
- Date: 16 April 1997
- Venue: Karaiskakis Stadium, Piraeus
- Referee: Giorgos Psychomanis (Athens)
- Attendance: 21,926

The 1997 Greek Cup final was the 53rd final of the Greek Cup. The match took place on 16 April 1997 at Karaiskakis Stadium. The contesting teams were AEK Athens and Panathinaikos. It was AEK Athens' fifteenth Greek Cup final and fourth consecutive in their 73 years of existence and Panathinaikos' twenty third Greek Cup final in their 89-year history. For third time in the 4 last years AEK Athens and Panathinaikos were pondered over in the final. The loss of Cup for Panathinaikos, in combination with their 5th place finish in the championship, resulted in club not qualifying for any European competition for the first time in the last 25 years.

== Venue ==
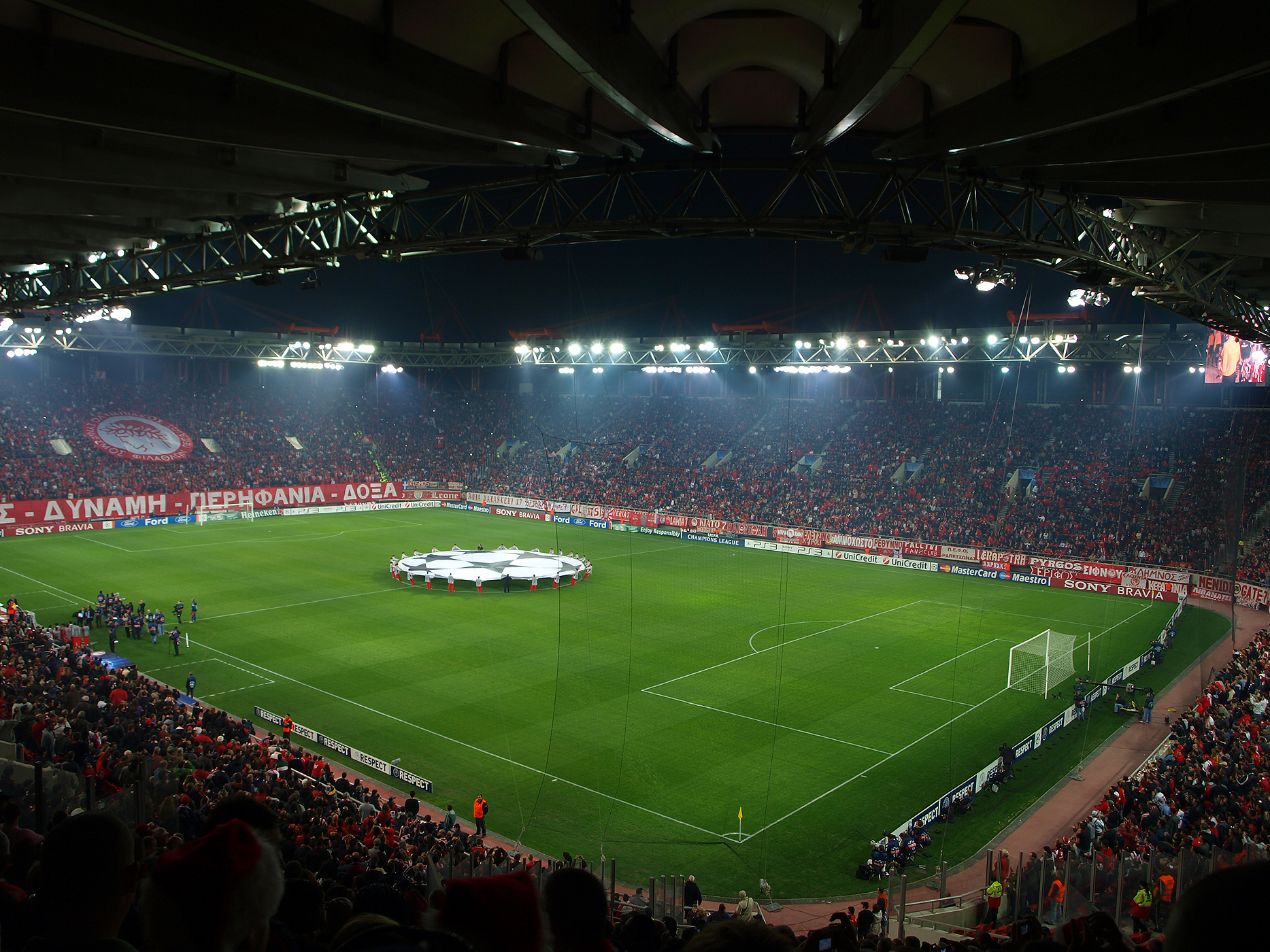
Karaiskakis Stadium.

This was the twelfth Greek Cup final held at Karaiskakis Stadium, after the 1957, 1958, 1965, 1969, 1971, 1972, 1973, 1975, 1977, 1978 and 1979 finals (Karaiskakis also hosted the replay match of the 1960 final between Panathinaikos and Olympiacos and the second leg of the 1992 two-legged final between PAOK and Olympiacos).

Karaiskakis Stadium was built in 1895 and renovated once in 1964. The stadium is used as a venue for Ethnikos Piraeus and was used for Olympiacos and Greece on various occasions. Its current capacity is 42,000 and hosted a UEFA Cup Winners' Cup final in 1971 and the first leg of the Intercontinental Cup final in 1971.

== Background ==
AEK Athens had reached the Greek Cup final fourteen times, winning nine of them. The last time that played in a final was in 1996, where they had won against Apollon Athens by 7–1.

Panathinaikos had reached the Greek Cup final twenty two times, winning fifteen of them. The last time that they had played the Cup was in 1995, where they had won against AEK Athens by 1–0 after extra time.

The two teams had met each other in a Cup final four times in the 1948, 1949, 1994 and 1995 finals.

== Route to the final ==
AEK Athens				Round	Panathinaikos			
Opponent	Agg.	1st leg	2nd leg		Opponent	Agg.	1st leg	2nd leg
Skoda Xanthi	8–3	5–0 (H)	3–3 (A)	Round of 32	Athinaikos	6–0	3–0 (H)	3–0 (A)
ILTEX Lykoi	6–1	3–1 (H)	3–0 (A)	Round of 16	Iraklis	4–0	1–0 (A)	3–0 (H)
Paniliakos	5–1	3–1 (H)	2–0 (A)	Quarter-finals	Ialysos	3–1	2–0 (H)	1–1 (A)
Olympiacos	3–1	2–1 (H)	1–0 (A)	Semi-finals	Panachaiki	7–0	3–0 (H)	4–0 (A)

== Match ==
=== Details ===
16 April 1997
20:15 EEST

AEK Athens	0–0 (a.e.t.)	Panathinaikos
	Report
Penalties
Kopitsis (penalty scored); Borbokis (penalty scored); Nikolaidis (penalty scored); Doboş (penalty scored); Atmatsidis (penalty scored)	5–3	(penalty missed) Warzycha; (penalty scored) Konstantinidis; (penalty scored) Georgiadis; (penalty scored) Markos

Karaiskakis Stadium, Piraeus
Attendance: 21,926
Referee: Giorgos Psychomanis (Athens)

AEK Athens	Panathinaikos

GK	1	(Greece) Ilias Atmatsidis
RB	4	(Greece) Vasilios Borbokis	(yellow card) 10'
CB	6	(Greece) Stelios Manolas
CB	2	(Greece) Nikos Kostenoglou
LB	3	(Greece) Michalis Kasapis (c)	(yellow card) 42'
DM	5	(Greece) Triantafyllos Machairidis
CM	7	(North Macedonia) Toni Savevski		(substituted off) 98'
CM	10	(Georgia (country)) Temuri Ketsbaia	(yellow card) 25'
RW	8	(Greece) Daniel Batista
LW	9	(Greece) Christos Kostis		(substituted off) 83'
CF	11	(Greece) Demis Nikolaidis
Substitutes:
DF	14	(Romania) Anton Doboş		(substituted on) 120'
DF	16	(Greece) Charis Kopitsis	(yellow card) 110'	(substituted on) 83'
FW	15	(Brazil) Marcelo Veridiano		(substituted on) 98' (substituted off) 120'
Manager:
(Greece) Petros Ravousis

GK	1	(Poland) Józef Wandzik
RB	2	(Greece) Stratos Apostolakis (c)
CB	6	(Greece) Marinos Ouzounidis	(yellow card) 63'
CB	4	(Greece) Giannis Goumas	(yellow card) 47'
CB	8	(Greece) Georgios Alexopoulos	(yellow card) 3'	(substituted off) 105'
LB	3	(Greece) Thanasis Kolitsidakis	(yellow card) 35' (yellow-red card) 119'
DM	5	(Greece) Dimitris Markos	(yellow card) 24'
CM	7	(Greece) Giorgos Georgiadis
CM	10	(Albania) Bledar Kola		(substituted off) 97'
CF	11	(Greece) Alexis Alexoudis		(substituted off) 112'
CF	9	(Poland) Krzysztof Warzycha
Substitutes:
DF	16	(Greece) Kostas Konstantinidis		(substituted on) 105'
MF	15	(Greece) Georgios Kapouranis		(substituted on) 97'
FW	17	(Greece) Georgios Nasiopoulos		(substituted on) 112'
Manager:
(Croatia) Velimir Zajec

Assistant referees:
Christoforos Zografos (Athens)
Christos Ioannidis (Serres)
Fourth official:
Panagiotis Varouchas (Athens)

Match rules

- 90 minutes
- 30 minutes of extra time if necessary
- Penalty shootout if scores still level
- Five named substitutes
- Maximum of three substitutions

== See also ==
- 1996–97 Greek Football Cup
