= 1996 Greek Super Cup =

Panathinaikos	AEK Athens
1	1
- After extra time AEK Athens won 9–8 on penalties
- Date: 11 August 1996
- Venue: Karaiskakis Stadium, Piraeus
- Referee: Giannis Latsios (Larissa)
- Attendance: 21,926

The 1996 Greek Super Cup was the 8th edition of the Greek Super Cup, an association football match contested by the winners of the previous season's Alpha Ethniki and Greek Cup competitions. The match took place on 11 August 1996 at Karaiskakis Stadium. The contesting teams were the 1995–96 Alpha Ethniki champions, Panathinaikos and the 1995–96 Greek Cup winners, AEK Athens. AEK Athens won 9–8 on a penalty shoot-out after a 1–1 draw at the end of extra time.

== Venue ==
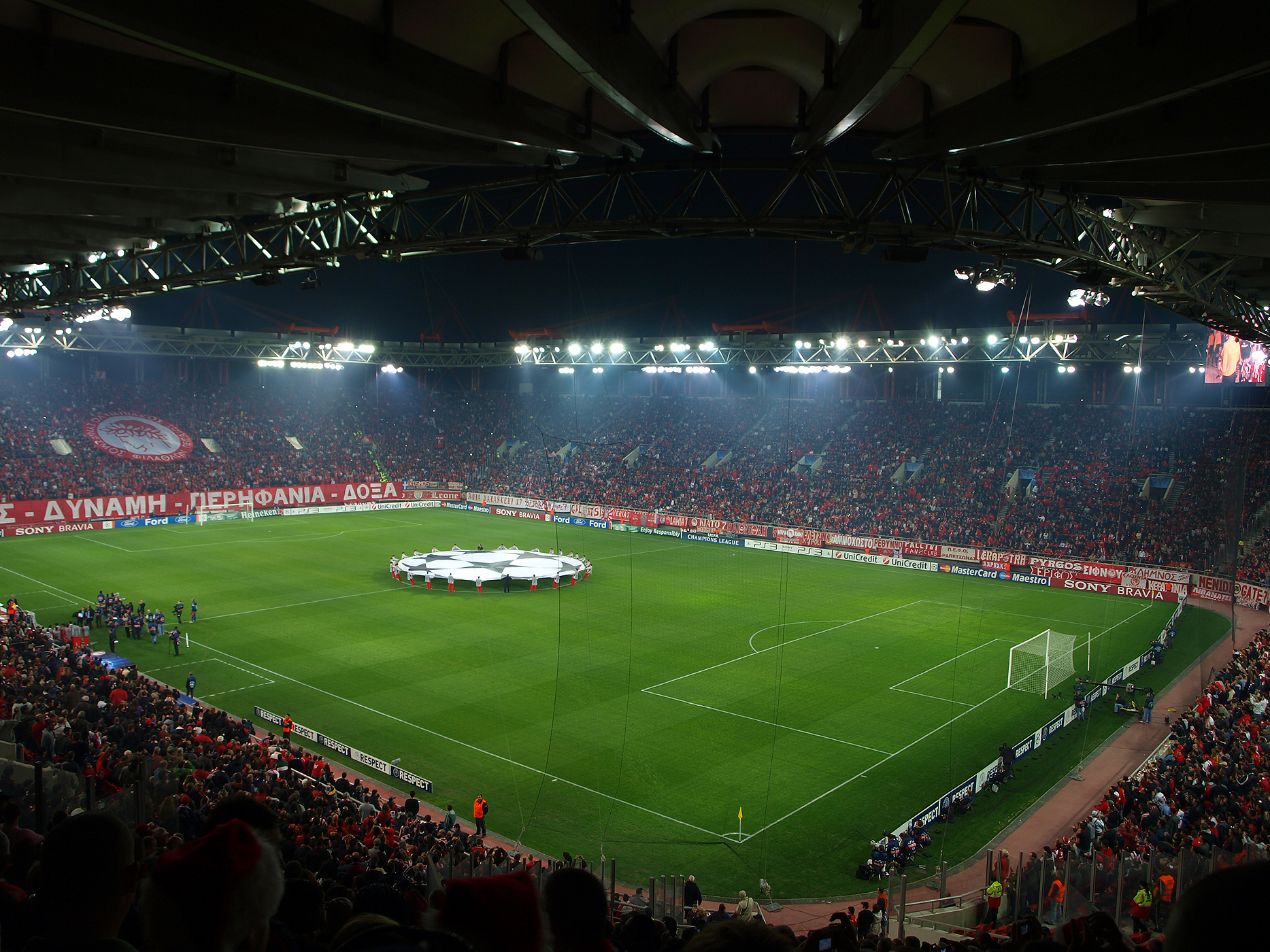
Karaiskakis Stadium.

This was the second Greek Super Cup held at Karaiskakis Stadium, after 1980.

Karaiskakis Stadium was built in 1895 and renovated once in 1964. The stadium is used as a venue for Olympiacos and Ethnikos Piraeus and was used for Greece in various occasions. Its current capacity is 42,000 and hosted a European Cup Winners' Cup final in 1971 and will host the fist leg of the 1971 Intercontinental Cup final.

== Background ==
Panathinaikos participated in the Greek Super Cup four times, winning three of them. The last time that they had played in the Super Cup was in 1994, where they had won against AEK Athens by 3–0.

AEK Athens participated in the Greek Super Cup four times, winning one of them. The last time that they had won the Super Cup was in 1989 (6–5 on penalties, which came after a 1–1 draw at the end of the extra time against Panathinaikos). The last time that they had played in the Super Cup was in 1994, where they lost to Panathinaikos by 3–0.

The two teams had met each other in the Super Cup three times in 1989, 1993 and 1994.

== Match ==
=== Details ===
11 August 1996
20:00 EEST (UTC+3)

Panathinaikos	1–1 (a.e.t.)	AEK Athens
Alexoudis 90'	Report	Savevski 88'
Penalties
Georgiadis (penalty missed); Christodoulou (penalty scored); Liberopoulos (penalty scored); Lagonikakis (penalty scored); Alexoudis (penalty missed); Markos (penalty scored); Nikopolidis (penalty scored); Marangos (penalty scored); Nasiopoulos (penalty scored); Kapouranis (penalty scored); Kolitsidakis (penalty missed)	8–9	(penalty missed) Kostis; (penalty missed) Maladenis; (penalty scored) Kopitsis; (penalty scored) Nikolaidis; (penalty scored) Ketsbaia; (penalty scored) Doboș; (penalty scored) Marcelo; (penalty scored) Manolas; (penalty scored) Kasapis; (penalty scored) Atmatsidis; (penalty scored) Kopitsis

Karaiskakis Stadium, Piraeus
Attendance: 21,926
Referee: Giannis Latsios (Larissa)

Panathinaikos	AEK Athens

GK	1	(Greece) Antonios Nikopolidis (c)
RB	2	(Greece) Angelos Basinas	(yellow card) 43'	(substituted off) 96'
CB	3	(Greece) Theofilaktos Nikolaidis	(yellow card) 24'	(substituted off) 58'
CB	4	(Greece) Thanasis Kolitsidakis
LB	5	(Greece) Dimitris Markos
DM	6	(Australia) Louis Christodoulou	(yellow card) 31'
CM	10	(Greece) Spyros Marangos
RM	8	(Greece) Nikos Liberopoulos
LM	11	(Albania) Bledar Kola		(substituted off) 67'
CF	7	(Greece) Georgios Nasiopoulos
CF	9	(Greece) Alexis Alexoudis	(yellow card) 36'
Substitutes:
GK	15	(Poland) Józef Wandzik
DF	16	(Greece) Giorgos Kapouranis		(substituted on) 58'
MF	13	(Greece) Andreas Lagonikakis		(substituted on) 96'
FW	14	(Greece) Georgios Ch. Georgiadis	(yellow card) 115'	(substituted on) 67'
Manager:
(Argentina) Juan Ramón Rocha

GK	1	(Greece) Ilias Atmatsidis
RB	2	(Greece) Vasilios Borbokis		(substituted off) 70'
CB	4	(Greece) Michalis Vlachos	(red card) 90+1'
CB	5	(Romania) Anton Doboș
LB	3	(Greece) Michalis Kasapis (c)
DM	6	(Greece) Christos Maladenis
CM	7	(Georgia (country)) Temur Ketsbaia
CM	8	(North Macedonia) Toni Savevski		(substituted off) 90+2'
AM	10	(Greece) Christos Kostis
CF	9	(Greece) Daniel Batista		(substituted off) 79'
CF	11	(Greece) Demis Nikolaidis	(yellow card) 13'
Substitutes:
GK	15	(Greece) Vasilis Karagiannis
DF	12	(Greece) Triantafyllos Machairidis
DF	13	(Greece) Charis Kopitsis	(yellow card) 81'	(substituted on) 70'
DF	16	(Greece) Stelios Manolas	(yellow card) 98'	(substituted on) 90+2'
FW	14	(Brazil) Marcelo Veridiano		(substituted on) 79'
Manager:
(Greece) Petros Ravousis

Assistant referees:
Giannis Abelakias (Thessaly)

Match rules

- 90 minutes
- 30 minutes of extra time if necessary
- Penalty shootout if scores still level
- Five named substitutes
- Maximum of three substitutions
