= Sozzani =

Sozzani (pronounced [sotˈtsaːni]) is an Italian surname from Lombardy, chiefly Pavia. Notable people with the surname include:

- Carla Sozzani (born 1947), Italian book and magazine editor, gallerist, and businesswoman
- Franca Sozzani (1950–2016), Italian journalist and magazine editor
- Marcelo Sozzani (born 1969), Argentine footballer
- Meli Valdés Sozzani (born 1977), Argentine painter
- Nino Sozzani (1889–1977), Italian general during World War II

== See also ==
- Sozzini family
