= Christos Maladenis =

Greek footballer and manager (born 1974)

Personal information
- Full name: Christos Maladenis
- Date of birth: 23 May 1974 (age 52)
- Place of birth: Xanthi, Greece
- Height: 1.85 m (6 ft 1 in)
- Positions: Midfielder; forward

Senior career*
Years	Team	Apps	(Gls)
1991–1995	Skoda Xanthi	85	(5)
1995–2004	AEK Athens	198	(42)
2004–2006	PAOK	50	(9)
2006–2007	Levadiakos	16	(2)
2007–2008	Panthrakikos	8	(0)
2008	Trikala		
2008–2009	Olympiakos Loutraki		
2009	Vihren Sandanski	11	(1)
2009–2010	Iasmos Rodopi		

International career
1994	Greece U21	2	(0)

Managerial career
- 2016: Asteras Magiko
- 2021–2022: Xanthi U19
- 2023: Apollon Xanthi
- 2023–2024: Xanthi
- * Club domestic league appearances and goals

Christos Maladenis (Greek: Χρήστος Μαλαδένης; born 23 May 1974) is a Greek former professional footballer who played as a midfielder and a manager.

== Career ==
Maladenis began his career in Skoda Xanthi. During his spell at the club he attracted the interest of Panathinaikos and AEK Athens.

On 14 June 1995, Maladenis was transferred to AEK Athens for a fee of 100 million drachmas. Despite the injuries he had, he slowly made his presence felt, competing in many positions in the lineup, mainly in the midfield and offense. His best season was the period 1998–1999, where he scored 13 goals. He also played an incredible match against Iraklis in Kaftanzoglio Stadium, completing a hat-trick in AEK's victory with 2-3 which secured them in second place and sent them in next season's UEFA Champions League qualifiers. Maladenis also scored goal in the final of Greek Cup against Ionikos, which AEK won with 3–0. His best moment of his career was arguably the goal against Real Madrid in a Champions League game at Nikos Goumas Stadium on 2 October 2002. He played in AEK until 2003, where he won 4 cups and 1 Super Cup.

In December 2003 Maladenis was released from AEK and on 30 January 2004 he signed a deal with PAOK for three years. In the summer of 2006 Maladenis signed for Levadiakos. The following seasons he played in Panthrakikos and Trikala. From January 2009 he played in Bulgarian side Vihren. He signed with the club from Sandanski on 8 January 2009 and has been given the number 7 shirt. Maladenis made his team debut a few days later, scoring in a 1–0 friendly win against Lokomotiv Plovdiv. He ended his professional career in 2010 at the amateur level in Iasmos Rodopi.

== Career statistics ==
Last update: 12 April 2018

Appearances and goals by club, season and competition
Club	Season	Division	Apps	Goals
Skoda Xanthi	1991–92	Alpha Ethniki	10	1
Skoda Xanthi	1992–93	Alpha Ethniki	18	0
Skoda Xanthi	1993–94	Alpha Ethniki	31	2
Skoda Xanthi	1994–95	Alpha Ethniki	26	2
AEK Athens	1995–96	Alpha Ethniki	28	1
AEK Athens	1996–97	Alpha Ethniki	22	0
AEK Athens	1997–98	Alpha Ethniki	27	9
AEK Athens	1998–99	Alpha Ethniki	25	13
AEK Athens	1999–2000	Alpha Ethniki	23	6
AEK Athens	2000–01	Alpha Ethniki	26	2
AEK Athens	2001–02	Alpha Ethniki	21	6
AEK Athens	2002–03	Alpha Ethniki	18	4
AEK Athens	2003–04	Alpha Ethniki	8	1
PAOK	2003–04	Alpha Ethniki	9	1
PAOK	2004–05	Alpha Ethniki	20	6
PAOK	2005–06	Alpha Ethniki	21	2
PAOK	2006–07	Alpha Ethniki	?	?
Levadiakos	2007–08	Beta Ethniki	16	2
Panthrakikos	2007–08	Beta Ethniki	8	0

== Honours ==
AEK Athens

- Greek Cup: 1995–96, 1996–97, 1999–2000, 2001–02
- Greek Super Cup: 1996
