= Michalis Kasapis =

Greek football player and manager (born 1971)

Personal information
- Full name: Michail Kasapis
- Date of birth: 6 June 1971 (age 55)
- Place of birth: Athens, Greece
- Height: 1.74 m (5 ft 9 in)
- Positions: Left back; left midfielder

Senior career*
Years	Team	Apps	(Gls)
1988–1993	Levadiakos	126	(6)
1993–2004	AEK Athens	254	(8)
Total		380	(14)

International career
1989–1994	Greece U21	7	(0)
1994–2002	Greece	37	(0)

Managerial career
- 2006–2009: Levadiakos (youth)
- 2009–2010: Fokikos
- 2010–2011: AEL Kalloni
- 2011–2012: Fokikos
- * Club domestic league appearances and goals

Michalis Kasapis (Greek: Μιχάλης Κασάπης; born 6 June 1971) is a Greek former professional footballer who played as a left back and a later manager. In 1995 he was voted as the second best Greek footballer and as one of the 22 best European players in 2001–02, he played in the Europe XI after he was called by the Johan Cruyff and he is considered one of the best Greek left backs to ever play the game.

== Club career ==
Kasapis started his career in 1988, playing for Levadiakos. He played five seasons for the club of Livadeia, where he became the captain of Greece U19.

On 23 June 1993 Kasapis was transferred to AEK Athens for a fee of 25 million drachmas. In his first season at AEK, he played as a left midfielder, being the only youngster of the roster that Bajević used as a starter and the very next season he played to a left back, where and established himself for the rest of his career. Speed, endurance, spirited play, good crosses and excellent balance in defensive and offensive tasks, were his main characteristics. For a number of years, he had an amazing partnership with Toni Savevski, on the left flank of the team. One of the worst moments in his career was his devastating punishment on 5 November 1999, when in a home match Olympiacos he attacked the match referee Dimitropoulos, in a match that AEK had huge complaints from the referee and was punished for 24 games. After these events he announced his departure from the national team alongside Nikolaidis and Atmatsidis, as a protest against refereeing in Greek football. An important goal of his career was the beautiful goal in November 1997 at a Cup match against Olympiacos at Nikos Goumas Stadium, in a year when AEK also won the trophy. The greatest moment of Kasapis' career was the call by Johan Cruyff to the Europe XI on 7 November 1995 at the Camp Nou, when in a match for charity where he played with footballers such as Maradona, Romário, Stoichkov and Zubizarreta. Kasapis is the first AEK footballer in appearances in European competitions having played 67 times. As a member of AEK he won one Championship, four Cups and one Super Cup, while at times he served as their captain. In the summer of 2004, he ended his football career, after the administrative and financial difficulties of the club.

== International career ==
Kasapis got 36 caps for Greece between 27 April 1994 and 2002. In 1999 he withdrew the national team with Demis Nikolaidis and Ilias Atmatsidis, as a protest for refereeing situation that prevailed at the time in Greece. Finally in 2001 he was convinced by the then coach Otto Rehhagel to return to the national team.

== After football ==
He started in 2006 as the coach of the youth team of Levadeakos and continued in 2009 at Fokikos for one season, the following season at AEL Kalloni, to return in February 2011 again to the Amfissa team. In February 2013 he assumed the technical leadership of AO Chalkida. On 5 September 2013 Kasapis returned to the AEK as scout and tactical analyst until July 2021.

== Career statistics ==
=== Club ===
Appearances and goals by club, season and competition
Club	Season	League			Greek Cup		Europe		Other (Note: Includes Greek Super Cup and Greek League Cup)		Total	
Club	Season	Division	Apps	Goals	Apps	Goals	Apps	Goals	Apps	Goals	Apps	Goals
Levadiakos	1988–89	Alpha Ethniki	11	0	?	?	—	—	—	—	11	0
Levadiakos	1989–90	Alpha Ethniki	32	0	?	?	—	—	3	0	35	0
Levadiakos	1990–91	Alpha Ethniki	24	0	?	?	—	—	—	—	24	0
Levadiakos	1991–92	Beta Ethniki	31	2	?	?	—	—	—	—	31	2
Levadiakos	1992–93	Beta Ethniki	28	4	?	?	—	—	—	—	28	4
AEK Athens	1993–94	Alpha Ethniki	29	3	7	0	2	0	1	0	39	3
AEK Athens	1994–95	Alpha Ethniki	25	1	8	0	8	0	1	0	42	1
AEK Athens	1995–96	Alpha Ethniki	28	0	11	0	4	0	0	0	43	0
AEK Athens	1996–97	Alpha Ethniki	30	1	6	2	6	0	1	0	43	3
AEK Athens	1997–98	Alpha Ethniki	30	0	1	1	6	0	—	—	37	1
AEK Athens	1998–99	Alpha Ethniki	26	1	1	0	3	0	—	—	30	1
AEK Athens	1999–2000	Alpha Ethniki	13	1	5	0	6	0	—	—	24	0
AEK Athens	2000–01	Alpha Ethniki	24	1	9	0	8	0	—	—	41	1
AEK Athens	2001–02	Alpha Ethniki	19	0	9	0	9	0	—	—	37	0
AEK Athens	2002–03	Alpha Ethniki	21	0	6	0	10	0	—	—	37	0
AEK Athens	2003–04	Alpha Ethniki	9	0	4	0	5	0	—	—	18	0
Career total			380	14	67	3	67	0	6	0	520	17

=== International ===
Appearances and goals by national team and year
National team	Year	Apps	Goals
Greece	1994	4	0
Greece	1995	8	0
Greece	1996	9	0
Greece	1997	3	0
Greece	1998	3	0
Greece	1999	6	0
Greece	2000	0	0
Greece	2001	3	0
Greece	2002	1	0
Total		37	0

Last updated: 2025-08-01
Source: Michalis Kasapis at National-Football-Teams.com

== Honours ==
AEK Athens

- Alpha Ethniki: 1993–94
- Greek Cup: 1995–96, 1996–97, 1999–2000, 2001–02
- Greek Super Cup: 1996
