= Theodoros Pakaltsis =

Greek footballer

Personal information
- Date of birth: 9 May 1978 (age 48)
- Place of birth: Ptolemaida, Greece
- Height: 1.91 m (6 ft 3 in)
- Position: Centre-back

Youth career
- Kozani

Senior career*
Years	Team	Apps	(Gls)
1994–2000	Veria	35	(0)
2000–2001	Panionios	0	(0)
2002–2003	Niki Volos		
2003–2004	Kallithea	6	(0)
2004	Poseidon Poros		
2004–2005	Kavala		
2005–2009	Olympiacos Volos	22	(0)
2009–2011	Doxa Drama	52	(4)
2011–2012	Panachaiki	13	(0)
2012–2013	Kavala	6	(0)
- * Club domestic league appearances and goals

Theodoros Pakaltsis (Greek: Θεόδωρος Πακάλτσης; born 9 May 1978) is a Greek former professional footballer who played as a centre-back.

Pakaltsis joined Veria F.C. in September 1994 and made 35 Alpha Ethniki appearances before the club was relegated after the 1998–99 season. He moved to Panionios F.C. in 2000, but did not make any league appearances for the club. He made 6 more appearances in the Alpha Ethniki with Kallithea F.C. during the 2003–04 season, but he has only played in the lower divisions since.
