= Nicolas Dikoumé =

Cameroonian footballer

Personal information
- Date of birth: November 21, 1973 (age 52)
- Place of birth: Yaoundé, Cameroon
- Height: 1.85 m (6 ft 1 in)
- Position: Striker

Senior career*
Years	Team	Apps	(Gls)
1994–1996	Canon Yaoundé		
1996–1999	Apollon Smyrnis	86	(20)
1999–2000	Skoda Xanthi	27	(2)
2001	Panelefsiniakos	9	(0)
2001–2002	Doxa Katokopia	23	(5)
2002–2003	Ethnikos Achna	24	(4)
2003–2004	Panachaiki	12	(3)
2004–2005	Niki Volos	26	(4)
2005–2008	Canon Yaoundé		

International career
1995–1996	Cameroon	0	(0)
- * Club domestic league appearances and goals

Nicolas Dikoumé (born November 21, 1973) is a Cameroonian former professional footballer who playing as a striker.

== Career ==
Dikoumé was born in Yaoundé. In 2005, after two seasons in Cyprus and seven seasons in Greece, he returned to his home club Canon Yaoundé.
