= Rastislav Tomovčík =

Slovak footballer and manager

Personal information
- Full name: Rastislav Tomovčík
- Date of birth: 12 April 1973 (age 53)
- Place of birth: Michalovce, Czechoslovakia
- Height: 1.80 m (5 ft 11 in)
- Position: Midfielder

Youth career
- Zemplín Michalovce

Senior career*
Years	Team	Apps	(Gls)
?–1995	Zemplín Michalovce		
1995–1998	HFC Humenné	76	(7)
1998–1999	Spartak Trnava	17	(2)
1999–2001	Inter Bratislava	27	(0)
2001–2002	1. FC Košice	18	(1)
2002	→ Ružomberok (loan)	30	(2)
2003	Ružomberok	1	(0)
2004–2005	Zemplín Michalovce		
2005–2007	Slovan Bratislava		
2007	→ Zemplín Michalovce (loan)		
2008–2011	Slavoj Trebišov		
2011–2012	ŠK Zalužice		

Managerial career
- 2008–2009: Slavoj Trebišov (assistant coach)
- 2010–2012: Topoľany
- 2012–: Strážske
- * Club domestic league appearances and goals as of 11 April 2013 ‡ National team caps and goals as of 11 April 2013

Rastislav Tomovčík (born 12 April 1973 in Michalovce) is a retired Slovak football midfielder who currently works as a head manager of Strážske.
