= Nikos Vavilis =

Greek footballer

Personal information
- Full name: Nikolaos Vavilis
- Date of birth: 5 August 1970 (age 56)
- Place of birth: Athens, Greece
- Height: 1.70 m (5 ft 7 in)
- Position: Defender

Senior career*
Years	Team	Apps	(Gls)
–1994	Atromitos		
1994–1996	Kalamata		
1996–1999	Ionikos		
2000–2003	Panachaiki		
2003–2004	Thrasyvoulos		
- * Club domestic league appearances and goals

Nikos Vavilis (Greek: Νίκος Βαβίλης; born 5 August 1970) is a retired Greek football defender.
