= Vasilios Borbokis =

Greek footballer (born 1969)

Vasilis Borbokis
Personal information
- Full name: Vasilios Borbokis
- Date of birth: 10 February 1969 (age 57)
- Place of birth: Serres, Greece
- Height: 1.80 m (5 ft 11 in)
- Positions: Right back; right wing back

Senior career*
Years	Team	Apps	(Gls)
1987–1993	Apollon Kalamarias	115	(19)
1993–1997	AEK Athens	86	(9)
1997–1999	Sheffield United	55	(6)
1999–2000	Derby County	16	(0)
2000–2002	PAOK	51	(9)
2002–2004	AEK Athens	43	(4)
2004–2005	Anorthosis Famagusta	1	(0)
Total		367	(47)

International career
1998	Greece	2	(0)

Managerial career
- 2013–2015: AEK Athens (assistant)
- 2015–2016: Atromitos (assistant)
- 2018–2021: Panetolikos (assistant)
- * Club domestic league appearances and goals

Vasilios Borbokis (Greek: Βασίλειος Μπορμπόκης; born 10 February 1969) is a Greek former professional footballer who played as a right back.

== Club career ==
Borbokis started his career at Apollon Kalamarias in 1987, where he played as a forward.

On 18 June 1993 he was transferred to the champions of Greece, AEK Athens. Under the manager Dušan Bajević he was relocated as an offensive right back, a position he was established for the rest of his career. In his first season he won the Championship. From his second season onwards he was established in the right side of the team's defense. During his a Championship, two Cups and a Super Cup.

On 23 June 1997 Borbokis was transferred to Sheffield United who were playing in the Championship for a fee of 400 million drachmas and became one of the first Greeks to play in England. He stayed at Sheffield United for two seasons, completing 55 appearances and scoring four goals, most notably his participation in the 1998 FA Cup semi-final against Newcastle. In this semi-final, he was faced with another Greek who was playing in England, Nikos Dabizas who was playing in Newcastle.

In 1999 he transferred to Derby County who played in the Premier League, managing to play in the top division of England. He stayed at Derby for a year, playing 20 games and scoring one goal in a League Cup match against Swansea. However, he lost his position as a key player after a jaw injury and in December 1999 he returned to Greece for PAOK to reunite with Dušan Bajević. In PAOK he played for two seasons, winning a Cup during this period.

In the summer of 2002 following the steps of Bajević, Borbokis returned to AEK. In his second spell at the club he made seven appearances in the Champions League, in the span of two seasons.

In the summer of 2004, his contract with AEK expired and on 3 August Borbokis moved to Cyprus and signed for Anorthosis Famagusta. There, despite appearing only once, he won the Championship. He retired at the end of the season.

== International career ==
Borbokis has played twice with national team of Greece during 1998.

== After football ==
In 2009 Borbokis took over as head of scouting for AEK and four years later, in 2013, the duties of assistant coach at AEK, being the direct collaborator of his former ally in the club Traianos Dellas, remaining by his side throughout his term in the "yellow-blacks". With the resignation of the latter in October 2015, he also left, following him to Atromitos, again as his assistant.

== Personal life ==
Borbokis hails from Mitrousi, Serres. He is the younger brother of the former Greek international, Stefanos.

== Honours ==
AEK Athens

- Alpha Ethniki: 1993–94
- Greek Cup: 1995–96, 1996–97
- Greek Super Cup: 1996

PAOK

- Greek Cup: 2000–01

Anorthosis Famagusta

- Cypriot First Division: 2004–05
