= Alekos Dedes =

Greek footballer

Personal information
- Full name: Alexandros Dedes
- Date of birth: 29 July 1972 (age 54)
- Place of birth: Meligalas, Greece
- Height: 1.80 m (5 ft 11 in)
- Position: Midfielder

Senior career*
Years	Team	Apps	(Gls)
1995–1997	Kalamata		
1997–2000	OFI		
2000–2001	Paniliakos		
2001–2003	PAS Giannina		
2003–2004	Thrasyvoulos		
2004–2005	PAS Giannina		
2005–2007	Messiniakos		
2007–2009	Kalamata		
2009–2010	Messiniakos		
2010–2011	Sparta		
- * Club domestic league appearances and goals

Alekos Dedes (Greek: Αλέκος Δέδες; born 29 July 1972) is a retired Greek football midfielder.
