= Ilias Atmatsidis =

Greek footballer (born 1969)

Personal information
- Date of birth: 24 April 1969 (age 57)
- Place of birth: Kozani, Greece
- Height: 1.85 m (6 ft 1 in)
- Position: Goalkeeper

Youth career
- –1989: Pontioi Kozani

Senior career*
Years	Team	Apps	(Gls)
1989–1992	Pontioi Veria	100	(0)
1992–2003	AEK Athens	251	(1)
2003–2005	PAOK	33	(0)
Total		284	(1)

International career
1994–1999	Greece	47	(0)
- * Club domestic league appearances and goals

Ilias Atmatsidis (Greek: Ηλίας Ατματσίδης; born 24 April 1969) is a Greek former professional footballer who played as a goalkeeper. He is the director of Football at AEK Athens B.

== Club career ==
Atmatsidis started playing football regularly in his village team at the age of 13 competing as a winger. In a match against Foufa Ptolemaidas where the team's goalkeeper could not compete, Atmatsidis was called to play as goalkeeper. His performance established him in the position under the team's goalposts. He was then transferred to the team of the neighboring village of Agios Dimitrios, with which he was crowned champion of the local second division. He was then transferred to Pontioi Kozani where he played in the fourth national division. In July of 1989 he joined Pontioi Veria, where he played for 3 years contributing to the promotion of the team to the second division. On 24 June 1992 he was transferred to AEK Athens for a fee of 40 million drachmas.

In his first year in the team he was the substitute of Antonis Minou, but from the following season he established himself as a starter for many years, while he was among the captains of the club. A remarkable performance of Atmatsidis was when he made a double save on a penalty by Anastasiou and then on a shot by Tsiantakis in a championship match with OFI. In 1998 and 1999 he was voted as the best goalkeeper of the league in the PSAP awards. He scored once with a penalty in a crucial championship match against Skoda Xanthi on 23 May 1999. He had another outstanding performance in the league derby against Olympiacos in 1997, where he kept the clean seat and AEK won by 0–1. From 2000 onwards he began to lose his position to Dionysis Chiotis. He won in his 10-year presence at AEK two Championships, four Cups and 1 Super Cup. On 10 January 2003 the Atmatsidis asked to be released to get more playing time and his contract was terminated by mutual consent.

Ον 17 January Atmatsidis signed for PAOK. In the club of Thessaloniki he spent 3 seasons and he won another Cup in 2003, before retiring in 2005. In January 2014 he came out of retirement to play for local Herakleion based club Omonia NOVA Apolimantiki.

== International career ==
Atmatsidis debuted for Greece on 23 March 1994. He played 47 matches, and was included in the 1994 FIFA World Cup, playing as starting goalkeeper in the 0–4 loss against Bulgaria. In November 1999, he decided to retire from the national team, as a sign of protest against refereeing in Greek football.

== After football ==
In October 2014, Atmatsidis has been in the technical department of the infrastructure departments of AEK until 2019, when he was for a short period an assistant manager to Nikos Kostenoglou. In July 2021 he was appointed as a Director of Football at AEK Athens B.

== Honours ==
AEK Athens

- Alpha Ethniki: 1992–93, 1993–94
- Greek Cup: 1995–96, 1996–97, 1999–2000, 2001–02
- Greek Super Cup: 1996

PAOK

- Greek Cup: 2002–03

Individual

- Super League Greece Goalkeeper of the Year: 1997–98, 1998–99
