= Tasos Zachopoulos =

Greek footballer

Personal information
- Full name: Anastasios Zachopoulos
- Date of birth: 4 February 1975 (age 51)
- Position: Defender

Senior career*
Years	Team	Apps	(Gls)
1993–1998	Aris	59	(0)
1998–1999	Panionios	32	(0)
1999–2000	Trikala	11	(0)
- * Club domestic league appearances and goals

Tasos Zachopoulos (Greek: Τάσος Ζαχόπουλος; born 4 February 1975) is a Greek former professional footballer who played as a defender.

He started his senior career in Aris Thessaloniki. After three years as a backup player, he featured semi-regularly in the 1996-97 Alpha Ethniki. He played as a regular center-back for Aris in 1997–98 Beta Ethniki and then he returned to the Alpha Ethniki in 1998 when contracted by Athens club Panionios. He played regularly there, and featured in all six matches of Panionios's 1998-99 UEFA Cup Winners' Cup campaign. In 1999 he nonetheless went on to Trikala.
