= Dimitris Deligiannis =

Greek footballer (born in 1972)

Personal information
- Full name: Dimitrios Deligiannis
- Date of birth: 9 October 1972 (age 54)
- Position: Midfielder

Senior career*
Years	Team	Apps	(Gls)
1991–1996	Pierikos		
1996–2001	Ionikos		
- Apollon Kalamarias
- * Club domestic league appearances and goals

Dimitris Deligiannis (Greek: Δημήτρις Δεληγιάννης; born 9 October 1972) is a retired Greek football midfielder.
