= Charis Kopitsis =

Greek footballer and coach

Personal information
- Full name: Charilaos Kopitsis
- Date of birth: 5 March 1969 (age 57)
- Place of birth: Athens, Greece
- Positions: Right back; midfielder

Youth career
- Anagennisi Karditsa

Senior career*
Years	Team	Apps	(Gls)
1984–1986	Orfeas Egaleo		
1986–1987	Egaleo	27	(3)
1987–1992	Panionios	83	(2)
1992–2001	AEK Athens	178	(10)
2001–2002	Egaleo	3	(0)
2002	Panionios	0	(0)
2002–2003	Panelefsiniakos		

Managerial career
- 2004–2005: AEK Athens U17
- 2008–2014: AEK Athens U17
- 2016–2019: AGS Nea Peramos
- 2019: Akratitos
- 2020: Akratitos
- * Club domestic league appearances and goals

Charis Kopitsis (Greek: Χάρης Κοπιτσής; born 5 March 1969) is a former Greek professional footballer and manager. He is the Director of Football at Egaleo.

== Club career ==
Kopitsis started his career in 1984 at Orfeas Egaleo and in the summer of 1986 he was moved to Egaleo. He played there for a season and a half, competing in the second and third division.

In December 1987 he was transferred to Panionios, where he gradually earned a starting position the following season, when the team reached the final of the Greek Cup in 1989. However, he did not play in the final. On 1 December 1992 Kopitsis was transferred to AEK Athens.

He played mainly as a right back, but also as a right midfielder. In his many years of career in AEK, he was a key player and a substitute player at other times, but he always had an active participation in the team. He had remarkable performance in April 1993 at the crucial home derby against Panathinaikos, where he unleashed a firebolt and made the final 3–1 for AEK, he even saw a red card because he took off his shirt in celebration. In January 1994 he also had a great performance against the same opponent scoring the first of the 2 goals, with a power shot, that led AEK to win the match and eventually the title. Kopitsis won two Championships, three Cups and a Super Cup with AEK. He was released from the club in the summer of 2001.

On 10 August 2001 Kopitsis returned to Egaleo, where he spend a season. Afterwards he returned to Panionios, as well. However, he did not manage to find a starting position. Thus, he moved to Panelefsiniakos in the fourth division, where he ended his career at the end of the season.

== After football ==
Kopitsis started working at the academies of AEK. In April 2016, he was also elected a member of the Board of Directors of Amateur AEK. From 2020 he became the director of football at Egaleo and at the same time he worked as a coach at Akratitos.

== Honours ==
AEK Athens

- Alpha Ethniki: 1992–93, 1993–94
- Greek Cup: 1995–96, 1996–97, 1999–2000
- Greek Super Cup: 1996
