= Nikos Kostenoglou =

Greek footballer and manager (born 1970)

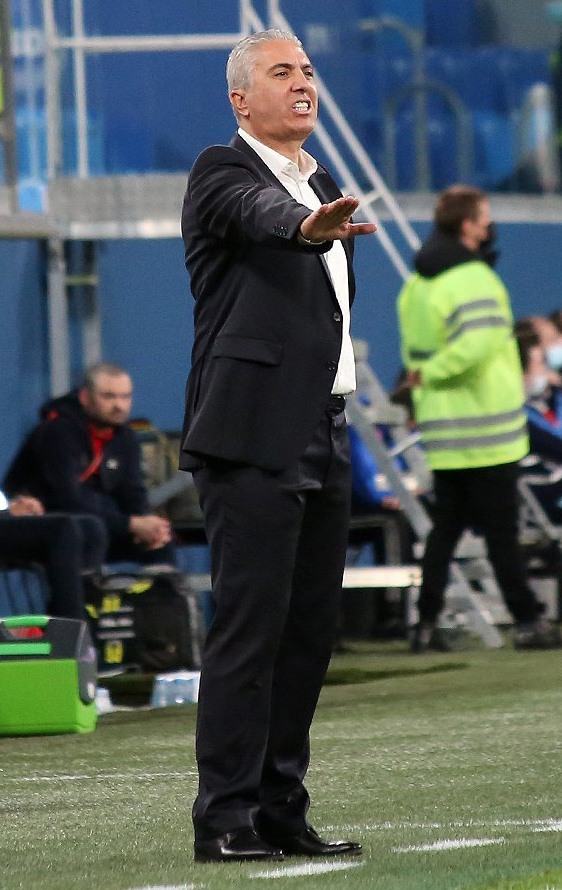
- Kostenoglou in 2021

Personal information
- Full name: Nikolaos Kostenoglou
- Date of birth: 3 October 1970 (age 56)
- Place of birth: Kavala, Greece
- Height: 1.80 m (5 ft 11 in)
- Position: Defender

Youth career
- 1984–1988: Nea Karvali

Senior career*
Years	Team	Apps	(Gls)
1988–1994	Skoda Xanthi	131	(2)
1994–2005	AEK Athens	222	(5)
Total		353	(7)

International career
1996	Greece	1	(0)

Managerial career
- 2005–2007: AEK Athens U20
- 2007–2008: AEK Athens (assistant)
- 2008: AEK Athens
- 2008–2009: Asteras Tripolis
- 2011: AEL
- 2011–2012: AEK Athens
- 2012: Skoda Xanthi
- 2014: Anorthosis Famagusta
- 2014: Apollon Smyrnis
- 2015–2016: Greece (assistant)
- 2017: Aris
- 2018: Doxa Drama
- 2019: AEK Athens U19
- 2019: AEK Athens
- 2021–2022: Cyprus
- 2023: Chicago Fire (assistant)
- 2024–2025: AEK Athens B
- * Club domestic league appearances and goals

Nikos Kostenoglou (Greek: Νίκος Κωστένογλου; born 3 October 1970) is a Greek football manager and former professional footballer who played as a defender.

== Club career ==
Kostenoglou started his career as a football player in 1989 at Skoda Xanthi. On 15 June 1994 he was transferred to AEK Athens for 100 million drachmas.

He became a regular in the following season, alongside Stelios Manolas. Kostenoglou played mainly in the position of centre-back, but he was also used as a right-back and was distinguished for his speed, his correct placements, his clean play but also for his seriousness and morals. Known for his faith in the Orthodox doctrine, he acquired the nickname "Father" (Greek: "Πάτερ"). He was never the star player of AEK, but he was a player with a lot of participations, usually as a starter and with a stable performances, while he was at times one of the leaders of the "yellow-blacks". With AEK he won 4 Greek cups and 1 Super Cup. He finished his career at AEK Athens, in the season the summer 2005 after 11 years of presence at the club.

== International career ==
Kostenoglou played once with Greece in a 2–1 friendly win over Israel in Chalcis on 24 January 1996.

== Managerial career ==
After finishing his playing career Kostenoglou joined the coaching staff at AEK Athens Academy. Two years later he was promoted to assistant to Lorenzo Serra Ferrer in the men's team. On 13 February 2008 Ferrer was sacked and Kostenoglou took over until the end of the season. AEK Athens were the best team that season, clinched first position in the league, but lost the championship due to legal action. Kostenoglou stepped down as coach on 16 May 2008 following the hiring of Georgios Donis.

On 20 November 2008, he was announced as the new manager of Asteras Tripolis, in January 2011, he succeeded Jørn Andersen as manager of AEL. On 6 October 2011, he returned to AEK Athens for a second spell as manager, replacing Manolo Jiménez. His contract came to an end on 25 June 2012.

In following periods he had brief spells at Skoda Xanthi in 2012 and Anorthosis Famagusta in 2014. while in July of the same year he was hired by Apollon Smyrnis in the second division, from which he left in December.

On 12 February 2015 he assumed the duties of assistant to the also newly hired Sergio Markarián in the Greece. The latter cited the tense relations between them as one of the reasons for his resignation the following July, with the dismissal of Kostenoglou contained in the same announcement where the HFF announced the departure of the first coach. On 28 February 2017, Aris announced Kostenoglou as their new manager, to finish the season. On 23 January 2018 it was announced by Doxa Drama, however, their cooperation was terminatedon 23 April.

On 4 February 2019, Kostenoglou was hired by AEK Athens as the technical manager of their academy. He was also temporarily the coach of their U19 squad.

He became head coach of Cyprus on 18 February 2021.

== Managerial statistics ==
As of match played 30 June 2025

Managerial record by team and tenure
Team	Nat	From	To	Record					Ref.
Team	Nat	From	To	G	W	D	L	Win %	Ref.
AEK Athens	(Greece)	12 February 2008	16 May 2008	18	10	5	3	55.56	
Asteras Tripolis	(Greece)	20 November 2008	18 May 2009	25	9	7	9	36.00	
AEL	(Greece)	9 January 2011	26 May 2011	13	3	5	5	23.08	
AEK Athens	(Greece)	6 October 2011	25 June 2012	38	15	9	14	39.47	
Skoda Xanthi	(Greece)	30 September 2012	2 December 2012	8	1	3	4	12.50	
Anorthosis Famagusta	(Cyprus)	5 February 2014	31 May 2014	16	1	2	13	6.25	
Apollon Smyrnis	(Greece)	1 July 2014	8 December 2014	11	6	3	2	54.55	
Aris	(Greece)	28 February 2017	21 June 2017	16	12	3	1	75.00	
Doxa Drama	(Greece)	22 January 2018	23 April 2018	15	8	3	4	53.33	
AEK Athens	(Greece)	26 August 2019	8 December 2019	13	7	3	3	53.85	
Cyprus	(Cyprus)	18 February 2021	27 June 2022	18	2	5	11	11.11	
AEK Athens B	(Greece)	5 December 2024	30 June 2025	26	5	10	11	19.23	
Career Total				217	79	58	80	36.41	—

== Honours ==
AEK Athens

- Greek Cup: 1995–96, 1996–97, 1999–2000, 2001–02
- Greek Super Cup: 1996
