= Anton Doboș =

Romanian footballer

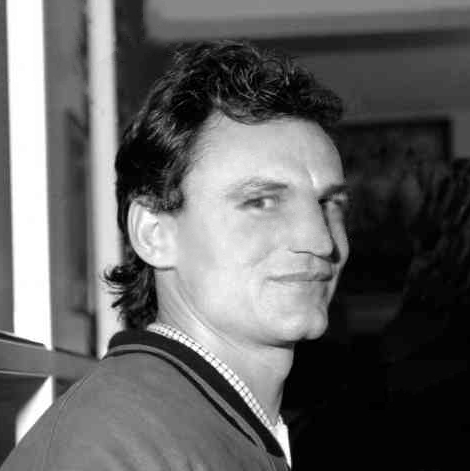
- Doboș in 1995

Personal information
- Date of birth: 13 October 1965 (age 61)
- Place of birth: Sărmaşu, Romania
- Height: 1.83 m (6 ft 0 in)
- Position: Centre back

Youth career
- 1981–1985: Sticla Arieșul Turda

Senior career*
Years	Team	Apps	(Gls)
1985–1987	Sticla Arieșul Turda		
1985–1986	→ Progresul Brăila (loan)		
1988–1989	Universitatea Cluj	46	(5)
1989–1991	Dinamo București	47	(2)
1992–1996	Steaua București	134	(6)
1996–1999	AEK Athens	41	(5)
1999	Ethnikos Piraeus	2	(0)
Total		270	(18)

International career
1993–1998	Romania	23	(1)

Managerial career
- 2004: Politehnica Timişoara (caretaker)
- * Club domestic league appearances and goals

Anton Doboș (born 13 October 1965) is a Romanian former professional football player and football manager who primarily played as a centre-back.

He made 23 appearances for the Romania national football team, scoring one goal, and participated in UEFA Euro 1996 and the 1998 FIFA World Cup.

He won Romanian league titles with Dinamo București and Steaua București, and also played for Greek club AEK Athens.

== Club career ==
Doboș began his football career in the early 1980s with Sticla Arieșul Turda. In the 1985–86 season, he played for Progresul Brăila, before returning to Arieșul Turda and subsequently joining Universitatea Cluj around 1987. After establishing himself as a regular at Universitatea Cluj, he moved to Dinamo București in 1989. With Dinamo, he won the Liga I and the Cupa României in the 1989–90 season.

During the 1992 season, he moved to Steaua București. He played for Steaua until the 1995–96 season, winning four consecutive league titles from 1992–93 to 1995–96. He also won the Cupa României twice and the Romanian Super Cup twice. His consistent performances during this period also earned him a call-up to the Romania national team.

In the summer of 1996, Greek club AEK Athens signed Doboș to replace their regular centre-back Stelios Manolas. Manolas had withdrawn from team activities following a dispute with club president Michalis Trochanas, and Doboș joined AEK in July 1996. He was regarded as an experienced defender with good positioning and technical ability.

After a change in the club's ownership led to Manolas's return, Doboș faced competition for a starting place. However, manager Petros Ravousis devised a system to play the two defenders together. During his time at AEK, Doboș won the Greek Cup and the Greek Super Cup. After his contract with AEK expired in the summer of 1999, he moved to Ethnikos Piraeus of the Greek second division, retiring from football at the end of the 1999–2000 season.

== International career ==
Doboș made his debut for the Romania national football team on 22 September 1993 in a friendly match against Israel. He remained with the national team until 1998, making 23 international appearances and scoring one goal.

Doboș scored his only international goal on 6 September 1997 in a 1998 FIFA World Cup qualifying match against Liechtenstein. He scored in the 37th minute, as Romania won the match 8–1. The victory was one of Romania's largest wins in World Cup qualifying.

Doboș was included in Romania's squads for UEFA Euro 1996 and the 1998 FIFA World Cup. UEFA Euro 1996 was held in England, where Romania were eliminated in the group stage. At the 1998 FIFA World Cup in France, he appeared in the group stage, and his final international appearance came on 26 June in a 1–1 draw against Tunisia.

== Managerial career ==
Doboș served as president of Politehnica Timișoara from 2002 to 2005. At the time, the club used the name Politehnica AEK in reference to Greek club AEK Athens, where Doboș had spent the latter part of his playing career. He was involved in the club's administration and, in October 2002, publicly commented as club president on a change of manager.

In November 2007, Doboș accepted an offer to become president of Universitatea Cluj. The Cluj-Napoca local council, which was a major shareholder of the club at the time, appointed him as president, and Doboș continued to serve in the role in 2008.

== Personal life ==
On 31 August 2008, Dobos had a serious car accident, which left him in a coma. He recovered after about a day and was again able to communicate with his family. But he remained with loss of memory.

"I am feeling OK now, I am doing my treatment and resting. I haven't fully recovered yet though, I still have memory problems. If I know Lăcătuş? I know him just from what I saw on tape, but I do not recognize him. Only his name. I was also surprised when I learned that I was president of Poli Timișoara and Universitatea Cluj. I don't even remember that I've played football", said Anton Doboș in EVZ.

== Playing statistics ==
Appearances and goals by national team and year
National team	Year	Apps	Goals
Romania	1993	1	0
Romania	1994	0	0
Romania	1995	3	0
Romania	1996	7	0
Romania	1997	8	1
Romania	1998	4	0
Total		23	1

Scores and results list Romania's goal tally first, score column indicates score after each Doboș goal.

List of international goals scored by Anton Doboș
No.	Date	Venue	Opponent	Score	Result	Competition
1	6 September 1997	Sportpark, Eschen, Liechtenstein	Liechtenstein	4–0	8–1	1998 FIFA World Cup qualification

== Honours ==
Dinamo București

- Divizia A: 1989–90
- Cupa României: 1989–90

Steaua București

- Divizia A: 1992–93, 1993–94, 1994–95, 1995–96
- Cupa României: 1991–92, 1995–96
- Supercupa României: 1994, 1995

AEK Athens

- Greek Cup: 1996–97
- Greek Super Cup: 1996
