= Marcelo Sozzani =

Argentine footballer (born 1969)

Personal information
- Full name: Marcelo Adrián Sozzani Latrecchiana
- Date of birth: 15 January 1969
- Place of birth: Temperley, Argentina
- Position: Defender

Senior career*
Years	Team	Apps	(Gls)
1990–1991	Racing Club	17	(0)
1992–1993	Club San José		
1994	Club Blooming		
1995	Alianza Lima		
1997	Skoda Xanthi	13	(1)
1998–1999	Wilstermann		
2000	Unión Tarija		
2001–2002	Wilstermann		
2003–2004	Unión Tarija		
- * Club domestic league appearances and goals

Marcelo Adrián Sozzani Latrecchiana (born 15 January 1969) is an Argentine former professional footballer who last played as a defender for Unión Tarija.

== Career ==
Sozzani played for Peruvian side Alianza Lima, where he was described as "had a not very positive start to the season in La Victoria, yet he "kept rowing it", as they would say in his country, and little by little he got into the hearts of the blue and white fans".

== Style of play ==
Sozzani mainly operated as a defender and was described as "had a good aerial game that allowed him to clear and be unbeatable in high balls".

== Personal life ==
After retiring from professional football, Sozzani moved to the United States.
