= Daniel Batista Lima =

Greek footballer and manager (born 1964)

Daniel Batista
Personal information
- Full name: Daniel Batista Lima
- Date of birth: 9 September 1964 (age 62)
- Place of birth: Mindelo, São Vicente, Cape Verde
- Height: 1.85 m (6 ft 1 in)
- Position: Forward

Team information
- Current team: Ethnikos Piraeus (technical director)

Youth career
- 1980: Castilho (Mindelo)
- 1983–1985: Feyenoord
- 1985–1986: Excelsior

Senior career*
Years	Team	Apps	(Gls)
1986–1989	Ethnikos Piraeus	67	(14)
1989–1992	AEK Athens	90	(39)
1992–1995	Olympiacos	78	(16)
1995–1999	AEK Athens	77	(28)
1999–2001	Aris	5	(0)
Total		317	(97)

International career
1994–1997	Greece	14	(2)

Managerial career
- 2003–2007: Diagoras
- 2007–2008: Fostiras
- 2008: Lamia
- 2008–2009: AO Nea Ionia
- 2009–2013: AEK Athens U20
- 2013: Peramaikos
- 2014–2015: Niki Volos (technical director)
- 2021–: Ethnikos Piraeus (technical director)
- * Club domestic league appearances and goals

Daniel Batista Lima (Greek: Ντανιέλ Μπατίστα Λίμα; born 9 September 1964) is a former professional footballer who played as a forward. Born in Cape Verde, he represented Greece internationally. He is the technical director of Ethnikos Piraeus.

== Club career ==
Batista started his football career at the academies of Feyenoord Rotterdam. After a while playing there, a friend of him who was also a supporter of Feyenoord brought him to Greece to follow his career there. Batista played for Ethnikos Piraeus, where his impressiver performances soon attracted the interest of the major Greek clubs. In the summer of 1989 despite the interest from Olympiacos the player preferred to sign for AEK Athens, despite the appeals of Ethnikos Piraeus, who claimed that he was still under contract with their side.

It didn't take long for him to impress at AEK as well. He started very well from his very first season at AEK, even though he had some injuries. Alongside Patikas and Christodoulou, he formed a good trio in the "yellow-black" offense. The following season was not a good one for the team, but Batista again had a very good season, while among other things he also scored the winning goal against Olympiacos. In both of these years, Batista played mainly as a striker, but the arrival of Dimitriadis and Alexandris in the summer of 1991, made Bajević to play Batista behind the two strikers, in order to "fit" all of them in the starting eleven. Batista formed an excellent duo with Dimitriadis in the attack and helped AEK to win the Championship, while also having excellent performance in the UEFA Cup, scoring at all home games against the likes of Vlaznia Shkodër, Spartak Moscow and Torino.

In the summer of 1992, with the expiration of his contract and during a period of administrative changes at AEK, he moved to Olympiacos, displeasing the people of the "yellow-blacks". In the club of Piraeus, he had a good presence, but did not reach the high standards he had at AEK. Nevertheless, he scored multiple times against his former club.

In the summer of 1995, Batista returned to AEK Athens. His performances played a big part in winning the Cup, scoring 2 times in the final with Apollon Athens. In following season, despite facing some injuries, he created an excellent partnership in the offense alongside Kostis and Nikolaidis. At the end of the season AEK were crowned Cup winner for a seacond season in a row. In the following two seasons he contributed to club, despite his injuries. With AEK he won 1 Championship, 2 Cups, 2 Super Cup and 1 League Cup.

In the summer of 1999, Batista was released from the AEK and on 30 July he signed for Aris. Batista retired in the summer of 2001 at the age of 36.

== International career ==
Batista became a naturalized citizen of Greece and debuted in the Greece national team on 12 October 1994. At the time, he held the distinction of being the only Greek athlete of black ethnicity to achieve this. He played 14 times scoring twice.

== Managerial career ==
After his playing days were over, Batista coached Diagoras, Fostiras, he was the director of football of Lamia, head coach of AO Nea Ionia, AEK Athens U20, Peramaikos and a technical director of Niki Volos. From the summer of 2021 he is the technical director of Ethnikos Piraeus.

== Personal life ==
Batista's uncle, Noni Lima was a former footballer who had a successful career in Greece at Panionios. His nephew and Noni's son, Konstantinos is also a footballer.

== Career statistics ==
National team	Season	Apps	Goals
Greece	1994	6	1
Greece	1995	6	0
Greece	1996	2	1
Total		14	2

== Honours ==
AEK Athens

- Alpha Ethniki: 1991–92
- Greek Cup: 1995–96, 1996–97
- Greek Super Cup: 1989, 1996
- Greek League Cup: 1990
- Pre-Mediterranean Cup: 1991

Olympiacos

- Greek Super Cup: 1992
