= Theofilaktos Nikolaidis =

Greek footballer

Personal information
- Date of birth: 21 July 1973 (age 53)
- Place of birth: Drama, Greece
- Height: 1.78 m (5 ft 10 in)
- Position: Midfielder

Senior career*
Years	Team	Apps	(Gls)
1994–1995	Kavala	39	(6)
1995–1999	Panathinaikos	22	(0)
1999–2000	Apollon Athens	22	(1)
2000–2001	Panachaiki	20	(0)
2001–2003	PAS Giannina	25	(3)
2003–2004	Kavala	48	(0)
2004	Skoda Xanthi	15	(0)
2005	Doxa Drama	15	(0)
2005–2006	Kastoria		
2006–2008	Enosi Alexandroupoli		
2008	Prosotsani		
- * Club domestic league appearances and goals

Theofilaktos Nikolaidis (Greek: Θεοφύλακτος Νικολαΐδης, born 21 July 1973) is an ex Greek footballer who last played for Prosotsani F.C. in Delta Ethniki.

Nikolaidis played for several clubs in the Super League Greece, including most recently Skoda Xanthi
