= Thanasis Kolitsidakis =

Greek footballer

Personal information
- Full name: Athanasios Kolitsidakis
- Date of birth: 21 November 1966 (age 59)
- Place of birth: Thessaloniki, Greece
- Height: 1.82 m (6 ft 0 in)
- Position: Defender

Team information
- Current team: Acharnaikos (team manager)

Senior career*
Years	Team	Apps	(Gls)
1988–1993	Apollon Smyrnis	146	(2)
1993–1998	Panathinaikos	105	(1)
1998–1999	Apollon Smyrnis	14	(0)
1999–2005	OFI	142	(1)
Total		411	(4)

International career
1992–1994	Greece	13	(0)

Managerial career
- 2009–2010: Atsalenios
- 2010: Kalamata
- 2011–2012: Episkopi
- 2012–2015: Irodotos
- 2015: Atromitos (assistant)
- 2016: OFI (assistant)
- 2017: Thyella Rafina
- 2017–2018: AEEK SYN.KA
- 2018–2019: Ermionida
- 2020–2021: Doxa Drama
- 2024–2025: Apollon Smyrnis (assistant)
- 2025–2026: Aris Cholargos
- 2026–: Acharnaikos (team manager)
- * Club domestic league appearances and goals

Thanasis Kolitsidakis (Greek: Θανάσης Κολιτσιδάκης, born 21 November 1966) is a Greek football manager and former player.

== Career ==
A defender, Kolitsidakis played most of his career for Apollon Smyrnis, Panathinaikos and OFI.

He made 14 appearances for the Greece national team, and was a participant at the 1994 FIFA World Cup.
