= Alexis Alexoudis =

Greek footballer

Personal information
- Full name: Alexandros Alexoudis
- Date of birth: 20 June 1972 (age 54)
- Place of birth: Florina, Greece
- Height: 1.85 m (6 ft 1 in)
- Position: Forward

Youth career
- Ermis Amyntaio
- Antagoras Kos
- –1988: Doxa Drama

Senior career*
Years	Team	Apps	(Gls)
1989–1990	Panelefsiniakos	?	(?)
1990–1994	OFI	74	(18)
1994–2000	Panathinaikos	77	(17)
2000	Ethnikos Asteras	1	(1)
2001	OFI	13	(0)

International career
1994	Greece	4	(1)
- * Club domestic league appearances and goals

Alexis Alexoudis (Greek: Αλέξης Αλεξούδης; born 20 June 1972) is a Greek former footballer. Alexoudis played most of his career for OFI and Panathinaikos.

He played for Greece national team (4 matches/one goal), and was a participant at the 1994 FIFA World Cup.

From 22 November 1995 to 1 October 1997 he was at the top of the list for the fastest goals in UEFA Champions League history, thanks to a goal he scored after just 28.46 seconds into Panathinaikos' home match against Aalborg BK.

== Honours ==
Panathinaikos

- Alpha Ethniki: 1995, 1996
