= Christos Kostis =

Greek footballer

Personal information
- Full name: Christos Kostis
- Date of birth: 15 January 1972 (age 54)
- Place of birth: Thessaloniki, Greece
- Height: 1.79 m (5 ft 10 in)
- Positions: Forward; attacking midfielder

Youth career
- Aetos Diavaton
- Veria

Senior career*
| Years | Team | Apps | (Gls) |
| 1989–1994 | Iraklis | 110 | (26) |
| 1994–1998 | AEK Athens | 105 | (55) |
| 1998–2000 | Anderlecht | 0 | (0) |
| 2000–2005 | AEK Athens | 7 | (1) |
| 2005–2006 | Alki Larnaca | 19 | (3) |
| 2006–2007 | Ajax Cape Town | 2 | (0) |
| Total | | 243 | (85) |

International career
| 1993–1997 | Greece | 15 | (4) |
- * Club domestic league appearances and goals

Christos Kostis (Greek: Χρήστος Κωστής, born 15 January 1972) is a Greek former professional footballer who played as a forward. Kostis is widely regarded to be one of the most technical players Greece has ever produced, but his great injury in 1997 stopped his from making a big career. His nickname was "the Greek Cruyff" (Greek: "ο Έλληνας Κρόιφ").

== Club career ==
=== Iraklis ===
Kostis begun his professional career at Iraklis, where at a young age became the club's best striker. This made AEK Athens and Olympiacos battle for his signature during the summer of 1994. The officials of Olympiacos and Iraklis agreed for the transfer and on 31 May Kostis took a flight for Athens in order to sign his new contract with the red and whites. Surprisingly, he found the officials of AEK Athens waiting for him at the airport, as during the flight they made a better offer to Iraklis and acquired him for fee at time of 350 million drachmas.

=== AEK Athens ===
His first season in the team, was a period of adjustment, nevertheless he was the team's first player in appearances in the league scoring 11 times. The following season alongside Batista, Tsiartas, Ketsbaia and Savevski, he formed an incredible offensive midfield line. On 28 October 1995 he scored in the derby against Olympiacos at home making the final 1–1. In 18 November of the same year, he also scored the winner in the Athenian derby against Panathinaikos. On 3 January 1996 he scored at the away win against Olympiacos for the first leg of the round of 16 for the cup. Competing during this particular season mainly on the left flank of the attack, he was again first in appearances in the league scoring 19 times, while he won the Cup with the yellow-blacks. His best season was in 1996–97, where he won the cup again, while he was again their first player in league appearances and the top scorer with 21 goals. He scored again in the league game against Olympiacos making the final 2–0 for AEK on 13 January 1997. But at the start of the next season his career was cut short when on 23 October 1997 he got seriously injured after a collision with the goalkeeper of Sturm Graz, Kazimierz Sidorczuk during the first leg of the second round of the Cup Winners' Cup. Since then he has virtually never been able to become the same player again. During his spell at AEK he won three Cups and one Super Cup.

=== Later career ===
Kostis underwent surgery, underwent treatments and in the summer 1998, while he was still injured, he signed for Anderlecht, but did not manage to play at all for the Belgian team.

On 19 July 2000, after various surgeries, he returned to AEK, but a series of new injuries prevented him from returning in his previous form. Thus, despite his efforts to return at a competitive level and the support of the administration of AEK, he eventually did not succeed. During his second spell at the club he made only seven league appearances. In the summer of 2005 he moved to Cyprus and signed for Alki Larnaca for one season. Afterwards, he moved to Ajax Cape Town, where he finished his career in the summer of 2007.

== International career ==
He debuted for Greece on 10 March 1993 and went to score 4 times during his 15 caps.

== After football ==
Kostis during the period 2012–13 was the general captain of the football department of AEK.

== Career statistics ==
=== Club ===
As of 11 October 2024

Appearances and goals by club, season and competition
| Club | Season | League | | | National Cup | | Continental | | Super Cup | | Total | |
| Club | Season | Division | Apps | Goals | Apps | Goals | Apps | Goals | Apps | Goals | Apps | Goals |
|---|---|---|---|---|---|---|---|---|---|---|---|---|
| Iraklis | 1989–90 | Alpha Ethniki | 2 | 1 | 0 | 0 | — | | — | | 2 | 1 |
| Iraklis | 1990–91 | Alpha Ethniki | 17 | 0 | 0 | 0 | 1 (Note: Appearances in UEFA Cup) | 0 | — | | 18 | 0 |
| Iraklis | 1991–92 | Alpha Ethniki | 31 | 2 | 0 | 0 | — | | — | | 31 | 2 |
| Iraklis | 1992–93 | Alpha Ethniki | 30 | 12 | 0 | 0 | — | | — | | 30 | 12 |
| Iraklis | 1993–94 | Alpha Ethniki | 30 | 11 | 0 | 0 | 1 (Note: Appearances in UEFA Intertoto Cup) | 1 | — | | 31 | 12 |
| Iraklis | Total | | 110 | 26 | 0 | 0 | 2 | 1 | — | | 112 | 27 |
| AEK Athens | 1994–95 | Alpha Ethniki | 31 | 11 | 9 | 0 | 8 (Note: Two appearances in UEFA Champions League qualifiers and six in UEFA Champions league group stage League) | 0 | 1 | 0 | 49 | 11 |
| AEK Athens | 1995–96 | Alpha Ethniki | 34 | 19 | 13 | 8 | 2 (Note: Appearances in UEFA Cup Winners' Cup) | 0 | — | | 49 | 27 |
| AEK Athens | 1996–97 | Alpha Ethniki | 34 | 21 | 8 | 1 | 5 | 2 | 1 | 0 | 48 | 24 |
| AEK Athens | 1997–98 | Alpha Ethniki | 6 | 4 | 0 | 0 | 3 | 1 | — | | 9 | 5 |
| AEK Athens | Total | | 105 | 55 | 30 | 9 | 18 | 3 | 2 | 0 | 155 | 65 |
| Anderlecht | 1998–99 | Belgian First Division | 0 | 0 | 0 | 0 | — | | — | | 0 | 0 |
| Anderlecht | 1999–00 | Belgian First Division | 0 | 0 | 0 | 0 | — | | — | | 0 | 0 |
| Anderlecht | Total | | 0 | 0 | 0 | 0 | 0 | 0 | 0 | 0 | 0 | 0 |
| AEK Athens | 2000–01 | Alpha Ethniki | 7 | 1 | 5 | 2 | — | | — | | 12 | 3 |
| AEK Athens | 2001–02 | Alpha Ethniki | 0 | 0 | 4 | 1 | — | | — | | 4 | 1 |
| AEK Athens | 2002–03 | Alpha Ethniki | 0 | 0 | 2 | 0 | — | | — | | 2 | 0 |
| AEK Athens | 2003–04 | Alpha Ethniki | 0 | 0 | 1 | 1 | — | | — | | 1 | 1 |
| AEK Athens | 2004–05 | Alpha Ethniki | 0 | 0 | 0 | 0 | — | | — | | 0 | 0 |
| AEK Athens | Total | | 7 | 1 | 12 | 4 | 0 | 0 | 0 | 0 | 19 | 5 |
| Alki Larnaca | 2005–06 | Cypriot Second Division | 19 | 3 | 0 | 0 | — | | — | | 19 | 3 |
| Ajax Cape Town | 2006–07 | Premier Soccer League | 2 | 0 | 0 | 0 | — | | — | | 2 | 0 |
| Career total | | | 243 | 85 | 42 | 13 | 20 | 4 | 2 | 0 | 307 | 102 |

=== International ===
| National team | Season | Apps | Goals |
|---|---|---|---|
| Greece | 1993 | 1 | 0 |
| Greece | 1994 | 4 | 2 |
| Greece | 1995 | 2 | 0 |
| Greece | 1996 | 4 | 0 |
| Greece | 1997 | 4 | 2 |
| Total | | 15 | 4 |

Last updated: 3 March 2010
Source: Christos Kostis at National-Football-Teams.com

Christos Kostis: International goals
| No. | Date | Venue | Opponent | Score | Result | Competition |
|---|---|---|---|---|---|---|
| 1 | 1994-04-27 | Athens Olympic Sports Complex, Athens, Greece | Saudi Arabia | 4–1 | 5–1 | Friendly |
| 2 | 1994-04-27 | Athens Olympic Sports Complex, Athens, Greece | Saudi Arabia | 5–1 | 5–1 | Friendly |
| 3 | 1997-01-22 | Jerusalem, Israel | Israel | 0–1 | 1–1 | Friendly |
| 4 | 1997-03-12 | Paralimni Stadium, Paralimni, Cyprus | Cyprus | 0–2 | 0–4 | Friendly |

== Honours ==
AEK Athens

- Greek Cup: 1996–97, 1999–2000, 2001–02
- Greek Super Cup: 1996
