= Georgios Nasiopoulos =

Greek footballer (born in 1973)

Personal information
- Full name: Georgios Nasiopoulos
- Date of birth: 25 May 1973 (age 53)
- Place of birth: Chalastra, Greece
- Height: 1.71 m (5 ft 7 in)
- Position: Forward

Senior career*
Years	Team	Apps	(Gls)
1992–1994	Asteras Ampelokipon	57	(20)
1994–1996	Edessaikos	46	(19)
1996–1997	Panathinaikos	31	(6)
1998–1999	Kavala	43	(19)
1999–2001	Panathinaikos	45	(6)
2001–2003	Iraklis	27	(2)
2003	Chalkidona	4	(1)
2004–2005	Digenis Morphou	34	(12)
2005	APOEL	7	(1)
2006	Panachaiki	16	(5)
2006–2007	Veria	26	(5)
2007–2008	Eordaikos		

International career
1996	Greece	1	(0)
- * Club domestic league appearances and goals

Georgios Nasiopoulos (Greek: Γεώργιος Νασιόπουλος; born 25 May 1973) is a retired Greek football striker.
