= 1995–96 Greek Football Cup =

1995–96 Greek Cup
Tournament details
- Country: Greece
- Teams: 72

Final positions
- Champions: AEK Athens (10th title)
- Runners-up: Apollon Athens

Tournament statistics
- Matches played: 117
- Top goal scorer(s): Demis Nikolaidis (10 goals)

The 1995–96 Greek Football Cup was the 54th edition of the Greek Football Cup.

== Tournament details ==
Totally 72 teams participated, 18 from Alpha Ethniki, 18 from Beta, and 36 from Gamma. It was held in 6 rounds, included final.

After the group stage, AEK Athens eliminated in succession Iraklis, Olympiacos, Panathinaikos and Athinaikos, while in a big surprise Apollon Athens qualified in semi-finals against PAOK, with 3–1 in Toumba Stadium. For one more time, AEK Athens and Panathinaikos were drawn as opponents in the groups round, in order to be balloted again confronted in quarter-finals. In the final, Demis Nikolaidis played his last match as footballer of Apollon Athens, a few days before his transfer to AEK Athens.

AEK Athens won the cup after 13 years, shattering with 7–1 Apollon Athens, that reached for first and only time a Greek Cup final. AEK won the last title, after 4 championships, with Dušan Bajević as their coach.

== Calendar ==
Round	Date(s)	Fixtures	Clubs	New entries
Group stage	20 August, 5, 25 October & 9 November 1995	56	72 → 32	72
Round of 32	29 November, 20 December 1995	32	32 → 16	none
Round of 16	3, 17 January 1996	16	16 → 8	none
Quarter-finals	31 January, 14 February 1996	8	8 → 4	none
Semi-finals	28 February, 13 March 1996	4	4 → 2	none
Final	15 May 1996	1	2 → 1	none

== Group stage ==
The phase was played in a single round-robin format.

=== Group 1 ===
Pos	Team	Pts
1	Panathinaikos	12
2	AEK Athens	9
3	Panegialios	6
4	Olympiacos Volos	1
5	Almopos Aridea	1

=== Group 2 ===
Pos	Team	Pts
1	Panachaiki	10
2	AO Pyrgos	9
3	Chaidari	4
4	Anagennisi Karditsa	3
5	Kallithea	3

=== Group 3 ===
Pos	Team	Pts
1	Apollon Athens	12
2	Panelfsiniakos	5
3	Atromitos	4
4	Kalamata	4
5	Ambelokipoi Thessaloniki	2

=== Group 4 ===
Pos	Team	Pts
1	Agios Nikolaos	10
2	Anagennisi Giannitsa	8
3	Ethnikos Piraeus	7
4	Chalkida	3
5	Doxa Drama	0

=== Group 5 ===
Pos	Team	Pts
1	Aris	10
2	Ialysos	7
3	EAR	6
4	Lamia	3
5	Charavgiakos	3

=== Group 6 ===
Pos	Team	Pts
1	Iraklis	10
2	Doxa Vyronas	7
3	Ethnikos Asteras	6
4	Aiolkos	4
5	Eordaikos	1

=== Group 7 ===
Pos	Team	Pts
1	PAOK	12
2	AO Chania	7
3	Korinthos	4
4	Pierikos	4
5	Kozani	1

=== Group 8 ===
Pos	Team	Pts
1	Trikala	9
2	Athinaikos	9
3	Proodeftiki	7
4	PAS Giannina	4
5	Tyrnavos	0

=== Group 9 ===
Pos	Team	Pts
1	Fokikos	6
2	OFI	5
3	Kastoria	4
4	Apollon Krya Vrysi	1

=== Group 10 ===
Pos	Team	Pts
1	Pontioi Veria	9
2	Paniliakos	4
3	Apollon Larissa	2
4	Diagoras – Rodos Enosis	1

=== Group 11 ===
Pos	Team	Pts
1	Apollon Kalamarias	6
2	AEL	6
3	Anagennisi Kolindros	4
4	Orestis Orestiada	1

=== Group 12 ===
Pos	Team	Pts
1	Olympiacos	9
2	Veria	2
3	Panserraikos	2
4	Pannafpliakos	2

=== Group 13 ===
Pos	Team	Pts
1	Ionikos	7
2	Agrotikos Asteras	5
3	Fostiras	2
4	Marko	1

=== Group 14 ===
Pos	Team	Pts
1	Kavala	7
2	Varvasiakos	6
3	Edessaikos	4
4	Panargiakos	0

=== Group 15 ===
Pos	Team	Pts
1	Nigrita	7
2	Panetolikos	6
3	Panionios	2
4	Velissario	1

=== Group 16 ===
Pos	Team	Pts
1	Skoda Xanthi	7
2	Niki Volos	4
3	Levadiakos	4
4	Naoussa	1

== Knockout phase ==
Each tie in the knockout phase, apart from the final, was played over two legs, with each team playing one leg at home. The team that scored more goals on aggregate over the two legs advanced to the next round. If the aggregate score was level, the away goals rule was applied, i.e. the team that scored more goals away from home over the two legs advanced. If away goals were also equal, then extra time was played. The away goals rule was again applied after extra time, i.e. if there were goals scored during extra time and the aggregate score was still level, the visiting team advanced by virtue of more away goals scored. If no goals were scored during extra time, the winners were decided by a penalty shoot-out. In the final, which were played as a single match, if the score was level at the end of normal time, extra time was played, followed by a penalty shoot-out if the score was still level.
The mechanism of the draws for each round is as follows:

- There are no seedings, and teams from the same group can be drawn against each other.

== Bracket ==
Round of 32
Panetolikos	3	1	4
Varvasiakos	0	0	0
Apollon Athens	2	3	5
Paniliakos	1	3	4
Agrotikos Asteras	1	0	1
Skoda Xanthi (a)	1	0	1
Apollon Kalamarias	3	1	4
Kavala	0	3	3
Fokikos	0	0	0
PAOK	1	5	6
Ionikos	4	4	8
Panelefsiniakos	0	2	2
AO Chania	2	0	2
Trikala (a.e.t.)	0	4	4
Ialysos	3	2	5
Agios Nikolaos	1	3	4
Nigrita	1	1	2
Olympiacos	4	3	7
AEK Athens	1	2	3
Iraklis	0	0	0
Doxa Vyronas	1	2	3
AEL	0	1	1
Panachaiki	2	0	2
Panathinaikos	2	3	5
Niki Volos	1	0	1
OFI	3	0	3
Anagennisi Giannitsa	1	1	2
Aris	0	3	3
Athinaikos	4	3	1
Pontioi Veria	0	1	1
AO Pyrgos	0	1	1
Veria	0	2	2

Round of 16
Panetolikos	1	2	3
Apollon Athens	2	2	4
Skoda Xanthi	2	3	5
Apollon Kalamarias	0	0	0
PAOK	4	1	5
Ionikos	1	0	1
Trikala	2	2	4
Ialysos	0	0	0
Olympiacos	1	1	2
AEK Athens	3	1	4
Doxa Vyronas	0	1	1
Panathinaikos	2	3	5
OFI	1	0	1
Aris	0	2	2
Athinaikos	5	2	7
Veria	2	1	3

Quarter-finals
Apollon Athens	4	1	5
Skoda Xanthi	0	2	2
PAOK	3	2	5
Trikala	0	1	1
AEK Athens	3	2	5
Panathinaikos	1	2	3
Aris	2	0	2
Athinaikos	1	2	3

Semi-finals
Apollon Athens	1	3	4
PAOK	1	1	2
AEK Athens	5	1	7
Athinaikos	0	0	0

Final
Apollon Athens	1
AEK Athens	7

== Round of 32 ==
Team 1	Agg.	Team 2	1st leg	2nd leg
Niki Volos	1–3	OFI	1–3	0–0
Ialysos	5–4	Agios Nikolaos	3–1	2–3
AO Pyrgos	1–2	Veria	0–0	1–2
Apollon Athens	5–4	Paniliakos	2–1	3–3
AO Chania	2–4	Trikala	2–0	0–4 (a.e.t.)
Athinaikos	7–1	Pontioi Veria	4–0	3–1
Panachaiki	2–5	Panathinaikos	2–2	0–3
AEK Athens	3–0	Iraklis	1–0	2–0
Apollon Kalamarias	4–3	Kavala	3–0	1–3
Panetolikos	4–0	Varvasiakos	3–0	1–0
Nigrita	2–7	Olympiacos	1–4	1–3
Ionikos	8–2	Panelefsiniakos	4–0	4–2
Agrotikos Asteras	1–1 (a)	Skoda Xanthi	1–1	0–0
Fokikos	0–6	PAOK	0–1	0–5
Doxa Vyronas	3–1	AEL	1–0	2–1
Anagennisi Giannitsa	2–3	Aris	1–0	1–3

== Round of 16 ==
Team 1	Agg.	Team 2	1st leg	2nd leg
Doxa Vyronas	1–5	Panathinaikos	0–2	1–3
Panetolikos	3–4	Apollon Athens	1–2	2–2
OFI	1–2	Aris	1–0	0–2
PAOK	5–1	Ionikos	4–1	1–0
Olympiacos	2–4	AEK Athens	1–3	1–1
Trikala	4–0	Ialysos	2–0	2–0
Skoda Xanthi	5–0	Apollon Kalamarias	2–0	3–0
Athinaikos	7–3	Veria	5–2	2–1

== Quarter-finals ==
Team 1	Agg.	Team 2	1st leg	2nd leg
AEK Athens	5–3	Panathinaikos	3–1	2–2
PAOK	5–1	Trikala	3–0	2–1
Aris	2–3	Athinaikos	2–1	0–2
Apollon Athens	5–2	Skoda Xanthi	4–0	1–2

== Semi-finals ==
=== Summary ===
Team 1	Agg.	Team 2	1st leg	2nd leg
AEK Athens	6–0	Athinaikos	5–0	1–0
Apollon Athens	4–2	PAOK	1–1	3–1

=== Matches ===
28 February 1996
19:00 EET

AEK Athens	5–0	Athinaikos
Batista 19', 40', 90'; Kopitsis 24'; Kostis 73'	Report (page 4)

Nikos Goumas Stadium, Nea Filadelfeia
Attendance: 6,500
Referee: Michalis Kalathenos (Dodecanese)
13 March 1996
15:00 EET

Athinaikos	0–1	AEK Athens
	Report (page 4)	Kostenoglou 88'

Vyronas National Stadium, Vyronas
Attendance: 545
Referee: Malamas Tevekelis (Thessaloniki)

AEK Athens won 6–0 on aggregate.

28 February 1996

Apollon Athens	1–1	PAOK
Nikolaidis 58'	Report (page 4)	Alexiou 12'

Rizoupoli Stadium, Rizoupoli
Referee: Manolis Papatriantafyllou (Kilkis)
13 March 1996

PAOK	1–3	Apollon Athens
Gioukoudis 40' (pen.)	Report (page 4)	Kola 24'; Nikolaidis 67', 75'

Toumba Stadium, Thessaloniki
Referee: Giannis Latsios (Larissa)

Apollon Athens won 4–2 on aggregate.

== Final ==
15 May 1996
17:30 EEST

Apollon Athens	1–7	AEK Athens
Barnjak 78'	Report (page 5)	Batista 11', 34'; Tsiartas 22', 48' (pen.), 76'; Ketsbaia 60'; Kostis 89'

Olympic Stadium, Marousi
Attendance: 31,563
Referee: Christos Sotiropoulos (Piraeus)
