= 1998–99 AEK Athens F.C. season =

AEK Athens
1998–99 season
- Chairman: Lakis Nikolaou (until 19 October); Kostas Generakis
- Manager: Dragoslav Stepanović (until 30 October); Takis Karagiozopoulos (interim, until 24 November); Oleg Blokhin
- Stadium: Nikos Goumas Stadium
- Alpha Ethniki: 2nd
- Greek Cup: First round
- UEFA Cup: First round
- Top goalscorer: League: Demis Nikolaidis (22); All: Demis Nikolaidis (28)
- Highest home attendance: 20,364 vs Vitesse (29 September 1998)
- Lowest home attendance: 3,663 vs Ethnikos Piraeus (16 May 1999)
- Average home league attendance: 10,169
- Biggest win: AEK Athens 6–0 Aris
- Biggest defeat: Vitesse 3–0 AEK Athens
Home colours

The 1998–99 season was the 75th season in the existence of AEK Athens F.C. and the 40th consecutive season in the top flight of Greek football. They competed in the Alpha Ethniki, the Greek Cup and the UEFA Cup. The season began on 22 August 1998 and finished on 30 May 1999.

== Overview ==
The summer started with ambition for the club, since ENIC, the multinational company that owned AEK had the time to proceed with transfers and build a strong team. The administration of Lakis Nikolaou negotiated with high-profile managers and came close to appointing Joachim Löw, but eventually hired Dragoslav Stepanović. The club's most important signing of the summer was Vasilios Lakis, who was also strongly pursued by Olympiacos, Panathinaikos and PAOK. The transfers of Akis Zikos and Dimitris Markos also stood out, but the gap in the defensive line, after the retirement of the club's captain and long-time regular, Stelios Manolas remained unfilled.

In the UEFA Cup, AEK were drawn against Ferencváros for the second qualifying round. At Stadion Albert Flórián, the yellow-blacks got off to a nervous start and were swept away by the Magyars, trailing early in the match. The Hungarians scored a second goal on the half hour and they went to the locker rooms with a 2–0 lead, while by the 83rd minute the score became 4–0, turning the match into a nightmare for the Greek club. AEK pulled off a reaction in the stoppage time and with two goals claimed the chances of qualifying at the rematch of Athens. Two weeks later at Nea Filadelfeia, AEK, led by Demis Nikolaidis who scored a hat-trick by the 26th minute, took the qualification, while they also scored a fourth goal at the 65th minute. The first round of the UEFA Cup brought AEK against the Dutch Vitesse, who was widely known to the Greek fans due to the presence of Nikos Machlas. At the GelreDome AEK controlled the match in the first half, however, the second half began with a missed penalty by Machlas in the 50th minute, which Laros converted into a goal on the rebound, while three minutes later the Dutch made it 2–0 and Kasapis was sent off with a second yellow. In stoppage time, Machlas scored Vitesse's third goal, which left AEK with little chance of qualifying ahead of the rematch. The Nea Filadelfeia Stadium was almost full, but Machlas with an early goal put an end to AEK's qualification hopes. Nikolaidis responded with a goal almost immediately, but again Machlas three minutes later gave the Dutch the 2–1 lead. AEK were disjointed and after three goals in the opening twenty minutes, the match became an open contest with chances being missed on both sides and despite the dismissal of Westerfeld before the end of the half, Vitesse scored a third goal. AEK chased to score in the second half and tried to even get the win but failed to do so with the match ending in a 3–3 draw, which resulted in their elimination.

Stepanović started well, but his presence on the bench was not convincing and he was eventually sacked after the 7th matchday. Takis Karagiozopoulos briefly took charge as interim manager, before Oleg Blokhin was hired. At the same time Dimitris Melissanidis took over the management of the club.

In the Cup, AEK were eliminated from early on after they suffered a shock defeat in their first match from third–tier club, Poseidon Michaniona, with a poor performance by the team.

In January the squad was strengthened with signings of Michalis Kapsis, Branko Milovanović, while Wreh and Méndez joined on loan from Arsenal. AEK subsequently won both derbies against Olympiacos and Panathinaikos in Nikos Goumas Stadium with 2–0. They also defeated Aris 6–0 and Panelefsiniakos 6–2. AEK were ultimately unable to claim the Championship from Olympiacos, but they managed to beat Panathinaikos in the race for second place that led to the next season's Champions League qualifiers. Demis Nikolaidis was the club's top scorer in the league with 22 goals.

=== Journey to Beligrade ===
In April 1999, a friendly match was organised against Partizan in Belgrade, during the height of the NATO bombing of Serbia by the initiative of Dimitris Melissanidis. As a gesture of compassion and solidarity towards the embattled Serbs, the AEK players and management staff defied the international embargo and traveled to Belgrade for the match. AEK's staff, alongside political figures such as Manolis Glezos, arrived in the Serbian capital amid moving events by Serbs offering Greeks bread and salt, a symbol of Serbian hospitality. After a stop at the Presidential Palace, where AEK conveyed the message of support of the Greek people, the team arrived at Partizan Stadium.

About 15,000 supporters of both clubs were present, despite the fact that all 40,000 tickets were sold. The reason people were less than the sold tickets, was the fuel, as there was a shortage and transportation was difficult. It was worth noting that this was the first time since the beginning of the war that no sirens were heard during the day. The players of both teams entered the pitch together, holding a banner that read "NATO stop the war, stop the bombing". The score was 1–1, when at the 68th minute thousands of Serbian supporters invaded the pitch to embrace the footballers, which resulted in the end of the match. The conduction of the match eventuallyf became an object of admiration by the European Press.

== Management team ==
Position	Staff
Manager	(Ukraine) Oleg Blokhin
Assistant manager	(Greece) Takis Karagiozopoulos
Goalkeeping coach	(Greece) Lakis Stergioudas
Fitness Coach	(Greece) Tasos Dimou
Academy director	(Greece) Andreas Stamatiadis
Academy manager	(Greece) Giorgos Karafeskos
Head of Medical	(Greece) Lakis Nikolaou

== Players ==
=== Squad information ===
NOTE: The players are the ones that have been announced by the AEK Athens' press release. No edits should be made unless a player arrival or exit is announced. Updated 30 May 1999, 23:59 UTC+3.

No.	Player	Nat.	Position(s)	Date of birth (Age)	Signed	Previous club	Transfer fee	Contract until
Goalkeepers
1	Ilias Atmatsidis (Vice-captain)	(Greece)	GK	24 April 1969 (aged 30)	1992	(Greece) Pontioi Veria	₯40,000,000	2002
15	Chrysostomos Michailidis	(Greece)	GK	15 January 1975 (aged 24)	1997	(Greece) Eordaikos	Free	2002
17	Kostas Daditsos	(Greece)	GK	7 December 1982 (aged 16)	1998	(Greece) AEK Athens U20	—	2000
22	Vasilis Karagiannis	(Greece)	GK	27 September 1969 (aged 29)	1993	(Greece) Diagoras	₯20,000,000	2000
Defenders
5	Boban Babunski	(North Macedonia)	CB	5 May 1968 (aged 31)	1998	(Japan) Gamba Osaka	₯330,000,000	2000
6	Nikos Kostenoglou	(Greece)	CB / RB	3 October 1970 (aged 28)	1994	(Greece) Skoda Xanthi	₯70,000,000	2003
12	Charis Kopitsis	(Greece)	RB / RM / LB / LM	5 March 1969 (aged 30)	1992	(Greece) Panionios	Free	2001
13	Vaios Karagiannis	(Greece)	LB / CB	25 June 1968 (aged 31)	1990	(Greece) A.O. Karditsa	₯11,000,000	2000
21	Michalis Kasapis	(Greece)	LB / LM	6 August 1971 (aged 27)	1993	(Greece) Levadiakos	₯25,000,000	2002
24	Alvin Ceccoli	(Australia)	LB	5 August 1974 (aged 24)	1999	(Australia) Wolves	Free	1999
25	Giannis Kalitzakis	(Greece)	CB	10 February 1966 (aged 33)	1997	(Greece) Panathinaikos	₯23,800,000	2000
31	Anton Doboș	(Romania)	CB	13 October 1965 (aged 33)	1996	(Romania) Steaua București	₯60,000,000	1999
32	Michalis Kapsis	(Greece)	CB	18 October 1973 (aged 25)	1999	(Greece) Ethnikos Piraeus	₯80,000,000	2003
Midfielders
2	Vasilios Lakis	(Greece)	RM / RW / AM / CM / RB	10 September 1976 (aged 22)	1998	(Greece) Paniliakos	₯320,000,000	2003
3	Dimitris Markos	(Greece)	CM / DM / LB / LM	31 January 1971 (aged 28)	1998	(Greece) Kalamata	Free	2001
7	Christos Maladenis	(Greece)	CM / RM / LM / AM / DM / RW / LW / SS	23 May 1974 (aged 25)	1995	(Greece) Skoda Xanthi	₯100,000,000	2000
8	Toni Savevski	(North Macedonia)	CM / LM / DM	14 July 1963 (aged 35)	1988	(North Macedonia) Vardar	₯34,000,000	2001
14	Akis Zikos	(Greece)	DM / CM	1 June 1974 (aged 25)	1998	(Greece) Skoda Xanthi	₯130,000,000	2002
16	Arnar Grétarsson	(Iceland)	CM / DM	20 February 1972 (aged 27)	1997	(Iceland) Leiftur	Free	2000
18	Evripidis Katsavos	(Greece)	CM / DM / RM	14 September 1973 (aged 25)	1997	(Greece) Veria	Free	2001
19	Kelvin Sebwe	(Liberia)	AM / SS	4 April 1972 (aged 27)	1997	(Greece) Skoda Xanthi	₯350,000,000	2003
23	Alberto Méndez	(Germany) (Spain)	AM	24 October 1974 (aged 24)	1999	(England) Arsenal	Free	1999
27	Branko Milovanović	(Federal Republic of Yugoslavia)	AM	24 October 1974 (aged 24)	1999	(Portugal) Vitória de Guimarães	₯200,000,000	2002
28	Giorgos Passios	(Greece) (Australia)	DM / CM / CB	4 May 1980 (aged 19)	1997	(Greece) AEK Athens U20	—	2003
Forwards
9	Paraschos Zouboulis	(Greece)	ST	30 August 1970 (aged 28)	1998	(Greece) PAOK	₯10,000,000	1999
10	Christopher Wreh	(Liberia)	ST / SS	14 May 1975 (aged 24)	1999	(England) Arsenal	Free	1999
11	Demis Nikolaidis (Captain)	(Greece) (Germany)	ST / SS	17 September 1973 (aged 25)	1996	(Greece) Apollon Athens	₯330,000,000	2001
20	Daniel Batista (Vice-captain 2)	(Greece) (Cape Verde)	ST / SS / AM	9 September 1964 (aged 34)	1995	(Greece) Olympiacos	Free	2000
26	Giorgos Kartalis	(Greece)	ST / SS	2 May 1972 (aged 27)	1996	(Greece) Triglia Rafinas	₯4,000,000	2001
—	Giorgos Kavazis	(Cyprus)	ST	15 January 1980 (aged 19)	1999	(Cyprus) Apollon Limassol	₯40,000,000	2003
Left during Winter Transfer Window
29	Dionysis Chiotis	(Greece)	GK	4 June 1977 (aged 22)	1995	(Greece) AEK Athens U20	—	2005
—	Vangelis Kefalas	(Greece)	CB / DM	31 July 1973 (aged 25)	1997	(Greece) Apollon Athens	Free	2000
—	Mattheos Platakis	(Greece)	AM / ST / SS	30 June 1977 (aged 22)	1996	(Greece) Phinikas Polichini	Free	2000
—	Ilian Iliev	(Bulgaria)	AM	2 July 1968 (aged 30)	1998	(Turkey) Bursaspor	₯300,000,000	1999
—	Georgios Donis	(Greece) (Germany)	RW / RM	22 October 1969 (aged 29)	1997	(England) Blackburn Rovers	Free	2003
—	Ilias Anastasakos	(Greece)	ST / LW / LM	3 March 1978 (aged 21)	1995	(Greece) A.O. Dafniou	Free	2002

== Transfers ==
=== In ===
==== Summer ====
No.	Pos.	Player	From	Fee	Date	Contract Until	Source
2	MF	(Greece) Vasilios Lakis	(Greece) Paniliakos	₯320,000,000	12 June 1998	30 June 2003	
3	MF	(Greece) Dimitris Markos	(Greece) Kalamata	Free transfer	1 July 1998	30 June 2001	
5	DF	(North Macedonia) Boban Babunski	(Japan) Gamba Osaka	₯330,000,000	31 July 1998	30 June 2000	
10	MF	(Bulgaria) Ilian Iliev	(Turkey) Bursaspor	₯300,000,000	31 July 1998	30 June 1999	
14	MF	(Greece) Akis Zikos	(Greece) Skoda Xanthi	₯130,000,000	1 June 1998	30 June 2002	
23	FW	(Greece) Ilias Anastasakos	(Greece) Aris Petroupolis	Loan return	1 July 1998	30 June 2002	
26	FW	(Greece) Giorgos Kartalis	(Greece) Aris Petroupolis	Loan return	1 July 1998	30 June 2001	
—	MF	(Greece) Theodoros Alexis	(Greece) Athinaikos	Loan return	1 July 1998	30 June 2001	

==== Winter ====
No.	Pos.	Player	From	Fee	Date	Contract Until	Source
17	GK	(Greece) Kostas Daditsos	(Greece) AEK Athens U20	Promotion	14 May 1999	30 June 1999	
27	MF	(Federal Republic of Yugoslavia) Branko Milovanović	(Portugal) Vitória de Guimarães	₯200,000,000	29 January 1999	30 June 2002	
32	DF	(Greece) Michalis Kapsis	(Greece) Ethnikos Piraeus	₯80,000,000^{[a]}	4 January 1999	31 December 2003	
—	FW	(Greece) Georgios Trichias	(Greece) Niki Volos	Free transfer	31 January 1999	31 December 2005	
—	FW	(Cyprus) Giorgos Kavazis	(Cyprus) Apollon Limassol	₯40,000,000	5 February 1999	30 June 2003	

=== Out ===
==== Summer ====
No.	Pos.	Player	To	Fee	Date	Source
10	FW	(Greece) Christos Kostis	(Belgium) Anderlecht	End of contract	1 July 1998	
21	FW	(Brazil) Marcelo Veridiano	(Cyprus) APOEL	End of contract	1 July 1998	
29	DF	(Greece) Stelios Manolas	Retired		1 July 1998	
30	DF	(Greece) Georgios Koutoulas	(Greece) PAS Giannina	Contract termination	7 August 1998	
31	FW	(Croatia) Goran Tomić	(Italy) Vicenza	Loan return	1 July 1998	
—	MF	(Greece) Theodoros Alexis	(Greece) Apollon Athens	Contract termination	2 August 1998	

==== Winter ====
No.	Pos.	Player	To	Fee	Date	Source
10	MF	(Bulgaria) Ilian Iliev	(Bulgaria) Levski Sofia	Contract termination	31 December 1998	
17	FW	(Greece) Georgios Donis	(England) Sheffield United	Contract termination	23 March 1999	

=== Loan in ===
==== Summer ====
No.	Pos.	Player	From	Fee	Date	Until	Option to buy	Source
9	FW	(Greece) Paraschos Zouboulis	(Greece) PAOK	Free^{[b]}	3 August 1998	30 June 1999	✓	

==== Winter ====
No.	Pos.	Player	From	Fee	Date	Until	Option to buy	Source
10	FW	(Liberia) Christopher Wreh	(England) Arsenal	Free	4 February 1999	30 June 1999	✓	
23	MF	(Germany) Alberto Méndez	(England) Arsenal	Free	1 February 1999	30 June 1999	✗	
24	DF	(Australia) Alvin Ceccoli	(Australia) Wolves	Free	2 February 1999	30 June 1999	✓	

=== Loan out ===
==== Summer ====
No.	Pos.	Player	To	Fee	Date	Until	Option to buy	Source
2	MF	(Greece) Triantafyllos Macheridis	(Greece) PAOK	₯10,000,000^{[b]}	3 August 1998	30 June 1999	✓	

==== Winter ====
No.	Pos.	Player	To	Fee	Date	Until	Option to buy	Source
24	DF	(Greece) Vangelis Kefalas	(Greece) Kavala	Free	13 January 1999	30 June 1999	✓	
23	FW	(Greece) Ilias Anastasakos	(Greece) Apollon Athens	Free	1 January 1999	31 December 2000	✗	
27	MF	(Greece) Mattheos Platakis	(Greece) Ethnikos Piraeus	Free	11 January 1999	30 June 1999	✓	
29	GK	(Greece) Dionysis Chiotis	(Greece) Ethnikos Piraeus	Free	11 January 1999	30 June 1999	✓	
—	FW	(Greece) Georgios Trichias	(Greece) Panelefsiniakos	Free	31 January 1999	30 June 1999	✗	

Notes

a. plus Chiotis and Platakis as a free loan until the end of the season.

b. exchange of Zouboulis and Machairidis between AEK and PAOK.

=== Contract renewals ===
No.	Pos.	Player	Date	Former Exp. Date	New Exp. Date	Source
1	GK	(Greece) Ilias Atmatsidis	29 January 1999	30 June 1999	30 June 2002	
22	GK	(Greece) Vasilis Karagiannis	1 July 1998	30 June 1998	30 June 1999	
7	MF	(Greece) Christos Maladenis	11 June 1999	30 June 2000	30 June 2003	
8	MF	(North Macedonia) Toni Savevski	22 December 1998	30 June 1999	30 June 2001	
11	FW	(Greece) Demis Nikolaidis	10 July 1998	30 June 1999	30 June 2001	
20	FW	(Greece) Daniel Batista	4 June 1998	30 June 1998	30 June 2000	

=== Overall transfer activity ===
==== Expenditure ====
Summer: ▼ ₯1,080,000,000

Winter: ▼ ₯320,000,000

Total: ▼ ₯1,360,000,000

==== Income ====
Summer: ▲ ₯10,000,000

Winter: ▲ ₯0

Total: ▲ ₯10,000,000

==== Net Totals ====
Summer: ▼ ₯1,070,000,000

Winter: ▼ ₯320,000,000

Total: ▼ ₯1,390,000,000

== Pre-season and friendlies ==
11 July 1998 Friendly	AEK Athens	5–0	Doxa Vyronas	Nea Filadelfeia
21:00 EEST (UTC+3)	Maladenis 20', 36', 72'; Kefalas 39'; Anastasakos 88'	Report		Stadium: Nikos Goumas Stadium; Attendance: 3,000

19 July 1998 Friendly	Tirol Innsbruck	2–2	AEK Athens	Innsbruck
19:30 EEST (UTC+3)	Albach 5'; Sares 14'	Report	Maladenis 27'; Kopitsis 48' (pen.)

25 July 1998 Friendly	VfB Stuttgart	1–2	AEK Athens	Ehingen
16:00 EEST (UTC+3)	Đorđević 25'	Report	Nikolaidis 9'; Donis 89' (pen.)	Stadium: Stadion der Stadt Ehingen; Attendance: 8,000

30 July 1998 Friendly	PAOK	1–0	AEK Athens	Thessaloniki
21:00 EEST (UTC+3)	Katsabis 19'	Report		Stadium: Toumba Stadium; Attendance: 14,727; Referee: Malamas Tevekelis (Thessaloniki)

5 August 1998 Friendly	AEK Athens	4–0	Újpest	Nea Filadelfeia
21:00 EEST (UTC+3)	Nikolaidis 4'; Maladenis 17'; Kopitsis 18' (pen.); Zikos 73'	Report		Stadium: Nikos Goumas Stadium; Attendance: 3,000; Referee: Giorgos Fasolis (Athens)

5 September 1998 Friendly	AEK Athens	3–1	Apollon Athens	Thrakomakedones
17:15 EEST (UTC+3)	Sebwe 3', 44'; Zouboulis 24'	Report	Banjac 80'	Stadium: AEK Athens' Training Complex; Attendance: 200; Referee: Toni Savevski
Note: The referee of the match was Toni Savevski with Akis Zikos and Christos Maladenis as linesmen.

8 October 1998 Friendly	AEK Athens	4–2	Apollon Athens	Thrakomakedones
10:00 EEST (UTC+3)	Katsavos; Anastasakos; Sebwe; Kefalas	Report	Sakelaridis; Alexis	Stadium: AEK Athens' Training Complex; Attendance: Behind closed doors
Note: The match lasted 87 minutes in total (35+35+17 minutes).

16 October 1998 Friendly	AEK Athens	2–2	Panionios	Nea Filadelfeia
16:00 EEST (UTC+3)	Donis 8'; Zouboulis 80'	Report	Karasavvidis 29'; Nalitzis 58'	Stadium: Nikos Goumas Stadium; Attendance: Behind closed doors Referee: Giorgos Kasnaferis (Athens)

3 January 1999 Friendly	AEK Athens	5–0	Kallithea	Nea Filadelfeia
15:00 EET (UTC+2)	Markos 3'; Zouboulis 57'; Platakis 61'; Donis 79'; Nikolaidis 85'	Report		Stadium: Nikos Goumas Stadium; Attendance: 700; Referee: Christoforos Zografos (Athens)

6 January 1999 Friendly	AEK Athens	6–0	Athinaikos	Nea Filadelfeia
15:00 EET (UTC+2)	Sebwe 45', 85'; Nikolaidis 56', 64'; Kefalas 68'; Zouboulis 81'	Report		Stadium: Nikos Goumas Stadium; Referee: Giannis Papapetrou (Athens)

10 January 1999 Friendly	Panelefsiniakos	0–0	AEK Athens	Elefsina
15:00 EET (UTC+2)		Report		Stadium: Municipal Stadium of Elefsina; Attendance: 1,500; Referee: Giorgos Douros (Corinthia)

10 February 1999 Friendly	AEK Athens	1–2	Steaua București	Nea Filadelfeia
19:00 EET (UTC+2)	Passios 67'	Report	Roșu 21' (pen.); Luțu 72'	Stadium: Nikos Goumas Stadium; Attendance: 701; Referee: Dimitris Kalyvas (Boeotia)

27 March 1999 Friendly	AEK Athens	4–0	Egaleo	Thrakomakedones
16:00 EET (UTC+2)	Zouboulis 30'; Sebwe 37', 38'; Karaplangas 65'	Report		Stadium: AEK Athens' Training Complex; Attendance: 100; Referee: Takis Karagiozopoulos

7 April 1999 Charity/Anti-war match	Partizan	1–1	AEK Athens	Belgrade
15:00 EET (UTC+2)	Kežman 13'	Report	Zouboulis 26'	Stadium: Partizan Stadium; Attendance: 15,000; Referee: Elević (Serbia and Montenegro)
Note: The players of Apollon Athens, Nikos Kourkounas and Spyros Chatzis were in the squad AEK of as well, with the first coming in the match as a sub at the 40th minute. The match ended at the 68th minute, due to the fan invasion to embrace the footballers.

== Competitions ==
=== Overall record ===
Competition	First match	Last match	Starting round	Final position	Record							
Competition	First match	Last match	Starting round	Final position	Pld	W	D	L	GF	GA	GD	Win %
Alpha Ethniki	22 August 1998	30 May 1999	Matchday 1	2nd	34	23	6	5	71	27	+44	67.65
Greek Cup	10 November 1998	10 November 1998	First round	First round	1	0	0	1	0	1	−1	0.00
UEFA Cup	11 August 1998	29 September 1998	Second qualifying round	First round	4	1	1	2	9	8	+1	25.00
Total					39	24	7	8	80	36	+44	61.54

Last updated: 30 May 1999
Source: Competitions

=== Alpha Ethniki ===
==== League table ====
Pos	Team	Pld	W	D	L	GF	GA	GD	Pts	Qualification or relegation
1	Olympiacos (C)	34	27	4	3	82	22	+60	85	Qualification for Champions League first group stage
2	AEK Athens	34	23	6	5	71	27	+44	75	Qualification for Champions League third qualifying round
3	Panathinaikos	34	23	5	6	66	36	+30	74	Qualification for UEFA Cup first round
4	PAOK	34	19	5	10	52	31	+21	62	Qualification for UEFA Cup first round
5	Ionikos	34	17	9	8	64	36	+28	60 (Note: Head-to-head record: Aris–Ionikos 1–1, Ionikos–Aris 3–0.)	Qualification for UEFA Cup first round

Source: Galanis Sports Data
Rules for classification: 1st points; 2nd head-to-head points; 3rd head-to-head goal difference; 4th decision match.
(C) Champions

==== Results summary ====
Overall								Home						Away					
Pld	W	D	L	GF	GA	GD	Pts	W	D	L	GF	GA	GD	W	D	L	GF	GA	GD
34	23	6	5	71	27	+44	75	16	1	0	47	9	+38	7	5	5	24	18	+6

Source: Competitive matches

==== Results by Matchday ====
Round	1	2	3	4	5	6	7	8	9	10	11	12	13	14	15	16	17	18	19	20	21	22	23	24	25	26	27	28	29	30	31	32	33	34
Ground	A	H	A	H	A	H	A	H	H	A	H	A	H	A	H	A	A	H	A	H	A	H	A	H	A	A	H	A	H	A	H	A	H	H
Result	W	W	D	W	W	W	D	W	L	W	W	L	W	W	D	L	W	W	D	W	W	W	W	W	W	W	L	L	W	D	W	W	W	D
Position	3	3	5	4	1	1	2	2	3	2	1	2	2	2	2	3	3	3	3	3	2	2	2	2	2	2	2	2	2	2	2	2	2	2

Source: Competitive matches
A = Away; H = Home; W = Win; D = Draw; L = Loss; P = Postponed

==== Matches ====
22 August 1998 1	Panionios	1–3	AEK Athens	Nea Smyrni
21:00 EEST (UTC+3)	Bergersen (yellow card) 29'; Mitsiopoulos (yellow card) 63'; Fyssas (yellow card) 73'; Ioannidis 89'		Kopitsis (yellow card) 55' (yellow-red card) 83', (goal) 82'; Babunski (yellow card) 61'; Savevski 65'; Nikolaidis 70'	Stadium: Nea Smyrni Stadium; Attendance: 5,444; Referee: Malamas Tevekelis (Thessaloniki)

30 August 1998 2	AEK Athens	3–1	Apollon Athens	Nea Filadelfeia
17:30 EEST (UTC+3)	Maladenis 5'; Nikolaidis 43', 82'		Laios 9'; Damigos (yellow card) 31'; Theodorakos (yellow card) 63'; Bwelle (yellow card) 76'; Sakellaridis (yellow card) 86'	Stadium: Nikos Goumas Stadium; Attendance: 10,247; Referee: Pavlos Konstantinidis (Piraeus)

12 September 1998 3	Panelefsiniakos	0–0	AEK Athens	Elefsina
17:00 EEST (UTC+3)	Kalykas (yellow card) 19'; Wanga (yellow card) 41'; Kaklamanos (yellow card) 88' (yellow-red card) 90'; Rantos (yellow card) 89'		Iliev (yellow card) 73'; Zikos (yellow card) 90'; Atmatsidis (yellow card) 90+1'	Stadium: Municipal Stadium of Elefsina; Attendance: 4,500; Referee: Dimitris Kalyvas (Boeotia)

20 September 1998 4	AEK Athens	2–0	Veria	Nea Filadelfeia
17:00 EEST (UTC+3)	Maladenis (yellow card) 36', (goal) 36'; Karagiannis (yellow card) 45'; Nikolaidis 45+3'; Kalitzakis (yellow card) 56'		Stevanović (yellow card) 24'; Fasidis (yellow card) 42'; Tsigiannis (yellow card) 65'	Stadium: Nikos Goumas Stadium; Attendance: 7,878; Referee: Christoforos Zografos (Athens)

25 September 1998 5	OFI	0–1	AEK Athens	Heraklion
21:00 EEST (UTC+3)	Diarra (yellow card) 16'; Mitić (yellow card) 42'; Skentzos (yellow card) 56'		Nikolaidis 21'; Kefalas (yellow card) 23'; Kopitsis (yellow card) 31'; Zikos (yellow card) 52' (yellow-red card) 58'; Markos (yellow card) 74'	Stadium: Theodoros Vardinogiannis Stadium; Attendance: 6,594; Referee: Malamas Tevekelis (Thessaloniki)

4 October 1998 6	AEK Athens	3–1	Paniliakos	Nea Filadelfeia
16:00 EEST (UTC+3)	Zouboulis 5', 44'; Grétarsson (yellow card) 69'; Kalitzakis (yellow card) 90'; Savevski 90+3'; Kopitsis (yellow card) 90+3'		Togias 75'; Charún (yellow card) 78'; Nebegleras (yellow card) 79'	Stadium: Nikos Goumas Stadium; Attendance: 8,291; Referee: Kyros Vassaras (Thessaloniki)

25 October 1998 7	Proodeftiki	1–1	AEK Athens	Nikaia
15:00 EET (UTC+2)	Chouzouris (yellow card) 16'; Zikos 24' (o.g.); Dagas (yellow card) 35' (yellow-red card) 58'; Politis (yellow card) 45+3' (yellow-red card) 83'		Nikolaidis 3', (yellow card) 16'; Zikos (yellow card) 24'; Savevski (yellow card) 66' (yellow-red card) 85'; Babunski (yellow card) 70'	Stadium: Nikaia Municipal Stadium; Attendance: 3,176; Referee: Dimitris Begos (Argolida)

1 November 1998 8	AEK Athens	3–1	Ethnikos Asteras	Nea Filadelfeia
15:00 EET (UTC+2)	Zouboulis 3'; Nikolaidis 40' (pen.), 49'		Dragaš 20'; Basinas (yellow card) 39'	Stadium: Nikos Goumas Stadium; Attendance: 7,515; Referee: Giorgos Fasolis (Athens)

7 November 1998 9	PAOK	2–1	AEK Athens	Thessaloniki
17:00 EET (UTC+2)	Kapetanopoulos (yellow card) 15'; Taccola (yellow card) 55'; Katsabis (yellow card) 61'; Olivares 62' (pen.), 74'		Markos (yellow card) 28' (yellow-red card) 62'; Nikolaidis (yellow card) 38', (goal) 40'; Atmatsidis (yellow card) 44'; Maladenis (yellow card) 55'; Kasapis (yellow card) 89'	Stadium: Toumba Stadium; Attendance: 13,535; Referee: Giorgos Bikas (Chalkidiki)

22 November 1998 10	AEK Athens	2–1	Ionikos	Nea Filadelfeia
17:00 EET (UTC+2)	Maladenis 15', (yellow card) 32'; Kostenoglou 22'; Kasapis (yellow card) 24'; Markos (yellow card) 74'; Nikolaidis (penalty missed) 90+1'		Pachatouridis (yellow card) 23'; Rodríguez (yellow card) 26' (yellow-red card) 90'; Andrioli 33' (pen.); Daraklitsas (yellow card) 45+2'	Stadium: Nikos Goumas Stadium; Attendance: 3,971; Referee: Manolis Giannadakis (Lasithi)

29 November 1998 11	AEK Athens	6–0	Aris	Nea Filadelfeia
17:00 EET (UTC+2)	Katsiaros 4' (o.g.); Kalitzakis (yellow card) 22'; Lakis (yellow card) 30'; Maladenis 33'; Nikolaidis 54', 77', 81'; Savevski 57'; Grétarsson (yellow card) 69'		Flores (yellow card) 51'; Mitsopoulos (yellow card) 61' (yellow-red card) 72'	Stadium: Nikos Goumas Stadium; Attendance: 10,422; Referee: Giannis Abelakias (Thessaly)

6 December 1998 12	Kavala	2–1	AEK Athens	Kavala
16:30 EET (UTC+2)	Nasiopoulos 9'; Digozis (yellow card) 22'; Kavakas (yellow card) 25'; Pisz 54'; Chatzizisis (yellow card) 65'		Markos (yellow card) 8'; Savevski 70'	Stadium: Kavala Municipal Stadium; Attendance: 4,213; Referee: Giorgos Tsangarakis (Chania)

13 December 1998 13	AEK Athens	2–0	Panathinaikos	Nea Filadelfeia
17:15 EET (UTC+2)	Lakis 10'; Zikos (yellow card) 43'; Savevski 60'; Kopitsis (yellow card) 70'; Kalitzakis (yellow card) 79'; Maladenis (yellow card) 88'; Nikolaidis (yellow card) 90+1'		Goumas (yellow card) 34'; Milojević (yellow card) 75'	Stadium: Nikos Goumas Stadium; Attendance: 14,127; Referee: Giorgos Fasolis (Athens)

21 December 1998 14	Ethnikos Piraeus	1–4	AEK Athens	Piraeus
19:30 EET (UTC+2)	Vouzas (yellow card) 2'; Grétarsson 15' (o.g.); Macheras (yellow card) 66'		Kasapis 3'; Batista (yellow card) 10', (goal) 17', 55'; Zikos 44', (yellow card) 59'	Stadium: Karaiskakis Stadium; Attendance: 4,584; Referee: Manolis Giannadakis (Lasithi)

17 January 1999 15	AEK Athens	2–2	Iraklis	Nea Filadelfeia
15:00 EET (UTC+2)	Nikolaidis 26'; Lakis 28'; Babunski (yellow card) 51'; Karagiannis (yellow card) 72'		Semos 43'; Kyriazis (yellow card) 48'; Hagan 62'; Kasimba (yellow card) 65'; Kidoda (yellow card) 67'	Stadium: Nikos Goumas Stadium; Attendance: 10,638; Referee: Nikos Iliadis (Piraeus)

24 January 1999 16	Skoda Xanthi	2–1	AEK Athens	Xanthi
16:45 EET (UTC+2)	Kyparissis 47'; Ba 34'; Vilanakis (yellow card) 78'		Savevski 40'; Kasapis (yellow card) 72'	Stadium: A.O. Xanthi Stadium; Attendance: 4,591; Referee: Nikos Angelakis (Thessaloniki)

31 January 1999 17	AEK Athens	2–0	Olympiacos	Nea Filadelfeia
17:00 EET (UTC+2)	Zikos (yellow card) 2'; Batista 11'; Nikolaidis 45', (yellow card) 45+1'; Karagiannis (yellow card) 57'; Grétarsson (yellow card) 60'		Karapialis (yellow card) 2'; Poursanidis (yellow card) 4'; Georgatos (yellow card) 47'; Anatolakis (yellow card) 59'	Stadium: Nikos Goumas Stadium; Attendance: 19,026; Referee: Malamas Tevekelis (Thessaloniki)

8 February 1999 18	AEK Athens	3–0	Panionios	Nea Filadelfeia
18:30 EET (UTC+2)	Batista 23'; Kostenoglou (yellow card) 54'; Kopitsis (yellow card) 66'; Nikolaidis 68'; Wreh 87'		Bakkerud (yellow card) 11' (yellow-red card) 71'; Ioannidis (yellow card) 26' (yellow-red card) 64'; Strakosha (yellow card) 65'	Stadium: Nikos Goumas Stadium; Attendance: 11,517; Referee: Kleomenis Bontiotis (Athens)

14 February 1999 19	Apollon Athens	1–1	AEK Athens	Rizoupoli
15:00 EET (UTC+2)	Lachanas (yellow card) 14' (yellow-red card) 70'; Labriakos 30', (yellow card) 50'; Ioannou (yellow card) 33' (yellow-red card) 67'; Berchtold (yellow card) 56'		Kalitzakis (yellow card) 19' (yellow-red card) 77'; Maladenis 45+1'; Nikolaidis (yellow card) 72'; Kostenoglou (yellow card) 88'	Stadium: Rizoupoli Stadium; Attendance: 10,129; Referee: Giorgos Tsangarakis (Chania)

21 February 1999 20	AEK Athens	6–2	Panelefsiniakos	Nea Filadelfeia
15:00 EET (UTC+2)	Nikolaidis (penalty missed) 6', 40'; Katsavos (yellow card) 12'; Wreh 31'; Ceccoli 50'; Zikos 57'; Kostenoglou (yellow card) 65'; Markos 85'; Sebwe 90+1'		Roussos (yellow card) 3'; Andreadis 12'; Kalykas (yellow card) 30'; Tsironis (penalty missed) 65'; Zikos 66' (o.g.)	Stadium: Nikos Goumas Stadium; Attendance: 5,303; Referee: Giorgos Fasolis (Athens)

1 March 1999 21	Veria	0–3	AEK Athens	Veria
15:00 EET (UTC+2)	Tsalouchidis (yellow card) 22'; Demirtzoglou (penalty missed) 43'; Stoica (yellow card) 65'		Kopitsis (yellow card) 30'; Kalitzakis (yellow card) 31'; Kostenoglou (yellow card) 42'; Milovanović 45+2'; Nikolaidis 49'; Maladenis 66'	Stadium: Veria Stadium; Attendance: 3,233; Referee: Spyros Papadakos (Laconia)

7 March 1999 22	AEK Athens	2–0	OFI	Nea Filadelfeia
16:00 EET (UTC+2)	Nikolaidis 18', 67' (pen.); Zikos (yellow card) 22'		Papadopoulos (yellow card) 19'; Pavlopoulos (yellow card) 66'	Stadium: Nikos Goumas Stadium; Attendance: 14,662; Referee: Giannis Papapetrou (Athens)

15 March 1999 23	Paniliakos	0–1	AEK Athens	Pyrgos
16:00 EET (UTC+2)	Koltzos (yellow card) 42'; Ferekidis (yellow card) 43'		Kalitzakis (yellow card) 17'; Kopitsis (yellow card) 57'; Savevski 90+4'	Stadium: Pyrgos Stadium; Attendance: 3,512; Referee: Dimitris Kalyvas (Boeotia)

21 March 1999 24	AEK Athens	1–0	Proodeftiki	Nea Filadelfeia
16:00 EET (UTC+2)	Kapsis (yellow card) 64'; Maladenis 67'		Pantelidis (yellow card) 45+1'; Al Zaher (yellow card) 45+3'; Maimanis (yellow card) 51'	Stadium: Nikos Goumas Stadium; Attendance: 10,710; Referee: Christos Daglis (Thessaloniki)

4 April 1999 25	Ethnikos Asteras	2–3	AEK Athens	Kaisariani
17:00 EEST (UTC+3)	Xanthis (yellow card) 36'; Frontzos 56', (yellow card) 57' (yellow-red card) 72'; Tsalikis 58'; Kontopoulos (yellow card) 60'; Stamatoukos (yellow card) 83'		Maladenis 8', 83', (yellow card) 90+5'; Zikos (yellow card) 40'; Nikolaidis 47'; Kostenoglou (yellow card) 61'; Zouboulis (yellow card) 76' (yellow-red card) 88'	Stadium: Michalis Kritikopoulos Stadium; Attendance: 4,000; Referee: Nikos Angelakis (Thessaloniki)

18 April 1999 26	AEK Athens	2–0	PAOK	Nea Filadelfeia
19:30 EEST (UTC+3)	Nikolaidis 45' (pen.); Zikos (yellow card) 51'; Wreh 78'		Kapetanopoulos (yellow card) 38'; Olivares (yellow card) 43'; Frantzeskos (yellow card) 44'; Nagbe (yellow card) 59'	Stadium: Nikos Goumas Stadium; Attendance: 14,139; Referee: Giorgos Bikas (Chalkidiki)

25 April 1999 27	Ionikos	2–1	AEK Athens	Nikaia
17:00 EEST (UTC+3)	Frousos 30', (yellow card) 54'; Ofrydopoulos (yellow card) 59'; Brewster 90+4'		Kalitzakis (yellow card) 49'; Zouboulis 75', (yellow card) 90'	Stadium: Neapoli Stadium; Attendance: 3,524; Referee: Naoum Mintiouris (Serres)

2 May 1999 28	Aris	2–0	AEK Athens	Thessaloniki
19:00 EEST (UTC+3)	Liolidis 12', 27'; Louboutis (yellow card) 45+1'; Koutsis (yellow card) 88' (yellow-red card) 90+1'		Markos (yellow card) 25'; Kopitsis (yellow card) 29'; Kalitzakis (yellow card) 88'; Nikolaidis (penalty missed) 90'; Wreh (yellow card) 90+2'	Stadium: Aris Stadium; Attendance: 10,888; Referee: Giorgos Fasolis (Athens)

9 May 1999 29	AEK Athens	4–0	Kavala	Nea Filadelfeia
17:00 EEST (UTC+3)	Maladenis 20'; Milovanović 29'; Zouboulis 36'; Wreh 82'; Kostenoglou (yellow card) 83'		Enuagwuna (yellow card) 85'	Stadium: Nikos Goumas Stadium; Attendance: 5,799; Referee: Manolis Giannadakis (Lasithi)

12 May 1999 30	Panathinaikos	0–0	AEK Athens	Marousi
19:30 EEST (UTC+3)	Basinas (red card) 25'; Konstantinidis (yellow card) 38'; Kola (yellow card) 83'		Wreh (red card) 25'; Atmatsidis (yellow card) 25'; Kopitsis (yellow card) 26'; Zikos (yellow card) 63'; Nikolaidis (yellow card) 80'; Kasapis (yellow card) 90+4'	Stadium: Olympic Stadium; Attendance: 18,347; Referee: Georgios Psychomanis (Athens)

16 May 1999 31	AEK Athens	2–0	Ethnikos Piraeus	Nea Filadelfeia
17:30 EEST (UTC+3)	Sebwe 4'; Milovanović (yellow card) 49'; Kostenoglou (yellow card) 60'; Zouboulis 89'		Macheras (yellow card) 45+2'; Syrigos (yellow card) 86'	Stadium: Nikos Goumas Stadium; Attendance: 3,663; Referee: Malamas Tevekelis (Thessaloniki)

19 May 1999 32	Iraklis	2–3	AEK Athens	Thessaloniki
18:15 EEST (UTC+3)	Tziortziopoulos (yellow card) 19'; Konstantinou (yellow card) 26'; Kyriazis 48'; Christodoulou 88'		Maladenis 27', 66', 90', (yellow card) 90+1'; Karagiannis (yellow card) 32'; Lakis (yellow card) 43'; Atmatsidis (yellow card) 90+2'	Stadium: Kaftanzoglio Stadium; Attendance: 5,036; Referee: Naoum Mintiouris (Serres)

23 May 1999 33	AEK Athens	2–1	Skoda Xanthi	Nea Filadelfeia
20:00 EEST (UTC+3)	Nikolaidis 41', (yellow card) 73'; Atmatsidis 66' (pen.); Milovanović (yellow card) 90'; Zouboulis (yellow card) 90+2'		Makris 59', (yellow card) 60'; Kartalis (yellow card) 65'; Tsouvalidis (yellow card) 74'	Stadium: Nikos Goumas Stadium; Attendance: 15,004; Referee: Dimitris Pontikis (Thessaloniki)

30 May 1999 34	Olympiacos	0–0	AEK Athens	Piraeus
20:00 EEST (UTC+3)	Anatolakis (yellow card) 19'; Amanatidis (yellow card) 55'; Georgatos (yellow card) 64'; Mavrogenidis (yellow card) 88'		Kalitzakis (yellow card) 15'; Nikolaidis (yellow card) 18'; Katsavos (yellow card) 25' (yellow-red card) 72'; Atmatsidis (yellow card) 90+1'	Stadium: Karaiskakis Stadium; Attendance: 20,333; Referee: Kostas Vallianos (Aetoloacarnania)

=== Greek Cup ===
10 November 1998 First round	Poseidon Michaniona	1–0	AEK Athens	Thessaloniki
14:30 EET (UTC+2)	Tsoraklidis (yellow card); Prittas 35'	Report	Babunski (yellow card); Kalitzakis (yellow card)	Stadium: Poseidon Nea Michaniona Stadium; Attendance: 1,112; Referee: Malamas Tevekelis (Thessaloniki)

=== UEFA Cup ===
==== Second qualifying round ====
11 August 1998 First leg	Ferencváros (Hungary)	4–2	(Greece) AEK Athens	Budapest, Hungary
21:00 EEST (UTC+3)	Selimi 11'; Vámosi (yellow card) 12'; Lendvai 28'; Telek (yellow card) 36'; Nyilas 54'; Vincze 83'; Udvarácz (yellow card) 89'	Report	Kasapis (yellow card) 7'; Maladenis (yellow card) 13'; Kopitsis (yellow card) 25'; Atmatsidis (yellow card) 53'; Nikolaidis 86'; Zikos (yellow card) 88'; Sebwe 88'	Stadium: Stadion Albert Flórián; Attendance: 8,860; Referee: David Elleray (Ireland)

25 August 1998 Second leg	AEK Athens (Greece)	4–0 (6–2 agg.)	(Hungary) Ferencváros	Athens, Greece
21:00 EEST (UTC+3)	Nikolaidis 8', 13' (pen.), 26' (pen.); Zikos (yellow card) 10'; Kalitzakis (yellow card) 40'; Markos (yellow card) 47'; Donis 64'	Report	Vámosi (yellow card) 11'; Udvarácz (yellow card) 13'; Telek (yellow card) 15'; Szűcs (yellow card) 21'; Nyilas (yellow card) 39'	Stadium: Nea Smyrni Stadium; Attendance: 20,000; Referee: Nikolai Levnikov (Russia)

==== First round ====
15 September 1998 First leg	Vitesse (Netherlands)	3–0	(Greece) AEK Athens	Arnhem, Netherlands
19:00 EEST (UTC+3)	Goossen (yellow card) 33'; Machlas (penalty missed) 50, 90'; Laros 50'; Perović 52'	Report	Kasapis (yellow card) 8' (yellow-red card) 71'; Kalitzakis (yellow card) 48'	Stadium: GelreDome; Attendance: 16,000; Referee: Lucílio Batista (Portugal)

29 September 1998 Second leg	AEK Athens (Greece)	3–3 (3–6 agg.)	(Netherlands) Vitesse	Athens, Greece
21:00 EEST (UTC+3)	Kopitsis (yellow card) 4', (goal) 69'; Nikolaidis 14', 75'; Kefalas (yellow card) 32'; Kostenoglou (yellow card) 74'	Report	Machlas 11', 17'; De Marchi (yellow card) 24'; Van der Hoeven (yellow card) 29'; Westerveld (red card) 45+2'; Reuser 51'	Stadium: Nikos Goumas Stadium; Attendance: 20,364; Referee: Pascal Garibian (France)

== Statistics ==
=== Squad statistics ===
As of 30 May 1999

No.	Pos	Player	Alpha Ethniki		Greek Cup		UEFA Cup		Total	
No.	Pos	Player	Apps	Goals	Apps	Goals	Apps	Goals	Apps	Goals
Goalkeepers
1	GK	(Greece) Ilias Atmatsidis	28	1	1	0	3	0	32	1
15	GK	(Greece) Chrysostomos Michailidis	6	0	0	0	1	0	7	0
17	GK	(Greece) Kostas Daditsos	0	0	0	0	0	0	0	0
22	GK	(Greece) Vasilis Karagiannis	1	0	0	0	0	0	1	0
Defenders
5	DF	(North Macedonia) Boban Babunski	8	0	1	0	4	0	13	0
6	DF	(Greece) Nikos Kostenoglou	25	1	0	0	4	0	29	1
12	DF	(Greece) Charis Kopitsis	23	1	1	0	4	1	28	2
13	DF	(Greece) Vaios Karagiannis	7	0	0	0	2	0	9	0
21	DF	(Greece) Michalis Kasapis	26	1	1	0	3	0	30	1
24	DF	(Australia) Alvin Ceccoli	4	1	0	0	0	0	4	1
25	DF	(Greece) Giannis Kalitzakis	25	0	1	0	3	0	29	0
31	DF	(Romania) Anton Doboș	0	0	0	0	0	0	0	0
32	DF	(Greece) Michalis Kapsis	15	0	0	0	0	0	15	0
Midfielders
2	MF	(Greece) Vasilios Lakis	24	2	1	0	4	0	29	2
3	MF	(Greece) Dimitris Markos	30	1	0	0	4	0	34	1
7	MF	(Greece) Christos Maladenis	25	13	1	0	4	0	30	13
8	MF	(North Macedonia) Toni Savevski	25	7	1	0	3	0	29	7
14	MF	(Greece) Akis Zikos	26	2	1	0	3	0	30	2
16	MF	(Iceland) Arnar Grétarsson	26	0	0	0	3	0	29	0
18	MF	(Greece) Evripidis Katsavos	10	0	1	0	0	0	11	0
19	MF	(Liberia) Kelvin Sebwe	13	2	1	0	2	1	16	3
23	MF	(Germany) Alberto Méndez	11	0	0	0	0	0	11	0
27	MF	(Federal Republic of Yugoslavia) Branko Milovanović	14	2	0	0	0	0	14	2
28	MF	(Greece) Giorgos Passios	3	0	0	0	0	0	3	0
Forwards
9	FW	(Greece) Paris Zouboulis	17	6	0	0	0	0	17	6
10	FW	(Liberia) Christopher Wreh	11	4	0	0	0	0	11	4
11	FW	(Greece) Demis Nikolaidis	29	22	0	0	4	6	33	28
20	FW	(Greece) Daniel Batista	12	4	0	0	0	0	12	4
26	FW	(Greece) Giorgos Kartalis	0	0	0	0	0	0	0	0
—	FW	(Cyprus) Giorgos Kavazis	0	0	0	0	0	0	0	0
Left during Winter Transfer Window
29	GK	(Greece) Dionysis Chiotis	0	0	0	0	1	0	1	0
—	DF	(Greece) Vangelis Kefalas	8	0	1	0	1	0	10	0
—	MF	(Greece) Mattheos Platakis	0	0	0	0	0	0	0	0
—	MF	(Bulgaria) Ilian Iliev	8	0	1	0	2	0	11	0
—	FW	(Greece) Georgios Donis	13	0	1	0	2	1	16	1
—	FW	(Greece) Ilias Anastasakos	0	0	0	0	0	0	0	0

=== Goalscorers ===
As of 30 May 1999
The list is sorted by competition order when total goals are equal, then by position and then by squad number.

Rank	No.	Pos.	Player	Alpha Ethniki	Greek Cup	UEFA Cup	Total
1	11	FW	(Greece) Demis Nikolaidis	22	0	6	28
2	7	MF	(Greece) Christos Maladenis	13	0	0	13
3	8	MF	(North Macedonia) Toni Savevski	7	0	0	7
3	9	FW	(Greece) Paraschos Zouboulis	6	0	0	6
5	10	FW	(Liberia) Christopher Wreh	4	0	0	4
5	20	FW	(Greece) Daniel Batista	4	0	0	4
7	30	MF	(Liberia) Kelvin Sebwe	2	0	1	3
8	14	MF	(Greece) Akis Zikos	2	0	0	2
8	2	MF	(Greece) Vasilios Lakis	2	0	0	2
8	27	MF	(Federal Republic of Yugoslavia) Branko Milovanović	2	0	0	2
8	12	DF	(Greece) Charis Kopitsis	1	0	1	2
12	1	GK	(Greece) Ilias Atmatsidis	1	0	0	1
12	6	DF	(Greece) Nikos Kostenoglou	1	0	0	1
12	17	DF	(Greece) Michalis Kasapis	1	0	0	1
12	3	MF	(Greece) Dimitris Markos	1	0	0	1
12	—	FW	(Greece) Georgios Donis	0	0	1	1
Own goals				1	0	0	1
Totals				70	0	9	79

=== Hat-tricks ===
Numbers in superscript represent the goals that the player scored.

Player	Against	Result	Date	Competition	Source
(Greece) Demis Nikolaidis	(Hungary) Ferencváros	4–0 (H)	25 August 1998	UEFA Cup	
(Greece) Demis Nikolaidis	(Greece) Aris	6–0 (H)	29 November 1998	Alpha Ethniki	
(Greece) Christos Maladenis	(Greece) Iraklis	3–2 (A)	19 May 1999	Alpha Ethniki	

=== Assists ===
As of 30 May 1999
The list is sorted by competition order when total assists are equal, then by position and then by squad number.

Rank	No.	Pos.	Player	Alpha Ethniki	Greek Cup	UEFA Cup	Total
1	3	MF	(Greece) Dimitris Markos	8	0	2	10
2	8	MF	(North Macedonia) Toni Savevski	8	0	1	9
3	11	FW	(Greece) Demis Nikolaidis	6	0	1	7
4	14	MF	(Greece) Akis Zikos	5	0	1	6
5	17	DF	(Greece) Michalis Kasapis	5	0	0	5
6	20	FW	(Greece) Daniel Batista	4	0	0	4
7	7	MF	(Greece) Christos Maladenis	2	0	1	3
8	12	DF	(Greece) Charis Kopitsis	2	0	0	2
8	16	MF	(Iceland) Arnar Grétarsson	2	0	0	2
8	23	MF	(Germany) Alberto Méndez	2	0	0	2
8	27	MF	(Federal Republic of Yugoslavia) Branko Milovanović	2	0	0	2
8	25	DF	(Greece) Giannis Kalitzakis	1	0	1	2
13	2	MF	(Greece) Vasilios Lakis	1	0	0	1
13	30	MF	(Liberia) Kelvin Sebwe	1	0	0	1
13	10	FW	(Liberia) Christopher Wreh	1	0	0	1
Totals				50	0	7	57

=== Clean sheets ===
As of 30 May 1999
The list is sorted by competition order when total clean sheets are equal and then by squad number. Clean sheets in games where both goalkeepers participated are awarded to the goalkeeper who started the game. Goalkeepers with no appearances are not included.

Rank	No.	Player	Alpha Ethniki	Greek Cup	UEFA Cup	Total
1	1	(Greece) Ilias Atmatsidis	13	0	1	14
2	15	(Greece) Chrysostomos Michailidis	3	0	0	3
3	22	(Greece) Vasilis Karagiannis	0	0	0	0
Totals			16	0	1	17

=== Disciplinary record ===
As of 30 May 1999

N	P	Nat.	Name	Alpha Ethniki			Greek Cup			UEFA Cup			Total			Notes
N	P	Nat.	Name	Yellow card	Second yellow card	Red card	Yellow card	Second yellow card	Red card	Yellow card	Second yellow card	Red card	Yellow card	Second yellow card	Red card	Notes
Goalkeepers
1	GK	(Greece)	Ilias Atmatsidis	5						1			6			
15	GK	(Greece)	Chrysostomos Michailidis													
17	GK	(Greece)	Kostas Daditsos													
22	GK	(Greece)	Vasilis Karagiannis													
Defenders
5	DF	(North Macedonia)	Boban Babunski	3			1						4			
6	DF	(Greece)	Nikos Kostenoglou	7						1			8			
12	DF	(Greece)	Charis Kopitsis	10	1					2			12	1		
13	DF	(Greece)	Vaios Karagiannis	4									4			
21	DF	(Greece)	Michalis Kasapis	4						2	1		6	1		
24	DF	(Australia)	Alvin Ceccoli													
25	DF	(Greece)	Giannis Kalitzakis	10	1		1			2			13	1		
31	DF	(Romania)	Anton Doboș													
32	DF	(Greece)	Michalis Kapsis	1									1			
Midfielders
2	MF	(Greece)	Vasilios Lakis	2									2			
3	MF	(Greece)	Dimitris Markos	5	1					1			6	1		
7	MF	(Greece)	Christos Maladenis	6						1			7			
8	MF	(North Macedonia)	Toni Savevski	1	1								1	1		
14	MF	(Greece)	Akis Zikos	10	1					2			12	1		
16	MF	(Iceland)	Arnar Grétarsson	3									3			
18	MF	(Greece)	Evripidis Katsavos	2	1								2	1		
19	MF	(Liberia)	Kelvin Sebwe													
23	MF	(Germany)	Alberto Méndez													
27	MF	(Federal Republic of Yugoslavia)	Branko Milovanović	2									2			
28	MF	(Greece)	Giorgos Passios													
Forwards
9	FW	(Greece)	Paris Zouboulis	3	1								3	1		
10	FW	(Liberia)	Christopher Wreh	1		1							1		1	
11	FW	(Greece)	Demis Nikolaidis	8									8			
20	FW	(Greece)	Daniel Batista	1									1			
26	FW	(Greece)	Giorgos Kartalis													
—	FW	(Cyprus)	Giorgos Kavazis													
Left during Winter Transfer window
29	GK	(Greece)	Dionysis Chiotis													
—	DF	(Greece)	Vangelis Kefalas	1						1			2			
—	MF	(Greece)	Mattheos Platakis													
—	MF	(Bulgaria)	Ilian Iliev	1									1			
—	FW	(Greece)	Georgios Donis													
—	FW	(Greece)	Ilias Anastasakos													

=== Starting 11 ===
This section presents the most frequently used formation along with the players with the most starts across all competitions.

N.	Formation	Matchday(s)
24	4–4–2	8–34
11	3–5–2	1–7
4	4–3–3	8–10

No.	Nat.	Player	Pos.
1	(Greece)	Ilias Atmatsidis	GK
6	(Greece)	Nikos Kostenoglou	RCB
25	(Greece)	Giannis Kalitzakis	LCB
12	(Greece)	Charis Kopitsis	RB
17	(Greece)	Michalis Kasapis	LB
14	(Greece)	Akis Zikos	DM
3	(Greece)	Dimitris Markos	CM
2	(Greece)	Vasilios Lakis	RM
8	(North Macedonia)	Toni Savevski	LM
7	(Greece)	Christos Maladenis	SS
11	(Greece)	Demis Nikolaidis (C)	CF

Last updated: 1999-05-30

== Awards ==
Player	Pos.	Award	Source
(Greece) Demis Nikolaidis	FW	Alpha Ethiniki Top Scorer	
(Greece) Ilias Atmatsidis	GK	Goalkeeper of the Season	
