= 1997–98 Greek Football Cup =

1997–98 Greek Cup
Tournament details
- Country: Greece
- Teams: 66

Final positions
- Champions: Panionios (2nd title)
- Runners-up: Panathinaikos

Tournament statistics
- Matches played: 129
- Goals scored: 328 (2.54 per match)
- Top goal scorer(s): Ademar Dorneles Rodrigues (7 goals)

The 1997–98 Greek Football Cup was the 56th edition of the Greek Football Cup.

== Tournament details ==
Totally 66 teams participated, 18 from Alpha Ethniki, 18 from Beta, and 30 from Gamma. It was held in 7 rounds, including the final. The teams of Alpha Ethniki would enter in the competition in the round of 32.

Panionios made the surprise overcoming Panathinaikos in the final and won the second Cup in their history, after 1979. They were also newly-promoted in first division of that year, since in the previous season they had competed in second division. In semi-finals they eliminated PAOK. Panathinaikos in the round of 16 eliminated Panserraikos, achieving an impressive victory in Serres, with extraordinary 4–6, and while in half time they were behind in the score, 3–1.

== Calendar ==
Round	Date(s)	Fixtures	Clubs	New entries	Leagues entering
First Round	17, 24 August 1997	48	66 → 42	48	Beta Ethniki & Gamma Ethniki
Second Round	10, 24, 25 September 1997	20	42 → 32	none	none
Round of 32	19 November & 3, 4, 24 December 1997	32	32 → 16	18	Alpha Ethniki
Round of 16	7–9, 28, 29 January 1998	16	16 → 8	none	none
Quarter-finals	11, 25 February 1998	8	8 → 4	none	none
Semi-finals	4, 18 March 1998	4	4 → 2	none	none
Final	29 April 1998	1	2 → 1	none	none

== Knockout phase ==
Each tie in the knockout phase, apart from the final, was played over two legs, with each team playing one leg at home. The team that scored more goals on aggregate over the two legs advanced to the next round. If the aggregate score was level, the away goals rule was applied, i.e. the team that scored more goals away from home over the two legs advanced. If away goals were also equal, then extra time was played. The away goals rule was again applied after extra time, i.e. if there were goals scored during extra time and the aggregate score was still level, the visiting team advanced by virtue of more away goals scored. If no goals were scored during extra time, the winners were decided by a penalty shoot-out. In the final, which were played as a single match, if the score was level at the end of normal time, extra time was played, followed by a penalty shoot-out if the score was still level.
The mechanism of the draws for each round is as follows:

- There are no seedings, and teams from the same group can be drawn against each other.

== First round ==
=== Summary ===
Team 1	Agg.	Team 2	1st leg	2nd leg
Edessaikos	4–1	Preveza	2–0	2–1
Marko	4–0	Doxa Drama	4–0	0–0
Tyrnavos	1–5	Orestis Orestiada	0–3	1–2
Ethnikos Asteras	5–3	Panegialios	3–1	2–2
Apollon Kalamarias	2–0	Pamisos Messini	2–0	0–0
Trikala	1–3	ILTEX Lykoi	0–2	1–1
Agios Nikolaos	6–7	Panserraikos	5–2	1–5
Agrotikos Asteras	4–3	Kozani	4–1	0–2
Kallithea	2–3	Nafpaktiakos Asteras	2–1	0–2
Apollon Larissa	1–0	PAS Giannina	1–0	0–0
Panargiakos	1–2	Agia Eleousa	1–1	0–1
Orfeas Alexandroupoli	2–1	Keratsini	0–0	2–1
Panelefsiniakos	6–1	Korinthos	5–0	1–1
Kerkyra	3–1	Olympiacos Volos	3–0	0–1
Naoussa	1–5	Aetos Skydra	0–2	1–3
Pyrgos	0–5	Panetolikos	0–4	0–1
Ialysos	5–1	AEL	2–0	3–1
Anagennisi Arta	0–5	Aris	0–0	0–5
Egaleo	2–1	Ambelokipoi Thessaloniki	2–1	0–0
EAR	1–2	Pierikos	1–1	0–1
Niki Volos	2–0	Levadiakos	2–0	0–0
Ergotelis	4–2	Kastoria	3–2	1–0
Anagennisi Karditsa	5–2	Doxa Vyronas	3–0	2–2
Poseidon Michaniona	3–2	Aiolikos	0–1	3–1

=== Matches ===
17 August 1997
13:00 EEST

Edessaikos	2–0	Preveza
Marcelo 53'; Samolis 65'	Report (page 8)

Municipal Stadium of Edessa, Edessa
24 August 1997
13:00 EEST

Preveza	1–2	Edessaikos
Christodoulou 29'	Report (page 9)	Kryos 17'; Moreira 70'

Athanasia Tsoumeleka Municipal Stadium, Preveza

Edessaikos won 4–1 on aggregate.

17 August 1997
13:00 EEST

Marko	4–0	Doxa Drama
Tavlaridis 65' (o.g.); Kavalieris 75'; Mastrantonis 82'; Dalis 85'	Report (page 9)

Municipal Stadium of Markopoulo, Markopoulo
24 August 1997
13:00 EEST

Doxa Drama	0–0	Marko
	Report (page 10)

Doxa Drama Stadium, Drama

Marko won 4–0 on aggregate.

17 August 1997
13:00 EEST

Tyrnavos	0–3	Orestis Orestiada
	Report (page 9)	Lampidis 3'; Athanasiadis 36'; Chatzisavvas 50'

Tyrnavos Stadium, Tyrnavos
24 August 1997
13:00 EEST

Orestis Orestiada	2–1	Tyrnavos
Athanasiadis 5'; Lampidis 20'	Report (page 10)	Gatas 50'

Orestiada Municipal Stadium, Orestiada

Orestis Orestiada won 5–1 on aggregate.

17 August 1997
13:00 EEST

Ethnikos Asteras	3–1	Panegialios
Gitsis 24'; Jakovlević 43'; Kousanas 86'	Report (page 9)	Stamtoukos 57' (o.g.)

Michalis Kritikopoulos Stadium, Kaisariani
24 August 1997
13:00 EEST

Panegialios	2–2	Ethnikos Asteras
Smyrnis 53'; Dermitzakis 60'	Report (page 10)	Kousanas 37'; Jakovlević 82'

Aigio National Stadium, Aigio

Ethnikos Asteras won 5–3 on aggregate.

17 August 1997
13:00 EEST

Apollon Kalamarias	2–0	Pamisos Messini
Baltidis 34', 39'	Report (page 9)

Kalamaria Stadium, Thessaloniki
24 August 1997
13:00 EEST

Pamisos Messini	0–0	Apollon Kalamarias
	Report (page 10)

Messini Ground, Messini

Apollon Kalamarias won 2–0 on aggregate.

17 August 1997
13:00 EEST

Trikala	0–2	ILTEX Lykoi
	Report (page 9)	Maksimović 8'; Dosis 38'

Trikala Municipal Stadium, Trikala
24 August 1997
13:00 EEST

ILTEX Lykoi	1–1	Trikala
Maksimović 71'	Report (page 10)	Iordanidis 51'

Stelios Iliadis Stadium, Thessaloniki

ILTEX Lykoi won 3–1 on aggregate.

17 August 1997
13:00 EEST

Agios Nikolaos	5–2	Panserraikos
Angelakis 1'; Koça 7', 21'; Karvelas 37'; Minas 46'	Report (page 9)	Jovanović 53'; Antonas 59'

Agios Nikolaos Municipal Stadium, Agios Nikolaos
24 August 1997
13:00 EEST

Panserraikos	5–1	Agios Nikolaos
Ademar 19', 26', 28', 58'; Valvis 39'	Report (page 10)	Angelakis 14'

Serres Municipal Stadium, Serres

Panserraikos won 7–6 on aggregate.

17 August 1997
13:00 EEST

Agrotikos Asteras	4–1	Kozani
Karamanlis 16', 36', 82'; Katsaros 38'	Report (page 9)	Giouropoulos 64'

Agrotikos Asteras Stadium, Thessaloniki
24 August 1997
13:00 EEST

Kozani	2–0	Agrotikos Asteras
Kouzas 80'; Tsobanopoulos 89'	Report (page 10)

Kozani Stadium, Kozani

Kozani won 4–3 on aggregate.

17 August 1997
13:00 EEST

Kallithea	2–1	Nafpaktiakos Asteras
Korobokis 10'; S. Papadimitriou 56'	Report (page 9)	K. Loukopoulos 40'

Grigoris Lamprakis Stadium, Kallithea
24 August 1997
13:00 EEST

Nafpaktiakos Asteras	2–0	Kallithea
G. Loukopoulos 23'; K. Loukopoulos 65'	Report (page 10)

Papacharalambeio Ethniko Stadio, Nafpaktos

Nafpaktiakos Asteras won 3–2 on aggregate.

17 August 1997
13:00 EEST

Apollon Larissa	1–0	PAS Giannina
Tolias 14'	Report (page 8)

Philippoupoli Ground, Larissa
24 August 1997
13:00 EEST

PAS Giannina	0–0	Apollon Larissa
	Report (page 9)

Nikos Kazantzakis Stadium, Heraklion

Apollon Larissa won 1–0 on aggregate.

17 August 1997
13:00 EEST

Panargiakos	1–1	Agia Eleousa
Da Silva 29'	Report (page 9)	Karagiannidis 55'

Argos Municipal Stadium, Argos
24 August 1997
13:00 EEST

Agia Eleousa	1–0	Panargiakos
Liapis 15'	Report (page 10)

Stavros Mavrothalassitis Stadium, Aigaleo

Agia Eleousa won 2–1 on aggregate.

17 August 1997
13:00 EEST

Orfeas Alexandroupoli	0–0	Keratsini
	Report (page 9)

Fotis Kosmas Stadium, Alexandroupoli
24 August 1997
13:00 EEST

Keratsini	1–2	Orfeas Alexandroupoli
Panagopoulos 47'	Report (page 10)	Bogiannis 17'; Oustabasidis 47'

Panagiotis Salpeas Stadium, Keratsini

Orfeas Alexandroupoli won 2–1 on aggregate.

17 August 1997
13:00 EEST

Panelefsiniakos	5–0	Korinthos
Honi 28'; Tsioungaris 65' (o.g.); Papanikolaou 76'; Tzivelekis 88', 89'	Report (page 9)

Municipal Stadium of Elefsina, Elefsina
24 August 1997
13:00 EEST

Korinthos	1–1	Panelefsiniakos
Stylos 88'	Report (page 10)	Djurdjev 47'

Korinthos Stadium, Corinth

Panelefsiniakos won 6–1 on aggregate.

17 August 1997
13:00 EEST

Kerkyra	3–0	Olympiacos Volos
	Report (page 9)	Tasigiannakis 1'; Robotkis 35'; Avramiotis 72'

Kerkyra Stadium, Corfu
24 August 1997
13:00 EEST

Olympiacos Volos	1–0	Kerkyra
Pachatouridis 85'	Report (page 10)

Volos Municipal Stadium, Volos

Kerkyra won 3–1 on aggregate.

17 August 1997
13:00 EEST

Naoussa	0–2	Aetos Skydra
	Report (page 8)	Dimitriou 6', 12'

Municipal Stadium of Naousa, Naousa
24 August 1997
13:00 EEST

Aetos Skydra	3–1	Naoussa
Mitrović 7', 20'; Paschalis 84'	Report (page 9)	Grossis 49'

Skydra Municipal Ground, Skydra

Aetos Skydra won 5–1 on aggregate.

17 August 1997
13:00 EEST

Pyrgos	0–4	Panetolikos
	Report (page 9)	Segos 20'; Zacharopoulos 50'; Konstantopoulos 86'; Papachristos 8p'

Pyrgos Stadium, Pyrgos
24 August 1997
13:00 EEST

Panetolikos	1–0	Pyrgos
Zacharopoulos 17'	Report (page 10)

Panetolikos Stadium, Agrinio

Panetolikos won 5–0 on aggregate.

17 August 1997
13:00 EEST

Ialysos	2–0	AEL
Kypriotis 64'; Samaras 66'	Report (page 9)

Municipal Stadium Ekonomideio, Ialysos
24 August 1997
13:00 EEST

AEL	1–3	Ialysos
Valkanis 5'	Report (page 10)	Petrakis 52'; Pargianas 77'; Samaras 79'

Alcazar Stadium, Larissa

Ialysos won 5–1 on aggregate.

17 August 1997
13:00 EEST

Anagennisi Arta	0–0	Aris
	Report (page 9)

Arta Stadium, Arta
24 August 1997
13:00 EEST

Aris	5–0	Anagennisi Arta
Koltsidas 7'; Strantzalis 18'; Mirtsekis 28', 45'; Liolidis 85'	Report (page 10)

Aris Stadium, Thessaloniki

Aris won 5–0 on aggregate.

17 August 1997
13:00 EEST

Egaleo	2–1	Ambelokipoi Thessaloniki
Sourlis 70'; Vasios 79'	Report (page 9)	Dartzalis 52'

Stavros Mavrothalassitis Stadium, Aigaleo
24 August 1997
13:00 EEST

Ambelokipoi Thessaloniki	0–0	Egaleo
	Report (page 10)

Ambelokipoi Municipal Stadium, Thessaloniki

Egaleo won 2–1 on aggregate.

17 August 1997
13:00 EEST

EAR	1–1	Pierikos
Savicević 37'	Report (page 9)	Tsoplis 69'

Sochora Stadium, Rethymno
24 August 1997
13:00 EEST

Pierikos	1–0	EAR
Tsigas 65'	Report (page 10)

Katerini Stadium, Katerini

Pierikos won 2–1 on aggregate.

17 August 1997
13:00 EEST

Niki Volos	2–0	Levadiakos
Giannakidis 30', 55'	Report (page 9)

Panthessaliko Stadium, Volos
24 August 1997
13:00 EEST

Levadiakos	0–0	Niki Volos
	Report (page 10)

Levadia Municipal Stadium, Livadeia

Niki Volos won 2–0 on aggregate.

17 August 1997
13:00 EEST

Anagennisi Karditsa	3–0	Doxa Vyronas
Vujović 1'; Eyidi 10'; Moschos 22'	Report (page 9)

Municipal Stadium of Karditsa, Karditsa
24 August 1997
13:00 EEST

Doxa Vyronas	2–2	Anagennisi Karditsa
Tsioukas 60'; Theodoridis 62'	Report (page 10)	Moschos 28'; Eyidi 37'

Vyronas National Stadium, Vyronas

Anagennisi Karditsa won 5–2 on aggregate.

17 August 1997
13:00 EEST

Ergotelis	3–2	Kastoria
Lekkakis 38'; Daousianis 50'; Voskakis 55'	Report (page 9)	Kalabokas 7'; Gatopoulos 19'

Nikos Kazantzakis Stadium, Heraklion
24 August 1997
13:00 EEST

Kastoria	0–1	Ergotelis
	Report (page 10)	Chatzakis 30'

Municipal Stadium of Kastoria, Kastoria

Ergotelis won 4–2 on aggregate.

17 August 1997
13:00 EEST

Poseidon Michaniona	0–1	Aiolikos
	Report (page 9)	Gavalas 55'

Poseidon Nea Michaniona Stadium, Thessaloniki
24 August 1997
13:00 EEST

Aiolikos	1–3	Poseidon Michaniona
Dandoulas 12'	Report (page 10)	Manavidis 26'; Tsoraklidis 43'; Kotsiopoulos 69'

Mytilene Municipal Stadium, Mytilene

Poseidon Michaniona won 3–2 on aggregate.

== Second round ==
=== Summary ===
Team 1	Agg.	Team 2	1st leg	2nd leg
Aris	4–1	Aetos Skydra	4–0	0–1
Agia Eleousa	2–3	Edessaikos	2–1	0–2
Poseidon Michaniona	3–3 (4–3 p)	Orestis Orestiada	2–1	1–2 (a.e.t.)
Ergotelis	2–3	Apollon Larissa	1–1	1–2
Pierikos	2–5	Panserraikos	1–2	1–3
Orfeas Alexandroupoli	1–1 (3–0 p)	Nafpaktiakos Asteras	1–0	0–1 (a.e.t.)
Ethnikos Asteras	0–5	Apollon Kalamarias	0–2	0–3
Panelefsiniakos	2–1	ILTEX Lykoi	2–1	0–0
Panetolikos	4–2	Marko	1–1	3–1
Niki Volos	2–0	Kerkyra	1–0	1–0
Egaleo	bye			
Ialysos	bye			
Anagennisi Karditsa	bye			
Agrotikos Asteras	bye			

=== Matches ===
11 September 1997
13:00 EEST

Aris	4–0	Aetos Skydra
Strantzalis 39'; Mirtsekis 59'; Edinho 60', 86'	Report (page 11)

Aris Stadium, Thessaloniki
24 September 1997
13:00 EEST

Aetos Skydra	1–0	Aris
Dimitriou 5'	Report (page 11)

Skydra Municipal Ground, Skydra

Aris won 4–1 on aggregate.

10 September 1997
13:00 EEST

Agia Eleousa	2–1	Edessaikos
Xhukani 66', 90'	Report (page 10)	Pedrinho 22'

Stavros Mavrothalassitis Stadium, Aigaleo
24 September 1997
13:00 EEST

Edessaikos	2–0	Agia Eleousa
Marcelo 53'; Tsamfiloglou 65'	Report (page 11)

Municipal Stadium of Edessa, Edessa

Edessaikos won 3–2 on aggregate.

10 September 1997
13:00 EEST

Poseidon Michaniona	2–1	Orestis Orestiada
Grossis 54'; Gioukoudis 69'	Report (page 10)	Kakoglou 49'

Poseidon Nea Michaniona Stadium, Thessaloniki
24 September 1997
13:00 EEST

Orestis Orestiada	2–1 (a.e.t.)	Poseidon Michaniona
Iliou 56'; Kostoglou 78'	Report (page 11)	Moustakas 90+4'
Penalties
	4–3

Orestiada Municipal Stadium, Orestiada

Orestis Orestiada won 4–3 on penalties.

10 September 1997
13:00 EEST

Ergotelis	1–1	Apollon Larissa
Daousianis 81'	Report (page 10)	Mangos 86'

Nikos Kazantzakis Stadium, Heraklion
25 September 1997
13:00 EEST

Apollon Larissa	2–1	Ergotelis
Kotsios 40'; Kakagiannis 90+1'	Report (page 11)	Koutsakis 50'

Philippoupoli Ground, Larissa

Apollon Larissa won 3–2 on aggregate.

10 September 1997
13:00 EEST

Pierikos	1–2	Panserraikos
Chatzirizos 89'	Report (page 11)	Ademar 44'; Plitsis 74'

Katerini Stadium, Katerini
24 September 1997
13:00 EEST

Panserraikos	3–1	Pierikos
Jovanović 28'; Argyriou 77'; Ademar 84'	Report (page 11)	Tsoplis 18'

Serres Municipal Stadium, Serres

Panserraikos won 5–2 on aggregate.

10 September 1997
13:00 EEST

Orfeas Alexandroupoli	1–0	Nafpaktiakos Asteras
Karypidis 40'	Report (page 10)

Fotis Kosmas Stadium, Alexandroupoli
24 September 1997
13:00 EEST

Nafpaktiakos Asteras	1–0 (a.e.t.)	Orfeas Alexandroupoli
G. Papadopoulos 47'	Report (page 11)
Penalties
	0–3

Papacharalambeio Ethniko Stadio, Nafpaktos

Orfeas Alexandroupoli won 3–0 on penalties.

10 September 1997
13:00 EEST

Ethnikos Asteras	0–2	Apollon Kalamarias
	Report (page 11)	Donković 89'; Petrović 90'

Michalis Kritikopoulos Stadium, Kaisariani
24 September 1997
13:00 EEST

Apollon Kalamarias	3–0	Ethnikos Asteras
Antić 30'; Stratilatis 58'; Grigoriadis 83'	Report (page 11)

Kalamaria Stadium, Thessaloniki

Apollon Kalamarias won 5–0 on aggregate.

10 September 1997
13:00 EEST

Panelefsiniakos	2–1	ILTEX Lykoi
Tzivelekis 13'; Papanikolaou 27'	Report (page 11)	Maksimović 84'

Municipal Stadium of Elefsina, Elefsina
24 September 1997
13:00 EEST

ILTEX Lykoi	0–0	Panelefsiniakos
	Report (page 11)

Stelios Iliadis Stadium, Thessaloniki

Panelefsiniakos won 2–1 on aggregate.

10 September 1997
13:00 EEST

Panetolikos	1–1	Marko
Comar 38'	Report (page 10)	Peppas 67'

Panetolikos Stadium, Agrinio
24 September 1997
13:00 EEST

Marko	1–3	Panetolikos
Gantzoudis 88'	Report (page 11)	Zacharopoulos 83'; Tsifoutis 87', 90+3'

Municipal Stadium of Markopoulo, Markopoulo

Panetolikos won 3–1 on aggregate.

10 September 1997
13:00 EEST

Niki Volos	1–0	Kerkyra
Paflias 57'	Report (page 11)

Panthessaliko Stadium, Volos
24 September 1997
13:00 EEST

Kerkyra	0–1	Niki Volos
	Report (page 11)	Castro 70'

Kerkyra Stadium, Corfu

Niki Volos won 2–0 on aggregate.

== Bracket ==
Round of 32
Apollon Athens	0	0	0
Orfeas Alexandroupoli	2	0	2
Panelefsiniakos	3	0	3
Panionios	1	3	4
Egaleo (a)	1	1	2
Paniliakos	0	2	2
Apollon Kalamarias	3	2	5
Kavala	0	3	3
PAOK	3	0	3
Proodeftiki	1	1	2
Ethnikos Piraeus	0	0	0
Ionikos	0	3	3
Veria	0	3	3
Panetolikos	0	2	2
Skoda Xanthi	2	2	4
AEK Athens	1	0	1
Iraklis	2	2	4
Olympiacos	0	2	2
Edessaikos	1	2	3
Athinaikos	0	2	2
Apollon Larissa (a)	1	1	3
Panachaiki	0	2	3
Agrotikos Asteras	1	1	2
Anagennisi Karditsa	0	3	3
OFI	1	1	2
Kalamata	0	0	0
Aris (a)	2	1	3
Ialysos	0	3	3
Orestis Orestiada	0	0	0
Panathinaikos	2	4	6
Panserraikos	2	2	4
Niki Volos	1	2	3

Round of 16
Orfeas Alexandroupoli	0	0	0
Panionios	0	1	1
Egaleo	0	1	1
Apollon Kalamarias	0	5	5
PAOK	2	2	4
Ionikos	0	1	1
Veria	2	1	3
Skoda Xanthi	1	3	4
Iraklis	5	1	6
Edessaikos	0	3	3
Apollon Larissa	3	1	4
Anagennisi Karditsa	0	0	0
OFI	2	1	3
Aris	1	4	5
Panathinaikos	4	6	10
Panserraikos	1	4	5

Quarter-finals
Panionios	4	2	6
Apollon Kalamarias	2	0	2
PAOK	2	0	2
Skoda Xanthi	0	1	1
Iraklis	4	0	4
Apollon Larissa	0	1	1
Aris	1	0	1
Panathinaikos	1	2	3

Semi-finals
Panionios	1	1	2
PAOK	0	1	1
Iraklis	2	0	2
Panathinaikos	1	3	4

Final
Panionios	1
Panathinaikos	0

== Round of 32 ==
=== Summary ===
Team 1	Agg.	Team 2	1st leg	2nd leg
Egaleo	(a) 2–2	Paniliakos	1–0	1–2
Orestis Orestiada	0–6	Panathinaikos	0–2	0–4
Skoda Xanthi	4–1	AEK Athens	2–1	2–0
Apollon Larissa	(a) 2–2	Panachaiki	1–0	1–2
Apollon Kalamarias	5–3	Kavala	3–0	2–3
Agrotikos Asteras	2–3	Anagennisi Karditsa	1–0	1–3
Apollon Athens	0–2	Orfeas Alexandroupoli	0–2	0–0
OFI	2–0	Kalamata	1–0	1–0
Aris	(a) 3–3	Ialysos	2–0	1–3
Panelefsiniakos	3–4	Panionios	3–1	0–3
Edessaikos	3–2	Athinaikos	1–0	2–2
Iraklis	4–2	Olympiacos	2–0	2–2
Ethnikos Piraeus	0–3	Ionikos	0–0	0–3
Veria	3–2	Panetolikos	0–0	3–2
Panserraikos	4–3	Niki Volos	2–1	2–2
PAOK	3–2	Proodeftiki	3–1	0–1

=== Matches ===
19 November 1997
13:00 EET

Egaleo	1–0	Paniliakos
Neofotistos 83'	Report (page 11)

Stavros Mavrothalassitis Stadium, Aigaleo
3 December 1997
13:00 EET

Paniliakos	2–1	Egaleo
Kyzeridis 55'; Sapanis 83'	Report (page 14)	Neofotistos 16'

Pyrgos Stadium, Pyrgos

Paniliakos won on away goals.

19 November 1997
13:00 EET

Orestis Orestiada	0–2	Panathinaikos
	Report (page 12)	Nasiopoulos 45', 72'

Orestiada Municipal Stadium, Orestiada
Attendance: 4,500
Referee: Argyris Papachintzios (Thessaloniki)
3 December 1997
17:00 EET

Panathinaikos	4–0	Orestis Orestiada
Alexoudis 11', 43'; Nasiopoulos 30'; Strandli 18'	Report (pages 14-15)

Olympic Stadium, Marousi
Attendance: 164
Referee: Kyros Vassaras (Thessaloniki)

Panathinaikos won 6–0 on aggregate.

19 November 1997
15:00 EET

Skoda Xanthi	2–1	AEK Athens
Zikos 41'; Chavos 55'	Report (pages 12-13)	Kasapis 18'

A.O. Xanthi Stadium, Xanthi
Attendance: 3,132
Referee: Pavlos Konstantinidis (Piraeus)
3 December 1997
19:00 EET

AEK Athens	0–2	Skoda Xanthi
	Report (page 15)	Sebwe 55'; Adamczyk 62'

Nikos Goumas Stadium, Nea Filadelfeia
Attendance: 4,198
Referee: Platonas Bozatzidis (Thessaloniki)

Skoda Xanthi won 4–1 on aggregate.

19 November 1997
13:00 EET

Apollon Larissa	1–0	Panachaiki
Gilekas 44'	Report (page 11)

Philippoupoli Ground, Larissa
3 December 1997
13:00 EET

Panachaiki	2–1	Apollon Larissa
Haxhi 74'; Kotsios 87' (o.g.)	Report (page 14)	Kotsios 90+1'

Kostas Davourlis Stadium, Patras

Apollon Larissa won on away goals.

19 November 1997
13:00 EET

Apollon Kalamarias	3–0	Kavala
Kallimanis 4'; Antić 6'; Samlidis 82'	Report (page 11)

Kalamaria Stadium, Thessaloniki
3 December 1997
13:00 EET

Kavala	3–2	Apollon Kalamarias
Athanasiadis 27', 79'; Tsapanidis 53'	Report (page 14)	Tzoulis 47'; Lioftis 82'

Anthi Karagianni Stadium, Kavala

Apollon Kalamarias won 5–3 on aggregate.

19 November 1997
13:00 EET

Agrotikos Asteras	1–0	Anagennisi Karditsa
Doumas 85'	Report (page 11)

Agrotikos Asteras Stadium, Thessaloniki
3 December 1997
13:00 EET

Anagennisi Karditsa	3–1	Agrotikos Asteras
Pavlović 33'; Bountouris 46'; Saitis 82'	Report (page 14)	Karamanlis 29'

Municipal Stadium of Karditsa, Karditsa

Anagennisi Karditsa won 3–2 on aggregate.

19 November 1997
13:00 EET

Apollon Athens	0–2	Orfeas Alexandroupoli
Chalimakoudis 28'; Demerigiev 81'	Report (page 11)

Rizoupoli Stadium, Rizoupoli
3 December 1997
13:00 EET

Orfeas Alexandroupoli	0–0	Apollon Athens
	Report (page 14)

Fotis Kosmas Stadium, Alexandroupoli

Orfeas Alexandroupoli won 2–0 on aggregate.

19 November 1997
15:00 EET

OFI	1–0	Kalamata
Kotsios 46'	Report (page 11)

Theodoros Vardinogiannis Stadium, Heraklion
3 December 1997
14:30 EET

Kalamata	0–1	OFI
	Report (page 14)	Anastasiou 85'

Kalamata Municipal Stadium, Kalamata

OFI won 2–0 on aggregate.

19 November 1997
13:00 EET

Aris	2–0	Ialysos
Mirtsekis 61'; Dalkidis 63'	Report (page 12)

Aris Stadium, Thessaloniki
24 December 1997
15:30 EET

Ialysos	3–1	Aris
Samaras 18'; Kalimeris 50'; Lamprakis 65'	Report (page 11)	Liolidis 40'

Municipal Stadium Ekonomideio, Ialysos

Aris won on away goals.

3 December 1997
13:00 EET

Panelefsiniakos	3–1	Panionios
Honi 43'; Tzivelekis 70'; Anastasopoulos 84'	Report (page 12)	Bergersen 88'

Municipal Stadium of Elefsina, Elefsina
28 January 1998
13:00 EET

Panionios	3–0	Panelefsiniakos
Fyssas 46'; Nalitzis 66', 76'	Report (page 14)

Nea Smyrni Stadium, Nea Smyrni

Panionios won 4–3 on aggregate.

19 November 1997
13:00 EET

Edessaikos	1–0	Athinaikos
Marcelo 26'	Report (page 11)

Municipal Stadium of Edessa, Edessa
3 December 1997
13:00 EET

Athinaikos	2–2	Edessaikos
Spinoulas 12'; Sidiropoulos 45'	Report (page 14)	Kryos 19'; Marcelo 29'

Vyronas National Stadium, Vyronas

Edessaikos won 3–2 on aggregate.

19 November 1997
17:30 EET

Iraklis	2–0	Olympiacos
Konstantinou 40'; Stoltidis 67'	Report (page 13)

Kaftanzoglio Stadium, Thessaloniki
Attendance: 3,761
Referee: Georgios Psychomanis (Athens)
28 January 1998
13:00 EET

Olympiacos	2–2	Iraklis
Papadopoulos 38' (o.g.); Alexandris 51'	Report (page 16)	Gonias 66'; Papadopoulos 80'

Olympic Stadium, Marousi
Attendance: 14,669
Referee: Naoum Mintiouris (Serres)

Iraklis won 4–2 on aggregate.

19 November 1997
15:00 EET

Ethnikos Piraeus	0–0	Ionikos
	Report (page 11)

Michalis Kritikopoulos Stadium, Kaisariani
3 December 1997
14:30 EET

Ionikos	3–0	Ethnikos Piraeus
Afash 16'; Frousos 51', 61'	Report (page 14)

Neapoli Stadium, Piraeus

Ionikos won 3–0 on aggregate.

19 November 1997
13:00 EET

Veria	0–0	Panetolikos
	Report (page 12)

Veria Stadium, Veria
4 December 1997
13:00 EET

Panetolikos	2–3	Veria
Comar 10'; Zacharopoulos 59'	Report (page 11)	Tziokas 18'; Neagoe 41'; Koulakiotis 77'

Panetolikos Stadium, Agrinio

Veria won 3–2 on aggregate.

19 November 1997
13:00 EET

Panserraikos	2–1	Niki Volos
Ipirotis 76'; Pempes 81'	Report (page 12)	Tsoukalas 89'

Serres Municipal Stadium, Serres
3 December 1997
13:00 EET

Niki Volos	2–2	Panserraikos
Crysostomidis 33'; Kasiouras 37'	Report (page 14)	Lobas 8', 15'

Panthessaliko Stadium, Volos

Panserraikos won 4–3 on aggregate.

19 November 1997
19:30 EET

PAOK	3–1	Proodeftiki
Vryzas 8', 50'; Toursounidis 27' (pen.)	Report (pages 13-14)	Almanidis 48'

Toumba Stadium, Thessaloniki
Attendance: 2,628
Referee: Savvas Chatzistavridis (Drama)
3 December 1997
14:30 EET

Proodeftiki	1–0	PAOK
Almanidis 84' (pen.)	Report (page 15)

Nikaia Municipal Stadium, Piraeus
Attendance: 427
Referee: Giorgos Borovilos (Arcadia)

PAOK won 3–2 on aggregate.

== Round of 16 ==
=== Summary ===
Team 1	Agg.	Team 2	1st leg	2nd leg
Veria	3–4	Skoda Xanthi	2–1	1–3
Panathinaikos	10–5	Panserraikos	4–1	6–4
OFI	3–5	Aris	2–1	1–4
Egaleo	1–5	Apollon Kalamarias	0–0	1–5
Apollon Larissa	4–0	Anagennisi Karditsa	3–0	1–0
PAOK	4–1	Ionikos	2–0	2–1
Iraklis	6–3	Edessaikos	5–0	1–3
Orfeas Alexandroupoli	0–1	Panionios	0–0	0–1

=== Matches ===
8 January 1998
14:00 EET

Veria	2–1	Skoda Xanthi
Stoica 24'; Demirtzoglou 39'	Report (page 16)	Luciano 27'

Veria Stadium, Veria
28 January 1998
14:30 EET

Skoda Xanthi	3–1	Veria
Zikos 17'; Tengelidis 78'; Karageorgiou 90'	Report (page 18)	Bujica 28'

A.O. Xanthi Stadium, Xanthi

Skoda Xanthi won 4–3 on aggregate.

8 January 1998
17:00 EET

Panathinaikos	4–1	Panserraikos
G. Ch. Georgiadis 16', 70', 85' (pen.); Strandli 35'	Report (pages 16-17)	Jovanović 12' (pen.)

Olympic Stadium, Marousi
Attendance: 790
Referee: Platonas Bozatzidis (Thessaloniki)
28 January 1998
14:30 EET

Panserraikos	4–6	Panathinaikos
Apostolakis 1' (o.g.); Valvis 30'; Papageorgiou 40'; Ademar 65'	Report (page 18)	Liberopoulos 15', 73'; Alexoudis 55'; Milojević 79' (pen.); Basinas 87'; Warzycha 89'

Serres Municipal Stadium, Serres
Attendance: 4,782
Referee: Spyros Papadakos (Laconia)

Panathinaikos won 10–5 on aggregate.

7 January 1998
15:00 EET

OFI	2–1	Aris
Tsiantakis 44'; Marinakis 56'	Report (page 16)	Vlachoudis 80'

Theodoros Vardinogiannis Stadium, Heraklion
28 January 1998
16:45 EET

Aris	4–1	OFI
Mitsopoulos 27', 40'; Liolidis 61'; Vlachoudis 90'	Report (page 18)	Riznić 70'

Aris Stadium, Thessaloniki

Aris won 5–3 on aggregate.

7 January 1998
13:00 EET

Egaleo	0–0	Apollon Kalamarias
	Report (page 16)

Stavros Mavrothalassitis Stadium, Aigaleo
28 January 1998
13:00 EET

Apollon Kalamarias	5–1	Egaleo
Leventis 4'; Donković 6'; Baltidis 40'; Lindras 73'; Lioftis 82'	Report (page 18)	Simantiras 16'

Kalamaria Stadium, Thessaloniki

Apollon Kalamarias won 5–1 on aggregate.

7 January 1998
13:00 EET

Apollon Larissa	3–0	Anagennisi Karditsa
Kakagiannis 16'; Mangos 35'; Kotsios 57'	Report (page 16)

Philippoupoli Ground, Larissa
28 January 1998
13:00 EET

Anagennisi Karditsa	0–1	Apollon Larissa
	Report (page 18)	Plitsis 29'

Municipal Stadium of Karditsa, Karditsa

Apollon Larissa won 4–0 on aggregate.

9 January 1998
19:00 EET

PAOK	2–0	Ionikos
Marangos 28'; Nagbe 47'	Report (pages 17-18)

Toumba Stadium, Thessaloniki
Attendance: 11,099
Referee: Sotiris Vorgias (Athens)
29 January 1998
14:45 EET

Ionikos	1–2	PAOK
Staboulis 89'	Report (page 19)	Marangos 34'; Vryzas 85'

Neapoli Stadium, Piraeus
Attendance: 1,150
Referee: Kostas Vallianos (Aetoloacarnania)

PAOK won 4–1 on aggregate.

9 January 1998
13:00 EET

Iraklis	5–0	Edessaikos
Kostis 2'; Christodoulou 45', 59'; Hantzidis 90'	Report (page 17)

Kaftanzoglio Stadium, Thessaloniki
Attendance: 1,402
Referee: Thanasis Velliodis (Athens)
28 January 1998
13:00 EET

Edessaikos	3–1	Iraklis
Pedrinho 79'; Samolis 87'; Fotiadis 88'	Report (pages 18-19)	Stoltidis 85'

Municipal Stadium of Edessa, Edessa
Attendance: 850
Referee: Giorgos Tsangarakis (Chania)

Iraklis won 6–3 on aggregate.

7 January 1998
13:00 EET

Orfeas Alexandroupoli	0–0	Panionios
	Report (page 16)	Fyssas 22'; Katsabis 30'

Fotis Kosmas Stadium, Alexandroupoli
28 January 1998
13:00 EET

Panionios	1–0	Orfeas Alexandroupoli
Nalitzis 41'	Report (page 18)

Nea Smyrni Stadium, Nea Smyrni

Panionios won 1–0 on aggregate.

== Quarter-finals ==
=== Summary ===
Team 1	Agg.	Team 2	1st leg	2nd leg
Aris	1–3	Panathinaikos	1–1	0–2
PAOK	2–1	Skoda Xanthi	2–0	0–1
Iraklis	4–1	Apollon Larissa	4–0	0–1
Panionios	6–2	Apollon Kalamarias	4–2	2–0

=== Matches ===
11 February 1998
19:30 EET

Aris	1–1	Panathinaikos
Nagoli 57'	Report (pages 20-21)	Warzycha 40'

Aris Stadium, Thessaloniki
Attendance: 13,632
Referee: Dionysis Stefanopoulos (Piraeus)
25 February 1998
19:45 EET

Panathinaikos	2–0	Aris
Alexoudis 7'; Liberopoulos 40'	Report (page 21)

Olympic Stadium, Marousi
Attendance: 7,861
Referee: Giorgos Bikas (Chalkidiki)

Panathinaikos won 3–1 on aggregate.

11 February 1998
17:30 EET

PAOK	2–0	Skoda Xanthi
Frantzeskos 36'; Velis 84'	Report (pages 19-20)

Toumba Stadium, Thessaloniki
Attendance: 10,565
Referee: Naoum Mintiouris (Serres)
25 February 1998
17:30 EET

Skoda Xanthi	1–0	PAOK
Vilanakis 13'	Report (page 20)

A.O. Xanthi Stadium, Xanthi
Attendance: 2,926
Referee: Michalis Kalathenos (Dodecanese)

PAOK won 2–1 on aggregate.

11 February 1998
13:00 EET

Iraklis	4–0	Apollon Larissa
Stoltidis 19'; Hantzidis 64'; Xhumba 68'; Kostis 78'	Report (pages 22-23)

Kaftanzoglio Stadium, Thessaloniki
Attendance: 1,009
Referee: Dimitris Kalyvas (Boeotia)
25 February 1998
13:00 EET

Apollon Larissa	1–0	Iraklis
Efthimiadis 87'	Report (page 23)

Philippoupoli Ground, Larissa
Attendance: 1,000
Referee: Giorgos Borovilos (Arcadia)

Iraklis won 4–1 on aggregate.

11 February 1998
13:00 EET

Panionios	4–2	Apollon Kalamarias
Medan 2', 64'; Nalitzis 30', 52'	Report (pages 21-22)	Donković 46', 59'

Nea Smyrni Stadium, Nea Smyrni
Attendance: 519
Referee: Giorgos Tsangarakis (Chania)
25 February 1998
13:00 EET

Apollon Kalamarias	0–2	Panionios
	Report (page 22)	Fyssas 22'; Katsabis 30'

Kalamaria Stadium, Thessaloniki
Attendance: 950
Referee: Dimitris Begos (Argolida)

Panionios won 6–2 on aggregate.

== Semi-finals ==
=== Summary ===
Team 1	Agg.	Team 2	1st leg	2nd leg
Panionios	2–1	PAOK	1–0	1–1
Iraklis	2–4	Panathinaikos	2–1	0–3

=== Matches ===
4 March 1998
17:00 EET

Panionios	1–0	PAOK
Vokolos 90+2'	Report (pages 23-24)

Nea Smyrni Stadium, Nea Smyrni
Attendance: 2,217
Referee: Dionysis Stefanopoulos (Piraeus)
18 March 1998
17:00 EET

PAOK	1–1	Panionios
Vryzas 82'	Report (page 24)	Nalitzis 23'

Toumba Stadium, Thessaloniki
Attendance: 20,345
Referee: Dimitris Begos (Argolida)

Panionios won 2–1 on aggregate.

4 March 1998
19:00 EET

Iraklis	2–1	Panathinaikos
Konstantinou 3'; Christodoulou 9'	Report (pages 24-25)	Nikolaidis 25'

Kaftanzoglio Stadium, Thessaloniki
Attendance: 8,284
Referee: Spyros Papadakos (Laconia)
18 March 1998
19:30 EET

Panathinaikos	3–0	Iraklis
Warzycha 48'; G. Ch. Georgiadis 73'; Liberopoulos 80'	Report (pages 25)

Olympic Stadium, Marousi
Attendance: 5,345
Referee: Georgios Psychomanis (Athens)

Panathinaikos won 4–2 on aggregate.

== Final ==
29 April 1998

Panionios	1–0	Panathinaikos
Nalitzis 53'	Report

Karaiskakis Stadium, Piraeus
Attendance: 21,436
Referee: Giorgos Borovilos (Arcadia)
