= 1998–99 Ethnikos Piraeus F.C. season =

Ethnikos Piraeus
1998–99 season
- Manager: Panagiotis Alexopoulos
- Stadium: Karaiskakis Stadium
- Alpha Ethniki: 18th (Relegated)
- Greek Cup: Second round

The 1998–99 season was Ethnikos Piraeus' 5th first-tier season in the 1990s and the 49th in total. Not managing a single league victory, the team was relegated and also exited early in the cup. It remains the last top flight appearance for Ethnikos.

== Players ==
=== Squad ===
| No. | Pos | Nat | Player | Total | | Alpha Ethniki | |
| No. | Pos | Nat | Player | Apps | Goals | Apps | Goals |
|---|---|---|---|---|---|---|---|
| 1 | GK | (Greece) GRE | Nikos Gialesakis | 11 | 0 | 11 | 0 |
| 2 | DF | (Greece) GRE | Michalis Charalampopoulos | 19 | 0 | 19 | 0 |
| 3 | DF | (Ghana) GHA | Joseph Addo | 13 | 0 | 13 | 0 |
| 4 | MF | (Greece) GRE | Georgios Papoutsis | 1 | 0 | 1 | 0 |
| 5 | DF | (Greece) GRE | Manolis Papadopoulos | 14 | 0 | 14 | 0 |
| 6 | DF | (Greece) GRE | Konstantinos Damiris | 29 | 0 | 29 | 0 |
| 7 | MF | (England) ENG | Carl Smith | 7 | 1 | 7 | 1 |
| 8 | DF | (Greece) GRE | Vasilis Vouzas | 6 | 0 | 6 | 0 |
| 8 | FW | (England) ENG | Colin Carr-Lawton | 5 | 0 | 5 | 0 |
| 9 | MF | (Greece) GRE | Giannis Tsiamakis | 6 | 0 | 6 | 0 |
| 10 | MF | (Greece) GRE | Vasilis Stavrakakis | 5 | 0 | 5 | 0 |
| 11 | MF | (Brazil) BRA | Alessandro Souza | 16 | 1 | 16 | 1 |
| 12 | FW | (Republic of Ireland) IRL | Dominic Foley | 7 | 3 | 7 | 3 |
| 13 | MF | (Greece) GRE | Andreas Dertinis | 13 | 0 | 13 | 0 |
| 14 | MF | (Cameroon) CMR | Joël Epalle | 23 | 0 | 23 | 0 |
| 15 | GK | (Albania) ALB | Armir Grimaj | 2 | 0 | 2 | 0 |
| 16 | MF | (Greece) GRE | Giorgos Kaidatzis | 6 | 0 | 6 | 0 |
| 17 | MF | (Greece) GRE | Pantelis Koubis | 28 | 3 | 28 | 3 |
| 18 | MF | (Greece) GRE | Petros Tasioulas | 21 | 1 | 21 | 1 |
| 19 | FW | (Greece) GRE | Iraklis Anastasakis | 9 | 1 | 9 | 1 |
| 20 | MF | (Greece) GRE | Panagiotis Machairas | 21 | 0 | 21 | 0 |
| 22 | MF | (Greece) GRE | Stavros Komiotis | 22 | 1 | 22 | 1 |
| 23 | MF | (Greece) GRE | Christos Kontis | 27 | 1 | 27 | 1 |
| 24 | GK | (Greece) GRE | Panagiotis Ikonomou | 6 | 0 | 6 | 0 |
| 25 | FW | (Greece) GRE | Giannis Vitevis | 5 | 0 | 5 | 0 |
| 26 | MF | (Brazil) BRA | Sandro Castro | 4 | 0 | 4 | 0 |
| 31 | FW | (Greece) GRE | Nikolaos Kakanoulias | 3 | 0 | 3 | 0 |
| 32 | MF | (Greece) GRE | Kostas Tsanas | 15 | 0 | 15 | 0 |
| 33 | DF | (Greece) GRE | Stamatis Syrigos | 16 | 0 | 16 | 0 |
| 34 | GK | (Greece) GRE | Dionysis Chiotis | 17 | 0 | 17 | 0 |
| 35 | MF | (Greece) GRE | Mattheos Platakis | 13 | 2 | 13 | 2 |
| 37 | FW | (England) ENG | John Reed | 7 | 0 | 7 | 0 |

=== Players who left during the season ===
| No. | Pos | Nat | Player | Total | | Alpha Ethniki | |
| No. | Pos | Nat | Player | Apps | Goals | Apps | Goals |
|---|---|---|---|---|---|---|---|
| 4 | DF | (Greece) GRE | Lysandros Georgamlis | 14 | 0 | 14 | 0 |
| 7 | DF | (Greece) GRE | Michalis Kapsis | 13 | 0 | 13 | 0 |
| 21 | DF | (Greece) GRE | Apostolos Dimopoulos | 12 | 0 | 12 | 0 |
| ? | MF | (Albania) ALB | Armando Cungu | 7 | 0 | 7 | 0 |
| ? | FW | (England) ENG | Paul Beavers | 9 | 2 | 9 | 2 |

== Managers ==
- Georgios Ioakimidis: start of season – 14 September 1998
- Vasilis Papachristou (caretaker): 14 September 1998 – 10 November 1998
- Lysandros Georgamlis (caretaker): 10 November 1998 – 3 December 1998
- Howard Kendall: 3 December 1998 – 14 September 1998
- Panagiotis Alexopoulos: 18 March 1999 – 30 June 1999

== Alpha Ethniki ==
=== League table ===
| Pos | Team | Pld | W | D | L | GF | GA | GD | Pts | Qualification or relegation |
|---|---|---|---|---|---|---|---|---|---|---|
| 14 | Apollon Athens | 34 | 9 | 9 | 16 | 42 | 62 | −20 | 36 | |
| 15 | Panionios | 34 | 9 | 5 | 20 | 42 | 58 | −16 | 32 (Note: Head-to-head record: Panionios–Panelefsiniakos 3–0, Panelefsiniakos–Panionios 1–0.) | |
| 16 | Panelefsiniakos (R) | 34 | 7 | 11 | 16 | 25 | 49 | −24 | 32 | Relegation to Beta Ethniki |
| 17 | Veria (R) | 34 | 6 | 5 | 23 | 20 | 55 | −35 | 23 | Relegation to Beta Ethniki |
| 18 | Ethnikos Piraeus (R) | 34 | 0 | 8 | 26 | 17 | 81 | −64 | 8 | Relegation to Beta Ethniki |

Source: Galanis Sports Data
Rules for classification: 1st points; 2nd head-to-head points; 3rd head-to-head goal difference; 4th decision match.
(R) Relegated

=== Greek Cup ===
| 11 November 1998 First round | Niki Volos | 1–2 (a.e.t.) | Ethnikos Piraeus | Volos |
| 13:00 EET | Letsios 62' | Report (page 27) | Macheras 90'; Vitevis 105' | Stadium: Panthessaliko Stadium |

| 17 December 1998 Second round | Skoda Xanthi | 1–0 (a.e.t.) | Ethnikos Piraeus | Xanthi |
| 13:00 EET | Kyparissis 92' | Report (page 30) | | Stadium: Skoda Xanthi Arena |
