= Christos Mikes =

Greek footballer

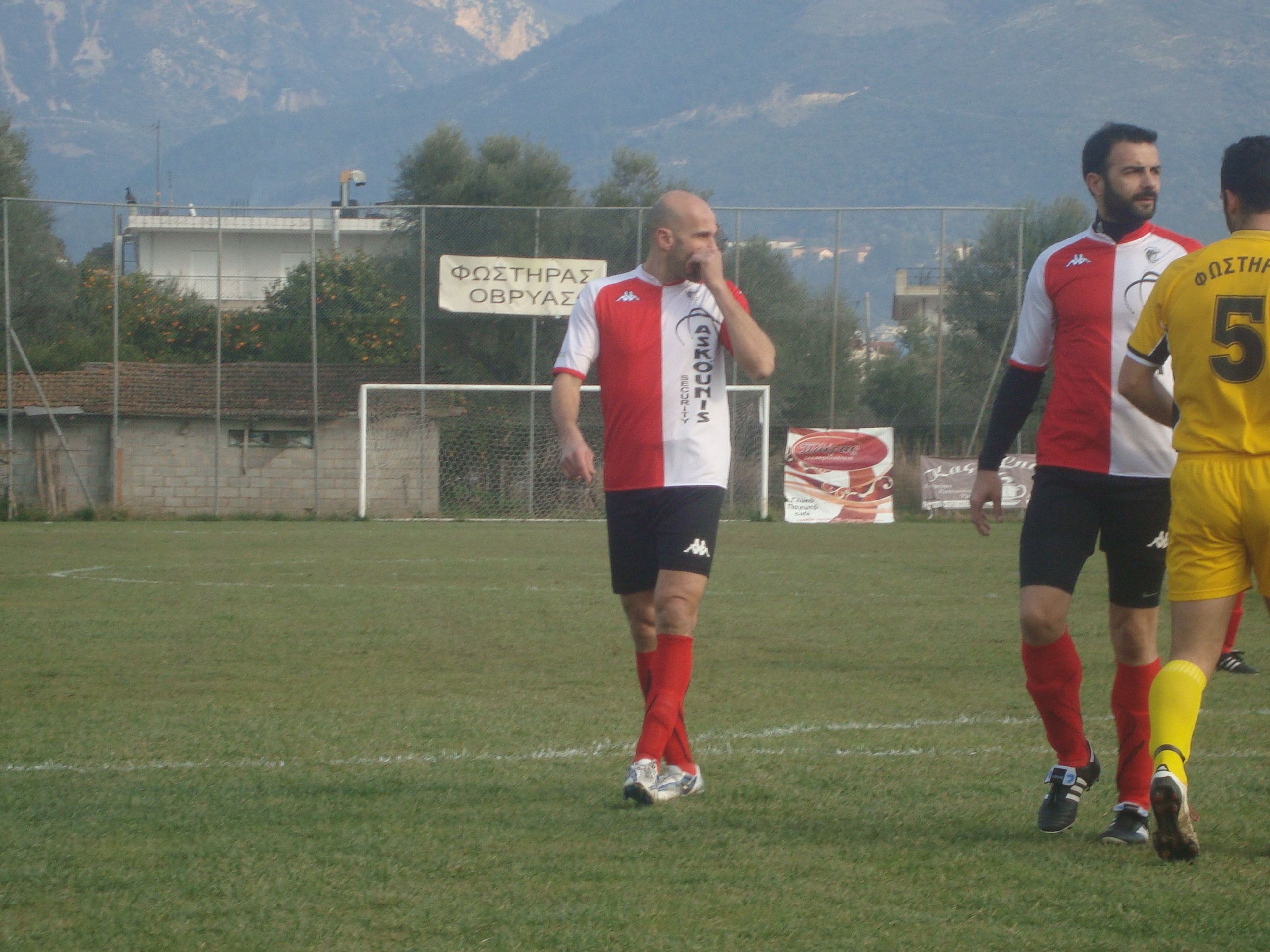
- Mikes is on the left, pictured with Christos Laios on the right.

Personal information
- Date of birth: 25 September 1971 (age 55)
- Place of birth: Patras, Greece
- Height: 1.84 m (6 ft 0 in)
- Position: Defender

Senior career*
Years	Team	Apps	(Gls)
–1989	Zavlani		
1989–1996	Panachaiki	164	(8)
1996–2000	Kalamata	91	(1)
2000–2003	Ionikos	68	(2)
2003–2005	Chalkidona	40	(10)
2005–2006	Atromitos	22	(0)
2006–2007	Veria	2	(0)

International career
1997	Greece military		
- * Club domestic league appearances and goals

Christos Mikes (Greek: Χρήστος Μικές; born 23 September 1971) is a Greek retired professional footballer who played as a defender.

== Club career ==
Mikes started his career with Zavlani. In 1989, he moved to Panachaiki, in where he played the next seven years. In 1996, he went to Kalamata and four years later, he moved to Ionikos.

The seasons 2003-04 and 2004-05 he played in Chalkidona and the season 2005–06 he played in Atromitos after the merge of two clubs. The next season, he moved to Veria, in where remained only one season. The next years he continued in lower leagues, in Achilleas Kamaron and Niki Proastiou.

== International career ==
He was in the Greece national team that won the 1997 World Military Cup.
