= 1997–98 Beta Ethniki =

Beta Ethniki
- Season: 1997–98
- Dates: 7 September 1997 – 8 June 1998
- Champions: Aris
- Promoted: Aris; Panelefsiniakos; Ethnikos Asteras
- Relegated: Doxa Drama; Levadiakos; Panargiakos; Kastoria

Beta Ethniki 1997–98 complete season.

== League table ==
Location of teams in 1997–98 Beta Ethniki

Pos	Team	Pld	W	D	L	GF	GA	GD	Pts	Promotion or relegation
1	Aris (C, P)	34	20	12	2	52	18	+34	72	Promotion to Alpha Ethniki
2	Panelefsiniakos (P)	34	20	9	5	63	24	+39	69	Promotion to Alpha Ethniki
3	Ethnikos Asteras (P)	34	19	10	5	65	33	+32	67	Promotion to Alpha Ethniki
4	Panserraikos	34	18	8	8	75	44	+31	62	
5	Niki Volos	34	17	3	14	37	46	−9	54	
6	Panetolikos	34	14	11	9	55	42	+13	53	
7	Trikala	34	13	9	12	42	36	+6	48	
8	Edessaikos	34	14	5	15	48	55	−7	47	
9	AEL	34	11	13	10	37	42	−5	46	
10	Kallithea	34	11	12	11	42	37	+5	45	
11	Anagennisi Karditsa	34	11	10	13	46	47	−1	43	
12	Doxa Vyronas	34	11	9	14	41	43	−2	42	
13	Apollon Kalamarias	34	11	9	14	37	45	−8	42	
14	ILTEX Lykoi	34	11	8	15	36	39	−3	41	
15	Doxa Drama (R)	34	10	4	20	39	43	−4	34	Relegation to Gamma Ethniki
16	Levadiakos (R)	34	7	9	18	43	61	−18	30	Relegation to Gamma Ethniki
17	Panargiakos (R)	34	6	7	21	31	69	−38	25	Relegation to Gamma Ethniki
18	Kastoria (R)	34	4	8	22	19	61	−42	20	Relegation to Gamma Ethniki

(C) Champions; (P) Promoted; (R) Relegated

== Results ==
Home \ Away	KRD	APL	ARIS	DOX	DXV	EDE	ETA	LYK	KLT	KAS	AEL	LEV	NVL	PRG	PNF	PNT	PSE	TRI
Anagennisi Karditsa		0–2	0–1	5–0	1–1	5–2	1–3	2–0	2–0	3–0	0–1	1–3	3–1	2–1	2–2	3–3	3–2	2–2
Apollon Kalamarias	0–0		0–0	3–1	1–2	1–1	1–1	1–1	1–0	1–0	2–1	4–1	2–1	2–2	1–2	0–1	0–2	3–0
Aris	2–1	0–1		1–0	1–1	5–0	3–1	3–0	3–0	2–1	1–1	3–2	1–0	5–0	3–0	1–1	2–1	0–2
Doxa Drama	3–2	3–0	0–2		0–4	2–1	0–4	2–0	0–3	1–0	2–2	3–2	1–1	6–1	0–2	2–0	0–1	1–0
Doxa Vyronas	0–1	5–0	0–0	1–2		2–0	3–2	0–0	1–0	2–2	0–1	1–1	2–0	2–1	0–2	2–3	2–1	2–1
Edessaikos	3–4	1–1	1–1	2–1	2–0		1–2	2–3	2–1	3–0	3–0	2–1	3–0	3–1	0–2	2–0	3–1	1–0
Ethnikos Asteras	4–0	2–1	1–1	1–0	2–2	3–0		1–1	1–1	1–1	2–0	2–0	5–0	3–2	4–1	2–1	2–2	2–0
ILTEX Lykoi	2–0	1–1	0–2	4–0	2–0	1–2	0–1		3–0	0–1	1–0	1–1	3–1	3–1	1–3	1–1	0–0	0–0
Kallithea	1–1	2–1	0–1	1–1	1–1	1–0	0–2	2–0		3–0	1–1	4–0	0–2	4–1	1–1	1–1	1–1	2–1
Kastoria	1–2	0–2	1–1	3–1	0–0	0–2	0–1	1–2	1–3		1–1	0–5	1–0	2–0	0–2	0–0	1–1	0–2
AEL	0–0	1–0	1–1	3–1	1–0	3–0	2–2	0–1	2–1	1–0		3–2	1–1	0–1	1–1	3–1	2–2	1–1
Levadiakos	2–0	0–2	0–0	2–1	1–0	1–3	1–1	0–1	0–2	0–0	2–3		1–2	4–0	0–2	0–0	4–9	1–1
Niki Volos	1–0	2–1	0–1	2–0	2–1	3–0	1–0	1–0	1–3	3–0	0–0	2–0		1–0	1–0	3–2	1–0	1–0
Panargiakos	0–0	4–0	1–2	0–0	1–2	1–1	1–2	1–0	0–0	1–0	4–0	1–1	1–0		0–0	1–2	2–7	0–1
Panelefsiniakos	3–0	1–0	0–1	3–1	2–0	3–0	1–1	3–1	2–0	4–0	1–1	1–1	5–0	2–0		1–1	6–0	2–0
Panetolikos	0–0	4–1	1–1	6–1	3–0	1–0	2–0	2–1	0–0	2–1	5–0	2–3	1–2	4–0	1–0		2–2	1–0
Panserraikos	1–0	2–0	0–0	2–1	2–0	3–0	3–2	2–1	1–1	7–1	1–0	2–0	3–1	4–1	1–2	5–1		3–0
Trikala	0–0	1–1	0–1	1–0	4–2	2–2	0–2	2–1	2–2	2–0	1–0	2–1	4–0	4–0	1–1	3–0	2–1	

Legend: Blue = home team win; Yellow = draw; Red = away team win.

== Top scorers ==
Rank	Player	Club	Goals
1	(Federal Republic of Yugoslavia) Davor Jakovljević	Ethnikos Asteras	34
2	(Brazil) Ademar	Panserraikos	23
3	(Greece) Theodoros Armylagos	Panelefsiniakos	20
4	(Federal Republic of Yugoslavia) Dušan Jovanović	Panserraikos	17
5	(Greece) Michalis Klokidis	Levadiakos	14
5	(Brazil) Marcello Troisi	Edessaikos	14
