= Dionysius Sebwe =

Liberian footballer (born 1969)

Personal information
- Date of birth: March 7, 1969 (age 57)
- Place of birth: Monrovia, Liberia
- Height: 1.70 m (5 ft 7 in)
- Position: Defender

Youth career
- 1993–1995: Park College

Senior career*
Years	Team	Apps	(Gls)
1996–1997	Kansas City Wizards	0	(0)
1997	Orlando Sundogs	1	(0)
1997–1998	FC Utrecht	2	(0)
1998–1999	SC Heerenveen		
1999–2000	Kansas City Wizards		
2000–2002	Minnesota Thunder	7	(1)

International career
1996–2002	Liberia	7	(0)
- * Club domestic league appearances and goals

Dionysius "Dion" Sebwe (born March 7, 1969) is a Liberian former professional footballer who played as a defender. He has served as the Deputy Minister for Operations in the Liberian Ministry of Defense.

Sebwe was born in Monrovia. He attended Park College where he played soccer. In March 1995, the Kansas City Wizards selected Sebwe in the 1996 MLS College Draft. On April 17, 1996, the Kansas City Wizards released him. He is a former member of the Liberia national team.

Sebwe served in the U.S. Army. His brother is Kelvin Sebwe.
