= Vasilios Ioannidis =

Greek footballer

Personal information
- Date of birth: 24 June 1967 (age 59)
- Place of birth: Esslingen, West Germany
- Position: Defender

Youth career
- Pandramaikos A.O.

Senior career*
Years	Team	Apps	(Gls)
1988–1993	Apollon Kalamarias	79	(4)
1993–1997	Olympiacos	54	(4)
1997–1999	Panionios	48	(8)
1999–2000	Proodeftiki	21	(2)
Total		202	(18)

International career
1993–1994	Greece	3	(0)
- * Club domestic league appearances and goals

Vasilios Ioannidis (born 24 June 1967) is a Greek former professional footballer who played as a defender. His son Fotis is also a footballer.

== Honours ==
Panionios

- Greek Cup: 1997–98
