= Jean Dénis Wanga =

Cameroonian footballer

Personal information
- Full name: Jean-Dénis Wanga-Edingue
- Date of birth: 12 April 1975 (age 51)
- Place of birth: Cameroon
- Height: 1.80 m (5 ft 11 in)
- Position: Midfielder

Senior career*
Years	Team	Apps	(Gls)
1994–1995	Union Douala		
1995–1996	Pannafpliakos	28	(4)
1996–1997	Panargiakos	29	(6)
1997–1999	Panelefsiniakos	45	(5)
2000	Coquimbo Unido		
2000–2001	Acharnaikos	19	(3)
2001–2004	Egaleo	66	(4)
2004–2005	Kallithea	19	(0)
2005–2007	Kalamata		

International career
1994	Cameroon	1	(0)
- * Club domestic league appearances and goals

Jean-Dénis Wanga-Edingue (born 12 April 1975) is a retired Cameroonian football player.

Wanga spent most of his career in Greece and played for Panelefsiniakos, Egaleo and Kallithea in the Greek Alpha Ethniki. He also had a brief spell in Chile with Coquimbo Unido during 2000.

Wanga made one appearance for the Cameroon national football team in a 1994 friendly tournament.

== See also ==
- Football in Cameroon
- List of football clubs in Cameroon
