= Iraklis Anastasakis =

Greek footballer

Personal information
- Date of birth: 22 December 1971 (age 54)
- Position: Forward

Senior career*
Years	Team	Apps	(Gls)
1993–1997	Panachaiki		
1997–1999	Ethnikos Piraeus		
- * Club domestic league appearances and goals

Iraklis Anastasakis (Greek: Ηρακλής Αναστασάκης; born 22 December 1971) is a retired Greek football striker.
