= Spyros Chatzis =

Greek footballer (born 1977)

Personal information
- Full name: Spyridon Chatzis
- Date of birth: 24 August 1977 (age 49)
- Place of birth: Rhodos, Greece
- Height: 1.72 m (5 ft 8 in)
- Position: Midfielder

Senior career*
Years	Team	Apps	(Gls)
1996–2002	Apollon Smyrnis		
2002–2003	Akratitos		
2003–2004	Niki Volos		
2004–2005	Anagennisi Arta		
2005–2007	Panetolikos		
2008	Thyella Patras		
2008–2009	Panachaiki		
2009–2010	Panegialios		
2002–2003	Akratitos		
- * Club domestic league appearances and goals

Spyros Chatzis (Greek: Σπύρος Χατζής; born 24 August 1977) is a Greek former professional footballer who played as a midfielder.
