= 1998–99 Alpha Ethniki =

63rd season of top-tier football league in Greece

Alpha Ethniki
- Season: 1998–99
- Champions: Olympiacos; 28th Greek title
- Relegated: Panelefsiniakos; Veria; Ethnikos Piraeus
- Champions League: Olympiacos; AEK Athens
- UEFA Cup: Panathinaikos; PAOK; Ionikos; Aris
- Matches: 306
- Goals: 832 (2.72 per match)
- Top goalscorer: Demis Nikolaidis (22 goals)

The 1998–99 Alpha Ethniki was the 63rd season of the highest football league of Greece. The season began on 22 August 1998 and ended on 30 May 1999. Olympiacos won their third consecutive and 28th Greek title.

== Teams ==
Promoted from 1997–98 Beta Ethniki	Relegated from 1997–98 Alpha Ethniki
Aris; Panelefsiniakos; Ethnikos Asteras	Panachaiki; Kalamata; Athinaikos

=== Stadiums and personnel ===
Location of teams in 1998–99 Alpha Ethniki

Team	Manager^{1}	Location	Stadium
AEK Athens	(Ukraine) Oleg Blokhin	Athens (Nea Filadelfeia)	Nikos Goumas Stadium
Apollon Athens	(Greece) Andreas Michalopoulos	Athens (Rizoupoli)	Rizoupoli Stadium
Aris	(Greece) Alketas Panagoulias	Thessaloniki (Charilaou)	Kleanthis Vikelidis Stadium
Ethnikos Asteras	(Greece) Spyros Livathinos	Athens (Kaisariani)	Michalis Kritikopoulos Stadium
Ethnikos Piraeus	(Greece) Panagiotis Alexopoulos	Piraeus (Neo Faliro)	Karaiskakis Stadium
Ionikos	(Uruguay) Sergio Markarián	Piraeus (Nikaia)	Neapoli Stadium
Iraklis	(Sweden) Mats Jingblad	Thessaloniki (Triandria)	Kaftanzoglio Stadium
Kavala	(Greece) Makis Katsavakis	Kavala	Kavala National Stadium
OFI	(Netherlands) Eugène Gerards	Heraklion	Theodoros Vardinogiannis Stadium
Olympiacos	(Bosnia and Herzegovina) Dušan Bajević	Athens (Marousi)	Athens Olympic Stadium
Panathinaikos	(Greece) Vasilios Daniil	Athens (Marousi)	Athens Olympic Stadium
Panelefsiniakos	(Greece) Stathis Stathopoulos	Athens (Elefsina)	Municipal Stadium of Elefsina
Paniliakos	(Greece) Babis Tennes	Pyrgos	Pyrgos Stadium
Panionios	(Republic of Ireland) Ronnie Whelan	Athens (Nea Smyrni)	Nea Smyrni Stadium
PAOK	(Netherlands) Arie Haan	Thessaloniki (Toumba)	Toumba Stadium
Proodeftiki	(Greece) Nikos Alefantos	Piraeus (Nikaia)	Nikaia Municipal Stadium
Skoda Xanthi	(Greece) Giannis Matzourakis	Xanthi	Xanthi Ground
Veria	(Greece) Petros Ravousis	Veria	Veria Stadium

- ^{1} On final match day of the season, played on 30 May 1999.

== League table ==
Pos	Team	Pld	W	D	L	GF	GA	GD	Pts	Qualification or relegation
1	Olympiacos (C)	34	27	4	3	82	22	+60	85	Qualification for Champions League first group stage
2	AEK Athens	34	23	6	5	71	27	+44	75	Qualification for Champions League third qualifying round
3	Panathinaikos	34	23	5	6	66	36	+30	74	Qualification for UEFA Cup first round
4	PAOK	34	19	5	10	52	31	+21	62	Qualification for UEFA Cup first round
5	Ionikos	34	17	9	8	64	36	+28	60 (Note: Head-to-head record: Aris–Ionikos 1–1, Ionikos–Aris 3–0.)	Qualification for UEFA Cup first round
6	Aris	34	19	3	12	53	43	+10	60	Qualification for UEFA Cup first round
7	Skoda Xanthi	34	16	8	10	44	33	+11	56	
8	OFI	34	16	3	15	50	44	+6	51	
9	Iraklis	34	13	8	13	54	45	+9	47	
10	Kavala	34	12	6	16	46	62	−16	42	
11	Ethnikos Asteras	34	11	7	16	40	58	−18	40	
12	Proodeftiki	34	10	9	15	28	37	−9	39	
13	Paniliakos	34	11	5	18	37	54	−17	38	
14	Apollon Athens	34	9	9	16	42	62	−20	36	
15	Panionios	34	9	5	20	42	58	−16	32 (Note: Head-to-head record: Panionios–Panelefsiniakos 3–0, Panelefsiniakos–Panionios 1–0.)	
16	Panelefsiniakos (R)	34	7	11	16	25	49	−24	32	Relegation to Beta Ethniki
17	Veria (R)	34	6	5	23	20	55	−35	23	Relegation to Beta Ethniki
18	Ethnikos Piraeus (R)	34	0	8	26	17	81	−64	8	Relegation to Beta Ethniki

Source: Galanis Sports Data
Rules for classification: 1st points; 2nd head-to-head points; 3rd head-to-head goal difference; 4th decision match.
(C) Champions; (R) Relegated

== Results ==
Home \ Away	AEK	APA	ARIS	ETA	ETH	ION	IRA	KAV	OFI	OLY	PAO	PNE	PNL	PGSS	PAOK	PRO	XAN	VER
AEK Athens		3–1	6–0	3–1	2–0	2–1	2–2	4–0	2–0	2–0	2–0	6–2	3–1	3–0	2–0	1–0	2–1	2–0
Apollon Athens	1–1		1–3	2–2	4–0	1–1	1–3	1–1	1–0	2–5	1–3	1–1	5–0	0–0	1–4	2–2	2–1	2–0
Aris	2–0	2–1		2–0	4–0	1–1	2–1	3–1	3–1	1–0	0–1	0–0	3–1	2–1	2–0	1–0	1–2	2–0
Ethnikos Asteras	2–3	5–1	0–1		1–0	1–1	1–0	3–2	1–0	1–3	0–1	0–0	1–0	2–2	1–0	2–2	0–1	4–0
Ethnikos Piraeus	1–4	2–3	1–1	1–2		1–2	1–2	0–2	1–3	0–3	0–0	2–2	1–1	0–4	1–1	0–2	1–1	0–2
Ionikos	2–1	3–0	3–0	5–0	5–0		0–2	4–2	2–0	1–3	4–4	3–0	1–1	4–3	1–0	2–0	0–1	1–0
Iraklis	2–3	2–0	2–1	1–1	4–0	2–1		2–2	3–0	0–2	3–3	2–3	3–1	2–0	1–0	0–1	2–2	2–0
Kavala	2–1	3–1	0–1	3–0	3–0	1–3	2–0		0–2	0–2	2–1	3–0	1–1	1–5	1–1	2–1	1–1	2–1
OFI	0–1	0–1	2–4	1–1	3–0	2–1	3–1	4–0		1–2	2–3	3–0	3–1	2–0	3–2	0–0	4–2	3–0
Olympiacos	0–0	0–0	1–0	4–2	2–0	2–0	3–2	4–1	3–0		0–0	1–1	3–0	5–0	2–1	6–1	3–1	5–0
Panathinaikos	0–0	5–0	3–1	4–1	5–1	2–1	3–2	6–2	1–0	2–4		2–0	2–1	2–1	0–1	1–0	2–1	1–0
Panelefsiniakos	0–0	1–0	0–1	1–2	3–0	1–1	0–0	1–1	1–2	0–2	1–2		1–2	1–0	0–4	0–1	0–0	2–0
Paniliakos	0–1	3–1	3–1	1–0	2–0	1–4	2–1	2–0	1–2	1–0	1–2	2–0		2–0	1–2	1–2	1–0	0–0
Panionios	1–3	4–2	3–2	2–0	2–0	0–2	3–2	1–2	0–1 (Note: Panionios-OFI abandoned in 30' (9th Round 9/11/99) due to flood-lights problems. The remaining 60' were played in 2/12/99.)	1–4	0–2	3–0	5–2		0–1	0–0	0–2	0–0
PAOK	2–1	3–1	1–4	5–1	0–0	0–0	2–1	1–0	3–1	1–2 (Note: PAOK-Olympiacos was abandoned in 82' at 1-2 after riots from the PAOK fans. Original score remained.)	2–0	3–1	2–0	3–0		1–0	0–0	1–0
Proodeftiki	1–1	0–1	2–1	3–0	0–0	0–0	0–0	1–0	0–1	0–1	1–2	0–1	2–0	0–0	2–1		1–2	1–0
Skoda Xanthi	2–1	1–0	2–0	0–1	2–0	2–2	0–0	4–1	3–1	0–2	1–0	0–0	2–1	1–0	0–1	4–1		2–0
Veria	0–3	1–1	0–1	3–1	4–3	0–2	0–2	0–2	0–0	0–3	0–1	0–1	0–0	3–1	1–2	3–1	2–0	

Source: Worldfootball.net
Legend: Blue = home team win; Yellow = draw; Red = away team win.

== Top scorers ==
Rank	Player	Club	Goals
1	(Greece) Demis Nikolaidis	AEK Athens	22
2	(Greece) Nikos Frousos	Ionikos	18
3	(Poland) Leszek Pisz	Kavala	14
3	(Senegal) Ismail Ba	Skoda Xanthi	14
5	(Greece) Nikos Liberopoulos	Panathinaikos	13
5	(Greece) Christos Maladenis	AEK Athens	13
5	(Brazil) Paulo Andrioli	Ionikos / Aris	13
8	(Greece) Grigoris Georgatos	Olympiacos	12
8	(Poland) Krzysztof Warzycha	Panathinaikos	12
10	(Greece) Apostolos Liolidis	Aris	11

== Awards ==
=== Annual awards ===
Annual awards were announced on 1 December 1999.

Award	Winner	Club
Greek Player of the Season	(Greece) Grigoris Georgatos	Olympiacos
Foreign Player of the Season	(Cyprus) Siniša Gogić	Olympiacos
Young Player of the Season	(Greece) Nikos Iordanidis	OFI
Goalkeeper of the Season	(Greece) Ilias Atmatsidis	AEK Athens
Golden Boot	(Greece) Demis Nikolaidis	AEK Athens
Manager of the Season	(Bosnia and Herzegovina) Dušan Bajević	Olympiacos

== Attendances ==
Olympiacos drew the highest average home attendance in the 1998–99 Alpha Ethniki.

#	Team	Average attendance
1	Olympiacos	11,092
2	AEK Athens	10,169
3	PAOK	9,692
4	Aris	8,584
5	Panathinaikos	8,153
6	Iraklis	4,172
7	OFI	2,611
8	Ethnikos Asteras	2,443
9	Skoda Xanthi	2,295
10	Panionios	2,083
11	Kavala	2,025
12	Paniliakos	1,825
13	Ionikos	1,735
14	Apollon Athens	1,715
15	Panelefsiniakos	1,679
16	Proodeftiki	1,335
17	Veria	1,282
18	Ethnikos Piraeus	1,258
