= Serge Honi =

Cameroonian footballer

Personal information
- Full name: Serge Honi
- Date of birth: 11 September 1973 (age 53)
- Place of birth: Douala, Cameroon
- Height: 1.87 m (6 ft 1 1/2 in)
- Position: Forward

Youth career
- Canon Yaoundé

Senior career*
Years	Team	Apps	(Gls)
1993–1995	Belenenses	5	(0)
1994–1995	→ Famalicão (loan)	29	(5)
1995–1996	AEL	9	(2)
1996	Naoussa		
1996	PAS Giannina		
1997	Ethnikos Piraeus		
1997–1998	Panelefsiniakos		
1998–1999	Alki Larnaca	26	(17)
1999–2000	Olympiakos Nicosia	26	(18)
2000–2001	AEK Larnaca	21	(9)
2001–2002	Kastoria		
2002–2003	Chalkida		
2003–2004	Thrasyvoulos		

International career
1994	Cameroon	2	(0)
- * Club domestic league appearances and goals

Serge Honi (born 11 September 1973, in Douala) is a retired Cameroonian footballer who played as a forward.

He spent most of his 11-year professional career in Greece, representing eight different clubs.

== Club career ==
Honi began playing football with Canon Yaoundé. He started his professional career with C.F. Os Belenenses in the Portuguese top division, appearing in only five scoreless games during his only season, and going on loan to F.C. Famalicão in the second level for the following season.

Honi moved to Greece in July 1995, initially joining first division side AEL for one season. However, he left for level two side Naoussa F.C. in January of the following year, spending the following season with PAS Giannina F.C. and Ethnikos Piraeus, also in division two.

The next season, still in the same country, Honi played for Panelefsiniakos (second level). After three seasons in Cyprus, he returned to Greece and played for Kastoria F.C. in the fourth division. After another season in the same category with Chalida FC, he joined third division side Thrasyvoulos FC.

Honi retired from football in June 2004, at the age of 30.

== International career ==
Honi played twice for Cameroon, both his appearances coming in 1994.
