= Branko Milovanović =

Serbian footballer (born 1973)

Personal information
- Full name: Branko Milovanović
- Date of birth: 13 January 1973 (age 53)
- Place of birth: Osečina, SFR Yugoslavia
- Height: 1.82 m (6 ft 0 in)
- Position: Attacking midfielder

Team information
- Current team: Las Palmas (Chief Scout)

Youth career
- 1991: Podgorka Osečina

Senior career*
Years	Team	Apps	(Gls)
1991–1995	OFK Beograd	70	(10)
1995–1996	Deportivo La Coruña	12	(0)
1996–1998	Vitória Guimarães	31	(4)
1999	AEK Athens	14	(2)
2000	Ethnikos Asteras	15	(2)
2000–2001	Milicionar	12	(1)
2001–2002	Charleroi	14	(0)
2003–2004	Vojvodina	21	(1)
Total		189	(20)
- * Club domestic league appearances and goals

Branko Milovanović (Serbian Cyrillic: Бранко Миловановић; born 13 January 1973) is a Serbian former professional footballer who played as an attacking midfielder.

In his homeland, Milovanović represented OFK Beograd, Milicionar, and Vojvodina. He also played in the top leagues of Spain, Portugal, Greece, and Belgium.

== Club career ==
Milovanović began his career in 1991 with OFK Beograd establishing himself as a key player of the team. In 1995 he made the big step in his career and joined the Spanish Deportivo La Coruña, where he spent a season. Afterwards, he signed for the Portuguese Vitória Guimarães. On 29 January 1999 he was transferred for the Greek side AEK Athens for a fee of 200 million drachmas. Despite having good performances with the club, he wasn't in the level that they would have wanted for the position. Thus on 7 October 1999 his contract was terminated and in January 2000 he signed for Ethnikos Asteras.

In the following season Milovanović returned to Serbia and signed for Milicionar. He then played for Charleroi and Vojvodina before ending his career in 2005.

== After football ==
After the end of his career, Milovanović served as a technical director of Lokomotiv Plovdiv from 2011 to 2012. Afterwards he took charge at Las Palmas until 2014. On 24 June 2014 Milovanović returned to AEK as their technical director, until 15 July 2016. From 2016 he works as a scout for Las Palmas.
