= Christos Laios =

Greek footballer

Personal information
- Date of birth: 23 July 1972 (age 54)
- Place of birth: Agrinio, Greece
- Height: 1.86 m (6 ft 1 in)
- Position: Midfielder

Senior career*
| Years | Team | Apps | (Gls) |
| 1998–2001 | Apollon Smyrnis | | |
| 2001–? | Panetolikos | | |
| 2003–? | Thyella Patras | | |
- * Club domestic league appearances and goals

Christos Laios (Greek: Χρήστος Λάιος; born 23 July 1972) is a retired Greek football midfielder.
