= Panagiotis Macheras =

Greek footballer (born 1976)

Personal information
- Full name: Panagiotis Ioannis Macheras
- Date of birth: 12 September 1976 (age 50)
- Place of birth: Athens, Greece
- Height: 1.78 m (5 ft 10 in)
- Position: Defender

Senior career*
Years	Team	Apps	(Gls)
1997–1998	Aspropyrgos		
1998–2000	Ethnikos Piraeus		
2000–2001	Panelefsiniakos		
2001	Marko		
2002	Chaidari		
2002–2003	Atromitos		
2003–2004	Patraikos		
2004	Ethnikos Asteras		
2005–2007	Levadiakos		
2007–2008	Diagoras		
2008–2009	Ilisiakos		
2009–2010	Agioi Anargyroi		
2010–2011	Agios Ierotheos		
- * Club domestic league appearances and goals

Panagiotis Macheras (Greek: Παναγιώτης Μαχαίρας; born 12 September 1976) is a retired Greek football defender.
