= Kelvin Sebwe =

Liberian retired footballer (born 1972)

Personal information
- Full name: Kelvin Sebwe
- Date of birth: 4 April 1972 (age 54)
- Place of birth: Monrovia, Liberia
- Height: 1.87 m (6 ft 2 in)
- Position: Midfielder

Senior career*
Years	Team	Apps	(Gls)
1988–1992	Black Star		
1992–1993	AS Monaco	0	(0)
1993–1994	R.F.C. Liégeois	33	(9)
1994–1996	Toulouse	56	(5)
1996–1997	Skoda Xanthi	32	(2)
1997–1999	AEK Athens	30	(2)
1999–2000	Iraklis	32	(6)
2000–2001	Patraikos	17	(1)
2000–2001	Panachaiki	19	(1)
2001–2002	Dhafra		
2002–2003	Al-Ahli (Dubai)		
2003–2004	Al-Jazira Club		
2004–2005	Panserraikos	23	(2)
2005–2008	Kavala	38	(3)
2006–2007	→ Doxa Drama (loan)	16	(3)
2008–2009	Ifaistos Peristeri		
2009–2010	Asteras Drepaniakos	29	(22)

International career
1986–2009	Liberia	73	(17)
- * Club domestic league appearances and goals as of 30 April 2008

Kelvin Sebwe (born 4 April 1972) is a Liberian retired footballer who played as a midfielder. Sebwe was also a member of the Liberia national football team. His brother is Dionysius Sebwe. He made his international debut against the Eagles of Mali on home soil in the 1988 African Nations Cup Qualifiers which his side lost 1–0 as a result of an early minute goal conceded.

== Club career ==
Sebwe began his career in 1988 at Black Star. In 1992 he moved to France a season at AS Monaco and later at R.F.C. Liégeois. Afterwards he moved at the Ligue 1 side Toulouse, where he played for two seasons.

In the summer of 1996 Sebwe traveled to Greece for and signed for Skoda Xanthi. He made good performances with the club and attracted the interest of AEK Athens after he had eliminated in the Cup. On 12 December 1997 Sebwe was eventually transferred to AEK for a fee of 350 million drachmas. His unstable performances, as well as his frequent injuries did not let him establish himself as a regular in the squad. On 6 August 1999 Sebwe left was transferred to Iraklis where he spent a season as a regular. Afterwards he compteted for lower division clubs, such as Patraikos and Panachaiki.

In 2001 Sebwe went to the United Arab Emirates and played for Dhafra, Al-Ahli (Dubai) and Al-Jazira Club. In 2004 he returned to Greece spending a season at Panserraikos and then moving Kavala, Doxa Drama. He also played at an amateur level with AO Poros, Ifaistos Peristeri and Asteras Drepaniakos before retiring in 2010..
