= Dušan Jovanović (footballer, born 1971) =

Serbian footballer

Personal information
- Full name: Dušan Jovanović
- Date of birth: 5 June 1971 (age 55)
- Place of birth: SFR Yugoslavia
- Position: Forward

Senior career*
| Years | Team | Apps | (Gls) |
| 1992–1994 | Pontioi Veria | 57 | (16) |
| 1994–1997 | Panetolikos | 97 | (26) |
| 1997–1998 | Panserraikos | 34 | (17) |
| 1998–2000 | Panachaiki | 67 | (19) |
| 2000–2001 | Panionios | 24 | (0) |
| 2001–2002 | Nafpaktiakos Asteras | | |
| 2002–2004 | Panserraikos | 52 | (18) |
- * Club domestic league appearances and goals

Dušan Jovanović (Serbian Cyrillic: Душан Јовановић; born 5 June 1971) is a retired footballer who played as a forward for clubs in Greece.

== Playing career ==
Jovanović spent most of his career playing for clubs in the Greek second division, including Pontioi Veria F.C., Panetolikos F.C., Panserraikos F.C. and Panachaiki He helped Panachaiki gain promotion to the Super League Greece and would play the following season in the top flight with the club.

In June 2000, he moved to Panionios on a two-year contract.
