= Apostolos Liolidis =

Greek footballer

Personal information
- Date of birth: 13 August 1977 (age 49)
- Place of birth: Thessaloniki, Greece
- Height: 1.85 m (6 ft 1 in)
- Position: Striker

Senior career*
| Years | Team | Apps | (Gls) |
| 1995–2002 | Aris | 138 | (39) |
| 2002–2003 | Atalanta | 2 | (0) |
| 2003 | Alzano Virescit | 12 | (7) |
| 2003–2004 | Panionios | 9 | (0) |
| 2004–2005 | Aris | 12 | (1) |
| 2005–2006 | Niki Volos | | |
| 2006–2009 | Ilioupoli | | |

International career^{‡}
| 1999 | Greece | 2 | (1) |
- * Club domestic league appearances and goals ‡ National team caps and goals as of 20 August 1999

Apostolos Liolidis (born 13 August 1977) is a Greek retired footballer who last played for Ilioupoli. He has previously played for Aris, Atalanta, Alzano Virescit, Panionios and Niki Volos, as well as the Greek national side.
