= 1999–2000 Greek Football Cup =

1999–2000 Greek Cup
Tournament details
- Country: Greece
- Teams: 56

Final positions
- Champions: AEK Athens (12th title)
- Runners-up: Ionikos

Tournament statistics
- Matches played: 160
- Goals scored: 499 (3.12 per match)
- Top goal scorer(s): Demis Nikolaidis (11 goals)

The 1999–2000 Greek Football Cup was the 58th edition of the Greek Football Cup.

== Tournament details ==
Totally 56 teams participated, 18 from Alpha Ethniki, 18 from Beta, and 20 from Gamma. It was held in 6 rounds, included final. An additional round was held between first and second, with 4 matches, in order that the teams would continue to be 16.

This year came back the Group stage, after its provisional three-year suppression. Until quarter-finals, all matches were single. The most interesting round was Second, after drawing of Olympiacos against PAOK and Aris against Panathinaikos, with the home teams to take the qualification with difficulty.

Final was contested by AEK Athens, who previously eliminated rivals Olympiacos and Ionikos, for their first and only time in history, having favourable draws in their course to the Final, but also after a very difficult qualification from the Group stage in the goals difference, after triple equivalence in standings with Leonidio and Panetolikos. However, the win with score 8–0 against Nafpaktiakos Asteras in quarter-finals was remarkable.

AEK Athens easily won the game 3-0 and earned their 12th cup in club's history. A remarkable moment of the final was at 32nd minute while score was at 0–0, after a cross from Petkov, Demis Nikolaidis scored with his hand. The referee Douros did not realize the violation of Nikolaidis and ran towards the center of the pitch, with Nikolaidis immediately showing him that he should not count the goal. The referee approached Nikolaidis, who explained to him exactly what happened. As a result, the referee eventually canceled the goal, gave handball and showed Nikolaidis a yellow card for his violation. Nikolaidis was later honored by the International Olympic Committee for his fair play towards the referee of the final.

== Calendar ==
Round	Date(s)	Fixtures	Clubs	New entries
Group stage	7, 21, 29 August & 13, 27 October 1999	135	56 → 20	54
Additional Round	10 November, 19 December 1999	4	20 → 16	2
Round of 16	12, 13 January 2000	8	16 → 8	none
Quarter-finals	9, 10, 16, 17 February & 1, 2, 8, 9 March 2000	8	8 → 4	none
Semi-finals	5, 12, 19 April 2000	4	4 → 2	none
Final	10 May 2000	1	2 → 1	none

== Group stage ==
The phase was played in a single round-robin format. Each win gained 3 points, each draw gained 1 point, and each loss did not gain any points.

- Marko and A.S. Neapoli qualified to the additional round without matches.

=== Group 1 ===
Pos	Team	Pld	W	D	L	GF	GA	GD	Pts	Qualification	PAO	ION	LEO	PNT	KER	IAL
1	Panathinaikos	5	5	0	0	18	1	+17	15	Round of 16		1–0	4–0	5–1	—	—
2	Ionikos	5	3	0	2	13	5	+8	9	Additional Round	—		—	3–0	3–2	6–0
3	Leonidio	5	3	0	2	6	6	0	9		—	2–1		—	1–0	3–0
4	Panetolikos	5	3	0	2	6	8	−2	9		—	—	1–0		2–0	—
5	Keratsini	5	1	0	4	5	10	−5	3		0–3	—	—	—		3–1
6	Ialysos	5	0	0	5	1	19	−18	0		0–5	—	—	0–2	—	

Source: epo.gr
11 August 1999
13:00 EEST

Keratsini	3–1	Ialysos
Čvorić 27' (o.g.); Koulis 59'; Klinakis 72'	Report (page 1)	Lykos 80'

Municipal Stadium of Keratsini, Keratsini
11 August 1999
13:00 EEST

Ionikos	3–0	Panetolikos
Muchotrigo 9'; Kobayashi 29'; Dos Santos 88'	Report (page 1)

Neapoli Stadium, Nikaia
12 August 1999
13:00 EEST

Panathinaikos	4–0	Leonidio
Liberopoulos 24', 31'; Sypniewski 44'; Kola 83'	Report (page 1)

Leoforos Alexandras Stadium, Ampelokipoi

22 August 1999
13:00 EEST

Ialysos	0–5	Panathinaikos
	Report (page 1)	Olivares 43'; Sigurðsson 70' (pen.), 88'; Mykland 86'; Ipirotis 90'

Municipal Stadium Ekonomideio, Ialysos
22 August 1999
13:00 EEST

Leonidio	2–1	Ionikos
Sakellaropoulos 4'; Spanos 47'	Report (page 2)	Muchotrigo 48'

Leonidio Municipal Stadium, Leonidio
22 August 1999
13:00 EEST

Panetolikos	2–0	Keratsini
Koutoulas 5'; Aggelis 44'	Report (page 2)

Panetolikos Stadium, Agrinio

25 August 1999
13:00 EEST

Ialysos	0–2	Panetolikos
	Report (page 2)	Andreadakis 34'; Stoinović 56'

Municipal Stadium Ekonomideio, Ialysos
25 August 1999
13:00 EEST

Leonidio	1–0	Keratsini
Panagiotakopoulos 89'	Report (page 2)

Leonidio Municipal Stadium, Leonidio
25 August 1999
13:00 EEST

Panathinaikos	1–0	Ionikos
Liberopoulos 42'	Report (page 2)

Leoforos Alexandras Stadium, Ampelokipoi

29 August 1999
13:00 EEST

Panetolikos	1–0	Leonidio
Giakolevic 27'	Report (page 3)

Panetolikos Stadium, Agrinio
28 August 1999
13:00 EEST

Keratsini	0–3	Panathinaikos
	Report (page 3)	Sypniewski 67'; Karagounis 70'; Fyssas 89'

Municipal Stadium of Keratsini, Keratsini
29 August 1999
13:00 EEST

Ionikos	6–0	Ialysos
Ofridopoulos 3'; Dos Santos 30'; Muchotrigo 54', 79'; Kobayashi 69'; Cornelius 85'	Report (page 3)

Neapoli Stadium, Nikaia

13 October 1999
13:00 EEST

Leonidio	3–0	Ialysos
Alexiou 12'; Kalyvas 35'; Panagiotakopoulos 90+2'	Report (page 3)

Leonidio Municipal Stadium, Leonidio
7 October 1999
13:00 EEST

Panathinaikos	5–1	Panetolikos
Sypniewski 23'; Pflipsen 28', 70'; Nasiopoulos 74'; Kiassos 83'	Report (page 3)	Andreadakis 32'

Leoforos Alexandras Stadium, Ampelokipoi
13 October 1999
13:00 EEST

Ionikos	3–2	Keratsini
Muchotrigo 8'; Brewster 23'; Alsaker 54'	Report (page 4)	Koulis 30'; Kritikos 51'

Neapoli Stadium, Nikaia

=== Group 2 ===
Pos	Team	Pld	W	D	L	GF	GA	GD	Pts	Qualification	PAOK	AGE	OLV	VER	POS	PNC
1	PAOK	5	5	0	0	13	0	+13	15	Round of 16		2–0	—	1–0	—	5–0
2	Agersani	5	2	1	2	6	6	0	7	Round of 16	—		1–0	—	3–1	2–2
3	Olympiacos Volos	5	2	1	2	4	5	−1	7		0–2	—		2–1	—	—
4	Veria	5	2	0	3	8	6	+2	6		—	1–0	—		4–0	—
5	Poseidon Michaniona	5	1	1	3	4	11	−7	4		0–3	—	1–1	—		—
6	Panachaiki	5	1	1	3	5	12	−7	4		—	—	0–1	3–2	0–1	

Source: epo.gr
11 August 1999
13:00 EEST

Poseidon Michaniona	1–1	Olympiacos Volos
Kapagiannidis 5'	Report (page 4)	Vlachoudis 25'

Poseidon Neas Michanionas Stadium, Thessaloniki
11 August 1999
13:00 EEST

Panachaiki	3–2	Veria
Vukčević 3', 24'; Kostić 32'	Report (page 4)	Athanasiadis 20'; Tsigiannis 66'

Kostas Davourlis Stadium, Patras
10 August 1999
13:00 EEST

PAOK	2–0	Agersani
Vryzas 40'; Frousos 60'	Report (page 5)

Toumba Stadium, Thessaloniki

22 August 1999
13:00 EEST

Olympiacos Volos	0–2	PAOK
	Report (page 5)	Dollberg 47'; Frantzeskos 81'

Volos Municipal Stadium, Volos
22 August 1999
13:00 EEST

Agersani	2–2	Panachaiki
De Souza 4'; Kourouniotis 89'	Report (page 5)	Jovanović 49'; Vukčević 66'

22 August 1999
13:00 EEST

Veria	4–0	Poseidon Michaniona
Allais 18'; Tsigiannis 56'; Niras 66', 77'	Report (page 2)

Veria Stadium, Veria

25 August 1999
13:00 EEST

Olympiacos Volos	2–1	Veria
Vallianatos 76'; Karkaletsis 90+4'	Report (page 5)	Demirtzoglou 55'

Volos Municipal Stadium, Volos
25 August 1999
13:00 EEST

Agersani	3–1	Poseidon Michaniona
De Souza 8', 33'; Lazarou 87'	Report (page 6)	Josa 53'

25 August 1999
13:00 EEST

PAOK	5–0	Panachaiki
Marangos 11'; Frousos 12'; Frantzeskos 50'; Valencia 75', 90+3'	Report (page 6)

Toumba Stadium, Thessaloniki

29 August 1999
13:00 EEST

Veria	1–0	Agersani
Juaman 72'	Report (page 6)

Veria Stadium, Veria
29 August 1999
13:00 EEST

Poseidon Michaniona	0–3	PAOK
	Report (page 6)	Georgiadis 70', 88'; Frousos 90'

Poseidon Neas Michanionas Stadium, Thessaloniki
29 August 1999
13:00 EEST

Panachaiki	0–1	Olympiacos Volos
	Report (page 6)	Vlachoudis 89'

Kostas Davourlis Stadium, Patras

13 October 1999
13:00 EEST

Agersani	1–0	Olympiacos Volos
Kourouniotis 25'	Report (page 7)

13 October 1999
13:00 EEST

PAOK	1–0	Veria
Frousos 37'	Report (page 7)

Toumba Stadium, Thessaloniki
13 October 1999
13:00 EEST

Panachaiki	0–2	Poseidon Michaniona
	Report (page 7)	Papastergos 9', 28'

Kostas Davourlis Stadium, Patras

=== Group 3 ===
Pos	Team	Pld	W	D	L	GF	GA	GD	Pts	Qualification	OFI	PRO	NIK	AOAN	DOX	ASA
1	OFI	5	4	1	0	10	1	+9	13	Round of 16		—	4–1	2–0	—	3–0
2	Proodeftiki	5	2	3	0	5	2	+3	9	Round of 16	0–0		—	—	1–0	2–0
3	Niki Volos	5	2	1	2	11	8	+3	7		—	1–1		4–0	—	—
4	Agios Nikolaos	5	2	1	2	7	10	−3	7		—	1–1	—		—	2–1
5	Doxa Vyronas	5	1	0	4	3	9	−6	3		0–1	—	0–3	2–4		—
6	Anagennisi Karditsa	5	1	0	4	4	10	−6	3		—	—	3–2	—	0–1	

Source: epo.gr
11 August 1999
13:00 EEST

Niki Volos	4–0	Agios Nikolaos
Fousourakis 41'; Kalpakis 48'; Mavrommatis 77'; Stojanov 90+2'	Report (page 7)

Panthessaliko Stadium, Volos
8 August 1999
13:00 EEST

Proodeftiki	1–0	Doxa Vyronas
Makor 46'	Report (page 8)

Nikaia Municipal Stadium, Nikaia
12 August 1999
13:00 EEST

OFI	3–0	Anagennisi Karditsa
Digozis 39'; Gómez 49', 55'	Report (page 8)

Theodoros Vardinogiannis Stadium, Heraklion

21 August 1999
13:00 EEST

Doxa Vyronas	0–1	OFI
	Report (page 8)	Mitsopoulos 61'

Vyronas National Stadium, Vyronas
22 August 1999
13:00 EEST

Agios Nikolaos	1–1	Proodeftiki
Angelakis 59'	Report(page 8)	Kazantzis 70'

Agios Nikolaos Municipal Stadium, Agios Nikolaos
22 August 1999
13:00 EEST

Anagennisi Karditsa	3–2	Niki Volos
Mitev 22'; Tzatzos 78'; Bafur 90+2'	Report (page 8)	Stojanov 37'; Stojkovski 60'

Municipal Stadium of Karditsa, Karditsa

25 August 1999
13:00 EEST

Agios Nikolaos	2–1	Anagennisi Karditsa
Chorianopoulos 21'; Tzortzis 82'	Report (page 9)	Bafur 56'

Agios Nikolaos Municipal Stadium, Agios Nikolaos
26 August 1999
13:00 EEST

Doxa Vyronas	0–3	Niki Volos
	Report (page 9)	Stojkovski 9'; Fasourakis 62', 88'

Vyronas National Stadium, Vyronas
25 August 1999
13:00 EEST

Proodeftiki	0–0	OFI
	Report (page 9)

Nikaia Municipal Stadium, Nikaia

29 August 1999
13:00 EEST

Anagennisi Karditsa	0–1	Doxa Vyronas
	Report (page 9)	Liaos 79'

Municipal Stadium of Karditsa, Karditsa
29 August 1999
13:00 EEST

Niki Volos	1–1	Proodeftiki
Fasourakis 4'	Report (page 9)	Makor 64'

Panthessaliko Stadium, Volos
28 August 1999
13:00 EEST

OFI	2–0	Agios Nikolaos
Mitić 19'; Tzanetis 79'	Report (page 10)

Theodoros Vardinogiannis Stadium, Heraklion

13 October 1999
13:00 EEST

Doxa Vyronas	2–4	Agios Nikolaos
Liaos 45'; Karydis 35'	Report (page 10)	Kalogerakis 30', 32', 40', 67'

Vyronas National Stadium, Vyronas
13 October 1999
13:00 EEST

Proodeftiki	2–0	Anagennisi Karditsa
Fouskas 48'; Bayazid 73'	Report (page 10)

Nikaia Municipal Stadium, Nikaia
13 October 1999
13:00 EEST

OFI	4–1	Niki Volos
Dedes 38'; Nioplias 60'; Tzanetis 68'; Mauro 84'	Report (page 10)	Mavrommatis 8'

Theodoros Vardinogiannis Stadium, Heraklion

=== Group 4 ===
Pos	Team	Pld	W	D	L	GF	GA	GD	Pts	Qualification	ARIS	PGSS	PNG	APK	KIL	THE
1	Aris	5	3	1	1	11	2	+9	10	Round of 16		—	5–1	0–0	1–0	—
2	Panionios	5	3	1	1	14	8	+6	10	Additional Round	1–0		—	2–2	—	5–0
3	Panegialios	5	2	1	2	9	12	−3	7		—	3–4		2–1	—	—
4	Apollon Kalamarias	5	1	3	1	5	5	0	6		—	—	—		1–0	1–1
5	Kilkisiakos	5	1	2	2	4	5	−1	5		—	3–2	0–0	—		—
6	Thesprotos	5	0	2	3	4	15	−11	2		0–5	—	2–3	—	1–1	

Source: epo.gr
11 August 1999
13:00 EEST

Kilkisiakos	0–0	Panegialios
	Report (page 11)

Municipal Stadium of Kilkis, Kilkis
11 August 1999
13:00 EEST

Panionios	5–0	Thesprotos
Nalitzis 7', 37'; Sapountzis 47'; Pantić 67', 75'	Report (page 11)

Nea Smyrni Stadium, Nea Smyrni
10 August 1999
13:00 EEST

Aris	0–0	Apollon Kalamarias
	Report (page 11)

Aris Stadium, Thessaloniki

21 August 1999
13:00 EEST

Thesprotos	0–5	Aris
	Report (page 11)	M. Christodoulou 3', 26'; Charisteas 56'; Koutsis 76', 83'

Municipal Stadium of Igoumenitsa, Igoumenitsa
21 August 1999
13:00 EEST

Panegialios	3–4	Panionios
Gamelos 32'; Anogiatis 34'; Karapitsos 38' (pen.)	Report (page 11)	Nalitzis 12'; Papadopoulos 42'; Eyidi 68'; Kiourkos 79'

Aigio National Stadium, Aigio
22 August 1999
13:00 EEST

Apollon Kalamarias	1–0	Kilkisiakos
Boulis 68'	Report (page 12)

Kalamaria Stadium, Thessaloniki

25 August 1999
13:00 EEST

Panegialios	2–1	Apollon Kalamarias
Karapitsos 5'; Anogiatis 90+1'	Report (page 12)	Kefalas 75'

Aigio National Stadium, Aigio
25 August 1999
13:00 EEST

Thesprotos	1–1	Kilkisiakos
Dimopoulos 1'	Report (page 12)	Panteliadis 34'

Municipal Stadium of Igoumenitsa, Igoumenitsa
26 August 1999
13:00 EEST

Panionios	1–0	Aris
Kontis 29'	Report (page 12)

Nea Smyrni Stadium, Nea Smyrni

29 August 1999
13:00 EEST

Apollon Kalamarias	1–1	Thesprotos
Boulis 32'	Report (page 13)	Tsakiris 28'

Kalamaria Stadium, Thessaloniki
29 August 1999
13:00 EEST

Kilkisiakos	3–2	Panionios
Marcelo 34'; Konstantinidis 68'; Panteliadis 87'	Report (page 13)	Eyidi 59'; Nalitzis 70'

Municipal Stadium of Kilkis, Kilkis
30 August 1999
13:00 EEST

Aris	5–1	Panegialios
Gluščević 10', 23'; Nagoli 22'; Liolidis 38'; Mantzios 89' (pen.)	Report (page 13)	Anogiatis 79'

Aris Stadium, Thessaloniki

13 October 1999
13:00 EEST

Thesprotos	2–3	Panegialios
Gogolos 3'; Christodoulou 12'	Report (page 13)	Kintis 23'; Lazanas 60'; Balaskas 75'

Municipal Stadium of Igoumenitsa, Igoumenitsa
13 October 1999
13:00 EEST

Panionios	2–2	Apollon Kalamarias
Krčmarević 55'; Palamaras 82'	Report (page 13)	Samlidis 45'; Polyzoidis 85'

Nea Smyrni Stadium, Nea Smyrni
12 October 1999
13:00 EEST

Aris	1–0	Kilkisiakos
Agathokleous 90+2'	Report (page 14)

Aris Stadium, Thessaloniki

=== Group 5 ===
Pos	Team	Pld	W	D	L	GF	GA	GD	Pts	Qualification	ETA	PNI	ATR	KLT	CHL	ETP
1	Ethnikos Asteras	5	4	0	1	13	10	+3	12	Round of 16		4–3	—	—	3–1	4–3
2	Paniliakos	5	3	1	1	15	4	+11	10	Additional Round	—		1–0	5–0	—	6–0
3	Atromitos	5	3	1	1	5	2	+3	10		2–0	—		1–1	—	—
4	Kallithea	5	1	2	2	10	11	−1	5		1–2	—	—		—	7–2
5	Chalkidona	5	0	3	2	6	9	−3	3		—	0–0	0–1	1–1		—
6	Ethnikos Piraeus	5	0	1	4	9	22	−13	1		—	—	0–1	—	4–4	

Source: epo.gr
11 August 1999
13:00 EEST

Ethnikos Asteras	3–1	Chalkidona
Tsalikis 3', 17'; Pavlović 34'	Report (page 14)	Damiris 20'

Michalis Kritikopoulos Stadium, Kaisariani
11 August 1999
13:00 EEST

Paniliakos	6–0	Ethnikos Piraeus
Almanidis 7'; Gonias 16'; Nebegleras 41'; Rosales 55' (pen.); Ziakas 60'; Miktos 78'	Report (page 14)

Pyrgos Stadium, Pyrgos
11 August 1999
13:00 EEST

Atromitos	1–1	Kallithea
Mitsis 86'	Report (page 14)	Cerović 48'

Peristeri Stadium, Peristeri

22 August 1999
13:00 EEST

Kallithea	1–2	Ethnikos Asteras
Cerović 68'	Report (page 15)	Georgopoulos 31'; Frotzos 53'

Grigoris Lambrakis Stadium, Kallithea
22 August 1999
13:00 EEST

Ethnikos Piraeus	0–1	Atromitos
	Report (page 15)	Balogiannis 16'

Grigoris Lambrakis Stadium, Kallithea
22 August 1999
13:00 EEST

Chalkidona	0–0	Paniliakos
	Report (page 15)

Nikaia Municipal Stadium, Nikaia

25 August 1999
13:00 EEST

Kallithea	7–2	Ethnikos Piraeus
Zacharopoulos 8', 27'; Cerović 22', 38', 77'; Korobokis 45'; Savvidis 86'	Report (page 15)	Tsanas 48' (pen.); Papandreou 83'

Grigoris Lambrakis Stadium, Kallithea
25 August 1999
13:00 EEST

Chalkidona	0–1	Atromitos
	Report (page 15)	Stavrou 42'

Nikaia Municipal Stadium, Nikaia
25 August 1999
13:00 EEST

Ethnikos Asteras	4–3	Aris
Pavlović 48', 66' (pen.), 84' (pen.); Svitlica 90+2'	Report (page 16)	Almanidis 18'; Gonias 62', 72' (pen.)

Michalis Kritikopoulos Stadium, Kaisariani

29 August 1999
13:00 EEST

Ethnikos Piraeus	4–4	Chalkidona
Papandreou 5'; Medan 40', 84'; Komiotis 85'	Report (page 16)	Sengos 12', 16'; Sofianos 39'; Sotirchos 90'

Grigoris Lambrakis Stadium, Kallithea
29 August 1999
13:00 EEST

Atromitos	2–0	Ethnikos Asteras
Vahirua 79'; Stavrou 79'	Report (page 16)

Peristeri Stadium, Peristeri
29 August 1999
13:00 EEST

Paniliakos	5–0	Kallithea
Ziakas 1'; Almanidis 61', 68'; Gonias 65'; Koltzos 74'	Report (page 16)

Pyrgos Stadium, Pyrgos

14 October 1999
13:00 EEST

Chalkidona	1–1	Kallithea
Gribilas 63'	Report (page 16)	Savvidis 28'

Nikaia Municipal Stadium, Nikaia
13 October 1999
13:00 EEST

Ethnikos Asteras	4–3	Ethnikos Piraeus
Papathanasiou 23'; Kikidakis 55'; Georgopoulos 79'; Basinas 82'	Report (page 17)	Charalabopoulos 42'; Kartalis 57'; Muratovic 77'

Michalis Kritikopoulos Stadium, Kaisariani
13 October 1999
13:00 EEST

Paniliakos	1–0	Atromitos
Rosales 62'	Report (page 17)

Pyrgos Stadium, Pyrgos

=== Group 6 ===
Pos	Team	Pld	W	D	L	GF	GA	GD	Pts	Qualification	KAV	IRA	AEL	PNS	ETK	KOZ
1	Kavala	5	4	1	0	8	1	+7	13	Additional Round		0–0	—	4–1	1–0	—
2	Iraklis	5	3	2	0	14	4	+10	11	Round of 16	—		3–1	3–1	—	7–1
3	AEL	5	1	2	2	6	7	−1	5		0–1	—		0–0	—	—
4	Panserraikos	5	1	2	2	6	8	−2	5		—	—	—		3–0	1–1
5	Ethnikos Katerini	5	1	1	3	5	8	−3	4		—	1–1	1–3	—		1–1
6	Kozani	5	0	2	3	4	15	−11	2		0–2	—	2–2	—	—	

Source: epo.gr
11 August 1999
13:00 EEST

Kozani	2–2	AEL
Zachariadis 2'; Kaounos 3'	Report (page 17)	Gekas 71'; Kontothanasis 72'

Kozani Stadium, Kozani
11 August 1999
13:00 EEST

Kavala	1–0	Ethnikos Katerini
Kefalas 84'	Report (page 18)

Anthi Karagianni Stadium, Kavala
8 August 1999
13:00 EEST

Iraklis	3–1	Panserraikos
Sebwe 59'; Konstantinou 81'; Velis 85'	Report (page 18)	Angos 74'

Kaftanzoglio Stadium, Thessaloniki

22 August 1999
13:00 EEST

Panserraikos	1–1	Kozani
Tengelidis 44'	Report (page 18)	Symeonidis 57'

Serres Municipal Stadium, Serres
22 August 1999
13:00 EEST

AEL	0–1	Kavala
	Report (page 18)	Kefalas 79'

Alcazar Stadium, Larissa
22 August 1999
13:00 EEST

Ethnikos Katerini	1–1	Iraklis
Papavasiliou 58'	Report (page 18)	Semos 75'

Kalianidis Stadium, Katerini

25 August 1999
13:00 EEST

AEL	0–0	Panserraikos
	Report (page 18)

Alcazar Stadium, Larissa
25 August 1999
13:00 EEST

Ethnikos Katerini	3–0	Kozani
Kalaitzis 4', 24'; Chalimakoudis 44'	Report (page 19)

Kalianidis Stadium, Katerini
26 August 1999
13:00 EEST

Kavala	0–0	Iraklis
	Report (page 19)

Anthi Karagianni Stadium, Kavala

29 August 1999
13:00 EEST

Panserraikos	3–0	Ethnikos Katerini
Tsilibidis 8', 69'; Panagiotidis 75'	Report (page 19)

Serres Municipal Stadium, Serres
29 August 1999
13:00 EEST

Kozani	0–2	Kavala
	Report (page 19)	Koubis 35'; López 77'

Kozani Stadium, Kozani
29 August 1999
13:00 EEST

Iraklis	3–1	AEL
Konstantinou 49'; Semos 53'; Sebwe 80'	Report (page 19)	Nastos 30'

Kaftanzoglio Stadium, Thessaloniki

13 October 1999
13:00 EEST

Ethnikos Katerini	1–3	AEL
Alivanoglou 36'	Report (page 20)	Ivanović 30', 62'; Nastos 90'

Kalianidis Stadium, Katerini
27 October 1999
13:00 EEST

Kavala	4–1	Panserraikos
Nazha 10'; Papageorgiou 45' (o.g.); Kefalas 82'; N'Gotti 90'	Report (page 20)	Tsiblidis

Anthi Karagianni Stadium, Kavala
13 October 1999
13:00 EEST

Iraklis	7–1	Kozani
Sebwe 5', 73', 78'; Debbah 7', 24', 48'; Hagan 81'	Report (page 20)	Patinios 62'

Kaftanzoglio Stadium, Thessaloniki

=== Group 7 ===
Pos	Team	Pld	W	D	L	GF	GA	GD	Pts	Qualification	OLY	PAS	XAN	NAO	EDE	AKV
1	Olympiacos	5	5	0	0	16	2	+14	15	Additional Round		2–1	—	5–0	—	2–0
2	PAS Giannina	5	4	0	1	14	3	+11	12	Additional Round	—		2–0	5–0	—	—
3	Skoda Xanthi	5	2	0	3	10	9	+1	6		1–5	—		3–0	5–0	—
4	Naoussa	5	2	0	3	4	14	−10	6		—	—	—		3–1	1–0
5	Edessaikos	5	1	0	4	4	14	−10	3		0–2	1–3	—	—		2–1
6	Apollon Krya Vrysi	5	1	0	4	3	9	−6	3		—	0–3	2–1	—	—	

Source: epo.gr
11 August 1999
13:00 EEST

Skoda Xanthi	5–0	Edessaikos
Dikoumé 17'; Mitkidis 24' (o.g.); Geladaris 28'; Damianos 30'; Ba 61'	Report (page 20)

A.O. Xanthi Stadium, Xanthi
11 August 1999
13:00 EEST

Apollon Krya Vrysi	0–3	PAS Giannina
	Report (page 21)	Pano 69'; Kormaris 80'; Garozis 90'

Ioannis Tserkezidis Stadium, Krya Vrysi
11 August 1999
13:00 EEST

Olympiacos	5–0	Naoussa
Giovanni 28', 33'; Ofori-Quaye 49'; Giannakopoulos 68'; Gogić 85'	Report (page 21)

Olympic Stadium, Marousi
Referee: Georgios Tsagarakis (Chania)

22 August 1999
13:00 EEST

Naoussa	1–0	Apollon Krya Vrysi
Karaliopoulos 16'	Report (page 21)

Municipal Stadium of Naousa, Naoussa
8 September 1999
13:00 EEST

Edessaikos	0–2	Olympiacos
	Report (page 21)	Karapialis 37'; Sfakianakis 90'

Municipal Stadium of Edessa, Edessa
Referee: Malamas Tevekelis (Thessaloniki)
27 October 1999
13:00 EEST

PAS Giannina	2–0	Skoda Xanthi
Kakos 26'; Bellaj 39'	Report (page 21)

Zosimades Stadium, Ioannina

25 August 1999
13:00 EEST

PAS Giannina	5–0	Naoussa
Kormaris 39', 58'; Bellaj 66', 31'; Giotsas 89'	Report (page 22)

Zosimades Stadium, Ioannina
25 August 1999
13:00 EEST

Edessaikos	2–1	Apollon Krya Vrysi
Samarov 25'; Grigoriadis 47'	Report (page 22)	Pramatarov 65'

Municipal Stadium of Edessa, Edessa
26 August 1999
13:00 EEST

Skoda Xanthi	1–5	Olympiacos
Kyparissis 90+2'	Report (page 22)	Amanatidis 32'; Giannakopoulos 35'; Sfakianakis 57'; Gogić 79'; Alexandris 84'

A.O. Xanthi Stadium, Xanthi
Attendance: 2,749
Referee: Kyros Vassaras (Thessaloniki)

29 August 1999
13:00 EEST

Naoussa	3–1	Edessaikos
Andreadis 35', 57'; Chandouris 41'	Report (page 22)	Vlisnakis 66'

Municipal Stadium of Naousa, Naoussa
29 August 1999
13:00 EEST

Apollon Krya Vrysi	2–1	Skoda Xanthi
Antoniadis 3'; Tsatsos 78'	Report (page 22)	Kyparissis 66'

Ioannis Tserkezidis Stadium, Krya Vrysi
29 August 1999
13:00 EEST

Olympiacos	2–1	PAS Giannina
Đorđević 7'; Giovanni 45'	Report (page 23)	Sentementes 77'

Olympic Stadium, Marousi
Attendance: 6,097
Referee: Spyros Papadakos (Laconia)

13 October 1999
13:00 EEST

Edessaikos	1–3	PAS Giannina
Albanis 90+1'	Report (page 23)	Gittas 35'; Mendes 65', 85'

Municipal Stadium of Edessa, Edessa
13 October 1999
13:00 EEST

Skoda Xanthi	3–0	Naoussa
Prittas 8'; Ba 35'; Konate 83'	Report (page 23)

A.O. Xanthi Stadium, Xanthi
13 October 1999
13:00 EEST

Olympiacos	2–0	Apollon Krya Vrysi
Mavrogenidis 22'; Papadopoulos 40' (o.g.)	Report (page 23)

Olympic Stadium, Marousi
Referee: Giorgos Kasnaferis (Athens)

=== Group 8 ===
Pos	Team	Pld	W	D	L	GF	GA	GD	Pts	Qualification	AEK	TRI	EGA	ATH	AKR	KAR
1	AEK Athens	5	5	0	0	20	3	+17	15	Round of 16		—	6–1	3–0	3–0	—
2	Trikala	5	4	0	1	9	5	+4	12	Round of 16	1–2		1–0	—	—	2–0
3	Egaleo	5	2	0	3	8	10	−2	6		—	—		—	4–1	2–0
4	Athinaikos	5	1	2	2	6	9	−3	5		—	2–3	2–1		—	—
5	Akratitos	5	1	1	3	5	11	−6	4		—	1–2	—	1–1		—
6	A.O.Karditsa	5	0	1	4	3	13	−10	1		1–6	—	—	1–1	1–2	

Source: epo.gr
11 August 1999
13:00 EEST

Akratitos	1–1	Athinaikos
Papadopoulos 56'	Report (page 24)	Giannakidis 17'

Ano Liosia Municipal Stadium, Ano Liosia
7 August 1999
13:00 EEST

Trikala	2–0	A.O.Karditsa
Chloros 26', 34'	Report (page 24)

Trikala Municipal Stadium, Trikala
7 August 1999
19:45 EEST

AEK Athens	6–1	Egaleo
Bjeković 20'; Ćirić 22', 58' (pen.), 75'; Nikolaidis 46'; Markos 90'	Report (page 24)	Makris 55'

Nikos Goumas Stadium, Nea Filadelfeia
Attendance: 2,797
Referee: Giorgos Fasolis (Athens)

21 August 1999
13:00 EEST

A.O. Karditsa	1–6	AEK Athens
Letsios 76'	Report (page 24)	Petrić 15'; Markos 24'; Bountolos 37' (o.g.); Bjeković 41'; Ćirić 78', 87'

Municipal Stadium of Karditsa, Karditsa
Referee: Paraskevas Chelis (Kavala)
22 August 1999
13:00 EEST

Egaleo	4–1	Akratitos
Athanasiadis 6'; Manousakis 15'; Rafailidis 74'; Dertinis 87'	Report (page 24)	Koliakos 25'

Stavros Mavrothalassitis Stadium, Aigaleo
22 August 1999
13:00 EEST

Athinaikos	2–3	Trikala
Ostrowski 29'; Basala 75'	Report (page 25)	Kotsios 43'; Mouratidis 52'; Diach 58'

Vyronas National Stadium, Vyronas

25 August 1999
13:00 EEST

Athinaikos	2–1	Egaleo
Trichias 2', 38'	Report (page 25)	Katsaros 40'

Vyronas National Stadium, Vyronas
25 August 1999
13:00 EEST

A.O. Karditsa	1–2	Akratitos
Letsios 76'	Report (page 25)	Moustakas 25', 90'

Municipal Stadium of Karditsa, Karditsa
27 October 1999
18:15 EEST

Trikala	1–2	AEK Athens
Papasteriadis 32'	Report (page 25)	Kopitsis 84' (pen.); Markos 89'

Trikala Municipal Stadium, Trikala
Attendance: 1,877
Referee: Dimitris Pontikis (Thessaloniki)

29 August 1999
13:00 EEST

Egaleo	2–0	A.O. Karditsa
G. Skopelitis 14'; Makris 75'	Report (page 24)

Stavros Mavrothalassitis Stadium, Aigaleo
29 August 1999
13:00 EEST

Akratitos	1–2	Trikala
Koliakos 19'	Report (page 26)	Mouratidis 36'; Diach 78'

Ano Liosia Municipal Stadium, Ano Liosia
29 August 1999
13:00 EEST

AEK Athens	3–0	Athinaikos
Nikolaidis 5', 30'; Konstantinidis 57'	Report (page 26)

Nikos Goumas Stadium, Nea Filadelfeia
Referee: Giorgos Douros (Corinthia)

13 October 1999
13:00 EEST

A.O. Karditsa	1–1	Athinaikos
Sakelaridis 47'	Report (page 26)	Giannakidis 74'

Municipal Stadium of Karditsa, Karditsa
13 October 1999
13:00 EEST

Trikala	1–0	Egaleo
Spyrakos 32'	Report (page 26)

Trikala Municipal Stadium, Trikala
13 October 1999
20:00 EEST

AEK Athens	3–0	Akratitos
Konstantinidis 40'; Lakis 60'; Maladenis 79'	Report (page 26)

Karaiskakis Stadium, Piraeus
Attendance: 364
Referee: Kostas Finokaliotis (Athens)

=== Group 9 ===
Pos	Team	Pld	W	D	L	GF	GA	GD	Pts	Qualification	KLM	NFP	APA	PNE	LYK	PIE
1	Kalamata	5	4	0	1	10	2	+8	12	Round of 16		4–0	1–2	—	—	1–0
2	Nafpaktiakos Asteras	5	3	1	1	9	8	+1	10	Round of 16	—		2–1	3–1	1–1	—
3	Apollon Athens	5	3	1	1	7	5	+2	10		—	—		2–2	1–0	1–0
4	Panelefsiniakos	5	1	2	2	6	7	−1	5		0–1	—	—		—	1–1
5	ILTEX Lykoi	5	1	1	3	5	8	−3	4		0–2	—	—	0–2		—
6	Pierikos	5	0	1	4	4	11	−7	1		—	1–3	—	—	2–4	

Source: epo.gr
11 August 1999
13:00 EEST

Apollon Athens	1–0	Pierikos
Bwelle 90+3'	Report (page 27)

Rizoupoli Stadium, Rizoupoli
11 August 1999
13:00 EEST

Kalamata	4–0	Nafpaktiakos Asteras
Brachamis 4'; Soares 49', 58'; Kappos 86'	Report (page 27)

Kalamata Municipal Stadium, Kalamata
11 August 1999
13:00 EEST

ILTEX Lykoi	0–2	Panelefsiniakos
	Report (page 27)	Tsolakis 20'; Moutas 60'

Stelios Iliadis Stadium, Thessaloniki

21 August 1999
13:00 EEST

Pierikos	2–4	ILTEX Lykoi
Kyparissis 52', 90'	Report (page 27)	Fidanis 6'; Krunić 66'; Karaziotis 78'; Klokidis 79'

Katerini Stadium, Katerini
22 August 1999
13:00 EEST

Nafpaktiakos Asteras	2–1	Apollon Athens
Stylos 36' (pen.), 44'	Report (page 28)	Labriakos 51' (pen.)

Papacharalambeio Ethniko Stadio, Nafpaktos
23 August 1999
13:00 EEST

Panelefsiniakos	0–1	Kalamata
	Report (page 28)	Bullen 61'

Municipal Stadium of Elefsina, Elefsina

26 August 1999
13:00 EEST

Panelefsiniakos	1–1	Pierikos
Boutas 80'	Report (page 28)	Dosis 84'

Municipal Stadium of Elefsina, Elefsina
25 August 1999
13:00 EEST

Nafpaktiakos Asteras	1–1	ILTEX Lykoi
Stylos 38'	Report (page 28)	Karaziotis 30'

Papacharalambeio Ethniko Stadio, Nafpaktos
25 August 1999
13:00 EEST

Kalamata	1–2	Apollon Athens
Kalantzis 90+1'	Report (page 28)	Labriakos 26' (pen.), 47'

Kalamata Municipal Stadium, Kalamata

29 August 1999
13:00 EEST

Pierikos	1–3	Nafpaktiakos Asteras
Pembes 44'	Report (page 29)	Marinos 55'; Stylos 67'; Tsimopoulos 71' (o.g.)

Katerini Stadium, Katerini
29 August 1999
13:00 EEST

ILTEX Lykoi	0–2	Kalamata
	Report (page 29)	Soares 24'; Boateng 79'

Stelios Iliadis Stadium, Thessaloniki
29 August 1999
13:00 EEST

Apollon Athens	2–2	Panelefsiniakos
Anastasakos 85'; Papadimitriou 90+2'	Report (page 29)	Vaitsis 73'; Djurjev 90+3'

Rizoupoli Stadium, Rizoupoli

13 October 1999
13:00 EEST

Nafpaktiakos Asteras	3–1	Panelefsiniakos
Stylos 38'; Loukopoulos 46', 61'	Report (page 29)	Papaefthimiou 29'

Papacharalambeio Ethniko Stadio, Nafpaktos
13 October 1999
13:00 EEST

Kalamata	2–0	Pierikos
Soares 43'; Alves 49'	Report (page 29)

Kalamata Municipal Stadium, Kalamata
13 October 1999
13:00 EEST

Apollon Athens	1–0	ILTEX Lykoi
Dalipi 29'	Report (page 30)

Rizoupoli Stadium, Rizoupoli

== Knockout phase ==
Each tie in the knockout phase, apart from the first three rounds and the final, was played over two legs, with each team playing one leg at home. The team that scored more goals on aggregate over the two legs advanced to the next round. If the aggregate score was level, the away goals rule was applied, i.e. the team that scored more goals away from home over the two legs advanced. If away goals were also equal, then extra time was played. The away goals rule was again applied after extra time, i.e. if there were goals scored during extra time and the aggregate score was still level, the visiting team advanced by virtue of more away goals scored. If no goals were scored during extra time, the winners were decided by a penalty shoot-out. In the first three rounds and the final, which were played as a single match, if the score was level at the end of normal time, extra time was played, followed by a penalty shoot-out if the score was still level.
The mechanism of the draws for each round is as follows:

- There are no seedings, and teams from the same group can be drawn against each other.

== Additional round ==
=== Summary ===
Team 1	Agg.	Team 2	1st leg	2nd leg
A.S. Neapoli	2–1	PAS Giannina		
Paniliakos	0–1	Olympiacos		
Kavala	1–2	Panionios		
Ionikos	4–1	Marko		

=== Matches ===
10 November 1999
13:00 EET

A.S. Neapoli	2–1	PAS Giannina
Kapriniotis 21'; Lombas 79'	Report (page 30)	Feutchine 47'

Neapoli Stadium, Nikaia

10 November 1999
17:00 EET

Kavala	1–2	Panionios
Athanasiadis 18'	Report (page 30)	Krčmarević 35'; Nalitzis 59'

Anthi Karagianni Stadium, Kavala

19 December 1999
17:00 EET

Paniliakos	0–1	Olympiacos
	Report (page 30)	Poursanidis 49'

Pyrgos Stadium, Pyrgos
Attendance: 9,000
Referee: Dimitris Kalivas (Boeotia)

10 November 1999
13:00 EET

Ionikos	4–1	Marko
Alsaker 47', 64'; Kobayashi 50'; Brewster 65'	Report (page 30-31)	Skarmoutsos 22'

Neapoli Stadium, Nikaia

== Bracket ==
Round of 16
AEK Athens	6
Trikala	0
Olympiacos	2
PAOK	1
Aris (p)	1(4)
Panathinaikos	1(2)
Ethnikos Asteras	3(4)
Panionios (p)	3(5)
OFI	3
Agersani	0
Kalamata	3
Proodeftiki	0
Ionikos	4
Iraklis	2
Nafpaktiakos Asteras	1
A.S. Neapoli	0

Quarter-finals
Olympiacos	1	0	1
AEK Athens	1	3	4
Aris	0	0	0
Panionios	0	2	2
OFI	1	0	1
Kalamata	0	3	3
Ionikos	8	1	9
Nafpaktiakos Asteras	0	2	2

Semi-finals
AEK Athens	4	1	5
Panionios	1	2	3
Kalamata	0	2	2
Ionikos	2	4	6

Final
AEK Athens	3
Ionikos	0

== Round of 16 ==
=== Summary ===
Team 1	Agg.	Team 2	1st leg	2nd leg
AEK Athens	6–0	Trikala		
Nafpaktiakos Asteras	1–0	A.S. Neapoli		
OFI	3–0	Agersani		
Ethnikos Asteras	3–3 (4–5 p)	Panionios		
Kalamata	3–0	Proodeftiki		
Ionikos	4–2	Iraklis		
Olympiacos	2–1	PAOK		
Aris	1–1 (4–2 p)	Panathinaikos		

=== Matches ===
12 January 2000
16:30 EET

AEK Athens	6–0	Trikala
Maladenis 13', 24'; Nikolaidis 19', 82', 89'; Markos 21'	Report (page 31)

Nikos Goumas Stadium, Nea Filadelfeia
Attendance: 1,400
Referee: Dimitris Kalyvas (Boeotia)

12 January 2000
13:00 EET

Nafpaktiakos Asteras	1–0	A.S. Neapoli
Kakoglou 18'	Report (page 31)

Papacharalambeio Ethniko Stadio, Nafpaktos

12 January 2000
13:00 EET

OFI	3–0	Agersani
Dedes 22'; Taument 33'; Nioplias 90'	Report (page 31)

Theodoros Vardinogiannis Stadium, Heraklion

12 January 2000
14:30 EET

Ethnikos Asteras	3–3 (a.e.t.)	Panionios
Missé-Missé 46', 71'; Xanthis 89'	Report (page 31-32)	Pantić 17', 76'; Nalitzis 27'
Penalties
Missé-Missé (penalty missed); Tešović (penalty scored); Lagos (penalty missed); Pavlović (penalty scored); Basinas (penalty scored); Xanthis (penalty scored); Triantafyllou (penalty missed)	4–5	(penalty missed) Krčmarević; (penalty scored) Maqueda; (penalty scored) Nalitzis; (penalty missed) Tzivelekis; (penalty scored) Sapountzis; (penalty scored) Mitsiopoulos; (penalty scored) Chasiotis

Michalis Kritikopoulos Stadium, Kaisariani

12 January 2000
14:30 EET

Kalamata	3–0	Proodeftiki
Bachramis 11'; Hilton 45'; Mikes 63'	Report (page 32)

Kalamata Municipal Stadium, Kalamata

12 January 2000
14:30 EET

Ionikos	4–2	Iraklis
Roberts 47'; Brewster 77', 83'; Kobayashi 88'	Report (page 32)	Konstantinou 45'; Sebwe 59'

Neapoli Stadium, Nikaia

12 January 2000
18:30 EET

Olympiacos	2–1	PAOK
Alexandris 2'; Giannakopoulos 54'	Report (page 32)	Frousos 19'

Olympic Stadium, Marousi
Attendance: 17,317
Referee: Georgios Tsagarakis (Chania)

13 January 2000
17:30 EET

Aris	1–1 (a.e.t.)	Panathinaikos
Andrioli 53'	Report (page 32)	Karagounis 42'
Penalties
Papadopoulos (penalty scored); Charisteas (penalty scored); Katsiaros (penalty missed); Kyzeridis (penalty scored); Mantzios (penalty scored)	4–2	(penalty missed) Karagounis; (penalty scored) Vokolos; (penalty scored) Sigurðsson; (penalty missed) Olivares

Aris Stadium, Thessaloniki

== Quarter-finals ==
=== Summary ===
Team 1	Agg.	Team 2	1st leg	2nd leg
Ionikos	9–2	Nafpaktiakos Asteras	8–0	1–2
Aris	0–2	Panionios	0–0	0–2
Olympiacos	1–4	AEK Athens	1–1	0–3
OFI	1–3	Kalamata	1–0	0–3

=== Matches ===
9 February 2000
17:00 EET

Ionikos	8–0	Nafpaktiakos Asteras
Kobayashi 3', 78'; Brewster 15'; Haugland 47', 84', 88'; Ofrydopoulos 71'; Afentoulidis 90'	Report (page 32-33)

Neapoli Stadium, Nikaia
1 March 2000
16:00 EET

Nafpaktiakos Asteras	2–1	Ionikos
Karageorgos 57'; Papapostolou 74'	Report (page 33)	Afentoulidis 80'

Papacharalambeio Ethniko Stadio, Nafpaktos

Ionikos won 9–2 on aggregate.

10 April 2000
18:00 EET

Aris	0–0	Panionios
	Report (page 33)

Aris Stadium, Thessaloniki
2 March 2000
17:00 EET

Panionios	2–0	Aris
Krčmarević 13'; Ioannou 42'	Report (page 33-34)

Nea Smyrni Stadium, Nea Smyrni

Panionios won 2–0 on aggregate.

6 February 2000
18:30 EET

Olympiacos	1–1	AEK Athens
Alexandris 75'	Report (page 33)	Lakis 32'

Olympic Stadium, Marousi
Referee: Dimitris Kalyvas (Boeotia)
8 March 2000
18:30 EET

AEK Athens	3–0	Olympiacos
Nikolaidis 27'; Kopitsis 31'; Petkov 48'	Report (page 34)

Nikos Goumas Stadium, Nea Filadelfeia
Attendance: 14,400
Referee: Kyros Vassaras (Thessaloniki)

AEK Athens won 4–1 on aggregate.

17 February 2000
17:00 EET

OFI	1–0	Kalamata
Taument 83'	Report (page 33)

Theodoros Vardinogiannis Stadium, Heraklion
9 March 2000
16:00 EET

Kalamata	3–0	OFI
Troupkos 45' (pen.), 74'; Soares 80'	Report (page 34)

Kalamata Municipal Stadium, Kalamata

Kalamata won 3–1 on aggregate.

== Semi-finals ==
=== Summary ===
Team 1	Agg.	Team 2	1st leg	2nd leg
AEK Athens	5–3	Panionios	4–1	1–2
Kalamata	2–6	Ionikos	0–2	2–4

=== Matches ===
5 April 2000
19:30 EEST

AEK Athens	4–1	Panionios
Nikolaidis 24' (pen.), 45', 53'; Lakis 35'	Report (page 34)	Sapountzis 87' (pen.)

Nikos Goumas Stadium, Nea Filadelfeia
Attendance: 7,976
Referee: Giorgos Fasolis (Athens)
19 April 2000
19:30 EEST

Panionios	2–1	AEK Athens
Kafalis 74'; Krčmarević 90'	Report (page 35)	Ćirić 22'

Nea Smyrni Stadium, Nea Smyrni
Referee: Giorgos Kasnaferis (Athens)

AEK Athens won 5–3 on aggregate.

5 April 2000
16:30 EEST

Kalamata	0–2	Ionikos
	Report (page 34)	Muchotrigo 83'; Roberts 90+3'

Kalamata Municipal Stadium, Kalamata
19 April 2000
17:00 EEST

Ionikos	4–2	Kalamata
Xanthopoulos 10'; Muchotrigo 49'; Tsiavdaris 90+1'; Afash 90+2'	Report (page 35)	Simons 57'; Kappos 83'

Neapoli Stadium, Nikaia

Ionikos won 6–2 on aggregate.

== Final ==
10 May 2000
20:00 EEST

AEK Athens	3–0	Ionikos
Nikolaidis 37'; Petkov 76'; Maladenis 81'	Report (page 35)

Olympic Stadium, Marousi
Attendance: 25,471
Referee: Giorgos Douros (Corinthia)

== Top scorers ==
Rank	Player	Club	Goals
1	(Greece) Demis Nikolaidis	AEK Athens	11
2	(Peru) Darío Muchotrigo	Ionikos	7
3	(Federal Republic of Yugoslavia) Dragan Ćirić	AEK Athens	6
3	(Liberia) Kelvin Sebwe	Iraklis	6
3	(Greece) Dimitrios Nalitzis	Panionios	6
3	(Brazil) Paulinho Kobayashi	Ionikos	6
7	(Federal Republic of Yugoslavia) Srđan Cerović	Kallithea	5
7	(Greece) Apostolos Stylos	Nafpaktiakos Asteras	5
7	(Greece) Nikolaos Frousos	PAOK	5
7	(Scotland) Craig Brewster	Ionikos	5
7	(Brazil) Alessandro Soares	Kalamata	5
