= 1998–99 Greek Football Cup =

1998–99 Greek Cup
Tournament details
- Country: Greece
- Teams: 60

Final positions
- Champions: Olympiacos (20th title)
- Runners-up: Panathinaikos

Tournament statistics
- Matches played: 65
- Goals scored: 202 (3.11 per match)
- Top goal scorer(s): Krzysztof Warzycha (5 goals)

The 1998–99 Greek Football Cup was the 57th edition of the Greek Football Cup. Olympiacos defeated Panathinaikos in the final on 5 May 1999.

== Tournament details ==
In total, 60 teams participated: 18 from Alpha Ethniki, 18 from Beta, and 24 from Gamma. The competition was held over six rounds, included the final. The first three rounds were single elimination matches. AEK Athens and PAOK, both of the Alpha Ethniki, were eliminated by lower division teams Poseidon Michaniona and Panserraikos respectively. As is typically seen in this tournament, half of the eight quarter-final teams came from Beta Ethniki. They were Kalamata, Panserraikos, Athinaikos and ILTEX Lykoi.

The final was contested in Athens at Olympic Stadium on 5 May 1999, by the eternal enemies, Olympiacos and Panathinaikos. They had last met in the Greek Cup Final in 1992–93. Panathinaikos had earlier eliminated Cup holders Panionios in the first round while Olympiacos had eliminated Ionikos by an impressive 4–7 score in the third round. Olympiacos won 2–0 and achieved their 20th Cup conquest. With the victory, Olympiacos achieved the Double for the first time in 18 years. With the Cup final loss, Panathinaikos became the first team to lose the Cup final three times in a row.

== Calendar ==
Round	Date(s)	Fixtures	Clubs	New entries
First Round	8–12 November 1998	30	60 → 30	60
Second Round	16, 17 December 1998	14	30 → 16	none
Round of 16	12–14 January 1999	8	16 → 8	none
Quarter-finals	27 January & 17, 18 February 1999	8	8 → 4	none
Semi-finals	6–14 April 1999	4	4 → 2	none
Final	5 May 1999	1	2 → 1	none

== Knockout phase ==
Each tie in the knockout phase, apart from the first three rounds and the final, was played over two legs, with each team playing one leg at home. The team that scored more goals on aggregate over the two legs advanced to the next round. If the aggregate score was level, the away goals rule was applied, i.e. the team that scored more goals away from home over the two legs advanced. If away goals were also equal, then extra time was played. The away goals rule was again applied after extra time, i.e. if there were goals scored during extra time and the aggregate score was still level, the visiting team advanced by virtue of more away goals scored. If no goals were scored during extra time, the winners were decided by a penalty shoot-out. In the first three rounds and the final, which were played as a single match, if the score was level at the end of normal time, extra time was played, followed by a penalty shoot-out if the score was still level.
The mechanism of the draws for each round is as follows:

- There are no seedings, and teams from the same group can be drawn against each other.

== First round ==
=== Summary ===
Team 1	Score	Team 2
Paniliakos	6–1	Agersani
Apollon Athens	1–2	Kozani
Marko	6–2	Apollon Kalamarias
Ethnikos Asteras	1–2	Aiolikos
EAR	2–1	Kilkisiakos
Aetos Skydra	0–5	PAOK
Anagennisi Karditsa	4–2	Apollon Krya Vrysi
Panachaiki	2–0	Veria
A.O. Karditsa	4–0	Levadiakos
Agios Nikolaos	0–0 (1–4 p)	Panegialios
ILTEX Lykoi	2–0	Achaiki
Skoda Xanthi	2–0	Kallithea
Niki Volos	1–2 (a.e.t.)	Ethnikos Piraeus
Athinaikos	2–1	Kastoria
AEL	3–0	Proodeftiki
Ampelokipoi Thessaloniki	3–1	Doxa Drama
Iraklis	4–1	Nafpaktiakos Asteras
Panserraikos	2–1 (a.e.t.)	PAS Giannina
Naoussa	0–2	Aris
Panetolikos	2–1	Edessaikos
Panargiakos	1–0	Trikala
Atromitos	0–1	Kavala
Panelefsiniakos	5–0	Preveza
Ialysos	1–0	Keratsini
Pierikos	0–1 (a.e.t.)	Kalamata
Panionios	1–2 (a.e.t.)	Panathinaikos
Olympiacos	4–2	Egaleo
Olympiacos Volos	1–1 (3–4 p)	Ionikos
Doxa Vyronas	1–3	OFI
Poseidon Michaniona	1–0	AEK Athens

=== Matches ===
11 November 1998
13:00 EET

Paniliakos	6–1	Agersani
Sapanis 10', 30'; Roger 38'; Moschogiannis 48'; Jasiński 53' (pen.); Giannakidis 85'	Report (page 26)	Papadopoulos 38'

Pyrgos Stadium, Pyrgos

11 November 1998
13:00 EET

Apollon Athens	1–2	Kozani
Papadimitriou 82'	Report (page 26)	Argyriou 30'; Manda 33'

Rizoupoli Stadium, Rizoupoli

11 November 1998
13:00 EET

Marko	6–2	Apollon Kalamarias
Kefaloukos 7', 59', 61', 75'; Ballis 30', 34'	Report (page 26)	Samlidis 51' (pen.); Inebolidis 83'

Municipal Stadium of Markopoulo, Markopoulo

11 November 1998
13:00 EET

Ethnikos Asteras	1–2	Aiolikos
Zacharopoulos 13'	Report (page 26)	Petrou 40'; Tsifoutis 78'

Michalis Kritikopoulos Stadium, Kaisariani

11 November 1998
13:00 EET

EAR	2–1	Kilkisiakos
Antonas 47'; Daluz 73'	Report (page 26)	Soultanidis 67'

Sochora Stadium, Rethymno

11 November 1998
13:00 EET

Aetos Skydra	0–5	PAOK
	Report (page 26)	Cominges 3', 45'; Kyriakidis 21', 70'; Koulakiotis 88'

Skydra Municipal Ground, Skydra

8 November 1998
13:00 EET

Anagennisi Karditsa	4–2	Apollon Krya Vrysi
F. Papadopoulos 19'; Koutsopoulos 46'; Eyidi 74', 90'	Report (page 26)	Tsatsos 14'; Katsaros 60'

Municipal Stadium of Karditsa, Karditsa

11 November 1998
13:00 EET

Panachaiki	2–0	Veria
D. Jovanović 14' (pen.); Vaitsis 90'	Report (page 26)

Kostas Davourlis Stadium, Patras

11 November 1998
13:00 EET

A.O. Karditsa	4–0	Levadiakos
Zagos 26'; Nedeljković 41', 53'; Daraglitsas 73'	Report (page 27)

Municipal Stadium of Karditsa, Karditsa

11 November 1998
13:00 EET

Agios Nikolaos	0–0 (a.e.t.)	Panegialios
	Report (page 27)
Penalties
	1–4

Agios Nikolaos Municipal Stadium, Agios Nikolaos

11 November 1998
13:00 EET

ILTEX Lykoi	2–0	Achaiki
Cerović 21'; P. Dimitriadis 53'	Report (page 27)

Stelios Iliadis Stadium, Thessaloniki

11 November 1998
13:00 EET

Skoda Xanthi	2–0	Kallithea
Vilanakis 12'; Tengelidis 48'	Report (page 27)

Skoda Xanthi Arena, Xanthi

11 November 1998
13:00 EET

Niki Volos	1–2 (a.e.t.)	Ethnikos Piraeus
Letsios 62'	Report (page 27)	Macheras 90'; Vitevis 105'

Panthessaliko Stadium, Volos

11 November 1998
13:00 EET

Athinaikos	2–1	Kastoria
Theodoropoulos 76'; Ostrowski 89'	Report (page 27)	Litskas 90'

Vyronas National Stadium, Vyronas

11 November 1998
13:00 EET

AEL	3–0	Proodeftiki
Polyzoidis 9', 14'; Taxiarchis 48'	Report (pages 29-30)

Alcazar Stadium, Larissa
Attendance: 2,200
Referee: Giorgos Kasnaferis (Athens)

11 November 1998
13:00 EET

Ampelokipoi Thessaloniki	3–1	Doxa Drama
Dartzalis 76'; Athanasiadis 86', 90'	Report (page 27)	Tavlaridis 81'

Ampelokipoi Municipal Stadium, Thessaloniki

11 November 1998
13:00 EET

Iraklis	4–1	Nafpaktiakos Asteras
I. Sapanis 7', 55'; Jovanović 65'; Dimitriadis 72'	Report (page 27)	Kepentzis 59'

Kaftanzoglio Stadium, Thessaloniki

11 November 1998
13:00 EET

Panserraikos	2–1 (a.e.t.)	PAS Giannina
Angos 94' (pen.); Valvis 100'	Report (page 27)	Medan 92' (pen.)

Serres Municipal Stadium, Serres

11 November 1998
13:00 EET

Naoussa	0–2	Aris
	Report (page 27)	Mantzios 26' (pen.); Dalkidis 87'

Municipal Stadium of Naousa, Naoussa

11 November 1998
13:00 EET

Panetolikos	2–1	Edessaikos
Vlachos 47'; Sideris 90'	Report (page 27)	Christodoulopoulos 1' (pen.)

Panetolikos Stadium, Agrinio

11 November 1998
13:00 EET

Panargiakos	1–0	Trikala
Farmakas 67' (pen.)	Report (page 27)

Argos Municipal Stadium, Argos

11 November 1998
13:00 EET

Atromitos	0–1	Kavala
	Report (page 27)	Moutas 82'

Peristeri Stadium, Peristeri

11 November 1998
13:00 EET

Panelefsiniakos	5–0	Preveza
Koutsis 15'; Podaras 40'; Kaklamanos 68'; Gilekas 82'; Kalykas 84'	Report (page 27)

Municipal Stadium of Elefsina, Elefsina

11 November 1998
13:00 EET

Ialysos	1–0	Keratsini
Djurdjev 2'	Report (page 27)

Municipal Stadium Ekonomideio, Ialysos

11 November 1998
13:00 EET

Pierikos	0–1 (a.e.t.)	Kalamata
	Report (page 27)	Baffour 100'

Katerini Stadium, Katerini

11 November 1998
19:45 EET

Panionios	1–2 (a.e.t.)	Panathinaikos
Robins 22'	Report (page 29)	Warzycha 19'; Liberopoulos 111'

Nea Smyrni Stadium, Nea Smyrni
Attendance: 1,664
Referee: Georgios Psychomanis (Athens)

12 November 1998
13:00 EET

Olympiacos	4–2	Egaleo
Giannakopoulos 15'; Antzas 20', 21'; Đorđević 60'	Report (pages 27-28)	Katsaros 15', 41'

Olympic Stadium, Marousi
Attendance: 1,851
Referee: Thanasis Briakos (Epirus)

12 November 1998
13:00 EET

Olympiacos Volos	1–1 (a.e.t.)	Ionikos
Koutsokostas 89'	Report (page 28)	Frousos 86' (pen.)
Penalties
Mouratidis (penalty scored); Denelavas (penalty scored); Tsokatsidis (penalty scored); Vallianatos (penalty missed); Makris (penalty missed)	3–4	(penalty scored) Daraklitsas; (penalty scored) Staboulis; (penalty scored) Frousos; (penalty scored) Pangouras

Volos Municipal Stadium, Volos
Attendance: 1,000
Referee: Christos Daglis (Macedonia)

12 November 1998
13:00 EET

Doxa Vyronas	1–3	OFI
Čvorić 58'	Report (page 27)	Anastasiou 54'; M. Diarra 64'; Papagiannakis 90'

Vyronas National Stadium, Vyronas

10 November 1998
14:30 EET

Poseidon Michaniona	1–0	AEK Athens
Prittas 35'	Report (page 30)

Poseidon Nea Michaniona Stadium, Thessaloniki
Attendance: 1,112
Referee: Malamas Tevekelis (Thessaloniki)

== Bracket ==
Second round
Panegialios	1
PAOK (a.e.t.)	3
Panserraikos (bye)
Kavala	0
Paniliakos	3
Panathinaikos	2
Panelefsiniakos	1
AEL (a.e.t.)	1
Ampelokipoi Thessaloniki	0
Panargiakos	1
Athinaikos	2
Aiolikos (p)	0(5)
Anagennisi Karditsa	0(4)
Kalamata	2
Marko	0
OFI	2
Ionikos (a.e.t.)	3
Aris	1
Olympiacos	3
Skoda Xanthi (a.e.t.)	1
Ethnikos Piraeus	0
A.O. Karditsa	2
Panetolikos	1
ILTEX Lykoi	2
EAR	1
Kozani (bye)
Poseidon Michaniona (p)	1(8)
Panachaiki	1(7)
Ialysos	2(2)
Iraklis (p)	2(4)

Round of 16
PAOK	0
Panserraikos	1
Paniliakos	0
Panathinaikos	2
AEL	0
Athinaikos	2
Aiolikos	0
Kalamata	3
Ionikos	4
Olympiacos	7
Skoda Xanthi	2
A.O. Karditsa	0
ILTEX Lykoi	5
Kozani	1
Poseidon Michaniona	1
Iraklis	2

Quarter-finals
Panserraikos	0	0	0
Panathinaikos	3	2	5
Athinaikos (a)	0	1	1
Kalamata	0	1	1
Olympiacos	3	0	3
Skoda Xanthi	1	1	2
ILTEX Lykoi	1	2	3
Iraklis	3	1	4

Semi-finals
Panathinaikos	6	2	8
Athinaikos	1	2	3
Olympiacos	4	1	5
Iraklis	0	1	1

Final
Panathinaikos	0
Olympiacos	2

== Second round ==
=== Summary ===
Team 1	Score	Team 2
Panathinaikos	2–1	Panelefsiniakos
OFI	2–3 (a.e.t.)	Ionikos
Aiolikos	0–0 (5–4 p)	Anagennisi Karditsa
Kalamata	2–0	Marko
Poseidon Michaniona	1–1 (8–7 p)	Panachaiki
Kavala	0–3	Paniliakos
A.O. Karditsa	2–1	Panetolikos
Panegialios	1–3 (a.e.t.)	PAOK
AEL	1–0 (a.e.t.)	Ampelokipoi Thessaloniki
ILTEX Lykoi	2–1	EAR
Panargiakos	1–2	Athinaikos
Ialysos	2–2 (2–4 p)	Iraklis
Skoda Xanthi	1–0 (a.e.t.)	Ethnikos Piraeus
Aris	1–3	Olympiacos
Panserraikos	bye	
Kozani	bye	

=== Matches ===
16 December 1998
13:00 EET

Panathinaikos	2–1	Panelefsiniakos
Warzycha 29'; Asanović 89'	Report (page 31)	Tsironis 90+3' (pen.)

Olympic Stadium, Marousi
Attendance: 258
Referee: Malamas Tevekelis (Thessaloniki)

16 December 1998
13:00 EET

OFI	2–3 (a.e.t.)	Ionikos
M. Diarra 39'; Tsiantakis 118'	Report (page 31)	Andrioli 70'; Muchotrigo 100'; Afentoulidis 115'

Theodoros Vardinogiannis Stadium, Heraklion
Attendance: 940
Referee: Spyros Koutsogiannis (Aetoloacarnania)

16 December 1998
13:00 EET

Aiolikos	0–0 (a.e.t.)	Anagennisi Karditsa
	Report (page 30)
Penalties
	5–4

Mytilene Municipal Stadium, Mytilene

16 December 1998
13:00 EET

Kalamata	2–0	Marko
Bachramis 42'; Troupkos 73'	Report (page 30)

Messiniakos Stadium, Kalamata

16 December 1998
13:00 EET

Poseidon Michaniona	1–1 (a.e.t.)	Panachaiki
Avramidis 66'	Report (pages 32-33)	D. Jovanović 59'
Penalties
Theodoridis (penalty missed); Zarfiadis (penalty scored); Novi (penalty scored); Dmitsoudis (penalty scored); Anastasopoulos (penalty scored); Kazatzis (penalty scored); Pekridis (penalty scored); Papastergios (penalty scored); Neofotistos (penalty scored)	8–7	(penalty scored) Vaitsis; (penalty scored) Katsouranis; (penalty scored) Paflias; (penalty scored) Mimpo; (penalty missed) D. Jovanović; (penalty scored) Kapouranis; (penalty scored) Kordonouris; (penalty scored) Pavlidis; (penalty missed) Papaefthimiou

Poseidon Nea Michaniona Stadium, Thessaloniki
Attendance: 350
Referee: Manolis Grimmas (Athens)

16 December 1998
13:00 EET

Kavala	0–3	Paniliakos
	Report (page 30)	Ferekidis 63'; Sapanis 66'; Rosales 72'

Anthi Karagianni Stadium, Kavala

16 December 1998
13:00 EET

A.O. Karditsa	2–1	Panetolikos
Koutsopoulos 25'; Nedeljković 59'	Report (page 30)	Dallas 90'

Karditsa Municipal Stadium, Karditsa

16 December 1998
13:00 EET

Panegialios	1–3 (a.e.t.)	PAOK
Spanos 38'	Report (page 32)	Cominges 11', 100'; Kafes 113'

Aigio National Stadium, Aigio
Attendance: 2,986
Referee: Giorgos Kasnaferis (Athens)

16 December 1998
13:00 EET

AEL	1–0 (a.e.t.)	Ampelokipoi Thessaloniki
Avramoulis 111'	Report (page 30)

Alcazar Stadium, Larissa

16 December 1998
13:00 EET

ILTEX Lykoi	2–1	EAR
Klokidis 15'; Kakoglou 70'	Report (page 30)	Fysseas 36'

Stelios Iliadis Stadium, Thessaloniki

16 December 1998
13:00 EET

Panargiakos	1–2	Athinaikos
Da Silva 8'	Report (page 30)	Anastasiou 29'; Kampas 30'

Argos Municipal Stadium, Argos

17 December 1998
13:00 EET

Ialysos	2–2 (a.e.t.)	Iraklis
P. Kyparissis 7'; Kantimoiris 118'	Report (page 30)	Christodoulou 29', 107'
Penalties
	2–4

Municipal Stadium Ekonomideio, Ialysos

17 December 1998
13:00 EET

Skoda Xanthi	1–0 (a.e.t.)	Ethnikos Piraeus
Kyparissis 92'	Report (page 30)

Skoda Xanthi Arena, Xanthi

17 December 1998
21:00 EET

Aris	1–3	Olympiacos
Vlachoudis 68'	Report (pages 33-34)	Luciano 4'; Gogić 9', 20'

Kleanthis Vikelidis Stadium, Thessaloniki
Attendance: 8,800
Referee: Dimitris Begos (Argolida)

== Round of 16 ==
=== Summary ===
Team 1	Score	Team 2
Ionikos	4–7	Olympiacos
AEL	0–2	Athinaikos
PAOK	0–1	Panserraikos
ILTEX Lykoi	5–1	Kozani
Poseidon Michaniona	1–2	Iraklis
Skoda Xanthi	2–0	A.O. Karditsa
Aiolikos	0–3	Kalamata
Paniliakos	0–2	Panathinaikos

=== Matches ===
12 January 1999
16:15 EET

Ionikos	4–7	Olympiacos
Muchotrigo 15'; Daraklitsas 31'; Filis 57'; Afentoulidis 80'	Report (page 34)	Karapialis 30'; Georgatos 41'; Giannakopoulos 42', 65'; Niniadis 44'; Ivić 53'; Ofori-Quaye 41'

Neapoli Stadium, Piraeus
Attendance: 2,249
Referee: Pavlos Konstantinidis (Piraeus)

13 January 1999
14:30 EEST

AEL	0–2	Athinaikos
	Report (page 34)	Kozanidis 9', 39'

Alcazar Stadium, Larissa

13 January 1999
18:00 EET

PAOK	0–1	Panserraikos
	Report (pages 34-35)	Ipirotis 84'

Kavala National Stadium, Kavala
Attendance: 1,866
Referee: Giannis Abelakias (Thessaly)

The match took place at Kavala because due to punishment of PAOK.

13 January 1999
13:00 EET

ILTEX Lykoi	5–1	Kozani
Zekeridis 2'; Anastasiadis 57' (o.g.); Dabić 69'; Pantelis 80', 90'	Report (page 34)	Mihajlović 55' (pen.)

Stelios Iliadis Stadium, Thessaloniki

13 January 1999
13:00 EET

Poseidon Michaniona	1–2	Iraklis
Prittas 73'	Report (page 34)	Konstantinou 49' (pen.); Stoltidis 90'

Poseidon Nea Michaniona Stadium, Thessaloniki

13 January 1999
13:00 EET

Skoda Xanthi	2–0	A.O. Karditsa
Kartalis 63'; Tengelidis 65'	Report (page 34)

Skoda Xanthi Arena, Xanthi

13 January 1999
13:00 EET

Aiolikos	0–3	Kalamata
	Report (page 34)	Mikes 29'; Sandro 51'; Bachramis 56'

Mytilene Municipal Stadium, Mytilene

14 January 1999
13:00 EEST

Paniliakos	0–2	Panathinaikos
	Report (page 35)	Liberopoulos 13' (pen.), 85'

Pyrgos Stadium, Pyrgos

== Quarter-finals ==
=== Summary ===
Team 1	Agg.	Team 2	1st leg	2nd leg
ILTEX Lykoi	3–4	Iraklis	1–3	2–1
Panserraikos	0–5	Panathinaikos	0–3	0–2
Olympiacos	3–2	Skoda Xanthi	3–1	0–1
Athinaikos	(a) 1–1	Kalamata	0–0	1–1

=== Matches ===
27 January 1999
15:15 EET

ILTEX Lykoi	1–3	Iraklis
Pantelis 12'	Report (pages 36-37)	Semos 18'; Andersson 84'; Ignatiadis 90+2' (o.g.)

Stelios Iliadis Stadium, Thessaloniki
Attendance: 736
Referee: Kostas Vallianos (Aetoloacarnania)
17 February 1999
18:00 EET

Iraklis	1–2	ILTEX Lykoi
Xenidis 49'	Report (page 37)	Klokidis 27'; Katikaridis 90'

Kaftanzoglio Stadium, Thessaloniki
Attendance: 540
Referee: Christos Mittas (Thessaloniki)

Iraklis won 4–3 on aggregate.

11 February 1999
15:15 EET

Panserraikos	0–3	Panathinaikos
	Report (pages 37-38)	Goumas 16'; Sypniewski 27'; Vokolos 86'

Serres Municipal Stadium, Serres
Attendance: 2,975
Referee: Giorgos Bikas (Chalkidiki)
18 February 1999
19:00 EET

Panathinaikos	2–0	Panserraikos
Milojević 45+1' (pen.); Sypniewski 85'	Report (page 38)

Olympic Stadium, Marousi
Attendance: 756
Referee: Spyros Papadakos (Laconia)

Panathinaikos won 5–0 on aggregate.

11 February 1999
19:00 EET

Olympiacos	3–1	Skoda Xanthi
Karapialis 1'; Georgatos 51' (pen.); Alexandris 76'	Report (pages 38-39)	Mansourian 51'

Olympic Stadium, Marousi
Attendance: 4,573
Referee: Nikos Aggelakis (Thessaloniki)
18 February 1999
16:15 EET

Skoda Xanthi	1–0	Olympiacos
Kyparissis 51'	Report (page 39)

Skoda Xanthi Arena, Xanthi
Attendance: 1,444
Referee: Dimitris Begos (Argolida)

Olympiacos won 3–2 on aggregate.

10 February 1999
15:15 EET

Athinaikos	0–0	Kalamata
	Report (pages 37-38)

Vyronas National Stadium, Vyronas
Attendance: 497
Referee: Dimitrios Chouliaras (Preveza-Lefkada)
17 February 1999
15:00 EET

Kalamata	1–1	Athinaikos
Troupkos 51'	Report (page 38)	Kozanidis 34'

Messiniakos Stadium, Kalamata
Attendance: 1,116
Referee: Kostas Finokaliotis (Athens)

Athinaikos won on away goals.

== Semi-finals ==
=== Summary ===
Team 1	Agg.	Team 2	1st leg	2nd leg
Panathinaikos	8–3	Athinaikos	6–1	2–2
Olympiacos	5–1	Iraklis	4–0	1–1

=== Matches ===
6 April 1999
16:30 EEST

Panathinaikos	6–1	Athinaikos
Mauro 4', 74'; Warzycha 23', 41', 65'; Karagounis 24'	Report (pages 39-40)	Veletakos 18'

Olympic Stadium, Marousi
Attendance: 899
Referee: Christoforos Zografos (Athens)
13 April 1999
16:30 EEST

Athinaikos	2–2	Panathinaikos
Mišeljić 77'; Charisteas 81'	Report (page 40)	Podaras 41'; Alexopoulos 85' (pen.)

Vyronas National Stadium, Vyronas
Attendance: 287
Referee: Andreas Aronis (Piraeus)

Panathinaikos won 8–3 on aggregate.

7 April 1999
16:30 EEST

Olympiacos	4–0	Iraklis
Anatolakis 23'; Mavrogenidis 66'; Xenidis 70' (o.g.); Gogić 86'	Report (pages 40-41)

Olympic Stadium, Marousi
Attendance: 5,864
Referee: Dimitris Kalivas (Boeotia)
11 April 1999
19:45 EEST

Iraklis	1–1	Olympiacos
Tavlaridis 47'	Report (page 41)	Gogić 29'

Kaftanzoglio Stadium, Thessaloniki
Attendance: 1,064
Referee: Giorgos Borovilos (Arcadia)

Olympiacos won 5–1 on aggregate.

== Final ==
5 May 1999
21:00 EEST

Panathinaikos	0–2	Olympiacos
	Report	Mavrogenidis 54'; Ofori-Quaye 90'

Olympic Stadium, Marousi
Attendance: 57,783
Referee: Giorgos Douros (Corinthia)

== Top scorers ==
Rank	Player	Club	Goals
1	(Poland) Krzysztof Warzycha	Panathinaikos	5
2	(Greece) Antonis Kefaloukos	Marko	4
2	(Peru) Paul Cominges	PAOK	4
2	(Cyprus) Siniša Gogić	Olympiacos	4
5	(Serbia) Ivan Nedeljković	A.O. Karditsa	3
5	(Greece) Miltiadis Sapanis	Paniliakos	3
5	(Greece) Kyriakos Pantelis	ILTEX Lykoi	3
5	(Greece) Stelios Kozanidis	Olympiacos	3
5	(Greece) Stelios Giannakopoulos	Athinaikos	3
5	(Greece) Nikos Liberopoulos	Panathinaikos	3
