= 1999–2000 Ionikos F.C. season =

Ionikos
1999–2000 season
- Manager: Oleg Blokhin
- Stadium: Neapoli Stadium
- Alpha Ethniki: 10th
- Greek Cup: Runners-up
- UEFA Cup: First round

The 1999–2000 season was Ionikos' 6th straight season on the Greek first tier and the 9th season on that tier overall. Managing a lower league finish than the previous season, their biggest feat was reaching the domestic cup final.

== Players ==
=== Squad ===
No.	Pos	Nat	Player	Total		Alpha Ethniki		UEFA Cup	
No.	Pos	Nat	Player	Apps	Goals	Apps	Goals	Apps	Goals
1	GK	(Greece) GRE	Chrysostomos Veniamin	3	0	3	0	0	0
2	DF	(Norway) NOR	Trond Inge Haugland	25	0	24	0	1	0
3	DF	(Greece) GRE	Theodoros Pachatouridis	28	0	26	0	2	0
5	DF	(Greece) GRE	Giannis Xanthopoulos	31	1	29	1	2	0
7	MF	(Greece) GRE	Georgios Daraklitsas	26	3	26	3	0	0
8	MF	(Syria) SYR	Mohamad Afash	33	4	31	4	2	0
9	FW	(Scotland) SCO	Craig Brewster	33	8	31	8	2	0
10	FW	(Brazil) BRA	Paulinho Kobayashi	34	7	32	7	2	0
11	MF	(Colombia) COL	Lener Baltan	3	0	3	0	0	0
12	DF	(Greece) GRE	Christos Dagounakis	1	0	1	0	0	0
12	DF	(Greece) GRE	Apostolos Tsoptsis	13	0	13	0	0	0
13	FW	(Greece) GRE	Sotiris Kanavos	0	0	0	0	0	0
14	DF	(Greece) GRE	Ioannis Girichidis	28	0	27	0	1	0
15	GK	(Albania) ALB	Foto Strakosha	34	0	32	0	2	0
16	MF	(Greece) GRE	Georgios Staboulis	14	0	13	0	1	0
17	DF	(Greece) GRE	Sokratis Ofridopoulos	21	2	19	2	2	0
18	MF	(Norway) NOR	Paal Christian Alsaker	9	0	7	0	2	0
19	MF	(Greece) GRE	Nikolaos Tsiavdaris	1	0	1	0	0	0
20	MF	(Peru) PER	Martín Rodríguez	17	0	16	0	1	0
21	MF	(Greece) GRE	Dimitris Deligiannis	23	0	22	0	1	0
22	GK	(Greece) GRE	Theodoros Gitkos	0	0	0	0	0	0
23	FW	(Liberia) LBR	Zizi Roberts	15	8	15	8	0	0
24	DF	(Greece) GRE	Antonio Glauko	7	0	5	0	2	0
27	MF	(Argentina) ARG	Marcelo Ledesma	19	1	19	1	0	0
28	DF	(Greece) GRE	Alexandros Tsolas	9	0	9	0	0	0
29	FW	(Peru) PER	Darío Muchotrigo	31	4	29	4	2	0
30	MF	(Greece) GRE	Dimitrios Afentoulidis	13	1	13	1	0	0
31	MF	(Greece) GRE	Dimitrios Mylonas	3	0	3	0	0	0

=== Players who left during the season ===
No.	Pos	Nat	Player	Total		Alpha Ethniki		UEFA Cup	
No.	Pos	Nat	Player	Apps	Goals	Apps	Goals	Apps	Goals
4	DF	(Greece) GRE	Athanasios Pangouras	1	0	1	0	0	0
11	DF	(Greece) GRE	Nikos Vavilis	4	0	3	0	1	0
23	FW	(Nigeria) NGA	Cornelius Udebuluzor	4	0	4	0	0	0
27	DF	(Greece) GRE	Ioannis Dimitriadis	7	1	5	0	2	1

== Managers ==
- Konstantinos Polychroniou: 1 July 1999 – 7 October 1999
- Sokratis Gemelos: 8 October 1999 – 6 March 2000
- Oleg Blokhin: 7 March 2000 – end of season

== Alpha Ethniki ==
=== League table ===
Pos	Team	Pld	W	D	L	GF	GA	GD	Pts	Qualification or relegation
8	Panionios	34	14	3	17	50	63	−13	45	Qualification for UEFA Cup play-off
9	Kalamata	34	12	8	14	41	57	−16	44	Qualification for Intertoto Cup third round
10	Ionikos	34	10	11	13	40	50	−10	41 (Note: Head-to-head points (goal difference): Ionikos 9 (+4), Xanthi 4 (-1), Ethnikos Asteras 4 (-3).)	
11	Skoda Xanthi	34	11	8	15	36	43	−7	41	
12	Ethnikos Asteras	34	12	5	17	33	50	−17	41	

Source: Galanis Sports Data
Rules for classification: 1) Points; 2) Head-to-head points; 3) Head-to-head goal difference; 4) Goal difference; 5) Goals scored; 6) Goals against; 7) Play-offs (neutral ground); 8) Draw.
(Note: Criterion 7 is only used if needed to decide champion, teams for relegation or teams for UEFA competitions).

=== Greek Cup ===
==== Group 8 ====
Pos	Team	Pld	W	D	L	GF	GA	GD	Pts	Qualification	PAO	ION	LEO	PNT	KER	IAL
1	Panathinaikos	5	5	0	0	18	1	+17	15	Round of 16		1–0	4–0	5–1	—	—
2	Ionikos	5	3	0	2	13	5	+8	9	Additional Round	—		—	3–0	3–2	6–0
3	Leonidio	5	3	0	2	6	6	0	9		—	2–1		—	1–0	3–0
4	Panetolikos	5	3	0	2	6	8	−2	9		—	—	1–0		2–0	—
5	Keratsini	5	1	0	4	5	10	−5	3		0–3	—	—	—		3–1
6	Ialysos	5	0	0	5	1	19	−18	0		0–5	—	—	0–2	—	

Source: epo.gr

==== Matches ====
11 August 1999 1	Ionikos	3–0	Panetolikos	Nikaia
13:00 EEST	Muchotrigo 9'; Kobayashi 29'; Dos Santos 88'	Report (page 1)		Stadium: Neapoli Stadium

22 August 1999 2	Leonidio	2–1	Ionikos	Leonidio
13:00 EEST	Sakellaropoulos 4'; Spanos 47'	Report (page 2)	Muchotrigo 48'	Stadium: Leonidio Municipal Stadium

25 August 1999 3	Panathinaikos	1–0	Ionikos	Ampelokipoi
13:00 EEST	Liberopoulos 42'	Report (page 2)		Stadium: Leoforos Alexandras Stadium

29 August 1999 4	Ionikos	6–0	Ialysos	Nikaia
13:00 EEST	Ofridopoulos 3'; Dos Santos 30'; Muchotrigo 54', 79'; Kobayashi 69'; Cornelius 85'	Report (page 3)		Stadium: Neapoli Stadium

13 October 1999 5	Ionikos	3–2	Keratsini	Nikaia
13:00 EEST	Muchotrigo 8'; Brewster 23'; Alsaker 54'	Report (page 4)	Koulis 30'; Kritikos 51'	Stadium: Neapoli Stadium

===== Additional round =====
10 November 1999 Additional round	Ionikos	4–1	Marko	Nikaia
13:00 EET	Alsaker 47', 64'; Kobayashi 50'; Brewster 65'	Report (page 30-31)	Skarmoutsos 22'	Stadium: Neapoli Stadium

===== Round of 16 =====
12 January 2000 Round of 16	Ionikos	4–2	Iraklis	Nikaia
14:30 EET	Roberts 47'; Brewster 77', 83'; Kobayashi 88'	Report (page 32)	Konstantinou 45'; Sebwe 59'	Stadium: Neapoli Stadium

===== Quarter-finals =====
9 February 2000 First leg	Ionikos	8–0	Nafpaktiakos Asteras	Nikaia
17:00 EET	Kobayashi 3', 78'; Brewster 15'; Haugland 47', 84', 88'; Ofrydopoulos 71'; Afentoulidis 90'	Report (page 32-33)		Stadium: Neapoli Stadium

1 March 2000 Second leg	Nafpaktiakos Asteras	2–1 (2–9 agg.)	Ionikos	Nafpaktos
16:00 EET	Karageorgos 57'; Papapostolou 74'	Report (page 33)	Afentoulidis 80'	Stadium: Papacharalambeio Ethniko Stadio

===== Semi-finals =====
5 April 2000 First leg	Kalamata	0–2	Ionikos	Kalamata
16:30 EEST		Report (page 34)	Muchotrigo 83'; Roberts 90+3'	Stadium: Kalamata Municipal Stadium

19 April 2000 Second leg	Ionikos	4–2 (6–2 agg.)	Kalamata	Nikaia
17:00 EEST	Xanthopoulos 10'; Muchotrigo 49'; Tsiavdaris 90+1'; Afash 90+2'	Report (page 35)	Simons 57'; Kappos 83'	Stadium: Neapoli Stadium

===== Final =====
10 May 2000 Final	AEK Athens	3–0	Ionikos	Marousi
20:00 EEST	Nikolaidis 37'; Petkov 76'; Maladenis 81'	Report (page 35)		Stadium: Olympic Stadium; Attendance: 25,471; Referee: Giorgos Douros (Corinthia)

== UEFA Cup ==
=== First round ===
16 September 1999 First leg	Ionikos (Greece)	1–3	(France) Nantes	Athens, Greece
	Dimitriadis 90'	Report	Lièvre 56'; Monterrubio 67', 83'	Stadium: Olympic Stadium; Attendance: 3,500; Referee: Manfred Schüttengruber (Austria)

30 September 1999 Second leg	Nantes (France)	1–0 (4–1 agg.)	(Greece) Ionikos	Nantes, France
	Da Rocha 48'	Report		Stadium: Stade de la Beaujoire; Attendance: 18,522; Referee: Morgan Norman (Sweden)
