= Afentoulidis =

Afentoulidis is a surname. Notable people with the surname include:

- Anestis Afentoulidis (1941–2024), Greek footballer
- Dimitrios Afentoulidis (born 1974), Greek footballer
