= Cannavò =

Cannavò (pronounced [kannaˈvɔ]) is a Sicilian surname, derived from Greek κανναβός kannabós, 'grey-haired'. Notable people with the surname include:

- Candido Cannavò (1930–2009), Italian journalist
- Ignazio Cannavò (1921–2015), Italian Roman Catholic prelate
- Kevin Cannavò (born 2000), Maltese footballer
- Rosalinda Cannavò (born 1992), Italian actress and singer
- Valeria Cannavò (born 2000), Venezuelan fashion designer and beauty pageant titleholder

Cannavò may also refer to:

- Cannavò, a neighborhood of Reggio Calabria, Italy

== See also ==
- Sotiris Kannavos
