= Merkourios Karaliopoulos =

Greek footballer

Personal information
- Full name: Merkourios Georgios Karaliopoulos
- Date of birth: 26 November 1977 (age 48)
- Place of birth: Alexandreia, Greece
- Height: 1.78 m (5 ft 10 in)
- Position: Defender

Senior career*
Years	Team	Apps	(Gls)
1995–2000	Naoussa		
2000–2005	Aris		
2005–2008	Apollon Kalamarias		
2008	Veria		
2009	Rodos		
2009–2010	Naoussa		
2010–2011	Apollon Kalamarias		
2011–2013	Naoussa		
- * Club domestic league appearances and goals

Merkourios Karaliopoulos (Greek: Μερκούριος Καραλιόπουλος; born 26 November 1977) is a retired Greek footballer who played as a defender.
