= Stefanos Basinas =

Greek footballer (born 1968)

Personal information
- Date of birth: 23 October 1968 (age 58)
- Place of birth: Pournos, Euboea, Greece
- Height: 1.70 m (5 ft 7 in)
- Position: Midfielder

Senior career*
Years	Team	Apps	(Gls)
–1995	Rethymniako		
1995–1996	Levadiakos		
1996–1998	Kallithea		
1998–2002	Ethnikos Asteras		
2002–2003	Apollon Smyrnis		
2003–2004	Chalkida		
- * Club domestic league appearances and goals

Stefanos Basinas (Greek: Στέφανος Μπασινάς; born 23 October 1968) is a retired Greek football midfielder. (Note: Stefanos Basinas at WorldFootball.net)

His brother is Angelos Basinas, ex captain of Panathinaikos and Euro 2004 winner.
