= Anestis Afentoulidis =

Greek footballer (1941–2024)

Personal information
- Date of birth: 7 December 1941
- Place of birth: Mesopotamia, Hellenic State
- Date of death: 6 April 2024 (aged 82)
- Place of death: Thessaloniki, Greece
- Position: Forward

Youth career
- Athletic Club Mesopotamia
- Orestias Kastoria

Senior career*
Years	Team	Apps	(Gls)
1962–1965	Aris Kastoria		
1965–1970	PAOK	158	(58)
1970–1976	Kastoria	210	(82)
1973–1974	→ Toronto Homer (loan)		
- * Club domestic league appearances and goals

Anestis Afentoulidis (Greek: Ανέστης Αφεντουλίδης; 7 December 1941 – 6 April 2024) was a Greek professional footballer who played as a forward.

== Career ==
Afentoulidis played at the youth level with Athletic Club Mesopotamia, and with Orestias Kastoria. In 1962, he played in the Association of Football Clubs of Kozani with Aris Kastoria, and contributed to securing promotion to the Beta Ethniki in his debut season. In the 1963–64 season he finished as the league's top goal scorer with 23 goals. In 1965, he played in the Alpha Ethniki with PAOK. Throughout his tenure with PAOK he featured in the 1965–66 Inter-Cities Fairs Cup, and the 1967–68 Inter-Cities Fairs Cup.

In 1970, he returned to his former team under the new name Kastoria. The following season he finished as the Beta Ethnik's top goal scorer for the second time in his career. In 1973, he finished for the third time in his career as the league's top goal scorer with 20 goals. He helped Kastoria achieve promotion to the Alpha Ethniki in the 1973–74 season. In the summer of 1973, he played abroad in the National Soccer League with Toronto Homer. He returned to play with Toronto Homer for the 1974 summer season.

== Personal life and death ==
His son is Dimitrios Afentoulidis.

Anestis Afentoulidis died on 6 April 2024, at the age of 82.
