= Giannis Dimitriadis =

Greek footballer

Personal information
- Full name: Ioannis Dimitriadis
- Date of birth: 5 January 1970 (age 56)
- Position: Defender

Senior career*
Years	Team	Apps	(Gls)
1988–1994	Apollon Kalamarias		
1994–1996	Aris		
1996–1997	Apollon Kalamarias		
1997–1998	Athinaikos		
1998–1999	Panelefsiniakos		
1999	Ionikos		
2000–2003	Xanthi		
2003–2004	Kavala		
2004–2005	Vistonida A.C.		
- * Club domestic league appearances and goals

Giannis Dimitriadis (Greek: Γιάννης Δημητριάδης; born 5 January 1970) is a retired Greek football defender.
