= Milan Pavlović (footballer) =

Serbian former footballer

Milan Pavlović Милан Павловић
Personal information
- Full name: Milan Pavlović
- Date of birth: 30 December 1967 (age 58)
- Place of birth: Šabac, SR Serbia, SFR Yugoslavia
- Position: Defender

Senior career*
Years	Team	Apps	(Gls)
1987–1991	Željezničar Sarajevo	84	(6)
1992–1993	Visaltiakos Nigrita	30	(4)
1993–1995	Anagennisi Karditsa	66	(11)
1995–1996	Iraklis	24	(1)
1997–1998	Anagennisi Karditsa	33	(8)
1998–2002	Ethnikos Asteras	108	(1)
2002–2003	PAO Rouf		
2003–2004	Agia Paraskevi		
Total		345	(31)

International career
1987	Yugoslavia U20	6	(0)
Medal record
Representing Yugoslavia
Gold medal – first place	FIFA U-20 World Cup	1987
- * Club domestic league appearances and goals

Milan Pavlović (Serbian Cyrillic: Милан Павловић; born 30 December 1967) is a Serbian retired footballer who played as a defender.

== Club career ==
Pavlović began playing football with FK Željezničar Sarajevo in the Yugoslav First League.

Pavlović moved to Greece in July 1992, initially joining third tier side Visaltiakos Nigrita before spending two years with Anagennisi Karditsa F.C. on the second tier. He would move up to play for Iraklis during the 1995–96 Alpha Ethniki season. After another season with Anagennisi Karditsa on the second tier, he moved to first-tier side Ethnikos Asteras F.C. for four seasons. In total, Pavlović made 132 appearances in the Greek top flight.

== International career ==
Pavlović became world champion with Yugoslavia at the 1987 FIFA World Youth Championship in Chile. He was the national team captain at that World Cup.

== Honours ==
Yugoslavia Youth

- FIFA World Youth Championship: 1987
