= Jovo Mišeljić =

Bosnian footballer (1967–2023)

Personal information
- Date of birth: 15 October 1967
- Place of birth: Trebinje, SR Bosnia and Herzegovina, SFR Yugoslavia
- Date of death: 17 May 2023 (aged 55)
- Place of death: Niš, Serbia
- Height: 1.73 m (5 ft 8 in)
- Position: Forward

Senior career*
| Years | Team | Apps | (Gls) |
| 1990–1992 | Leotar | 48 | (10) |
| 1992–1994 | Radnički Niš | 82 | (14) |
| 1995 | Badajoz | 21 | (1) |
| 1995–1997 | Aris Limassol | 49 | (11) |
| 1997–1998 | Apollon Limassol | 24 | (5) |
| 1998 | Aris Limassol | 14 | (3) |
| 1999–2000 | Athinaikos | 34 | (3) |
| 2000–2001 | Proleter Zrenjanin | 48 | (7) |
| 2001–2003 | Radnički Niš | 15 | (3) |
| 2003 | → Leotar (loan) | 30 | (4) |
| 2003–2004 | OFK Niš | | |
- * Club domestic league appearances and goals

Jovo Mišeljić (Serbian Cyrillic: Јово Мишељић; 15 October 1967 – 17 May 2023) was a Bosnian footballer who played as a forward.

== Career ==
After starting to play with his home city club FK Leotar still in the Yugoslav Second League, with the beginning of the war he moved to Serbia where he played three solid seasons with FK Radnički Niš. In 1995, after a short spell in Spain with CD Badajoz, he moved to Cyprus to play with Aris Limassol FC where he played three seasons and then transferring to Apollon Limassol FC. Afterwards he moved to Greece to play for one season with Athinaikos F.C. In 2000, he returned to Serbia and signed with FK Proleter Zrenjanin, but shortly after one season returned to Radnički Niš. He also played a half season as a loaned player with his first club, FK Leotar, before finishing in a lower league OFK Niš.

== Personal life and death ==
Mišeljić resided in Cyprus where he occasionally played non-league football, as well as coached smaller category teams and the youth teams of Aris Limassol.

Mišeljić died on 17 May 2023, at the age of 55.
