= Thanasis Sentementes =

Greek footballer

Personal information
- Full name: Thanasis Sentementes
- Date of birth: 23 December 1975 (age 50)
- Place of birth: Kalamata, Greece
- Height: 1.91 m (6 ft 3 in)
- Position: Defender

Senior career*
Years	Team	Apps	(Gls)
1995–1996	Kalamata	2	(?)
1996–1998	Doxa Vyronas	59	(5)
1998–1999	Kalamata	24	(2)
1999–2000	PAS Giannina	30	(2)
2000–2007	Kalamata	170	(1)
2007–2008	Panserraikos	30	(?)
2008–2009	Kerkyra		
2009–2010	Panachaiki		
- * Club domestic league appearances and goals

Thanasis Sentementes (Greek: Θανάσης Σεντεμέντες) is a Greek footballer currently signed to Kerkyra.
