= Stelios Sfakianakis =

Greek footballer

Personal information
- Full name: Stylianos Sfakianakis
- Date of birth: 19 March 1976 (age 50)
- Place of birth: Hagen, West Germany
- Height: 1.77 m (5 ft 10 in)
- Position: Midfielder

Youth career
- Pagheo

Senior career*
Years	Team	Apps	(Gls)
1994–1996	Kavala	53	(10)
1996–2000	Olympiacos	38	(4)
2000–2004	Skoda Xanthi	72	(3)
2004–2005	Olympiakos Nicosia	18	(1)
2005–2009	OFI	94	(17)
2009–2012	Atromitos	49	(7)
2012–2014	Panetolikos	61	(3)
Total		385	(45)

International career
1997–1998	Greece U21	1	(0)
- * Club domestic league appearances and goals

Stelios Sfakianakis (Greek: Στέλιος Σφακιανάκης; born 19 March 1976) is a Greek former professional footballer who played as a midfielder.

== Career ==
Born in Hagen, Sfakianakis moved to Greece where he began his professional career with Kavala, where he played in the Beta Ethniki and Alpha Ethniki. He transferred to Olympiacos in December 1996 and played in 38 Alpha Ethniki matches for the club over three and one-half seasons.

== Honours ==
Olympiacos

- Alpha Ethniki: 1997, 1998, 1999, 2000
- Greek Cup: 1999
