= Siadabida Manda =

Congolese footballer (born 1970)

Personal information
- Full name: Manda Kamwa Tshiendambinda
- Date of birth: 31 March 1970 (age 56)
- Place of birth: Kinshasa, Congo-Kinshasa
- Position: Midfielder

Senior career*
Years	Team	Apps	(Gls)
1995–1997	EAR	53	(3)
1997–1999	Kozani	37	(3)
1999–2002	Olympiacos Volos	69	(3)
2002–2004	Niki Volos	29	(1)
- Aias Tavros
- Korinthos
- Iraklis Xylokastro
- * Club domestic league appearances and goals

Siadabida Manda, or Mada, (born 31 March 1970) is a former football player from the Democratic Republic of Congo.

Manda was born in Kinshasa. He began playing football in Europe by joining a Belgian club at the age of 22. In 1995, he moved to Greece where he would play for EAR in the Beta Ethniki and Kozani in the Gamma Ethniki before joining Olympiacos Volos. After several seasons with Olympiacos Volos, Manda joined Niki Volos in the Gamma Ethniki during January 2003. He later played in Delta Ethniki sides Aias Tavros and Korinthos, and now plays in the Delta Ethniki with Iraklis Xylokastro.
