= Georgios Mitsiopoulos =

Greek footballer

Personal information
- Date of birth: 23 November 1974 (age 51)
- Place of birth: Thessaloniki, Greece
- Height: 1.85 m (6 ft 1 in)
- Position: Defender

Senior career*
Years	Team	Apps	(Gls)
–1996	Velissario		
1996–2000	Panionios		
2000–2001	Paniliakos		
2001–2002	Panachaiki		
2002–2003	Agrotikos Asteras		
2003–2005	PAS Giannina		
2005–2007	Doxa Drama		
2007–2008	Olympiacos Volos		
2008–2010	Anatoli		
- * Club domestic league appearances and goals

Georgios Mitsiopoulos (Greek: Γεώργιος Μητσιόπουλος; born 23 November 1974) is a retired Greek football defender.
