= Petros Dimitriadis =

Greek footballer

Personal information
- Date of birth: 21 January 1978 (age 48)
- Place of birth: Edessa, Greece
- Height: 1.87 m (6 ft 2 in)
- Position: Forward

Youth career
- ILTEX Lykoi
- Aetos Skydra

Senior career*
Years	Team	Apps	(Gls)
2004–2007	Xanthi		
2005–2006	→ Digenis Morphou (loan)		
2006	→ Panionios (loan)		
2006–2007	→ Levadiakos (loan)		
2007–2008	AEP Paphos		
2008–2009	Makedonikos		
2009–2012	Korinthos		
2012–2013	Panegialios		
2013–2014	Asteras Magoula		
2014–2015	Kalamata		
2015–2018	AS Korinthos		
- * Club domestic league appearances and goals

Petros Dimitriadis (Greek: Πέτρος Δημητριάδης; born 21 January 1978) is a retired Greek football striker.
