= Ismail Ba =

Senegalese former football midfielder

Personal information
- Full name: Ismail Ba
- Date of birth: May 12, 1974 (age 52)
- Place of birth: Senegal
- Height: 1.83 m (6 ft 0 in)
- Position: Midfielder

Senior career*
Years	Team	Apps	(Gls)
1998–2000	Skoda Xanthi	61	(20)
2000–2001	Aris	26	(1)
2001–2004	Skoda Xanthi	79	(3)
2004–2006	AEK Larnaca	38	(11)
2006–2008	Omonia	52	(5)
2008–2010	AEP Paphos	58	(10)
2010–2011	Atromitos	23	(2)

International career^{‡}
1997–2000	Senegal	3	(0)
- * Club domestic league appearances and goals as of 29 May 2009 ‡ National team caps and goals as of 8 December 2009

Ismail Ba (born 22 May 1974) is a Senegalese former football midfielder. He played for Greek clubs Skoda Xanthi and Aris and Cypriot clubs AEK Larnaca, Omonia, AEP Paphos and Atromitos Yeroskipou.
