= Theodoros Gitkos =

Greek footballer (born 1974)

Personal information
- Date of birth: 12 January 1974 (age 52)
- Place of birth: Trikala, Greece
- Height: 1.92 m (6 ft 4 in)
- Position: Goalkeeper

Senior career*
Years	Team	Apps	(Gls)
1993–1996	Veria		
1996–2000	Ionikos		
2001–2003	PAS Giannina		
2003–2004	Aris		
2004–2006	Kerkyra		
2006–2007	Niki Volos		
2007–2012	Ethnikos Asteras		
2012–2014	Olympiacos Volos		
2014–2015	Lefkadia		
- * Club domestic league appearances and goals

Theodoros Gitkos (Greek: Θεόδωρος Γκίτκος; born 12 January 1974) is a retired Greek football goalkeeper.
