= Konstantinos Palamaras =

Greek footballer

Personal information
- Full name: Konstantinos Palamaras
- Date of birth: 11 May 1975 (age 51)
- Position: Defender

Senior career*
Years	Team	Apps	(Gls)
1999–2001	Panionios		
2001–2003	Kalamata		
- * Club domestic league appearances and goals

Konstantinos Palamaras (Greek: Κωνσταντίνος Παλαμάρας; born 11 May 1975) is a retired Greek football defender.
