= Christos Dagounakis =

Greek footballer (born 1978)

Personal information
- Date of birth: 6 October 1978 (age 48)
- Height: 1.78 m (5 ft 10 in)
- Position: Defender

Senior career*
Years	Team	Apps	(Gls)
1999–2002	Ionikos		
2000–2001	→ Kallithea (loan)		
2002–2004	Proodeftiki		
2005	Ethnikos Piraeus		
2005–2006	Agios Dimitrios		
- * Club domestic league appearances and goals

Christos Dagounakis (Greek: Χρήστος Νταγκουνάκης; born 6 October 1978) is a retired Greek football defender.
