= Konstantinos Taxiarchis =

Greek footballer

Personal information
- Date of birth: 2 April 1974 (age 52)
- Place of birth: Larissa, Greece
- Height: 1.80 m (5 ft 11 in)
- Position: Midfielder

Senior career*
Years	Team	Apps	(Gls)
1993-2000	AEL		
2000-2002	Panachaiki		
2002-2003	Olympiacos Volos		
2003	Ethnikos Asteras		
2004	Veria		
2005	Kastoria		
2005-2006	Trikala		
2006-2007	Ermis Ermionis		
2007-2008	Panargiakos		
2009-2010	Apollon Smyrnis		
2010-2011	Apollon Larissa		
2011-2012	Dafni Glavki		
- * Club domestic league appearances and goals

Konstantinos Taxiarchis (Greek: Κωνσταντίνος Ταξιάρχης; born 2 April 1974) is a Greek former professional footballer who played as a midfielder.
