= Thomas Kyparissis =

Greek footballer

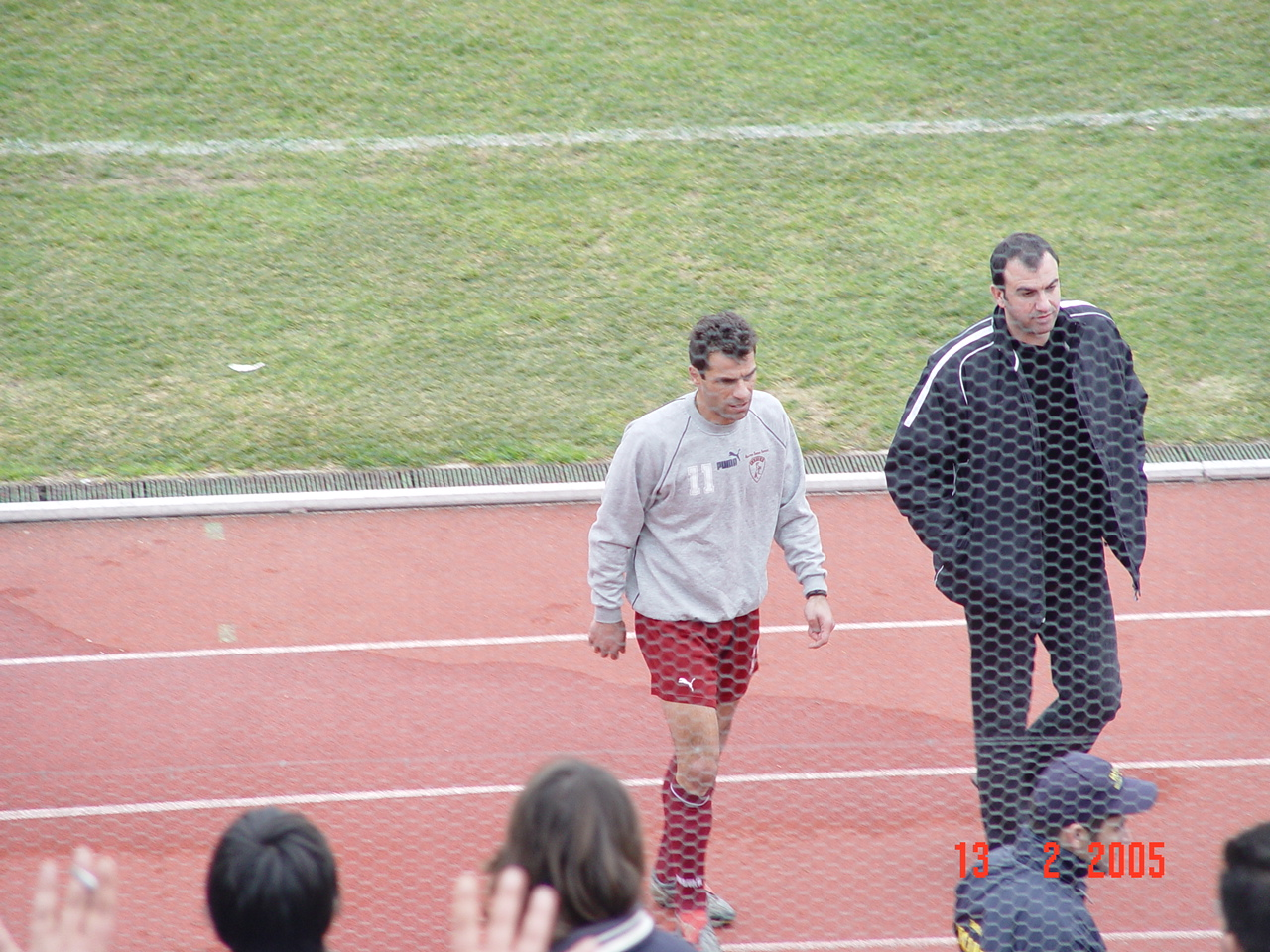
- Kyparissis in 2005

Personal information
- Date of birth: 26 March 1970 (age 56)
- Place of birth: Katerini, Greece
- Height: 1.87 m (6 ft 2 in)
- Position: Striker

Youth career
- Pierikos

Senior career*
Years	Team	Apps	(Gls)
1988–1991	Pierikos	17	(0)
1991–1992	Niki Volos	33	(13)
1992–1993	Panarkadikos	52	(22)
1994	Korinthos	6	(1)
1994–1996	Panelefsiniakos	64	(36)
1996–2000	Xanthi	106	(32)
2000–2001	Aris	22	(4)
2002–2003	PAS Giannina	43	(9)
2003–2007	AEL	87	(33)
2007–2008	Pierikos	20	(8)
Total		450	(158)

International career
1999–2000	Greece	14	(2)
- * Club domestic league appearances and goals

Thomas Kyparissis (Greek: Θωμάς Κυπαρίσσης; born 26 March 1970) is a Greek retired football player. He was a striker, who scored more than 150 goals in his entire career. He was a key player for AEL during the club's hard try to make it back to the first division from the third division from 2003 to 2005, and he continued to serve the team for two more seasons. Due to his strong mentality and passion, he was nicknamed "Psychara" (Big Soul) from Larissa's fans. From January 2007 he returned at his very first professional club and the team of his hometown, Pierikos. He retired a year later.
