= Srđan Cerović =

Serbian footballer and manager

Personal information
- Date of birth: 7 March 1971 (age 55)
- Place of birth: SFR Yugoslavia
- Position: Midfielder

Senior career*
Years	Team	Apps	(Gls)
1993–1995	Sloboda Užice		
1995–1997	Panachaiki	23	(2)
1997–1999	ILTEX Lykoi		
1999–2000	Kallithea		
2000–2001	Niki Volos		
2002–2003	Olympiacos Volos	27	(5)
2003–2004	Niki Volos		
2004–2005	Korinthos		
2007	Niki Volos		

Managerial career
- 2008: Niki Volos
- * Club domestic league appearances and goals

Srđan Cerović (born 7 March 1971) is a retired football player and manager.

== Playing career ==
Cerović began playing football for FK Sloboda Užice in the Serbian second division.

In 1995, Cerović joined Super League Greece side Panachaiki for two seasons. He played for several other Greek clubs, including second division side Olympiacos Volos during 2002—03 season.

== Managerial career ==
Following his playing career, Cerović became a manager, leading his former club Niki Volos in 2008.
