= Sotiris Kannavos =

Greek footballer

Personal information
- Date of birth: 24 February 1975 (age 51)
- Position: Forward

Senior career*
Years	Team	Apps	(Gls)
–1996	Erani Filiatra		
1996–1999	Ionikos		
2000–2002	Kallithea		
2002–2003	Panegialios		
2003–2007	Athinais		
- * Club domestic league appearances and goals

Sotiris Kannavos (Greek: Σωτήρης Κανναβός; born 24 February 1975) is a retired Greek football striker.
