= Kalamata Municipal Stadium =

Multi-purpose stadium in Kalamata, Greece

Kalamata Metropolitan Stadium
- Interactive map of Kalamata Metropolitan Stadium
- Address: Kalamata, Messenia; Greece
- Coordinates: 37.02725°N 22.124167°E
- Capacity: 4,496

Construction
- Opened: 1976

Tenant
- Kalamata

Kalamata Metropolitan Stadium is a sports arena in Kalamata, Messenia, Greece.

The stadium was completed in 1976, and currently has a seating capacity of 4,496.

The stadium is the home ground of Kalamata; also, the venue hosts the Papaflessia International Athletics Meeting and the annual Easter festival Saitopolemos.
