= Paal Christian Alsaker =

Norwegian footballer (born 1973)

Personal information
- Date of birth: 6 November 1973 (age 52)
- Height: 1.80 m (5 ft 11 in)
- Position: Midfielder

Youth career
- Solid
- Stord

Senior career*
Years	Team	Apps	(Gls)
1992–1993	Stord		
1993	Solid		
1994–1995	Vard		
1996	Solid		
1997	Trott		
1997–1999	Flora Tallinn		
1998	→ Stockport (loan)	1	(0)
1999	→ Rosenborg (loan)	4	(0)
1999–2000	Ionikos	7	(0)
2000–2003	Strømsgodset	84	(21)
2004	Haugesund	14	(1)
2005–2009	Notodden		
2010	Mjøndalen	12	(0)
2011–2012	Notodden	21	(0)
2014	Drammen FK		
2015	Skiold		
2017–	Åskollen		
- * Club domestic league appearances and goals

Paal Christian Alsaker (born 6 November 1973) is a retired Norwegian football midfielder.

Hailing from the island of Stord, he grew up in the club Solid. Until 1993 he played for Stord, joining Solid in the autumn and then Vard ahead of the 1994 1. divisjon season. In 1996 he returned to Solid, then signed for Trott in 1997. Coming in contact with the agent Terje Simonsen, he trialled unsuccessfully with Dunfermline and later secured a move to Estonian football. While here he was also loaned out to English second-tier club Stockport County for a less fruitful spell. He nonetheless wanted to move away from the Estonian league, and in 1999 he secured a contract with Norwegian sovereigns Rosenborg. However, after only four league games he again moved abroad in the summer of 1999, to Greek Ionikos. Ahead of the 2000 season he returned to Norway and Strømsgodset from Drammen, his most stable outfit where he stayed for four seasons.

After a tenure near home in 2004, in FK Haugesund, he settled in Eastern Norway and played seven seasons for Notodden FK interrupted by one season in Mjøndalen IF, then hobby-level football for Drammen FK, SBK Skiold and Åskollen FK.
