= Athanasios Pangouras =

Greek footballer

Personal information
- Date of birth: 3 June 1971 (age 55)
- Position: Defender

Senior career*
Years	Team	Apps	(Gls)
1996–1998	Veria		
1998–1999	Ionikos		
2000	Apollon Smyrnis		
- * Club domestic league appearances and goals

Athanasios Pangouras (Greek: Αθανάσιος Παγγούρας; born 3 June 1971) is a retired Greek football defender.
