= Municipal Stadium of Karditsa =

Multi-purpose stadium in Karditsa, Greece

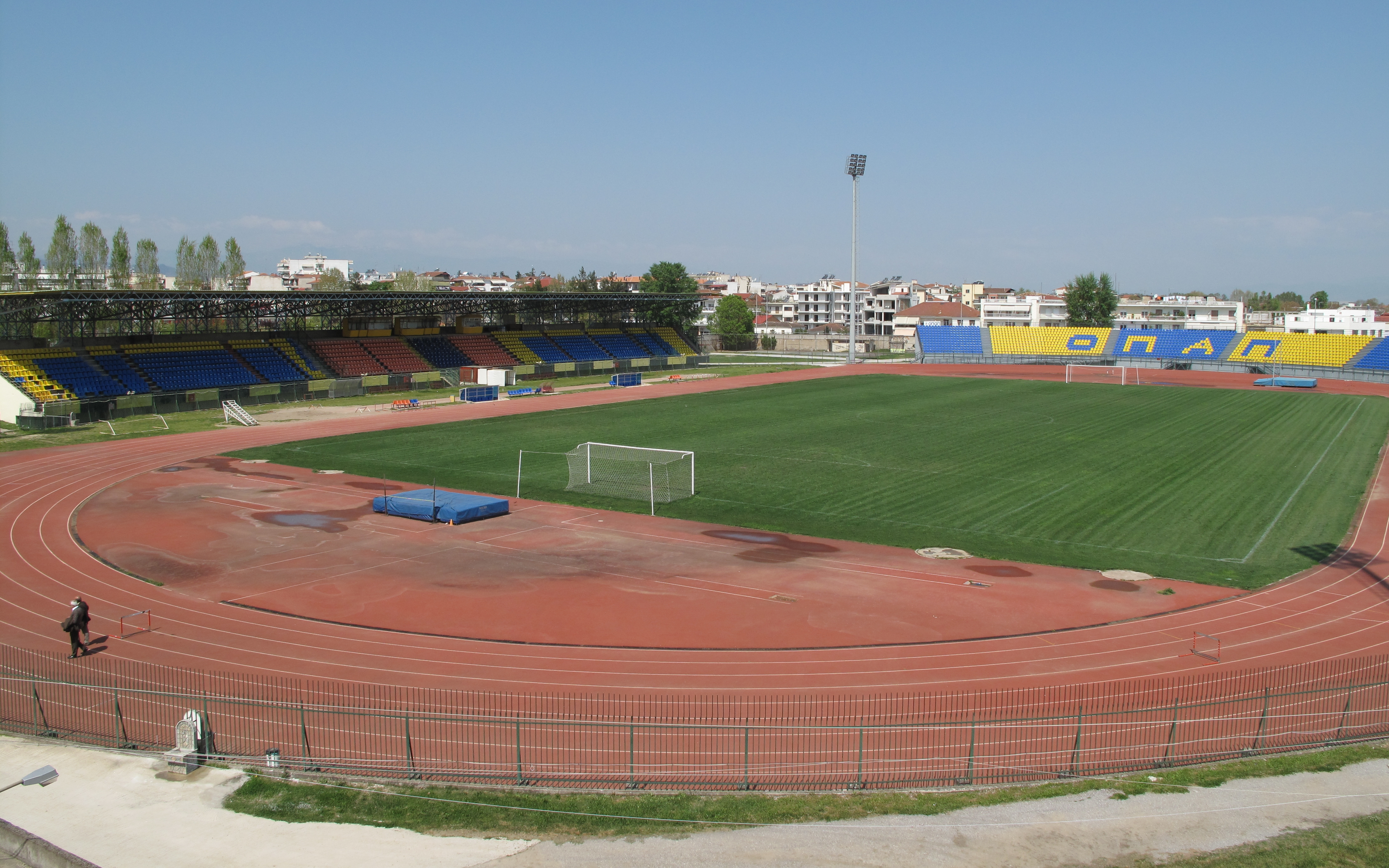
- Interactive map of Municipal Stadium of Karditsa
- Full name: Municipal Stadium of Karditsa
- Location: Karditsa, Thessaly, Greece
- Coordinates: 39.362552°N 21.935127°E
- Owner: Municipality of Karditsa
- Capacity: 3,500
- Surface: Grass
- Record attendance: 52,890(1994-95 season)

Construction
- Built: 1930

Tenant
- Anagennisi Karditsa

Municipal Stadium of Karditsa (Greek: Δημοτικό Στάδιο Καρδίτσας) is a multi-purpose stadium in Karditsa, Thessaly, Greece.

== History ==
The history of the Municipal Stadium of Karditsa is identical to the history of the football field in the wider region as it is the oldest sports venue in Thessaly. As early as the early 1930s, the area next to Larissa Street acquires athletic life. Wooden beams, gravel, knitted leather ball, are the middle of the season. In the mid-1970s, the first concrete block (today's eastern platform) was built at that time (without seating) of about 5,000 spectators. As the years passed, the land of neighboring cities grew more and more so, in the mid-1980s, the grounds of Volos, Larissa and Trikala had horseshoes, headlights and lawns. At the same time, the Stadium of Karditsa remains with a dirt field, but a second concrete block (today's western platform) of the same capacity with the older East is being built, bringing the total capacity of about 10,000 spectators. The turf will appear shortly afterwards. In 1995, a journalist was placed on the western platform. During the 2006–07 season at Karditsa Stadium will be placed plastic seats and a shelter on the western platform and headlights (which will operate for the first time in 2008). With seat seating, the western stand was limited to a capacity of 3,500 spectators, reducing the total to 7,500. The eastern platform (the old one), since the summer of 2005, would be decided to close because it was deemed inappropriate to host supporters. In November 2009, the construction of new changing rooms under the western ramp (replacing the old ones under the inappropriate eastern platform) was completed, and in early 2010 the construction of a new metal platform in the shape of a petal behind its northern hearth stadium. In January 2016, it was decided to reopen the eastern platform of the stadium and this resulted in the stadium's capacity to increase in 13.000.

== Gallery ==
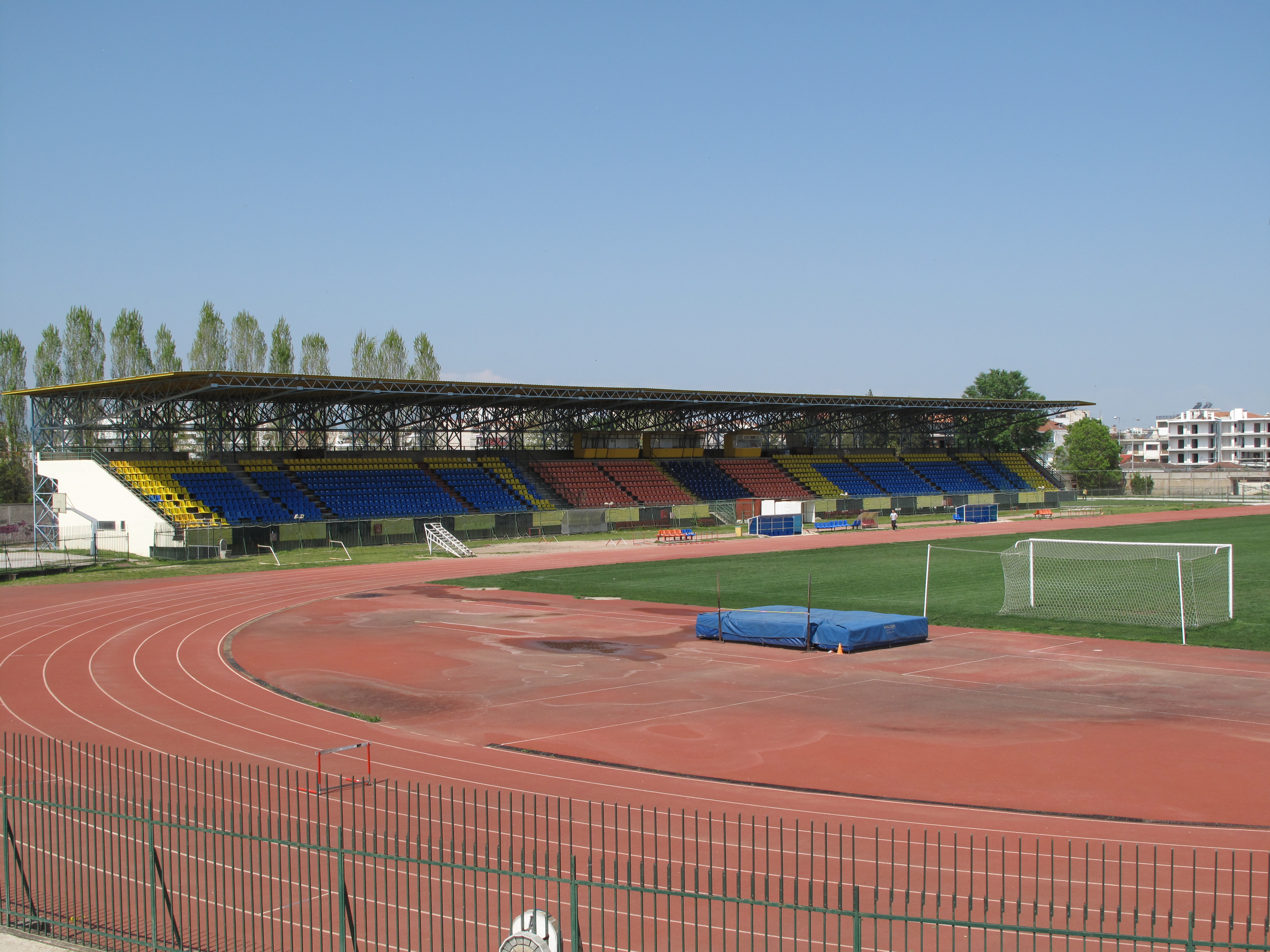
West stand

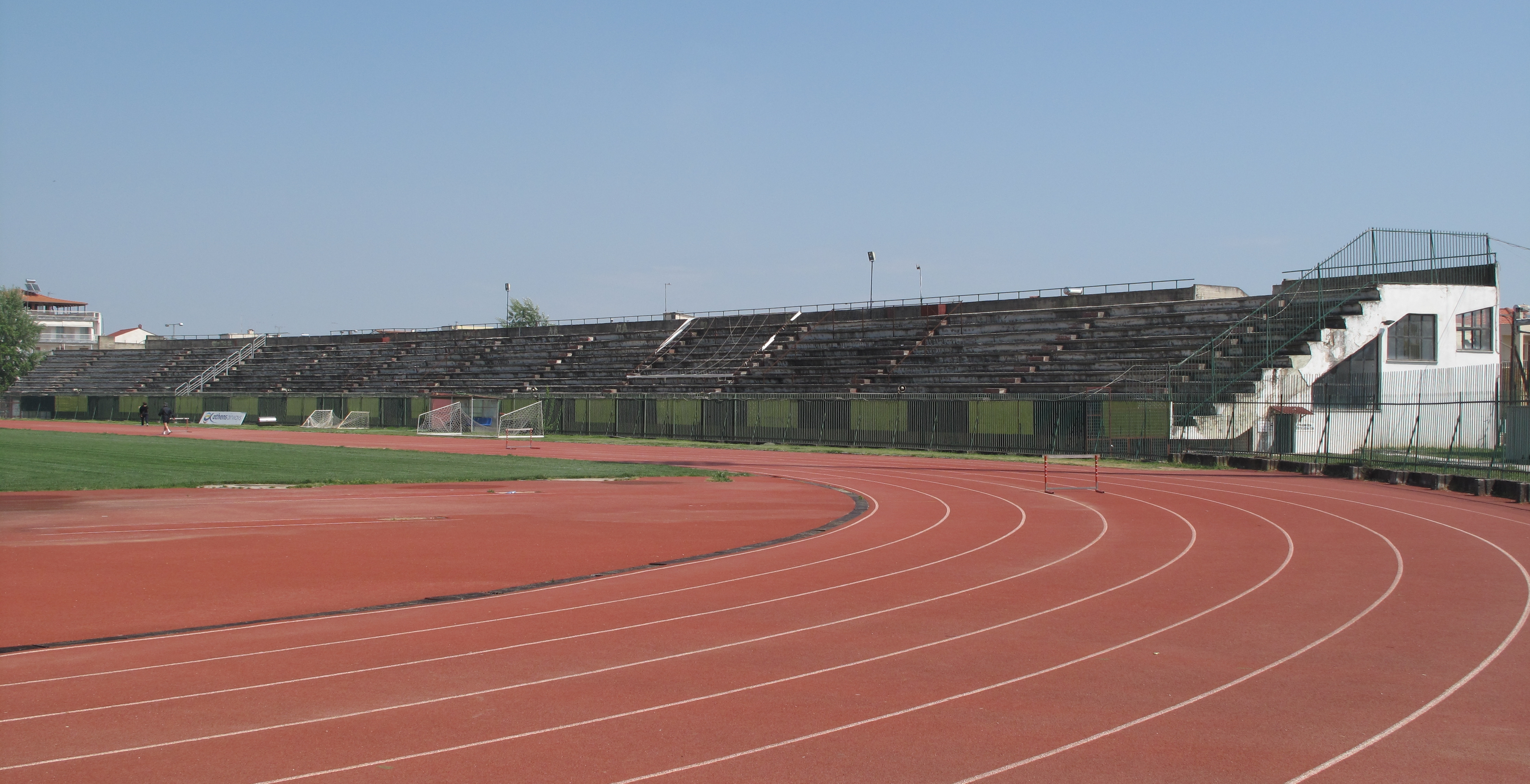
East stand

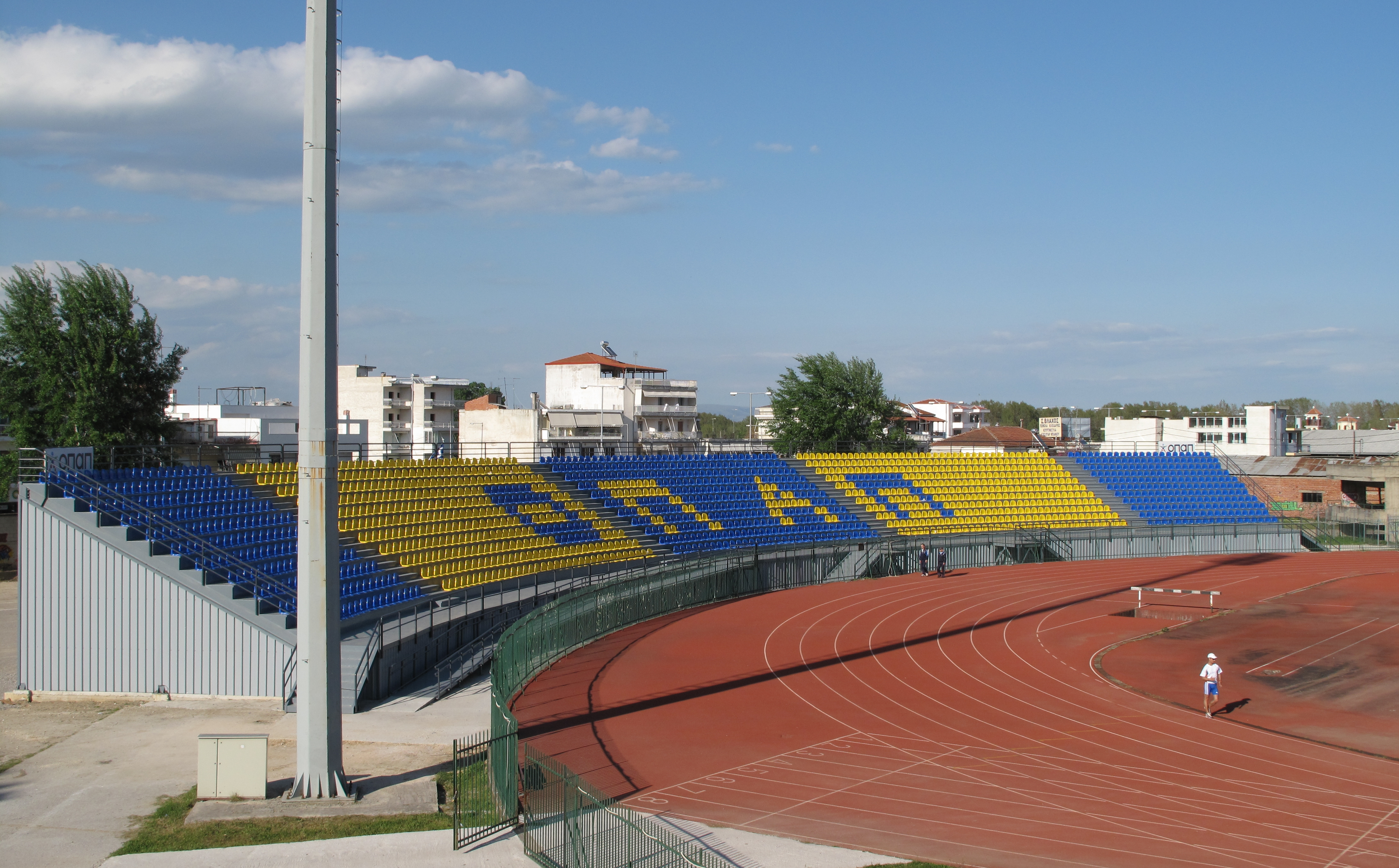
North stand
