= César Rosales =

Peruvian footballer (born 1970)

Personal information
- Full name: César Miguel Rosales Tardío
- Date of birth: 9 November 1970 (age 55)
- Place of birth: Lima, Peru
- Height: 1.75 m (5 ft 9 in)
- Position: Midfielder

Senior career*
Years	Team	Apps	(Gls)
1989–1990	León de Huánuco	20	(10)
1992–1995	Ciclista Lima	30	(25)
1995–1998	Alianza Lima	40	(30)
1998–2000	Paniliakos	71	(11)
2000–2001	Kavala	30	(10)
2002–2003	Fostiras	25	(10)
2003–2005	Agios Dimitrios	25	(19)
2005–2007	Vyzas Megara	80	(55)

International career
1994–1997	Peru	4	(0)

Managerial career
- 2008–2009: Vyzas Megara
- * Club domestic league appearances and goals

César Miguel Rosales Tardío (born 9 November 1970 in Lima, Peru) is a former Peruvian footballer.

== Club career ==
Rosales played for a number of clubs in Peru, including Ciclista Lima and Alianza Lima. He also had a spell with Paniliakos in the Super League Greece.

== International career ==
Rosales made four appearances for the senior Peru national football team from 1994 to 1997.
