= Darío Muchotrigo =

Peruvian footballer (born 1970)

Personal information
- Full name: Darío Teodoro Muchotrigo Carrillo
- Date of birth: 17 December 1970 (age 55)
- Place of birth: Lima, Peru
- Height: 1.75 m (5 ft 9 in)
- Position: Forward

Senior career*
Years	Team	Apps	(Gls)
1990–1996	Alianza Lima		
1996–1997	Tecos	8	(0)
1997–1998	Juan Aurich		
1998–2001	Ionikos	81	(13)
2001	Juan Aurich		
2002	Estudiantes de Medicina	18	(2)
2003	Charlotte Eagles	7	(1)
2004	Deportivo Pereira	3	(0)
2005	Universidad San Martín	4	(0)
2005–2006	Unión Huaral	21	(2)
2006	Charlotte Eagles		

International career
1993–2001	Peru	24	(1)
- * Club domestic league appearances and goals

Darío Teodoro Muchotrigo Carrillo (born 17 December 1970, in Lima) is a Peruvian retired footballer.

== Club career ==
Muchotrigo played for a number of clubs in Peru, including Alianza Lima and Juan Aurich. He also had spells with Tecos in the Primera División de México and Ionikos in the Super League Greece.

== International career ==
Muchotrigo made 24 appearances for the senior Peru national football team from 1993 to 2001.
