= Dimitrios Afentoulidis =

Greek footballer

Personal information
- Date of birth: 21 July 1974 (age 52)
- Place of birth: Kastoria, Greece
- Height: 1.76 m (5 ft 9 in)
- Position: Midfielder

Senior career*
Years	Team	Apps	(Gls)
1994–1997	Kastoria		
1997–2000	Ionikos		
2001–2002?	Chalkidona		
2002–2003?	Marko		
2003–?	Vyzas		
- * Club domestic league appearances and goals

Dimitrios Afentoulidis (Greek: Δημήτριος Αφεντουλίδης; born 21 July 1974) is a Greek former professional footballer who played as a midfielder. His father is Anestis Afentoulidis.
