= 1997–98 AEK Athens F.C. season =

AEK Athens
1997–98 season
- Chairman: Alexis Kougias (until 10 October); Lakis Nikolaou
- Manager: Dumitru Dumitriu (until 2 April); Antonis Minou
- Stadium: Nikos Goumas Stadium
- Alpha Ethniki: 3rd
- Greek Cup: Round of 32
- UEFA Cup Winners' Cup: Quarter-finals
- Top goalscorer: League: Demis Nikolaidis (19); All: Demis Nikolaidis (21)
- Highest home attendance: 24,367 vs Lokomotiv Moscow (5 March 1998)
- Lowest home attendance: 2,271 vs Apollon Athens (23 March 1998)
- Average home league attendance: 11,020
- Biggest win: AEK Athens 5–0 Dinaburg
- Biggest defeat: AEK Athens 0–2 Ionikos; AEK Athens 0–2 Skoda Xanthi
Home colours

The 1997–98 season was the 74th season in the existence of AEK Athens F.C. and the 39th consecutive season in the top flight of Greek football. They competed in the Alpha Ethniki, the Greek Cup and the UEFA Cup Winners' Cup. The season began on 31 August 1997 and finished on 17 May 1998.

== Overview ==
In the summer of 1997, Michalis Trochanas, no longer able to bear the weight of managing the club, but also with the vast majority of the supporters against him, unsuccessfully looked for a buyer, putting the lawyer, Alexis Kougias as president. The team lost 2 more important players, Temur Ketsbaia and Vasilios Borbokis, who left for England. In addition, Stelios Manolas, who was against the club's major shareholder, did not join in the team at the start of the season. On the other hand, Giannis Kalitzakis, Arnar Grétarsson, Evripidis Katsavos, Theodoros Alexis and Vangelis Kefalas were transferred to the club. The first gathering of the team was episodic with about 2,000 fans gathered, "boiling" against the administration. Tensions and incidents occurred between the supporters, with Alexis Kougias and Vasilis Karagiannis being the main victims. The season started with these adverse conditions and the Romanian manager Dumitru Dumitriu.

The team started the Championship relatively well and after a few months the psychology of the crowd rose, since Michalis Trochanas eventually sold his shares to the financially powerful, English multinational ENIC. The former player of AEK, Lakis Nikolaou took over as president, Manolas returned to the team and rich contract renewals and in January some transfers were made. Despite being the winter champions, AEK were affected by the injuries on the roster, left quite behind in the league table and eventually could not claim the title from Olympiacos. Towards the end of the season, Dumitriu was fired, who had already started to have problems with the administration, during the January transfer window. In his position, as an interim, Antonis Minou was hired to close the season.

In the Cup, AEK, after passing through the first two rounds without a match, were drawn against Skoda Xanthi for the round of 32. There, they were eliminated with defeats at both legs.

AEK, taking advantage of their good coefficient in the UEFA ranking, had a good draw in the UEFA Cup Winners' Cup coming against Dinaburg from Latvia. The absence of Nikolaidis, affected the team's performance against the Latvians. In the "cold" Nikos Goumas Stadium Dinaburg kept resting the yellow-blacks, but after the dismissal of their goalkeeper shortly after half an hour of match, AEK scatered the Latvians with 5 goals, clearly turning the rematch into a formal procedure. The rematch in Daugava Stadium went as expected with AEK winning by 2–4 and their qualification was completed. Their next opponent were the Sturm Graz. At Nea Filadelfeia the game was lopsided as expected, but in the end the stadium played its part and AEK took a safe score with two goals in the last quarter of the game. Unfortunately, the game marked the career of Christos Kostis, who in a collision with Sidorchuk was seriously injured, never managing to fully recover. The rematch at Arnold Schwarzenegger Stadium was more difficult than Dumitriu and his footballers expected. Sturm pressed, toiled and were well set up on the pitch. Nevertheless, they achieved nothing more than scoring a goal 8 minutes before the end of the match. In the quarter-finals AEK came across Lokomotiv Moscow for the first time and in one of the biggest challenges in their history. In a full Nea Filadelfeia Stadium AEK were seeking for a qualifying score in order to make the rematch an easy task. However, the yellow-blacks were not performing as expected, having a bad day and at the same time facing a suffocating pressure and overlap from the defense of the guests. AEK did not reach a goal and ended the match with 9 players, due to the dismissal of Doboș at the 75th minute and Vaios Karagiannis in the stoppage time. Despite the 0–0 first leg, the yellow-blacks were going to Moscow to qualify for the semi-finals. The team started the game numbly, but went to the locker rooms for half-time with a 0–0 draw. The hosts were pressing and in the 53rd minute made the score 1–0. AEK were getting up and missing a lot of chances and at the 66th minute, their pressure paid off and Maladenis won a penalty which Kopitsis converted into a goal. AEK had the qualification in their hands and had imposed themselves over Lokomotiv. The Russians were pressing and left their defenses exposed, with the counterattacks of AEK reaching the opposing area with claims, but either the final pass or the final effort was bad, since anxiety and nervousness were evident in their game. At the 90th minute, Sebwe made a run with the ball at his feet, neutralized everyone and passed to Nikolaidis. The opposing goalkeeper was eliminated and the striker of AEK had to score one of the easiest and most important goals of his career. Either out of overconfidence or out of too much anxiety, he took a lifeless shot from the small area, but his finish was bad and weak, which was caught by a Lokomotiv defender who came behind him and recovered the ball. Afterwards, in the last phase of the match Lokomotiv entered the area of AEK and after many counters, bad clearances of the defenders and constant crosses somehow the ball ended up in the net of Atmatsidis, leaving AEK unexpectedly out of the tournament in a qualification that would have been historic.

One of the highlights of the season the unprecedented "absolute" in derby victories against Olympiacos and Panathinaikos, at both home and away. Additionally, the end of the season was marked by the retirement of Stelios Manolas, after 19 years of service to the club. The top scorer of the season for AEK was Demis Nikolaidis with 19 goals.

== Management team ==
Position	Staff
Manager	(Greece) Antonis Minou
Goalkeeping coach	(Greece) Lakis Stergioudas
Fitness coach	(Greece) Georgios Vamvakas
Academy director	(Greece) Andreas Stamatiadis
Academy manager	(Greece) Giorgos Karafeskos
Head of Medical	(Greece) Lakis Nikolaou

== Players ==
=== Squad information ===
NOTE: The players are the ones that have been announced by the AEK Athens' press release. No edits should be made unless a player arrival or exit is announced. Updated 17 May 1998, 23:59 UTC+3.

No.	Player	Nat.	Position(s)	Date of birth (Age)	Signed	Previous club	Transfer fee	Contract until
Goalkeepers
1	Ilias Atmatsidis	(Greece)	GK	24 April 1969 (aged 29)	1992	(Greece) Pontioi Veria	₯40,000,000	1999
15	Chrysostomos Michailidis	(Greece)	GK	15 January 1975 (aged 23)	1997	(Greece) Eordaikos	Free	2002
22	Vasilis Karagiannis	(Greece)	GK	27 September 1969 (aged 28)	1993	(Greece) Diagoras	₯20,000,000	1998
26	Dionysis Chiotis	(Greece)	GK	4 June 1977 (aged 21)	1995	(Greece) AEK Athens U20	—	2005
Defenders
3	Michalis Kasapis	(Greece)	LB / LM	6 August 1971 (aged 26)	1993	(Greece) Levadiakos	₯25,000,000	2002
4	Anton Doboș	(Romania)	CB	13 October 1965 (aged 32)	1996	(Romania) Steaua București	₯60,000,000	1999
5	Nikos Kostenoglou (Vice-captain 2)	(Greece)	CB / RB	3 October 1970 (aged 27)	1994	(Greece) Skoda Xanthi	₯70,000,000	2003
9	Georgios Koutoulas	(Greece)	CB / LB	9 February 1967 (aged 31)	1987	(Greece) AEK Athens U20	—	1999
12	Charis Kopitsis	(Greece)	RB / RM / LB / LM	5 March 1969 (aged 29)	1992	(Greece) Panionios	Free	2001
13	Vaios Karagiannis (Vice-captain)	(Greece)	LB / CB	25 June 1968 (aged 30)	1990	(Greece) A.O. Karditsa	₯11,000,000	2000
23	Vangelis Kefalas	(Greece)	CB / DM	31 July 1973 (aged 24)	1997	(Greece) Apollon Athens	Free	2000
25	Giannis Kalitzakis	(Greece)	CB	10 February 1966 (aged 32)	1997	(Greece) Panathinaikos	₯23,800,000	2000
29	Stelios Manolas (Captain)	(Greece)	CB / RB	13 July 1961 (aged 36)	1980	(Greece) AEK Athens U20	—	1998
Midfielders
2	Triantafyllos Macheridis	(Greece)	DM / CB / RB / LB	10 November 1973 (aged 24)	1996	(Greece) Skoda Xanthi	₯100,000,000	2001
7	Christos Maladenis	(Greece)	CM / RM / LM / AM / DM / RW / LW / SS	23 May 1974 (aged 24)	1995	(Greece) Skoda Xanthi	₯100,000,000	2000
8	Toni Savevski	(North Macedonia)	CM / LM / DM	14 July 1963 (aged 34)	1988	(North Macedonia) Vardar	₯34,000,000	1999
18	Evripidis Katsavos	(Greece)	CM / DM / RM	14 September 1973 (aged 24)	1997	(Greece) Veria	Free	2001
19	Mattheos Platakis	(Greece)	AM / ST / SS	30 June 1977 (aged 21)	1996	(Greece) Phinikas Polichini	Free	2000
24	Arnar Grétarsson	(Iceland)	CM / DM	20 February 1972 (aged 26)	1997	(Iceland) Leiftur	Free	2000
27	Giorgos Passios	(Greece) (Australia)	DM / CM / CB	4 May 1980 (aged 18)	1997	(Greece) AEK Athens U20	—	2003
30	Kelvin Sebwe	(Liberia)	AM / SS	4 April 1972 (aged 26)	1997	(Greece) Skoda Xanthi	₯350,000,000	2003
Forwards
10	Christos Kostis	(Greece)	SS / ST / AM / RW / LW	15 January 1972 (aged 26)	1994	(Greece) Iraklis	₯350,000,000	1998
11	Demis Nikolaidis	(Greece) (Germany)	ST / SS	17 September 1973 (aged 24)	1996	(Greece) Apollon Athens	₯330,000,000	1999
20	Daniel Batista	(Greece) (Cape Verde)	ST / SS / AM	9 September 1964 (aged 33)	1995	(Greece) Olympiacos	Free	1998
21	Marcelo Veridiano	(Brazil)	ST / SS	30 June 1966 (aged 32)	1996	(Greece) Skoda Xanthi	₯35,000,000	1998
28	Georgios Donis	(Greece) (Germany)	RW / RM	22 October 1969 (aged 28)	1997	(England) Blackburn Rovers	Free	2003
31	Goran Tomić	(Croatia)	ST	18 March 1977 (aged 21)	1998	(Italy) Vicenza	₯80,000,000	1998
Left during Winter Transfer Window
6	Michalis Vlachos	(Greece)	CB / DM	20 September 1967 (aged 30)	1993	(Greece) Olympiacos	Free	2000
16	Konstantinos Pavlopoulos	(Greece)	CB	2 July 1968 (aged 29)	1995	(Greece) OFI	Free	1998
14	Theodoros Alexis	(Greece)	RM	6 May 1975 (aged 23)	1997	(Greece) Apollon Athens	Free	2001

== Transfers ==
=== In ===
==== Summer ====
No.	Pos.	Player	From	Fee	Date	Contract Until	Source
14	MF	(Greece) Theodoros Alexis	(Greece) Apollon Athens	Free transfer	7 July 1997	30 June 2001	
15	GK	(Greece) Chrysostomos Michailidis	(Greece) Eordaikos	Free transfer	1 July 1997	30 June 2002	
18	MF	(Greece) Evripidis Katsavos	(Greece) Veria	Free transfer	31 July 1997	30 June 2001	
23	DF	(Greece) Vangelis Kefalas	(Greece) Apollon Athens	Free transfer	7 July 1997	30 June 2000	
24	MF	(Iceland) Arnar Grétarsson	(Iceland) Leiftur	Free transfer	8 August 1997	30 June 2000	
25	DF	(Greece) Giannis Kalitzakis	(Greece) Panathinaikos	₯23,800,000	1 July 1997	30 June 2000	
27	MF	(Greece) Giorgos Passios	(Greece) AEK Athens U20	Promotion	1 July 1997	30 June 2003	
—	DF	(Greece) Georgios Theodoridis	(Greece) Edessaikos	Loan return	1 July 1997	30 June 1997	

==== Winter ====
No.	Pos.	Player	From	Fee	Date	Contract Until	Source
28	FW	(Greece) Georgios Donis	(England) Blackburn Rovers	Free transfer	12 December 1997	30 June 2003	
30	MF	(Liberia) Kelvin Sebwe	(Greece) Skoda Xanthi	₯350,000,000	12 December 1997	31 December 2003	

=== Out ===
==== Summer ====
No.	Pos.	Player	To	Fee	Date	Source
—	DF	(Greece) Georgios Theodoridis	(Greece) Doxa Vyronas	Free transfer	31 July 1997	
—	DF	(Greece) Vasilios Borbokis	(England) Sheffield United	₯400,000,000	23 June 1997	
—	MF	(Georgia (country)) Temur Ketsbaia	(England) Newcastle United	End of contract	7 July 1997	

==== Winter ====
No.	Pos.	Player	To	Fee	Date	Source
6	DF	(Greece) Michalis Vlachos	(England) Portsmouth	Contract termination	29 January 1998	
16	DF	(Greece) Konstantinos Pavlopoulos	(Greece) OFI	Contract termination	15 January 1998	

=== Loan in ===
==== Winter ====
No.	Pos.	Player	From	Fee	Date	Until	Option to buy	Source
31	FW	(Croatia) Goran Tomić	(Italy) Vicenza	₯80,000,000	3 February 1998	30 June 1998	✓	

=== Loan out ===
==== Summer ====
No.	Pos.	Player	To	Fee	Date	Until	Option to buy	Source
—	FW	(Greece) Giorgos Kartalis	(Greece) Aris Petroupolis	Free	1 August 1997	30 June 1998	✗	
—	FW	(Greece) Ilias Anastasakos	(Greece) Aris Petroupolis	Free	1 August 1997	30 June 1998	✗	

==== Winter ====
No.	Pos.	Player	To	Fee	Date	Until	Option to buy	Source
14	MF	(Greece) Theodoros Alexis	(Greece) Athinaikos	Free	15 January 1998	30 June 1998	✗	

=== Contract renewals ===
No.	Pos.	Player	Date	Former Exp. Date	New Exp. Date	Source
3	DF	(Greece) Michalis Kasapis	16 October 1997	30 June 1998	30 June 2002	
5	DF	(Greece) Nikos Kostenoglou	14 October 1997	30 June 1998	30 June 2003	
12	DF	(Greece) Charis Kopitsis	14 October 1997	30 November 1997	31 December 2001	
29	DF	(Greece) Stelios Manolas	29 December 1997	30 June 1997	30 June 1998	

=== Overall transfer activity ===
==== Expenditure ====
Summer: ▼ ₯103,800,000

Winter: ▼ ₯350,000,000

Total: ▼ ₯553,800,000

==== Income ====
Summer: ▲ ₯400,000,000

Winter: ▲ ₯0

Total: ▲ ₯412,000,000

==== Net Totals ====
Summer: ▲ ₯296,200,000

Winter: ▼ ₯350,000,000

Total: ▼ ₯53,800,000

== Pre-season and friendlies ==
13 July 1997 Friendly	Fenerbahçe	2–1	AEK Athens	Munchen
	Okocha 19'; Elgor 57'	Report	Nikolaidis 45'	Stadium: Delta Stadion; Attendance: 3,000

15 July 1997 Friendly	Miesbach	0–2	AEK Athens	Miesbach
		Report	Grétarsson 14'; Batista 65'	Stadium: Sportanlage Windfeld

17 July 1997 Friendly	Rottach-Egern	1–7	AEK Athens	Rottach-Egern
19:00 EEST (UTC+3)	75'	Report	Kopitsis 15' (pen.); Batista 22'; Kasapis 35'; Marcelo 55'; Kefalas 80'; Grétarsson 81'; Alexis 84'	Stadium: Birkenmoos Stadion

23 July 1997 Friendly	Türkgücü München	3–1	AEK Athens	Munich
20:00 EEST (UTC+3)	20'; 76'; 80'	Report	Platakis 79'	Stadium: Daden Stadion

27 July 1997 Friendly	Herakles Munchen	0–8	AEK Athens	Tegernsee
12:00 EEST (UTC+3)		Report	Nikolaidis 4', 28'; Macheridis 9'; Koutoulas 18'; Batista 73', 76'; Platakis 82'; Kefalas 85'

4 August 1997 Friendly	AEK Athens	2–1	Iraklis	Nea Filadelfeia
21:00 EEST (UTC+3)	C. Kostis 4'; Doboș 64'	Report	Konstantinidis 76'	Stadium: Nikos Goumas Stadium; Attendance: 7,000; Referee: Nikos Iliadis (Piraeus)

6 August 1997 Friendly	AEK Athens	2–2	Boavista	Nea Filadelfeia
21:00 EEST (UTC+3)	Kalitzakis 29', (yellow card); Nikolaidis 57'	Report	Litos (yellow card); Miguel 50'; Ayew (red card) 65'; Simić 88'	Stadium: Nikos Goumas Stadium; Attendance: 3,122; Referee: Georgios Psychomanis (Athens)

11 August 1997 Friendly	AEK Athens	5–0	Kavala	Nea Filadelfeia
21:00 EEST (UTC+3)	Maladenis 14'; Marcelo 39'; Kasapis 60'; Nikolaidis 81', 88'	Report		Stadium: Nikos Goumas Stadium; Referee: Dionysis Stefanopoulos (Piraeus)

13 August 1997 Friendly	Proodeftiki	1–1	AEK Athens	Nikaia
18:00 EEST (UTC+3)	Abelas 52'	Report	Kopitsis (yellow card); Savevski 4', (yellow card)	Stadium: Nikaia Municipal Stadium; Attendance: 1,002; Referee: Giannis Abelakias (Thessaly)

18 August 1997 Friendly	Ionikos	4–1	AEK Athens	Nikaia
18:00 EEST (UTC+3)	Andrioli (yellow card); Frousos 14', 52'; Kljajević 26' (pen.); Afash 48'	Report	Maladenis 8'; Savevski (red card) 34'	Stadium: Neapoli Stadium; Referee: Giorgos Kasnaferis (Athens)

20 August 1997 Friendly	AEK Athens	3–2	Panachaiki	Nea Filadelfeia
21:00 EEST (UTC+3)	Maladenis 26', 71' (pen.), 90'	Report	Palapanis 16'; Klejch 68'	Stadium: Nikos Goumas Stadium; Attendance: 1,126; Referee: Dimitris Kalyvas (Boeotia)

27 August 1997 Friendly	AEK Athens	1–0	Panetolikos	Nea Filadelfeia
19:00 EEST (UTC+3)	Nikolaidis 23'	Report		Stadium: Nikos Goumas Stadium; Attendance: 1,701; Referee: Kleomenis Bontiotis (Athens)

28 January 1998 Friendly	AEK Athens	1–0	Ethnikos Asteras	Thrakomakedones
15:00 EEST (UTC+3)	Maladenis 45'	Report		Stadium: AEK Athens' Training Complex
Note: 75-minute match (Three 25-minute periods).

26 May 1998 Friendly	AEK Athens	2–1	Akratitos	Thrakomakedones
	Macheridis 15'; Marcelo 30'	Report	Doudoumis 5'	Stadium: AEK Athens' Training Complex
Note: 60-minute match.

== Competitions ==
=== Overall record ===
Competition	First match	Last match	Starting round	Final position	Record							
Competition	First match	Last match	Starting round	Final position	Pld	W	D	L	GF	GA	GD	Win %
Alpha Ethniki	31 August 1997	17 May 1998	Matchday 1	3rd	34	22	8	4	61	30	+31	64.71
Greek Cup	19 November 1997	3 December 1997	Round of 32	Round of 32	2	0	0	2	1	4	−3	0.00
UEFA Cup Winners' Cup	18 September 1997	19 March 1998	First round	Quarter-finals	4	1	1	2	12	5	+7	25.00
Total					40	23	9	8	74	39	+35	57.50

Last updated: 17 May 1998
Source: Competitions

=== Alpha Ethniki ===
==== League table ====
Pos	Team	Pld	W	D	L	GF	GA	GD	Pts	Qualification or relegation
1	Olympiacos (C)	34	29	1	4	88	27	+61	88	Qualification for Champions League second qualifying round
2	Panathinaikos	34	28	1	5	90	24	+66	85	Qualification for Champions League second qualifying round
3	AEK Athens	34	22	8	4	61	30	+31	74	Qualification for UEFA Cup second qualifying round
4	PAOK	34	21	7	6	74	41	+33	70	Qualification for UEFA Cup second qualifying round
5	Ionikos	34	18	8	8	46	31	+15	62	

Source: RSSSF
Rules for classification: 1st points; 2nd head-to-head points; 3rd head-to-head goal difference; 4th decision match.
(C) Champions

==== Results summary ====
Overall								Home						Away					
Pld	W	D	L	GF	GA	GD	Pts	W	D	L	GF	GA	GD	W	D	L	GF	GA	GD
34	22	8	4	61	30	+31	74	12	2	3	33	15	+18	10	6	1	28	15	+13

Source: Competitive matches

==== Results by Matchday ====
Round	1	2	3	4	5	6	7	8	9	10	11	12	13	14	15	16	17	18	19	20	21	22	23	24	25	26	27	28	29	30	31	32	33	34
Ground	A	H	A	H	A	H	H	A	H	A	H	A	H	A	A	H	A	H	A	H	A	H	A	A	H	A	H	A	H	A	H	H	A	H
Result	D	W	W	W	W	L	W	W	W	W	W	W	W	W	W	W	D	W	L	W	D	D	D	W	L	W	W	D	L	W	D	W	D	W
Position	9	6	4	4	3	3	3	3	3	1	1	1	1	1	1	1	1	1	2	1	3	3	3	3	3	3	3	3	3	3	3	3	3	3

Source: Competitive matches
A = Away; H = Home; W = Win; D = Draw; L = Loss; P = Postponed

==== Matches ====
31 August 1997 1	PAOK	0–0	AEK Athens	Thessaloniki
19:00 EEST (UTC+3)	Olivares (yellow card)		Macheridis (yellow card) 40'; Batista (yellow card) 75'	Stadium: Toumba Stadium; Attendance: 30,347; Referee: Ilias Chatzis (Karditsa)

14 September 1997 2	AEK Athens	2–1	Proodeftiki	Nea Filadelfeia
18:45 EEST (UTC+3)	Kostenoglou (yellow card); Maladenis (yellow card); Macheridis (yellow card); Kostis 23' (pen.), 63'		Giannopoulos (yellow card); Chouzouris (yellow card); Bairamoglou 77'	Stadium: Nikos Goumas Stadium; Attendance: 13,028; Referee: Giorgos Borovilos (Arcadia)

22 September 1997 3	Olympiacos	0–1	AEK Athens	Marousi
20:00 EEST (UTC+3)	Dabizas (yellow card)		Katsavos (yellow card); Savevski (yellow card); Kasapis (yellow card) 15'; Nikolaidis 60'	Stadium: Olympic Stadium; Attendance: 31,470; Referee: Grigoris Kechagias (Thessaloniki)

28 September 1997 4	AEK Athens	1–0	Kavala	Nea Filadelfeia
15:45 EEST (UTC+3)	Kalitzakis (yellow card); Kopitsis 36'		Kallimanis (yellow card); Athanasiadis (yellow card)	Stadium: Nikos Goumas Stadium; Attendance: 13,252; Referee: Spyros Papadakos (Laconia)

6 October 1997 5	Iraklis	1–4	AEK Athens	Thessaloniki
18:00 EEST (UTC+3)	Xhumba (yellow card); Gonias 52' (pen.), (penalty missed) 60'		Maladenis (yellow card); C. Kostis 25', 81'; Savevski 34'; Nikolaidis 35'	Stadium: Kaftanzoglio Stadium; Attendance: 10,057; Referee: Manolis Giannadakis (Lasithi)

19 October 1997 6	AEK Athens	0–2	Ionikos	Nea Filadelfeia
21:00 EEST (UTC+3)	Macheridis (yellow card) 30'; Nikolaidis (yellow card) 42'; Doboș (yellow card) 65'; Maladenis (yellow card) 74'		Daraklitsas 25', (red card) 73'; Afash (yellow card) 34'; Stamatis 68'; Andrioli (yellow card) 71'	Stadium: Nikos Goumas Stadium; Attendance: 8,614; Referee: Malamas Tevekelis (Thessaloniki)

27 October 1997 7	AEK Athens	2–1	Panathinaikos	Nea Filadelfeia
20:00 EET (UTC+2)	Vlachos (yellow card); Doboș (yellow card); Atmatsidis (yellow card); Savevski 42'; Nikolaidis 73'		Lagonikakis (yellow card); Mykland (yellow card); Konstantinidis (yellow card); Georgiadis 50' (pen.)	Stadium: Nikos Goumas Stadium; Attendance: 19,516; Referee: Naoum Mintiouris (Serres)

2 November 1997 8	Paniliakos	2–4	AEK Athens	Pyrgos
15:00 EET (UTC+2)	Lakis (yellow card); Koloskopis (yellow card); Nikolić (yellow card); Troupkos (yellow card); Barniak 7', 35'		Kostenoglou (yellow card) 30'; Maladenis 57'; Batista 59', 70'; Kopitsis 74'	Stadium: Pyrgos Stadium; Attendance: 4,443; Referee: Spyros Papadakos (Laconia)

10 November 1997 9	AEK Athens	2–0	Panionios	Nea Filadelfeia
18:00 EET (UTC+2)	Nikolaidis 7'; Savevski 17'		Ioannidis (yellow card); Tzanetis (yellow card); Kamitsis (yellow card)	Stadium: Nikos Goumas Stadium; Attendance: 7,522; Referee: Kyros Vassaras (Thessaloniki)

15 November 1997 10	Apollon Athens	3–4	AEK Athens	Rizoupoli
15:00 EET (UTC+2)	Dikoumé 9', 62'; Damigos (yellow card) 21'; Damjanović (yellow card) 31'; Konstantinidis (yellow card) 59' (yellow-red card) 65'; Bushi (yellow card) 70'; Tatsis 90+1'		Nikolaidis 21', 67', 72', (yellow card) 51'; Batista 32'; Marcelo (yellow card) 47'; Kasapis (yellow card) 56'; Kopitsis (yellow card) 70'; Katsavos (yellow card) 81'	Stadium: Rizoupoli Stadium; Attendance: 4,207; Referee: Giorgos Kasnaferis (Athens)

23 November 1997 11	AEK Athens	5–1	Panachaiki	Nea Filadelfeia
19:00 EET (UTC+2)	Marcelo 15'; Savevski 57'; Nikolaidis 69'; Kyriakopoulos 73' (o.g.); Batista 77'		Kalla (yellow card) 30'; Vaitsis (yellow card) 54'; Klejch 85'	Stadium: Nikos Goumas Stadium; Attendance: 9,492; Referee: Giorgos Borovilos (Arcadia)

29 November 1997 12	Veria	1–2	AEK Athens	Veria
15:00 EET (UTC+2)	Pangouras (yellow card); Troupkos 6'		Katsavos (yellow card); Vlachos (yellow card); Kasapis (yellow card); Nikolaidis 30', (yellow card); Maladenis 58'	Stadium: Veria Stadium; Attendance: 2,570; Referee: Grigoris Kechagias (Thessaloniki)

7 December 1997 13	AEK Athens	2–1	Ethnikos Piraeus	Nea Filadelfeia
15:00 EET (UTC+2)	Kalitzakis (yellow card); Katsavos (yellow card); Nikolaidis 25' (pen.); Batista 39'		Vouzas (yellow card); Stavrakakis 84'	Stadium: Nikos Goumas Stadium; Attendance: 6,513; Referee: Spyros Papadakos (Laconia)

15 December 1997 14	Athinaikos	0–1	AEK Athens	Vyronas
15:00 EET (UTC+2)	Pliotas (yellow card); Psarris (yellow card); Sidiropoulos (yellow card); Papapostolou (yellow card)		Macheridis (yellow card); Nikolaidis 43' (pen.), (yellow card)	Stadium: Vyronas National Stadium; Attendance: 1,254; Referee: Thanasis Velliodis (Athens)

22 December 1997 15	Kalamata	1–2	AEK Athens	Kalamata
15:00 EET (UTC+2)	Dodoo (yellow card); Kostoulas (yellow card); Albertis 15'		Macheridis (yellow card); Grétarsson (yellow card); Kasapis (yellow card); Marcelo (yellow card); Bastios 17' (o.g.); Nikolaidis 29', (penalty missed) 71', (yellow card)	Stadium: Kalamata Municipal Stadium; Attendance: 3,957; Referee: Nikos Angelakis (Thessaloniki)

4 January 1998 16	AEK Athens	3–0	OFI	Nea Filadelfeia
17:00 EET (UTC+2)	Kostenoglou (yellow card); Kasapis (yellow card); Batista (yellow card) 26', (goal) 58'; Nikolaidis 35', 45'		Dedes (yellow card); Kiassos (yellow card); Anastasiou (penalty missed) 27'	Stadium: Nikos Goumas Stadium; Attendance: 21,667; Referee: Giorgos Douros (Corinthia)

12 January 1998 17	Skoda Xanthi	0–0	AEK Athens	Xanthi
16:30 EET (UTC+2)	Kechagias (yellow card) 57'		Grétarsson (yellow card); Macheridis (yellow card) 67'; Marcelo (yellow card) 85'	Stadium: A.O. Xanthi Stadium; Attendance: 6,093; Referee: Giorgos Bikas (Chalkidiki)

18 January 1998 18	AEK Athens	3–0	PAOK	Nea Filadelfeia
17:00 EET (UTC+2)	Kalitzakis (yellow card); Maladenis 17', 90+1'; Batista 58'		Zafiriou (yellow card); Kapetanopoulos (yellow card) 58' (yellow-red card) 79'; Zagorakis (red card) 88'	Stadium: Nikos Goumas Stadium; Attendance: 22,129; Referee: Stratos Papoutselis (Lesbos)

25 January 1998 19	Proodeftiki	3–2	AEK Athens	Nikaia
15:00 EET (UTC+2)	Zajmi 10', 22'; Călugărița (yellow card) 17'; Angelopoulos (yellow card) 26'; Almanidis 44'; Giannopoulos (yellow card) 21' (yellow-red card) 83'		Maladenis 18'; Kostenoglou (yellow card) 21' (yellow-red card) 83', (goal) 80'; Batista (yellow card) 28'; Donis (yellow card) 74'	Stadium: Nikaia Municipal Stadium; Attendance: 2,500; Referee: Giorgos Borovilos (Arcadia)

2 February 1998 20	AEK Athens	1–0	Olympiacos	Nea Filadelfeia
18:00 EET (UTC+2)	Manolas (yellow card) 2'; Kalitzakis (yellow card) 24' (yellow-red card) 90+1'; Nikolaidis (yellow card) 40'; Marcelo 66'; Maladenis (yellow card) 74'; Grétarsson (yellow card) 78'		Mavrogenidis (yellow card) 11'; Karapialis (yellow card) 28'; Karataidis (yellow card) 31'; Passalis (yellow card) 37'	Stadium: Nikos Goumas Stadium; Attendance: 22,378; Referee: Spyros Papadakos (Laconia)

8 February 1998 21	Kavala	1–1	AEK Athens	Kavala
17:00 EET (UTC+2)	Chatzizisis (yellow card); Tsapanidis (yellow card); Koltsis (yellow card); Enuagwuna (yellow card); Papandreou 62' (pen.)		Kostenoglou (yellow card); Sebwe (yellow card); Donis (yellow card); Manolas (yellow card); Atmatsidis (yellow card); Kasapis (yellow card); Doboș 50'; Maladenis (penalty missed) 72'	Stadium: Kavala Municipal Stadium; Attendance: 4,616; Referee: Michalis Kalathenos (Dodecanese)

15 February 1998 22	AEK Athens	2–2	Iraklis	Nea Filadelfeia
15:00 EET (UTC+2)	Maladenis 5'; Doboș 77'; Macheridis (yellow card) 88'		Jovanović (yellow card); Christodoulou (yellow card); Xenidis 83'; Kashimba 84'; G. Kostis (yellow card) 88'	Stadium: Nikos Goumas Stadium; Attendance: 14,846; Referee: Dionysis Stefanopoulos (Piraeus)

23 February 1998 23	Ionikos	1–1	AEK Athens	Nikaia
15:00 EET (UTC+2)	Pachatouridis (yellow card); Kljajević (yellow card); Xanthopoulos (yellow card); Gyrichidis (yellow card) 35'; Frousos 45+1'		Kalitzakis (yellow card); Savevski (yellow card); Vaios Karagiannis (yellow card); Tomić (yellow card); Macheridis (yellow card); Marcelo (yellow card) 34'; Doboș 35' (pen.); Nikolaidis (yellow card) 52'	Stadium: Neapoli Stadium; Attendance: 2,433; Referee: Giorgos Douros (Corinthia)

1 March 1998 24	Panathinaikos	0–1	AEK Athens	Marousi
18:00 EET (UTC+2)	Lagonikakis (yellow card) 81'		Maladenis 14'; Manolas (yellow card) 40'	Stadium: Olympic Stadium; Attendance: 30,093; Referee: Nikos Angelakis (Thessaloniki)

9 March 1998 25	AEK Athens	1–2	Paniliakos	Nea Filadelfeia
19:00 EET (UTC+2)	Tomić 84'		Georgiou (yellow card); Sapanis (yellow card) (yellow-red card) 26'; Rosales 48'; Lakis 54'	Stadium: Nikos Goumas Stadium; Attendance: 4,375; Referee: Stratos Papoutselis (Lesbos)

14 March 1998 26	Panionios	0–1	AEK Athens	Nea Smyrni
19:00 EET (UTC+2)	Karras (yellow card); Fyssas (yellow card)		Marcelo (yellow card); Kopitsis (yellow card); Maladenis 10', (yellow card)	Stadium: Nea Smyrni Stadium; Attendance: 2,491; Referee: Kyros Vassaras (Thessaloniki)

23 March 1998 27	AEK Athens	1–0	Apollon Athens	Nea Filadelfeia
19:00 EET (UTC+2)	Donis (yellow card) 39'; Nikolaidis 48'		Tatsis (yellow card)	Stadium: Nikos Goumas Stadium; Attendance: 2,271; Referee: Andreas Aronis (Piraeus)

29 March 1998 28	Panachaiki	0–0	AEK Athens	Patras
17:00 EEST (UTC+3)	Maladenis (yellow card); Doboș (yellow card); Nikolaidis (yellow card); Kasapis (yellow card)		Roussos (yellow card); Kalla (yellow card)	Stadium: Kostas Davourlis Stadium; Attendance: 4,553; Referee: Kyros Vassaras (Thessaloniki)

5 April 1998 29	AEK Athens	1–2	Veria	Nea Filadelfeia
17:00 EEST (UTC+3)	Kopitsis (penalty missed) 15'; Nikolaidis 45', (yellow card) 78'; Kostenoglou (yellow card) 83'		Thomaidis (yellow card); Mallous (yellow card); Dellios (yellow card); Petković (yellow card); Poursaitidis 5'; Stoica 84'	Stadium: Nikos Goumas Stadium; Attendance: 5,188; Referee: Pavlos Konstantinidis (Piraeus)

12 April 1998 30	Ethnikos Piraeus	1–3	AEK Athens	Piraeus
20:30 EEST (UTC+3)	Athanasiadis (yellow card); Petkovski (yellow card); Palacios 39'		Kasapis (yellow card); Savevski 22'; Marcelo 24'; Donis 81'	Stadium: Karaiskakis Stadium; Attendance: 2,478; Referee: Nikos Angelakis (Thessaloniki)

3 May 1998 31	AEK Athens	1–1	Athinaikos	Nea Filadelfeia
17:00 EEST (UTC+3)	Vaios Karagiannis (yellow card); Kopitsis (yellow card); Grétarsson 70'		Theodoropoulos (yellow card); Koltzos (yellow card); Routzieris (yellow card); Agathokleous 81'	Stadium: Nikos Goumas Stadium; Attendance: 3,149; Referee: Giorgos Borovilos (Arcadia)

10 May 1998 32	AEK Athens	4–2	Kalamata	Nea Filadelfeia
17:00 EEST (UTC+3)	Kostenoglou (yellow card); Donis (yellow card); Nikolaidis 11', 21'; Kopitsis (penalty missed) 14'; Maladenis 59'; Tomić 77'		Belevonis (yellow card); Aurélio (yellow card) 1'; Tzanetis (yellow card) 13'; Drougas 22'; Dodoo 83'	Stadium: Nikos Goumas Stadium; Attendance: 6,682; Referee: Giorgos Borovilos (Arcadia)

13 May 1998 33	OFI	1–1	AEK Athens	Heraklion
19:00 EEST (UTC+3)	Skentzos (yellow card); Anastasiou 77'		Nikolaidis 26'	Stadium: Theodoros Vardinogiannis Stadium; Attendance: 3,660; Referee: Christos Mittas (Thessaloniki)

17 May 1998 34	AEK Athens	2–0	Skoda Xanthi	Nea Filadelfeia
17:00 EEST (UTC+3)	Passios (yellow card); Donis 16'; Kopitsis 43'		Tsakonakis (yellow card); Karageorgiou (yellow card)	Stadium: Nikos Goumas Stadium; Attendance: 6,724; Referee: Dimitris Kalyvas (Boeotia)
Note: Stelios Manolas was honoured before the match in recognition of his retirement from football.

=== Greek Cup ===
AEK Athens entered the Greek Cup at the Round of 32.

==== Round of 32 ====
19 November 1997 First leg	Skoda Xanthi	2–1	AEK Athens	Xanthi
15:00 EET (UTC+2)	Venetidis (yellow card); Kechagias (yellow card); Mangan (yellow card); Tengelidis (yellow card); Zikos 41'; Chavos 55'	Report	Vlachos (yellow card); Kasapis 18'	Stadium: A.O. Xanthi Stadium; Attendance: 3,132; Referee: Pavlos Konstantinidis (Piraeus)

3 December 1997 Second leg	AEK Athens	0–2 (1–4 agg.)	Skoda Xanthi	Nea Filadelfeia
19:00 EET (UTC+2)	Batista (yellow card); Vaios Karagiannis (yellow card); Kostenoglou (yellow card)	Report	Antzas (yellow card); Sebwe 55'; Adamczyk 62'	Stadium: Nikos Goumas Stadium; Attendance: 4,198; Referee: Platonas Bozatzidis (Thessaloniki)

=== UEFA Cup Winners' Cup ===
==== First round ====
18 September 1997 First leg	AEK Athens (Greece)	5–0	(Latvia) Dinaburg	Athens, Greece
18:30 EEST (UTC+3)	Doboș (yellow card) 25'; Kopitsis 36' (pen.), 45'; Katsavos 64'; Kalitzakis 67'; Marcelo 77'	Report	Fedotovs (yellow card) 27'; Dusmanov (red card) 35'	Stadium: Nikos Goumas Stadium; Attendance: 10,587; Referee: Hans-Jürgen Weber (Germany)

2 October 1997 Second leg	Dinaburg (Latvia)	2–4 (2–9 agg.)	(Greece) AEK Athens	Riga, Latvia
21:00 EEST (UTC+3)	Fedotovs 34', (yellow card) 86'; Pinyaskin (yellow card) 48'; Isayev 62'	Report	Nikolaidis 35', 80'; Vlachos 50'; Kostis 72'; Kostenoglou (yellow card) 82'	Stadium: Daugava Stadium; Attendance: 1,500; Referee: Tom Henning Øvrebø (Norway)

==== Second round ====
23 October 1997 First leg	AEK Athens (Greece)	2–0	(Austria) Sturm Graz	Athens, Greece
20:00 EEST (UTC+3)	Kopitsis (yellow card) 11'; Kalitzakis (yellow card) 14'; Batista 75'; Marcelo 84'	Report	Mählich (yellow card) 20'; Foda (yellow card) 30'; Popović (yellow card) 64'; Reinmayr (yellow card) 70'	Stadium: Nikos Goumas Stadium; Attendance: 13,329; Referee: Alfredo Trentalange (Italy)

6 November 1997 Second leg	Sturm Graz (Austria)	1–0 (1–2 agg.)	(Greece) AEK Athens	Graz, Austria
21:00 EET (UTC+2)	Mählich (yellow card) 20'; Posch (yellow card) 30'; Haas (yellow card) 20'; Reinmayr (yellow card) 77'; Spiteri 82', (yellow card) 84'	Report	Kalitzakis (yellow card) 7'; Nikolaidis (yellow card) 38'; Kostenoglou (yellow card) 57'	Stadium: Arnold Schwarzenegger Stadium; Attendance: 15,400; Referee: Atanas Uzunov (Bulgaria)

==== Quarter-finals ====
5 March 1998 First leg	AEK Athens (Greece)	0–0	(Russia) Lokomotiv Moscow	Athens, Greece
20:00 EET (UTC+2)	Kasapis (yellow card) 48'; Vaios Karagiannis (yellow card) 51' (yellow-red card) 89'; Doboș (red card) 75'	Report	Loskov (yellow card) 39'; Arifullin (yellow card) 52'; Drozdov (yellow card) 62'; Kosolapov (yellow card) 82'; Smirnov (yellow card) 86'	Stadium: Nikos Goumas Stadium; Attendance: 24,367; Referee: Dick Jol (Netherlands)

19 March 1998 Second leg	Lokomotiv Moscow (Russia)	2–1 (2–1 agg.)	(Greece) AEK Athens	Moscow, Russia
18:00 EET (UTC+2)	Kharlachyov 53'; Chugainov 90'	Report	Manolas (yellow card) 17'; Kopitsis 67' (pen.)	Stadium: Lokomotiv Stadium; Attendance: 11,256; Referee: Markus Merk (Germany)

== Statistics ==
=== Squad statistics ===
As of 17 May 1998

No.	Pos	Player	Alpha Ethniki		Greek Cup		Cup Winners' Cup		Total	
No.	Pos	Player	Apps	Goals	Apps	Goals	Apps	Goals	Apps	Goals
Goalkeepers
1	GK	(Greece) Ilias Atmatsidis	33	0	2	0	6	0	41	0
15	GK	(Greece) Chrysostomos Michailidis	0	0	0	0	0	0	0	0
22	GK	(Greece) Vasilis Karagiannis	1	0	0	0	0	0	1	0
26	GK	(Greece) Dionysis Chiotis	1	0	0	0	0	0	1	0
Defenders
3	DF	(Greece) Michalis Kasapis	30	0	1	1	6	0	37	1
4	DF	(Romania) Anton Doboș	19	3	0	0	5	0	24	3
5	DF	(Greece) Nikos Kostenoglou	28	1	2	0	5	0	35	1
9	DF	(Greece) Georgios Koutoulas	2	0	1	0	0	0	3	0
12	DF	(Greece) Charis Kopitsis	24	3	1	0	6	3	31	6
13	DF	(Greece) Vaios Karagiannis	17	0	1	0	1	0	19	0
23	DF	(Greece) Vangelis Kefalas	0	0	0	0	1	0	1	0
25	DF	(Greece) Giannis Kalitzakis	28	0	2	0	5	1	35	1
29	DF	(Greece) Stelios Manolas	13	0	0	0	2	0	15	0
Midfielders
2	MF	(Greece) Triantafyllos Macheridis	27	0	1	0	4	0	32	0
7	MF	(Greece) Christos Maladenis	27	9	1	0	5	0	33	9
8	MF	(North Macedonia) Toni Savevski	32	5	2	0	6	0	40	5
18	MF	(Greece) Evripidis Katsavos	18	0	1	0	3	1	22	1
19	MF	(Greece) Mattheos Platakis	0	0	2	0	0	0	2	0
24	MF	(Iceland) Arnar Grétarsson	27	1	2	0	6	0	35	1
27	MF	(Greece) Giorgos Passios	1	0	0	0	0	0	1	0
30	MF	(Liberia) Kelvin Sebwe	19	0	2	0	0	0	21	0
Forwards
10	FW	(Greece) Christos Kostis	6	4	0	0	3	1	9	5
11	FW	(Greece) Demis Nikolaidis	26	19	1	0	5	2	32	21
20	FW	(Greece) Daniel Batista	16	7	2	0	3	1	21	8
21	FW	(Brazil) Marcelo Veridiano	29	3	2	0	5	2	36	5
28	FW	(Greece) Georgios Donis	17	2	0	0	0	0	17	2
31	FW	(Croatia) Goran Tomić	12	2	0	0	0	0	12	2
Left during Winter Transfer Window
6	DF	(Greece) Michalis Vlachos	11	0	1	0	3	1	15	1
16	DF	(Greece) Konstantinos Pavlopoulos	1	0	1	0	0	0	2	0
14	MF	(Greece) Theodoros Alexis	4	0	1	0	0	0	5	0

=== Goalscorers ===
As of 17 May 1998
The list is sorted by competition order when total goals are equal, then by position and then by squad number.

Rank	No.	Pos.	Player	Alpha Ethniki	Greek Cup	Cup Winners' Cup	Total
1	11	FW	(Greece) Demis Nikolaidis	19	0	2	21
2	7	MF	(Greece) Christos Maladenis	9	0	0	9
3	20	FW	(Greece) Daniel Batista	7	0	1	8
4	12	DF	(Greece) Charis Kopitsis	3	0	3	6
5	8	MF	(North Macedonia) Toni Savevski	5	0	0	5
5	10	FW	(Greece) Christos Kostis	4	0	1	5
5	21	FW	(Brazil) Marcelo Veridiano	3	0	2	5
8	4	DF	(Romania) Anton Doboș	3	0	0	3
9	28	FW	(Greece) Georgios Donis	2	0	0	2
9	31	FW	(Croatia) Goran Tomić	2	0	0	2
11	5	DF	(Greece) Nikos Kostenoglou	1	0	0	1
11	24	MF	(Iceland) Arnar Grétarsson	1	0	0	1
11	3	DF	(Greece) Michalis Kasapis	0	1	0	1
11	6	DF	(Greece) Michalis Vlachos	0	0	1	1
11	25	DF	(Greece) Giannis Kalitzakis	0	0	1	1
11	18	MF	(Greece) Evripidis Katsavos	0	0	1	1
Own goals				2	0	0	2
Totals				61	1	12	74

=== Hat-tricks ===
Numbers in superscript represent the goals that the player scored.

Player	Against	Result	Date	Competition	Source
(Greece) Demis Nikolaidis	(Greece) Apollon Athens	4–3 (A)	15 November 1997	Alpha Ethniki	

=== Assists ===
As of 17 May 1998
The list is sorted by competition order when total assists are equal, then by position and then by squad number.

Rank	No.	Pos.	Player	Alpha Ethniki	Greek Cup	Cup Winners' Cup	Total
1	21	FW	(Brazil) Marcelo Veridiano	9	0	2	11
2	3	DF	(Greece) Michalis Kasapis	8	0	1	9
3	8	MF	(North Macedonia) Toni Savevski	4	0	4	8
4	28	FW	(Greece) Georgios Donis	4	0	0	4
4	20	FW	(Greece) Daniel Batista	4	0	0	4
6	24	MF	(Iceland) Arnar Grétarsson	2	0	0	2
6	7	MF	(Greece) Christos Maladenis	2	0	0	2
6	30	MF	(Liberia) Kelvin Sebwe	2	0	0	2
6	12	DF	(Greece) Charis Kopitsis	1	0	1	2
10	9	DF	(Greece) Georgios Koutoulas	1	0	0	1
10	25	DF	(Greece) Giannis Kalitzakis	1	0	0	1
10	2	ΜF	(Greece) Triantafyllos Macheridis	1	0	0	1
10	18	MF	(Greece) Evripidis Katsavos	1	0	0	1
10	11	FW	(Greece) Demis Nikolaidis	1	0	0	1
10	31	FW	(Croatia) Goran Tomić	1	0	0	1
10	10	FW	(Greece) Christos Kostis	0	0	1	1
Totals				42	0	9	51

=== Clean sheets ===
As of 17 May 1998
The list is sorted by competition order when total clean sheets are equal and then by squad number. Clean sheets in games where both goalkeepers participated are awarded to the goalkeeper who started the game. Goalkeepers with no appearances are not included.

Rank	No.	Player	Alpha Ethniki	Greek Cup	Cup Winners' Cup	Total
1	1	(Greece) Ilias Atmatsidis	13	0	3	16
2	26	(Greece) Dionysis Chiotis	1	0	0	1
3	22	(Greece) Vasilis Karagiannis	0	0	0	0
Totals			14	0	3	17

=== Disciplinary record ===
As of 17 May 1998

N	P	Nat.	Name	Alpha Ethniki			Greek Cup			Cup Winners' Cup			Total			Notes
N	P	Nat.	Name	Yellow card	Second yellow card	Red card	Yellow card	Second yellow card	Red card	Yellow card	Second yellow card	Red card	Yellow card	Second yellow card	Red card	Notes
Goalkeepers
1	GK	(Greece)	Ilias Atmatsidis	2									2			
15	GK	(Greece)	Chrysostomos Michailidis													
22	GK	(Greece)	Vasilis Karagiannis													
26	GK	(Greece)	Dionysis Chiotis													
Defenders
3	DF	(Greece)	Michalis Kasapis	8						1			9			
4	DF	(Romania)	Anton Doboș	3						1			4			
5	DF	(Greece)	Nikos Kostenoglou	7	1		1			2			10	1		
9	DF	(Greece)	Georgios Koutoulas													
12	DF	(Greece)	Charis Kopitsis	3						1			4			
13	DF	(Greece)	Vaios Karagiannis	2			1			1	1		4	1		
23	DF	(Greece)	Vangelis Kefalas													
25	DF	(Greece)	Giannis Kalitzakis	5	1					2			7	1		
29	DF	(Greece)	Stelios Manolas	3						1			4			
Midfielders
2	MF	(Greece)	Triantafyllos Macheridis	8									8			
7	MF	(Greece)	Christos Maladenis	6									6			
8	MF	(North Macedonia)	Toni Savevski	2									2			
18	MF	(Greece)	Evripidis Katsavos	4									4			
19	MF	(Greece)	Mattheos Platakis													
24	MF	(Iceland)	Arnar Grétarsson	3									3			
27	MF	(Greece)	Giorgos Passios	1									1			
30	MF	(Liberia)	Kelvin Sebwe	1									1			
Forwards
10	FW	(Greece)	Christos Kostis													
11	FW	(Greece)	Demis Nikolaidis	9						1			10			
20	FW	(Greece)	Daniel Batista	3			1						4			
21	FW	(Brazil)	Marcelo Veridiano	5									5			
28	FW	(Greece)	Georgios Donis	4									4			
31	FW	(Croatia)	Goran Tomić	1									1			
Left during Winter Transfer window
6	DF	(Greece)	Michalis Vlachos	2			1						3			
16	DF	(Greece)	Kostas Pavlopoulos													
14	MF	(Greece)	Theodoros Alexis													

=== Starting 11 ===
This section presents the most frequently used formation along with the players with the most starts across all competitions.

N.	Formation	Matchday(s)
42	4–4–2	1–34

No.	Nat.	Player	Pos.
1	(Greece)	Ilias Atmatsidis	GK
6	(Greece)	Nikos Kostenoglou (C)	RCB
25	(Greece)	Giannis Kalitzakis	LCB
12	(Greece)	Charis Kopitsis	RB
17	(Greece)	Michalis Kasapis	LB
2	(Greece)	Triantafyllos Macheridis	DM
24	(Iceland)	Arnar Grétarsson	CM
28	(Greece)	Georgios Donis	RM
8	(North Macedonia)	Toni Savevski	LM
21	(Brazil)	Marcelo Veridiano	RCF
11	(Greece)	Demis Nikolaidis	LCF

Last updated: 1998-05-17

== Awards ==
Player	Pos.	Award	Source
(Greece) Demis Nikolaidis	FW	Greek Player of the Season	
(Greece) Ilias Atmatsidis	GK	Goalkeeper of the Season	
