= 1997–98 Kavala F.C. season =

Kavala
1997–98 season
- Manager: Nikos Goulis
- Stadium: Anthi Karagianni Stadium
- Alpha Ethniki: 13th
- Greek Cup: Third round
Home colours	Away colours

The 1997–1998 season was Kavala' 2nd straight season on the Greek first tier and their 3rd first-tier season in the 1990s. The team managed a league placement below middle, and reached the third round of the cup.

== Players ==
=== Squad ===
No.	Pos	Nat	Player	Total		Alpha Ethniki	
No.	Pos	Nat	Player	Apps	Goals	Apps	Goals
1	GK	(Greece) GRE	Panagiotis Logaras	31	0	31	0
2	MF	(Greece) GRE	Charalampos Telliadis	13	0	13	0
3	DF	(Bulgaria) BUL	Ivan Mitev	31	2	31	2
3	DF	(Cyprus) CYP	Nikos Katsavakis	2	0	2	0
4	DF	(Greece) GRE	Timos Kavakas	6	0	6	0
4	DF	(Greece) GRE	Konstantinos Vakirtzis	30	0	30	0
5	DF	(Greece) GRE	Kyrillos Kallimanis	29	2	29	2
6	MF	(Greece) GRE	Georgios Peglis	27	0	27	0
7	MF	(Poland) POL	Leszek Pisz	25	3	25	3
8	MF	(Greece) GRE	Georgios Mallios	30	3	30	3
9	FW	(Greece) GRE	Giorgos Papandreou	26	7	26	7
10	FW	(Greece) GRE	Anestis Athanasiadis	31	7	31	7
11	MF	(Greece) GRE	Anastasios Tsapanidis	21	0	21	0
11	MF	(Greece) GRE	Angelos Digozis	8	0	8	0
11	MF	(Greece) GRE	Ilias Michelidis	2	0	2	0
17	FW	(Greece) GRE	Giorgos Nasiopoulos	14	9	14	9
18	MF	(Greece) GRE	Sakis Paparadis	5	0	5	0
18	DF	(Greece) GRE	Giorgos Koltsis	24	0	24	0
20	DF	(Greece) GRE	Giorgos Karaisaridis	8	0	8	0
21	GK	(Greece) GRE	Fotis Kipouros	3	0	3	0
22	DF	(Greece) GRE	Christos Athanasiadis	18	0	18	0
24	MF	(Nigeria) NGA	Ifeanyi Udeze	22	0	22	0
27	DF	(Greece) GRE	Georgios Chatzizisis	15	0	15	0
29	MF	(Nigeria) NGA	James Enuagwuna	16	0	16	0
?	GK	(Greece) GRE	Georgios Bakirtzidis	0	0	0	0
?	GK	(Greece) GRE	Nikolaos Karabetakis	1	0	1	0
?	MF	(Greece) GRE	Vasilis Apostolou	1	0	1	0
?	MF	(Bulgaria) BUL	Dimitar Georgiev	1	0	1	0

=== Players who left during the season ===
No.	Pos	Nat	Player	Total		Alpha Ethniki	
No.	Pos	Nat	Player	Apps	Goals	Apps	Goals
12	MF	(Greece) GRE	Stavros Vakirtzis	4	0	4	0
13	MF	(Greece) GRE	Nikolaos Lyratzis	5	0	5	0
17	FW	(Poland) POL	Igor Sypniewski	18	7	18	7
?	MF	(Poland) POL	Adam Fedoruk	1	0	1	0
?	MF	(Nigeria) NGA	Himezi Sioma	1	0	1	0

== Managers ==
- Grzegorz Lato: start of season – 16 September 1997
- Kostas Iosifidis: 16 September 1997 – 5 January 1998
- Stelios Katrakylakis (caretaker): 5 January 1998 – 20 January 1998
- Nikos Goulis: 20 January 1998 – end of season

== Alpha Ethniki ==
=== League table ===
Pos	Team	Pld	W	D	L	GF	GA	GD	Pts	Qualification or relegation
11	Panionios	34	10	6	18	41	54	−13	36	Qualification for Cup Winners' Cup first round
12	Paniliakos	34	9	9	16	41	54	−13	36	
13	Kavala	34	10	5	19	40	58	−18	35	
14	Proodeftiki	34	9	7	18	35	57	−22	34	
15	Ethnikos Piraeus	34	10	3	21	27	51	−24	33	

Source: RSSSF
Rules for classification: 1st points; 2nd head-to-head points; 3rd head-to-head goal difference; 4th decision match.

=== Greek Cup ===
Kavala entered the Greek Cup at the Round of 32.

==== Round of 32 ====
19 November 1997 First leg	Apollon Kalamarias	3–0	Kavala	Thessaloniki
13:00 EET	Kallimanis 4'; Antić 6'; Samlidis 82'	Report (page 11)		Stadium: Kalamaria Stadium

3 December 1997 Second leg	Kavala	3–2 (3–5 agg.)	Apollon Kalamarias	Kavala
13:00 EET	Athanasiadis 27', 79'; Tsapanidis 53'	Report (page 14)	Tzoulis 47'; Lioftis 82'	Stadium: Anthi Karagianni Stadium
