= 1996–97 Greek Football Cup =

1996–97 Greek Cup
Tournament details
- Country: Greece
- Teams: 72

Final positions
- Champions: AEK Athens (11th title)
- Runners-up: Panathinaikos

Tournament statistics
- Matches played: 141
- Top goal scorer(s): Alexis Alexandris (7 goals)

The 1996–97 Greek Football Cup was the 55th edition of the Greek Football Cup.

== Tournament details ==
Totally 72 teams participated, 18 from Alpha Ethniki, 18 from Beta, and 36 from Gamma. It was held in 7 rounds, included final. After 8 years the group stage was suppressed, while the teams of Alpha Ethniki entered in the competition at the round of 32.

The round of 16 was very interesting, as Olympiacos eliminated PAOK and Panathinaikos eliminated Iraklis. Also, Ionikos tipped OFI with 7 goals. For third time in the 4 last years AEK Athens and Panathinaikos were pondered over in the final, held in Karaiskakis Stadium. AEK Athens won on penalty shoot-out.

The loss of Cup for Panathinaikos, in combination with their 5th place finish in the championship, resulted in club not qualifying in any European competition for the first time in the last 25 years.

== Calendar ==
Round	Date(s)	Fixtures	Clubs	New entries	Leagues entering
First Round	18, 25 August 1996	54	72 → 45	54	Beta Ethniki & Gamma Ethniki
Second Round	4, 5, 25 September & 9 October 1996	26	45 → 32	none	none
Round of 32	2, 3, 23 October & 13, 14 November 1996	32	32 → 16	18	Alpha Ethniki
Round of 16	27, 28 November & 11, 12 December 1996	16	16 → 8	none	none
Quarter-finals	8, 29 January 1997	8	8 → 4	none	none
Semi-finals	12, 26 February 1997	4	4 → 2	none	none
Final	16 April 1997	1	2 → 1	none	none

== Knockout phase ==
Each tie in the knockout phase, apart from the final, was played over two legs, with each team playing one leg at home. The team that scored more goals on aggregate over the two legs advanced to the next round. If the aggregate score was level, the away goals rule was applied, i.e. the team that scored more goals away from home over the two legs advanced. If away goals were also equal, then extra time was played. The away goals rule was again applied after extra time, i.e. if there were goals scored during extra time and the aggregate score was still level, the visiting team advanced by virtue of more away goals scored. If no goals were scored during extra time, the winners were decided by a penalty shoot-out. In the final, which were played as a single match, if the score was level at the end of normal time, extra time was played, followed by a penalty shoot-out if the score was still level.
The mechanism of the draws for each round is as follows:

- There are no seedings, and teams from the same group can be drawn against each other.

== First round ==
Team 1	Agg.	Team 2	1st leg	2nd leg
Atromitos	0–4	Anagennisi Karditsa	0–3	0–1
Varvasiakos	1–2	Agios Nikolaos	1–1	0–1
Tyrnavos	0–1	Doxa Drama	0–1	0–0
Proodeftiki	0–1	Panegialios	0–0	0–1
Ilisiakos	5–3	Anagennisi Kolindros	4–2	1–1
Trikala	1–1 (a)	Naoussa	1–1	0–0
Orestis Orestiada	2–5	Panionios	1–1	1–4
Niki Volos	1–3	Doxa Vyronas	1–1	0–2
AEL	6–2	Poseidon Michaniona	2–0	4–2
Ethnikos Asteras	2–1	Aetos Skydra	1–0	1–1
Egaleo	4–6	Iraklis Ptolemaida	1–1	3–5
Kallithea	1–0	Apollon Kalamarias	0–0	1–0
Lamia	3–4	Ergotelis	0–1	3–3
Korinthos	1–5	Nafpaktiakos Asteras	0–1	1–4
Panetolikos	5–1	Marko	1–0	4–1
Nigrita	1–6	AO Pyrgos	1–1	0–5
Almopos Aridea	0–2	ILTEX Lykoi	0–0	0–2
Ethnikos Piraeus	(a) 4–4	PAS Giannina	2–1	2–3
A.F.C. Patra	3–5	EAR	1–0	2–5
Anagennisi Arta	6–2	Irodotos	4–1	2–1
Panserraikos	3–1	Panargiakos	3–1	0–0
Aiolikos	1–1 (a)	Levadiakos	1–1	0–0
Apollon Larissa	0–3	Panelefsiniakos	0–0	0–3
Agrotikos Asteras	0–2	Ambelokipoi Thessaloniki	0–1	0–1
Kerkyra	3–3 (a)	Ialysos	3–1	0–2
Pierikos	2–1	Anagennisi Giannitsa	0–0	2–1
Olympiacos Volos	2–1	Diagoras – Rodos Enosis	2–0	0–1

== Second round ==
Team 1	Agg.	Team 2	1st leg	2nd leg
AEL	0–0 (3–5 p)	Kallithea	0–0	0–0 (a.e.t.)
Panelefsiniakos	1–0	Doxa Vyronas	1–0	0–0
Panionios	5–0	EAR	2–0	3–0
Panetolikos	0–1	Ethnikos Piraeus	0–0	0–1 (a.e.t.)
Ambelokipoi Thessaloniki	2–2 (a)	Panserraikos	2–1	0–1
Naoussa	4–1	Pierikos	2–0	2–1
Pyrgos	2–0	Agios Nikolaos	2–0	0–0
Ilisiakos	4–5	Ialysos	2–2	2–3
ILTEX Lykoi	4–0	Anagennisi Karditsa	3–0	1–0
Olympiacos Volos	3–2	Anagennisi Arta	2–0	1–2
Doxa Drama	2–6	Ethnikos Asteras	1–2	1–4
Iraklis Ptolemaida	1–5	Levadiakos	1–0	0–5
Ergotelis	2–4	Panegialios	1–0	1–4 (a.e.t.)
Nafpaktiakos Asteras	bye			

== Bracket ==
Round of 32
AEK Athens	5	3	8
Skoda Xanthi	0	3	3
Nafpaktiakos Asteras	1	2	3
ILTEX Lykoi	1	3	4
Kastoria	1	1	2
Ethnikos Asteras	0	4	4
Paniliakos	4	2	6
Panegialios	0	1	1
Veria	4	1	5
Kavala	0	1	1
Apollon Athens	3	1	4
Edessaikos	1	0	1
PAOK	4	3	7
Panionios	0	2	2
Olympiacos	4	3	7
Kalamata	1	1	2
AO Pyrgos	0	0	0
Iraklis	0	4	4
Panathinaikos	3	3	6
Athinaikos	0	0	0
Ialysos	1	2	3
Levadiakos	0	1	1
Ethnikos Piraeus (p)	0	1	1(2)
Kallithea	1	0	1(0)
Naoussa	1	1	2
Ionikos	2	3	5
Panserraikos	2	0	2
OFI	3	6	9
Aris	2	1	3
Panelefsiniakos	1	0	1
Olympiacos Volos	0	2	2
Panachaiki	2	2	4

Round of 16
AEK Athens	3	3	6
ILTEX Lykoi	1	0	1
Ethnikos Asteras	0	2	2
Paniliakos	5	3	8
Veria	1	0	1
Apollon Athens	0	2	2
PAOK	1	1	2
Olympiacos	2	2	4
Iraklis	0	0	0
Panathinaikos	1	3	4
Ialysos	4	2	6
Ethnikos Piraeus	1	2	3
Ionikos	7	0	7
OFI	2	2	4
Aris	1	0	1
Panachaiki	2	2	4

Quarter-finals
AEK Athens	3	2	5
Paniliakos	1	0	1
Apollon Athens	1	0	1
Olympiacos	1	1	2
Panathinaikos	2	1	3
Ialysos	0	1	1
Ionikos	3	0	3
Panachaiki (a)	1	2	3

Semi-finals
AEK Athens	2	1	3
Olympiacos	1	0	1
Panathinaikos	3	4	7
Panachaiki	0	0	0

Final
AEK Athens (p)	0(5)
Panathinaikos	0(3)

== Round of 32 ==
Team 1	Agg.	Team 2	1st leg	2nd leg
AO Pyrgos	0–4	Iraklis	0–0	0–4
Olympiacos	7–2	Kalamata	4–1	3–1
AEK Athens	8–3	Skoda Xanthi	5–0	3–3
Nafpaktiakos Asteras	3–4	ILTEX Lykoi	1–1	2–3
Apollon Athens	4–1	Edessaikos	3–1	1–0
Naoussa	2–5	Ionikos	1–2	1–3
Paniliakos	6–1	Panegialios	4–0	2–1
PAOK	7–2	Panionios	4–0	3–2
Kastoria	2–4	Ethnikos Asteras	1–0	1–4
Panathinaikos	6–0	Athinaikos	3–0	3–0
Panserraikos	2–9	OFI	2–3	0–6
Ialysos	3–1	Levadiakos	1–0	2–1
Veria	5–1	Kavala	4–0	1–1
Aris	3–1	Panelefsiniakos	2–1	1–0
Olympiacos Volos	2–4	Panachaiki	0–2	2–2
Ethnikos Piraeus	1–1 (2–0 p)	Kallithea	0–1	1–0 (a.e.t.)

== Round of 16 ==
=== Summary ===
Team 1	Agg.	Team 2	1st leg	2nd leg
Ionikos	7–4	OFI	7–2	0–2
Aris	1–4	Panachaiki	1–2	0–2
Veria	1–2	Apollon Athens	1–0	0–2
Iraklis	0–4	Panathinaikos	0–1	0–3
Ialysos	6–3	Ethnikos Piraeus	4–1	2–2
AEK Athens	6–1	ILTEX Lykoi	3–1	3–0
PAOK	2–4	Olympiacos	1–2	1–2
Ethnikos Asteras	2–8	Paniliakos	0–5	2–3

=== Matches ===
27 November 1996
14:45 EET

Ionikos	7–2	OFI
Kiassos 16' (o.g.); Tsiantakis 27'; Staboulis 39'; Ottiji 42', 53', 54'; Frousos 89'		Kiassos 22'; Moutas 82'

Neapoli Stadium, Piraeus
Referee: Thanasis Zachariadis (Thessaloniki)
11 December 1996
17:00 EET

OFI	2–0	Ionikos
Mitić 4'; Riznić 90'

Theodoros Vardinogiannis Stadium, Heraklion
Referee: Naoum Mintiouris (Serres)

Ionikos won 7–4 on aggregate.

28 November 1996
18:00 EET

Aris	1–2	Panachaiki
Mitsopoulos 17'		Vaitsis 19'; Androutsos 89'

Aris Stadium, Thessaloniki
Referee: Manolis Giannadakis (Lasithi)
11 December 1996
14:15 EET

Panachaiki	2–0	Aris
Palapanis 39'; Vaitsis 41'

Pampeloponnisiako Stadium, Patras
Attendance: 623
Referee: Michalis Kalathenos (Dodecanese)

Panachaiki won 4–1 on aggregate.

27 November 1996
14:45 EET

Veria	1–0	Apollon Athens
Tsalouchidis 74'

Veria Stadium, Veria
Referee: Nikos Angelakis (Thessaloniki)
11 December 1996
14:15 EET

Apollon Athens	2–0	Veria
Dikoumé 5'; Kefalas 77'

Rizoupoli Stadium, Rizoupoli
Referee: Argyris Papachintzios (Thessaloniki)

Apollon Athens won 2–1 on aggregate.

27 November 1996
19:00 EET

Iraklis	0–1	Panathinaikos
		Borrelli 66'

Kaftanzoglio Stadium, Thessaloniki
Attendance: 700
Referee: Dionysis Stefanopoulos (Piraeus)
11 December 1996
16:15 EET

Panathinaikos	3–0	Iraklis
Liberopoulos 15', 29', 87'

Olympic Stadium, Marousi
Attendance: 526
Referee: Giorgos Borovilos (Arcadia)

Panathinaikos won 4–0 on aggregate.

27 November 1996
13:00 EET

Ialysos	4–1	Ethnikos Piraeus
Kormaris 23'; Tahiri 31'; Kalimeris 65'; Raios 70'		Kontis 4'

Municipal Stadium Ekonomideio, Ialysos
Referee: Poungakiotis (Phthiotis)
12 December 1996
13:00 EET

Ethnikos Piraeus	2–2	Ialysos
Athanasiadis 44'; Petkovski 58'		Tahiri 88' (pen.); Kypriotis 89'

Karaiskakis Stadium, Piraeus
Referee: Doulis

Ialysos won 6–3 on aggregate.

27 November 1996
14:45 EET

AEK Athens	3–1	ILTEX Lykoi
Manolas 59'; Dimitriadis 70'; Nikolaidis 73'		Dotsis 15'

Nikos Goumas Stadium, Nea Filadelfeia
Attendance: 329
Referee: Dimitris Begos (Argolida)
11 December 1996
14:15 EET

ILTEX Lykoi	0–3	AEK Athens
		Kasapis 23'; Dimitriadis 52'; Kostis 72'

Lykoi Stadium, Thessaloniki
Referee: Giorgos Bikas (Chalkidiki)

AEK Athens won 6–1 on aggregate.

27 November 1996
19:30 EET

PAOK	1–2	Olympiacos
Zouboulis 19'		Alexandris 52'; Đorđević 73' (pen.)

Toumba Stadium, Thessaloniki
Attendance: 20,498
Referee: Georgios Psychomanis (Athens)
11 December 1996
18:15 EET

Olympiacos	2–1	PAOK
Alexandris 40', 59'		Tasiopoulos 41'

Karaiskakis Stadium, Piraeus
Attendance: 4,503
Referee: Sotiris Vorgias (Athens)

Olympiacos won 4–2 on aggregate.

27 November 1996
13:00 EET

Ethnikos Asteras	0–5	Paniliakos
		Tsekos 55', 89'; Barnjak 58'; Ilić 64'; Faltsetas 87' (o.g.)

Michalis Kritikopoulos Stadium, Kaisariani
Referee: Karaferias (Larissa)
11 December 1996
13:00 EET

Paniliakos	3–2	Ethnikos Asteras
Armylagos 43'; Pappas 72'; Gitsis 78'		Pavlopoulos 17', 63'

Pyrgos Stadium, Pyrgos
Referee: Malamas Tevekelis (Thessaloniki)

Paniliakos won 8–2 on aggregate.

== Quarter-finals ==
=== Summary ===
Team 1	Agg.	Team 2	1st leg	2nd leg
Ionikos	3–3 (a)	Panachaiki	3–1	0–2
Apollon Athens	1–2	Olympiacos	1–1	0–1
Panathinaikos	3–1	Ialysos	2–0	1–1
AEK Athens	5–1	Paniliakos	3–1	2–0

=== Matches ===
8 January 1997
14:45 EET

Ionikos	3–1	Panachaiki
Tsiantakis 7', 77'; Andrioli 33'	Report (page 5)	Roussos 23'

Neapoli Stadium, Piraeus
29 January 1997
14:30 EET

Panachaiki	2–0	Ionikos
Palapanis 21'; Klejch 63'	Report (page 5)

Pampeloponnisiako Stadium, Patras

Panachaiki won away goals.

8 January 1997
15:15 EET

Apollon Athens	1–1	Olympiacos
Alexis 19'	Report (page 5)	Alexandris 59'

Rizoupoli Stadium, Rizoupoli
Attendance: 1,056
Referee: Giorgos Bikas (Chalkidiki)
29 January 1997
18:15 EET

Olympiacos	1–0	Apollon Athens
Alexandris 28'	Report (page 5)

Karaiskakis Stadium, Piraeus
Attendance: 3,785
Referee: Michalis Kalathenos (Dodecanese)

Olympiacos won 2–1 on aggregate.

8 January 1997
13:00 EET

Panathinaikos	2–0	Ialysos
Alexoudis 18'; Warzycha 56'	Report (page 5)

Olympic Stadium, Marousi
Attendance: 267
29 January 1997
13:00 EET

Ialysos	1–1	Panathinaikos
Polja 17'	Report (page 5)	Warzycha 66'

Municipal Stadium Ekonomideio, Ialysos
Attendance: 2,553

Panathinaikos won 3–1 on aggregate.

8 January 1997
18:15 EET

AEK Athens	3–1	Paniliakos
Batista 23'; Vlachos 63'; Marcelo 66'	Report (page 5)	Kyzeridis 15'

Nikos Goumas Stadium, Nea Filadelfeia
Attendance: 1,311
Referee: Giorgos Borovilos (Arcadia)
29 January 1997
15:15 EET (UTC+2)

Paniliakos	0–2	AEK Athens
	Report	Ketsbaia 6', 26' (pen.)

Pyrgos Stadium, Pyrgos
Referee: Giorgos Douros (Corinthia)

AEK Athens won 5–1 on aggregate.

== Semi-finals ==
=== Summary ===
Team 1	Agg.	Team 2	1st leg	2nd leg
AEK Athens	3–1	Olympiacos	2–1	1–0
Panathinaikos	7–0	Panachaiki	3–0	4–0

=== Matches ===
12 February 1997
20:30 EET

AEK Athens	2–1	Olympiacos
Batista 46'; Kopitsis 73'	Report (page 6)	Alexandris 90+2'

Nikos Goumas Stadium, Nea Filadelfeia
Attendance: 24,450
Referee: Spyros Papadakos (Laconia)
26 February 1997
20:30 EET

Olympiacos	0–1	AEK Athens
	Report (page 7)	Nikolaidis 46'

Karaiskakis Stadium, Piraeus
Attendance: 25,955
Referee: Manolis Papatriantafyllou (Kilkis)

AEK Athens won 3–1 on aggregate.

12 February 1997
16:30 EET

Panathinaikos	3–0	Panachaiki
Alexopoulos 11'; Kalla 30' (o.g.); Warzycha 53'	Report (page 5)

Olympic Stadium, Marousi
Attendance: 4,374
Referee: Manolis Giannadakis (Lasithi)
26 February 1997
15:15 EET

Panachaiki	0–4	Panathinaikos
	Report (page 6)	Nasiopoulos 1'; Goumas 30'; Liberopoulos 69'; Syrigos 79' (o.g.)

Pampeloponnisiako Stadium, Patras
Attendance: 1,830
Referee: Thanasis Zachariadis (Thessaloniki)

Panathinaikos won 7–0 on aggregate.

== Final ==
16 April 1997
20:15 EEST

AEK Athens	0–0 (a.e.t.)	Panathinaikos
	Report
Penalties
Kopitsis (penalty scored); Borbokis (penalty scored); Nikolaidis (penalty scored); Doboş (penalty scored); Atmatsidis (penalty scored)	5–3	(penalty missed) Warzycha; (penalty scored) Konstantinidis; (penalty scored) Georgiadis; (penalty scored) Markos

Karaiskakis Stadium, Piraeus
Attendance: 21,926
Referee: Giorgos Psychomanis (Athens)
