= Tzanetis =

Tzanetis is a surname. Notable people with the surname include:

- Themis Tzanetis (born 1969), Greek footballer
- Tryfon Tzanetis (1918–1998), Greek footballer
