= Nikolaos Karabetakis =

Greek footballer (born 1971)

Personal information
- Date of birth: 17 May 1971 (age 55)
- Place of birth: Kavala, Greece
- Height: 1.85 m (6 ft 1 in)
- Position: Goalkeeper

Senior career*
Years	Team	Apps	(Gls)
1993–1998	Kavala		
1999–2001	Akratitos		
2001–2002	PAE Thraki		
2002–2004	Orfeas		
2005–2007	Doxa Gratini		
2007–2008	Nestos		
2008–2009	Pieris Melissokomio		

Managerial career
- 2015–2016: Iraklis (assistant)
- 2016: Doxa Drama
- 2017: Agrotikos Asteras
- 2017–2019: OFI (assistant)
- 2019: Ialysos
- 2019–2020: Triglia
- 2020–2023: Apollon Paralimnio
- * Club domestic league appearances and goals

Nikolaos Karabetakis (Greek: Νικόλαος Καραμπετάκης; born 17 May 1971) is a retired Greek football goalkeeper and later manager.
