= Triantafyllos Macheridis =

Greek footballer (born 1973)

Personal information
- Date of birth: 10 November 1973 (age 52)
- Place of birth: Dortmund, Germany
- Height: 1.88 m (6 ft 2 in)
- Positions: Defensive midfielder; defender

Youth career
- –1990: Pandramaikos

Senior career*
| Years | Team | Apps | (Gls) |
| 1990–1993 | Pandramaikos | 57 | (1) |
| 1993–1994 | Skoda Xanthi | 9 | (1) |
| 1994 | Pandramaikos | 9 | (1) |
| 1994–1996 | Skoda Xanthi | 39 | (1) |
| 1996–1999 | AEK Athens | 42 | (0) |
| 1998–1999 | → PAOK (loan) | 22 | (0) |
| 1999 | PAOK | 9 | (0) |
| 1999–2000 | Benfica | 14 | (0) |
| 2001 | → Kalamata (loan) | 7 | (0) |
| 2002 | Alki Larnaca | 4 | (0) |
| 2003 | Doxa Drama | | |
| 2005–2006 | Chania | 4 | (0) |
| Total | | 216 | (4) |
- * Club domestic league appearances and goals

Triantafyllos Macheridis (Greek: Τριαντάφυλλος Μαχαιρίδης; born 10 November 1973) is a Greek former professional footballer who played as a defensive midfielder.

== Career ==
Macheridis began his professional career in 1990 with boyhood club Pandramaikos. He later had two spells with both Pandramaikos and Skoda Xanthi. On 7 June 1996 Macheridis was transferred to AEK Athens for a fee of 100 million drachmas. In his first season at Athens he won the Greek Super Cup defeating Panathinaikos on penalties and was also an integral part of the team won the Cup. On 3 August 1998, after two successful seasons with AEK, Macheridis moved to PAOK as an exchange for Paris Zouboulis.

On 30 December 1999, Macheridis was signed by Benfica of Portugal who was at the time led by German coach Jupp Heynckes. Macheridis debuted for the Encarnados on 9 January 2000 in the Lisbon derby match against Sporting CP. Despite his stay with Benfica being short, Macheridis was used as a regular and the team eventually finished third in the domestic league campaign behind Porto and Sporting CP. He would finish the 1999–2000 season with sixteen appearances to his name.

In the transfer season of 2000, Macheridis failed to report to the preseason, with threats of having to compensate Benfica for unilaterally terminating his contract. After negotiations, he joined Kalamata on loan for the remainder of the season, leaving permanently in June 2001. Following Benfica, Triantafyllos would sign for Alki Larnaca of Cyprus where he would remain their for two seasons before finishing his career with boyhood club Doxa Drama in 2004.

== Honours ==
AEK Athens

- Greek Football Cup: 1996–97
- Greek Super Cup: 1996

Alki Larnaca

- Cypriot Second Division: 2000–01
