= Agapitos Abelas =

Greek footballer

Personal information
- Date of birth: 8 March 1975 (age 51)
- Place of birth: Rhodes, Greece
- Height: 1.81 m (5 ft 11 in)
- Position: Left-back

Senior career*
Years	Team	Apps	(Gls)
1991–1996	Diagoras		
1996–1999	Proodeftiki		
1999–2001	Kavala		
2001	Panionios		
2002	Panachaiki		
2003–2006	Aris		
2006–2009	Rodos		

Managerial career
- 2019: Ialysos (assistant)
- 2019–2020: Ialysos (caretaker)
- 2023–2024: Iraklis Maritsa
- * Club domestic league appearances and goals

Agapitos Abelas (Greek: Αγαπητός Αμπελάς; born 8 March 1975) is a Greek professional football manager and former player.
