= Giorgos Passios =

Greek footballer (born 1980)

Personal information
- Full name: Georgios Passios
- Date of birth: 4 May 1980 (age 46)
- Place of birth: Melbourne, Australia
- Height: 1.89 m (6 ft 2 in)
- Positions: Midfielder; centre-back

Youth career
- –1997: AEK Athens

Senior career*
| Years | Team | Apps | (Gls) |
| 1997–2003 | AEK Athens | 9 | (0) |
| 2004–2006 | AEL | 11 | (0) |
| 2006 | Kerkyra | 5 | (0) |
| Total | | 25 | (0) |

International career
| 1999 | Greece U18 | 3 | (0) |
- * Club domestic league appearances and goals

Giorgos Passios (Greek: Γιώργος Πάσσιος; born 4 May 1980) is a Greek former professional who played as a midfielder.

== Club career ==
Passios started playing football at the youth departments of AEK Athens. In the summer of 1997 he was promoted to the senior team at the age of 17. He was a tall, versatile player who could easily compete at both the midfield and the center of defense. Even though he was considered a promising footballer, a series of injuries held him back and he did not manage to establish himself in the squad. He made his debut on 17 May 1998 in a 2–0 win at home against Skoda Xanthi. During his spell with the yellow-blacks, he won 2 Cup in 2000 and in 2002. On 17 July 2003 he was released from AEK.

On 27 July 2004, he signed for AEL, where he played in the second division. There, he managed to win the championship and get the promotion to the first division. His few appearances resulted in his departure in December 2005 and his move to the second division side, Kerkyra. At the club of Corfu, he managed yet again to get the promotion at the end of the season. In December 2006, after his contact was over, he left the club.

== International career ==
Passios made 3 appearances for Greece U18 in the 1999 UEFA European Under-18 Championship.

== Honours ==
AEK Athens

- Greek Cup: 1999–2000, 2001–02

AEL

- Beta Ethniki: 2004–05
