= Vangelis Kefalas =

Greek footballer

Personal information
- Full name: Evangelos Kefalas
- Date of birth: 31 July 1973 (age 53)
- Position: Defender

Youth career
- –1992: GS Argyroupolis

Senior career*
Years	Team	Apps	(Gls)
1992–1997	Apollon Athens	115	(4)
1997–1999	AEK Athens	8	(0)
1999	→ Kavala (loan)	8	(1)
1999–2000	Kavala	13	(2)
2000	Kalamata	12	(1)
2000–2002	Panachaiki	37	(4)
2002–2003	Apollon Smyrnis	20	(2)
2003–2004	Panserraikos		
2004–2005	PAS Giannina		
2005	Trikala		
2005–2006	Asteras Tripolis		
2006–2008	Agios Dimitrios		
2008	A.O. Nea Ionia		

International career
1994	Greece U21	1	(0)
- * Club domestic league appearances and goals

Vangelis Kefalas (Greek: Βαγγέλης Κεφαλάς; born 31 July 1973) is a retired Greek footballer who played as a defender.

== Club career ==
Kefalas started his football career at AON Argyroupolis and in 1992 he moved to Apollon Athens. There he had a fairly good performance and showed his potential as a defender.

On 7 July 1997, Kefalas was transferred to AEK Athens alongside his teammate, Theodoros Alexis. At AEK he did not manage to seize the opportunities he was given and he was used mainly as a substitute. On 13 January 1999 he was loaned to Kavala until the end of the season.

After the end of his loan in the summer of 1999 his transfer became permanent. In 2000 he moved to Kalamata for a short spell and then for Panachaiki, where he spent two seasons. In 2002 he returned to Apollon Athens for a season and then he competed for Panserraikos, PAS Giannina, Trikala and Asteras Tripolis, until 2006, where he ended his career as a professional. He then continued in lower-division clubs, such as Agios Dimitrios and A.O. Nea Ionia, where he retired in 2008.
