= Aleksandrs Fedotovs =

Latvian footballer

Personal information
- Date of birth: 29 March 1971 (age 55)
- Height: 1.81 m (5 ft 11 in)
- Position: Midfielder

Senior career*
Years	Team	Apps	(Gls)
1990	Zvezda Moscow	3	(0)
1992–1993	BJSS / Auseklis Daugavpils	37	(7)
1994	DAG Rīga	18	(8)
1995–2000	Dinaburg FC	125	(32)
2000–2001	Metalurgs Liepāja	7	(1)
2005	FK Venta	3	(0)

International career
1994–1997	Latvia	3	(0)
- * Club domestic league appearances and goals

Aleksandrs Fedotovs (born 29 March 1971) is a retired Latvian football midfielder.
