= Miloje Kljajević =

Serbian football manager

Personal information
- Date of birth: 10 September 1968 (age 58)
- Place of birth: Bijelo Polje, FR Yugoslavia

Senior career*
Years	Team	Apps	(Gls)
1989-1990	Partizan		
1990-1991	Sutjeska Nikšić		
1994–1999	Ionikos	120	(11)
1999–2001	Panionios	49	(2)
2001–2002	AEK Larnaca	14	(0)
2002–2003	Ionikos	7	(0)

Managerial career
- 2003: Ionikos
- * Club domestic league appearances and goals

Miloje Kljajević (born 10 September 1968) is a retired Serbian football defender.
