= Panagiotis Logaras =

Greek footballer

Personal information
- Date of birth: 26 November 1972 (age 53)
- Place of birth: Stuttgart, West Germany
- Height: 1.93 m (6 ft 4 in)
- Position: Goalkeeper

Senior career*
Years	Team	Apps	(Gls)
–1991	Enosi Thraki		
1991–1996	Doxa Drama		
1996–2001	Kavala		
2001–2002	OFI		
- * Club domestic league appearances and goals

Panagiotis Logaras (Greek: Παναγιώτης Λογαράς; born 26 November 1972) is a retired Greek football goalkeeper. His son Pavlos, is also professional football player.
