= Vitali Pinyaskin =

Russian footballer

Personal information
- Full name: Vitali Mikhailovich Pinyaskin
- Date of birth: 24 August 1972 (age 54)
- Place of birth: Moscow, Russian SFSR
- Height: 1.75 m (5 ft 9 in)
- Position: Midfielder

Youth career
- FC Dynamo Moscow

Senior career*
Years	Team	Apps	(Gls)
1989	FC Dynamo Moscow	0	(0)
1990	FC Dynamo-2 Moscow	0	(0)
1991–1992	FC Lokomotiv Moscow	1	(0)
1992	→ FC Lokomotiv-d Moscow (loan)	29	(0)
1993–1995	futsal		
1995	FC Chernomorets Novorossiysk	6	(9)
1996–1998	Dinaburg FC	46	(0)
1998	PFC Spartak Nalchik	10	(0)
1999	Dinaburg FC	24	(0)
2000	FC Zhemchuzhina Sochi	19	(0)
2001	FC Khimki	8	(0)
2002	FC Almaz Moscow (amateur)		
2003	FC Mosgaz Moscow		
2004	Dinaburg FC	11	(0)
2004–2005	CS Tiligul-Tiras Tiraspol	12	(0)
2009	FC Krasnogvardeyets Moscow (amateur)		
- * Club domestic league appearances and goals

Vitali Mikhailovich Pinyaskin (Russian: Виталий Михайлович Пиняскин; born 24 August 1972 in Moscow) is a former Russian football player.

== Honours ==
Dinaburg

- Latvian Higher League bronze: 1996, 1997
- Latvian Football Cup runner-up: 1997
