= Christos Athanasiadis (footballer, born 1978) =

Greek footballer

Personal information
- Date of birth: 21 August 1978 (age 48)
- Place of birth: Drama, Greece
- Height: 1.78 m (5 ft 10 in)
- Position: Defender

Senior career*
Years	Team	Apps	(Gls)
1997–1999	Kavala		
1999–2000	Niki Volos		
2000–2001	Kavala		
2001–2004	Doxa Drama		
2004–2005	Olympiacos Volos		
2005–2007	Panthrakikos		
2007–2008	Ilioupoli		
2008–2009	Doxa Drama		
- * Club domestic league appearances and goals

Christos Athanasiadis (Greek: Χρήστος Αθανασιάδης; born 21 August 1978) is a Greek former professional footballer who played as a defender.
