= Jovica Damjanović =

Serbian footballer

Personal information
- Date of birth: 11 December 1975 (age 50)
- Place of birth: Venčani
- Position: Midfielder

Senior career*
Years	Team	Apps	(Gls)
1996–1998	Apollon Smyrnis	43	(12)
2003–2004	Kallithea		
- * Club domestic league appearances and goals

Jovica Damjanović (born 11 December 1975) is a Serbian retired football midfielder.
