= Georgios Staboulis =

Greek footballer (born 1975)

Personal information
- Date of birth: 28 February 1975 (age 51)
- Place of birth: Chania, Crete
- Height: 1.75 m (5 ft 9 in)
- Position: Attacking midfielder

Youth career
- 1990-1992: Salaminomachoi
- 1992-1993: Αίας Σαλαμίνας

Senior career*
Years	Team	Apps	(Gls)
1993-1994	Peramaikos		
1994–2001	Ionikos		
2001–2003	Apollon Smyrnis		
2004-2005	Βύζας Μεγάρων		
2005-2007	Apollon Smyrnis		
2007-2008	Acharnaikos		
2008-2009	A.O. Pefki		
2009-2010	A.O. Chalkida		
- * Club domestic league appearances and goals

Georgios Staboulis (Greek: Γεώργιος Σταμπουλής; born 28 February 1975) is a retired Greek football midfielder.

He holds currently a UEFA B' diploma being mainly involved with coaching in academies.

== Honors ==
- Runner-up in the Greek Cup with Ionikos in 2000 (AEK-Ionikos 2-0)
- Champion with A.O. Chalkidas
- 4th place in the Panhellenic Mixed Football Championship (1992)

== International appearances ==
- With Ionikos in 1999 (FC Nantes-Ionikos 1-0)
- World Military Championships (SISM) winning 1st place (1998).
