= Georgios Mallios =

Greek footballer

Personal information
- Date of birth: 25 May 1965 (age 61)
- Height: 1.71 m (5 ft 7 in)
- Position: Defender

Senior career*
| Years | Team | Apps | (Gls) |
| 1986–1988 | Doxa Drama | | |
| 1989–1993 | Iraklis | | |
| 1993–2001 | Kavala | | |
- * Club domestic league appearances and goals

Georgios Mallios (Greek: Γεώργιος Μάλλιος; born 25 May 1965) is a retired Greek football defender.
