= Cyrille Mangan =

Cameroonian footballer

Personal information
- Date of birth: 13 September 1976 (age 50)
- Place of birth: Douala, Cameroon
- Height: 1.78 m (5 ft 10 in)
- Position: Midfielder

Senior career*
Years	Team	Apps	(Gls)
1996–1999	Skoda Xanthi	22	(0)
2001–2002	Trikala		
2002–2003	Panegialios	28	(4)
2003–2008	Thyella Patras		
2008	Koropi		

International career
1996–1998	Cameroon	7	(1)
- * Club domestic league appearances and goals

Cyrille Mangan (born 13 September 1976) is a Cameroonian former professional footballer who played as a midfielder.

Mangan played for Skoda Xanthi in the Greek Alpha Ethniki from 1996 to 1999. He suffered a serious knee injury at the age of 22 years, but recovered and later played for Trikala F.C. in the Greek Gamma Ethniki and Panegialios F.C. in the Greek Beta Ethniki.

Mangan played for the Cameroon national football team in the 1998 African Cup of Nations finals. and in 1998 FIFA World Cup qualifying.
