= Georgios Peglis =

Greek footballer

Personal information
- Date of birth: 21 August 1978 (age 48)
- Height: 1.78 m (5 ft 10 in)
- Position: Defender

Senior career*
Years	Team	Apps	(Gls)
–1994	Iraklis		
1994–2000	Kavala		
2000–2001	Paphos		
2001–2004	Enosis Neon Paralimni		
2004–2006	Olympiakos Nicosia		
2006–2008	Aris Limassol		
- * Club domestic league appearances and goals

Georgios Peglis (Greek: Γεώργιος Πεγκλής; born 25 December 1973) is a retired Greek football defender.
