= Konstantinos Vakirtzis =

Greek footballer

Personal information
- Date of birth: 2 October 1971 (age 55)
- Position: Defender

Senior career*
Years	Team	Apps	(Gls)
1992–1999	Kavala		
1999	Aris	5	(0)
2000–2001	Kavala	33	(1)
2001–?	Panegialios		
- * Club domestic league appearances and goals

Konstantinos Vakirtzis (Greek: Κωνσταντίνος Βακιρτζής; born 2 October 1971) is a retired Greek football defender.
