= Marcelo Veridiano =

Brazilian footballer

Marcelo
Personal information
- Full name: Marcelo Veridiano
- Date of birth: June 30, 1966 (age 60)
- Place of birth: São Paulo, Brazil
- Height: 1.80 m (5 ft 11 in)
- Position: Striker

Senior career*
Years	Team	Apps	(Gls)
1986–1989	São Paulo	36	(6)
1989	Vitória		
1989–1996	Skoda Xanthi	207	(75)
1996–1998	AEK Athens	56	(9)
1998–2000	APOEL	43	(19)
2000–2001	Kozani	26	(3)
Total		368	(112)

Managerial career
- 2001–2002: Aris (assistant)
- 2002–2003: AEL Limassol (assistant)
- 2004–2006: Skoda Xanthi Youth
- 2007: Omonia (assistant)
- 2007–2008: Veria (assistant)
- * Club domestic league appearances and goals

Marcelo Veridiano (Brazilian Portuguese: [mɐʁˈsɛlu veɾidʒiˈɐnu]; born June 30, 1966) is a former Brazilian footballer.

== Club career ==
Marcelo started his professional career in 1986 at São Paulo. He played for São Paulo until 1989 when he was acquired by Skoda Xanthi.

He instantly became the club's main striker scoring 11 goals in 21 matches. His best season with the club was 1992–93 when he scored 24 goals in 32 matches being the league's third top scorer. He was the first player to score 4 goals in a match in the Greek professional championship in an 8–2 win against Pierikos on 10 January 1993 which was the team's biggest league win. He is also Skoda Xanti's all-time top goalscorer with 75 goals and the player who scored both the 100th (May 22, 1992 against Aris) and the 200th (February 13, 1994 against Panathinaikos) Skoda Xanthi's league goal.

On 2 July 1996 Marcelo was transferred to AEK Athens for a fee of 35 million drachmas. In his first season at the club he won the Greek Cup and the Greek Super Cup. In the summer of 1998, he moved to APOEL and helped his team to win the 1998–99 Cypriot Cup, scoring twice in the Cup final where APOEL won 2–0 Anorthosis Famagusta. He ended his career with Kozani in 2001.

== Honours ==
São Paulo

- Campeonato Paulista: 1987, 1989

AEK Athens

- Greek Cup: 1996–97
- Greek Super Cup: 1996

APOEL

- Cypriot Cup: 1998–99
