= Vyacheslav Dusmanov =

Russian footballer

Personal information
- Full name: Vyacheslav Yevgenyevich Dusmanov
- Date of birth: 8 June 1973 (age 53)
- Place of birth: Izhevsk, Russian SFSR
- Height: 1.86 m (6 ft 1 in)
- Position: Goalkeeper

Youth career
- Izhplaneta Izhevsk

Senior career*
Years	Team	Apps	(Gls)
1990–1993	Dynamo Moscow	0	(0)
1992–1993	→ Dynamo-d Moscow (loan)	49	(0)
1994	Lada Togliatti	10	(0)
1995	Gazovik-Gazprom Izhevsk	0	(0)
1996	MChS-Selyatino Selyatino	15	(0)
1997–1998	Dinaburg	13	(0)
2001–2002	Gomel	47	(0)
2003	Metallurg-Kuzbass Novokuznetsk	6	(0)
2004	Chkalovets-1936 Novosibirsk	11	(0)
2005	Neman Grodno	7	(0)
2006	Spartak Shchyolkovo	3	(0)
2009	Krasnogvardeyets Moscow		
- * Club domestic league appearances and goals

Vyacheslav Yevgenyevich Dusmanov (Russian: Вячеслав Евгеньевич Дусманов; born 8 June 1973) is a former Russian football player.

He played in the 2002–03 UEFA Cup for FC Gomel, allowing 8 goals in two games against FC Schalke 04.
