= Ivan Mitev =

Bulgarian physician

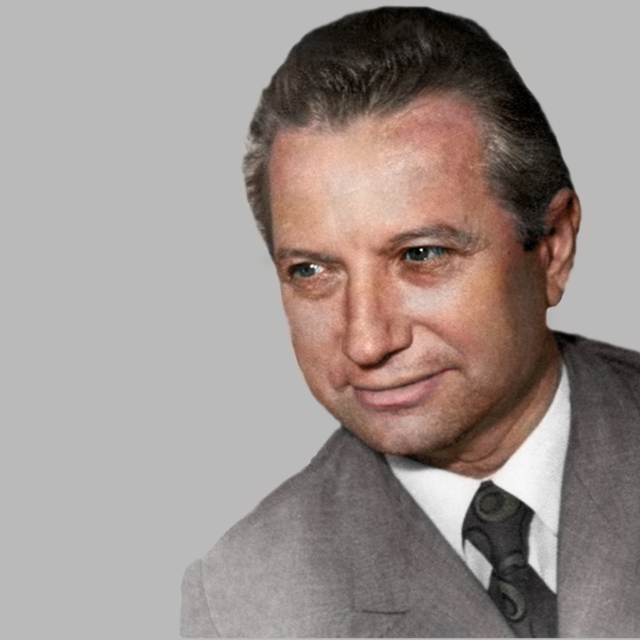
- Ivan Mitev
- Born: Ivan Ivanov Mitev; 4 October 1924; Krushovitsa, Bulgaria
- Died: 15 April 2006 (aged 81)
- Occupations: Pediatrician, Cardiologist

Prof. Dr. Ivan Mitev Ivanov (Bulgarian: Иван Митев Иванов) (4 October 1924 – 15 April 2006) was a Bulgarian pediatrician and cardio rheumatologist who discovered the sixth heart tone, called the tone of Mitev. The Bulgarian scientific achievement of the 20th century.

== Life and career ==
Ivan Mitev was born on October 4, 1924 in the village of Krushovitsa, Vratsa region. In 1950, he graduated from the Medical University of Sofia and then he started to work in the “Public Health” Department in Ruse (1950). In 1953, he was promoted to head of the department.

In 1960, he became a research associate at the Scientific Institute of Pediatrics. In 1972, he became a senior research associate, and after 6 years, he became the head of the children's clinic for cardiovascular and collagen diseases. From 1980, he was the director of the Clinic for Cardiovascular Diseases, and 5 years later, he was the director of the Institute and the chief specialist in pediatrics in Bulgaria until his retirement in 1989.

== The Discovery ==
The discovery made by Prof. Dr. Ivan Mitev was made in an area that was studied very intensively until about 30 years ago. In the past, when it was not possible to directly penetrate the heart, inject contrast material, and visualize the atria, chambers, and coronary arteries, diagnostics relied mostly on the information obtained from heart sounds.

Heart tones have always been one of the most researched areas in medicine. With a simple ear, a person can hear the first and second heart sounds, with the help of a stethoscope – the third heart sound, and in some cases, the fourth. The fifth heart sound cannot be heard with a stethoscope and is recorded only using phonocardiography. The sixth heart sound is the only one detected during systole. It is low-frequency and also cannot be picked up by any other means than a phonocardiograph, which records heart sounds. (The phonocardiograph has been widely used for decades, but is now being superseded by invasive cardiology.)

In early 1972, during phonocardiography of children with aortic valve insufficiency, he detected an additional sound. Unsure of his discovery, he continued examining other patients, trying to detect the presence of this additional sound.

"We were attracted by the registration of low-frequency telesystolic additional oscillations in the form of 1-2 teeth, detached from the I and II tone... To clarify the finding, we performed a polycardiographic examination of 26 people with isolated aortic valve insufficiency. In 12 of them, an additional low-frequency tone was recorded. Since such a tone is also recorded in healthy people, we considered it correct to call it the sixth heart sound."

Prof. Mitev deposited his discovery at the Institute for Inventions and Rationalizations on July 27, 1972. Then began a long procedure to confirm this tone. The procedure was lengthy because lawyers at the Institute said it is not an invention or rationalization, but a discovery. Since there has been no registered Bulgarian discovery so far, the registration procedure was very long and complicated, and there must be indisputable evidence for the discovery. Prof. Ivan Mitev contacted many famous cardiologists – American, French and from the former Soviet Union. He provided them with his materials and asked for their expert opinion. A large part of the world-famous cardiologists at the time were adamant that it is really a separate tone. It was only then, that Bulgarian experts at the Institute for Inventions and Rationalizations gave their approval in support of the sixth heart sound as meeting the criteria for discovery. The discovery award was presented by the head of state Todor Zhivkov at a solemn ceremony.

It is curious that, with this discovery, Prof. Mitev appeared for the defense of his doctorate at the Institute of Pediatrics, but in the end his defense failed, without the commission denying or approving of the existence of the sixth tone. Prof. Mitev passed through another academic institution, called VAK, and defended his doctoral thesis.

In 1974, Prof. Dr. Ivan Mitev published his discovery in issue 4 of the journal "Pediatrics". His discovery was recognized in 1980. In his honor, it was issued the only stamp of its kind in the world related to cardiology, called "VI tone".

If the studies continued and the hypothesis about the sixth heart sound were further developed, it could be used to diagnose and track the recovery period in various heart and cardiovascular diseases. Nowadays, the exact diagnosis of heart defects is made through invasive diagnostics.
