= Georgios Koltsis =

Greek footballer

Personal information
- Full name: Georgios Koltsis
- Date of birth: 22 October 1974 (age 52)
- Place of birth: Aridea, Greece
- Height: 1.75 m (5 ft 9 in)
- Position: Defender

Senior career*
Years	Team	Apps	(Gls)
1996–2000	Kavala	119	(1)
2001	Paniliakos	13	(0)
2002–2004	Patraikos	70	(2)
2004–2005	Panachaiki	35	(0)
2005–2008	Apollon Kalamarias	66	(0)
2008–2009	Veria	23	(0)
2009	Levadiakos	3	(0)
2010	Ilioupoli	18	(0)
2010–2013	Ilisiakos		

Managerial career
- 2014–2015: Lamia (assistant)
- 2016–2018: Lamia (assistant)
- 2019: Xanthi (assistant)
- 2019: Xanthi (caretaker)
- 2020–2021: Panachaiki (assistant)
- 2021–2022: Chania (assistant)
- * Club domestic league appearances and goals

Georgios Koltsis (Greek: Γεώργιος Κόλτσης; born 22 October 1974) is a Greek retired football defender and later manager.
