= Kyrillos Kallimanis =

Greek footballer

Personal information
- Date of birth: 29 April 1968 (age 58)
- Position: Defender

Senior career*
Years	Team	Apps	(Gls)
1996–1999	Kavala		
1999–2000	Panserraikos		
2000–2001?	Nafpaktiakos Asteras		
- Enosi Thraki

Managerial career
- 2022–2023: Kastoria
- 2024–2025: Kastoria
- * Club domestic league appearances and goals

Kyrillos Kallimanis (Greek: κύριλλος Καλλιμάνης; born 29 April 1968) is a retired Greek football defender and football manager who has managed Kastoria GPO in the Greek A Division.
