= Themis Tzanetis =

Greek footballer

Personal information
- Date of birth: 10 January 1969 (age 57)
- Position: Defender

Senior career*
Years	Team	Apps	(Gls)
1987–1997	Panionios		
1998–2000	Kalamata		
2000–2002	PAS Giannina		
2002–2003	Fostiras		
2004	Thrasyvoulos		
- * Club domestic league appearances and goals

Themis Tzanetis (Greek: Θέμης Τζανετής; born 10 January 1969) is a retired Greek football defender.
