= Theodoros Alexis =

Greek footballer

Personal information
- Date of birth: 6 May 1975 (age 51)
- Place of birth: Greece
- Position: Midfielder

Youth career
- –1992: Attalos

Senior career*
Years	Team	Apps	(Gls)
1992–1997	Apollon Athens	146	(19)
1997–1998	AEK Athens	4	(0)
1998	→ Athinaikos (loan)	10	(0)
1998–2000	Apollon Smyrnis	34	(4)
2000	Akratitos		
2001–2002	Panelefsiniakos		
2002–2003	Marko		

International career
- Greece U21
- * Club domestic league appearances and goals

Theodoros Alexis (Greek: Θεόδωρος Αλέξης; born 6 May 1975) is a Greek former professional footballer who played as a midfielder.

== Club career ==
Alexis started at Attalos and in 1992 he moved to Apollon Athens. He had a fairly good presence at the club, emerging as one of the youngest scorers of the Greek championship, as scored his first goal at the age of 17.

On 7 July 1997, Alexis was transferred to AEK Athens alongside his teammate, Vangelis Kefalas. At AEK he played only 4 times for the championship as a substitute, without managing to gain the trust of the manager Dumitru Dumitriu. Thus, on 15 January 1998 he was loaned to Athinaikos. After his loan was expired he was released from AEK and on 3 August 1998 then returned to Apollon. After two seasons with the club he played for lower-division clubs, such as Akratitos, Panelefsiniakos and Marko before retiring in 2003.
