= Igor Klejch =

Slovak footballer (born 1964)

Personal information
- Date of birth: 28 March 1964 (age 62)
- Place of birth: Czechoslovakia
- Position: Forward

Youth career
- 1974–1975: TJ Tatran Bzenica

Senior career*
Years	Team	Apps	(Gls)
1984–1985	Spartak Trnava		
1985–1986	Dukla Banská Bystrica		
1986–1987	Liptovský Mikuláš		
1987–1990	Spartak Trnava		
1990–1992	Nitra	?	(29)
1992–1993	Baník Ostrava	14	(1)
1993–1995	Svit Zlín	44	(16)
1995–1998	Panachaiki	94	(25)
1998	AEL	3	(0)
1998–2000	Senica		
- * Club domestic league appearances and goals

Igor Klejch (born 28 March 1964) is a Slovak former professional footballer who played as a forward for clubs in Czechoslovakia and Greece.

== Club career ==
Klejch began playing football in the Czechoslovak First League, making 149 appearances before the league split in 1992, including 28 appearances for FC Nitra during the 1990–91 season. He would become the leading goal-scorer in the Slovak second division the following season. Klejch played for Baník Ostrava and Svit Zlín in the Czech First League, scoring a total of 17 goals in 58 appearances over two league seasons. Klejch finished his time in Czechoslovakia, including the successor state Czech Republic, with 58 goals from 208 top flight matches.

In July 1995, Klejch joined Super League Greece side Panachaiki for the three seasons and would appear in 94 league matches and score 25 goals for the club.
