= Kavala F.C. =

Greek football club, based in Kavala

Kavala
- Full name: Αθλητικός Όμιλος Καβάλα (Athletic Club Kavala)
- Nicknames: Γαλάζιοι Αργοναύτες (Blue Argonauts); Ελαφρά Ταξιαρχία του Βορρά (Light Brigade of the North)
- Short name: AOK
- Founded: 24 September 1965; 61 years ago
- Ground: Anthi Karagianni Stadium
- Capacity: 10,550
- Chairman: Eleftherios Chatziapostolidis
- Manager: Zoran Stoinović
- League: Gamma Ethniki
- 2025–26: Super League Greece 2 (North Group), 7th (relegated)
- Website: Official website
Home colours	Away colours

Kavala Football Club (Greek: Αθλητικός Όμιλος Καβάλα, lit. 'Athletic Club Kavala') are a Greek professional football club based in the city of Kavala, Greece. They compete in the Gamma Ethniki, the third tier of the Greek football league system. The club's home ground is the Anthi Karagianni Stadium.

== History ==
The club was formed in 1965 from the merger of Phillipoi Kavala, Iraklis Kavala and A.E. Kavala.

They have had a few runs in the top division of the Greek League. They were promoted to Alpha Ethniki for the first time in 1969 and stayed up for six years (1970 through 1975). They returned to the top division in 1976 and played again for six seasons.

In 1982, the club were relegated to Beta Ethniki (second tier of Greek football). After eleven years in Beta Ethniki and one year in Gamma Ethniki (third tier – 1988–89) they were promoted to Alpha Ethniki. Their "black" period began for the team in which they played only in Beta Ethniki and Gamma Ethniki.

=== 2009–10 season ===
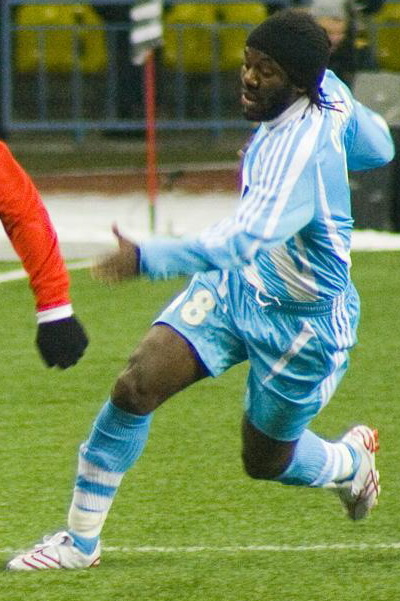
Wilson Oruma

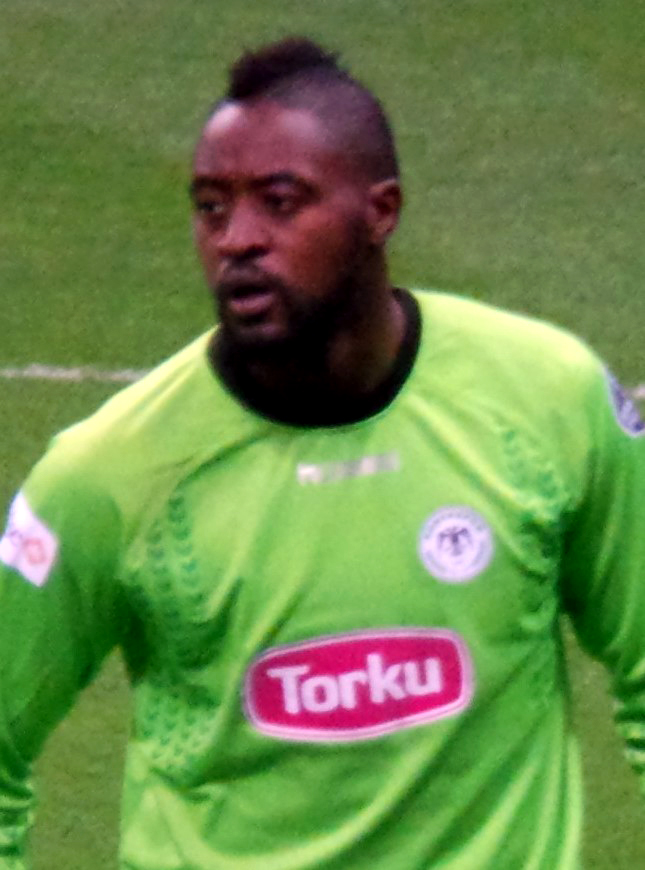
Charles Itandje

In 2009, they signed Miltiadis Sapanis and EURO 2004 winner Fanis Katergiannakis. Kavala were promoted for the first time in 9 years to Greeces top division. In their quest to remain in the top flight they have signed Pepe Reina's back up at Liverpool, Charles Itandje and recently acquired Brazilian Denílson (January 2010 transfer window) a 2002 World Cup Winner. Additional season signings include Craig Moore, Željko Kalac, Ebi Smolarek, Diogo Rincón, Sotiris Leontiou, Serge Dié, Wilson Oruma and Frédéric Mendy. This combined with coach Aad de Mos meant that Kavala set the league alight. They subsequently achieved notable victories in the 2009–2010 season against Iraklis, Panionios, AEK Athens and Panathinaikos.

=== 2010–11 season ===
Ending in sixth place, the team entered the transfer season. In July, the Spanish goalkeeper, Javier Lopez Vallejo (who played in Real Zaragoza) was added to the roster. The team's owner sought the new manager throughout Europe and settled on the Serbian coach Dragan Okuka who lasted until November, when he was replaced by Henryk Kasperczak. In Kasperczak's debut as a coach, Kavala beat AEK, 2–1, in what was considered a very good appearance.

But in March 2011, Kasperczak, retired as the coach of this team, and he was replaced by Ioannis Matzourakis, who was the coach in the Kavala team during the 1985–1986 season. Kavala finished seventh and, later faced the threat of relegation to Football League (Greece) due to the match-fixing scandal. After an appeal, the team managed to avoid relegation by starting the new league with eight points less. On 23 August, however, the Professional Sports Committee stripped both Kavala and Olympiacos Volos from their professional licence and demoted them to the Delta Ethniki.

=== 2011–12 season ===
Kavala competed in Delta Ethniki Group 1. They only finished fourth, but were promoted two divisions to the Football League for 2012/13 after it was ruled that their demotion to Delta Ethniki in 2011 was as a result of government intervention and should not have been implemented by the football authorities.

=== 2013–14 season ===
In September 2013, Germans investors took control of Kavala. The agreement ensured that the new investors will pay off significant part of its debts to old players.

Indeed, the Germans bought a majority stake of the shares of Kavala, paying a €500,000 clause in the first season and €700,000 for the second, respectively.

=== 2014–present ===
In the summer of 2014, a steering committee took over the management and operation of the club. In May 2015, the amateur club announced that the liquidation process of "Nea Kavala S.A." (PAE Nea Kavala) had been approved. Eventually, after 5 years in the Gamma Ethniki, Kavala was crowned champion of Group 1 in 2019 and earned promotion to the Football League. On 13 June 2021, Kavala secured direct promotion to the Super League 2 for the 2021–22 season with 2 matches remaining in the league. However, the club was initially denied a participation certificate due to an ownership issue within the PAE. The legal team of the PAE appealed the decision of the Professional Sports Committee (EEA), which was rejected on 30 August 2021. Consequently, Kavala was excluded from Super League 2, leading the amateur body on 20 August 2021 (prior to the final EEA ruling) to register the team for the Gamma Ethniki as a safety net. On 30 October, Kavala, alongside APS Zakynthos, was vindicated by the Hellenic Football Federation (EPO) and granted entry into Super League 2. Due to the administrative delay, the team was forced to compete during the first half of the season with youth players aged 15–18, many of whom had no prior experience in organized club football.

The tumultuous 2021–22 season began with Kavala suffering heavy defeats without registering a single league victory. In December 2021, under then-owner Alex Haditaghi, the club launched an effort to avoid relegation from Super League 2 by signing experienced professional footballers. The squad's performance improved significantly, putting them back in contention for survival. Ultimately, however, the team fell short by just two points, resulting in Kavala's relegation back to the amateur Gamma Ethniki.

The club competed in the Gamma Ethniki during the 2022–23 and 2023–24 seasons. In the first season, it missed out on first place and a spot in the promotion play-offs for Super League 2 by just four points. In the following season, the team mounted an impressive campaign, finishing 1st with 97 points—suffering only a single defeat alongside a 21-game winning streak—and secured its return to Super League 2. Notably, during that same season, Kavala also captured the Kavala FCA Cup, completing the first double in its history.

In the 2024–25 season, Kavala secured its survival in Super League 2 by fine margins, going undefeated throughout the play-out stage. In the 2025–26 season, the club competed in the play-outs once again, finishing in 7th place and suffering relegation back to the Gamma Ethniki.

== Crest ==
The emblem of the club is the ancient trireme, as architecture engineer Christos Batsis designed it. According to the instigator of the emblem of Kavala, the boat is a trireme, where the oars are the footballers, the cloth the administration and the fancy the fans of the club. These three elements together lead Kavala to the harbors that are the targets the team puts each time. All of this certainly has to do with the fact that Kavala is a coastal city and its world closely related to the wet element. The original element of the emblem of Kavala was hanging on the door of the design of the late Christos Batsis until he died.

For a while, the emblem contained the then name of the "Puma Nea Kavala Football Club" team.

== Stadium ==
The Anthi Karagianni Stadium, formerly the Kavala National Stadium, is a multi-purpose stadium in Kavala, Greece. It is the homebase of Kavala. The stadium was built in 1970, and currently has a seating capacity of 10,500. It is named after the paralympic athlete, Anthi Karagianni, who won three silver medals in the 2004 Paralympic Games.

== Rivalries ==
Matches between Kavala and Doxa Drama draw significant interest, carrying the character of a local derby in a longstanding regional rivalry.

== Honours ==
=== Domestic ===
League

- Second Division
  - Winners (4): 1966–67, 1968–69, 1975–76, 1995–96
  - Runners-up (1): 1993–94
- Third Division
  - Winners (3): 2007–08, 2018–19, 2023–24
  - Runners-up (3): 1989–90, 2020–21, 2022–23

Cup

- Kavala FCA Cup
  - Winners (2): 2017–18, 2023–24
- Kavala FCA Super Cup
  - Winners (2): 2018, 2024

== Achievements ==
- Greek Cup
  - Semi-finals: 1964–65, 1994–95, 2009–10

=== International ===
- Balkans Cup
  - Group stage: 1972

== League participation ==
- First Division (19): 1969–1975, 1976–1982, 1994–1995, 1996–2000, 2009–2011
- Second Division (25): 1965–1969, 1975–1976, 1982–1989, 1990–1994, 1995–1996, 2000–2001, 2002–2003, 2008–2009, 2012–2014, 2021–2022, 2024–2026
- Third Division (17): 1989–1990, 2001–2002, 2003–2008, 2014–2021, 2022–2024, 2026–present
- Fourth Division (1): 2011–2012

== Recent seasons ==
Season	Category	Position	Cup
2000–01	Beta Ethniki (2nd division)	13th ↓	GS
2001–02	Gamma Ethniki (3rd division)	4th ↑	GS
2002–03	Beta Ethniki (2nd division)	14th ↓	1R
2003–04	Gamma Ethniki (3rd division)	17th	1R
2004–05	Gamma Ethniki (3rd division)	3rd	1R
2005–06	Gamma Ethniki (3rd division)	7th	3R
2006–07	Gamma Ethniki (3rd division)	5th	1R
2007–08	Gamma Ethniki (3rd division)	1st ↑	1R
2008–09	Beta Ethniki (2nd division)	3rd ↑	4R
2009–10	Super League (1st division)	**6th**	SF
2010–11	Super League (1st division)	7th ↓	5R
2011–12	Delta Ethniki (4th division)	4th ↑	—
2012–13	Football League (2nd division)	11th	4R
2013–14	Football League (2nd division)	13th ↓	1R
2014–15	Gamma Ethniki (3rd division)	3rd	—
2015–16	Gamma Ethniki (3rd division)	4th	—
2016–17	Gamma Ethniki (3rd division)	6th	—
2017–18	Gamma Ethniki (3rd division)	3rd	—
2018–19	Gamma Ethniki (3rd division)	1st	1R
2019–20	Football League (3rd division)	6th	5R
2020–21	Football League (3rd division)	2nd ↑	—
2021–22	Super League 2 (2nd division)	14th ↓	—
2022–23	Gamma Ethniki (3rd division)	2nd	—
2023–24	Gamma Ethniki (3rd division)	1st ↑	—
2024–25	Super League 2 (2nd division)	8th	4R
2025–26	Super League 2 (2nd division)	7th ↓	LF
2026–27	Gamma Ethniki (3rd division)		—

Best position in bold.

Key: 1R = First Round, 2R = Second Round, 3R = Third Round, 4R = Fourth Round, 5R = Fifth Round, LF = League Phase, GS = Group Stage, QF = Quarter-finals, SF = Semi-finals.

== Personnel ==
Technical staff
Owner	(Canada) Alex Haditaghi
President	(Greece) Andreas Sklaris
Curator of Football	(Greece) Argyris Spanidis
Technical director	(Greece) Savvas Gentsoglou

=== Coaching staff ===
- Manager: (Serbia) Zoran Stoinović
- Assistant manager: (Greece) Nikos Karabiberis
- Assistant manager: (Greece) Georgios Angelidis
- Goalkeeping coach: (Greece) Giannis Georgiadis
- Fitness coach: (Greece) Nikolaos Laskaris

=== Notable Managers ===
The following managers won at least one national trophy when in charge of Kavala F.C.:

Name	Period	Trophies
(North Macedonia) Jane Janevski	1975–1977	Football League
(Greece) Georgios Paraschos	1995–1996	Football League
(Greece) Stratos Voutsakelis	2007–2008	Gamma Ethniki
(Greece) Konstantinos Anyfantakis	2017–2018	Kavala FCA Cup
(Greece) Pavlos Dermitzakis	2018–2019	Gamma Ethniki

=== Most Serving Managers ===
Name	Period	Days
(Serbia) Béla Pálfi	1969–1975	2065
(Greece) Georgios Paraschos	1995–1997, 1999–2000	941
(Greece) Vasilios Daniil	1979–1981	911
(Greece) Pavlos Dermitzakis	2018–2020	730
(North Macedonia) Jane Janevski	1975–1977	730

=== Gallery ===
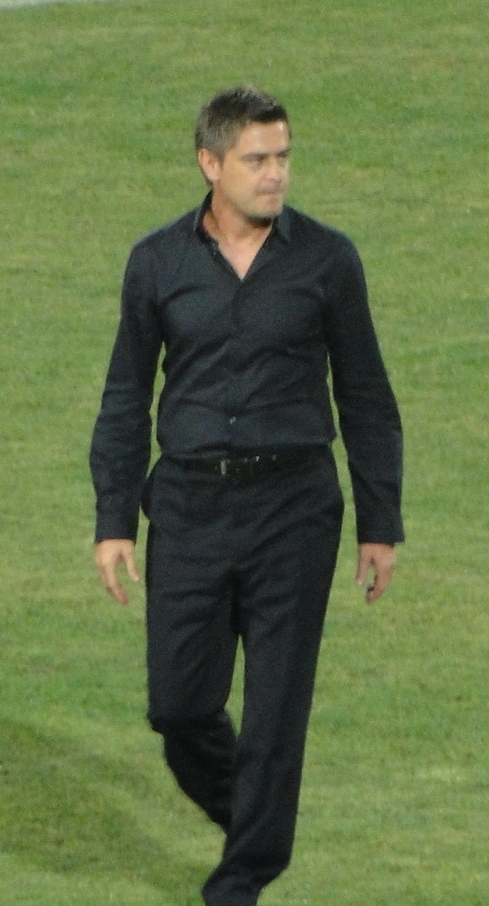
Pavlos Dermitzakis 2018–2020

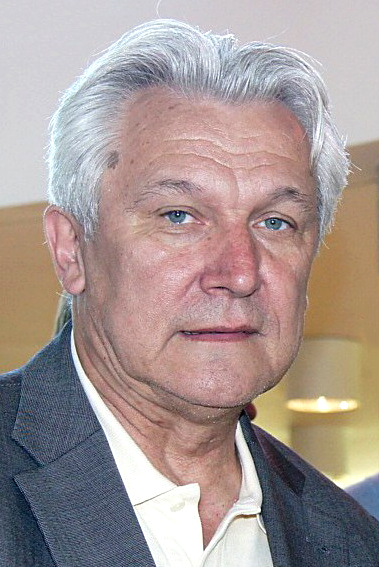
Henryk Kasperczak 2010–2011

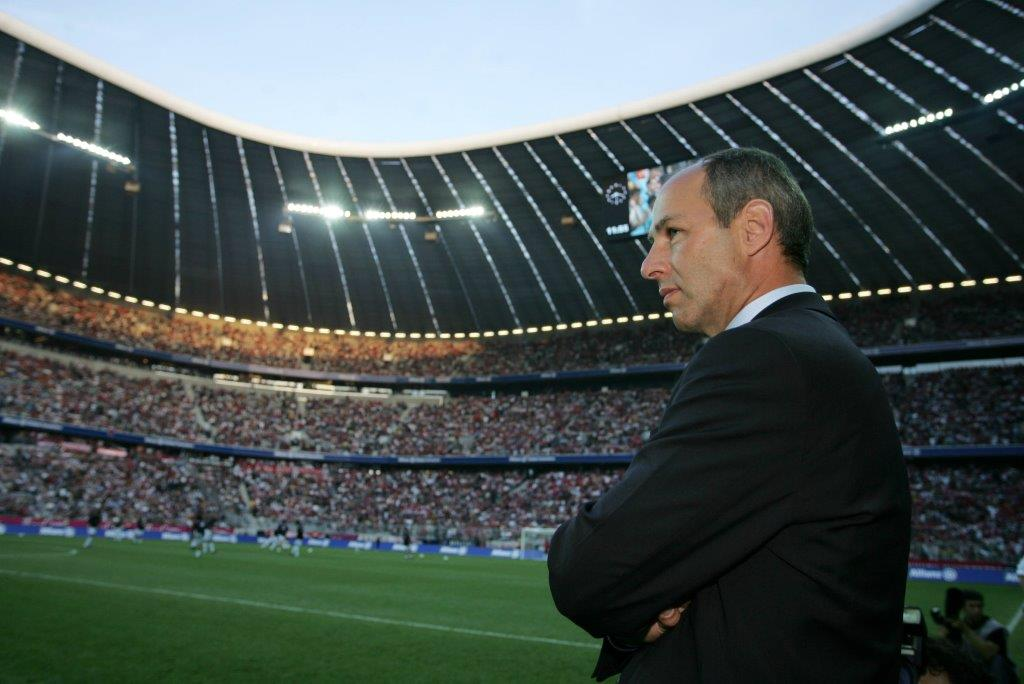
Reiner Maurer 2008

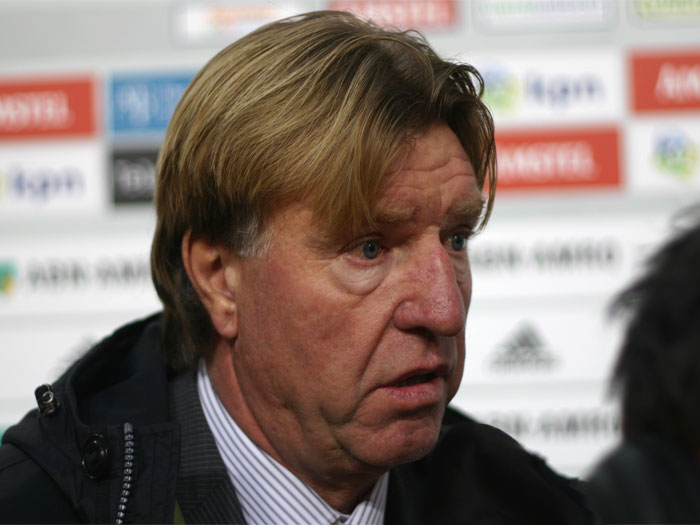
Aad de Mos 2010

== Record players ==
Name	Apps
(Greece) Georgios Mallios	171
(Greece) Georgios Koltsis	124
(Greece) Konstantinos Vakirtzis	117
(Greece) Georgios Peglis	114
(Greece) Anestis Athanasiadis	109
(Poland) Leszek Pisz	101
(Greece) Kyrillos Kallimanis	91
(Bulgaria) Ivan Mitev	85
(Greece) Anastasios Tsapanidis	82
(Greece) Panagiotis Logaras	79

Name	Goals
(Poland) Leszek Pisz	26
(Nigeria) Benjamin Onwuachi	24
(Greece) Nikos Soultanidis	23
(Greece) Anestis Athanasiadis	22
(Greece) Giorgos Papandreou	21
(Greece) Georgios Nasiopoulos	19
(Greece) Georgios Mallios	10
(Poland) Bartosz Tarachulski	8
(Ivory Coast) Serge Dié	7
(Greece) Dimitrios Orfanos	7
