= 1987–88 Panathinaikos F.C. season =

Panathinaikos
1987–88 season
- Chairman: (Greece) Yiorgos Vardinogiannis
- Manager: (Greece) Vassilis Daniil (Sweden) Gunder Bengtsson
- Alpha Ethniki: 5th
- Greek Cup: Winners
- UEFA Cup: Quarter-finals
Home colours	Away colours

In the 1987–88 season Panathinaikos played for 29th consecutive time in Greece's top division, the Alpha Ethniki. They also competed in the UEFA Cup and the Greek Cup.

Panathinaikos finished fifth in the league table.

== Squad ==
Note: Flags indicate national team as defined under FIFA eligibility rules; some limited exceptions apply. Players may hold more than one non-FIFA nationality.

No.	Pos.	Nation	Player
—	GK	GRE	Antonis Minou
—	GK	GRE	Nikos Sarganis
—	DF	GRE	Kostas Mavridis
—	DF	GRE	Nikos Karoulias
—	DF	GRE	Lysandros Georgamlis
—	DF	GRE	Christos Vasileiou
—	DF	GRE	Nikos Vamvakoulas
—	MF	GRE	Kostas Antoniou

No.	Pos.	Nation	Player
—	MF	AUS	Chris Kalantzis
—	MF	GRE	Vangelis Vlachos
—	MF	YUG	Velimir Zajec
—	MF	GRE	Dimitris Saravakos (captain)
—	MF	ARG	Juan Ramon Rocha
—	MF	GRE	Paris Georgakopoulos
—	FW	GRE	Thanasis Dimopoulos
—	FW	GRE	Christos Dimopoulos

== Competitions ==
=== Alpha Ethniki ===
==== League table ====
Pos	Team	Pld	W	D	L	GF	GA	GD	Pts	Qualification or relegation
3	PAOK	30	17	5	8	60	27	+33	39	Qualification for UEFA Cup first round
4	OFI	30	17	3	10	54	41	+13	37	
5	Panathinaikos	30	15	6	9	47	34	+13	36	Qualification for Cup Winners' Cup first round
6	Iraklis	30	13	8	9	42	32	+10	34	
7	Ethnikos Piraeus	30	12	8	10	27	28	−1	32	

Source: RSSSF
Rules for classification: 1st points; 2nd head-to-head points; 3rd head-to-head goal difference; 4th decision match.

=== Greek Cup ===
==== Final ====
8 May 1988	Panathinaikos	2–2 (a.e.t.) (4–3 p)	Olympiacos	Marousi
	Saravakos 31' (pen.); Dimopoulos 102'	Report	Funes 59' (pen.), 98' (pen.)	Stadium: Olympic Stadium; Attendance: 73,375; Referee: Meletis Voutsaras (Athens)
	Penalties
	Vlachos (penalty scored); Sarganis (penalty scored); Dimopoulos (penalty scored); Georgamlis (penalty scored)		(penalty scored) Alexiou; (penalty scored) Baniotis; (penalty missed) Chatzidis; (penalty scored) Apostolakis; (penalty missed) Funes

=== UEFA Cup ===
==== First round ====
16 September 1987 First leg	Panathinaikos (Greece)	2–0	(France) Auxerre	Athens, Greece
	Barret 9' (o.g.); Vlachos 51'			Stadium: Olympic Stadium; Attendance: 75,000; Referee: Siegfried Kirschen (East Germany)

30 September 1987 Second leg	Auxerre (France)	3–2 (3–4 agg.)	(Greece) Panathinaikos	Auxerre, France
	Dutuel 23'; Cantona 41'; Courtet 73'		Vasiliou 31'; Saravakos 44'	Stadium: Stade de l'Abbé-Deschamps; Attendance: 21,000; Referee: Luigi Agnolin (Italy)

==== Second round ====
21 October 1987 First leg	Panathinaikos (Greece)	1–0	(Italy) Juventus	Athens, Greece
	Saravakos 6'			Stadium: Olympic Stadium; Attendance: 60,000; Referee: Ron Bridges (Wales)

4 November 1987 Second leg	Juventus (Italy)	3–2 (3–3a agg.)	(Greece) Panathinaikos	Turin, Italy
	Cabrini 49', 72' (pen.); Alessio 59'		Saravakos 46'; C. Dimopoulos 53'	Stadium: Stadio Comunale Vittorio Pozzo; Attendance: 50,000; Referee: Joël Quiniou (France)

==== Third round ====
25 November 1987 First leg	Budapesti Honvéd (Hungary)	5–2	(Greece) Panathinaikos	Budapest, Hungary
	Kovács 2', 32', 58', 61'; Fodor 24' (pen.)		Saravakos 65', 88'	Stadium: Bozsik József Stadion; Attendance: 15,000; Referee: Henning Lund-Sørensen (Denmark)

9 December 1987 Second leg	Panathinaikos (Greece)	5–1 (7–6 agg.)	(Hungary) Budapesti Honvéd	Athens, Greece
	Vlachos 23', 37'; Antoniou 55'; Mavridis 65'; Batsinilas 82'		Fitos 60'	Stadium: Olympic Stadium; Attendance: 80,000; Referee: Dušan Krchňák (Czechoslovakia)

==== Quarter-finals ====
2 March 1988 First leg	Panathinaikos (Greece)	2–2	(Belgium) Club Brugge	Athens, Greece
	Saravakos 54'; Antoniou 60'		Ceulemans 55'; Degryse 86'	Stadium: Olympic Stadium; Attendance: 75,000; Referee: Aron Schmidhuber (West Germany)

16 March 1988 Second leg	Club Brugge (Belgium)	1–0 (3–2 agg.)	(Greece) Panathinaikos	Bruges, Belgium
	Brylle 44'			Stadium: Olympiastadion; Attendance: 15,000; Referee: Adolf Prokop (East Germany)
