= 1985–86 Panathinaikos F.C. season =

Panathinaikos
1985–86 season
- Chairman: (Greece) Yiorgos Vardinogiannis
- Manager: (Poland) Kazimierz Górski/ (Czech Republic) Petr Packert
- Alpha Ethniki: Winners
- Greek Cup: Winners
- UEFA Cup: Round of 64
Home colours	Away colours

In the 1985–86 season Panathinaikos played for 27th consecutive time in Greece's top division, the Alpha Ethniki. They also competed in the UEFA Cup and the Greek Cup.

== Squad ==
Note: Flags indicate national team as defined under FIFA eligibility rules; some limited exceptions apply. Players may hold more than one non-FIFA nationality.

No.	Pos.	Nation	Player
—	GK	GRE	Antonis Minou
—	GK	GRE	Nikos Sarganis
—	DF	GRE	Kostas Mavridis
—	DF	GRE	Nikos Karoulias
—	DF	GRE	Lysandros Georgamlis
—	DF	GRE	Nikos Vamvakoulas
—	MF	GRE	Kostas Antoniou
—	MF	GRE	Spiros Livathinos
—	MF	GRE	Vangelis Vlachos

No.	Pos.	Nation	Player
—	MF	YUG	Velimir Zajec
—	MF	GRE	Dimitris Saravakos (captain)
—	MF	GRE	Giannis Kyrastas
—	MF	ARG	Juan Ramon Rocha
—	FW	GRE	Grigoris Charalampidis
—	FW	GRE	Thanasis Dimopoulos
—	FW	GRE	Christos Dimopoulos

== Competitions ==
=== Alpha Ethniki ===
==== League table ====
Pos	Team	Pld	W	D	L	GF	GA	GD	Pts	Qualification or relegation
1	Panathinaikos (C)	30	18	7	5	58	26	+32	43	Qualification for European Cup first round
2	OFI	30	16	6	8	41	31	+10	38	Qualification for UEFA Cup first round (Note: AEK Athens and Iraklis tied at third place with 36 points. Despite AEK was found guilty for bribe against Panserraikos, the HFF punished the club with three points deduction from 1986–87 season. A play-off game was scheduled to play in Volos on 23 June. Iraklis made a protest and showed up with 10 players. At the 53rd minute with the score at 0–0, the match interrupted permanently. At this minute Iraklis after two red cards and 2 injuries, stay with 6 players on the pitch. The game forfeited to AEK with 2–0.)
3	AEK Athens	30	13	10	7	42	28	+14	36	Qualification for UEFA Cup first round
4	Iraklis	30	14	8	8	34	22	+12	36	
5	Olympiacos	30	14	6	10	57	42	+15	34	Qualification for Cup Winners' Cup first round (Note: Since Panathinaikos, winners of 1985–86 Greek Football Cup, were qualified for the 1986–87 European Cup, losing cup finalists Olympiacos earned a spot in the first round of the 1986–87 European Cup Winners' Cup.)

Source: RSSSF
Rules for classification: 1st points; 2nd head-to-head points; 3rd head-to-head goal difference; 4th decision match.
(C) Champions

=== Greek Cup ===
==== Final ====
The 44th Greek Cup Final was played at the Athens Olympic Stadium "Spyridon Louis".

28 May 1986	Panathinaikos	4–0	Olympiacos	Marousi
	Vlachos 24'; Dimopoulos 52'; Saravakos 57', 72'		Mitropoulos (red card) 90+1'	Stadium: Olympic Stadium; Attendance: 72,948; Referee: Kostas Dimitriadis (Piraeus)

=== UEFA Cup ===
==== First round ====
18 September 1985 First leg	Torino (Italy)	2–1	(Greece) Panathinaikos	Turin, Italy
	Comi 48'; Mavridis 87' (o.g.)	Report	Saravakos 51'	Stadium: Stadio Comunale Vittorio Pozzo; Attendance: 46,521; Referee: Erik Fredriksson (Sweden)

2 October 1985 Second leg	Panathinaikos (Greece)	1–1 (2–3 agg.)	(Italy) Torino	Athens, Greece
	Saravakos 71' (pen.)	Report	Comi 1'	Stadium: Olympic Stadium; Attendance: 73,023; Referee: Michel Vautrot (France)
