= Derby of the Eternal Enemies =

Association football rivalry in Athens, Greece

Derby of the Eternal Enemies Ντέρμπι των αιωνίων αντιπάλων
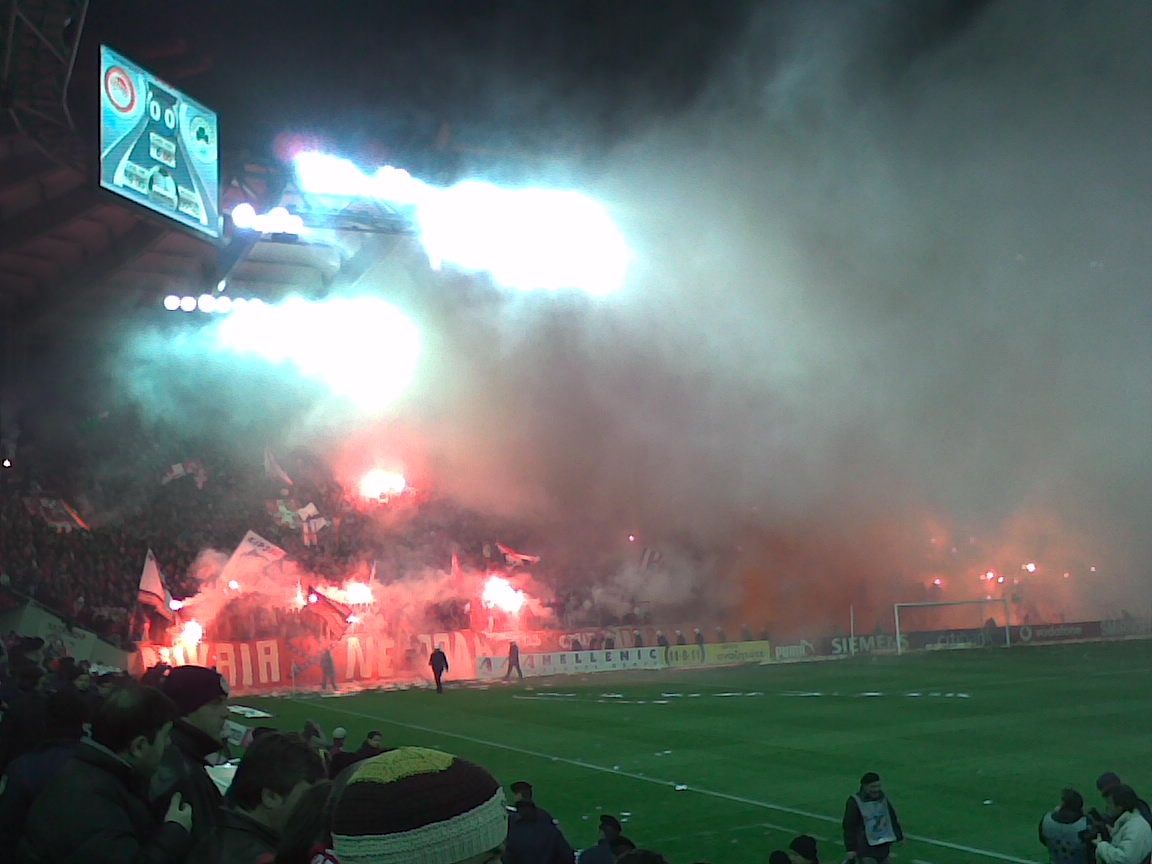
- Other names: Mother of All Battles; Μητέρα των μαχών
- Location: Athens and Piraeus, Greece
- Teams: Olympiacos; Panathinaikos
- First meeting: 28 June 1925; Friendly; Panathinaikos 3–3 Olympiacos
- Latest meeting: 11 October 2026; Super League Greece; Olympiacos 1–0 Panathinaikos
- Next meeting: TBD
- Stadiums: Karaiskakis Stadium (Olympiacos); Leoforos Alexandras Stadium/Athens Olympic Stadium (Panathinaikos)

Statistics
- Total meetings: 232 (official matches)
- Most wins: Olympiacos (93)
- Top scorer: Dimitris Saravakos (Panathinaikos) (16)
- Largest victory: Panathinaikos 8–2 Olympiacos; Panhellenic Championship (1 June 1930)
- Largest goal scoring: Olympiacos (296 goals)

The Derby of the Eternal Enemies (Greek: Ντέρμπι των αιωνίων αντιπάλων), also known among fans as the Mother of All Battles (Greek: μητέρα όλων των μαχών), is an association football derby contested between the two most successful clubs of Greece, Olympiacos from Piraeus and Panathinaikos from Athens, the two main cities in the major Athens urban area. The derby is traditionally included among the world's top 10 greatest football derbies by the international media, along with rivalries such as Real Madrid–Barcelona, Liverpool–Manchester United and Boca Juniors–River Plate. American network CNN has ranked the Olympiacos–Panathinaikos derby among the ten greatest football rivalries of all-time. In October 2014, BBC named the Olympiacos–Panathinaikos derby "Europe's maddest derby" and in September 2019, Daily Mirror ranked the derby of the eternal enemies as the fifth most important derby in the world.

== History ==
=== Cultural rivalry ===
The rivalry between the two top Greek clubs can be traced back to social, cultural and regional differences. Panathinaikos, founded in 1908, comes from Athens and was considered the classic representative of the high class and old Athenian society of the Greek capital. On the other hand, Olympiacos was founded in 1925 and comes from the port city of Piraeus, thus attracting supporters from the surrounding working class areas. Both cities have played a major role in Greek history since classical antiquity.

These class differences between the people in the homelands of the two clubs offered further reasons for the animosity between their fans. Olympiacos' early success provided a way for the people of Piraeus to express their contempt for the wealthier classes. Furthermore, Olympiacos attracted fans from all over Greece who believed themselves to be victims of social and political unfairness.

=== Fans' rivalry ===
Olympiacos and Panathinaikos are the most popular Greek clubs, with both sides having large fanbases that follow them in domestic and international matches. Football hooliganism is a very common phenomenon between their fans in recent years, featuring anything from breaking seats and fighting to fireworks and street rioting.

=== Football rivalry ===
Both clubs have been in the top flight of Greek football since 1929, among the longest spells on the Continent. Their football departments attract the most fans, but the rivalry also extends into other team sports such as basketball, volleyball and water polo.

Domestically, Olympiacos is the most successful football club in Greece, having won a record 84 major official titles compared to Panathinaikos' 44 titles and also being the most successful in their head-to-head fixtures.

Until 2024, Panathinaikos boasted of their better performance in European competitions. Their greatest success is the participation in the European Cup final in 1971, two semi-final appearances in the UEFA Champions League (1985, 1996) and four quarter-final appearances in the UEFA Champions League (1992, 2002) and UEFA Europa League (1988, 2003). This changed in 2024, when Olympiacos won the UEFA Conference League, becoming the first Greek team to win an official UEFA´s title. Other top performances are their campaign to the quarterfinals of the UEFA Champions League in 1999 and their campaign to the quarter-finals of the 1992–93 European Cup Winners' Cup

Official honours won
Competition	Olympiacos	Panathinaikos
Super League Greece	48	20
Greek Cup	29	20
Greek Super Cup	5	3
UEFA Conference League	1	0
Balkans Cup	1	1
Total	84	44

Unofficial honours won
Competition	Olympiacos	Panathinaikos
Greater Greece Cup	3	1

== Statistics ==
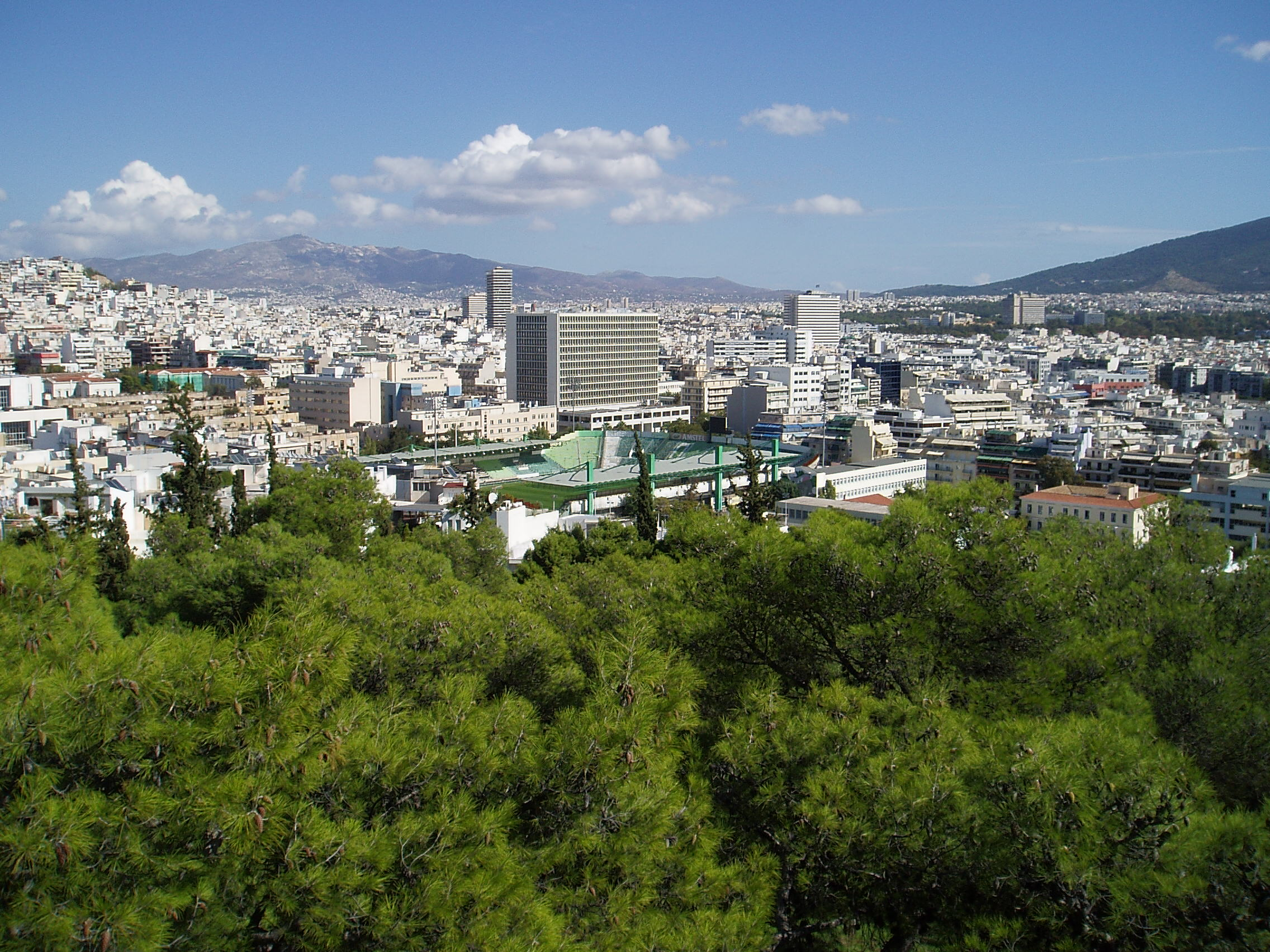
Leoforos Alexandras Stadium, home of Panathinaikos

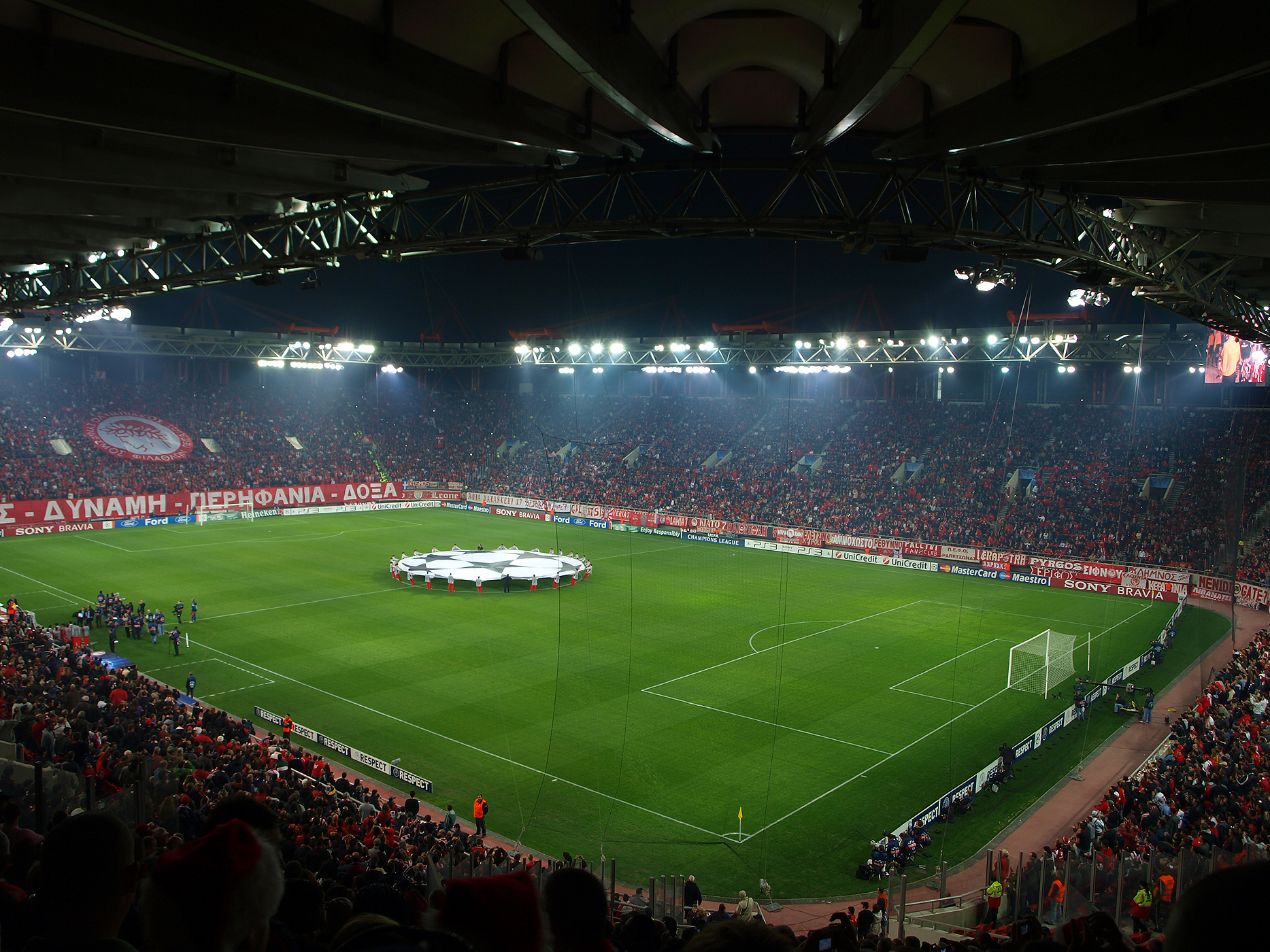
Karaiskakis Stadium, home of Olympiacos

=== Head-to-head ===
	Olympiacos wins	Draws	Panathinaikos wins
Panhellenic Championship (1927–1959)
At Olympiacos home	10	4	4
At Panathinaikos home	6	5	7
At Neutral Field	1	1	0
Total	17	10	11
Alpha Ethniki / Super League Greece (1959–present)
At Olympiacos home	34	24	16
At Panathinaikos home	21	31	22
Neutral field	1	1	0
Total	56	56	38
Greek Cup
At Olympiacos home	12	4	1
At Panathinaikos home	7	7	4
Neutral / Common field	1	2	4
Total	20	13	9
Greek League Cup
At Olympiacos home	0	1	0
At Panathinaikos home	0	1	0
Total	0	2	0
Total
232	93	81	58

=== Records ===
- Record win of the pre Alpha Ethniki era
  - Olympiacos:
    - Home: Olympiacos – Panathinaikos 6–1, Neo Phaliron Velodrome, 16 February 1936
    - Away: Panathinaikos – Olympiacos 0–3, Leoforos Alexandras Stadium, 7 May 1939
  - Panathinaikos:
    - Home: Panathinaikos – Olympiacos 8–2, Leoforos Alexandras Stadium, 1 June 1930
    - Away: Olympiacos – Panathinaikos 1–4, Karaiskakis Stadium, 3 March 1940
- Record Alpha Ethniki win
  - Olympiacos
    - Home: Olympiacos – Panathinaikos 4–0, Karaiskakis Stadium, 26 February 1967
      (Vasiliou 17', Sideris 20', 35', 62')
    - Away: Panathinaikos – Olympiacos 1–4, Leoforos Alexandras Stadium, 16 May 2021
      (Maurício 53' – Masouras 7', 12', El-Arabi 38', 72')
  - Panathinaikos
    - Home: Panathinaikos – Olympiacos 3–0, Athens Olympic Stadium, 26 January 1992
      (Marangos 18', Saravakos 30', Warzycha 78')
    - Away: Olympiacos – Panathinaikos 1–4, Karaiskakis Stadium, 24 July 1960
      (K. Papazoglou 15' – Papaemmanouil 23', 71' pen., 83', Lemos 42' o.g.)
      , Olympiacos – Panathinaikos 1–4, Athens Olympic Stadium, 8 November 1987
      (Zelilidis 22' – Michos 13' o.g., Vlachos 42', 87', Saravakos 46') and Olympiacos – Panathinaikos 0–3, Karaiskakis Stadium, 2 March 2014
      (Pranic 45', Berg 68', Abeid 89')
- Record Greek Cup win
  - Olympiacos
    - Home: Olympiacos – Panathinaikos 4–0, Karaiskakis Stadium, 13 April 1983
      (Kousoulakis 58', Anastopoulos 94', 115', 119' pen.)
      and Olympiacos – Panathinaikos 4–0, Karaiskakis Stadium, 16 January 2008
      (LuaLua 6', Torosidis 63', Kovačević 65', Núñez 80')
    - Away: Panathinaikos – Olympiacos 1–6, Leoforos Alexandras Stadium, 13 November 1932
      (Sachlikis 28' – V. Andrianopoulos 16', 68', 88', Ragos 24', Vazos 69', 70')
  - Panathinaikos
    - Common field: Panathinaikos – Olympiacos 4–0, Athens Olympic Stadium, 28 May 1986
      (Vlachos 24', Dimopoulos 52', Saravakos 57', 72')
    - Home: Panathinaikos – Olympiacos 3–2, Leoforos Alexandras Stadium, 13 January 1982
      (Charalambidis 47', 63' pen., 96' pen. – Persias 1', Anastopoulos 6')
    - Away: Olympiacos – Panathinaikos 2–3, Karaiskakis Stadium, 1 March 1995
      (Alexandris 45', Kalitzakis 58' o.g. – Kapouranis 26', Donis 71', Warzycha 89' pen.)
- Longest sequence of Alpha Ethniki wins
  - Olympiacos: 5, 8 December 1996 – 8 May 1999
    - Home: 4, 5 February 1966 – 11 May 1970
    - Away: 3, 6 April 1997 – 21 November 1999
  - Panathinaikos: 3, 11 April 1977 – 31 December 1978
    - Home: 2, 11 April 1977 – 12 February 1978
    - Away: 2, 11 May 1970 – 20 February 1972
- Longest sequence of Greek Cup wins
  - Olympiacos: 3, 14 July 1965 – 9 July 1969 and 3 May 1953 – 7 August 1960
    - Home: 6, 26 March 1939 – 9 July 1969
    - Away: 2, 26 June 1966 – 21 July 1968 and 22 February 1995–present
  - Panathinaikos: 3, 8 June 1977 – 13 April 1983 and 6 February 1985 – 8 May 1988
    - Home: 4, 8 June 1977 – 4 April 1990
    - Away: 1
- Longest sequence of unbeaten Alpha Ethniki matches
  - Olympiacos: 11, 11 May 1980 – 7 November 1985
    - Home: 10, 8 December 1996 – 4 March 2007
    - Away: 8, 2 November 1980 – 6 November 1988
  - Panathinaikos: 7, 8 November 1987 – 10 March 1991
    - Home: 7, 14 February 1960 – 6 November 1966
    - Away: 5, 8 November 1987 – 13 December 1992
- Longest sequence of unbeaten Greek Cup matches
  - Olympiacos: 18, 13 November 1932 – 8 June 1977
    - Home: 10, 14 July 1965 – 20 February 1985
    - Away: 8, 13 November 1932 – 8 June 1977
  - Panathinaikos: 4, 6 February 1985 – 22 March 1990
    - home: 7, 8 June 1977 – 22 February 1995
    - away: 3, 11 March 1992 – 16 January 2008
- Attendance records (in Athens Olympic Stadium)
  - 74,452 Olympiacos – Panathinaikos 0–0, 18 November 1984
  - 74,252 Olympiacos – Panathinaikos 2–1, 16 February 1987
  - 74,146 Panathinaikos – Olympiacos 1–1, 31 March 1985
  - 73,700 Panathinaikos – Olympiacos 1–2, 16 March 1986
  - 73,525 Panathinaikos – Olympiacos 1–1, 20 September 1986

== Matches list ==
=== Super League Greece (1959 – present) ===
	Olympiacos – Panathinaikos					Panathinaikos – Olympiacos				
Season	R.	Date	Venue	Atten.	Score	R.	Date	Venue	Atten.	Score
1959–60	30	24–07–1960	Karaiskakis Stadium	11,141	1–4	15	14–02–1960	Leoforos Alexandras Stadium	22,195	0–0
1960–61	15	29–01–1961	Karaiskakis Stadium	N/A	1–0	30	25–06–1961	Leoforos Alexandras Stadium	23,083	1–0
1961–62	15	28–01–1962	Karaiskakis Stadium	21,915	1–2	30	17–06–1962	Leoforos Alexandras Stadium	25,865	1–1
1962–63	7	11–11–1962	Karaiskakis Stadium	22,839	3–2	22	17–03–1963	Leoforos Alexandras Stadium	N/A	2–0
1963–64	30	24–05–1964	Karaiskakis Stadium	34,624	0–1	15	29–12–1963	Leoforos Alexandras Stadium	25,000	1–1
1964–65	28	13–06–1965	Karaiskakis Stadium	42,151	1–1	13	10–01–1965	Leoforos Alexandras Stadium	24,888	1–1
1965–66	11	05–02–1966	Karaiskakis Stadium	40,200	1–0	26	21–05–1966	Leoforos Alexandras Stadium	24,305	1–1
1966–67	20	26–02–1967	Karaiskakis Stadium	40,620	4–0	3	06–11–1966	Leoforos Alexandras Stadium	24,833	0–1
1967–68	22	03–03–1968	Karaiskakis Stadium	36,964	1–0	5	22–11–1967	Leoforos Alexandras Stadium	22,644	1–0
1968–69	34	15–06–1969	Karaiskakis Stadium	36,963	2–1	17	26–01–1969	Leoforos Alexandras Stadium	22,820	0–0
1969–70	30	11–05–1970	Karaiskakis Stadium	39,400	0–1	13	28–12–1969	Leoforos Alexandras Stadium	22,905	0–0
1970–71	8	08–11–1970	Karaiskakis Stadium	37,200	0–1	25	28–03–1971	Leoforos Alexandras Stadium	N/A	2–2
1971–72	21	20–02–1972	Karaiskakis Stadium	38,489	0–0	4	10–10–1971	Leoforos Alexandras Stadium	25,186	3–2
1972–73	22	11–03–1973	Karaiskakis Stadium	41,045	2–0^{1}	5	06–12–1972	Leoforos Alexandras Stadium	24,450	0–1
1973–74	23	17–03–1974	Karaiskakis Stadium	41,460	1–1	6	29–10–1973	Leoforos Alexandras Stadium	24,893	1–1
1974–75	7	24–11–1974	Karaiskakis Stadium	39,166	2–1	24	29–03–1975	Leoforos Alexandras Stadium	24,839	1–1
1975–76	8	07–12–1975	Karaiskakis Stadium	39,066	4–2	23	04–04–1976	Leoforos Alexandras Stadium	24,701	0–0
1976–77	10	12–12–1976	Karaiskakis Stadium	39,080	1–1	27	11–04–1977	Leoforos Alexandras Stadium	22,910	2–0
1977–78	4	09–10–1977	Karaiskakis Stadium	39,232	1–2	21	12–02–1978	Leoforos Alexandras Stadium	23,150	1–0
1978–79	30	06–05–1979	Karaiskakis Stadium	35,576	1–0	13	31–12–1978	Leoforos Alexandras Stadium	23,150	2–3
1979–80	33	11–05–1980	Karaiskakis Stadium	35,450	1–0	16	13–01–1980	Leoforos Alexandras Stadium	23,097	2–0
1980–81	25	29–03–1981	Karaiskakis Stadium	29,550	0–0	8	02–11–1980	Leoforos Alexandras Stadium	23,200	0–1
1981–82	1	06–09–1981	Kostas Davourlis Stadium	21,350	1–1	18	31–01–1982	Leoforos Alexandras Stadium	24,000	1–1
1982–83	12	03–01–1983	Karaiskakis Stadium	35,313	2–1	29	22–05–1983	Leoforos Alexandras Stadium	24,000	0–1
1983–84	30	06–05–1984	Karaiskakis Stadium	34,023	2–1	15	08–01–1984	Leoforos Alexandras Stadium	24,400	0–0
1984–85	7	18–11–1984	Athens Olympic Stadium	74,452	0–0	22	31–03–1985	Athens Olympic Stadium	74,146	1–1
1985–86	9	09–11–1985	Athens Olympic Stadium	68,448	1–2	24	16–03–1986	Athens Olympic Stadium	73,700	1–2
1986–87	18	15–02–1987	Athens Olympic Stadium	74,252	2–1	3	21–09–1986	Athens Olympic Stadium	73,525	1–1
1987–88	7	08–11–1987	Athens Olympic Stadium	59,768	1–4	22	06–03–1988	Athens Olympic Stadium	38,539	1–1
1988–89	22	05–03–1989	Athens Olympic Stadium	61,522	1–1	7	06–11–1988	Athens Olympic Stadium	52,679	2–1
1989–90	22	25–02–1990	Karaiskakis Stadium	27,172	3–4	5	14–10–1989	Athens Olympic Stadium	49,847	2–2
1990–91	5	19–10–1990	Karaiskakis Stadium	24,641	0–0	22	10–03–1991	Athens Olympic Stadium	46,285	0–1
1991–92	34	07–06–1992	Karaiskakis Stadium	18,029	1–1	17	26–01–1992	Athens Olympic Stadium	42,707	3–0
1992–93	13	13–12–1992	Karaiskakis Stadium	27,255	1–0	30	02–05–1993	Athens Olympic Stadium	36,702	2–3
1993–94	1	22–08–1993	Karaiskakis Stadium	20,947	0–0	18	05–01–1994	Athens Olympic Stadium	35,841	1–2
1994–95	13	28–12–1994	Karaiskakis Stadium	19,500	1–1	30	10–05–1995	Athens Olympic Stadium	9,800	1–1
1995–96	12	02–12–1995	Karaiskakis Stadium	21,277	1–2	29	28–04–1996	Athens Olympic Stadium	35,314	1–0
1996–97	11	08–12–1996	Karaiskakis Stadium	27,755	1–0	28	06–04–1997	Athens Olympic Stadium	41,951	0–2
1997–98	13	01–12–1997	Athens Olympic Stadium	35,496	3–1	30	04–04–1998	Athens Olympic Stadium	39,811	0–2
1998–99	29	09–05–1999	Athens Olympic Stadium	16,111	0–0	12	05–12–1998	Athens Olympic Stadium	28,683	2–4
1999–2000	25	26–03–2000	Athens Olympic Stadium	50,166	2–2	8	21–11–1999	Athens Olympic Stadium	30,770	2–0
2000–01	21	04–03–2001	Athens Olympic Stadium	29,048	1–0	6	12–11–2000	Leoforos Alexandras Stadium	14,669	0–0
2001–02	8	01–12–2001	Athens Olympic Stadium	40,982	2–2	21	24–03–2002	Leoforos Alexandras Stadium	14,557	1–1
2002–03	29	11–05–2003	Georgios Kamaras Stadium	10,825	3–0	14	12–01–2003	Leoforos Alexandras Stadium	13,171	3–2
2003–04	11	22–11–2003	Georgios Kamaras Stadium	9,639	1–1	26	18–04–2004	Leoforos Alexandras Stadium	11,699	2–2
2004–05	10	04–12–2004	Karaiskakis Stadium	30,856	1–0	25	10–04–2005	Leoforos Alexandras Stadium	14,860	1–0
2005–06	16	15–01–2006	Karaiskakis Stadium	31,480	3–2	1	28–08–2005	Athens Olympic Stadium	59,096	0–2
2006–07	24	04–03–2007	Karaiskakis Stadium	30,598	0–1	9	05–11–2006	Athens Olympic Stadium	40,091	1–0
2007–08	16	13–01–2008	Karaiskakis Stadium	31,310	1–1	1	02–09–2007	Leoforos Alexandras Stadium	13,430	0–0
2008–09	24	01–03–2009	Karaiskakis Stadium	28,775	0–0	9	09–11–2008	Athens Olympic Stadium	60,401	0–0
2009–10	12	29–11–2009	Karaiskakis Stadium	31,059	2–0	27	21–03–2010	Athens Olympic Stadium	61,135	0–1
2010–11	23	19–02–2011	Karaiskakis Stadium	30,845	2–1	8	30–10–2010	Athens Olympic Stadium	52,300	2–1
2011–12	10	19–11–2011	Karaiskakis Stadium	31,553	1–1	25	18–03–2012	Athens Olympic Stadium	42,130	0–3^{2}
2012–13	29	14–04–2013	Karaiskakis Stadium	32,018	1–1	14	09–12–2012	Athens Olympic Stadium	27,673	2–2
2013–14	27	02–03–2014	Karaiskakis Stadium	32,082	0–3	10	02–11–2013	Leoforos Alexandras Stadium	15,009	0–1
2014–15	8	26–10–2014	Karaiskakis Stadium	31,458	1–0	25	22–02–2015	Leoforos Alexandras Stadium	15,383	2–1
2015–16	26	13–03–2016	Karaiskakis Stadium	30,314	3–1	11	22–11–2015	Leoforos Alexandras Stadium	13,145	0–3^{3}
2016–17	10	06–11–2016	Karaiskakis Stadium	31,283	3–0	25	19–03–2017	Leoforos Alexandras Stadium	13,666	1–0
2017–18	24	04–03–2018	Karaiskakis Stadium	N/A	1–1	9	28–10–2017	Leoforos Alexandras Stadium	13,715	1–0
2018–19	10	11–11–2018	Karaiskakis Stadium	31,250	1–1	25	17–03–2019	Athens Olympic Stadium	18,976	0–3^{4}
2019–20	17	05–01–2020	Karaiskakis Stadium	N/A	1–0	4	21–09–2019	Athens Olympic Stadium	6,700	1–1
2019–20	p-o	21–06–2020	Karaiskakis Stadium	N/A	3–0	p-o	05–07–2020	Athens Olympic Stadium	N/A	0–0
2020–21	9	21–11–2020	Karaiskakis Stadium	N/A	1–0	22	14–02–2021	Leoforos Alexandras Stadium	N/A	2–1
2020–21	p-o	11–04–2021	Karaiskakis Stadium	N/A	3–1	p-o	16–05–2021	Leoforos Alexandras Stadium	N/A	1–4
2021–22	5	03–10–2021	Karaiskakis Stadium	21,321	0–0	18	16–01–2022	Leoforos Alexandras Stadium	N/A	0–0
2021–22	p-o	11–05–2022	Karaiskakis Stadium	16,085	1–2	p-o	17–04–2022	Leoforos Alexandras Stadium	13,594	1–0
2022–23	24	25–02–2023	Karaiskakis Stadium	31,487	0–0	11	06–11–2022	Leoforos Alexandras Stadium	13,907	1–1
2022–23	p-o	08–05–2023	Karaiskakis Stadium	N/A	1–0	p-o	09–04–2023	Leoforos Alexandras Stadium	14,182	2–0
2023–24	8	22–10–2023	Karaiskakis Stadium	31,914	0–3^{5}	21	04–02–2024	Leoforos Alexandras Stadium	N/A	2–0
2023–24	p-o	10–03–2024	Karaiskakis Stadium	31,500	1–3	p-o	19–05–2024	Leoforos Alexandras Stadium	8,501	2–2
2024–25	20	26–01–2025	Karaiskakis Stadium	32,646	1–1	7	06–10–2024	Athens Olympic Stadium	56,087	0–0
2024–25	p-o	30–03–2025	Karaiskakis Stadium	32,500	4–2	p-o	11–05–2025	Athens Olympic Stadium	16,052	0–1
2025–26	20	08–02–2026	Karaiskakis Stadium	32,954	0–1	4	21–09–2025	Leoforos Alexandras Stadium	11,880	1–1
2025–26	p-o	13–05–2026	Karaiskakis Stadium	30,500	1–0	p-o	19–04–2026	Leoforos Alexandras Stadium	12,100	0–2
2026–27	6	11–10–2026	Karaiskakis Stadium		1–0	19	30/31–01–2027	Athens Olympic Stadium		

^{1} Match suspended at 82nd minute (score: 3–2). Olympiacos were awarded a 2–0 win.
^{2} Match suspended at 82nd minute (score: 0–1). Olympiacos were awarded a 0–3 win.
^{3} Match suspended before the kickoff after a firework touched an Olympiacos' player sport jogger. Olympiacos were awarded a 0–3 win.
^{4} Match suspended at 70th minute (score: 0–1). Olympiacos were awarded a 0–3 win.
^{5} Match suspended at 55th minute (score: 1–1) after a Panathinaikos' player was injured and transferred to the hospital because of a firecracker that burst next to him. The player was diagnosed with horizontal nystagmus. Panathinaikos were awarded a 0–3 win.

1st place play-off match – Title match

Season	Date	Venue	Atten.	Score
1981–82	29–06–1982	Volos Municipal Stadium	5,819	2–1

=== Greek Cup ===
Season	Round	Leg	Date	Venue	Referee	Atten.	Match	Score	Winner
1932–33	Quarter-finals		13–11–1932	Leoforos Alexandras Stadium	N/A	N/A	PAO – OSFP	1–6	OSFP
1938–39	Quarter-finals		26–03–1939	Karaiskakis Stadium	(Greece) Iliadis	N/A	OSFP – PAO	2–0 (a.e.t.)	OSFP
1946–47	Round of 16		09–03–1947	Leoforos Alexandras Stadium	(Greece) Iliadis	12,341	PAO – OSFP	0–0 (a.e.t.)	OSFP
1946–47	Round of 16	Replay	30–04–1947	Karaiskakis Stadium	—	—	OSFP – PAO	2–0 (w/o) ^{1}	OSFP
1952–53	Semi-finals		03–05–1953	Leoforos Alexandras Stadium	(Greece) Gikopoulos	N/A	PAO – OSFP	1–2	OSFP
1956–57	Semi-finals		04–09–1957	Karaiskakis Stadium	(Netherlands) Horn	N/A	OSFP – PAO	1–0	OSFP
1957–58	Semi-finals		20–07–1958	Karaiskakis Stadium	(Portugal) Gouveia	N/A	OSFP – PAO	3–0	OSFP
1959–60	Final		07–08–1960	Leoforos Alexandras Stadium	(Spain) Pérez	N/A	PAO – OSFP	1–1 (a.e.t.)	OSFP
1959–60	Final	Replay	11–09–1960	Karaiskakis Stadium	(Spain) Pérez	N/A	OSFP – PAO	3–0	OSFP
1961–62	Final		27–06–1962	Nikos Goumas Stadium	(Switzerland) Mellet	28,155	OSFP – PAO	0–0 (a.e.t.); (aband.)	—
1962–63	Quarter-finals		16–06–1963	Leoforos Alexandras Stadium	(Germany) Kreitlein	N/A	PAO – OSFP	3–5	OSFP
1963–64	Semi-finals		17–06–1964	Leoforos Alexandras Stadium	(Netherlands) Mattens	N/A	PAO – OSFP	1–1 (a.e.t.)(; aband.)	—
1964–65	Final		14–07–1965	Karaiskakis Stadium	(Italy) Pieroni	N/A	OSFP – PAO	1–0	OSFP
1965–66	Quarter-finals		26–06–1966	Leoforos Alexandras Stadium	(England) Dagnall	23,227	PAO – OSFP	1–2	OSFP
1967–68	Final		21–07–1968	Leoforos Alexandras Stadium	(Romania) Bentu	22,318	PAO – OSFP	0–1	OSFP
1968–69	Final		09–07–1969	Karaiskakis Stadium	(Greece) Michas	N/A	OSFP – PAO	1–1 (a.e.t.); (draw)	PAO
1973–74	Semi-finals		08–05–1974	Karaiskakis Stadium	(France) Delaunay	N/A	OSFP – PAO	1–0	OSFP
1974–75	Final		18–06–1975	Karaiskakis Stadium	(Italy) Menegali	34,430	OSFP – PAO	1–0	OSFP
1976–77	Semi-finals		08–06–1977	Leoforos Alexandras Stadium	(Greece) Koliropoulos	N/A	PAO – OSFP	2–1 (a.e.t.)	PAO
1981–82	Round of 32		13–01–1982	Leoforos Alexandras Stadium	(Greece) Dedes	24,000	PAO – OSFP	3–2 (a.e.t.)	PAO
1982–83	Round of 16	1st Leg	09–03–1983	Leoforos Alexandras Stadium	(Greece) Pounartzis	24,000	PAO – OSFP	1–0	OSFP
1982–83	Round of 16	2nd Leg	13–04–1983	Karaiskakis Stadium	(Greece) Kanaris	35,326	OSFP – PAO	4–0 (a.e.t.)	OSFP
1984–85	Round of 16	1st Leg	06–02–1985	Athens Olympic Stadium	(Greece) Landrakis	72,033	OSFP – PAO	0–1	PAO
1984–85	Round of 16	2nd Leg	20–02–1985	Athens Olympic Stadium	(Greece) Vassaras	72,445	PAO – OSFP	2–1	PAO
1985–86	Final		28–05–1986	Athens Olympic Stadium	(Greece) Dimitriadis	72,948	PAO – OSFP	4–0	PAO
1987–88	Final		08–05–1988	Athens Olympic Stadium	(Greece) Voutsaras	73,375	PAO – OSFP	2–2 (a.e.t.); (4–3 p)	PAO
1989–90	Semi-finals	1st Leg	21–03–1990	Karaiskakis Stadium	(Greece) Nikakis	13,846	OSFP – PAO	2–1	OSFP
1989–90	Semi-finals	2nd Leg	04–04–1990	Athens Olympic Stadium	(Greece) Koukoulas	36,863	PAO – OSFP	3–3 (a.e.t.)	OSFP
1991–92	Quarter-finals	1st Leg	11–03–1992	Karaiskakis Stadium	(Greece) Zakestidis	23,622	OSFP – PAO	0–0	OSFP
1991–92	Quarter-finals	2nd Leg	08–04–1992	Athens Olympic Stadium	(Greece) Koukoulas	52,983	PAO – OSFP	1–1 (away)	OSFP
1992–93	Final		12–05–1993	Athens Olympic Stadium	(Greece) Bikas	64,532	PAO – OSFP	1–0	PAO
1994–95	Quarter-finals	1st Leg	22–02–1995	Athens Olympic Stadium	(Greece) Nikakis	37,529	PAO – OSFP	1–2	PAO
1994–95	Quarter-finals	2nd Leg	01–03–1995	Karaiskakis Stadium	(Greece) Nikakis	17,226	OSFP – PAO	2–3 (away)	PAO
1998–99	Final		05–05–1999	Athens Olympic Stadium	(Greece) Douros	57,783	OSFP – PAO	2–0	OSFP
2000–01	Quarter-finals	1st Leg	07–02–2001	Athens Olympic Stadium	(Greece) Tsagarakis	42,845	OSFP – PAO	1–1	OSFP
2000–01	Quarter-finals	2nd Leg	21–03–2001	Leoforos Alexandras Stadium	(Greece) Briakos	12,759	PAO – OSFP	1–4	OSFP
2003–04	Final		08–05–2004	Nea Smyrni Stadium	(Greece) Kasnaferis	7,500	PAO – OSFP	3–1	PAO
2007–08	Round of 16		16–01–2008	Karaiskakis Stadium	(Greece) Kakos	30,147	OSFP – PAO	4–0	OSFP
2023–24	Round of 16	1st Leg	10–01–2024	Leoforos Alexandras Stadium	(Austria) Weinberger	N/A	PAO – OSFP	1–1	PAO
2023–24	Round of 16	2nd Leg	17–01–2024	Karaiskakis Stadium	(Netherlands) Higler	N/A	OSFP – PAO	0–0 (a.e.t.); (6–7 p)	PAO
2024–25	Quarter-finals	1st Leg	15–01–2025	Athens Olympic Stadium	(Poland) Marciniak		PAO – OSFP	1–1	OSFP
2024–25	Quarter-finals	2nd Leg	05–02–2025	Karaiskakis Stadium	(Spain) Munuera		OSFP – PAO	1–0	OSFP

^{1} Panathinaikos didn't show up in the match, due to a punishment because of fielding a suspended player.
• Series won: Olympiacos 20, Panathinaikos 10.

=== Greek League Cup ===
Season	Round	Leg	Date	Venue	Referee	Atten.	Match	Score	Winner
1989–90	Semi-final	1st Leg	09–05–1990	Karaiskakis Stadium	(Greece) Dimitriadis	8,965	OSFP – PAO	1–1	OSFP
1989–90	Semi-final	2nd Leg	23–05–1990	Athens Olympic Stadium	(Greece) Vassilakis	9,371	PAO – OSFP	2–2 (away)	OSFP

• Series won: Olympiacos 1, Panathinaikos 0.

== Top scorers ==
Olympiacos	League	Cup	Total	Panathinaikos	League	Cup	Total
(Greece) Giorgos Sideris	7	6	13	(Greece) Dimitris Saravakos	7	9^{1}	16
(Greece) Nikos Anastopoulos	6	5	11	(Greece) Mimis Domazos	6	3	9
(Greece) Giannis Vazos	9	0	9	(Poland) Krzysztof Warzycha	7	2	9
(Serbia) Predrag Đorđević	7	1	8	(Greece) Andreas Papaemmanouil	5	1	6
(Cyprus) Pavlos Vasiliou	4	2	6	(Greece) Takis Trantafyllis	7	0	7

^{1} Including League Cup games.

== Penalties ==
Including all the Alpha Ethniki, Greek Cup and League Cup games since 1959–60.

Season	Match	Penalties for Olympiacos (31)	Penalties for Panathinaikos (33)
1959–60	Olympiacos – Panathinaikos 1–4		(penalty scored) Papaemmanouil 71'
1959–60 (Cup)	Olympiacos – Panathinaikos 3–0	(penalty scored) Polychroniou 35'	
1962–63	Olympiacos – Panathinaikos 3–2	(penalty scored) Sideris 83'	
1962–63 (Cup)	Panathinaikos – Olympiacos 3–5	(penalty scored) S. Papazoglou 32'	(penalty scored) Kamaras 11'
1964–65	Panathinaikos – Olympiacos 1–1	(penalty missed) Sideris 35'	
1965–66	Panathinaikos – Olympiacos 1–1		(penalty scored) Loukanidis 23'
1965–66 (Cup)	Panathinaikos – Olympiacos 1–2	(penalty scored) Sideris 82'	
1971–72	Panathinaikos – Olympiacos 3–2	(penalty scored) Karavitis 19'	
1973–74	Olympiacos – Panathinaikos 1–1	(penalty missed) Triantafyllos 65'	
1974–75	Panathinaikos – Olympiacos 1–1		(penalty scored) Antoniadis 14'
1976–77	Olympiacos – Panathinaikos 1–1	(penalty scored) Karavitis 86'	
1981–82 (Cup)	Panathinaikos – Olympiacos 3–2		(penalty missed) Anastasiadis 2' (penalty scored) Charalambidis 63' (penalty scored) Charalambidis 96'
1982–83 (Cup)	Olympiacos – Panathinaikos 4–0	(penalty scored) Anastopoulos 119'	
1984–85 (Cup)	Panathinaikos – Olympiacos 2–1	(penalty scored) Sarganis 54'	
1985–86	Olympiacos – Panathinaikos 1–2	(penalty missed) Šestić 87' (penalty scored) Anastopoulos 90'+1'	
1985–86 (Cup)	Panathinaikos – Olympiacos 4–0		(penalty missed) Saravakos 72'
1987–88 (Cup)	Panathinaikos – Olympiacos 2–2	(penalty scored) Funes 59' (penalty scored) Funes 98'	(penalty scored) Saravakos 31'
1988–89	Panathinaikos – Olympiacos 2–1		(penalty scored) Saravakos 80'
1988–89	Olympiacos – Panathinaikos 1–1	(penalty scored) Détári 15'	
1989–90	Panathinaikos – Olympiacos 2–2	(penalty scored) Détári 27'	(penalty missed) Saravakos 71'
1989–90 (Cup)	Panathinaikos – Olympiacos 3–3	(penalty scored) Détári 109'	(penalty scored) Saravakos 101'
1989–90 (L.C.)	Panathinaikos – Olympiacos 2–2		(penalty scored) Saravakos 41'
1991–92 (Cup)	Panathinaikos – Olympiacos 1–1	(penalty scored) Protasov 90'+3'	(penalty scored) Saravakos 66'
1991–92	Olympiacos – Panathinaikos 1–1		(penalty scored) Saravakos 66'
1992–93	Panathinaikos – Olympiacos 2–3		(penalty scored) Warzycha 49'
1994–95 (Cup)	Olympiacos – Panathinaikos 2–3	(penalty missed) Alexandris 90'+2'	(penalty scored) Warzycha 89'
1995–96	Olympiacos – Panathinaikos 1–2	(penalty missed) Skartados 67'	
1996–97	Olympiacos – Panathinaikos 1–0	(penalty scored) Đorđević 55'	
1997–98	Olympiacos – Panathinaikos 3–1		(penalty missed) Georgiadis 15'
2000–01 (Cup)	Olympiacos – Panathinaikos 1–1	(penalty scored) Đorđević 28'	
2000–01	Olympiacos – Panathinaikos 1–0	(penalty missed) Đorđević 40'	
2000–01 (Cup)	Panathinaikos – Olympiacos 1–4	(penalty scored) Georgatos 61'	(penalty missed) Basinas 42'
2001–02	Panathinaikos – Olympiacos 1–1	(penalty scored) Đorđević 90'+3'	
2003–04	Panathinaikos – Olympiacos 2–2		(penalty scored) Basinas 7'
2005–06	Olympiacos – Panathinaikos 3–2		(penalty scored) González 20'
2007–08	Olympiacos – Panathinaikos 1–1		(penalty missed) Papadopoulos 68'
2010–11	Panathinaikos – Olympiacos 2–1		(penalty scored) Cissé 63'
2013–14	Olympiacos – Panathinaikos 0–3	(penalty missed) Domínguez 82'	
2014–15	Olympiacos – Panathinaikos 1–0	(penalty missed) Mitroglou 81'	
2016–17	Olympiacos – Panathinaikos 3–0		(penalty missed) Ledesma 60'
2017–18	Olympiacos – Panathinaikos 1–1	(penalty scored) Fortounis 61'	(penalty scored) Mounier 87'
2019–20	Panathinaikos – Olympiacos 1–1		(penalty missed) Macheda 60' (penalty scored) Mollo 90'
2019–20 (play-offs)	Panathinaikos – Olympiacos 0–0	(penalty missed) Valbuena 45'+3'	
2020–21 (play-offs)	Olympiacos – Panathinaikos 3–1		(penalty scored) Macheda 30'
2020–21 (play-offs)	Panathinaikos – Olympiacos 1–4		(penalty missed) Villafáñez 17'
2022–23	Panathinaikos – Olympiacos 1–1		(penalty scored) Šporar 90'+13'
2023–24	Panathinaikos – Olympiacos 2–2		(penalty scored) Bakasetas 45'+5'
2024–25	Olympiacos – Panathinaikos 1–1		(penalty scored) Ioannidis 74'
2024–25 (Cup)	Olympiacos – Panathinaikos 1–0	(penalty missed) El Kaabi 90'+2'	
2024–25 (play-offs)	Olympiacos – Panathinaikos 4–2		(penalty scored) Ioannidis 75'
2024–25 (play-offs)	Panathinaikos – Olympiacos 0–1	(penalty scored) El Kaabi 60'	

== Red cards ==
Including all the Alpha Ethniki, Greek Cup and League Cup games since 1959–60.

Season	Match	Red cards for Olympiacos players (30)	Red cards for Panathinaikos players (40)
1959–60 (Cup)	Olympiacos – Panathinaikos 3–0		Nebidis 82'
1961–62 (Cup)	Olympiacos – Panathinaikos 0–0	S. Papazoglou 5' A. Papazoglou 43'	Papaemmanouil 5'
1968–69 (Cup)	Olympiacos – Panathinaikos 1–1	Botinos 77'	V. Mitropoulos 51'
1969–70	Panathinaikos – Olympiacos 0–0	Aganian 50'	Dimitriou 60'
1971–72	Panathinaikos – Olympiacos 3–2	Triantafyllos 64'	Tomaras 64'
1972–73	Olympiacos – Panathinaikos 3–2	Triantafyllos 38'	Papadimitriou 27' Athanasopoulos 80'
1976–77 (Cup)	Panathinaikos – Olympiacos 2–1	Galakos 13'	Gonios 8' B. Đorđević 13'
1977–78	Olympiacos – Panathinaikos 1–2	Kyrastas 40' Siokos 41'	Papadimitriou 40' Álvarez 43'
1980–81	Panathinaikos – Olympiacos 0–1	S. Papadopoulos 79'	
1980–81	Olympiacos – Panathinaikos 0–0	Sarganis 88'	
1981–82	Olympiacos – Panathinaikos 1–1		Katsiakos 41'
1981–82 (Cup)	Panathinaikos – Olympiacos 3–2		Galakos 86'
1981–82	Panathinaikos – Olympiacos 1–1	Xanthopoulos 68' Vamvakoulas 84'	Karoulias 68'
1982–83	Olympiacos – Panathinaikos 2–1		Livathinos 35'
1982–83	Panathinaikos – Olympiacos 0–1	Albertsen 40'	
1983–84	Panathinaikos – Olympiacos 0–0	Albertsen 28'	
1984–85 (Cup)	Panathinaikos – Olympiacos 2–1	Vamvakoulas 82'	
1985–86	Olympiacos – Panathinaikos 1–2		Rocha 71'
1985–86 (Cup)	Panathinaikos – Olympiacos 4–0	T. Mitropoulos 90'+2'	
1986–87	Olympiacos – Panathinaikos 2–1	Barrios 81'	
1987–88 (Cup)	Panathinaikos – Olympiacos 2–2		Batsinilas 79'
1989–90 (Cup)	Panathinaikos – Olympiacos 3–3		Kourbanas 109'
1991–92 (Cup)	Olympiacos – Panathinaikos 0–0		Kalitzakis 81'
1991–92	Olympiacos – Panathinaikos 1–1		Karageorgiou 89'
1992–93	Panathinaikos – Olympiacos 2–3	Batista 89'	
1992–93 (Cup)	Panathinaikos – Olympiacos 1–0	Karataidis 50'	
1994–95	Panathinaikos – Olympiacos 1–1	Ivić 17'	
1995–96	Panathinaikos – Olympiacos 1–0	Kalantzis 80'	
1996–97	Olympiacos – Panathinaikos 1–0		Kalitzakis 54' Kolitsidakis 89'
1996–97	Panathinaikos – Olympiacos 0–2		Kalitzakis 90' Georgiadis 90' Kolitsidakis 90'
1997–98	Olympiacos – Panathinaikos 3–1		Goumas 59' Georgiadis 61' Milojević 68'
1998–99	Panathinaikos – Olympiacos 2–4		Basinas 64' Konstantinidis 89'
1998–99 (Cup)	Olympiacos – Panathinaikos 2–0	Amanatidis 32'	
2002–03	Panathinaikos – Olympiacos 3–2		Olisadebe 87'
2003–04	Panathinaikos – Olympiacos 2–2	Giovanni 72'	
2004–05	Olympiacos – Panathinaikos 1–0		González 90'+3'
2005–06	Panathinaikos – Olympiacos 0–2		Kotsios 65' Morris 87'
2006–07	Panathinaikos – Olympiacos 1–0		Víctor 90'+3'
2007–08	Panathinaikos – Olympiacos 0–0	Antzas 90'+2'	
2008–09	Olympiacos – Panathinaikos 0–0		Sarriegi 58'
2010–11	Panathinaikos – Olympiacos 2–1	A. Papadopoulos 62'	
2010–11	Olympiacos – Panathinaikos 2–1	Torosidis 90'+4'	
2017–18	Olympiacos – Panathinaikos 1–1		Ikonomou 60'
2020–21	Panathinaikos – Olympiacos 2–1	Ba 90'+4'	
2020–21 (playoffs)	Olympiacos – Panathinaikos 3–1		Poungouras 65'
2024–25	Olympiacos – Panathinaikos 1–1	Costinha 45'+2'	Ingason 90'+4'
2024–25 (playoffs)	Olympiacos – Panathinaikos 4–2		Ioannidis 90'+2'
2026–27	Olympiacos – Panathinaikos 1–0	Saliakas 66'	

== Head-to-head ranking in Super League Greece ==
P.	60	61	62	63	64	65	66	67	68	69	70	71	72	73	74	75	76	77	78	79	80	81	82	83	84	85	86	87	88	89	90	91	92	93	94	95	96	97	98	99	00	01	02	03	04	05	06	07	08	09	10	11	12	13	14	15	16	17	18	19	20	21	22	23	24	25	26
1																																																																			
2																																																																			
3																																																																			
4																																																																			
5																																																																			
6																																																																			
7																																																																			
8																																																																			
9																																																																			
10																																																																			
11																																																																			
12																																																																			
13																																																																			
14																																																																			
15																																																																			
16																																																																			
17																																																																			
18																																																																			

Key
Olympiacos
Panathinaikos

• Total: Olympiacos 41 times higher, Panathinaikos 25 times higher.

== Players and managers in both teams ==
Players from Olympiacos to Panathinaikos

- (Greece) Kostas Papazoglou
- (Greece) Ioannis Frantzis
- (Greece) Giorgos Kapouranis
- (Greece) Georgios Delikaris
- (Greece) Eleftherios Poupakis
- (Greece) Nikos Sarganis
- (Greece) Giannis Kyrastas
- (Greece) Maik Galakos
- (Greece) Nikos Vamvakoulas
- (Greece) Stratos Apostolakis
- (Greece) Tasos Mitropoulos
- (Greece) Panagiotis Vlachodimos
- (Greece) Anastasios Avlonitis
- (Greece) Nikos Vergos
- (Greece) Theofanis Tzandaris
- (Greece) Dimitris Kolovos
- (Greece) Epaminondas Pantelakis
- (Greece) Manolis Siopis
- (Argentina) Sebastián Leto
- (Russia) Yuri Lodygin

Players from Panathinaikos to Olympiacos

- (Greece) Leonidas Kalogeropoulos
- (Greece) Charalambos Fylaktos
- (Greece) Lakis Sofianos
- (Greece) Nikos Alefantos
- (Greece) Antonis Antoniadis
- (Greece) Charis Grammos
- (Australia) (Greece) Chris Kalantzis
- (Greece) Georgios Georgiadis
- (Cyprus) Michalis Konstantinou
- (Greece) Antonios Nikopolidis
- (Greece) Giannis Zaradoukas
- (Greece) Stefanos Kapino
- (Greece) Spyros Risvanis
- (Greece) Lazaros Christodoulopoulos
- (Greece) Stefanos Evangelou
- (Greece) Sotiris Alexandropoulos
- (Greece) Alexandros Anagnostopoulos

Managers for both teams

- (Socialist Federal Republic of Yugoslavia) Stjepan Bobek
- (Greece) Lakis Petropoulos
- (Poland) Kazimierz Górski
- (Austria) Helmut Senekowitsch
- (Poland) Jacek Gmoch
- (Greece) Christos Kontis
- (Greece) Sotiris Sylaidopoulos

== See also ==
- Derby of the Eternal Enemies (basketball)
