= 1984–85 Panathinaikos F.C. season =

Panathinaikos
1984–85 season
- Chairman: Yiorgos Vardinogiannis
- Manager: Jacek Gmoch
- Alpha Ethniki: 2nd
- Greek Cup: Semi-finals
- European Cup: Semi-finals
Home colours	Away colours

In the 1984–85 season Panathinaikos played for the 26th consecutive time in Greece's top division, the Alpha Ethniki. They also competed in the European Cup and the Greek Cup.

Panathinaikos finished second in the league table.

== Squad ==
Note: Flags indicate national team as defined under FIFA eligibility rules; some limited exceptions apply. Players may hold more than one non-FIFA nationality.

No.	Pos.	Nation	Player
—	GK	GRE	Antonis Minou
—	DF	GRE	Kostas Mavridis
—	DF	GRE	Nikos Karoulias
—	DF	GRE	Giannis Vonortas
—	MF	GRE	Kostas Antoniou
—	MF	GRE	Spiros Livathinos
—	MF	GRE	Grigoris Papavasiliou

No.	Pos.	Nation	Player
—	MF	YUG	Velimir Zajec
—	MF	GRE	Dimitris Saravakos (captain)
—	MF	GRE	Giannis Kyrastas
—	MF	ARG	Juan Ramon Rocha
—	FW	GRE	Grigoris Charalampidis
—	FW	GRE	Thanasis Dimopoulos
—	FW	GRE	Maik Galakos

== Competitions ==
=== Alpha Ethniki ===
==== League table ====
Pos	Team	Pld	W	D	L	GF	GA	GD	Pts	Qualification or relegation
1	PAOK (C)	30	19	8	3	54	26	+28	46	Qualification for European Cup first round
2	Panathinaikos	30	17	9	4	61	30	+31	43	Qualification for UEFA Cup first round
3	AEK Athens	30	16	11	3	58	29	+29	43	Qualification for UEFA Cup first round
4	Olympiacos	30	17	8	5	53	23	+30	42	
5	Iraklis	30	19	3	8	59	33	+26	41	

Source: RSSSF
Rules for classification: 1st points; 2nd head-to-head points; 3rd head-to-head goal difference; 4th decision match.
(C) Champions

=== European Cup ===
==== First round ====
19 September 1984 First leg	Feyenoord (Netherlands)	0–0	(Greece) Panathinaikos	Rotterdam, Netherlands
20:00		Report		Stadium: De Kuip; Attendance: 38,542; Referee: Neil Midgley (England)

3 October 1984 Second leg	Panathinaikos (Greece)	2–1 (2–1 agg.)	(Netherlands) Feyenoord	Athens, Greece
20:00	Mavridis 41'; Rocha 43'	Report	Rep 69'	Stadium: Olympic Stadium; Attendance: 73,991; Referee: Vojtech Christov (Czechoslovakia)

==== Second round ====
24 October 1984 First leg	Panathinaikos (Greece)	2–1	(Northern Ireland) Linfield	Athens, Greece
19:00	Charalambidis 42' (pen.); Tarasis 88'	Report	Totten 20'	Stadium: Olympic Stadium; Attendance: 51,985; Referee: Lajos Németh (Hungary)

7 November 1984 Second leg	Linfield (Northern Ireland)	3–3 (4–5 agg.)	(Greece) Panathinaikos	Belfast, Northern Ireland
21:00	McGaughey 6', 26' (pen.); Maxwell 10'	Report	Saravakos 29'; Rocha 33'; Antoniou 63'	Stadium: Windsor Park; Attendance: 7,269; Referee: Peer Frickmann (Denmark)

==== Quarter-finals ====
6 March 1985 First leg	IFK Göteborg (Sweden)	0–1	(Greece) Panathinaikos	Gothenburg, Sweden
19:00		Report	Saravakos 50' (pen.)	Stadium: Ullevi; Attendance: 40,026; Referee: Brian McGinlay (Scotland)

20 March 1985 Second leg	Panathinaikos (Greece)	2–2 (3–2 agg.)	(Sweden) IFK Göteborg	Athens, Greece
19:00	Dimopoulos 44'; Saravakos 78' (pen.)	Report	T. Nilsson 11'; Tord Holmgren 53'	Stadium: Olympic Stadium; Attendance: 74,130; Referee: Volker Roth (West Germany)

==== Semi-finals ====
10 April 1985 First leg	Liverpool (England)	4–0	(Greece) Panathinaikos	Liverpool, England
20:30	Wark 35'; Rush 48', 49'; Beglin 85'	Report		Stadium: Anfield; Attendance: 39,488; Referee: Jan Keizer (Netherlands)

24 April 1985 Second leg	Panathinaikos (Greece)	0–1 (0–5 agg.)	(England) Liverpool	Athens, Greece
20:00		Report	Lawrenson 60'	Stadium: Olympic Stadium; Attendance: 55,539; Referee: Adolf Prokop (East Germany)
