= 1988 Greek Super Cup =

AEL	Panathinaikos
1	3
- Date: 24 August 1988
- Venue: Olympic Stadium, Marousi, Athens
- Referee: Giorgos Koukoulakis (Heraklion)
- Attendance: 30,000

The 1988 Greek Super Cup was the 3rd edition of the Greek Super Cup, an association football match contested by the winners of the previous season's Alpha Ethniki and Greek Cup competitions. The match took place on 24 August 1988 at the Athens Olympic Stadium. The contesting teams were the 1987–88 Alpha Ethniki champions, AEL and the 1987–88 Greek Cup winners, Panathinaikos. Panathinaikos won the match 3–1.

== Venue ==
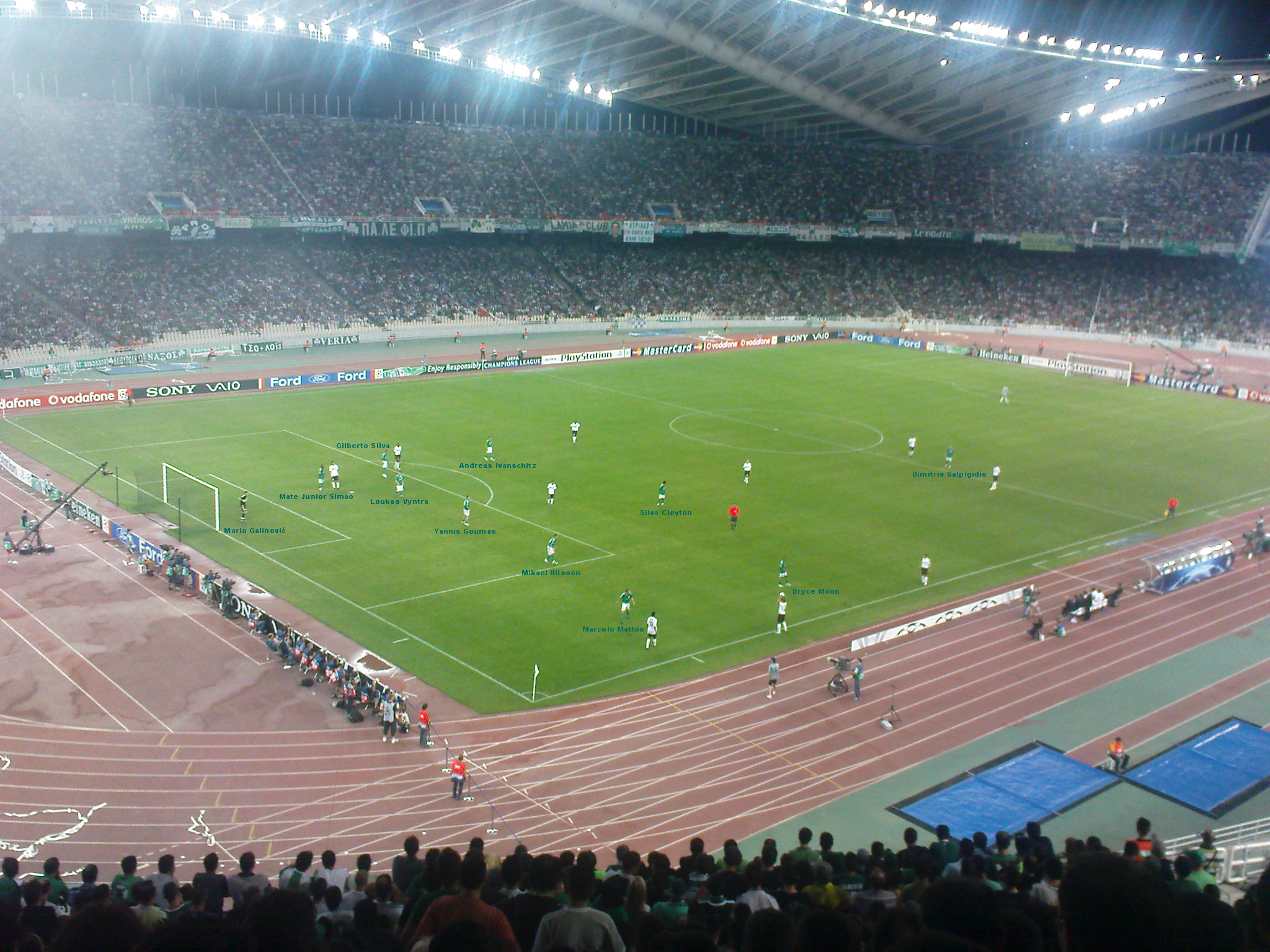
Athens Olympic Stadium.

This was the second Greek Super Cup held at the Athens Olympic Stadium, after 1987.

The Athens Olympic Stadium was built in 1982. The stadium is used as a venue for Panathinaikos, Olympiacos and Greece and was used for AEK Athens in various occasions. Its current capacity is 80,000 and hosted a European Cup final in 1983 and a European Cup Winners' Cup final in 1987.

== Background ==
AEL had never competed in the Greek Super Cup.

Panathinaikos had never competed in the Greek Super Cup.

The two teams had never met each other in the Super Cup.

== Match ==
=== Details ===
24 August 1988
21:00 EEST (UTC+3)

AEL	1–3	Panathinaikos
Mitsibonas 59'	Report	Nielsen 27', 64'; Kalantzis 58'

Olympic Stadium, Marousi
Attendance: 30,000
Referee: Giorgos Koukoulakis (Heraklion)

AEL	Panathinaikos

GK	1	(Greece) Christos Michail
RB	2	(Greece) Georgios Agorogiannis
CB	3	(Greece) Kostas Kolomitrousis
CB	5	(Greece) Lazaros Kyrilidis
LB	4	(Greece) Georgios Mitsibonas
DM	6	(Greece) Sakis Tsiolis		(substituted off) 59'
CM	8	(Greece) Theodoros Voutiritsas (c)
AM	10	(Greece) Vassilis Karapialis	(yellow card) 65'
RW	7	(Greece) Giannis Alexoulis	(yellow card) 77'
LW	11	(Greece) Giannis Valaoras		(substituted off) 66'
CF	9	(Greece) Michalis Ziogas
Substitutes:
GK	15	(Greece) Theodoros Kyriakoulis
DF		(Greece) Vaios Athanasiou		(substituted on) 59'
DF		(Greece) Giannis Galitsios
MF		(Greece) Charalampos Tsiliakos
FW		(Republic of Ireland) Paul Bannon		(substituted on) 66'
Manager:
(Czechoslovakia) Vladimír Táborský

GK	1	(Greece) Giorgos Abadiotakis
RB	2	(Greece) Iakovos Chatziathanasiou
CB	6	(Greece) Kostas Mavridis (c)
CB	5	(Greece) Nikos Kourbanas	(substituted off) 15'
LB	3	(Greece) Nikos Vamvakoulas
DM	8	(Australia) Louis Christodoulou
CM	4	(Greece) Chris Kalantzis	(substituted off) 81'
AM	10	(Bulgaria) Hristo Kolev
RW	7	(Greece) Dimitris Saravakos
LW	11	(Greece) Lysandros Georgamlis
CF	9	(Denmark) Claus Nielsen
Substitutes:
GK	15	(Greece) Nikos Sarganis
DF		(Greece) Christos Vasiliou	(substituted on) 15'
MF		(Greece) Vangelis Vlachos	(substituted on) 81'
FW		(Greece) Christos Dimopoulos
FW		(Greece) Artemis Bouras
Manager:
(Sweden) Gunder Bengtsson

Assistant referees:
Giorgos Ioannidis
Stefanos Louloudakis (Dodecanese)

Match rules

- 90 minutes
- 30 minutes of extra time if necessary
- Penalty shootout if scores still level
- Five named substitutes
- Maximum of two substitutions
