= Gunder Bengtsson =

Swedish football manager (1946–2019)

Personal information
- Date of birth: 2 February 1946
- Place of birth: Torsby, Sweden
- Date of death: 2 August 2019 (aged 73)
- Place of death: Härjedalen, Sweden

Managerial career
- Years: Team
- 1982: IFK Göteborg
- 1983–1984: Vålerenga
- 1984: Marítimo
- 1984: Vålerenga
- 1985–1987: IFK Göteborg
- 1988–1989: Panathinaikos
- 1990–1991: Feyenoord
- 1992–1996: Örgryte IS
- 1996: PAOK
- 1997: Apollon Limassol
- 2001–2003: Molde FK

Gunder Bengtsson (2 February 1946 – 2 August 2019) was a Swedish football coach.

== Career ==
Bengtsson started his career as assistant coach under Sven-Göran Eriksson at IFK Göteborg. In 1982, after Eriksson won the UEFA Cup 1981–82 and left the club for Benfica in late June, Bengtsson became head coach for rest of the season. After that he went to Norwegian club Vålerenga, which he became league champion with in 1983 and 1984.

After a short time contract at Portuguese club Marítimo (February to May 1984), where he failed to take the club back to the top division, and a short return at Vålerenga, he became head coach of IFK Göteborg from 1985 to 1987. In his last year, Göteborg again won the UEFA Cup 1986–87. After this Bengtsson left the club for Panathinaikos, where he worked from 25 January 1988 to 2 November 1989, when he got sacked.

In December 1989 he was appointed head coach of Feyenoord, next to junior coach Pim Verbeek. Feyenoord had made a bad start of the season and was at the bottom of the charts. The stubborn Bengtsson couldn't make any impression in Rotterdam. He tried to get the team together with fine systems and endless conditional trainings, but failed. That year Feyenoord finished 11th. In his second season at Feyenoord, the results again were disappointing. In March 1991 he, and second coach Verbeek, were fired, and replaced by Wim Jansen.

After his stay with Feyenoord, Bengtsson in 1992 became manager for Örgryte IS. In 1996, he became coach for PAOK and Apollon Limassol, for short terms.

In 2001 Bengtsson became coach of the Norwegian Molde. At his appointment he told the press Molde would become the biggest club in Norway in 2005. In May 2003 he was fired after a bad start of the season. When he left the club, he said that he felt there was not enough progression in the club. After this he retired from professional football.

== Honours ==
IFK Göteborg

- Swedish Champion (Note: The title of "Swedish Champions" has been awarded to the winner of four different competitions over the years. Between 1896 and 1925 the title was awarded to the winner of Svenska Mästerskapet, a stand-alone cup tournament. No club were given the title between 1926 and 1930 even though the first-tier league Allsvenskan was played. In 1931 the title was reinstated and awarded to the winner of Allsvenskan. Between 1982 and 1990 a play-off in cup format was held at the end of the league season to decide the champions. After the play-off format in 1991 and 1992 the title was decided by the winner of Mästerskapsserien, an additional league after the end of Allsvenskan. Since the 1993 season the title has once again been awarded to the winner of Allsvenskan.): 1982, 1987
- Allsvenskan: 1982
- UEFA Cup: 1986–87

Vålerenga

- 1. divisjon: 1983, 1984

Panathinaikos

- Greek Cup: 1987–88, 1988–89
- Greek Super Cup: 1988

Örgryte

- Division 2, Mellersta Götaland : 1992
- Division 1 Kvalsvenskan, Västra: 1992
- Allsvenskan qualification play-offs: 1992
- Division 1 Södra: 1994

== See also ==
- List of UEFA Cup and Europa League winning managers
