= 1985–86 Greek Football Cup =

1985–86 Greek Cup
Tournament details
- Country: Greece
- Teams: 76

Final positions
- Champions: Panathinaikos (9th title)
- Runners-up: Olympiacos

Tournament statistics
- Matches played: 105
- Goals scored: 299 (2.85 per match)

The 1985–86 Greek Football Cup was the 44th edition of the Greek Football Cup.

== Tournament details ==
Totally 76 teams participated, 16 from Alpha Ethniki, 20 from Beta, and 40 from Gamma. It was held in 7 rounds, included final. An additional round was held between first and second, with 6 matches, in order that the teams would continue to be 32.

The eternal enemies, Panathinaikos and Olympiacos contested the final after 11 years. Olympiacos had eliminated "big three of Thessaloniki" (PAOK, Aris, and Iraklis), while Panathinaikos only one Alpha Ethniki team, AEK Athens, in semi-finals. In the final, that was held in Olympic Stadium, the common home of all three teams of former P.O.K. that year, Panathinaikos achieved an impressive 4–0 victory against their opponent, completing one successful season with the win of the double.

There were nevertheless many unusual events. Cup holders, AEL, were eliminated by Panseraikos in the first round. Panionios were eliminated by Naoussa, as well. PAOK struggled to qualify against Anagennisi Giannitsa, with score 6–5 in penalty shoot-out. Eventually, a memorable fact took place, as HFF allocated the 1/5 of crude income of the final in favour of the aims of UNICEF.

== Calendar ==
Round	Date(s)	Fixtures	Clubs	New entries
First Round	10, 17, 24 October & 6, 7 November 1985	38	76 → 38	76
Additional Round	21 November 1985	6	38 → 32	none
Round of 32	4, 5, 12, 29, 30 December 1985	32	32 → 16	none
Round of 16	21 January, 12 February 1986	16	16 → 8	none
Quarter-finals	12 March, 9 April 1986	8	8 → 4	none
Semi-finals	11, 19, 21 May 1986	4	4 → 2	none
Final	28 May 1986	1	2 → 1	none

== Knockout phase ==
Each tie in the knockout phase, apart from the first two rounds and the final, was played over two legs, with each team playing one leg at home. The team that scored more goals on aggregate over the two legs advanced to the next round. If the aggregate score was level, the away goals rule was applied, i.e. the team that scored more goals away from home over the two legs advanced. If away goals were also equal, then extra time was played. The away goals rule was again applied after extra time, i.e. if there were goals scored during extra time and the aggregate score was still level, the visiting team advanced by virtue of more away goals scored. If no goals were scored during extra time, the winners were decided by a penalty shoot-out. In the first two rounds and the final, which were played as a single match, if the score was level at the end of normal time, extra time was played, followed by a penalty shoot-out if the score was still level.
The mechanism of the draws for each round is as follows:

- There are no seedings, and teams from the same group can be drawn against each other.

== First round ==
Team 1	Score	Team 2
Lamia	1–0	Apollon Kalamarias
Kastoria	3–0	Ionikos
Odysseas Kordelio	0–1	Kavala
Proodeftiki	0–2	Athinaikos
Anagennisi Giannitsa	1–1 (5–6 p)	PAOK
Eordaikos	2–0	Polykastro
Veria	4–1	Xanthi
Rodos	0–1	Irodotos
Almopos Aridea	4–2 (a.e.t.)	Kilkisiakos
Paniliakos	2–0	Vyzas Megara
Pannafpliakos	1–1 (4–5 p)	Thiva
OFI	1–0	Charavgiakos
Aiolikos	2–1 (a.e.t.)	Panetolikos
Olympiacos	3–1	Pierikos
Chalkida	6–1	Neapoli Piraeus
Atromitos	3–0	Achilleas Farsala
Anagennisi Karditsa	1–0	PAS Giannina
Panthrakikos	1–0	Agrotikos Asteras
Ethnikos Alexandroupoli	3–1	Acharnaikos
Kerkyra	1–2	Doxa Drama
Ethnikos Asteras	1–4	Iraklis
Thriamvos Athens	1–2	Olympiacos Volos
Ergotelis	4–1	Niki Volos
Fostiras	1–2	Trikala
Levadiakos	2–3 (a.e.t.)	Panachaiki
Makedonikos	2–1	Alexandreia
Iraklis Kavala	1–0	Panarkadikos
Agrinio	1–3 (a.e.t.)	Apollon Athens
Edessaikos	2–0	Kalamata
APE Langadas	0–2	Aris
Korinthos	0–2	Ethnikos Piraeus
Panserraikos	1–0	AEL
Kallithea	4–1	Kozani
Naoussa	2–1	Panionios
Anagennisi Arta	2–4	Egaleo
Diagoras	4–1	Panelefsiniakos
Panathinaikos	5–0	Poseidon Michaniona
AEK Athens	10–0	Ilioupoli

== Additional round ==
Team 1	Score	Team 2
Veria	1–2 (a.e.t.)	Doxa Drama
OFI	3–0	Edessaikos
Kastoria	3–0	Naoussa
Olympiacos	0–0 (4–3 p)	PAOK
Trikala	4–0	Atromitos
Makedonikos	3–1	Panthrakikos

== Bracket ==
Round of 32
Chalkida (p)	1	0	1(3)
Iraklis Kavala	0	1	1(0)
AEK Athens	1	1	2
Kallithea	1	0	1
Panachaiki	2	2	4
Diagoras	0	1	1
Egaleo	0	0	0
Kavala	0	1	1
Trikala	0	1	1
Olympiacos Volos	2	0	2
Ergotelis	1	0	1
Panserraikos	0	0	0
Makedonikos	0	2	2
Panathinaikos	2	2	4
Aiolikos	3	3	6
Paniliakos	0	1	1
Irodotos	1	1	2
Anagennisi Karditsa	3	1	4
OFI	2	1	3
Doxa Drama	0	1	1
Aris (a)	0	1	1
Kastoria	0	1	1
Eordaikos	0	2	2
Ethnikos Alexandroupoli	0	1	1
Olympiacos	2	1	3
Lamia	1	0	1
Iraklis	7	1	8
Thiva	0	0	0
Almopos Aridea	0	0	0
Ethnikos Piraeus	3	3	6
Apollon Athens	1	2	3
Athinaikos	1	1	2

Round of 16
Chalkida	1	0	1
AEK Athens	2	2	4
Panachaiki	4	0	4
Kavala	1	1	2
Olympiacos Volos	1	0	1
Ergotelis	0	2	2
Panathinaikos	5	1	6
Aiolikos	2	2	0
Anagennisi Karditsa	1	3	4
OFI	1	5	6
Aris	5	1	6
Eordaikos	1	0	1
Olympiacos	3	0	3
Iraklis	1	1	2
Ethnikos Piraeus (a)	1	1	2
Apollon Athens	0	2	2

Quarter-finals
AEK Athens	3	0	3
Panachaiki	0	1	1
Ergotelis	2	1	3
Panathinaikos	3	7	10
OFI	1	2	3
Aris	1	4	5
Olympiacos	3	1	4
Ethnikos Piraeus	1	0	1

Semi-finals
AEK Athens	2	1	3
Panathinaikos	2	2	4
Aris	1	1	2
Olympiacos	1	2	3

Final
Panathinaikos	4
Olympiacos	0

== Round of 32 ==
Team 1	Agg.	Team 2	1st leg	2nd leg
Panachaiki	4–1	Diagoras	2–0	2–1
Trikala	1–2	Olympiacos Volos	0–2	1–0
Irodotos	2–4	Anagennisi Karditsa	1–3	1–1
AEK Athens	2–1	Kallithea	1–1	1–0
Makedonikos	2–4	Panathinaikos	0–2	2–2
Iraklis	8–0	Thiva	7–0	1–0
Apollon Athens	3–2	Athinaikos	1–1	2–1
OFI	3–1	Doxa Drama	2–0	1–1
Aris	(a) 1–1	Kastoria	0–0	1–1
Egaleo	0–1	Kavala	0–0	0–1
Aiolikos	6–1	Paniliakos	3–0	3–1
Almopos Aridea	0–6	Ethnikos Piraeus	0–3	0–3
Eordaikos	2–1	Ethnikos Alexandroupoli	0–0	2–1
Chalkida	1–1 (3–0 p)	Iraklis Kavala	1–0	0–1
Olympiacos	3–1	Lamia	2–1	1–0
Ergotelis	1–0	Panserraikos	1–0	0–0

== Round of 16 ==
Team 1	Agg.	Team 2	1st leg	2nd leg
Aris	6–1	Eordaikos	5–1	1–0
Ethnikos Piraeus	(a) 2–2	Apollon Athens	1–0	1–2
Anagennisi Karditsa	4–6	OFI	1–1	3–5
Olympiacos Volos	1–2	Ergotelis	1–0	0–2
Olympiacos	3–2	Iraklis	3–1	0–1
Panathinaikos	6–0	Aiolikos	5–0	1–0
Panachaiki	4–2	Kavala	4–1	0–1
Chalkida	1–4	AEK Athens	1–2	0–2

== Quarter-finals ==
Team 1	Agg.	Team 2	1st leg	2nd leg
AEK Athens	3–1	Panachaiki	3–0	0–1
OFI	3–5	Aris	1–1	2–4
Ergotelis	3–10	Panathinaikos	2–3	1–7
Olympiacos	4–1	Ethnikos Piraeus	3–1	1–0

== Semi-finals ==
Team 1	Agg.	Team 2	1st leg	2nd leg
Aris	2–3	Olympiacos	1–1	1–2
AEK Athens	3–4	Panathinaikos	2–2	1–2

== Final ==
28 May 1986
21:00 EEST

Panathinaikos	4–0	Olympiacos
Vlachos 24'; Dimopoulos 52'; Saravakos 57', 72'	Report

Olympic Stadium, Marousi
Attendance: 72,948
Referee: Kostas Dimitriadis (Piraeus)
