= List of football clubs in Greece by major honours won =

This is a list of the major honours won by football clubs in Greece. It lists every club to have won any of the domestic and international trophies.

== Honours table ==
	Club	Domestic				International		Total	Last trophy
	Club	League	Cup	Super Cup	League Cup	UEFA Conference League	Balkans Cup	Total	Last trophy
1	Olympiacos	48	29	5	0	1	1	84	2025 Super Cup
2	Panathinaikos	20	20	3	0	0	1	44	2024 Cup
3	AEK Athens	14	16	2	1	0	0	33	2026 League
4	PAOK	4	8	0	0	0	0	12	2024 League
5	OFI	0	2	1	0	0	1	4	2026 Super Cup
6	Aris	3	1	0	0	0	0	4	1970 Cup
7	AEL	1	2	0	0	0	0	3	2007 Cup
8	Panionios	0	2	0	0	0	1	3	1998 Cup
9	Iraklis	0	1	0	0	0	1	2	1985 Balkans Cup
10	Edessaikos	0	0	0	0	0	1	1	1993 Balkans Cup
11	Kastoria	0	1	0	0	0	0	1	1980 Cup
12	Ethnikos	0	1	0	0	0	0	1	1933 Cup

== See also ==
- Football records and statistics in Greece
- List of football clubs by competitive honours won

== Sources ==
- Rec.Sport.Soccer Statistics Foundation
