= 1987–88 Greek Football Cup =

1987–88 Greek Cup
Tournament details
- Country: Greece
- Teams: 70

Final positions
- Champions: Panathinaikos (10th title)
- Runners-up: Olympiacos

Tournament statistics
- Matches played: 99
- Goals scored: 287 (2.9 per match)
- Top goal scorer(s): Dimitris Saravakos (10 goals)

The 1987–88 Greek Football Cup was the 46th edition of the Greek Football Cup.

== Tournament details ==
Totally 70 teams participated, 16 from Alpha Ethniki, 18 from Beta, and 36 from Gamma. It was held in 7 rounds, included final. An additional round was held between first and second, with 3 matches, in order that the teams would continue to be 32.

It was an enough eventful year, that was marked by hard confrontations in the cases of "strong" pairs. In third round, Olympiacos eliminated AEK Athens with 1–1 draw at home and 3–1 win away, in a much debated match (there were allegations for some of AEK's players being bribed to have low performance). In semi-finals, Olympiacos eliminated cup winners, OFI, and Panathinaikos the champions of the season, AEL.

The final between the eternal enemies was an opportunity for a good season ending with a title, as both teams were struggling in the championship. The match was nervous, however kept effervescent interesting until the end, since it was judged on the penalty shoot-out, after a 2–2 draw (3 out of 4 goals was scored by penalties). Nikos Sarganis was the hero of the match, saving two penalties and scoring one in the process. For Olympiacos it was the third time that they lost a cup final on penalty shoot-out (the other two in 1974 and 1976). Dimitris Saravakos with 10 goals was the top scorer.

== Calendar ==
Round	Date(s)	Fixtures	Clubs	New entries
First Round	25 October 1987	35	70 → 35	70
Additional Round	1987	3	35 → 32	none
Round of 32	30 December 1987 & 13 January 1988	32	32 → 16	none
Round of 16	27 January, 10 February 1988	16	16 → 8	none
Quarter-finals	24 February, 9 March 1988	8	8 → 4	none
Semi-finals	30 March, 20 April 1988	4	4 → 2	none
Final	8 May 1988	1	2 → 1	none

== Knockout phase ==
Each tie in the knockout phase, apart from the first two rounds and the final, was played over two legs, with each team playing one leg at home. The team that scored more goals on aggregate over the two legs advanced to the next round. If the aggregate score was level, the away goals rule was applied, i.e. the team that scored more goals away from home over the two legs advanced. If away goals were also equal, then extra time was played. The away goals rule was again applied after extra time, i.e. if there were goals scored during extra time and the aggregate score was still level, the visiting team advanced by virtue of more away goals scored. If no goals were scored during extra time, the winners were decided by a penalty shoot-out. In the first two rounds and the final, which were played as a single match, if the score was level at the end of normal time, extra time was played, followed by a penalty shoot-out if the score was still level.
The mechanism of the draws for each round is as follows:

- There are no seedings, and teams from the same group can be drawn against each other.

== First round ==
Team 1	Score	Team 2
Apollon Kalamarias	2–0	Panargiakos
Korinthos	3–0	Proodeftiki
Olympiacos Volos	3–1	Apollon Athens
Levadiakos	3–0	Lamia
Panserraikos	3–1	Edessaikos
Makedonikos	1–1 (4–5 p)	Charavgiakos
Doxa Drama	7–1	Athinaikos
Ethnikos Piraeus	3–4	Anagennisi Karditsa
Panathinaikos	2–0	Chalkida
Trikala	2–1	Acharnaikos
Kerkyra	1–0	Panachaiki
Aris Nikaia	1–1 (5–6 p)	Ethnikos Asteras
AEK Athens	3–1	Iraklis
Aiolikos	0–4	Kastoria
AEL	3–0	Veria
Kavala	2–1	Rodos
Polykastro	1–2	PAS Giannina
Pannafpliakos	1–0 (a.e.t.)	Naoussa
Panetolikos	4–0	Messiniakos
Anagennisi Neapoli	0–0 (5–4 p)	Eordaikos
Anagennisi Arta	0–1	PAOK
Irodotos	3–1	Ionikos
Egaleo	1–1 (6–5 p)	Alexandreia
Kallithea	3–1	Kalamata
Olympiacos	4–0	Agrotikos Asteras
Pierikos	3–1	EAR
OFI	4–0	Nestos Chrysoupoli
Panelefsiniakos	1–1 (4–5 p)	Pandramaikos
Panionios	2–4	Xanthi
Aris	4–0	Ergotelis
Niki Volos	1–3	Diagoras
Kozani	4–1	Olympiakos Chalkida
Atromitos	4–2	Anagennisi Kolindros
Achaiki	1–0 (a.e.t.)	Kilkisiakos
Panarkadikos	3–1	Ethnikos Alexandroupoli

== Additional round ==
Team 1	Score	Team 2
Panetolikos	0–2	Diagoras
Pandramaikos	0–0 (4–3 p)	Atromitos
Panathinaikos	7–2	Kavala

== Bracket ==
Round of 32
Kozani	1	0	1
Doxa Drama	2	1	3
Apollon Kalamarias	2	2	4
Anagennisi Karditsa	0	2	2
Olympiacos Volos	0	0	0
Olympiacos	1	5	6
Kallithea	3	0	3
AEK Athens	2	2	4
Egaleo	1	2	3
Ethnikos Asteras	1	0	1
OFI (a)	0	2	2
Levadiakos	0	2	2
Trikala	2	0	2
Pannafpliakos	0	1	1
Kerkyra	0	0	0
Panarkadikos	0	1	1
Anagennisi Neapoli	1	0	1
Irodotos	0	2	2
Charavgiakos	0	0	0
Diagoras	0	1	1
PAS Giannina	1	2	3
Pandramaikos	0	1	1
Panserraikos	0	0	0
Panathinaikos	0	2	2
Aris (a.e.t.)	1	3	4
Korinthos	0	2	2
Pierikos	2	1	3
AEL	3	3	6
PAOK	2	1	3
Kastoria	1	3	4
Xanthi	4	3	7
Achaiki	0	1	1

Round of 16
Doxa Drama	2	0	2
Apollon Kalamarias	1	2	3
Olympiacos	1	3	4
AEK Athens	1	1	2
Egaleo	0	0	0
OFI	0	7	7
Trikala	2	0	2
Panarkadikos	0	1	1
Irodotos	2	3	5
Diagoras	2	2	4
PAS Giannina	1	2	3
Panathinaikos	2	8	10
Aris	2	0	2
AEL (a)	1	1	2
Kastoria	3	1	4
Xanthi	2	1	3

Quarter-finals
Apollon Kalamarias	0	1	1
Olympiacos	0	2	2
OFI	3	1	4
Trikala	2	0	2
Irodotos	0	0	0
Panathinaikos	4	2	6
AEL	1	0	1
Kastoria	0	0	0

Semi-finals
Olympiacos	3	0	3
OFI	0	1	1
Panathinaikos	1	3	4
AEL	0	1	1

Final
Olympiacos	2(3)
Panathinaikos (p)	2(4)

== Round of 32 ==
Team 1	Agg.	Team 2	1st leg	2nd leg
Egaleo	3–1	Ethnikos Asteras	1–1	2–0
Pierikos	3–6	AEL	2–3	1–3
Xanthi	7–1	Achaiki	4–0	3–1
Apollon Kalamarias	4–2	Anagennisi Karditsa	2–0	2–2
Charavgiakos	0–1	Diagoras	0–0	0–1
Kallithea	3–4	AEK Athens	3–2	0–2
PAS Giannina	3–1	Pandramaikos	1–0	2–1
Olympiacos Volos	0–6	Olympiacos	0–1	0–5
Aris	4–2	Korinthos	1–0	3–2 (a.e.t.)
Kozani	1–3	Doxa Drama	1–2	0–1
Trikala	2–1	Pannafpliakos	2–0	0–1
OFI	(a) 2–2	Levadiakos	0–0	2–2
Anagennisi Neapoli	1–2	Irodotos	1–0	0–2
PAOK	3–4	Kastoria	2–1	1–3
Panserraikos	0–2	Panathinaikos	0–0	0–2
Kerkyra	0–1	Panarkadikos	0–0	0–1

== Round of 16 ==
Team 1	Agg.	Team 2	1st leg	2nd leg
Olympiacos	4–2	AEK Athens	1–1	3–1
Aris	2–2 (a)	AEL	2–1	0–1
Doxa Drama	2–3	Apollon Kalamarias	2–1	0–2
Egaleo	0–7	OFI	0–0	0–7
Irodotos	5–4	Diagoras	2–2	3–2
PAS Giannina	3–10	Panathinaikos	1–2	2–8
Trikala	2–1	Panarkadikos	2–0	0–1
Kastoria	4–3	Xanthi	3–2	1–1

== Quarter-finals ==
Team 1	Agg.	Team 2	1st leg	2nd leg
Apollon Kalamarias	1–2	Olympiacos	0–0	1–2
OFI	4–2	Trikala	3–2	1–0
Irodotos	0–6	Panathinaikos	0–4	0–2
AEL	1–0	Kastoria	1–0	0–0

== Semi-finals ==
Team 1	Agg.	Team 2	1st leg	2nd leg
Panathinaikos	4–1	AEL	1–0	3–1
Olympiacos	3–1	OFI	3–0	0–1

== Final ==
8 May 1988
20:30 EEST

Olympiacos	2–2 (a.e.t.)	Panathinaikos
Funes 59' (pen.), 98' (pen.)	Report	Saravakos 31' (pen.); Dimopoulos 102'
Penalties
Alexiou (penalty scored); Baniotis (penalty scored); Hantzidis (penalty missed); Apostolakis (penalty scored); Funes (penalty missed)	3–4	(penalty scored) Vlachos; (penalty scored) Sarganis; (penalty scored) Dimopoulos; (penalty scored) Georgamlis

Olympic Stadium, Marousi
Attendance: 73,375
Referee: Meletis Voutsaras (Athens)
