= Dimitris Saravakos =

Greek footballer (born 1961)

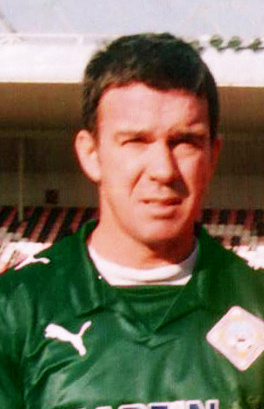
- Dimitris Saravakos in 2009

Personal information
- Full name: Dimitrios Saravakos
- Date of birth: 26 July 1961 (age 65)
- Place of birth: Athens, Greece
- Height: 1.72 m (5 ft 7 1/2 in)
- Positions: Winger; attacking midfielder

Team information
- Current team: Panathinaikos (Strategic Advisor)

Youth career
- 1976–1977: Panionios

Senior career*
Years	Team	Apps	(Gls)
1977–1984	Panionios	132	(35)
1984–1994	Panathinaikos	252	(125)
1994–1996	AEK Athens	47	(21)
1997–1998	Panathinaikos	2	(0)
Total		433	(181)

International career
1982–1994	Greece	78	(22)
- * Club domestic league appearances and goals

Dimitris Saravakos (Greek: Δημήτρης Σαραβάκος; born 26 July 1961), nicknamed "the Kid" (Greek: "ο Μικρός"), is a Greek former professional footballer who played as a forward. Saravakos is widely considered to be one of the greatest Greek footballers of all time and a Panathinaikos legend. The IFFHS chose him in the best XI of all time of Greek football in 2021.

== Club career ==
=== Panionios ===
Saravakos started his professional career at Panionios where, at the age of 16, on 26 December 1977, he made his debut in the championship against Egaleo. In his second season at Panionios, he won the Greek Cup in 1979 defeating the then champion, AEK Athens by 3–1. During the 1981–82 season, Saravakos had the most productive year in the club as he scored 13 goals in the league, while his performances also made him an international. In his last year with Panionios he scored 10 goals in 28 appearances. On May 19, 1984, Panionios played a barrage match for their stay in the division against PAS Giannina, which was decided at the extra time with Saravakos scoring in the 104th minute and giving the lead to Panionios who prevailed by 2–0. In total, he played in Panionios for seven years, recording 132 appearances and 35 goals in the league.

=== Panathinaikos ===
On 22 June 1984, Saravakos was transferred to Panathinaikos for 60 million drachmas. In addition to Saravakos, he also acquired Velimir Zajec and the addition of the latter in combination with the presence of Juan Ramon Rocha, made the midfield of the team particularly creative, thus the attacking virtues of Saravakos were fully exploited. During his first year at Panathinaikos, he was the second top scorer in the league. He scored his first goal for Panathinaikos on September 23, 1984, against OFI. On 25 November 1984 he scored his first goal in Athenian derby against AEK in a 3–2 win. On 20 February 1985 he also scored in the derby of the eternal enemies against Olympiacos in a 2–1 for the Cup. In the European Cup his presence was decisive for the qualification of Panathinaikos to the semi-finals of the institution. Panathinaikos, having qualified against Feyenoord, faced Linfield and in the rematch found themselves losing in Ireland by 3–0. Saravakos' goal started the counterattack that led to the equalizer and the qualification. In the next round, Saravakos creating an excellent attacking duo with Thanasis Dimopoulos, scored against Göteborg in Gamla Ullevi giving Panathinaikos the victory. In the second leg, his goal at the 78th minute, equalized at 2–2, leading his team to the semi-finals of the competition.

In the following season Saravakos won the domestic double. In the Cup he scored in the semi-final against AEK the goal that sent the "greens" to the final. There, he scored 2 goals in the imposing 4–0 win over Olympiacos, which is also the biggest victory in a final of eternal enemies. In the UEFA Cup, his two goals in each leg, against Torino were not enough to qualify them for the next round.

On 3 May 1987, he scored his fastest goal in a derby, in the first minute of the match against AEK which ended 0–3. In the European Cup, the "greens" were close to a big comeback against Red Star, when with goals from Saravakos and Dimopoulos, found themselves winning in the rematch with 2–0, one goal away from the tie of the first match.

On 8 November 1987, he scored in a 1–4 win against Olympiacos. In the UEFA Cup by scoring against Auxerre, he secured Panathinaikos' qualification to the second leg. In the first match of the next round, he scored a goal with an excellent shot outside the area, and gave Panathinaikos a 1–0 victory against Juventus. On the rematch he opened the score and led the club to the next round. In fact, the big Italian team after their elimination showed interest in acquiring him, without proceeding with a proposal. In the next round, Panathinaikos found themselves losing with 5–0 by Honvéd in Hungary. Saravakos did not give up the effort and reduced it to 5–2 with 2 goals, resulting in Panathinaikos winning 5–1 in the second leg and qualifying. In the quarter-finals his goal against Club Brugge was not enough for them to qualify. In the Cup, Saravakos scored three goals in total on both legs against the then champion, AEL and the "greens" qualified to the final. Facing Olympiacos again, the duo of Saravakos-Dimopoulos was successful again as with their 2 goals, Panathinaikos claimed the title on penalties, where they won 4–3.

In June 1988 the then president of Olympiacos, George Koskotas, offered Saravakos the "unrealistic" amount for the Greek data of 600 million drachmas, but failed to dress the athlete in the red and white shirt. On 24 August 1988 he won the Super Cup against AEL winning 3–1. At the end of the season, Panathinaikos emerged as the Cup winner again with Saravakos, scoring a goal in the final against Panionios.

In the summer of 1989, Panathinaikos acquired the striker Krzysztof Warzycha, who connected perfectly with Saravakos and the two of them led the club to the championship in 1990. On February 25, 1990, Saravakos played for the third time in his career in a match where Panathinaikos scored 4 goals against Olympiacos, winning 3–4 in the Karaiskakis Stadium, with him as the captain. In the semi-final of the Greek Cup, Saravakos scored a hat trick against Olympiacos, but the final score of 3–3 was not enough to overturn the 2–1 score of the first match. In the Cup Winners' Cup he scored a goal in Panathinaikos' 3–2 win over Swansea.

The next season, Saravakos emerged as the league's top scorer with 23 goals. Panathinaikos won another double by finishing first, while they were also crowned Cup winners with 10 goals by Saravakos.

The season 1991–92 was the most prolific in goals in the league for Saravakos who scored 24 goals. On 26 January 1992, he scored in a 3–0 victory over Olympiacos. On 9 February 1992, with his 2 goals in 2 minutes, Panathinaikos prevailed 2–0 over AEK. In the quarter-finals of the Cup, Saravakos' goal gave Panathinaikos a qualifying score over Olympiacos, until the 90th minute, when they were equalized and eliminated on away goals. In Europe, Saravakos led Panathinaikos to the groups of the first edition of the Champions League. In the qualifying matches against Göteborg, he scored 3 of Panathinaikos' 4 goals. The first match ended in favor of Panathinaikos 2–0 with Saravakos opening the score. In the rematch, the Swedish were leading 2–0, equaling the result of the first match, but with 2 goals, Saravakos tied at 2-2 and led Panathinaikos to the quarter-finals. An important moment for Saravakos was his participation in World XI alongside Stratos Apostolakis in 1992 in a protest match due to the invasion of Kuwait.

In the 1992–93 season, Saravakos won the Cup with Panathinaikos, while participating in the European competitions, where the "greens" set a goal record, both in one match and in the total of the 2 matches against Electroputere Craiova with 10 goals with him scoring once. On August 18 of 1993 he scored the decider against AEK for the Super Cup.

In the 1993–94 season, he won for the 6th time in his career the Cup. On 2 November 1993, Saravakos played for the last time in his career with Panathinaikos in a European competition in the away victory against Bayer Leverkusen with 1–2, opening the scoring in the 6th minute.

=== AEK Athens ===
In the summer of 1994, since his contract was not renewed, Saravakos left Panathinaikos and joined their rivals, AEK Athens. On 10 August 1994, he played in his first official match with AEK, which was one of the most memorable with their shirt against Rangers securing the qualification to the Champions League group stage for the first time in their history. Saravakos with his 2 goals in the first match, gave the victory to AEK, which prevailed in the rematch. His presence in the league was equally satisfactory as he emerged as the second scorer with 21 goals. On 1 April 1995 he scored for the last time in the derby against Olympiacos. At the end of the season they lost the Cup in final against Panathinaikos, where he lost a crucial penalty.

In the following season with the "yellow-blacks", he won his third another Super Cup against his former club. On 3 December 1995 he scored his last goal for the yellow-blacks with a direct corner kick in a 4–0 against OFI. His advanced age and the injuries he was facing had a result not to offer much at the club. AEK displayed impressive football and won the Cup but finished second in the league. At the end of the year, AEK, respecting his contribution to the club, released him by terminating his contract by mutual consent.

=== Retirement ===
In the summer of 1997 after a year of absence from football Saravakos returned to Panathinaikos to end his career in his favorite club. He competed in just 2 league matches before retiring in the summer of 1998.

He is the leading scorer in history with 16 goals in the Derby of the eternal enemies. He held the record for the Greek top scorer in UEFA competitions, with 25 goals, but he was surpassed by Demis Nikolaidis.

== International career ==
Saravakos was a key member of Greece, with whom he competed between 1982 and 1994. He is fourth top scorer in the history of the national team with 22 goals in 78 appearances. He was part of the team that claimed qualification for the UEFA Euro 1988 and contributed to the great success of qualifying for the 1994 FIFA World Cup in the United States.

He also played for the Mediterranean team in the 1983 Mediterranean Games in Casablanca, Morocco, where on 11/9/83 he scored the team's second goal in a 2–1 against Libya. In 1983 he participated in 4 matches with the Olympic team.

== Style of play ==
Saravakos was one of the most popular and charismatic players of Greek football. He possessed excellent technical training and footballing intelligence, with a strong emphasis on finishing, game development and a keen ability to score goals, being regarded as one of the most effective takers in all foul and penalty kicks.

== After football ==
Since 2013 he serves as Strategic Adviser for Panathinaikos a position created especially for him.

== Personal life ==
His father Thanasis was also an international footballer of Panionios.

== Honours ==
Panionios

- Greek Cup: 1978–79

Panathinaikos

- Alpha Ethniki: 1985–86, 1989–90, 1990–91
- Greek Cup: 1985–86, 1987–88, 1988–89, 1990–91, 1992–93, 1993–94
- Greek Super Cup: 1988, 1993

AEK Athens

- Greek Cup: 1995–96

== Statistics ==
Club	Season	League			Cup		Super Cup		League Cup		Europe		Total	
Club	Season	Division	Apps	Goals	Apps	Goals	Apps	Goals	Apps	Goals	Apps	Goals	Apps	Goals!
Panionios	1977–78	Alpha Ethniki	1	0	?	0	—	—	—	—	—	—	1+	0
Panionios	1978–79	Alpha Ethniki	9	0	1	0	—	—	—	—	—	—	10	0
Panionios	1979–80	Alpha Ethniki	12	0	0	0	—	—	—	—	—	—	12	0
Panionios	1980–81	Alpha Ethniki	33	4	3	2	—	—	—	—	—	—	36	6
Panionios	1981–82	Alpha Ethniki	31	13	?	0	—	—	—	—	—	—	31+	13
Panionios	1982–83	Alpha Ethniki	28	8	2	0	—	—	—	—	—	—	30	8
Panionios	1983–84	Alpha Ethniki	28	10	8	5	—	—	—	—	—	—	36	15
Panionios	Total		142	35	14+	7	0	0	0	0	0	0	156+	42
Panathinaikos	1984–85	Alpha Ethniki	23	15	?	1	—	—	—	—	8	3	31+	19
Panathinaikos	1985–86	Alpha Ethniki	29	15	?	5	—	—	—	—	2	2	31+	22
Panathinaikos	1986–87	Alpha Ethniki	23	13	?	4	—	—	—	—	2	1	25+	18
Panathinaikos	1987–88	Alpha Ethniki	26	5	?	9	1	0	—	—	8	6	35+	20
Panathinaikos	1988–89	Alpha Ethniki	25	5	?	7	—	—	—	—	2	0	27+	12
Panathinaikos	1989–90	Alpha Ethniki	24	11	?	8	—	—	4	3	3	3	31+	25
Panathinaikos	1990–91	Alpha Ethniki	30	23	?	10	—	—	—	—	2	1	32+	34
Panathinaikos	1991–92	Alpha Ethniki	33	24	?	3	—	—	—	—	10	3	43+	30
Panathinaikos	1992–93	Alpha Ethniki	14	2	?	2	1	1	—	—	2	1	17+	6
Panathinaikos	1993–94	Alpha Ethniki	25	15	?	0	—	—	—	—	4	3	29+	18
Panathinaikos	Total		252	125	?	49	2	1	4	3	43	23	299+	201
AEK Athens	1994–95	Alpha Ethniki	30	21	10	3	—	—	—	—	8	2	48	26
AEK Athens	1995–96	Alpha Ethniki	17	-	7	4	—	—	—	—	3	0	27	5
AEK Athens	Total		47	22	17	7	0	0	0	0	11	2	75	31
Panathinaikos	1997–98	Alpha Ethniki	2	0	?	0	0	0	0	0	0	0	2+	0
Career Total			443	185	31+	63	2	1	4	3	54	25	534+	277

Last updated: 2022-07-19
Source: Dimitris Saravakos at National-Football-Teams.com
