= Chris Kalantzis =

Australian soccer player

Personal information
- Full name: Christos Kalantzis
- Date of birth: 27 July 1967 (age 59)
- Place of birth: Sydney, Australia
- Height: 1.84 m (6 ft 0 in)
- Position: Midfielder

Senior career*
Years	Team	Apps	(Gls)
1983–1987	Sydney Olympic	94	(28)
1987–1992	Panathinaikos	118	(11)
1992–1997	Olympiacos	81	(7)
1997–2000	Sydney Olympic	56	(12)

International career
1985	Australia B	2	(0)
1986–1987	Australia	7	(0)
- * Club domestic league appearances and goals

Christos "Chris" Kalantzis (Greek: Χρήστος "Κρις" Καλαντζής; born 27 July 1967) is an Australian former soccer player who played at the highest level of domestic football in Greece and Australia. He played at international level for Australia.

== Playing career ==
=== Club career ===
Born in Sydney to Greek immigrants. His father came from the village of Loukas in Arcadia region of the Peloponnese, Greece and his mother came from the village of Managouli in Aetolia-Acarnania, Greece, he began his career with Sydney Olympic, First Grade, at the age of 15. He was then signed by the Greek team Panathinaikos, where he played for five years. Olympiacos, a rival Greek club, then signed him. On his debut against his former team he scored with his famous bicycle kick from outside the box.

He played for Olympiacos another five years before returning to Sydney Olympic to finish his career, playing two years before retiring.

=== International career ===
Kalantzis played seven matches in full international matches for Australia.

== Post-football career ==
In February 2011, Olympiacos announced the establishment of its first Olympiacos Academy outside of Greece in Sydney, Australia. The Australian academy is managed by Kalantzis and Kyriakos Tohouroglou, both former Olympiacos players.

== Honours ==
- National Soccer League Cup Winners: 1983, 1985
- Alpha Ethniki: 1989–90, 1990–91, 1996–97
- Greek Cup: 1988, 1989, 1991
- Greek Super Cup: 1988
