= Christos Vasiliou =

Greek footballer (born 1961)

Personal information
- Date of birth: 18 August 1961 (age 65)
- Place of birth: Agrinio, Greece
- Position: Defender

Senior career*
Years	Team	Apps	(Gls)
–1983	Panetolikos		
1983–1988	Panathinaikos	31	(0)
1985–1987	→ OFI (loan)	55	(1)
1988–1989	Apollon Smyrnis	16	(2)
1989–1990	Olympiacos Volos	8	(0)
1990–1992	EAR		
1992–1993	Zakynthos		

International career
1986	Greece	1	(0)

Managerial career
- 2001: Panetolikos
- 2009: Platanias
- 2016–2017: Episkopi
- * Club domestic league appearances and goals

Christos Vasiliou (Greek: Xρήστος Bασιλείου; born 18 August 1961) is a retired Greek international football defender and later manager of football clubs in Greece such as Panetolikos, Plantanias and Episkopi.

== Links ==
Christos Vasiliou at National-Football-Teams.com

- Christos Vasiliou at EU-Football.info
