= Kostas Antoniou =

Greek footballer (born 1962)

Personal information
- Full name: Konstantinos Antoniou
- Date of birth: 19 April 1962 (age 64)
- Place of birth: Athens, Greece
- Height: 1.84 m (6 ft 0 in)
- Position: Midfielder

Senior career*
| Years | Team | Apps | (Gls) |
| 1977–1981 | Panathinaikos | 39 | (2) |
| 1981–1983 | Apollon Athens | 53 | (6) |
| 1983–1994 | Panathinaikos | 281 | (47) |
| 1994–1995 | Athinaikos | 12 | (0) |

International career
| 1984–1993 | Greece | 35 | (2) |
- * Club domestic league appearances and goals

Kostas Antoniou (Greek: Κώστας Αντωνίου; born 19 April 1962) is a former Greek international footballer, playing as a midfielder.

== Career ==
Born in Athens, Antoniou started his career at Panathinaikos during the late 1970s. He was recognized for his offensive talent as well. While playing for Panathinaikos he won four Championships (1984, 1986, 1990, and 1991) and three Cups (1984, 1986, and 1989). In 1988, he agreed to join Olympiacos for the sum of 24 million drachma. He accepted, but the Panathinaikos president launched legal action and won an appeal for Antoniou to return. Antoniou stated in an interview: "I'm not going to return to Panathinaikos -not even dead". Antoniou then spent six months in the stands before he was able to play again. In the winter of 1994 he moved to Athinaikos, where he ended his playing career.

In May 2008, Antoniou returned to his favorite club, this time as a Director of Football. In June 2010, after the resignation of Panathinaikos' President Nicolas Pateras, Antoniou also resigned.

Antoniou made 35 appearances and scored 3 goals for the Greece national football team from 1984 to 1993.

== Honours ==
Panathinaikos

- Alpha Ethniki: 1983-84, 1985–86, 1989–90, 1990–91
- Greek Cup: 1983-84, 1985–86, 1987–88, 1988–89, 1990–91, 1992–93, 1993-94
- Greek Super Cup: 1988, 1993
