= Vangelis Vlachos =

Greek footballer and manager (born 1962)

Personal information
- Full name: Evangelos Vlachos
- Date of birth: 6 January 1962 (age 64)
- Place of birth: Nea Artaki, Euboea, Greece
- Height: 1.82 m (6 ft 0 in)
- Position: Midfielder

Youth career
- 1975–1978: AO Nea Artaki
- 1978–1979: AEK Athens

Senior career*
Years	Team	Apps	(Gls)
1979–1985	AEK Athens	134	(28)
1985–1991	Panathinaikos	92	(21)
1991–1992	Korinthos	8	(1)
Total		234	(50)

International career
–1982	Greece U19		
1982–1987	Greece	4	(0)

Managerial career
- 1993–1994: AO Vouliagmeni
- 1994–1995: Panathinaikos U20
- 1995–1999: Panathinaikos (assistant)
- 1999: Kavala
- 1999–2000: Skoda Xanthi
- 2000–2001: Panachaiki
- 2001–2002: Apollon Kalamarias
- 2002: Fostiras
- 2002–2003: Kallithea
- 2003–2005: Ionikos
- 2005–2006: OFI
- 2006: Panionios
- 2009–2011: Asteras Tripolis
- 2012: AEK Athens
- 2015: AEL Kalloni
- 2022–2024: A.E. Mykonos
- * Club domestic league appearances and goals

Vangelis Vlachos (Greek: Βαγγέλης Βλάχος; born 6 January 1962) is a Greek former professional footballer who played as a midfielder and a current manager.

== Club career ==
Vlachos started his career in 1973 at AO Nea Artaki. In 1978 after the indication of Giorgos Kefalidis he joined the academies of AEK Athens, where he played alongside Stelios Manolas and Lysandros Georgamlis. In the summer of 1979 he was promoted to the first team and signed a professional contract with the club. On 26 December 1979, at the age of 17 years and 242 days, he became the then youngest scorer of AEK in the league when he scored 2 goals in a match against Kavala. He formed an excellent partnership with Thomas Mavros, while they were also friends off-field. From 1982 he became the club's captain. Vlachos had a big part in winning the Cup in 1983, scoring a very beautiful goal with an individual effort in the final against PAOK. He became at that time the youngest team captain to lift the Greek Cup.

In 1985, Vlachos despite having a contract with AEK, he had an offer from Yiorgos Vardinogiannis to sign for Panathinaikos, which he accepted. At 26 April 1985, he filed an appeal to EEODEP, asking for debts from AEK and making use of his five-year term, asked to be released from the club so he could play for Panathinaikos. It was the beginning of a court series that lasted several months, which resulted in Vlachos playing for Panathinaikos, but after his contract with AEK expired in December 1985. He remained at Panathinaikos until 1991, where he won three championships, four Cups and one Super Cup. He then played for one season at Korinthos, where he ended his professional career relatively early, in 1992.

== International career ==
Vlachos also competed 4 times with Greece from 1982 to 1987.

== Managerial career ==
Vlachos started his managerial career from AE Vouliagmeni in 1993. In 1994 he was the manager of Panathinaikos U20, where he was promoted the following season as the assistant manager of the senior team. In 1999 he coached Kavala until December and then Skoda Xanthi, where he remained for a season. In 2000 he took charge as manager of Panachaiki and in 2001 of Apollo Kalamarias. In 2002 he had a brief spell at Fostiras and in the same season he continued in Kallithea. In 2003 he took over Ionikos, from which he left in 2005, to continue in OFI, while in 2006 he had a short spell at Panionios and after the end of his term there, he retired for three years due to family obligations.

He returned to coaching in October 2009 with Asteras Tripolis, where he remained until the middle of January 2011. After one and a half season, he took over the financially ruined AEK Athens in 2012, with Mavros as president in an effort to keep the club in the division. He was sacked after four months at the club.

In January 2015, he was announced by AEL Kalloni, where he stayed for a brief period. From 2022 to 2024 he was hired by A.E. Mykonos.

== Honours ==
AEK Athens

- Greek Cup: 1982–83

Panathinaikos

- Alpha Ethniki: 1985–86, 1989–90, 1990–91
- Greek Cup: 1985–86, 1987–88, 1985–89, 1990–91
- Greek Super Cup: 1988
