= Kostas Mavridis =

Greek footballer

Personal information
- Full name: Konstantinos Mavridis
- Date of birth: 7 July 1962 (age 64)
- Place of birth: Tashkent, Uzbekistan, USSR
- Height: 1.88 m (6 ft 2 in)
- Positions: Defender; forward

Youth career
- -1981: Athinaikos

Senior career*
| Years | Team | Apps | (Gls) |
| 1981–1982 | Athinaikos | | |
| 1982–1995 | Panathinaikos | 343 | (41) |
| 1995–1996 | Apollon Smyrnis | 12 | (1) |
| Total | | 355 | (42) |

International career
| 1985–1989 | Greece | 30 | (1) |

Managerial career
- 1998–1999: Athinaikos
- 1999–2000: A.O. Agios Nikolaos F.C.
- 2001–2002: Atromitos F.C.
- 2002–2003: Athinaikos
- * Club domestic league appearances and goals

Konstantinos "Kostas" Mavridis (Greek: Κώστας Μαυρίδης; born 7 July 1962) is a former Greek international footballer.

== Career ==
Mavridis started his career from Athinaikos and he played with his club in amateur leagues until 1982. Mavridis was transferred to Panathiakos in 1982.Until 1985 he was playing as a forward. His coach Jacek Gmoch moved him to the defence in a game against Liverpool for the semifinals for 1984–85 European Cup.

== Honours ==
Panathinaikos

- Alpha Ethniki: 1983-84, 1985–86, 1989–90, 1990–91, 1994–95
- Greek Cup: 1983-84, 1985–86, 1987–88, 1988–89, 1990–91, 1992–93, 1993–94, 1994-95
- Greek Super Cup: 1988, 1993
