= Nikos Vamvakoulas =

Greek footballer

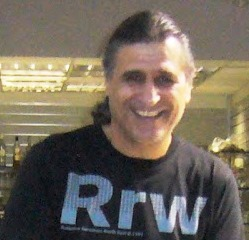

Personal information
- Full name: Nikolaos Vamvakoulas
- Date of birth: 31 January 1957 (age 69)
- Place of birth: Lavrio, Greece
- Height: 1.83 m (6 ft 0 in)
- Position: Defender

Youth career
- –1977: Olympiacos Lavrio

Senior career*
Years	Team	Apps	(Gls)
1978–1985	Olympiacos	197	(18)
1985–1989	Panathinaikos	74	(1)
1990–1991	Ionikos	25	(5)
1991–1992	OFI	19	(0)
1992	PAS Giannina		
1992–1993	Ionikos	18	(0)

International career
1981–1987	Greece	30	(0)

Managerial career
- 1996: Korinthos
- * Club domestic league appearances and goals

Nikos Vamvakoulas (Greek: Νίκος Βαμβακούλας; born 31 January 1957) is a Greek retired football defender.

== Club career ==
Born in Lavrio, Vamvakoulas started playing football at the local for Olympiacos Lavrio. In 1978 he was signed by Olympiacos, where he played until 1985, winning 3 championships, 1 cup and the Greek Super Cup in 1980. Then he moved to the rival club Panathinaikos, where he spent 4 seasons, adding to his titles another championship in 1986, 3 cups and the 1988 Greek Super Cup. Afterwards, he played at Ionikos for a season before moving to OFI for half a season. In 1992 he moved to PAS Giannina and later returned to Ionikos to finish his career in 1993.

== International career ==
Vamvakoulas made 30 appearances for the Greece national football team from 1981 to 1987.

== Personal life ==
Vamvakoulas has written the hymn of Olympiacos.

== Honours ==
=== Club ===
Olympiacos

- Alpha Ethniki: 1980–81, 1981–82, 1982–83
- Greek Cup: 1980–81
- Greek Super Cup: 1980

Panathinaikos

- Alpha Ethniki: 1985–86
- Greek Cup: 1985–86, 1987–88, 1988–89
- Greek Super Cup: 1988
