= 1985–86 Alpha Ethniki =

50th season of top-tier football league in Greece

Alpha Ethniki
- Season: 1985–86
- Champions: Panathinaikos; 14th Greek title
- Relegated: Panserraikos; Panachaiki
- European Cup: Panathinaikos
- UEFA Cup: OFI; Olympiacos
- Cup Winners' Cup: AEK Athens
- Matches: 240
- Goals: 556 (2.32 per match)
- Top goalscorer: Nikos Anastopoulos (19 goals)

The 1985–86 Alpha Ethniki was the 50th season of the highest football league of Greece. The season began on 7 September 1985 and ended on 27 April 1986. Panathinaikos won their 14th Greek title.

The point system was: Win: 2 points - Draw: 1 point.

== Teams ==
Promoted from 1984–85 Beta Ethniki	Relegated from 1984–85 Alpha Ethniki
PAS Giannina; Panserraikos	Egaleo; Pierikos

Location of teams in 1985–86 Alpha Ethniki

== League table ==
Pos	Team	Pld	W	D	L	GF	GA	GD	Pts	Qualification or relegation
1	Panathinaikos (C)	30	18	7	5	58	26	+32	43	Qualification for European Cup first round
2	OFI	30	16	6	8	41	31	+10	38	Qualification for UEFA Cup first round (Note: AEK Athens and Iraklis tied at third place with 36 points. Despite AEK was found guilty for bribe against Panserraikos, the HFF punished the club with three points deduction from 1986–87 season. A play-off game was scheduled to play in Volos on 23 June. Iraklis made a protest and showed up with 10 players. At the 53rd minute with the score at 0–0, the match interrupted permanently. At this minute Iraklis after two red cards and 2 injuries, stay with 6 players on the pitch. The game forfeited to AEK with 2–0.)
3	AEK Athens	30	13	10	7	42	28	+14	36	Qualification for UEFA Cup first round
4	Iraklis	30	14	8	8	34	22	+12	36	
5	Olympiacos	30	14	6	10	57	42	+15	34	Qualification for Cup Winners' Cup first round (Note: Since Panathinaikos, winners of 1985–86 Greek Football Cup, were qualified for the 1986–87 European Cup, losing cup finalists Olympiacos earned a spot in the first round of the 1986–87 European Cup Winners' Cup.)
6	Panionios	30	14	6	10	38	33	+5	34	
7	Aris	30	11	11	8	35	29	+6	33	
8	AEL	30	12	6	12	36	31	+5	30	
9	Apollon Kalamarias	30	9	10	11	25	30	−5	28	
10	PAOK	30	10	7	13	33	38	−5	27	
11	Apollon Smyrnis	30	5	14	11	19	34	−15	24	
12	Ethnikos Piraeus	30	6	12	12	27	39	−12	24	
13	PAS Giannina	30	8	8	14	30	42	−12	24	
14	Doxa Drama	30	7	10	13	24	43	−19	24	
15	Panserraikos (R)	30	8	8	14	28	45	−17	24	Relegation to Beta Ethniki
16	Panachaiki (Note: Panachaiki were deducted 1 point.) (R)	30	8	5	17	29	43	−14	20	Relegation to Beta Ethniki

Source: RSSSF
Rules for classification: 1st points; 2nd head-to-head points; 3rd head-to-head goal difference; 4th decision match.
(C) Champions; (R) Relegated

== Results ==
Home \ Away	AEK	AEL	APA	APK	ARIS	DOX	ETH	IRA	OFI	OLY	PNC	PAO	PAN	PNS	PAOK	PAS
AEK Athens		2–2	1–1	2–1	1–1	1–1	2–0	4–1	1–0	0–0	3–0	0–0	1–1	3–0	1–0	4–1
AEL	2–0		3–0	1–0	1–2	2–0	2–1	2–0	3–0	2–1	3–0	0–2	0–0	2–3	2–1	3–0
Apollon Smyrnis	0–3	1–2		0–0	1–1	0–0	1–1	0–0	1–2	1–0	0–0	0–3	0–0	1–1	1–0	1–1
Apollon Kalamarias	0–1	0–0	0–0		0–0	1–0	1–1	1–0	0–2	1–2	1–0	2–1	1–0	0–0	1–1	2–1
Aris	0–3	1–0	0–1	1–1		1–1	2–1	0–0	2–0	1–0	2–0	0–0	3–0	2–1	3–1	2–2
Doxa Drama	1–0	2–1	0–0	2–1	2–1		1–0	0–0	0–2	3–3	1–1	1–1	1–1	0–0	2–1	2–0
Ethnikos Piraeus	1–1	0–0	1–3	1–1	1–1	2–1		0–0	2–3	2–0	0–0	0–2	3–2	1–0	0–0	1–1
Iraklis	3–0	2–0	1–0	1–0	1–1	2–0	1–0		1–0	3–1	2–0	3–1	3–1	1–1	0–0	2–1
OFI	2–0	2–0	0–0	0–1	2–1	1–0	1–1	1–0		0–1	2–0	4–3	1–0	2–0	2–0	2–1
Olympiacos	2–2	2–0	2–0	4–2	3–2	7–0	2–2	2–2	3–3		2–0	1–2	4–3	4–0	2–0	3–0
Panachaiki	2–2	2–0	2–1	0–2	0–2	4–3	3–0	0–2 (Note: Panachaiki-Iraklis 1–0, awarded 0–2 because Panachaiki used a player who was under yellow cards suspension.)	1–2	1–2		0–0	1–0	4–0	2–1	2–0
Panathinaikos	2–1	3–2	3–0	2–2	1–2	2–0	2–0	1–0	4–1	1–2	3–2		3–0	4–0	5–0	4–2
Panionios	0–1	2–0	1–0	2–1	1–0	4–0	2–0	1–0	4–3	1–0	2–0	1–1		2–1	2–1	2–1
Panserraikos	2–0	0–0	0–4	0–1	1–1	2–0	1–2	2–3	1–1	4–1	2–1	0–1	1–0		4–1	1–0
PAOK	2–1	1–1	5–0	4–1	1–0	1–0	2–1	1–0	0–0	1–0	2–1	0–1	1–2	0–0		4–2
PAS Giannina	0–1	1–0	1–1	1–0	2–0	1–0	1–2	1–0	0–0	3–1	1–0	0–0	1–1	3–0	1–1	

Source: RSSSF
Legend: Blue = home team win; Yellow = draw; Red = away team win.

=== Third place play-off ===
23 June 1986
20:10 EEST (UTC+3)

AEK Athens	2–0 (Awarded)	Iraklis
	Report

Volos Municipal Stadium, Volos
Attendance: 10,000
Referee: Giannis Triantafyllou (Dodecanese)

Iraklis showed up with ten men, who entered the pitch in pairs and thus the match started with a 10-minute delay. At the 24th and 45th minute Zifkas and Karaiskos of Iraklis were sent-off. Moreover, at the 51st minute, 54th minute Santexis and Adamou of Iraklis could not continue the match due to injuries, leaving their team with 6 players. Thus the match was awarded by 2–0 to AEK.

== Top scorers ==
Rank	Player	Club	Goals
1	(Greece) Nikos Anastopoulos	Olympiacos	19
2	(Greece) Dimitris Saravakos	Panathinaikos	15
3	(Bulgaria) Todor Barzov	Panionios	12
3	(Sweden) Håkan Sandberg	AEK Athens	12
5	(Hungary) Márton Esterházy	AEK Athens	11
5	(Greece) Dimitris Mavrikis	Panionios	11
5	(Greece) Georgios Skartados	PAOK	11
8	(Greece) Michalis Ziogas	AEL	10
8	(Greece) Vasilis Chardalias	Panachaiki	10

== Attendances ==
Panathinaikos drew the highest average home attendance in the 1985–86 Alpha Ethniki.

#	Football club	Home games	Average attendance
1	Panathinaikos	15	45,000
2	Olympiacos	15	42,602
3	AEK Athens	15	31,439
4	PAOK	15	13,811
5	Aris	15	11,534
6	Iraklis	15	10,744
7	Ethnikos Piraeus	15	9,200
8	AEL	15	8,630
9	Panionios	15	8,542
10	PAS Giannina	15	8,531
11	OFI	15	7,221
12	Panachaiki	15	6,809
13	Panserraikos	15	6,804
14	Doxa Drama	15	4,956
15	Apollon Kalamarias	15	4,923
16	Apollon Smyrnis	15	4,908
