= Nikos Sarganis =

Greek footballer (1954–2024)

Personal information
- Full name: Nikolaos Sarganis
- Date of birth: 13 January 1954
- Place of birth: Rafina, Greece
- Date of death: 8 December 2024 (aged 70)
- Place of death: Athens, Greece
- Height: 1.84 m (6 ft 0 in)
- Position: Goalkeeper

Youth career
- 1971–1974: Ilisiakos

Senior career*
Years	Team	Apps	(Gls)
1974–1977	Ilisiakos	89	(0)
1977–1980	Kastoria	78	(0)
1980–1985	Olympiacos	144	(4)
1985–1990	Panathinaikos	85	(2)
1990–1992	Athinaikos	37	(0)
Total		433	(6)

International career
1980–1991	Greece	58	(0)
- * Club domestic league appearances and goals

Nikos Sarganis (Greek: Νίκος Σαργκάνης; 13 January 1954 – 8 December 2024) was a Greek professional footballer who played as a goalkeeper.

== Club career ==
Born in Rafina, Attica, (however, his families origins are from the village of Papadianika, Peloponnese where he received an honourable reward from the village) Sarganis started his football career as a full-back at Ilisiakos. He switched to goalkeeper under the guidance of his coach, Christos Ribas, himself a capable goalkeeper of the 1930s.

Sarganis moved on to Kastoria in 1977 and played for the furriers until the end of the 1980 season. He was part of the team that shocked the Greek football world by winning the Greek Cup in 1980. Following that triumph, he transferred to Olympiacos where he played from 1980 until the end of the 1985 season.

Sarganis then controversially joined Olympiacos' arch-rivals, Panathinaikos and played for the greens for the next five years. On 8 May 1988, Sarganis helped win the Greek Cup for Panathinaikos in a penalty shootout by saving two Olympiacos penalty shots while scoring one himself.

In 1990, he continued his career at Athinaikos where he played for two seasons before he retired.

== Internantional career ==
Sarganis was capped 58 times by the Greece national team. His international high point came on 15 October 1980, when he preserved a 1–0 Greek victory in Copenhagen against Denmark. The Danish press gave him the nickname Phantom by which he would be known throughout the rest of his career.

== Personal life ==
Sarganis had a wife and a daughter named Mirella. He was an active member of Veteran team of Olympiacos.

== Death ==
Sarganis died from cancer in Athens on 8 December 2024, at the age of 70.

== Honours ==
Kastoria

- Greek Cup: 1979–80

Olympiacos

- Alpha Ethniki: 1980–81, 1981–82, 1982–83
- Greek Cup: 1980–81

Panathinaikos

- Alpha Ethniki: 1985–86, 1989–90
- Greek Cup: 1985–86, 1987–88, 1988–89
- Greek Super Cup: 1988
