= Juan Ramón Rocha =

Argentine footballer and manager

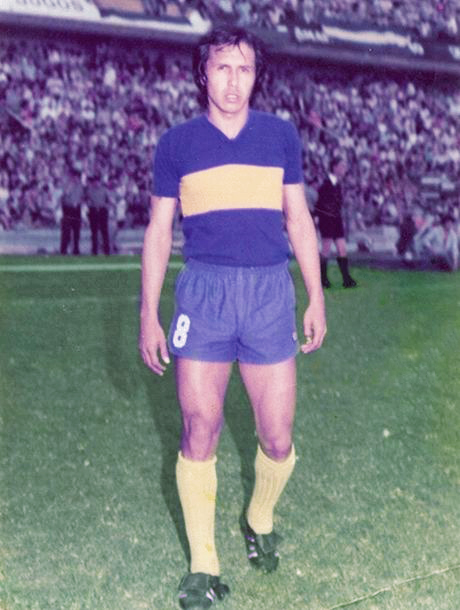
- Rocha playing for Boca Juniors

Personal information
- Full name: Juan Ramón Rocha
- Date of birth: 8 March 1954 (age 72)
- Place of birth: Santo Tomé, Argentina
- Position: Midfielder

Team information
- Current team: Aias Gastouni (manager)

Youth career
- 1960–1970: Avanti Santo Tome Academy

Senior career*
Years	Team	Apps	(Gls)
1971–1977	Newell's Old Boys	135	(26)
1977–1978	Atlético Junior	15	(3)
1978–1979	Boca Juniors	26	(3)
1979–1989	Panathinaikos	227	(13)
Total		403	(45)

International career
1973–1977	Argentina	3	(0)

Managerial career
- 1989–1990: Paniliakos
- 1990–1991: Ilisiakos
- 1991–1992: Kalamata
- 1994–1996: Panathinaikos
- 1997–1999: Aris
- 1999: Panathinaikos
- 2001–2003: Skoda Xanthi
- 2006–2007: Ilisiakos
- 2007–2008: Olympiakos Nicosia
- 2008–2012: Panathinaikos U20
- 2012–2013: Panathinaikos
- 2017–2018: Ruch Chorzów
- 2019–2025: Thesprotos
- 2025–: Aias Gastouni
- * Club domestic league appearances and goals as of August 28, 2007

Juan Ramón Rocha (born 8 March 1954) is an Argentine professional football manager and former player.

== Playing career ==
Born in Santo Tomé, Corrientes, Rocha began his professional career at Newell's Old Boys in 1972, he was part of their Metropolitano winning team in 1974. He moved to Boca Juniors in 1979 and played in 1979 Copa Libertadores finals. In December 1979, he was transferred to Greek soccer club Panathinaikos, where he played until his retirement on July 1, 1989.

Nicknamed The Indian, Rocha was a skillful player, with vision and remarkable sportsmanship. He is considered by many one of the greatest players in the team's history. Rocha was first signed for Panathinaikos under the name Boublis with Greek papers; the subsequent discovery of record falsifications and ensuing scandal almost landed Rocha in jail and Panathinaikos in the second division. These allegations were later dismissed and both Panathinaikos and Rocha were acquitted. This was one of the many cases of "hellenization" of foreign players for many Greek soccer clubs.

== Managerial career ==
After retirement he started coaching, first Paniliakos in where he was coach-player at the Fourth Division, then Iliasiakos, Kalamata and Skoda Xanthi.

On March 12, 1994, Ivica Osim was removed from the technical leadership of Panathinaikos 6 games before the end of the 1993–94 season and Rocha was asked to replace him.

After Rocha's arrival, Panathinaikos recorded 8 wins, winning all of their remaining games, including the cup final against AEK, which was marred by riots and conflict between fans, on penalties. In the first 3 games with Rocha, Panathinaikos scored wide wins against Iraklis (3–0), Larissa (5–0) and Doxa (8–0) earning the trust of Panathinaikos who decided to keep him in place. Rocha made significant changes to Osim's game plan, putting his own stamp on the reform. He made Juan José Borrelli, who was under question and possible transfer during Osim's reign, a vital member of the starting lineup as well as G.S. Georgiadis, G.H. Georgiades, Doni, Kapouranis to whom he gave different roles as was the case with the placement of Apostolakis as a defensive half.

Before the start of the next season, Panathinaikos won the Super Cup in August 1994 by defeating AEK Athens 3–0. At the end of the 1994–95 season they also won a double. In the championship they finished first with a 16-point difference from 2nd place Olympiacos, scoring 83 goals while they won 5 games scoring 5 goals and 2 games scoring 6. To reach the final of the Greek Cup they had to beat Olympiacos 2–3 at Karaiskaki. In the cup final, he won the trophy by defeating AEK Athens 1–0. Having won 3-0 during the championship he completed 4 victories against AEK in one year (20/4/1994 - 19/4/1995).

In 1995–96, he repeated his success as a coach in reaching the Champions League last four by guiding Panathinaikos to the semi-final against Ajax. Having overcome the obstacles of Hajduk Split, FC Nantes, FC Porto, Aalborg BK and Legia Warsaw, Panathinaikos on 3 April 1996 won 1–0 in Amsterdam against Ajax, who had not been defeated in a European match since 16 March 1994. However, they failed to qualify for the final in the replay. They also won the Greek championship. By defeating Olympiacos at home and away, he became the third Panathinaikos coach to do so after Kinsler and Gorski, while in the following years only Víctor Muñoz in 2007 became the winner of both league derbies.

Rocha was removed from Panathinaikos on 13 October 1996, having earlier been eliminated from the Champions League and UEFA Cup qualifiers by Rosenborg MK and Legia respectively. He also managed Olympiakos Nicosia in Cyprus.

He then became member of the scouting team of Panathinaikos, mostly searching players in Argentina and South America. After Jesualdo Ferreira resigned at 14 November 2012, Rocha once more became the manager of Panathinaikos.

On 11 September 2017 he was introduced as the coach of Ruch Chorzów.

In the 2019 close season, he became manager of Thesprotos of Igoumenitsa, right after the team was promoted for the first time to the professional divisions. It was a surprise to the Thesprotos board that Rocha had accepted their offer and Rocha claimed that his romanticist attitude to football determined him to try out a new challenge. In the 2019-20 season in which the decades-old Second Division (Football League) became the third division upon the creation of Super League Greece 2 and the old Gamma Ethniki became the Fourth Division, Rocha led Thesprotos to a safe tenth-place position in a season that ended three matchdays before its scheduled conclusion due to the COVID-19 pandemic.

The team wouldn't play official games for quite some time as due to the second wave of COVID-19 in Greece the 2020-21 Football League season was postponed in October 2020 and the teams weren't allowed to participate in the 2020-21 edition of the Greek Football Cup, which for that year only was limited to Superleague teams. Alas, on 27 March 2021, the team played its first game in almost 10 months and finished the season exactly three months later with a safe 6th-place finish in their ten team North Group. That summer, the Football League was finally dissolved and the Gamma Ethniki returned to Third Division status and Thesprotos qualified to the Super League Greece 2 for the first time in its history. By this point, financial problems were surging and players had been getting lower wages, however Rocha pledged allegiance to the club and extended his stay with Thesprotos.

Wielding a squad with an average player age of 22.2 years old, Rocha led Thesprotos to a scrupulous first season in the Second Division. In spite of only three wins in the last 20 games of the season, a crucial 3–0 win against Panserraikos three games before the end of the season was enough to keep Thesprotos in Super League Greece 2 for another season, finishing with 34 points in 32 games, 2 points above relegation, mostly thanks to a very strong start to the season that was hamstrung by injury and finance problems. Moreover, another early elimination from the Greek Cup this season along with the bad 2022 results prompted Rocha to ask for bigger fan support as attendances had been decreasing compared to previous years.

The problems continued into the 2022-23 season and Rocha by this point felt, according to himself, that he was "not just their manager anymore, but also their life counselor, because I had also lived these rough moments. We had to do work with Thesprotos from scratch and I developed a special connection with my players who are amazing characters, hailing here from Greece and 3-4 of them from Argentina". All of these problems for Thesprotos off the pitch started to reflect on the pitch as the team found itself deep into a dead-end relegation battle from the start of the season. By November 2022, Rocha claimed that his players had been unpaid for 3–4 months, thanks to the insufficient funds from the HFF and could almost only rely on the funds coming from the main sponsor of Super League 2, Bettson. The team finally recorded its first win of the season on 23 January 2023 against fellow languishing team Apollon Larissa, a 6–0 thrashing of the latter. However, the team wouldn't play another match until mid-March, as the league was postponed following complaints made by all 30 teams for the announcement of a payment package by the Deputy Minister of Sports Lefteris Avgenakis which was three times lower (1.7 million euros) than what the teams claimed to have agreed with them and the HFF at the start of the season (5.1 million euros). This ensuing crisis further highlighted the financial problems of not only Thesprotos, but of all the Super League 2 clubs and further pointed to the chaotic difference between Super League 1 and 2.

Right before the return, tragedy struck to the club, as on 1 March 2023, Iordanis Adamakis, a 22 year old acquisition of the club in the 2022 summer transfer window and player of the club up until that point, was tragically killed in the Tempi train crash. Rocha, along with everyone in the club and in local community, mourned his loss, and Rocha was devastated by the loss of a player with whom he had an excellent relationship with him, even speaking up on social media and national television about the level of the tragedy to both him and everybody involved. "I wish I could hug his family, I really do" was the final comment of Rocha on television and people all over Greece praised him for his loyalty to his players and his affection towards them.

In spite of the heavy blow on the team's morale after Adamakis' tragic death, the teams returned to action Rocha and his players fought bravely for survival, but relegation was confirmed on 4 May 2023 after a 2–3 win at Diagoras Rodou. The team wrapped up the season with 0-5 and 5-1 losses to Almopos Arideas and Iraklis and finished with 20 points in 28 games (one folded due to Apollon Larissa being expelled from the league) and only one win at home (the 6–0 win against A. Larissa) and to add insult to injury, Thesprotos were deducted 3 points near the end of the season due to their financial difficulties, essentially finishing with 17 points and 4 wins at the final table. Rocha agreed to continue to manage the club after the end of the season in spite of the failures and hardships that came with this season and on 8 June, for his unwavering loyalty to Thesprotos Football Club, he was announced to become an Honorary Citizen of Igoumenitsa, with the public ceremony taking place at the Municipal Stadium of Igoumenitsa (Thesprotos' home stadium) on 10 June, right before the match against Almopos.

On 27 October 2025, Juan Ramón Rocha resigned from the coaching position of Thesprotos.

On 17 November 2025, Juan Ramón Rocha signed for Elis FCA First Division club Aias Gastouni.

== Managerial statistics ==
Team	From	To	Record				
Team	From	To	G	W	D	L	Win %
Paniliakos	19 July 1989	30 June 1990	38	28	7	3	73.7
Ilisiakos	1 July 1990	30 June 1991	39	17	11	11	43.5
Kalamata	4 August 1991	30 June 1992	38	15	5	18	39.5
Panathinaikos	14 March 1994	13 October 1996	126	92	19	15	73.0
Aris Thessaloniki	21 January 1997	15 April 1997	12	2	4	6	16.6
Panathinaikos	3 March 1999	3 June 1999	16	9	5	2	56.3
Skoda Xanthi	26 December 2000	3 February 2001	7	3	0	4	42.9
Ilisiakos	13 December 2005	27 February 2006	9	1	3	5	11.1
Olympiakos Nicosia	23 November 2006	28 September 2007	18	6	6	6	33.3
Panathinaikos U20	1 July 2009	14 November 2012	100	51	30	19	51.0
Panathinaikos	14 November 2012	7 January 2013	10	5	1	4	50.0
Ruch Chorzów	10 September 2017	5 April 2018	14	6	1	7	42.8
Thesprotos	28 August 2019	28 October 2025	178	54	41	83	30.3
Total			605	289	133	183	47.77

== Honours ==
=== Player ===
Newell's Old Boys

- Metropolitano: 1974

Panathinaikos

- Greek Cup: 1982, 1984, 1986, 1988, 1989
- Alpha Ethniki: 1983–84, 1985–86

=== Manager ===
Panathinaikos

- Greek Cup: 1995
- Alpha Ethniki: 1994–95, 1995–96
- Greek Super Cup: 1994
