= 1990–91 AEK Athens F.C. season =

AEK Athens
1990–91 season
- Chairman: Stratos Gidopoulos (until 19 March); Kostas Angelopoulos (until 12 May); Kostas Generakis
- Manager: Dušan Bajević
- Stadium: AEK Stadium
- Alpha Ethniki: 3rd
- Greek Cup: Round of 16
- Top goalscorer: League: Daniel Batista (13); All: Daniel Batista (14)
- Highest home attendance: 21,716 vs Panathinaikos (25 November 1990)
- Lowest home attendance: 1,162 vs Charavgiakos (9 January 1991)
- Average home league attendance: 10,306
- Biggest win: AEK Athens 6–0 Xanthi
- Biggest defeat: Panathinaikos 4–0 AEK Athens
Home colours	Away colours

The 1990–91 season was the 67th season in the existence of AEK Athens F.C. and the 32nd consecutive season in the top flight of Greek football. They competed in the Alpha Ethniki and the Greek Cup. The season began on 26 August 1990 and finished on 2 June 1991.

== Kits ==
Supplier: Diadora
Sponsor(s): Ethniki Asfalistiki

Home	Away

== Overview ==
AEK Athens faced administrative and financial problems. As a result, the season marked a transitional period, as the president Stratos Gidopoulos could no longer provide the club with financial support. The club made no significant signings, with Vaios Karagiannis being the only notable addition. The team did not participate in any European competition, due to a ban from the previous season.

In the Cup, AEK advanced as winners from their respective group and qualified without a match in the round of 32, where they eliminated Charavgiakos with two wins. In the round of 16, AEK were drawn against OFI and in the first leg at Theodoros Vardinogiannis Stadium they underperformed and faced a 3–0 defeat. Their strong performance at the second leg with 3–1 was not enough to secure qualification for the next round.

As the season drew to a close, the financial issues of the club created a growing tension between Gidopoulos, Bajević and the footballers. This situation eventually led Gidopoulos to come into conflict with Bajević, the players and the supporters, which caused him to step down from the presidency, for the good of the club. Afterwards, the Court of First Instance appointed an interim administration with Kostas Generakis as president.

In an otherwise disappointing season, AEK failed to challenge for any honours, finishing 3rd in the league. Their top scorer with 14 goals was Daniel Batista, prompting the club to strengthen the squad around him in order to maintain Bajević's attacking style of play. The highlights of the season included the victory at the derby against Olympiacos in Rhodes and a convincing 6–0 win against Xanthi. The main positive aspect of the season was the time afforded to Bajević to prepare the resurgence of the club in the following seasons which ultimately proved justified.

== Management team ==
Position	Staff
Manager	(Socialist Federal Republic of Yugoslavia) Dušan Bajević
Assistant manager	(Greece) Petros Ravousis
Goalkeeping coach	(Greece) Stelios Serafidis
Academy manager	(Greece) Giorgos Kefalidis
Scout	(Greece) Aris Tsachouridis
Head of Medical	(Greece) Lakis Nikolaou

== Players ==
=== Squad information ===
NOTE: The players are the ones that have been announced by the AEK Athens' press release. No edits should be made unless a player arrival or exit is announced. Updated 2 June 1991, 23:59 UTC+3.

Player	Nat.	Position(s)	Date of birth (Age)	Signed	Previous club	Transfer fee	Contract until
Goalkeepers
Antonis Minou	(Greece)	GK	4 May 1958 (aged 33)	1988	(Greece) Panathinaikos	₯50,000,000	1991
Spyros Ikonomopoulos	(Greece)	GK	25 July 1959 (aged 31)	1979	(Greece) AEK Athens U20	—	1993
Fanis Kofinas	(Greece)	GK	5 September 1960 (aged 30)	1982	(Greece) Pelopas Kiato	Free	1992
Defenders
Makis Chatzis	(Greece)	RB / LB	30 March 1957 (aged 34)	1984	(Greece) Apollon Athens	₯6,750,000	1994
Takis Karagiozopoulos (Captain)	(Greece)	CB / DM / ST	4 February 1961 (aged 30)	1981	(Greece) Veria	₯8,000,000	1991
Stelios Manolas	(Greece)	CB / RB	13 July 1961 (aged 29)	1980	(Greece) AEK Athens U20	—	1993
Giorgos Peppes	(Greece)	CB	26 October 1961 (aged 29)	1986	(Greece) Ethnikos Piraeus	₯10,000,000	1991
Christos Vasilopoulos	(Greece)	RB / LB	12 November 1962 (aged 28)	1986	(Greece) Panachaiki	₯8,000,000	1991
Georgios Koutoulas	(Greece)	CB / LB	9 February 1967 (aged 24)	1987	(Greece) AEK Athens U20	—	1993
Vaios Karagiannis	(Greece)	LB / CB	25 June 1968 (aged 23)	1990	(Greece) A.O. Karditsa	₯11,000,000	1992
Anastasios Pourikas	(Greece)	CB	14 October 1970 (aged 20)	1990	(Greece) Toxotis Larissa	Free	1991
Midfielders
Mirosław Okoński (Vice-captain 2)	(Poland)	AM / ST / SS	8 December 1958 (aged 32)	1988	(West Germany) Hamburger SV	₯100,000,000	1991
Pavlos Papaioannou	(Greece) (Brazil)	DM / RB / LB / RM	19 May 1959 (aged 32)	1983	(Greece) Rodos	₯10,000,000	1993
Giorgos Savvidis (Vice-captain)	(Cyprus)	RM / AM / RW / SS / ST	8 February 1961 (aged 30)	1987	(Cyprus) Omonia	₯20,940,600	1992
Lampros Georgiadis	(Greece)	LM / AM / LB	11 July 1963 (aged 27)	1986	(Greece) Anagennisi Arta	₯11,000,000	1991
Toni Savevski	(Socialist Federal Republic of Yugoslavia)	CM / LM / DM	14 July 1963 (aged 27)	1988	(Socialist Federal Republic of Yugoslavia) Vardar	₯34,000,000	1991
Jim Patikas	(Australia) (Greece)	RM / LM / RW / LW / SS	18 October 1963 (aged 27)	1985	(Australia) Sydney Croatia	₯5,000,000	1991
Stavros Stamatis	(Greece)	DM / CM / CB / RB / LB / AM	31 January 1966 (aged 25)	1988	(Greece) Charavgiakos	₯22,000,000	1993
Giorgos Famelis	(Greece)	CM / DM	19 August 1967 (aged 23)	1988	(Greece) AO Vouliagmeni	₯3,000,000	1991
Panagiotis Pangratis	(Greece)	AM / CM / DM	4 May 1971 (aged 20)	1989	(Greece) Galatsi	₯2,200,000	1991
Giorgos Papakostoulis	(Greece)	CM	2 October 1971 (aged 19)	1988	(Greece) Atromitos Agioi Anargyroi	Free	1991
Forwards
Daniel Batista	(Cape Verde) (Netherlands)	ST / SS / AM	9 September 1964 (aged 26)	1989	(Greece) Ethnikos Piraeus	Free	1992
Giannis Milopoulos	(Greece) (Soviet Union)	SS / ST / AM	21 February 1966 (aged 25)	1990	(Soviet Union) Pakhtakor	Free	1992
Frank Klopas	(United States) (Greece)	SS / ST / AM	1 September 1966 (aged 24)	1988	(United States) Chicago Sting	Free	1993
Georgios Christodoulou	(Greece)	ST / SS / LW	20 May 1967 (aged 24)	1985	(Greece) Akratitos	Free	1993
Spyros Goumas	(Greece)	ST	24 February 1970 (aged 21)	1989	(Greece) AEK Athens U20	—	1992

== Transfers ==
=== In ===
==== Summer ====
Pos.	Player	From	Fee	Date	Contract Until	Source
DF	(Greece) Anastasios Pourikas	(Greece) Toxotis Larissa	Free transfer	15 July 1990	30 June 1991	
DF	(Greece) Vaios Karagiannis	(Greece) A.O. Karditsa	₯11,000,000^{[a]}	28 June 1990	30 June 1992	
DF	(Greece) Dimitris Volonakis	(Greece) Diagoras	Loan return	1 July 1990	30 June 1990	
MF	(Greece) Charalampos Zarotiadis	(Greece) Kallithea	Loan return	1 July 1990	30 June 1991	
FW	(Greece) Michalis Manginas	(Greece) Kallithea	Loan return	1 July 1990	30 June 1990	
FW	(Australia) Dimosthenis Batalis	(Greece) Kallithea	Loan return	1 July 1990	30 November 1991	
FW	(Greece) Giannis Milopoulos	(Soviet Union) Pakhtakor	Free transfer	14 July 1990	30 June 1991	

Notes

a. and a friendly game between the two clubs.

=== Out ===
==== Summer ====
Pos.	Player	To	Fee	Date	Source
DF	(Greece) Dimitris Volonakis	(Greece) Egaleo	End of contract	15 July 1990	
MF	(Greece) Charalampos Zarotiadis	(Greece) Kallithea	Free transfer	4 July 1990	
FW	(Greece) Michalis Manginas	(Greece) Egaleo	Contract termination	16 July 1990	

=== Loan out ===
==== Summer ====
Pos.	Player	To	Fee	Date	Until	Option to buy	Source
FW	(Australia) Dimosthenis Batalis	(Greece) Kallithea	Free	15 July 1990	30 June 1991	✗	

=== Contract renewals ===
Pos.	Player	Date	Former Exp. Date	New Exp. Date	Source
GK	(Greece) Antonis Minou	10 June 1991	30 June 1991	30 June 1993	
DF	(Greece) Takis Karagiozopoulos	12 June 1991	30 June 1991	30 June 1993	
DF	(Greece) Christos Vasilopoulos	12 June 1991	30 June 1991	30 June 1993	
MF	(Socialist Federal Republic of Yugoslavia) Toni Savevski	10 June 1991	30 June 1991	30 June 1993	
MF	(Greece) Lampros Georgiadis	14 June 1991	30 June 1991	30 June 1994	
MF	(Australia) Jim Patikas	10 June 1991	30 June 1991	30 June 1993	
FW	(Greece) Giannis Milopoulos	17 June 1991	30 June 1991	30 June 1992	

=== Overall transfer activity ===
==== Expenditure ====
Summer: ▼ ₯11,000,000

Winter: ▼ ₯0

Total: ▼ ₯11,000,000

==== Income ====
Summer: ▲ ₯0

Winter: ▲ ₯0

Total: ▲ ₯0

==== Net Totals ====
Summer: ▼ ₯11,000,000

Winter: ₯0

Total: ▼ ₯11,000,000

== Pre-season and friendlies ==
21 July 1990 Friendly	Hamburger SV	0–0	AEK Athens	Hamburg
16:30 EEST (UTC+3)		Report		Stadium: Volksparkstadion; Attendance: 5,000

25 July 1990 Friendly	Esterwegen	0–5	AEK Athens	Bremen
18:30 EEST (UTC+3)		Report	Christodoulou (penalty missed) 7'; Patikas 47'; Batista 57'; Reagen 67' (o.g.); Famelis 77'; Savvidis 82'	Attendance: 1,000

29 July 1990 Friendly	Blau-Weiß Lohne	1–3	AEK Athens
	Tilgen 14'; Mayer (penalty missed) 75'	Report	Katrimoustakis (yellow card) 40'; Savevski 62', 90'; Patikas 70'

4 August 1990 Friendly	OFI	2–1	AEK Athens	Heraklion
18:00 EEST (UTC+3)	Fandi 25'; Vlastos 65'	Report	Batista 6'	Stadium: Theodoros Vardinogiannis Stadium; Attendance: 4,500; Referee: Giorgos Koukoulakis (Heraklion)
Note: The incomes of the match were allocated to support the former footballer of OFI, Stamatis Vourdamis.

8 August 1990 Friendly	PAOK	1–0	AEK Athens	Thessaloniki
21:00 EEST (UTC+3)	Tolba 51'	Report		Stadium: Toumba Stadium; Attendance: 8,931; Referee: Nikos Vournelis (Thessaloniki)

13 August 1990 Friendly	AEK Athens	1–2	PAOK	Nea Filadelfeia
21:00 EEST (UTC+3)	Peppes 24'	Report	Hassan 55'; Anastasiadis 72'	Stadium: AEK Stadium; Attendance: 10,000; Referee: Kostas Dimitriadis (Piraeus)

17 August 1990 Friendly	AEK Athens	2–0	AEL	Nea Filadelfeia
21:00 EEST (UTC+3)	Okoński 42' (pen.); Christodoulou 50'	Report		Stadium: AEK Stadium; Attendance: 2,100; Referee: Stelios Charlavanis (Euboea)

20 August 1990 Friendly	AEK Athens	1–1	Olympiacos	Nea Filadelfeia
21:00 EEST (UTC+3)	Batista 6'	Report	Mavromatis 39' (pen.)	Stadium: AEK Stadium; Attendance: 10,025; Referee: Giorgos Giannopoulos (Athens)

23 August 1990 Friendly	AEK Athens	0–1	Iraklis	Nea Filadelfeia
21:00 EEST (UTC+3)		Report	Adamou 57'	Stadium: AEK Stadium; Attendance: 1,906; Referee: Giannis Iatropoulos (Piraeus)

5 September 1990 Friendly	AEK Athens	3–0	Panionios	Nea Filadelfeia
21:00 EEST (UTC+3)	Savvidis 24'; Batista 39' (pen.); Karagiannis (yellow card) 69'; Vasilopoulos 71'	Report	Koutropoulos (yellow card) 39'; Karavidas (penalty missed) 59'	Stadium: AEK Stadium; Attendance: 4,000; Referee: Kostas Adamopoulos (Athens)

10 October 1990 Friendly	A.O. Karditsa	0–3	AEK Athens	Karditsa
15:30 EEST (UTC+3)		Report	Papakostoulis 18'; Batista 61'; Milopoulos 70'	Stadium: Municipal Stadium of Karditsa; Attendance: 2,000; Referee: Ilias Chatzis (Karditsa)
Note: Friendly match as part of the transfer of Vaios Karagiannis. On the bench of AEK was the assistant of Bajević, Petros Ravousis.

24 October 1990 Friendly	Vardar	3–0	AEK Athens	Skopje
16:30 EEST (UTC+3)	Babunski 56'; Urošević 63'; Theodoroski 77'	Report		Stadium: City Park Stadium; Attendance: 2,000; Referee: Kostentzief (Yugoslavia)
Note: Friendly match as part of the transfer of Toni Savevski.

18 January 1991 Friendly	AEK Athens	1–0	Torpedo Moscow	Nea Filadelfeia
15:00 EET (UTC+2)	Savevski (penalty missed) 49'; Milopoulos 71'	Report		Stadium: AEK Stadium; Attendance: 103; Referee: Theodoros Kefalas (Athens)

23 January 1991 Friendly	AEK Athens	9–0	AE Chalandri	Thrakomakedones
	Patikas; Savevski; Okoński; Karagiozopoulos; Szuster; Goumas	Report		Stadium: AEK Athens' Training Complex

9 June 1991 Pre-Mediterranean Cup	AEK Athens	5–2	OFI	Rizoupoli
17:30 EEST (UTC+3)	Famelis 2'; Manolas 43'; Patikas 49'; Ikonomopoulos (yellow card) 60'; Milopoulos 58', 66'	Report	Machlas 21'; Vamvakoulas (yellow card) 36'; Goulis 80' (pen.)	Stadium: Rizoupoli Stadium; Attendance: 2,000; Referee: Giannis Iatropoulos (Piraeus)

16 June 1991 Pre-Mediterranean Cup	Athinaikos	0–1	AEK Athens	Ilioupoli
17:30 EEST (UTC+3)		Report	Milopoulos 11'	Stadium: Ilioupoli Municipal Stadium; Attendance: 2,000; Referee: Kostas Dimitriadis (Piraeus)

== Competitions ==
=== Overall record ===
Competition	First match	Last match	Starting round	Final position	Record							
Competition	First match	Last match	Starting round	Final position	Pld	W	D	L	GF	GA	GD	Win %
Alpha Ethniki	16 September 1990	2 June 1991	Matchday 1	3rd	34	18	6	10	59	33	+26	52.94
Greek Cup	26 August 1990	20 February 1991	Group Stage	Round of 16	7	6	0	1	18	5	+13	85.71
Total					41	24	6	11	77	38	+39	58.54

Last updated: 2 June 1991
Source: Competitions

=== Alpha Ethniki ===
==== League table ====
Pos	Team	Pld	W	D	L	GF	GA	GD	Pts	Qualification or relegation
1	Panathinaikos (C)	34	23	8	3	77	22	+55	54	Qualification for European Cup first round
2	Olympiacos (Note: Olympiacos were deducted 2 points.)	34	19	10	5	77	28	+49	46	1-year ban from European competitions (Note: Olympiacos were punished with a one-year ban from all European competitions by the UEFA disciplinary committee after being charged for the eventful European Cup Winners' Cup match against Sampdoria on 24 October 1990.)
3	AEK Athens	34	18	6	10	59	33	+26	42	Qualification for UEFA Cup first round
4	PAOK (Note: PAOK were deducted 3 points.)	34	16	9	9	56	39	+17	38	Qualification for UEFA Cup first round
5	Iraklis	34	14	9	11	40	36	+4	37	

Source: RSSSF
Rules for classification: 1st points; 2nd head-to-head points; 3rd head-to-head goal difference; 4th decision match.
(C) Champions

==== Results summary ====
Overall								Home						Away					
Pld	W	D	L	GF	GA	GD	Pts	W	D	L	GF	GA	GD	W	D	L	GF	GA	GD
34	18	6	10	59	33	+26	42	12	3	2	38	11	+27	6	3	8	21	22	−1

Source: Competitive matches

==== Results by Matchday ====
Round	1	2	3	4	5	6	7	8	9	10	11	12	13	14	15	16	17	18	19	20	21	22	23	24	25	26	27	28	29	30	31	32	33	34
Ground	A	H	A	H	A	H	A	H	A	H	H	A	H	A	H	A	H	H	A	H	A	H	A	H	A	H	A	A	H	A	H	A	H	A
Result	L	W	L	D	W	W	W	L	W	L	W	D	D	W	W	W	W	W	L	W	L	W	L	W	L	W	D	D	D	W	W	L	W	L
Position	14	7	12	10	8	4	3	6	5	5	5	5	4	3	3	3	2	2	3	2	4	4	4	4	4	4	4	4	3	3	3	3	3	3

Source: Competitive matches
A = Away; H = Home; W = Win; D = Draw; L = Loss; P = Postponed

==== Matches ====
16 September 1990 1	OFI	1–0	AEK Athens	Heraklion
17:00 EEST (UTC+3)	Vlastos 41' (pen.); Vavoulas (yellow card) 43'; Vamvakoulas (yellow card) 63'		Vasilopoulos (yellow card) 41'; Papaioannou (yellow card) 88'	Stadium: Theodoros Vardinogiannis Stadium; Attendance: 11,025; Referee: Giannis Latsios (Larissa)

23 September 1990 2	AEK Athens	6–0	Xanthi	Nea Filadelfeia
16:30 EEST (UTC+3)	Savvidis 10', 22', 79'; Klopas 28'; Batista 44', 64'; Famelis (yellow card) 58'		Georgitzikis (yellow card) 55'; Seretis (yellow card) 80'; Angelinas (yellow card) 83'	Stadium: AEK Stadium; Attendance: 12,880; Referee: Dimitris Bentas (Trikala)

30 September 1990 3	Aris	2–1	AEK Athens	Thessaloniki
16:00 EEST (UTC+3)	Kouis 14', 53' (pen.); Charalampidis (yellow card) 54'		Papaioannou (yellow card) 46'; Karagiozopoulos 58' (pen.)	Stadium: Aris Stadium; Attendance: 13,600; Referee: Kostas Dimitriadis (Piraeus)

7 October 1990 4	AEK Athens	0–0	Athinaikos	Nea Filadelfeia
15:30 EEST (UTC+3)	Okoński (yellow card) 9'; Manolas (yellow card) 25'; Karagiozopoulos (yellow card) 79'; Papakostoulis (yellow card) 81'		Taprantzis (yellow card) 14'; Bong (yellow card) 25'; Tzavalias (yellow card) 75'	Stadium: AEK Stadium; Attendance: 13,084; Referee: Giorgos Plevritis (Thessaloniki)

17 October 1990 5	Levadiakos	0–3	AEK Athens	Levadia
15:00 EEST (UTC+3)			Savevski 22'; Batista 32', 85'; Vasilopoulos (yellow card) 54'; Georgiadis (yellow card) 77'	Stadium: Levadia Municipal Stadium; Attendance: 2,739; Referee: Giorgos Koukoulakis (Heraklion)

4 November 1990 6	AEK Athens	1–0	Panserraikos	Nea Filadelfeia
15:00 EET (UTC+2)	Savevski 51'; Papaioannou (yellow card) 86'			Stadium: AEK Stadium; Attendance: 9,637; Referee: Ilias Doutsias (Piraeus)

11 November 1990 7	AEL	1–2	AEK Athens	Larissa
14:45 EET (UTC+2)	Valaoras 23'; Nasiakos (yellow card) 30'		Karagiannis (yellow card) 25'; Christodoulou (yellow card) 30'; Okoński 50'; Goumas 82'	Stadium: Alcazar Stadium; Attendance: 8,352; Referee: Dimitris Naoum (Thessaloniki)

25 November 1990 8	AEK Athens	1–2	Panathinaikos	Nea Filadelfeia
14:45 EEST (UTC+3)	Manolas (yellow card); Vasilopoulos (yellow card); Patikas 38'; Manolas (red card) 77'		L. Christodoulou (yellow card); Lupu (yellow card); Warzycha 8'; Saravakos 67', (yellow card)	Stadium: AEK Stadium; Attendance: 21,716; Referee: Stavros Zakestidis (Thessaloniki)

2 December 1990 9	Panionios	0–3	AEK Athens	Nea Smyrni
14:45 EET (UTC+2)	Tzanetis (yellow card); Magalhães (yellow card); Michos (yellow card) 54'; Coraș (penalty missed) 63'		Chatzis (yellow card); Klopas (yellow card); Karagiozopoulos 55' (pen.); Minou (yellow card) 62'; Batista 65'; Patikas 90'	Stadium: Nea Smyrni Stadium; Attendance: 4,031; Referee: Giorgos Bikas (Chalkidiki)

9 December 1990 10	AEK Athens	0–1	PAS Giannina	Nea Filadelfeia
14:45 EET (UTC+2)			Skoutas (yellow card); Oikonomou (yellow card); L. Papaioannou 81'	Stadium: AEK Stadium; Attendance: 9,053; Referee: Stratos Kannos (Athens)

16 December 1990 11	AEK Athens	2–0	Ionikos	Nea Filadelfeia
14:45 EET (UTC+2)	Papaioannou (yellow card); Vasilopoulos (yellow card); Milopoulos 18', 62'		Tsiolis (yellow card); Papadopoulos (yellow card); Kalogeropoulos (yellow card); Mandraflis (yellow card)	Stadium: AEK Stadium; Attendance: 7,346; Referee: Sotiris Vorgias (Athens)

23 December 1990 12	PAOK	1–1	AEK Athens	Thessaloniki
14:45 EET (UTC+2)	Malioufas (yellow card); Mitsibonas 24'		Manolas (yellow card); Klopas (yellow card); Karagiozopoulos (yellow card); Chatzis (yellow card); Batista 43'	Stadium: Toumba Stadium; Attendance: 13,782; Referee: Nikos Vournelis (Thessaloniki)

30 December 1990 13	AEK Athens	1–1	Apollon Athens	Nea Filadelfeia
14:45 EET (UTC+2)	Georgiadis 8'; Peppes (yellow card) 14'; Papaioannou (yellow card) 45'		Karasavvidis 3'; Athanasiadis (yellow card) 58'; Kourkounas (yellow card) 83'	Stadium: AEK Stadium; Attendance: 11,623; Referee: Sotiris Bazas (Phthiotis)

6 January 1991 14	Panachaiki	0–2	AEK Athens	Patras
14:45 EET (UTC+2)	Majearu (yellow card); Papadopoulos (yellow card)		Klopas (yellow card); Patikas 1'; Savvidis 83'	Stadium: Panachaiki Stadium; Attendance: 7,588; Referee: Giorgos Giannopoulos (Athens)

6 February 1991 15	AEK Athens	1–0	Olympiacos	Rhodes
14:45 EET (UTC+2)	Peppes (yellow card) 33'; Batista 90+1'			Stadium: Diagoras Stadium; Attendance: 4,220; Referee: Christos Kolokythas (Athens)
Note: Replay match of the game that took place on 13 January at AEK Stadium and was abandoned at the 84th minute, while the score was 1–2, due to tear gas that suffocated the atmosphere and the serious incidents that took place outside the stadium.

27 January 1991 16	Iraklis	0–1	AEK Athens	Thessaloniki
14:45 EET (UTC+2)	Vakalopoulos (yellow card) 71'; Bonovas (yellow card) 75'		Karagiozopoulos (yellow card) 1'; Vasilopoulos (yellow card) 19'; Patikas (red card) 70'; Okoński 72'	Stadium: Kaftanzoglio Stadium; Attendance: 5,477; Referee: Giannis Iatropoulos (Piraeus)

3 February 1991 17	AEK Athens	3–0	Doxa Drama	Nea Filadelfeia
14:45 EET (UTC+2)	Klopas 28', 85'; Georgiadis 59'		Vasilakakis (yellow card); Michalitsos (yellow card)	Stadium: AEK Stadium; Attendance: 2,640; Referee: Nikos Andreou (Athens)

10 February 1991 18	AEK Athens	3–1	OFI	Nea Filadelfeia
15:00 EET (UTC+2)	Manolas 3'; Klopas 43'; Patikas 70'		Tsinos (yellow card); Andreanidis (yellow card); Vera 41'	Stadium: AEK Stadium; Attendance: 11,177; Referee: Alexandros Naziris (Thessaloniki)

17 February 1991 19	Xanthi	2–0	AEK Athens	Xanthi
15:00 EET (UTC+2)	Baniotis (yellow card) (yellow-red card) 69'; Tzatzos (yellow card); Giourgousis (yellow card); Kostenoglou (yellow card) (yellow-red card) 73'; Chatzimoisiadis 3'; Marcelo 8'		Klopas (yellow card)	Stadium: A.O. Xanthi Stadium; Attendance: 6,977; Referee: Giorgos Giannopoulos (Athens)

24 February 1991 20	AEK Athens	4–1	Aris	Nea Filadelfeia
15:15 EET (UTC+2)	Batista 7'; Karagiozopoulos 43' (pen.), 57' (pen.); Savevski 70'		Ziogas 63'	Stadium: AEK Stadium; Attendance: 5,711; Referee: Kostas Dimitriadis (Piraeus)

3 March 1991 21	Athinaikos	1–0	AEK Athens	Vyronas
15:15 EET (UTC+2)	Tzalakostas 86'			Stadium: Vyronas National Stadium; Attendance: 4,029; Referee: Thanasis Syrmakezis (Larissa)

10 March 1991 22	AEK Athens	3–1	Levadiakos	Nea Filadelfeia
15:15 EET (UTC+2)	Okoński 8'; Karagiozopoulos 21', (yellow card) 10'; Savvidis 26'; Batista (yellow card) 82'		Petkov 11'; Lazarou (yellow card) 67'	Stadium: AEK Stadium; Attendance: 5,890; Referee: Kostas Vrailas (Athens)

17 March 1991 23	Panserraikos	1–0	AEK Athens	Serres
15:30 EET (UTC+2)	Konstantinidis (yellow card); Stoev 60' (pen.)			Stadium: Serres Municipal Stadium; Attendance: 4,723; Referee: Nikos Filippiadis (Thessaloniki)

24 March 1991 24	AEK Athens	5–2	AEL	Nea Filadelfeia
15:15 EET (UTC+2)	Manolas 10', (red card) 37'; Savevski 51', 57'; Kyrilidis 60' (o.g.); Savvidis 69'		Tsoukalis (yellow card); Papantoniou (yellow card); Vasilopoulos 32' (o.g.); Dankowski (red card) 64'; Petkov 75'	Stadium: AEK Stadium; Attendance: 8,526; Referee: Kostas Kortsaris (Thessaloniki)

31 March 1991 25	Panathinaikos	4–0	AEK Athens	Marousi
16:30 EEST (UTC+3)	Apostolakis 7', 51'; Kalantzis 34'; Warzycha 55'			Stadium: Olympic Stadium; Attendance: 31,642; Referee: Stavros Zakestidis (Thessaloniki)

7 April 1991 26	AEK Athens	1–0	Panionios	Nea Filadelfeia
16:30 EEST (UTC+3)	Savvidis 21'; Batista (penalty missed) 78'		Kapouranis (yellow card)	Stadium: AEK Stadium; Attendance: 3,726; Referee: Theodoros Kefalas (Athens)

14 April 1991 27	PAS Giannina	1–1	AEK Athens	Ioannina
16:30 EEST (UTC+3)	Lappas (yellow card); Ziakas (yellow card); Van Wijk 54' (pen.)		Vasilopoulos (yellow card); Karagiozopoulos (yellow card); Patikas 76', (yellow card)	Stadium: Zosimades Stadium; Attendance: 4,597; Referee: Naoum Mintiouris (Serres)

21 April 1991 28	Ionikos	1–1	AEK Athens	Nikaia
16:30 EEST (UTC+3)	Doxakis (yellow card); Bechlivanidis (yellow card); Vogiatzis 27'		Karagiozopoulos (yellow card); Savevski 44'	Stadium: Neapoli Municipal Stadium; Attendance: 4,996; Referee: Giorgos Bikas (Chalkidiki)

28 April 1991 29	AEK Athens	0–0	PAOK	Nea Filadelfeia
16:30 EEST (UTC+3)	Karagiannis (yellow card) 6' (yellow-red card) 74'; Vasilopoulos (yellow card) 83'		Mitsibonas (yellow card) 10'; Gitsioudis (yellow card) 44'	Stadium: AEK Stadium; Attendance: 10,454; Referee: Giorgos Giannopoulos (Athens)

5 May 1991 30	Apollon Athens	2–5	AEK Athens	Rizoupoli
16:30 EEST (UTC+3)	Karasavvidis 7' (pen.); Vlachos (yellow card) 52'; Jevtović (red card) 55'; Athanasiadis 59'		Batista 28'; Famelis 45', 49', (yellow card) 52'; Stamatis (penalty missed) 79'; Milopoulos 87'; Savevski 90+1'	Stadium: Rizoupoli Stadium; Attendance: 5,571; Referee: Giorgos Bikas (Chalkidiki)

12 May 1991 31	AEK Athens	3–2	Panachaiki	Nea Filadelfeia
17:00 EEST (UTC+3)	Manolas 40'; Batista 53'; Savvidis 60'		Zerdevas (yellow card); Genas 19'; Ottiji 66'	Stadium: AEK Stadium; Attendance: 7,314; Referee: Kostas Adamopoulos (Athens)

19 May 1991 32	Olympiacos	3–1	AEK Athens	Piraeus
17:00 EEST (UTC+3)	Pachatouridis (yellow card); Protasov 14' (pen.); Savichev 56'; Lytovchenko 88' (pen.)		Papaioannou (yellow card); Manolas 55'	Stadium: Karaiskakis Stadium; Attendance: 23,226; Referee: Dimitris Naoum (Thessaloniki)

26 May 1991 33	AEK Athens	4–0	Iraklis	Nea Filadelfeia
17:00 EEST (UTC+3)	Karagiannis (yellow card) 26'; Batista 35', 45', 56', (yellow card) 39', (penalty missed) 59'; Savvidis 61'		Tachtsidis (yellow card) 24'; Jovanović (yellow card) 78'	Stadium: AEK Stadium; Attendance: 8,980; Referee: Vasilis Kougios (Dodecanese)

2 June 1991 34	Doxa Drama	2–0	AEK Athens	Drama
17:00 EEST (UTC+3)	Papatheodorou (yellow card); Aleksić (yellow card); Oistampasidis 59' (pen.); G. Georgiadis 88'		Karagiozopoulos (yellow card)	Stadium: Doxa Drama Stadium; Attendance: 4,274; Referee: Vasilis Kougios (Dodecanese)

=== Greek Cup ===
==== Group 9 ====
Pos	Team	Pld	W	D	L	GF	GA	GD	Pts	Qualification	AEK	PAR	AEM	PRE
1	AEK Athens	3	3	0	0	10	1	+9	6	Round of 32		1–0	5–1	—
2	Panarkadikos	3	1	1	1	3	1	+2	3	Round of 32	—		2–0	—
3	AE Mesolongi	3	1	0	2	7	2	+5	2		—	—		1–0
4	Preveza	3	0	1	2	1	6	−5	1		0–4	1–1	—	

Source: epo.gr

==== Matches ====
26 August 1990 1	AEK Athens	5–1	AE Mesolongi	Nea Filadelfeia
21:00 EEST (UTC+3)	Patikas 15'; Batista 34'; Karagiozopoulos 53' (pen.); Goumas 60'; Savevski 66'	Report	Tzatzos 86' (pen.)	Stadium: AEK Stadium; Attendance: 3,000; Referee: Giorgos Koukoulas (Lesbos)

29 August 1990 2	AEK Athens	1–0	Panarkadikos	Nea Filadelfeia
21:00 EEST (UTC+3)	Christodoulou 43'	Report		Stadium: AEK Stadium; Attendance: 2,630; Referee: Giorgos Plevritis (Thessaloniki)

2 September 1990 3	Preveza	0–4	AEK Athens	Preveza
10:30 EEST (UTC+3)	Paliatsos (yellow card) 9'; Charisis (yellow card) 52'		Goumas 6'; Christodoulou 26'; Klopas 43'; Pangratis 82'	Stadium: Preveza Municipal Stadium; Attendance: 1,844; Referee: Kostas Vrailas (Athens)

===== Round of 32 =====
5 December 1990 First leg	Charavgiakos	0–3	AEK Athens	Ilioupoli
14:45 EET (UTC+2)	Mistriotis (yellow card)	Report	Savevski 46', 85'; Christodoulou 54', (yellow card)	Stadium: Ilioupoli Municipal Stadium; Attendance: 1,265; Referee: Ilias Doutsias (Piraeus)

9 January 1991 Second leg	AEK Athens	2–0 (5–0 agg.)	Charavgiakos	Nea Filadelfeia
14:15 EET (UTC+2)	Karagiozopoulos 39' (pen.); Milopoulos 86'	Report	Gialesakis (yellow card); Krousouloudis (yellow card)	Stadium: AEK Stadium; Attendance: 1,162; Referee: Giorgos Giannopoulos (Athens)

===== Round of 16 =====
30 January 1991 First leg	OFI	3–0	AEK Athens	Heraklion
14:45 EET (UTC+2)	Stamatis 15' (o.g.); Vlastos 27'; Patemtzis 65'	Report	Karagiozopoulos (yellow card) 64'; Goumas (yellow card) 89'	Stadium: Theodoros Vardinogiannis Stadium; Attendance: 5,415; Referee: Periklis Vasilakis (Athens)

20 February 1991 Second leg	AEK Athens	3–1 (3–4 agg.)	OFI	Nea Filadelfeia
14:45 EET (UTC+2)	Georgiadis (yellow card); Okoński 6'; Savevski 41'; Manolas 78'	Report	Tsimpos (yellow card); Goulis (yellow card); Tsinos (yellow card); Delgado (yellow card) , (goal) 20'	Stadium: AEK Stadium; Attendance: 8,000; Referee: Theodoros Kefalas (Athens)

== Statistics ==
=== Squad statistics ===
As of 2 June 1991

No.	Pos	Player	Alpha Ethniki		Greek Cup		Total	
No.	Pos	Player	Apps	Goals	Apps	Goals	Apps	Goals
Goalkeepers
—	GK	(Greece) Antonis Minou	32	0	4	0	36	0
—	GK	(Greece) Spyros Ikonomopoulos	2	0	1	0	3	0
—	GK	(Greece) Fanis Kofinas	0	0	2	0	2	0
Defenders
—	DF	(Greece) Makis Chatzis	6	0	5	0	11	0
—	DF	(Greece) Takis Karagiozopoulos	29	5	6	2	35	7
—	DF	(Greece) Stelios Manolas	24	4	3	1	27	5
—	DF	(Greece) Giorgos Peppes	14	0	5	0	19	0
—	DF	(Greece) Christos Vasilopoulos	30	0	1	0	31	0
—	DF	(Greece) Georgios Koutoulas	3	0	0	0	3	0
—	DF	(Greece) Vaios Karagiannis	23	0	6	0	29	0
—	DF	(Greece) Anastasios Pourikas	1	0	3	0	4	0
Midfielders
—	MF	(Poland) Mirosław Okoński	18	3	3	1	21	4
—	MF	(Greece) Pavlos Papaioannou	28	0	2	0	30	0
—	MF	(Cyprus) Giorgos Savvidis	19	9	3	0	22	9
—	MF	(Greece) Lampros Georgiadis	26	2	5	0	31	2
—	MF	(Socialist Federal Republic of Yugoslavia) Toni Savevski	34	7	5	4	39	11
—	MF	(Australia) Jim Patikas	24	5	4	1	28	6
—	MF	(Greece) Stavros Stamatis	13	0	3	0	16	0
—	MF	(Greece) Giorgos Famelis	24	2	4	0	28	2
—	MF	(Greece) Panagiotis Pangratis	0	0	2	1	2	1
—	MF	(Greece) Giorgos Papakostoulis	6	0	4	0	10	0
Forwards
—	FW	(Cape Verde) Daniel Batista	31	13	4	1	35	14
—	FW	(Greece) Giannis Milopoulos	13	3	3	1	16	4
—	FW	(United States) Frank Klopas	20	4	4	1	24	5
—	FW	(Greece) Georgios Christodoulou	11	0	5	3	16	3
—	FW	(Greece) Spyros Goumas	3	1	3	2	6	3

=== Goalscorers ===
As of 2 June 1991
The list is sorted by competition order when total goals are equal, then by position and then alphabetically by surname.

Rank	Pos.	Player	Alpha Ethniki	Greek Cup	Total
1	FW	(Cape Verde) Daniel Batista	13	1	14
2	MF	(Socialist Federal Republic of Yugoslavia) Toni Savevski	7	4	11
3	MF	(Cyprus) Giorgos Savvidis	9	0	9
4	DF	(Greece) Takis Karagiozopoulos	5	2	7
5	MF	(Australia) Jim Patikas	5	1	6
6	DF	(Greece) Stelios Manolas	4	1	5
6	FW	(United States) Frank Klopas	4	1	5
8	MF	(Poland) Mirosław Okoński	3	1	4
8	FW	(Greece) Giannis Milopoulos	3	1	4
10	FW	(Greece) Spyros Goumas	1	2	3
10	FW	(Greece) Georgios Christodoulou	0	3	3
12	MF	(Greece) Giorgos Famelis	2	0	2
12	MF	(Greece) Lampros Georgiadis	2	0	2
14	MF	(Greece) Panagiotis Pangratis	0	1	1
Own goals			1	0	1
Totals			59	18	77

=== Hat-tricks ===
Numbers in superscript represent the goals that the player scored.

Player	Against	Result	Date	Competition	Source
(Cyprus) Giorgos Savvidis	(Greece) Xanthi	6–0 (H)	23 September 1990	Alpha Ethniki	
(Cape Verde) Daniel Batista	(Greece) Iraklis	4–0 (H)	26 May 1991	Alpha Ethniki	

=== Clean sheets ===
As of 2 June 1991
The list is sorted by competition order when total clean sheets are equal and then alphabetically by surname. Clean sheets in games where both goalkeepers participated are awarded to the goalkeeper who started the game. Goalkeepers with no appearances are not included.

Rank	Player	Alpha Ethniki	Greek Cup	Total
1	(Greece) Antonis Minou	13	2	15
2	(Greece) Spyros Ikonomopoulos	0	1	1
3	(Greece) Fanis Kofinas	0	1	1
Totals		13	4	17

=== Disciplinary record ===
As of 2 June 1991

N	P	Nat.	Name	Alpha Ethniki			Greek Cup			Total			Notes
N	P	Nat.	Name	Yellow card	Second yellow card	Red card	Yellow card	Second yellow card	Red card	Yellow card	Second yellow card	Red card	Notes
Goalkeepers
—	GK	(Greece)	Antonis Minou	1						1			
—	GK	(Greece)	Spyros Ikonomopoulos										
—	GK	(Greece)	Fanis Kofinas										
Defenders
—	DF	(Greece)	Makis Chatzis	2						2			
—	DF	(Greece)	Takis Karagiozopoulos	7			1			8			
—	DF	(Greece)	Stelios Manolas	3		1				3		1	
—	DF	(Greece)	Giorgos Peppes	2						2			
—	DF	(Greece)	Christos Vasilopoulos	7						7			
—	DF	(Greece)	Georgios Koutoulas										
—	DF	(Greece)	Vaios Karagiannis	4	1					4	1		
—	DF	(Greece)	Anastasios Pourikas										
Midfielders
—	MF	(Poland)	Mirosław Okoński	1						1			
—	MF	(Greece)	Pavlos Papaioannou	6		1				6		1	
—	MF	(Cyprus)	Giorgos Savvidis										
—	MF	(Greece)	Lampros Georgiadis	1			1			2			
—	MF	(Socialist Federal Republic of Yugoslavia)	Toni Savevski										
—	MF	(Australia)	Jim Patikas	1		1				1		1	
—	MF	(Greece)	Stavros Stamatis										
—	MF	(Greece)	Giorgos Famelis	2						2			
—	MF	(Greece)	Panagiotis Pangratis										
—	MF	(Greece)	Giorgos Papakostoulis	1						1			
Forwards
—	FW	(Cape Verde)	Daniel Batista	2						2			
—	FW	(Greece)	Giannis Milopoulos										
—	FW	(United States)	Frank Klopas	4						4			
—	FW	(Greece)	Georgios Christodoulou	1			1			2			
—	FW	(Greece)	Spyros Goumas				1			1			

=== Starting 11 ===
This section presents the most frequently used formation along with the players with the most starts across all competitions.

N.	Formation	Matchday(s)
39	4–4–2	1, 4–34
2	3–4–3	2, 3

Nat.	Player	Pos.
(Greece)	Antonis Minou	GK
(Greece)	Stelios Manolas	RCB
(Greece)	Takis Karagiozopoulos	LCB
(Greece)	Christos Vasilopoulos	RB
(Greece)	Lampros Georgiadis	LB
(Greece)	Pavlos Papaioannou (C)	DM
(Socialist Federal Republic of Yugoslavia)	Toni Savevski	CM
(Cyprus)	Giorgos Savvidis	RM
(Australia)	Jim Patikas	LM
(United States)	Frank Klopas	SS
(Cape Verde)	Daniel Batista	CF

Last updated: 1991-06-02
