= 1987 Greek Football Cup final =

1987 Greek Cup final
- Event: 1986–87 Greek Football Cup
Iraklis	OFI
1	1
- After extra time OFI won 3–1 on penalties
- Date: 21 June 1987
- Venue: Olympic Stadium, Marousi, Athens
- Referee: Meletis Voutsaras (Athens)
- Attendance: 23,587

The 1987 Greek Cup final was the 43rd final of the Greek Cup. The match took place on 21 June 1987 at the Olympic Stadium. The contesting teams were Iraklis and OFI. It was Iraklis' fifth Greek Cup final in their 79 years of existence and OFI's first ever Greek Cup final in their 62-year history. Myron Sifakis the third-choice at the time goalkeeper of OFI emerged as the hero of his team, saving two penalties during the penalty shoot-out.

== Venue ==
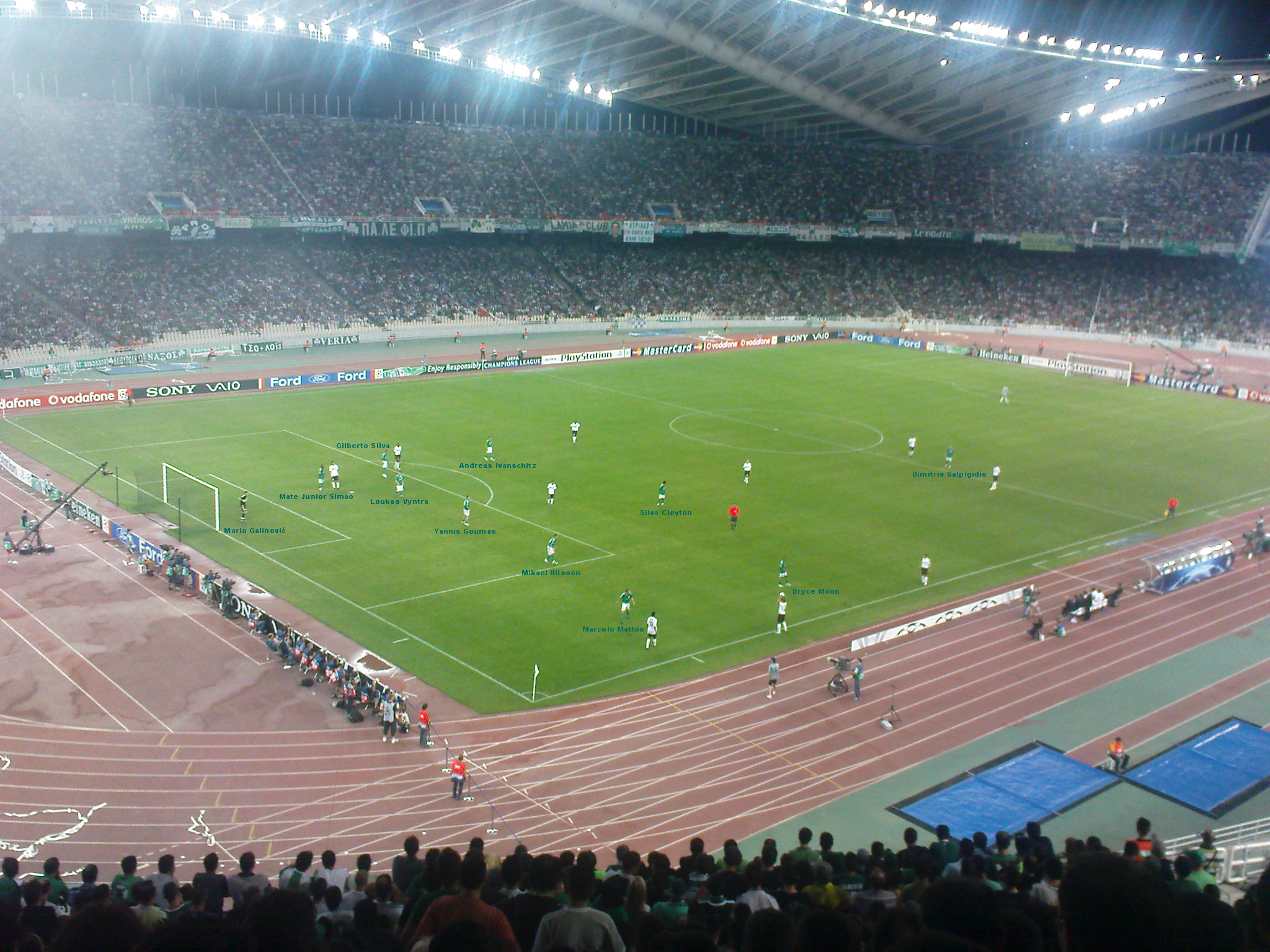
Athens Olympic Stadium.

This was the fifth Greek Cup final held at the Athens Olympic Stadium, after the 1983, 1984, 1985 and 1986 finals.

The Athens Olympic Stadium was built in 1982. The stadium is used as a venue for Panathinaikos, Olympiacos, AEK Athens and Greece. Its current capacity is 80,000 and hosted a European Cup final in 1983 and a European Cup Winners' Cup final in 1987.

== Background ==
Iraklis had reached the Greek Cup final four times, winning one of them. The last time that they won the Cup was in 1976 (6–5 on penalties, which came after a 4–4 draw at the end of the extra time against Olympiacos). The last time that they played in a final was in 1980, where they had lost to Kastoria by 5–2.

OFI had never competed in a Cup final.

The two teams had never met each other in a Cup final.

== Route to the final ==
Iraklis				Round	OFI			
Opponent	Agg.	1st leg	2nd leg		Opponent	Agg.	1st leg	2nd leg
Kavala	1–1 (4–3 p) (A)			First round	Thiva	2–0 (H)		
Bye				Additional round	Bye			
Polykastro	4–0	3–0 (H)	1–0 (A)	Round of 32	Edessaikos	4–2	3–0 (H)	1–2 (A)
Kozani	9–2	5–0 (H)	4–2 (A)	Round of 16	Apollon Athens	4–1	4–0 (H)	0–1 (A)
AEL	2–1	1–1 (A)	1–0 (H)	Quarter-finals	Kallithea	6–0	2–0 (A)	4–0 (H)
Panathinaikos	3–2	0–0 (H)	3–2 (A)	Semi-finals	Diagoras	5–1	2–0 (A)	3–1 (H)

== Match ==
=== Details ===
21 June 1987
21:00 EEST

Iraklis	1–1 (a.e.t.)	OFI
Kofidis 30'	Report	Charalampidis 34'
Penalties
Sundby (penalty missed); Zifkas (penalty missed); D. Papadopoulos (penalty scored); Adamou (penalty missed)	1–3	(penalty scored) Charalampidis; (penalty scored) Tsinos; (penalty scored) Papavasiliou

Olympic Stadium, Marousi
Attendance: 23,587
Referee: Meletis Voutsaras (Athens)

Iraklis	OFI

GK	(Socialist Federal Republic of Yugoslavia) Blanko Georgiev
DF	(Greece) Tasos Lefkopoulos
DF	(Greece) Christos Zifkas
DF	(Greece) Pagonis Vakalopoulos
DF	(Greece) Kostas Iliadis
MF	(Greece) Savvas Kofidis (c)
MF	(Greece) Daniil Papadopoulos
MF	(Greece) Sakis Anastasiadis
MF	(Greece) Giorgos Karaiskos	(substituted off) 57'
MF	(Greece) Vasilis Hatzipanagis	(substituted off) 98'
FW	(Norway) Tom Sundby
Substitutes:
GK	(Greece) Fotis Gizelis
DF	(Greece) Giorgos Papadopoulos	(substituted on) 57'
FW	(Greece) Kostas Maloumidis
FW	(Greece) Fanis Toutziaris
FW	(Greece) Dimitris Adamou	(substituted on) 98'
Manager:
(Greece) Christos Archontidis

GK	(Greece) Myron Sifakis
DF	(Greece) Nikos Goulis
DF	(Greece) Christos Vasiliou
DF	(Greece) Grigoris Tsinos
DF	(Greece) Giannis Michalitsos	(substituted off) 102'
DF	(Chile) Alejandro Hisis
MF	(Greece) Takis Persias (c)
MF	(Greece) Grigoris Papavasiliou
MF	(Greece) Nikos Nioplias	(substituted off) 94'
FW	(Greece) Giannis Samaras
FW	(Greece) Grigoris Charalampidis
Substitutes:
GK	(Greece) Vangelis Chosadas
DF	(Greece) Nikos Tsimpos
MF	(Greece) Miltos Andreanidis	(substituted on) 102'
FW	(Greece) Georgios Vlastos
FW	(Greece) Christos Kariotis	(substituted on) 94'
Manager:
(Netherlands) Eugène Gerards

Assistant referees:
Dimitris Daoulas (Aetoloacarnania)
Giorgos Bikas (Chalkidiki)

Match rules

- 90 minutes
- 30 minutes of extra time if necessary
- Penalty shootout if scores still level
- Five named substitutes
- Maximum of two substitutions

== See also ==
- 1986–87 Greek Football Cup
