= 1987 Greek Super Cup =

Olympiacos	OFI
1	0
- Date: 29 August 1987
- Venue: Olympic Stadium, Marousi, Athens
- Referee: Makis Germanakos (Athens)

The 1987 Greek Super Cup was the 2nd edition of the Greek Super Cup and the 1st that was organized under the HFF, an association football match contested by the winners of the previous season's Alpha Ethniki and Greek Cup competitions. The match took place on 29 August 1987 at the Athens Olympic Stadium. The contesting teams were the 1986–87 Alpha Ethniki champions, Olympiacos and the 1986–87 Greek Cup winners, OFI. Olympiacos won the match 1–0.

== Venue ==
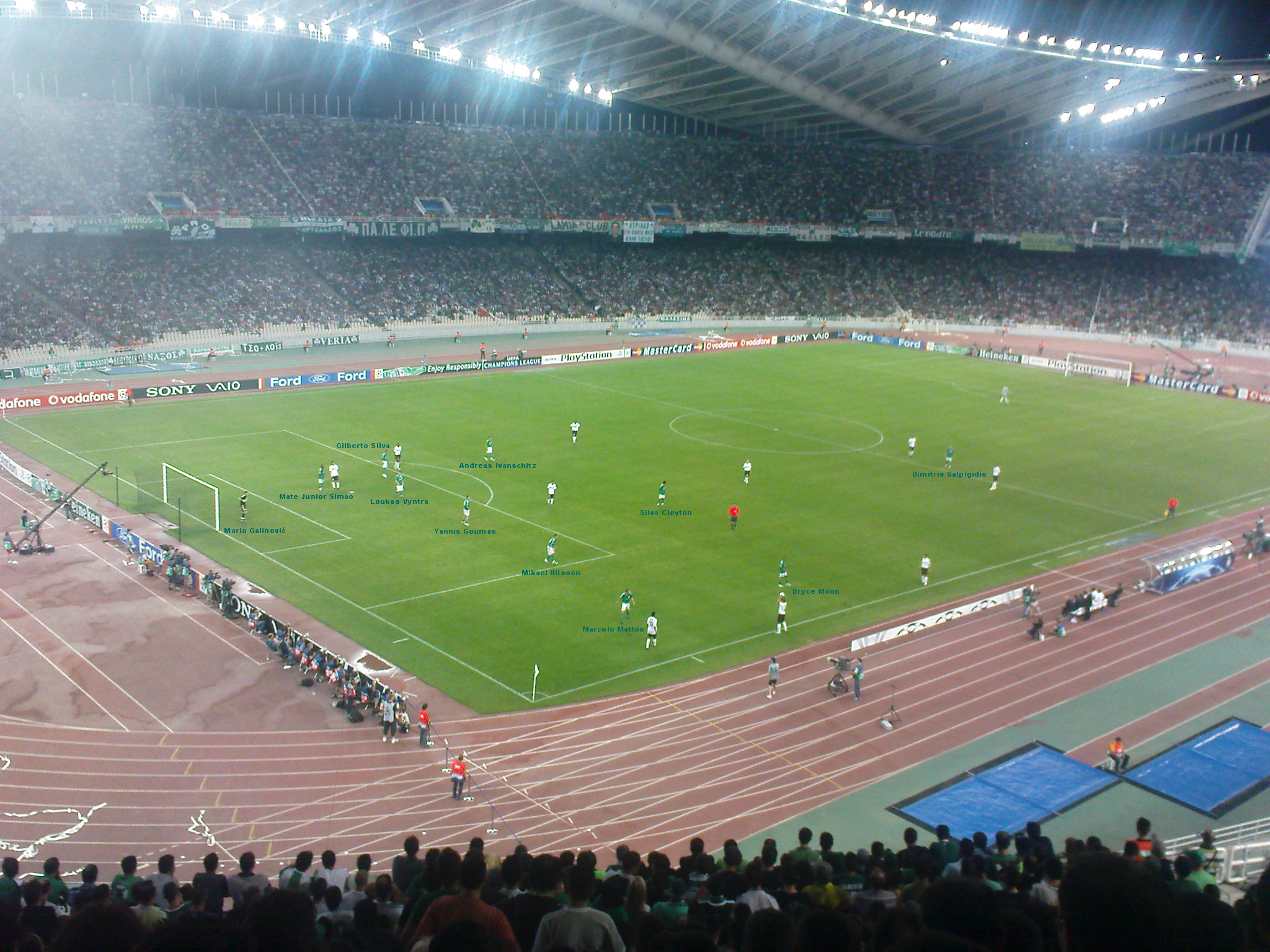
Athens Olympic Stadium.

This was the first Greek Super Cup held at the Athens Olympic Stadium.

The Athens Olympic Stadium was built in 1982. The stadium is used as a venue for Panathinaikos, Olympiacos and Greece and was used for AEK Athens in various occasions. Its current capacity is 80,000 and hosted a European Cup final in 1983 and a European Cup Winners' Cup final in 1987.

== Background ==
Olympiacos participated in the Greek Super Cup one time in 1980, where they had won Kastoria by 4–3.

OFI had never competed in the Greek Super Cup.

The two teams had never met each other in the Super Cup.

== Match ==
=== Details ===
29 August 1987
21:30 EEST (UTC+3)

Olympiacos	1–0	OFI
Xanthopoulos 65'	Report

Olympic Stadium, Marousi
Referee: Makis Germanakos (Athens)

Olympiacos	OFI

GK	1	(Poland) Jacek Kazimierski
RB	3	(Greece) Stratos Apostolakis
CB	4	(Greece) Alexandros Alexiou
CB	5	(Greece) Petros Michos
LB	8	(Greece) Giorgos Kapouranis
DM	2	(Greece) Petros Xanthopoulos (c)
CM	6	(Greece) Andreas Bonovas
CM	9	(Greece) Christos Pseftis
AM	10	(Greece) Tasos Mitropoulos	(yellow card) 83'	(substituted off) 86'
CF	7	(Greece) Theodoros Zelilidis
CF	11	(Greece) Georgios Kostikos		(substituted off) 81'
Substitutes:
GK	15	(Greece) Giannis Papamichail
DF	12	(Greece) Giannis Papatheodorou		(substituted on) 86'
MF	14	(Greece) Vasilios Papachristou		(substituted on) 81'
Manager:
(Greece) Alketas Panagoulias

GK	1	(Greece) Vangelis Chosadas	(yellow card)
RB	2	(Greece) Manolis Patemtzis		(substituted off) 67'
CB	3	(Greece) Nikos Goulis
CB	4	(Greece) Grigoris Tsinos	(yellow card) 67'
CB	5	(Greece) Giannis Michalitsos
LB	7	(Chile) Alejandro Hisis	(yellow card) 83'
DM	6	(Greece) Miltos Andreanidis
CM	8	(Greece) Grigoris Papavasiliou (c)
AM	10	(Greece) Nikos Nioplias
CF	11	(Greece) Giannis Samaras
CF	9	(Greece) Grigoris Charalampidis		(substituted off) 81'
Substitutes:
DF	12	(Greece) Nikos Tsimpos		(substituted on) 67'
FW		(Greece) Giannis Marinakis		(substituted on) 81'
Manager:
(Netherlands) Eugène Gerards

Assistant referees:
Stratos Kannos (Athens)
Kostas Dimitriadis (Piraeus)

Match rules

- 90 minutes
- 30 minutes of extra time if necessary
- Penalty shootout if scores still level
- Five named substitutes
- Maximum of two substitutions
