= 1980 Greek Football Cup final =

1980 Greek Cup final
- Event: 1979–80 Greek Football Cup
Iraklis	Kastoria
2	5
- Date: 25 May 1980
- Venue: AEK Stadium, Nea Filadelfia, Athens
- Referee: Vasilis Vourakis (Piraeus)
- Attendance: 9,471

The 1980 Greek Cup final was the 36th final of the Greek Cup. The match took place on 25 May 1980 at Nikos Goumas Stadium. The contesting teams were Iraklis and Kastoria. It was Iraklis' fourth Greek Cup final in their 72 years of existence and Kastoria's first ever Greek Cup final in their 17-year history. Iraklis on their way to the final, faced their local rivals PAOK on the semi-finals. Before the second leg, there was an alleged bribe attempt by Iraklis on the footballer of PAOK, Filotas Pellios. Due to those charges, Iraklis were eventually relegated to the second division, despite the prescribed penalty being the exclusion from next year's Cup. The allegations were later proven false, but the relegation decision was not overturned. With their conquest of the Cup, Kastoria became the first club that was not based in neither Attica or Thessaloniki to win the trophy, while at the same time ensured their only participation in the next season's Cup Winners' Cup.

== Venue ==
This was the fifth Greek Cup final held at AEK Stadium, after the 1962, 1967, 1974 and 1976 finals.

AEK Stadium was built in 1930 and it has been renovated in 1979. The stadium is used as a venue for AEK Athens and was used for Greece on various occasions. Its current capacity is 35,000.

== Background ==
Iraklis had reached the Greek Cup final three times, winning one of them. The last time that they played in a final was in 1976, where they had won Olympiacos by 6–5 on penalties, which came after a 4–4 draw at the end of the extra time.

Kastoria had never competed in a Cup final.

The two teams had never met each other in a Cup final.

== Route to the final ==
Iraklis				Round	Kastoria			
Opponent	Agg.	1st leg	2nd leg		Opponent	Agg.	1st leg	2nd leg
Veria	7–0 (H)			First round	Ethnikos Piraeus	1–0 (a.e.t.) (A)		
Niki Volos	5–0 (A)			Second round	Kavala	2–0 (H)		
Almopos Aridea	2–1 (A)			Round of 16	Olympiakos Loutraki	5–1 (A)		
Panarkadikos	1–0	1–0 (H)	0–0 (A)	Quarter-finals	AEL	2–1	1–0 (H)	1–1 (A)
PAOK	2–1	1–0 (A)	1–1 (H)	Semi-finals	Makedonikos	4–1	2–0 (H)	2–1 (A)

== Match ==
=== Details ===
25 May 1980
21:00 EEST

Iraklis	2–5	Kastoria
Kalabakas 14' (pen.); Mavrodoulakis 80'	Report	Simeoforidis 40'; Dintsikos 49'; Tsironis 69', 87', 90+1' (pen.)

AEK Stadium, Nea Filadelfia
Attendance: 9,471
Referee: Vasilis Vourakis (Piraeus)

GK	1	(Greece) Tasos Papadopoulos
DF	2	(Greece) Vasilis Voulgaris
DF	4	(Greece) Giannis Mavrodoulakis		(substituted off) 81'
DF	5	(Greece) Georgios Michailidis	(red card) 54'
DF	3	(Poland) Henryk Wawrowski
MF	6	(Greece) Charalampos Xanthopoulos
MF	10	(Greece) Tasos Kafkenaris
MF	8	(Greece) Ilias Chatzieleftheriou		(substituted off) 70'
MF	7	(Greece) Nikos Kalabakas
MF	11	(Greece) Vasilis Hatzipanagis
FW	9	(Greece) Lakis Papaioannou
Substitutes:
MF	14	(Greece) Vangelis Tsirikas		(substituted on) 70'
FW	16	(Greece) Ilias Alexiadis		(substituted on) 81'
Manager:
(Greece) Kostas Karapatis

GK	1	(Greece) Nikos Sarganis	(substituted off) 88'
DF	2	(Greece) Lazaros Alexiadis
DF	3	(Greece) Giannis Siapanidis
DF	6	(Greece) Georgios Paraschos (c)
DF	5	(Greece) Lakis Simeoforidis
MF	4	(Greece) Antonis Kopanos
MF	10	(Greece) Grigoris Papavasiliou
MF	8	(Greece) Argyris Papavasiliou
FW	7	(Greece) Giannis Dintsikos	(substituted off) 72'
FW	9	(Greece) Andreas Voitsidis
FW	11	(Greece) Dimitris Tsironis
Substitutes:
GK	15	(Greece) Thanasis Ermidis	(substituted on) 88'
FW		(Greece) Georgios Chounouzidis	(substituted on) 72'
Manager:
(Greece) Savvas Vasiliadis

Assistant referees:
Kostas Dedes (Messinia)
Antonis Vassaras (Thessaloniki)

Match rules

- 90 minutes
- 30 minutes of extra time if necessary
- Penalty shootout if scores still level
- Five named substitutes
- Maximum of two substitutions

== See also ==
- 1979–80 Greek Football Cup
