= Makis =

Makis is a Greek masculine given name and nickname which may refer to:

- Mavroeidis Makis Angelopoulos (born 1964), Greek businessman and co-owner of the basketball team AEK Athens
- Λιναρδάτος Γεράσιμος (Μάκης), μαθητής Γ4
- Makis Belevonis (born 1975), Greek former footballer
- Gerasimos Makis Dendrinos (1950–2015), Greek basketball player and coach
- Prodromos Makis Dreliozis (born 1975), Greek retired basketball player
- Makis Giannikoglou (born 1993), Greek football goalkeeper
- Gerasimos Makis Giatras (born 1971), Greek basketball coach
- Iacovos Makis Keravnos (born 1951), Cypriot banker and politician
- Prodromos Makis Nikolaidis (born 1978), Greek-Cypriot former basketball player
- Makis Papadimitriou, Greek actor
- Makis Papaioannou (born 1977), Cypriot former footballer
- Makis Solomos (born 1962), Franco-Greek musicologist
- Efthimios Makis Triantafyllopoulos (born 1954), Greek journalist and publisher
- Makis Tsitas (born 1971), Greek writer
- Kosmas Makis Tzatzos (born 1968), Greek retired footballer
- Mavroudis Makis Voridis (born 1964), Greek politician and lawyer
- Makis Voukelatos (born 1998), Greek footballer
