= 1986–87 Greek Football Cup =

1986–87 Greek Cup
Tournament details
- Country: Greece
- Teams: 76

Final positions
- Champions: OFI (1st title)
- Runners-up: Iraklis

Tournament statistics
- Matches played: 105
- Goals scored: 290 (2.76 per match)

The 1986–87 Greek Football Cup was the 45th edition of the Greek Football Cup.

== Tournament details ==
A total of 76 teams participated, 16 from Alpha Ethniki, 20 from Beta, and 40 from Gamma. It was held in 7 rounds, the final included. An additional round was held between first and second, with 6 matches, in order for the continuing teams to be 32.

The big surprise of the season was Panionios. After a difficult qualification against Charavgiakos in the first round, they proceeded to eliminate giants AEK Athens, PAOK and Olympiacos. They were eventually eliminated by Panathinaikos in the quarter-finals.

The final was contested by OFI, for first time in their history, and Iraklis after 7 years, with the latter having qualificatied against Panathinaikos in semi-finals. The final match was decided on the penalty shoot-out after a 1–1 draw. The "hero" for the winners was their goalkeeper, Myron Sifakis, who saved two penalties. What is even more impressive is that he was the third-choice goalkeeper, behind Mitseas and Chosadas.

Grigoris Papavasiliou also became the only player to win the Cup with three different clubs, after winning it with Kastoria in 1980 and Panathinaikos in 1984.

== Calendar ==
Round	Date(s)	Fixtures	Clubs	New entries
First Round	19 November 1986	38	76 → 38	76
Additional Round	17 December 1986	6	38 → 32	none
Round of 32	1987	32	32 → 16	none
Round of 16	1987	16	16 → 8	none
Quarter-finals	8, 22 April 1987	8	8 → 4	none
Semi-finals	6, 27 May 1987	4	4 → 2	none
Final	21 June 1987	1	2 → 1	none

== Knockout phase ==
Each tie in the knockout phase, apart from the first two rounds and the final, was played over two legs, with each team playing one leg at home. The team that scored more goals on aggregate over the two legs advanced to the next round. If the aggregate score was level, the away goals rule was applied, i.e. the team that scored more goals away from home over the two legs advanced. If away goals were also equal, then extra time was played. The away goals rule was again applied after extra time, i.e. if there were goals scored during extra time and the aggregate score was still level, the visiting team advanced by virtue of more away goals scored. If no goals were scored during extra time, the winners were decided by a penalty shoot-out. In the first two rounds and the final, which were played as a single match, if the score was level at the end of normal time, extra time was played, followed by a penalty shoot-out if the score was still level.
The mechanism of the draws for each round is as follows:

- There are no seedings, and teams from the same group can be drawn against each other.

== First round ==
Team 1	Score	Team 2
Eordaikos	1–0	Rodos
Panarkadikos	3–1	Atromitos
Alexandreia	0–0 (5–6 p)	Proodeftiki
Kozani	4–2	Aiolikos
Egaleo	1–0	Naoussa
Kalamata	1–2	Aris
Kavala	1–1 (3–4 p)	Iraklis
Panserraikos	0–1	Panathinaikos
Anagennisi Giannitsa	1–0	Agrotikos Asteras
Niki Volos	0–2	Anagennisi Karditsa
Panionios	2–0 (a.e.t.)	Charavgiakos
Thriamvos Athens	4–0	Xanthi
Ethnikos Asteras	2–0	Paniliakos
Athinaikos	1–2	Ethnikos Piraeus
Polykastro	3–0	Ergotelis
Achilleas Farsala	1–1 (2–4 p)	Irodotos
OFI	2–0	Thiva
Panargiakos	1–2	Pyrsos Grevena
Doxa Drama	3–1	Kastoria
Ionikos	2–1 (a.e.t.)	Pierikos
AEL	1–0	Levadiakos
Megas Alexandros Alexandria	1–2	Acharnaikos
PAS Giannina	1–1 (2–4 p)	Diagoras
Peramaikos	0–1	Panetolikos
Kallithea	1–0	Trikala
Apollon Athens	4–0	Kerkyra
Anagennisi Arta	6–0	Panthrakikos
A.F.C. Patra	3–1	Pannafpliakos
Olympiacos Volos	0–1	AEK Athens
Kilkisiakos	1–1 (3–5 p)	Apollon Kalamarias
Fostiras	0–2	PAOK
APE Langadas	0–3	Edessaikos
Veria	4–2	Nestos Chrysoupoli
Olympiakos Chalkida	2–1	Chalkida
Panachaiki	4–1	Vyzas Megara
Ethnikos Alexandroupoli	1–4	Olympiacos
Panelefsiniakos	0–3	Makedonikos
Korinthos	1–1 (4–3 p)	Lamia

== Additional round ==
Team 1	Score	Team 2
Ethnikos Piraeus	1–2	Olympiacos
Irodotos	3–2	Eordaikos
Egaleo	2–0	Anagennisi Karditsa
Proodeftiki	2–1	Panetolikos
Panionios	1–0 (a.e.t.)	AEK Athens
Anagennisi Arta	1–2 (a.e.t.)	Aris

== Bracket ==
Round of 32
Korinthos	0	1	1
Aris	1	6	7
AEL	3	1	3
Egaleo	0	0	0
Iraklis	4	1	4
Polykastro	0	0	0
Ethnikos Asteras	2	0	2
Kozani	0	3	3
Ionikos	0	1	1
Doxa Drama	1	4	5
Panathinaikos	4	3	7
Veria	1	1	2
Panionios	3	0	3
PAOK	0	1	1
Acharnaikos	3	0	3
Olympiacos	3	3	6
A.F.C. Patra	0	1	1
Panachaiki	3	1	4
Apollon Kalamarias	0	1	1
Diagoras	1	3	4
Thriamvos Athens	0	1	1
Pyrsos Grevena	0	2	2
Makedonikos	2	3	5
Irodotos	0	3	3
Proodeftiki	2	0	2
Kallithea (a)	1	1	2
Anagennisi Giannitsa	5	1	6
Olympiakos Chalkida	1	2	3
OFI	3	1	4
Edessaikos	0	2	2
Panarkadikos	2	0	2
Apollon Athens	0	3	3

Round of 16
Aris	2	0	2
AEL	0	3	3
Iraklis	5	4	9
Kozani	0	2	2
Doxa Drama	0	0	0
Panathinaikos	1	2	3
Panionios	3	0	3
Olympiacos	0	1	1
Panachaiki	2	0	2
Diagoras (a.e.t.)	0	3	3
Pyrsos Grevena	0	0	0
Makedonikos	4	5	9
Kallithea	3	1	4
Anagennisi Giannitsa	0	2	2
OFI	4	0	4
Apollon Athens	0	1	1

Quarter-finals
AEL	1	0	1
Iraklis	1	1	2
Panathinaikos	3	0	3
Panionios	1	1	2
Diagoras (a)	0	1	1
Makedonikos	0	1	1
Kallithea	0	0	0
OFI	2	4	6

Semi-finals
Iraklis	0	3	3
Panathinaikos	0	2	2
Diagoras	0	1	1
OFI	2	3	5

Final
Iraklis	1(1)
OFI (p)	1(3)

== Round of 32 ==
Team 1	Agg.	Team 2	1st leg	2nd leg
Proodeftiki	2–2 (a)	Kallithea	2–1	0–1
Panionios	3–1	PAOK	3–0	0–1
Korinthos	1–7	Aris	0–1	1–6
A.F.C. Patra	1–4	Panachaiki	0–3	1–1
Makedonikos	5–3	Irodotos	2–0	3–3
OFI	4–2	Edessaikos	3–0	1–2
Panarkadikos	2–3	Apollon Athens	2–0	0–3
Ethnikos Asteras	2–3	Kozani	2–0	0–3
Iraklis	4–0	Polykastro	3–0	1–0
AEL	3–0	Egaleo	3–0	0–0
Apollon Kalamarias	1–4	Diagoras	0–1	1–3
Thriamvos Athens	1–2	Pyrsos Grevena	0–0	1–2
Anagennisi Giannitsa	6–3	Olympiakos Chalkida	5–1	1–2
Acharnaikos	3–6	Olympiacos	3–3	0–3
Panathinaikos	7–2	Veria	4–1	3–1
Ionikos	1–5	Doxa Drama	0–1	1–4

== Round of 16 ==
Team 1	Agg.	Team 2	1st leg	2nd leg
Aris	2–3	AEL	2–0	0–3
Iraklis	9–2	Kozani	5–0	4–2
Doxa Drama	0–3	Panathinaikos	0–1	0–2
Panionios	3–1	Olympiacos	3–0	0–1
OFI	4–1	Apollon Athens	4–0	0–1
Panachaiki	2–3	Diagoras	2–0	0–3 (a.e.t.)
Pyrsos Grevena	0–9	Makedonikos	0–4	0–5
Kallithea	4–2	Anagennisi Giannitsa	3–0	1–2

== Quarter-finals ==
Team 1	Agg.	Team 2	1st leg	2nd leg
Panathinaikos	3–2	Panionios	3–1	0–1
Kallithea	0–6	OFI	0–2	0–4
Diagoras	(a) 1–1	Makedonikos	0–0	1–1
AEL	1–2	Iraklis	1–1	0–1

== Semi-finals ==
Team 1	Agg.	Team 2	1st leg	2nd leg
Iraklis	3–2	Panathinaikos	0–0	3–2
Diagoras	1–5	OFI	0–2	1–3

== Final ==
21 June 1987
21:00 EEST

Iraklis	1–1 (a.e.t.)	OFI
Kofidis 30'	Report	Charalampidis 34'
Penalties
Sundby (penalty missed); Zifkas (penalty missed); D. Papadopoulos (penalty scored); Adamou (penalty missed)	1–3	(penalty scored) Charalampidis; (penalty scored) Tsinos; (penalty scored) Papavasiliou

Olympic Stadium, Marousi
Attendance: 23,587
Referee: Meletis Voutsaras (Athens)
