= Pre-Mediterranean Cup =

Προμεσογειακό Κύπελλο Pre-Mediterranean Cup
- Founded: 1991
- Abolished: 1991
- Region: Greece
- Teams: 16
- Last champions: AEK Athens (1st title)
- Most championships: AEK Athens (1 title)

The Pre-Mediterranean Cup (Greek: Προμεσογειακό Κύπελλο) was an association football tournament hosted by the HFF. It was a friendly tournament that was held for financial purposes. Its name occurred from the fact that it took place before the start of the 1991 Mediterranean Games. The competition was conducted once, in 1991 and the winners were AEK Athens.

In June 1991, the Pre-Mediterranean Cup was held in order to financially support mainly the clubs that competed in the Alpha Ethniki. The clubs that declared their participation had expectations from the ticket sales and would receive a 32.5% of the revenues from PRO-PO, as well. It was conducted with the participation of the 1990–91 Alpha Ethniki clubs, plus the 1990–91 Beta Ethniki champion, Ethnikos Piraeus. Nevertheless, Olympiacos, Panathinaikos and PAOK did not participate, due to the fatigue of their footballers from the constant league games. The tournament had duration of two matchdays that took place within a week. The club with the most points would win the Cup. In case of a tie, the goal difference criterion was applied. The end of tournament found AEK Athens, Levadiakos and Doxa Drama tied at the top with 4 points each, having won both of their matches. According to the regulation, AEK Athens, who had the best goal difference (6–2), emerged as the winners.

The point system was: Win: 2 points - Draw: 1 point - Loss: 0 points.

== Fixtures ==
=== 1st ===
9 June 1991
17:00 EEST

Ethnikos Piraeus	2–1	Panachaiki
Mellas 20'; Xanthis 50'	Report	Psarras 57' (pen.)

Karaiskakis Stadium, Piraeus
Attendance: 704
Referee: Kostas Vrailas (Athens)

9 June 1991
17:30 EEST

Iraklis	0–2	Aris
	Report	Charalampidis 39'; Gioukoudis 81'

Aris Stadium, Thessaloniki
Attendance: 1,000
Referee: Dimitris Naoum (Thessaloniki)

9 June 1991
17:30 EEST

Apollon Athens	0–1	Athinaikos
	Report	Kolev 65' (pen.)

Aigaleo Stadium, Aigaleo
Attendance: 220
Referee: Sotiris Vorgias (Athens)

9 June 1991
17:30 EEST

Levadiakos	2–1	AEL
Loukas 31'; Kavalieris 33'	Report	Tsapatoris 43' (pen.)

Volos Municipal Stadium, Volos
Attendance: 300
Referee: Nikos Vournelis (Thessaloniki)

9 June 1991
17:30 EEST

Ionikos	2–2	Xanthi
Spanos 23', 80'	Report	Marcelo 21'; Pappas 57'

AEK Stadium, Nea Filadelfeia
Attendance: 152
Referee: Ilias Doutsias (Piraeus)

9 June 1991
17:30 EEST

PAS Giannina	1–2	Panionios
Tsiavos 45'	Report	Lagonikakis 44'; Michos 70'

Ioannina National Stadium, Ioannina
Referee: Dimitris Bentas (Trikala)

9 June 1991
17:30 EEST

AEK Athens	5–2	OFI
Famelis 2'; Manolas 43'; Patikas 49'; Milopoulos 58', 66'	Report	Machlas 21'; Goulis 80'

Rizoupoli Stadium, Rizoupoli
Attendance: 2,000
Referee: Giannis Iatropoulos (Piraeus)

10 June 1991
17:30 EEST

Doxa Drama	3–2	Panserraikos
Iordanidis 5'; Aleksić 73'; Alexandridis 84' (pen.)	Report	Karabelas 66'; Gekas 82' (pen.)

Doxa Drama Stadium, Drama
Attendance: 1,000
Referee: Kostas Kortsaris (Thessaloniki)

=== 2nd ===
16 June 1991
17:30 EEST

Xanthi	0–1	Doxa Drama
	Report	G.S. Georgiadis 64'

A.O. Xanthi Stadium, Xanthi
Referee: Naoum Mintiouris (Serres)

16 June 1991
17:30 EEST

Panachaiki	1–3	Levadiakos
Myrtsos 53'	Report	Kasapis 21'; Pechlevanidis 60'; Tsanas 83'

AEK Stadium, Nea Filadelfeia
Attendance: 114
Referee: Periklis Vasilakis (Athens)

16 June 1991
17:30 EEST

Panionios	1–3	Ionikos
Lagonikakis 62' (pen.)	Report	Daraklitsas 15'; Spanos 74', 90'

Karaiskakis Stadium, Piraeus
Attendance: 340
Referee: Theodoros Kefalas (Athens)

16 June 1991
16:30 EEST

OFI	0–0	Apollon Athens
	Report

Theodoros Vardinogiannis Stadium, Heraklion
Referee: Giorgos Koukoulakis (Heraklion)

16 June 1991
17:30 EEST

Aris	2–2	AEL
Moustakidis 69'; Samolis 85'	Report	Konstantinidis 57'; Zermas 62'

Makedonikos Stadium, Thessaloniki
Referee: Periklis Vasilakis (Athens)

16 June 1991
17:30 EEST

Panserraikos	2–5	Iraklis
Chavos 34'; Gekas 59' (pen.)	Report	Athanasiadis 17' (o.g.); Facincani 53'; Tachtsidis 57'; Tsamfiloglou 85', 87'

Serres Municipal Stadium, Serres
Referee: Giorgos Plevritis (Thessaloniki)

16 June 1991
17:30 EEST

Ethnikos Piraeus	0–1	PAS Giannina
	Report	Tatsis 78'

Rizoupoli Stadium, Rizoupoli
Attendance: 260
Referee: Kostas Adamopoulos (Athens)

16 June 1991
17:30 EEST

Athinaikos	0–1	AEK Athens
	Report	Milopoulos 11'

Ilioupoli Municipal Stadium, Ilioupoli
Attendance: 2,000
Referee: Kostas Dimitriadis (Piraeus)

== Table ==
Pos	Team	Pld	W	D	L	GF	GA	GD	Pts
1	AEK Athens (C)	2	2	0	0	6	2	+4	4
2	Levadiakos	2	2	0	0	5	2	+3	4
3	Doxa Drama	2	2	0	0	4	2	+2	4
4	Ionikos	2	1	1	0	5	3	+2	3
5	Aris	2	1	1	0	4	2	+2	3
6	Iraklis	2	1	0	1	5	4	+1	2
7	Ethnikos Piraeus	2	1	0	1	3	3	0	2
8	PAS Giannina	2	1	0	1	2	2	0	2
9	Athinaikos	2	1	0	1	1	1	0	2
10	Panionios	2	1	0	1	3	4	−1	2
11	AEL	2	0	1	1	3	4	−1	1
12	Xanthi	2	0	1	1	2	3	−1	1
13	Apollon Athens	2	0	1	1	0	1	−1	1
14	OFI	2	0	1	1	2	5	−3	1
15	Panachaiki	2	0	0	2	2	5	−3	0
16	Panserraikos	2	0	0	2	4	8	−4	0

Source: newspapers: Athletic Echo, Eleftheros Typos, Apogevmatini
(C) Champions

== Top scorers ==
Rank	Player	Club	Goals
1	(Greece) Dimitrios Spanos	Ionikos	4
2	(Greece) Giannis Milopoulos	AEK Athens	3
3	(Greece) Andreas Lagonikakis	Panionios	2
3	(Greece) Stelios Tsamfiloglou	Iraklis	2
3	(Greece) Michalis Gekas	Panserraikos	2
6	(Greece) Mellas	Ethnikos Piraeus	1
6	(Greece) Vasilios Xanthis	Ethnikos Piraeus	1
6	(Greece) Giannis Psarras	Panachaiki	1
6	(Greece) Stavros Charalampidis	Aris	1
6	(Greece) Antonis Gioukoudis	Aris	1
6	(Bulgaria) Hristo Kolev	Athinaikos	1
6	(Greece) Andreas Loukas	Levadiakos	1
6	(Greece) Michalis Kavalieris	Levadiakos	1
6	(Greece) Dimitris Tsapatoris	AEL	1
6	(Brazil) Marcelo Veridiano	Xanthi	1
6	(Greece) Christos Pappas	Xanthi	1
6	(Greece) Nikos Tsiavos	PAS Giannina	1
6	(Greece) Petros Michos	Panionios	1
6	(Greece) Giorgos Famelis	AEK Athens	1
6	(Greece) Stelios Manolas	AEK Athens	1
6	(Australia) Jim Patikas	AEK Athens	1
6	(Greece) Nikos Machlas	OFI	1
6	(Greece) Nikos Goulis	OFI	1
6	(Greece) Michalis Iordanidis	Doxa Drama	1
6	(Serbia) Miroslav Aleksić	Doxa Drama	1
6	(Greece) Kyriakos Alexandridis	Doxa Drama	1
6	(Greece) Giorgos Karabelas	Panserraikos	1
6	(Greece) Georgios Savvas Georgiadis	Doxa Drama	1
6	(Greece) Michalis Kasapis	Levadiakos	1
6	(Kazakhstan) Evstaphiy Pechlevanidis	Levadiakos	1
6	(Greece) Kostas Tsanas	Levadiakos	1
6	(Greece) Giorgos Myrtsos	Panachaiki	1
6	(Greece) Georgios Daraklitsas	Ionikos	1
6	(Greece) Dimitris Konstantinidis	AEL	1
6	(Greece) Andreas Zermas	AEL	1
6	(Greece) Babis Moustakidis	Aris	1
6	(Greece) Evripidis Samolis	Aris	1
6	(Greece) Makis Chavos	Panserraikos	1
6	(Brazil) Denys Luctke Facincani	Iraklis	1
6	(Greece) Giannis Tachtsidis	Iraklis	1
6	(Greece) Giannis Tatsis	PAS Giannina	1

== Bibliography ==
- Αλεξανδρής, Γ.Χ. (1996). Η Ιστορία της ΑΕΚ (in Greek). Αθήνα, Ελλάδα: Ιδιωτική Έκδοση Γ.Χ. Αλεξανδρής.
- Συλλογικό έργο (2014). 90 ΧΡΟΝΙΑ, Η ΙΣΤΟΡΙΑ ΤΗΣ ΑΕΚ (in Greek). Αθήνα, Ελλάδα: Εκδοτικός Οίκος Α. Α. Λιβάνη. ISBN 978-960-14-2802-4.
- Παναγιωτακόπουλος, Παναγιώτης (2022). 1979-2003 ΤΟ ΤΑΞΙΔΙ ΣΥΝΕΧΙΖΕΤΑΙ...Νο2 (in Greek). Αθήνα, Ελλάδα: ISBN 978-618-00-3993-1.
