= Georgios Athanasiadis =

Georgios Athanasiadis may refer to:

- Georgios Athanasiadis-Novas (1893–1987), Greek politician and former Prime Minister of Greece
- Georgios Athanasiadis (footballer, born 1963), Greek footballer
- Georgios Athanasiadis (footballer, born 1993), Greek footballer
- Georgios Athanasiadis (wrestler) (born 1962), Greek wrestler
