= Georgios Paraschos =

Greek footballer and manager

Giorgos Paraschos
Personal information
- Full name: Georgios Paraschos
- Date of birth: 23 August 1952 (age 74)
- Place of birth: Thessaloniki, Greece
- Height: 1.81 m (5 ft 11 in)
- Position: Midfielder

Youth career
- 1967–1971: PAOK

Senior career*
Years	Team	Apps	(Gls)
1971–1974	PAOK	10	(0)
1974–1983	Kastoria	294	(8)
1983–1984	Apollon Kalamarias	12	(0)
Total		316	(8)

International career
1977–1980	Greece	4	(0)

Managerial career
- 1989–1992: Kastoria
- 1993–1994: Trikala
- 1994–1995: Anagennisi Karditsa
- 1995–1997: Kavala
- 1997–1998: Iraklis
- 1998: APOEL
- 1998–1999: Aris
- 1999–2000: Kavala
- 2000: PAS Giannina
- 2001: Paniliakos
- 2001: Olympiacos Volos
- 2002: Akratitos
- 2002–2007: Atromitos
- 2007: PAOK
- 2007–2008: OFI
- 2008–2009: Skoda Xanthi
- 2009: OFI
- 2009–2010: Panionios
- 2010: PAS Giannina
- 2010: Skoda Xanthi
- 2010: Panionios
- 2011: Iraklis
- 2011–2013: Levadiakos
- 2013–2014: Atromitos
- 2015–2017: Platanias
- 2017–2018: Apollon Smyrnis
- 2018–2019: Asteras Tripolis
- 2019–2020: Xanthi
- 2020–2021: Apollon Smyrnis
- 2021: Atromitos
- * Club domestic league appearances and goals

Georgios Paraschos (Greek: Γεώργιος Παράσχος; born 23 August 1952) is a Greek professional football manager and former player.

== Playing career ==
=== Club ===
Paraschos began his career from the youth academy of PAOK in 1967. He became a professional player in 1971 and played with the Kastoria team until 1985, making appearances for the club in the Alpha Ethniki. He most prominently captained Kastoria to a shock win over the flamboyant and heavily favoured side Iraklis Thessaloniki in the 1980 Greek Cup final.

=== International ===
Paraschos had four caps for with Greece between 1977 and 1980.

== Managerial career ==
As a coach, Paraschos started in 1985, but as an amateur, in 1989 he coached Kastoria (2nd Division) until 1992. After that he coached teams such as: Trikala, Anagenissi Karditsa, Kavala, Iraklis, APOEL, Aris, PAS Giannina, Paniliakos, Niki Volos, Akratitos, PAOK, Skoda Xanthi and Chalkidona (which later merged into Atromitos). On 31 January 2011 he replaced Marinos Ouzounidis as manager of Iraklis.

=== Managerial statistics ===
Managerial record by team and tenure
Team	From	To	Record				
Team	From	To	P	W	D	L	Win %
Kastoria	11 July 1989	4 July 1992	115	36	33	46	31.3
Trikala	2 July 1993	20 June 1994	37	15	12	10	40.5
Anagennisi Karditsa	16 July 1994	12 July 1995	43	21	10	12	48.8
Kavala	28 July 1995	18 June 1997	75	40	16	19	53.3
Iraklis Thessaloniki	18 July 1997	10 April 1998	37	17	7	13	45.9
APOEL	2 August 1998	14 December 1998	15	10	2	3	66.7
Aris	15 December 1998	22 April 1999	14	7	0	7	50.0
Kavala	2 December 1999	20 June 2000	25	7	4	14	28.0
PAS Giannina	27 July 2000	12 January 2001	27	10	9	8	37.0
Paniliakos	2 February 2001	6 April 2001	9	2	2	5	22.2
Olympiacos Volou	25 September 2001	28 November 2001	8	2	2	4	25.0
Akratitos	10 February 2002	12 June 2002	12	4	2	6	33.3
Chalkidona Atromitos	7 September 2002	9 January 2007	155	66	36	53	42.6
PAOK	14 January 2007	3 September 2007	14	6	2	6	42.9
OFI	16 November 2007	28 May 2008	26	9	5	12	34.6
Skoda Xanthi	18 September 2008	1 March 2009	27	9	11	7	33.3
PAS Giannina	4 August 2009	6 December 2009	14	3	5	6	21.4
Panionios	3 February 2010	25 April 2010	12	3	5	4	25.0
OFI	27 April 2010	27 June 2010	9	5	3	1	55.6
Skoda Xanthi	20 September 2010	7 November 2010	7	1	2	4	14.3
Panionios (Caretaker)	8 November 2010	15 November 2010	1	0	0	1	0.0
Iraklis Τhessaloniki	31 January 2011	15 June 2011	10	2	6	2	20.0
Levadiakos	28 August 2011	22 March 2013	63	23	13	27	36.5
Atromitos	8 April 2013	22 September 2014	62	32	17	13	51.6
Platanias	22 March 2015	31 October 2017	91	35	25	31	38.5
Apollon Smyrnis	12 December 2017	23 May 2018	16	4	6	6	25.0
Asteras Tripolis	12 Νοvember 2018	17 May 2019	29	13	7	9	44.8
Xanthi	8 December 2019	6 March 2020	15	2	5	8	13.3
Apollon Smyrnis	2 September 2020	16 March 2021	28	9	4	15	32.1
Atromitos*	25 September 2021	19 December 2021	13	2	2	9	15.4
Total			1,009	395	253	361	39.1

- includes a game against PAOK (2–0 win) in which Paraschos wasn't present because he was tested positive to COVID-19.

== Honours ==
- Greek Football Cup: 1980 with Kastoria

== See also ==
- List of football managers with the most matches
