= Myron Sifakis =

Greek footballer and manager

Personal information
- Full name: Myron Sifakis
- Date of birth: 28 September 1960 (age 66)
- Place of birth: Zaros, Crete, Greece
- Position: Goalkeeper

Youth career
- Atsalenios

Senior career*
| Years | Team | Apps | (Gls) |
| –1986 | Atsalenios | | |
| 1986–1991 | OFI | 25 | (0) |
| 1992–1993 | Pierikos | 19 | (0) |
| 1993–1996 | Panetolikos | | |
| 1996–1997 | Agios Nikolaos | | |

Managerial career
- 1997–1999: Agios Nikolaos
- 1999−2001: Ergotelis
- 2001: Almyros Gazi
- 2001−2005: Ergotelis
- 2005: Ethnikos Achna
- 2005–2006: Niki Volos
- 2006: OFI
- 2006: Niki Volos
- 2007–2008: Panetolikos
- 2008: Egaleo
- 2009: OFI (assistant)
- 2010−2011: Antagoras Kos
- 2011–2012: Rouvas
- 2013−2014: P.A.O. Krousonas
- 2017: AEEK INKA
- 2018–2019: P.A.O. Krousonas
- * Club domestic league appearances and goals

Myron Sifakis (Greek: Μύρων Σηφάκης; born 28 September 1960) is a Greek retired goalkeeper and current football manager.

== Career ==
=== Playing career ===
Sifakis began his football career at his local side Atsalenios. He was then transferred to Heraklion's Alpha Ethniki side OFI, where he spent 7 years during the club's "golden age". Despite being used mostly as the third-choice goalkeeper, behind Georgios Mitseas and Vangelis Chosadas, Sifakis rose to the occasion when he was called-up by coach Eugène Gerards to defend OFI's goal during the 1986–87 Greek Cup Final, in which he warded off two shots during the penalty shootout, for which his club claimed their first ever major trophy.

After leaving OFI in 1992, Sifakis moved to fellow Alpha Ethniki side, Pierikos, where he suffered relegation at the end of the season. He then dropped to lower Greek divisions, playing for Panetolikos and Agios Nikolaos, where he retired in 1997, to pursue a managerial career.

=== Managerial career ===
Still in his playing years with Agios Nikolaos, Sifakis served as interim coach for the club during the final match-day of the 1996−97 Gamma Ethniki, after multiple managerial changes for the season. He reached an agreement with the club to retire his playing career in 1997 and started managing the club, earning promotion to the Beta Ethniki in his first season as manager. He managed the club until December 1999, when he terminated his contract on mutual consent.

Shortly after leaving Agios Nikolaos, Sifakis was hired by fellow Cretan Delta Ethniki side Ergotelis. He achieved a 2nd-place finish in his first season, and narrowly missed out on promotion to the Gamma Ethniki during the 2000−01 season. Consequently, he decided not to renew his contract with the club after it expired on 31 May 2001. His absence however proved to be brief, as he was re-appointed in November 2001 after the sudden resignation of his substitute coach Pavlos Dermitzakis. His second tenure was marked by unprecedented success in club history, as he managed to lead Ergotelis to three consecutive promotions, from the 4th tier to the Alpha Ethniki for the first time in club history. Sifakis managed the club during a difficult 2004−05 top-flight season, where a string of unsuccessful results and rising tensions with the club's board of directors after a 0−1 home loss vs. his former playing club OFI led to his sacking on 4 April 2005.

In the summer of 2005, Sifakis moved to Cyprus, taking over management of Cypriot First Division club Ethnikos Achna. His tenure was deemed unsuccessful however, and he was replaced in December. A few weeks later, he signed with Niki Volos in the Beta Ethniki, but resigned in February 2006 to take over management of a struggling OFI in the Alpha Ethniki. As a manager, he achieved another milestone for OFI, as he became the first manager to win on his debut in 24 years. Furthermore, he narrowly managed to avoid what seemed like an inevitable, historic relegation for the club when he took over, recording 17 points on the League Table, boasting a 5−2−4 record and winning the crucial decisive final match vs. fellow relegation contenders Levadiakos on 14 May 2006. Despite a relatively successful tenure however, the club decided to replace him in the summer of 2006.

In September 2006, Sifakis returned to Niki Volos and the Beta Ethniki, but unsuccessful results and administrative problems led him to resign in December 2006. He then took over management of Gamma Ethniki side Panetolikos. Sifakis then briefly returned to the Beta Ethniki, first by taking over Egaleo, where he was sacked after failing to improve their position on the League Table. Afterwards he returned to OFI, where he was paired up with former OFI teammate "Nikki" Papavasiliou to lead the club during its 2009–10 Beta Ethniki campaign, but the duo was sacked after poor performances at the start of the competition. He since has moved to manage clubs in lower regional and national divisions, including Antagoras Kos, Rouvas, whom he promoted to the Gamma Ethniki for the first time in their history, P.A.O. Krousonas, and most recently AEEK INKA in 2017.

In January 2018, Sifakis returned to OFI, being offered the position of general manager. He was relieved of his duties later that year and in September, Sifakis returned to coaching, taking over management of local A1 side P.A.O. Krousonas. He was sacked from his post in January 2019.

== Personal ==
Sifakis' sons Michalis and Vasilis are also a goalkeepers, Michalis having enjoyed relative success in his career as a goalkeeper for Olympiacos and Aris, while also having been capped for Greece 15 times.

== Honours ==
=== As player ===
OFI

- Greek Cup: 1986–87
