= Eugène Gerards =

Dutch footballer, manager, and scout (1940–2018)

Personal information
- Full name: Eugène Marie Gerards
- Date of birth: 7 May 1940
- Place of birth: Brunssum, Netherlands
- Date of death: 2 January 2018 (aged 77)
- Place of death: Elia, Heraklion, Greece
- Height: 1.83 m (6 ft 0 in)
- Position: Striker

Senior career*
| Years | Team | Apps | (Gls) |
| 1957–1963 | Limburgia | 129 | (48) |
| 1963–1967 | Fortuna '54 | 89 | (15) |
| 1967–1971 | Limburgia | 106 | (9) |
| Total | | 324 | (72) |

Managerial career
- 1974–1985: Roda (assistant)
- 1984: Roda (caretaker)
- 1985–2000: OFI
- 2001–2002: APOEL
- 2002–2003: Iraklis
- 2010: Panachaiki
- * Club domestic league appearances and goals

Eugène Gerards (7 May 1940 − 2 January 2018) was a Dutch football player, manager and scout. As a player, Gerards played for Limburgian clubs SV Limburgia and Fortuna '54. As a manager, he spent the majority of his career in Greece, where he acquired the Greek citizenship. He became the longest serving manager in Greek football, serving at the bench of OFI for 15 years.

== Club career ==
Gerards began his career at Limburgia as a defender-turned-striker in 1957. In 1963 he moved to Fortuna '54, before returning to Limburgia in 1967. He followed the club to amateur competitions in 1971 and retired in 1974. Gerards was a member of the Dutch national military team, as well as the Netherlands national under-21 football team. Despite being called-up for the Netherlands national football team by manager Denis Neville in 1964, Gerards made no senior national appearances.

== Managerial career ==
=== Roda JC ===
Still in his playing years, Gerards attended the German Sport University Cologne, earning various German managerial certificates. In 1974, he received his "Fußballehrer", highest professional football manager certificate in Germany, while working as municipality ambassador for Brunssum. Immediately after retirement as a player in May 1974, Gerards signed a contract as assistant manager for Dutch football club Roda JC, where he was also appointed manager of the club's youth team. He held his position for the Kerkrade-based club for 12 years, serving under head managers Bert Jacobs (1974–1980), Piet de Visser (1980–1983), Hans Eijkenbroek (1983–1984) and Frans Körver (1984–1986). During the last managerial change, Gerards replaced Eijkenbroek as interim manager for a single game in December 1984, before returning to his post under arriving manager Frans Körver for the remainder of the 1984−85 season.

=== OFI ===
At the start of the 1985−86 season, Gerards assumed his first job as manager for an ambitious Greek Alpha Ethniki side OFI. The club had recently been acquired by the rich and prestigious Vardinogiannis family, who also were the major shareholders of Athens-based regular Greek champions, Panathinaikos. Former Roda JC midfielder Grigoris Tsinos played for OFI at the time and suggested to name Gerards as their new manager.

At OFI, Gerards set an outstanding record for both the club as well as Greek football in general, as he remained the team's manager for 15 consecutive years, which to this day remains the longest managerial tenure in Greek football history. This feat was also paired with a string of successful domestic and European campaigns for the Cretan club, which constitute OFI's "golden years". In 1986, OFI finished in 2nd place in the Alpha Ethniki, trailing five points behind Panathinaikos, which still marks the best finish the club has ever made in the competition. In his first season with the club, Gerards had turned OFI into a serious competitor for traditional Greek football "giants" Panathinaikos, AEK Athens, Olympiacos and PAOK. In 1987, Gerards led the club to its first major honour, winning the Greek Football Cup in a penalty shoot-out against Iraklis during the competition Final. He came close to repeat this feat in 1990, but OFI were defeated in the Final by eventual Cup winners Olympiacos. During his 15 years with the club, Gerards qualified OFI six times for European competitions, winning one Balkans Cup in 1989, and advancing OFI through to the UEFA Cup Round of 16 during the 1993−94 edition of the competition, most notably eliminating Spanish club Atlético Madrid in the process.

During Gerards' tenure as manager at OFI, several of the club's players were transferred out to prestigious European clubs. Among others, Gerards nurtured the talents of Nikos Machlas, Kostas Konstantinidis, Alexis Alexoudis, Dănuț Lupu, Yannis Anastasiou, Mahamadou Diarra, Kostas Kiassos and Ioannis Samaras.

The 1999−2000 season was his last as manager at OFI. He was honored by the club for his longtime services, and was subsequently offered the position of chief scout and football advisor. However, in November 2000 he was surprisingly fired from his position, as the club's board of directors decided his presence was causing trouble for the club's new manager, former player Ioannis Samaras.

=== Later career ===
In January 2001, Gerards accepted the position of technical director at AEK Athens until the end of the season. There, he worked as a duo with their captain who had turned into a manager overnight, Toni Savevski He then revived his managerial career at Cypriot First Division side APOEL Nicosia, winning the Cypriot Championship in his first season with the club. He stayed at APOEL until 2002, and moved back to Greece as the new appointed manager of Alpha Ethniki side Iraklis. After two seasons, Gerards decided in 2004 to retire as football manager and re-assumed his role as technical director and scout at AEK Athens, a position he held until 2009. He regularly organized football camps in Greece to discover new talents and has been linked to several key players to have emerged during his tenure as scout.

On 23 February 2010, Gerards revived his managerial career once more, taking over Panachaiki in the Gamma Ethniki, but left the club shortly after two months.

== Personal life ==
Eugène was the son of Johanna Gerards-Dedroeg and Joep Gerards (1906–1986), a former Dutch footballer who played for various top-level Limburgian clubs during the 1920s and 1930s, as well as the president of SV Limburgia during 1946–1973. His brother Jo Gerards (1936–2014) was an amateur football manager, scout for Limburgia and sports journalist for the local newspaper. He has a younger sister Antoinette, who is a real football fan. Alongside his managerial certificates, Gerards had a certificate for retail, as well as a pilot's certificate. Gerards has a daughter from his first marriage and a son from his second marriage in the Netherlands. He married his third wife Katerina in 2004, and became a permanent resident of Crete. Characteristic of his love for Crete, he acquired Greek citizenship and founded his own winery "Geraldakis", adopting the Cretan diminutive surname ending -akis to his Dutch surname in order to signal his identification as a Cretan, a form he also used in public appearances.

=== Recognition ===
Gerards was widely considered as one of the greatest managers in Greek football. He has been honored by the club where he made his name as a manager, OFI on several occasions. A friendly game was held in his honor in 2000 at the club's home ground Theodoros Vardinogiannis Stadium, in which he later was offered a permanent, leather seat with his name engraved on it. In 2017 the club's board of directors decided to name the stadium's Gate 9 after him. On 20 November 2017, a special international friendly game was held to celebrate his service to the club in which Gerards' "children" (former Greek and foreign OFI players during the years 1985–2000) played against some of the most recognized players in recent Greek football history (Gerards' "friends").

=== Health issues and death ===
Gerards first cited being plagued by health issues as the foremost reason for him retiring as manager in 2000 after 15 years of service at OFI. In 2005, he was diagnosed with Progressive supranuclear palsy. His health had since deteriorated over the years, and by his mid-70s he was a wheelchair user. He died on 2 January 2018 aged 77. He is survived by his daughter Nathalie (1968) from his first marriage and son from his second marriage Frank (1981), his third wife Katerina and her two sons Manolis and Minas.

== Managerial statistics ==
As of match played 11 November 2003.

| Team | From | To | Record | | | | |
| Team | From | To | M | W | D | L | Win % |
|---|---|---|---|---|---|---|---|
| Roda JC | 26 November 1984 | 2 December 1984 | 1 | 0 | 0 | 1 | 0.00 |
| OFI | 1 July 1985 | 30 June 2000 | 630 | 308 | 128 | 194 | 48.89 |
| APOEL | 1 July 2001 | 28 December 2002 | 51 | 30 | 9 | 12 | 58.82 |
| Iraklis | 28 December 2002 | 9 November 2003 | 28 | 12 | 5 | 11 | 42.86 |
| Panachaiki | 23 February 2010 | 19 April 2010 | 7 | 2 | 3 | 2 | 28.57 |
| Total | | | 717 | 352 | 145 | 220 | 49.1 |

== Honours ==
=== Manager ===
OFI

- Greek Cup: 1986–87

APOEL

- Cypriot First Division: 2001–02

=== Records ===
- OFI: all-time longest serving manager: 1985–2000.
- Hellenic Football Federation all-time longest serving manager in a single club: 1985–2000 (OFI).
