= Dimitris Tsironis =

Greek footballer

Takis Tsironis
Personal information
- Full name: Dimitrios Tsironis
- Date of birth: 26 October 1959 (age 67)
- Place of birth: Neapoli, Thessaloniki, Greece
- Position: Forward

Youth career
- –1974: Ermis Neapolis

Senior career*
Years	Team	Apps	(Gls)
1974–1979	Makedonikos		
1979–1984	Kastoria	86	(23)
1984–??	Makedonikos		
Medal record
Gold medal – first place	Greek Cup	1980
- * Club domestic league appearances and goals

Dimitris "Takis" Tsironis (born 26 October 1959) is a Greek former footballer who played as a forward.

== Career ==
Born in Neapoli, Thessaloniki Tsironis started his career from the local team Ermis Neapolis. At his 15, he transferred to Makedonikos. In 1979 has an offer from PAOK, but the fee was very low. A few days later Tsironis transferred to Kastoria, and the total cost of the transfer was reached at 12,000,000 drachmas. In his first season with Kastoria, Tsironis scored 25 goals in official and friendly games. Along with his fellow players they shocked the Greek football world by winning the Greek Cup in 1980. Kastoria became the first provincial which awarded the Cup, and Tsironis shined. At the final he scored 3 goals against Iraklis in a 5–2 victory. He scored all his goals at the second half, and also he earned a penalty-kick when he frustrated after a 50 metres run. It was the third hat-trick in a final, and the first after 1947. He was also the first scorer of Greek Cup this season with 9 goals. At the next season he played at the Cup Winners' Cup against Dinamo Tbilisi. Kastoria eliminated after a 0–0 home victory and a 2–0 defeat, and Tsironis had two post hits. The Soviet newspapers mention his excellent performance. Tsironis was the only young and talented player of Kastoria, who didn't made a transfer to a biggest club, in addition with several fellow players. Despite, he had many offers his club rejected it. These facts reacted to his career. He felt disappointed and his career declined fast. In 1984 he returned to Makedonikos. After his retirement he became a football agent.

== Career statistics ==
Alpha Ethniki
Year	Apps	Goals
1979–1980	24	10
1980–1981	16	3
1981–1982	27	7
1982–1983	19	3
Total	86	23

== Honours ==
Kastoria

- Greek Cup: 1979–80

Individual

- Greek Football Cup top goalscorer: 1979–80 (9 Goals)
