= Zoran Jevtović =

Serbian footballer

Personal information
- Full name: Zoran Jevtović
- Date of birth: 20 April 1958 (age 68)
- Place of birth: SFR Yugoslavia
- Position: Midfielder

Senior career*
Years	Team	Apps	(Gls)
–1988	Rad		
1988–1992	Apollon Athens	104	(5)
1992–1993	Atromitos		

Managerial career
- 2009: Thrasyvoulos (caretaker)
- * Club domestic league appearances and goals

Zoran Jevtović (born 20 April 1958) is a retired footballer who played as a midfielder for clubs in Yugoslavia and Greece.

== Club career ==
Jevtović began playing football with FK Rad, helping the club gain promotion to the Yugoslav First League.

In 1988, Jevtović moved abroad, joining Greek first division side Apollon Athens for four seasons. He would move to Greek second division side Atromitos F.C. for the 1992–93 season.

== Manager career ==
Following his playing career, Jevtović became a football manager. He led Thrasyvoulos F.C. during 2009.
