= Nikos Kourkounas =

Greek footballer and manager (born 1966)

Personal information
- Full name: Nikolaos Kourkounas
- Date of birth: 5 January 1966 (age 60)
- Position: Goalkeeper

Senior career*
| Years | Team | Apps | (Gls) |
| 1984–1991 | Apollon Athens | | |
| 1986 | → Panelefsiniakos (loan) | | |
| 1991–1996 | Ionikos | | |
| 1996–1998 | Ethnikos Piraeus | | |
| 1998–1999 | Apollon Athens | | |
| 1999–2000 | Panelefsiniakos | | |
| 2000–2002 | Apollon Smyrnis | | |

Managerial career
- 2001: Apollon Smyrnis
- 2002–2003: Olympiacos Volos
- 2003: Apollon Smyrnis
- 2004: Apollon Smyrnis
- 2006–2007: Apollon Smyrnis
- * Club domestic league appearances and goals

Nikos Kourkounas (Greek: Νίκος Κουρκούνας; born 5 January 1966) is a Greek professional football manager and former player.
