= Krystian Szuster =

Polish footballer

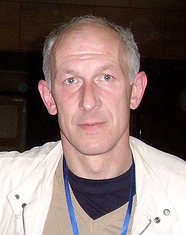

Personal information
- Date of birth: 6 March 1963 (age 63)
- Place of birth: Chorzów, Poland
- Height: 1.86 m (6 ft 1 in)
- Position: Midfielder

Youth career
- Ruch Chorzów

Senior career*
Years	Team	Apps	(Gls)
1984–1985	Ruch Chorzów	38	(3)
1986	Śląsk Wrocław	12	(5)
1987–1990	Ruch Chorzów	67	(12)
1990	Halmstad	9	(0)
1991	Ruch Chorzów	6	(0)
1991–1992	Penafiel	18	(4)
1992–1993	GKS Katowice	17	(3)
1994–1996	Górnik Lędziny		
1996–1997	Sokół Tychy	19	(3)
2002–2003	LKS Miedźna		
2003	LKS Orzeł Mokre		

International career
1989	Poland	3	(0)
- * Club domestic league appearances and goals

Krystian Szuster (born 6 March 1963) is a Polish former professional footballer who played as a midfielder. Most of his career was associated with his hometown club Ruch Chorzów, with whom he won the Ekstraklasa title in the 1988–89 season. In 1993, he won the Polish Cup with GKS Katowice.

Szuster earned three caps for the Poland national football team in 1989, making his international debut on 7 February 1989 in a match against the Costa Rica national team.

== Honours ==
Ruch Chorzów

- Ekstraklasa: 1988–89

GKS Katowice

- Polish Cup: 1992–93
