= Gerasimos Voukelatos =

Greek footballer (born 1998)

Makis Voukelatos
Personal information
- Full name: Gerasimos Voukelatos
- Date of birth: 29 March 1998 (age 28)
- Place of birth: Cephalonia, Greece
- Height: 1.81 m (5 ft 11 in)
- Position: Winger

Team information
- Current team: Ethnikos Neo Keramidi

Youth career
- 2013–2015: Pankefalliniakos
- 2015–2016: Panionios

Senior career*
Years	Team	Apps	(Gls)
2016–2019	Panionios	7	(0)
2018	→ Platanias (loan)	0	(0)
2019	Kallithea	5	(1)
2019–2020	Kerkyra	8	(1)
2020	Platanias	3	(0)
2020–2021	Olympiacos Volos	17	(2)
2021–2022	Egaleo	10	(1)
2022–2023	Episkopi	22	(1)
2023–2024	Niki Volos	4	(0)
2024–2025	Rodos		
2025–	Ethnikos Neo Keramidi	7	(1)

International career^{‡}
2016	Greece U19	4	(0)
- * Club domestic league appearances and goals as of 1 July 2025 ‡ National team caps and goals as of 13 October 2016

Gerasimos 'Makis' Voukelatos (Greek: Γεράσιμος 'Μάκης' Βουκελάτος; born 29 March 1998) is a Greek professional footballer who plays as a winger for Gamma Ethniki club Ethnikos Neo Keramidi.
