= Georgios Athanasiadis (footballer, born 1963) =

Greek footballer

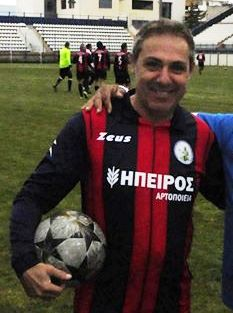

Personal information
- Full name: Georgios Athanasiadis
- Date of birth: 16 December 1963 (age 62)
- Place of birth: Athens, Greece
- Height: 1.70 m (5 ft 7 in)
- Position: Midfielder

Senior career*
Years	Team	Apps	(Gls)
1983–1984	Egaleo		
1984–1986	Apollon Smyrnis		
1986–1988	OFI		
1988–1991	Apollon Smyrnis		
1991–1992	Panathinaikos		
1992–1993	Xanthi		
1993–1994	OFI		
1995	Kavala		
1996–1998	Ethnikos Piraeus		

International career
1990–1991	Greece	9	(0)
- * Club domestic league appearances and goals

Georgios Athanasiadis (Greek: Γεώργιος Αθανασιάδης; born 16 December 1963) is a Greek former professional footballer who played as a midfielder.
