= Makis Tzatzos =

Greek footballer

Personal information
- Full name: Makis Tzatzos
- Date of birth: 6 November 1968 (age 57)
- Place of birth: Komanos, Ptolemaida, Greece
- Position: Attacking midfielder

Youth career
- Eordaikos

Senior career*
Years	Team	Apps	(Gls)
–1987	Eordaikos		
1988–1995	Xanthi	214	(?)
1995–1996	Aris	29	(2)
1996–1997	Skoda Xanthi	14	(0)
1997–1999	Anagennisi Karditsa		
2000–2001	Leonidio		
- * Club domestic league appearances and goals

Kosmas (Makis) Tzatzos (Greek: Μάκης Τζάτζος) (born 6 November 1968 in Komanos, Ptolemaida), is a retired football player (attacking midfielder) who connected his name mainly with Xanthi

== Career ==
His career began at his hometown, where he played for Eordaikos. His skills and talent were spotted by Xanthi and soon he became a member of the team (1988). Tzatzos was regarded by the media as a class player and he is one of the main reasons why Xanthi won the second division championship and earned promotion to the Super League Greece.

He played for Xanthi until 1995, when he joined Aris For a year he offered his services at the Salonica team, only to return to Xanthi in the second half of the 1996/97 season.

Tzatzos played his last game for Xanthi and his last in the Greek first division in May 1997, and he made a total of 178 league appearances for the club. He returned to his first team (Anagennisi Karditsas) and closed his career at Leonidio in 2001.
