= Miltos Andreanidis =

Greek footballer

Personal information
- Full name: Miltiadis Andreanidis
- Date of birth: 27 April 1959
- Place of birth: Kilkis
- Date of death: 14 May 2021 (aged 62)

Senior career*
Years	Team	Apps	(Gls)
1982–1992	OFI		
- * Club domestic league appearances and goals

Miltos Andreanidis (Greek: Μίλτος Ανδρεανίδης; born 27 April 1959 – 14 May 2021) was a Greek professional footballer who played as a midfielder.

Andreanidis died at the age of 62 on 14 May 2021.
