= Petros Michos =

Greek footballer and manager

Personal information
- Date of birth: 17 February 1959 (age 67)
- Place of birth: Agrinio, Greece
- Height: 1.81 m (5 ft 11 in)
- Position: Defender

Senior career*
Years	Team	Apps	(Gls)
1976–1978	Panetolikos	33	(0)
1978–1988	Olympiacos	241	(5)
1988–1991	Panionios	80	(3)
1991–1992	Olympiacos	1	(0)
1992–1993	Ionikos	24	(0)

International career
1978–1989	Greece	51	(0)

Managerial career
- 1994–1996: Panetolikos
- 1996–1997: Panetolikos
- 1997–1998: Panegialios
- 1998: Kallithea
- 1998: Athinaikos
- 1998–1999: Niki Volos
- 1999: Panetolikos
- 2005: PAS Giannina
- 2005–2006: Aiolikos
- 2009: Rouf
- 2009–2010: Aspropyrgos
- 2012: Fokikos
- 2012–2013: Tilikratis
- 2013: Olympiakos Lavrio
- 2014: Panelefsiniakos
- 2015–2016: Ialysos
- 2016: Aiolikos
- 2017: Asteras Amaliadas
- 2017–2018: Asteras Amaliadas (techn. director)
- * Club domestic league appearances and goals

Petros Michos (Greek: Πετρος Μίχος; born 17 February 1959) is a former Greek footballer that currently works as a manager. He started his career as a defender at Panetolikos but is better known for his many years with Olympiacos and the Greece national team in the 1980s.

== Club career ==
Petros Michos was born on 17 February 1959 in Agrinio. He began his professional career at his local team Panetolikos in the 1975–76 season, making his debut in the Greek top division on 7 December 1975, two months before his 17th birthday. He played there for three seasons before moving to Olympiacos in 1978. He was seen at the time as one of the best central defenders in Greece and he had 10 successful seasons with the Piraeus team. With Olympiacos he won five championships, four of them consecutively (1980, 1981, 1982, 1983 and 1987), a cup (1981) and was also named captain of the team. In 1988, he moved to Panionios for three seasons where he played for one more time in the cup final, in 1989. In 1991, he returned to Olympicos, with a view to finishing his career there but in the next season he went to Ionikos before returning to his first club Panetolikos, where he ended his career in 1994.

== International team ==
Petros started his international career in 1977 with the Greek youth team. He made his senior debut in 1982 where he was a key player and was capped 50 times for Greece. He participated in the qualifying phases of the 1984 and 1988 European Championships as well as in the qualifying round of the 1986 World Cup. His last game for the national team was in a friendly match against Turkey in Istanbul, on 21 September 1988.

== Managerial career ==
Following the end of his career Petros worked as manager for a lot of teams, mainly in the lower divisions with some good successes. He began in 1994 when he managed his home team Panetolikos following his retirement as a player, where he was able to achieve promotion in the 1996–97 season to the Greek second division. Afterwards, he worked for various other teams including, Kallithea, Panegialios, Athinaikos, Niki Volos, PAS Giannina, Aiolikos, Olympiakos Liosion, Asteras Magoulas, Rouf and currently Aiolikos.
