= Panarkadikos F.C. =

Greek football club

Panarkadikos
- Full name: Παναρκαδικός Αθλητικός Όμιλος (Panarcadian Athletic Club)
- Nickname: Πράσινοι (Greens)
- Founded: 22 May 1927; 99 years ago
- Ground: Panarkadikos Stadium
- Capacity: 4,000
- Chairman: Kostas Kontopoulos
- Manager: Spyros Lagos
- League: Arcadia FCA First Division
- 2025–26: Arcadia FCA Second Division, 1st (promoted)
- Website: http://www.panarkadikos.gr/
Home colours	Away colours

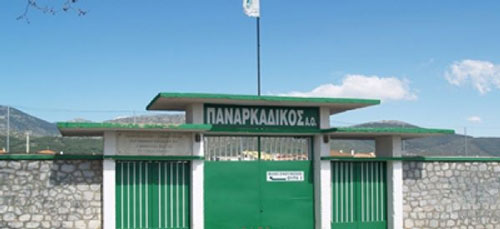
Panarkadikos stadium entrance

Panarkadikos Football Club (Greek: "Παναρκαδικός", transliterated "Panarcadikos" and meaning "Pan-Arcadian" i.e. "of all Arcadia") is a Greek football club based in Tripoli, Arcadia, Greece.

== History ==
The history of Panarkadikos begins in 1927 when the Bacolods, nickname of a family from the Basiakos district, invite the Homer brothers to help them in the friendly fight they would give with the Green Birds of Kalamata. The group of footballers has the idea that the group should be named Pan-Αrκadikos, since the players originate from all parts of Arcadia. On 22 May 1927, the application was filed with the Court of First Instance for the official recognition of the association.

Panarkadikos participated for many years in the championships of the 2nd and 3rd National Championship, without ever succeeding in his promotion to the National. The best time in his career is the 1975–76 season, when he was second in the South Group of the Nation. In the 1979–80 season, Panarkadikos reached the quarter-finals of the Greek Cup, where he was eliminated by Iraklis with a total score of 0–1. The same resumed the 1984–85 season, where in the quarter-finals he was eliminated from Levadiakos with a total score of 2–4. In 2013, Panarkadikos won his participation in the newly established Gamma Ethniki.

The most well-known footballers emerging from the ranks of his team are the international Giorgos Orphanides, Paul Chatzopoulos, Thomas Kyparissis. Thanasis Kalopisis is the player with the most participations and most goals in the team's history.

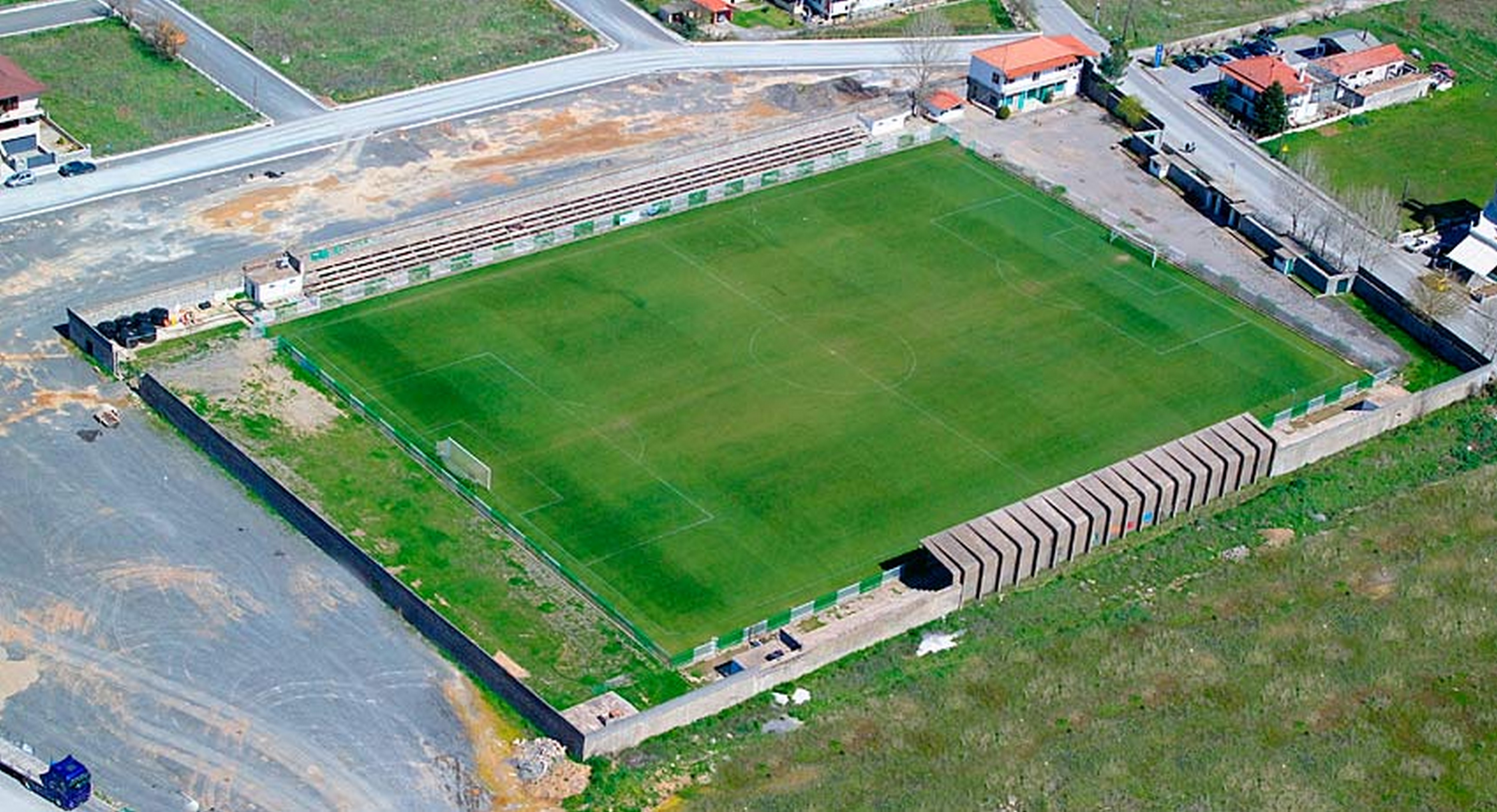
Panarkadikos stadium from above

== Honours ==
=== Domestic ===
  - Arcadia Football Clubs Association Champions: 11 (record)
    - 1953–54, 1954–55, 1962–63, 1964–65, 1968–69, 1972–73, 1995–96, 1999–2000, 2009–10, 2011–12, 2023–24
  - Arcadia Football Clubs Association Cup Winners: 10 (record)
    - 1972–73, 1974–75, 1981–82, 1991–92, 2010–11, 2012–13, 2015–16, 2017–18, 2020–21, 2023–24

== Other distinctions ==
=== Greek cup ===
- Quarter-finals of the competition: 2 times
  - 1979–80, 1984–85
