= 1979–80 Greek Football Cup =

1979–80 Greek Cup
Tournament details
- Country: Greece
- Teams: 58

Final positions
- Champions: Kastoria (1st title)
- Runners-up: Iraklis

Tournament statistics
- Matches played: 62
- Goals scored: 204 (3.29 per match)
- Top goal scorer(s): Dimitris Tsironis (9 goals)

The 1979–80 Greek Football Cup was the 38th edition of the Greek Football Cup.

== Tournament details ==
Totally 58 teams participated, 18 from Alpha Ethniki and 40 from Beta Ethniki. It was held in 6 rounds, including the final.

For the first time, a club not based in Attica or Thessaloniki Prefecture, Kastoria, was awarded the cup. They achieved an unexpected victory over Iraklis in the final with the impressive score of 5–2, while at the same time ensured (for the first and only time until today) their participation in the next season's Cup Winners' Cup].

In their way to the final, Kastoria eliminated Ethnikos Piraeus (winning during extra time and while Ethnikos had 5 post hits), Kavala, Olympiakos Loutraki, AEL and Makedonikos.

On the other hand, Iraklis eliminated lower division teams Veria, Niki Volos, Almopos Aridea and Panarkadikos to reach the semi-finals, where they faced rivals PAOK. Both matches were held in Iraklis home, Kaftanzoglio Stadium and Iraklis advanced to the final with a 2–1 aggregate victory. Before the second leg, there was an alleged bribe attempt of PAOK footballer, Filotas Pellios, by Iraklis. Due to those charges, Iraklis were eventually relegated to Beta Ethniki.

Earlier, PAOK had eliminated Olympiacos, AEK Athens and Aris, before they were eliminated by fellow-citizen Iraklis. Panathinaikos made an early exit from the cup, following the defeat by PAS Giannina in the Second Round.

From the matches of the first round, Panathinaikos, Olympiacos, PAOK and Iraklis won Beta Ethniki teams with big scores. Dimitris Tsironis of Kastoria was the top scorer with 9 goals, 3 of which scored in the final. Kastoria success was decisive for some of their players' careers, as Sarganis, Simeoforidis, Papavasiliou and Dintsikos were later acquired by Olympiacos, Panathinaikos and AEK Athens, respectively.

== Calendar ==
Round	Date(s)	Fixtures	Clubs	New entries
First Round	21, 22, 29 November, 20 December 1979	28	58 → 29	58
Second Round	6, 7 February 1980	13	29 → 16	none
Round of 16	20, 21 February 1980	8	16 → 8	none
Quarter-finals	5 March, 26 April 1980	8	8 → 4	none
Semi-finals	7, 14, 21 May 1980	4	4 → 2	none
Final	25 May 1980	1	2 → 1	none

== Knockout phase ==
Each tie in the knockout phase, apart from the first three rounds and the final, was played over two legs, with each team playing one leg at home. The team that scored more goals on aggregate over the two legs advanced to the next round. If the aggregate score was level, the away goals rule was applied, i.e. the team that scored more goals away from home over the two legs advanced. If away goals were also equal, then extra time was played. The away goals rule was again applied after extra time, i.e. if there were goals scored during extra time and the aggregate score was still level, the visiting team advanced by virtue of more away goals scored. If no goals were scored during extra time, the winners were decided by a penalty shoot-out. In the first three rounds and the final, which were played as a single match, if the score was level at the end of normal time, extra time was played, followed by a penalty shoot-out if the score was still level.
The mechanism of the draws for each round is as follows:

- There are no seedings, and teams from the same group can be drawn against each other.

== First round ==
Team 1	Score	Team 2
Vyzas Megara	0–1	Aris
Anagennisi Karditsa	0–1	Agrotikos Asteras
Trikala	4–0	Petralona
Kozani	2–1	Kallithea
Panserraikos	6–0	Levadiakos
Makedonikos	1–1 (5–4 p)	Panionios
AEL	4–0	Kilkisiakos
Panathinaikos	9–1	Eordaikos
Apollon Athens	3–2 (a.e.t.)	Rodos
Acharnaikos	2–0	Doxa Drama
Panachaiki	3–4 (a.e.t.)	AEK Athens
Panthrakikos	1–0	Chania
Panetolikos	1–0	Xanthi
Almopos Aridea	7–3	Makedonikos Siatista
Anagennisi Epanomi	3–0	Ilisiakos
Olympiacos	7–0	Lamia
Atromitos	6–0	Ethnikos Asteras
Panelefsiniakos	1–4	PAS Giannina
Iraklis	7–0	Veria
Olympiakos Loutraki	2–1 (a.e.t.)	OFI
Kavala	3–0	A.F.C. Patra
Niki Volos	1–0	Proodeftiki
Fostiras	3–2	Naoussa
PAOK	6–0	Anagennisi Giannitsa
Ethnikos Piraeus	0–1 (a.e.t.)	Kastoria
Panegialios	4–1	Edessaikos
Pandramaikos	5–1	Olympiacos Volos
Egaleo	1–1 (1–4 p)	Korinthos
Panarkadikos	1–0	Irodotos

== Bracket ==
Second round
Aris (bye)
Acharnaikos (p)	0(4)
Atromitos	0(5)
Olympiacos	1
PAOK	2
AEK Athens	5
Panetolikos	1
Almopos Aridea	2
Fostiras	1
Niki Volos	0
Iraklis	5
Panarkadikos	1
Apollon Athens	0
Panthrakikos	3
Kozani	1
Olympiakos Loutraki (bye)
Kastoria	2
Kavala	0
AEL (p)	1(5)
Panserraikos	1(4)
PAS Giannina	2
Panathinaikos	1
Panegialios	0
Anagennisi Epanomi	1
Pandramaikos	1
Trikala	0
Agrotikos Asteras (bye)
Makedonikos
Korinthos

Round of 16
Aris (a.e.t.)	2
Atromitos	1
PAOK	1
AEK Athens	0
Almopos Aridea	1
Iraklis	2
Panarkadikos	3
Panthrakikos	1
Olympiakos Loutraki	1
Kastoria	5
AEL	1
PAS Giannina	0
Anagennisi Epanomi (p)	0(5)
Pandramaikos	0(4)
Agrotikos Asteras	1
Makedonikos	4

Quarter-finals
Aris	1	0	1
PAOK (a.e.t.)	0	2	2
Iraklis	1	0	1
Panarkadikos	0	0	0
Kastoria	1	1	2
AEL	0	1	1
Anagennisi Epanomi	1	1	2
Makedonikos	0	3	3

Semi-finals
PAOK	0	1	1
Iraklis	1	1	2
Kastoria	2	2	4
Makedonikos	0	1	1

Final
Iraklis	2
Kastoria	5

== Second round ==
Team 1	Score	Team 2
AEK Athens	5–1	Panetolikos
Almopos Aridea	2–1	Fostiras
Acharnaikos	0–0 (4–5 p)	Atromitos
PAS Giannina	2–1	Panathinaikos
Kastoria	2–0	Kavala
AEL	1–1 (5–4 p)	Panserraikos
Makedonikos	2–1	Korinthos
Niki Volos	0–5	Iraklis
Olympiacos	1–2	PAOK
Panarkadikos	1–0	Apollon Athens
Pandramaikos	1–0	Trikala
Panthrakikos	3–1	Kozani
Panegialios	0–1	Anagennisi Epanomi
Aris	bye	
Agrotikos Asteras	bye	
Olympiakos Loutraki	bye	

== Round of 16 ==
Team 1	Score	Team 2
Panarkadikos	3–1	Panthrakikos
AEL	1–0	PAS Giannina
PAOK	1–0	AEK Athens
Olympiakos Loutraki	1–5	Kastoria
Anagennisi Epanomi	0–0 (5–4 p)	Pandramaikos
Agrotikos Asteras	1–4	Makedonikos
Aris	2–1 (a.e.t.)	Atromitos
Almopos Aridea	1–2	Iraklis

== Quarter-finals ==
Team 1	Agg.	Team 2	1st leg	2nd leg
Aris	1–2	PAOK	1–0	0–2 (a.e.t.)
Kastoria	2–1	AEL	1–0	1–1
Iraklis	1–0	Panarkadikos	1–0	0–0
Anagennisi Epanomi	2–3	Makedonikos	1–0	1–3

== Semi-finals ==
Team 1	Agg.	Team 2	1st leg	2nd leg
PAOK	1–2^{*}	Iraklis	0–1	1–1
Kastoria	4–1	Makedonikos	2–0	2–1

^{*} Both games held at Kaftanzoglio Stadium. The second leg took part on 21 May.

== Final ==
25 May 1980
21:00 EEST

Iraklis	2–5	Kastoria
Kalabakas 14' (pen.); Mavrodoulakis 80'	Report	Simeoforidis 40'; Dintsikos 49'; Tsironis 69', 87', 90+1' (pen.)

AEK Stadium, Nea Filadelfia
Attendance: 9,471
Referee: Vasilis Vourakis (Piraeus)
