= Giannis Samaras =

Greek footballer

Personal information
- Full name: Ioannis Samaras
- Date of birth: 3 May 1961 (age 65)
- Place of birth: Melbourne, Australia
- Height: 1.87 m (6 ft 2 in)
- Position: Midfielder

Team information
- Current team: OFI (Director of Football)

Senior career*
Years	Team	Apps	(Gls)
1980–1984	Vyzas Megara		
1984–1989	OFI	114	(27)
1988	South Melbourne	1	(1)
1989–1991	Panathinaikos	48	(15)
1991–1996	OFI	103	(6)
Total		266	(49)

International career
1986–1990	Greece	16	(1)

Managerial career
- 2000–2002: OFI
- 2012–2017: Panathinaikos (general manager)
- * Club domestic league appearances and goals

Giannis Samaras (Greek: Γιάννης Σαμαράς; born 3 May 1961) is a former footballer who played as a midfielder during the 1980s and 1990s. Born in Australia, he represented Greece at international level.

== Club career ==
Samaras was born in Melbourne, Australia, to Greek parents who moved there at an early age. His father, Georgios, was a co-founder of South Melbourne FC, an Australian soccer club with strong ties to the Greek community and is Australia's most successful Football side. He moved to Greece at the age of thirteen. His son, also named Georgios, recently retired from professional football.

Ioannis began his football career in 1980 with Vyzas Megara, but before long he had attracted the attention of several bigger teams and he signed for OFI in the summer of 1984. He went on to play over 100 matches for Crete before he left for Panathinaikos in January 1989. In 1991, Samaras returned to Crete, playing 103 games and retiring in 1996. In 1988, Samaras made a guest appearance for South Melbourne Hellas (30 years after his father helped establish the club) and scored a goal as South Melbourne defeated Sydney Olympic 2-1 at Middle Park.

Samaras earned 16 caps for the Greece national team between 1986 and 1990. He scored one goal, on his eighth cap, in a 4–2 friendly win over Norway.

Samaras was appointed on 26 July 2010 as the new Technical Manager for the Panathinaikos F.C. academies, replacing Nikos Kovis.

== International career ==
=== International goals ===
Scores and results list Greece's goal tally first.

No	Date	Venue	Opponent	Score	Result	Competition
1.	22 February 1989	Olympic Stadium, Athens, Greece	Norway	1–0	4–2	Friendly
