= Grigoris Charalampidis =

Greek footballer (born 1958)

Personal information
- Full name: Grigorios Charalampidis
- Date of birth: 6 January 1958 (age 68)
- Place of birth: Drama, Greece
- Height: 1.90 m (6 ft 3 in)
- Position: Forward

Senior career*
| Years | Team | Apps | (Gls) |
| 1979–1981 | Doxa Drama | 61 | (20) |
| 1981–1986 | Panathinaikos | 110 | (56) |
| 1986–1989 | OFI | 77 | (21) |
| 1989–1990 | Pezoporikos Larnaca | | |

International career
| 1980–1984 | Greece | 8 | (0) |
- * Club domestic league appearances and goals

Grigoris Charalampidis (Greek: Γρηγόρης Χαραλαμπίδης; born 6 January 1958) is a Greek former footballer who played as a forward in the Alpha Ethniki throughout the 1980s. He was capped eight times for the Greece national football team.

== Career ==
Charalampidis began his career at Doxa Drama in 1979. In 1981, he joined Panathinaikos, where he stayed for five years. In 1986, he joined OFI. He ended his career at Pezoporikos Larnaca in 1990.

== Honours ==
- Alpha Ethniki: 1983–84, 1985–86
- Greek Cup: 1981–82, 1983–84, 1985–86, 1986–87
