= Nikos Goulis =

Greek footballer (born in 1959)

Personal information
- Full name: Nikolaos Goulis
- Date of birth: 18 February 1959 (age 67)
- Place of birth: Livadeia, Greece
- Height: 1.67 m (5 ft 6 in)
- Position: Defender

Senior career*
Years	Team	Apps	(Gls)
1982–1983	Panelefsiniakos		
1983–1993	OFI	249	
1993–1995	Levadiakos		
1995–1996	Panelefsiniakos		

Managerial career
- 1996–1998: Panelefsiniakos
- 1998–1999: Kavala
- 1999–2000: Trikala
- 2000: Kavala
- 2001: Apollon Smyrnis
- 2001: Kerkyra
- 2003: Thrasyvoulos
- 2004–2006: Ethnikos Piraeus
- 2008–2009: Kallithea
- 2007–2008: Ethnikos Piraeus
- 2008–2009: Ionikos
- 2009–2010: OFI
- 2010: Ethnikos Piraeus
- 2011: Glyfada
- 2012: Pierikos
- 2015–2016: OFI
- 2019: Ethnikos Piraeus
- 2022–2025: Levadiakos U19
- * Club domestic league appearances and goals

Nikos Goulis (Greek: Νίκος Γκουλής; born 18 February 1959) is a retired Greek football defender and later manager.
