= Kastoria 1980 F.C. =

Kastoria
- Full name: Αθλητικός Σύλλογος Καστοριά
- Nickname: Γουναράδες (Fur traders)
- Founded: 6 August 1963; 63 years ago as AGS Kastoria
- Ground: Municipal Stadium of Kastoria
- Capacity: 8,000
- Chairman: Athanasios Rimos
- Manager: Giannis Katsaros
- League: Gamma Ethniki
- 2025–26: Kastoria FCA First Division, 1st (promoted)
- Website: kastoria-fc.com.gr
Home colours	Away colours

Kastoria Football Club (Greek: Αθλητικός Σύλλογος Καστοριά, lit. 'Athletic Club Kastoria') is a Greek association football club based in the city of Kastoria, Western Macedonia, Greece.

== History ==
The club was established in 1963 as AGS Kastoria (Greek: Αθλητικός Γυμναστικός Σύλλογος Καστοριά) when three local football clubs (Aris, Atromitos and Orestias) merged to form one stronger team representing the town. In 1974, Kastoria played for the first time in the A' Ethniki, the top flight of Greek football. Kastoria played in the A' Division from 1974 until 1983 and again in season 1996–1997.

Kastoria won the Greek Cup in 1980 by defeating Iraklis. A few days later, on 29 May 1980, he played in the final of the 1st Super Cup of Greece against the champions Olympiacos, which he lost 4–3 in a match played at the Karaiskakis Stadium.

Following their historic 5–2 victory over Iraklis on 25 May 1980 at the Nikos Goumas Stadium, Kastoria became the first provincial team to win the Greek Cup. This triumph qualified them for the 1980–81 European Cup Winners' Cup, making Kastoria the first—and to date, only—football team from Western Macedonia to participate in a major UEFA competition.

In the first round, Kastoria were drawn against Soviet Cup winners Dinamo Tbilisi. The first leg took place on 17 September 1980 at Kaftanzoglio Stadium in Thessaloniki, as Kastoria's home ground did not meet UEFA requirements. In front of 20,000 spectators, Kastoria secured an impressive 0–0 draw against the Georgian side. However, in the second leg on 1 October 1980 at the Lenin Dinamo Stadium in Tbilisi, Kastoria were defeated 2–0 in front of 30,000 fans, ending their European run. Dinamo Tbilisi ultimately went on to win the tournament that season.

Due to financial problems the club was dissolved in 2021, but returned under the name AS Kastoria 1980 buying the registration number of local club Megas Alexandros Kallithea.

They finished in 1st place in the Kastoria FCA championship and earned a spot in the 2022 Greek Football Amateur Championship special promotion play-offs, where they finished 3rd, securing promotion to Gamma Ethniki for the 2022–23 season. In their first season in Gamma Ethniki (2022–23), they narrowly avoided relegation, but in the following campaign (2023–24), they were relegated back to the Kastoria FCA First Division after two years, largely due to poor home performance.

They immediately won the Kastoria FCA championship in the 2024–25 season and competed in the 2025 Greek Football Amateur Championship special promotion play-offs for return to Gamma Ethniki, but ultimately failed to secure promotion, finishing last in a 6-team group with just one home win and losing every away match. The following season (2025–26), they won the regional double once again, this time successfully securing promotion back to Gamma Ethniki after a two-year absence.

== Crest & Colours ==
The crest features a beaver. The club's official colors are red, yellow, and white.

Old

Until 2021

From 2021

== Honours ==
Kastoria 1980 F.C. honours
Type	Competition	Titles	Seasons
Domestic	Super League Greece 2	1	1973–74
Domestic	Gamma Ethniki	2	1994–95, 2003–04
Domestic	Greek Football Cup	1	1979–80

=== Regional titles ===
- Kastoria FCA First Division
  - Winners (5): 2012–13, 2016–17, 2021–22, 2024–25, 2025–26
- Kastoria FCA Cup
  - Winners (6): 2000–01, 2001–02, 2016–17, 2022–23, 2024–25, 2025–26
- Kastoria FCA Super Cup
  - Winners (4): 2022, 2023, 2025, 2026

== League history ==
Sources:

- 1963 – 74: Division 2
- 1974 – 83: Division 1
- 1983 – 92: Division 2
- 1992 – 95: Division 3
- 1995 – 96: Division 2
- 1996 – 97: Division 1
- 1997 – 98: Division 2
- 1998 – 99: Division 3
- 1999 – 02: Division 4
- 2002 – 04: Division 3
- 2004 – 09: Division 2
- 2009 – 10: Division 3
- 2010 – 12: Division 4
- 2012 – 13: First category Kastoria FCA
- 2013 – 15: Division 3
- 2015 – 17: Kastoria FCA First Division
- 2017 – 18: Division 3
- 2018 – 19: inactive
- 2019 – 21: Kastoria FCA Second Division
- 2021 – 22: Kastoria FCA First Division
- 2022 – 24: Division 3
- 2024 – 26: Kastoria FCA First Division
- 2026 – : Division 3

== European matches ==
Season	Competition	Round	Club	Home	Away	Aggregate
1980–81	European Cup Winners' Cup	1st round	(Soviet Union) Dinamo Tbilisi	0–0	0–2	0–2

== Notable players ==
- (Greece) Kyriakos Karataidis
- (Greece) Antonis Minou
- (Greece) Georgios Paraschos
- (Greece) Nikos Sarganis
- (Greece) Giannis Dintsikos

== Notable managers ==
- (Poland) Kazimierz Górski
