= Grigoris Tsinos =

Greek footballer

Personal information
- Full name: Grigorios Tsinos
- Date of birth: 15 December 1958 (age 67)
- Place of birth: Thessaloniki, Kingdom of Greece

Youth career
- –1978: Iraklis

Senior career*
Years	Team	Apps	(Gls)
1980–1982	Roda JC	52	(0)
1982–1984	Panathinaikos		
1984–1992	OFI		
1992–1994	Ethnikos Piraeus		

Managerial career
- 1999–2000: Agios Nikolaos
- 2000: Kozani
- 2004–2005: Agrotikos Asteras
- 2006: Kozani
- 2006: Enosi Thraki
- 2006–2007: Polykastro
- * Club domestic league appearances and goals

Grigoris Tsinos (Greek: Γρηγόρης Τσινός; born 15 December 1958) is a Greek retired football midfielder and later manager.
