= 1985–86 AEK Athens F.C. season =

AEK Athens
1985–86 season
- Chairman: Andreas Zafiropoulos
- Manager: Jacek Gmoch (until 12 June); Nikos Christidis
- Stadium: Athens Olympic Stadium
- Alpha Ethniki: 3rd
- Greek Cup: Semi-finals
- UEFA Cup: First round
- Top goalscorer: League: Håkan Sandberg (12); All: Márton Esterházy (17)
- Highest home attendance: 74,465 vs Olympiacos (9 February 1986)
- Lowest home attendance: 1,454 vs Chalkida (12 February 1986)
- Average home league attendance: 31,439
- Biggest win: AEK Athens 10–0 Ilioupoli
- Biggest defeat: Real Madrid 5–0 AEK Athens
Home colours	Away colours

The 1985–86 season was the 62nd season in the existence of AEK Athens F.C. and the 27th consecutive season in the top flight of Greek football. They competed in the Alpha Ethniki, the Greek Cup and the UEFA Cup. The season began on 8 September 1985 and finished on 23 June 1986.

== Kits ==
Supplier: Zita Hellas
Sponsor(s): Ethniki Asfalistiki

Home	Away

== Overview ==
In the summer of 1985, AEK were forced to play their home games at the Athens Olympic Stadium, due to construction works at AEK Stadium. Since both Olympiacos and Panathinaikos used the same stadium as their home ground at the time, resulted in the conduction of league games on Saturday, so that all 3 teams could be served simultaneously. Antonis Georgiadis left the club to take over the bench of Olympiacos. For his replacement Andreas Zafiropoulos hired Jacek Gmoch, who had won the domestic double in 1984 and reached the semi-finals of the European Cup with Panathinaikos. Christos Ardizoglou left the club and returned to Apollon Athens after a failed attempt to transfer to Olympiacos.

In the UEFA Cup, AEK had a very difficult draw, as they faced the mighty Real Madrid. In the first match at home the yellow-blacks played a good game with its main elements being passion, organization and the creation of scoring opportunities. AEK eventually reached a historic 1–0 win thanks to the goal of Pavlos Papaioannou and the faint of Márton Esterházy over the ball that confused the goalkeeper. In the second leg, AEK lined up with an offensive orientation, but they were overwhelmed by the Real Madrid and were easily defeated by 5–0. Thus, the yellow-blacks were left out of the competitions and the merengues went in their eventual conquest of the title.

In first round of the Cup, AEK faced Ilioupoli in a single match at home, where they easily passed through with an easy 10–0 win. Afterwards, they eliminated Kallithea, with the qualification being decided in the second leg with a 0–1 away win that came after the 1–1 at home. At the round of 16, the yellow-blacks came across Chalkida, who they easily eliminated with wins at both legs. Their opponent in the quarter-finals was Panachaiki and after a 3–0 in the first leg, the rematch at Patras was purely procedural, which ended in a 1–0 defeat. Thus, AEK reached the semi-finals facing Panathinaikos. In the first match at the Olympic Stadium, with the yellow-blacks as hosts, depite AEK taking the 2–0 lead, Panathinaikos managed to escape with a 2–2. In the rematch at the same stadium the yellow-blacks once again took the lead making the 0–1, but again the greens responded with two goals and turned the match around, taking the qualification to the final, which they eventually won.

AEK started the league with two victories against PAOK and Aris, but the continuation was not proportional. In December, both Vangelis Vlachos and Lysandros Georgamlis left for Panathinaikos. Their departure greatly affected the team's later performance in the league. However, at the same time, they were strengthened with the addition of Greek-Australian expatriate, Jim Patikas. The whole season was marked by the successive ups and downs in the performance of the team, which could not acquire duration and rhythm. The club presented two different faces in their struggles at home and away matches. In home matches they finished the season undefeated, but with 7 draws that knocked them out of the title race. In the away matches they gathered 7 defeats in 15 games. The team finished at the third place where they were tied with Iraklis, 7 points behind the champion Panathinaikos and 2 behind the second OFI.

However, the whole season was accompanied by the court thriller that was reserved for the end. AEK were playing in the penultimate matchday at Serres against Panserraikos. ΑΕΚ wanted the victory to stay on track for a ticket to the next season's UEFA Cup. At the eve of the match on April 19 the general manager of AEK, Giannis Chrysovitsianos, was arrested on the accusation of attempted bribery to the players of Panserraikos, Michalis Galatidis, Giorgos Sfakianakis and Giannis Antoniadis to underperform in the match, through their former player, Giorgos Rigas. The match took place normally and Panserraikos won by 2–0, a result that eventually did not help them avoid relegation. That resulted in the league standings not being secured, until the case was finalized. That eventually happened at mid-June, with AEK being punished with the deduction of 3 points from the next season's championship. Thus, the organizing authority decided to conduct a third place play-off match between AEK and Iraklis. Iraklis considered the punishment of AEK from the following season to be a scandal, as well as the acquittal of OFI for the double doping of their player, Alejandro Hisis.

The play-off match was set for June 23 at Volos. The delay of the conduction of the match was such that Esterházy competed with his national team at the 1986 FIFA World Cup and returned to play with AEK. Meanwhile, Gmoch not having any offers by the management for his contract renewal, left the club with his assistant, Nikos Christidis sitting on the bench for the match. Iraklis, who disagreed with the conduction of the match, threatened not to show up. Nevertheless, they were forced to show up in fear of punishment and thus they tried to make a parody of the match. The squad of Iraklis was consisted of 10 players, since according to their management, the rest of the players were on vacation. At the 53rd minute while the match was at 0–0, Iraklis were left with 6 players after Zifkas and Karaiskos were sent off, while Santexis and Adamou left the pitch injured. Thus, according to the regulation, the referee interrupted the match and AEK were awarded the match with a 2–0 win, securing a European ticket.

The club's top scorer in the league was Håkan Sandberg with 12 goals and in total was Márton Esterházy with 17. One of the few positives of that season was that AEK achieved an average league ticket record in their history with 31,254 tickets per game.

== Management team ==
Position	Staff
Manager	(Greece) Nikos Christidis
Goalkeeping coach	(Greece) Stelios Serafidis
Head of Medical	(Greece) Lakis Nikolaou

== Players ==
=== Squad information ===
NOTE: The players are the ones that have been announced by the AEK Athens' press release. No edits should be made unless a player arrival or exit is announced. Updated 23 June 1986, 23:59 UTC+3.

Player	Nat.	Position(s)	Date of birth (Age)	Signed	Previous club	Transfer fee	Contract until
Goalkeepers
Spyros Ikonomopoulos	(Greece)	GK	25 July 1959 (aged 26)	1979	(Greece) AEK Athens U20	—	1989
Theologis Papadopoulos	(Greece)	GK	12 January 1960 (aged 26)	1984	(Greece) AEL	₯9,000,000	1989
Defenders
Makis Chatzis	(Greece)	RB / LB	30 March 1957 (aged 29)	1984	(Greece) Apollon Athens	₯6,750,000	1989
Panagiotis Stylianopoulos	(Greece)	RB / LB / DM	4 September 1957 (aged 28)	1978	(Greece) AEK Athens U20	—	1986
Ilias Armodoros	(Greece)	LB / DM	25 January 1960 (aged 26)	1985	(Greece) Ethnikos Piraeus	Free	1990
Takis Karagiozopoulos	(Greece)	CB / DM / ST	4 February 1961 (aged 25)	1981	(Greece) Veria	₯8,000,000	1991
Polyvios Chatzopoulos	(Greece)	CB / DM	17 July 1961 (aged 24)	1985	(Greece) Panionios	₯10,400,000	1990
Stelios Manolas	(Greece)	CB / RB	13 July 1961 (aged 24)	1980	(Greece) AEK Athens U20	—	1989
Stefanos Porfyris	(Greece)	CB	2 September 1965 (aged 20)	1985	(Greece) AEK Athens U20	—	1990
Midfielders
Pavlos Dimitriou	(Greece)	AM / LM / LB	24 March 1957 (aged 29)	1985	(Greece) Panserraikos	₯11,000,000	1990
Dinos Ballis	(Greece)	AM / CM / DM / SS / ST / CB	25 May 1957 (aged 29)	1981	(Greece) Aris	₯17,000,000	1986
Pavlos Papaioannou	(Greece) (Brazil)	DM / RB / LB / RM	19 May 1959 (aged 27)	1983	(Greece) Rodos	₯10,000,000	1988
Nikos Pias	(Greece)	CM / DM	7 April 1960 (aged 26)	1984	(Greece) Rodos	₯1,350,000	1989
Babis Akrivopoulos	(Greece)	AM / RM / LM / SS / ST	4 September 1961 (aged 24)	1983	(Greece) Veria	₯8,400,000	1988
Jim Patikas	(Australia) (Greece)	RM / LM / RW / LW / SS	18 October 1963 (aged 22)	1985	(Australia) Sydney Croatia	₯5,000,000	1988
Dimitris Stafylidis	(Greece)	CM	1 January 1965 (aged 21)	1985	(Greece) AEK Athens U20	—	1988
Forwards
Thomas Mavros (Captain)	(Greece)	ST / LW	31 May 1954 (aged 32)	1976	(Greece) Panionios	₯10,000,000	1987
Márton Esterházy	(Hungary)	SS / AM / ST / RW / LW / RM / LM	9 April 1956 (aged 30)	1984	(Hungary) Honvéd	₯22,950,000	1986
Håkan Sandberg	(Sweden)	ST	27 July 1958 (aged 27)	1984	(Sweden) IFK Göteborg	₯8,000,000	1988
Andreas Voitsidis	(Greece)	ST / RW / LW	28 April 1960 (aged 26)	1984	(Greece) Kastoria	₯2,400,000	1989
Giannis Dintsikos	(Greece)	ST / SS / RW / LW / AM	25 June 1960 (aged 26)	1981	(Greece) Kastoria	₯20,000,000	1991
Georgios Christodoulou	(Greece)	ST / SS / LW	20 May 1967 (aged 19)	1985	(Greece) Akratitos	Free	1988
Left during Winter Transfer Window
Christos Arvanitis	(Greece)	GK	23 January 1953 (aged 33)	1982	(Greece) Olympiacos	₯7,000,000	1986
Lysandros Georgamlis (Vice-captain)	(Greece)	RB / CB / DM / LB	25 February 1962 (aged 24)	1980	(Greece) AEK Athens U20	—	1985
Vangelis Vlachos	(Greece)	AM / CM / RM / LM	6 January 1962 (aged 24)	1979	(Greece) AEK Athens U20	—	1989
Michalis Pytharoulis	(Greece)	ST	1966 (aged 19–20)	1984	(Greece) A.O. Agios Nikolaos	Free	1989

== Transfers ==
=== In ===
==== Summer ====
Pos.	Player	From	Fee	Date	Contract Until	Source
GK	(Greece) Fanis Kofinas	(Greece) Korinthos	Loan return	1 July 1985	30 June 1987	
DF	(Greece) Polyvios Chatzopoulos	(Greece) Panionios	₯10,400,000	21 June 1985	30 June 1990	
DF	(Greece) Stefanos Porfyris	(Greece) AEK Athens U20	Promotion	1 July 1985	30 June 1990	
DF	(Greece) Ilias Armodoros	(Greece) Ethnikos Piraeus	Free transfer	5 July 1985	30 June 1990	
MF	(Greece) Dimitris Stafylidis	(Greece) AEK Athens U20	Promotion	1 July 1985	30 June 1988	
FW	(Greece) Georgios Christodoulou	(Greece) Akratitos	Free transfer^{[a]}	11 July 1985	30 June 1988	

==== Winter ====
Pos.	Player	From	Fee	Date	Contract Until	Source
MF	(Australia) Jim Patikas	(Australia) Sydney Croatia	₯5,000,000	12 December 1985	30 November 1988	
MF	(Greece) Pavlos Dimitriou	(Greece) Panserraikos	₯11,000,000	16 December 1985	30 November 1990	

=== Out ===
==== Summer ====
Pos.	Player	To	Fee	Date	Source
DF	(Greece) Stavros Letsas	(Greece) Egaleo	Contract termination	9 August 1985	
MF	(Greece) Christos Ardizoglou	(Greece) Apollon Athens	Contract termination	15 July 1985	

==== Winter ====
Pos.	Player	To	Fee	Date	Source
GK	(Greece) Christos Arvanitis	(Greece) Olympiacos	₯6,000,000^{[b]}	16 December 1985	
DF	(Greece) Lysandros Georgamlis	(Greece) Panathinaikos	End of contract^{[c]}	22 November 1985	
MF	(Greece) Vangelis Vlachos	(Greece) Panathinaikos	₯16,000,000^{[b]}	10 December 1985	

=== Loan out ===
==== Summer ====
Pos.	Player	To	Fee	Date	Until	Option to buy	Source
GK	(Greece) Fanis Kofinas	(Greece) Ionikos	Free	15 July 1985	30 June 1987	✗	
DF	(Greece) Dimos Tsimiliotis	(Greece) Acharnaikos	Free	15 July 1985	30 June 1986	✗	

==== Winter ====
Pos.	Player	To	Fee	Date	Until	Option to buy	Source
FW	(Greece) Michalis Pytharoulis	(Greece) Vyzas Megara	Free	28 November 1985	30 November 1986	✗	

Notes

a. AEK gave as an exchange from their reserve team Kagarakis, Keramiotis and Voulgarelis, plus Dimas and Aravidis as a loan.

b. Plus the incomes from a friendly match between the clubs in the following summer.

c. AEK received the amount of ₯9,100,000 for the player's release.

=== Contract renewals ===
Pos.	Player	Date	Former Exp. Date	New Exp. Date	Source
DF	(Greece) Takis Karagiozopoulos	13 June 1986	30 June 1986	30 June 1991	
FW	(Sweden) Håkan Sandberg	28 May 1986	30 June 1986	30 June 1988	
FW	(Greece) Giannis Dintsikos	13 June 1986	30 June 1986	30 June 1991	

=== Overall transfer activity ===
==== Expenditure ====
Summer: ▼ ₯10,400,000

Winter: ▼ ₯16,000,000

Total: ▼ ₯26,400,000

==== Income ====
Summer: ▲ ₯0

Winter: ▲ ₯22,000,000

Total: ▲ ₯22,000,000

==== Net Totals ====
Summer: ▼ ₯10,400,000

Winter: ▲ ₯6,000,000

Total: ▼ ₯4,400,000

== Pre-season and friendlies ==
18 July 1985 Friendly	Brage	0–2	AEK Athens	Borlänge
20:00 EEST (UTC+3)		Report	Esterházy 14' (pen.); Sandberg 53'	Stadium: Domnarvsvallen; Attendance: 2,000; Referee: Kristiansen (Sweden)

23 July 1985 Friendly	Örebro	2–3	AEK Athens	Örebro
19:00 EEST (UTC+3)	Hammar 33'; Engdahl 52'	Report	Ballis 34'; Dintsikos 36'; Esterházy 66' (pen.)	Stadium: Eyravallen; Attendance: 1,500

25 July 1985 Friendly	Västerås	0–1	AEK Athens	Västerås
20:00 EEST (UTC+3)		Report	Sandberg 31'	Stadium: Arosvallen; Attendance: 1,500; Referee: Karlsson (Sweden)

27 July 1985 Friendly	Krylbo IF	5–7	AEK Athens	Krylbo
20:00 EEST (UTC+3)	Larsson 3'; Persson 10', 20', 42'; Westman 58'	Report	Sandberg 5', 57' (pen.); Christodoulou 15'; Karagiozopoulos 39' (pen.); Dintsikos 67'; Zarikos 68'; Pias 75'	Stadium: Krylbo IP; Attendance: 2,000

28 July 1985 Friendly	Ludvika FK	0–4	AEK Athens	Ludvika
20:00 EEST (UTC+3)		Report	Sandberg 55', 87' (pen.); Dintsikos 59'; Kak 79' (o.g.)	Stadium: Hillängens IP; Attendance: 4,500

12 August 1985 Friendly	Iraklis	4–3	AEK Athens	Thessaloniki
21:00 EEST (UTC+3)	Maloumidis 17' (pen.); Chatzopoulos 35' (o.g.); Adamou 43'; D. Papadopoulos 89'	Report	Armodoros 44'; Arvanitis (yellow card) 45'; P. Papaioannou 62'; Sandberg 77'	Stadium: Kaftanzoglio Stadium; Attendance: 7,055; Referee: Panagiotis Koutris (Thessaloniki)

14 August 1985 Friendly	AEL	3–2	AEK Athens	Larissa
20:30 EEST (UTC+3)	Valaoras 19'; Parafestas 59' (pen.); Tsiolis 69'	Report	Esterházy (penalty missed) 65', 71', 79'	Stadium: Alcazar Stadium; Attendance: 7,717; Referee: Kostas Lappas (Karditsa)

19 August 1985 Friendly	AEK Athens	2–3	Honvéd	Marousi
21:00 EEST (UTC+3)	Ballis 4'; Papaioannou 78'	Report	Sikesdi 39'; Gyimesi 64'; Bodonyi 4'	Stadium: Olympic Stadium; Attendance: 23,710; Referee: Giorgos Koukoulakis (Heraklion)

21 August 1985 Friendly	AEK Athens	1–1	Olympiacos	Marousi
21:00 EEST (UTC+3)	Karagiozopoulos (yellow card) 30'; Sandberg 42', (yellow card) 43'; Pias (yellow card) 69'	Report	Skouras (red card) 43'; Mitropoulos 71'	Stadium: Olympic Stadium; Attendance: 52,274; Referee: Makis Germanakos (Athens)

26 August 1985 Friendly	AEK Athens	0–1	PAS Giannina	Marousi
21:00 EEST (UTC+3)		Report	Lappas 26'; Pasialis (yellow card) 76'	Stadium: Olympic Stadium; Attendance: 8,430; Referee: Stratos Kannos (Athens)

30 August 1985 Friendly	Ethnikos Piraeus	0–1	AEK Athens	Piraeus
21:15 EEST (UTC+3)		Report	Dintsikos 82'; Sandberg (penalty missed) 85'	Stadium: Karaiskakis Stadium; Attendance: 3,940; Referee: Sfondylis

1 September 1985 Friendly	Apollon Athens	0–0	AEK Athens	Rizoupoli
17:30 EEST (UTC+3)		Report		Stadium: Rizoupoli Stadium; Attendance: 5,126; Referee: Vangelis Markou (Larissa)

== Competitions ==
=== Overall record ===
Competition	First match	Last match	Starting round	Final position	Record							
Competition	First match	Last match	Starting round	Final position	Pld	W	D	L	GF	GA	GD	Win %
Alpha Ethniki	8 September 1985	27 April 1986	Matchday 1	3rd	30	13	10	7	42	28	+14	43.33
3rd place play-off	23 June 1986		Final	Winners	1	1	0	0	0	0	+0	100.00
Greek Cup	6 November 1985	21 May 1986	First round	Semi-finals	9	5	2	2	22	7	+15	55.56
UEFA Cup	18 September 1985	2 October 1985	First round	First round	2	1	0	1	1	5	−4	50.00
Total					42	20	12	10	65	40	+25	47.62

Last updated: 23 June 1986
Source: Competitions

=== Alpha Ethniki ===
==== League table ====
Pos	Team	Pld	W	D	L	GF	GA	GD	Pts	Qualification or relegation
1	Panathinaikos (C)	30	18	7	5	58	26	+32	43	Qualification for European Cup first round
2	OFI	30	16	6	8	41	31	+10	38	Qualification for UEFA Cup first round (Note: AEK Athens and Iraklis tied at third place with 36 points. Despite AEK was found guilty for bribe against Panserraikos, the HFF punished the club with three points deduction from 1986–87 season. A play-off game was scheduled to play in Volos on 23 June. Iraklis made a protest and showed up with 10 players. At the 53rd minute with the score at 0–0, the match interrupted permanently. At this minute Iraklis after two red cards and 2 injuries, stay with 6 players on the pitch. The game forfeited to AEK with 2–0.)
3	AEK Athens	30	13	10	7	42	28	+14	36	Qualification for UEFA Cup first round
4	Iraklis	30	14	8	8	34	22	+12	36	
5	Olympiacos	30	14	6	10	57	42	+15	34	Qualification for Cup Winners' Cup first round (Note: Since Panathinaikos, winners of 1985–86 Greek Football Cup, were qualified for the 1986–87 European Cup, losing cup finalists Olympiacos earned a spot in the first round of the 1986–87 European Cup Winners' Cup.)

Source: RSSSF
Rules for classification: 1st points; 2nd head-to-head points; 3rd head-to-head goal difference; 4th decision match.
(C) Champions

==== Results summary ====
Overall								Home						Away					
Pld	W	D	L	GF	GA	GD	Pts	W	D	L	GF	GA	GD	W	D	L	GF	GA	GD
30	13	10	7	42	28	+14	36	8	7	0	26	9	+17	5	3	7	16	19	−3

Source: Competitive matches

==== Results by Matchday ====
Round	1	2	3	4	5	6	7	8	9	10	11	12	13	14	15	16	17	18	19	20	21	22	23	24	25	26	27	28	29	30
Ground	A	H	A	A	H	A	H	A	H	H	A	H	A	H	A	H	A	H	H	A	H	A	H	A	A	H	A	H	A	H
Result	W	W	L	D	W	L	D	W	D	W	W	W	L	W	L	D	L	D	D	W	W	L	W	W	D	D	D	W	L	D
Position	1	2	4	5	3	6	7	5	6	5	2	2	3	3	3	5	7	6	6	5	4	6	5	2	4	3	4	3	3	3

Source: Competitive matches
A = Away; H = Home; W = Win; D = Draw; L = Loss; P = Postponed

==== Matches ====
8 September 1985 1	Aris	0–3	AEK Athens	Thessaloniki
17:30 EEST (UTC+3)	Nikić (yellow card) 42'; Tzifopoulos (yellow card) 77'		Dintsikos 2'; Esterházy 24'; Sandberg 60'	Stadium: Kaftanzoglio Stadium; Attendance: 34,478; Referee: Stratos Kannos (Athens)

14 September 1985 2	AEK Athens	1–0	PAOK	Marousi
17:00 EEST (UTC+3)	Manolas 25'		Pittas (yellow card) 75'; Jurišić (yellow card) 87'	Stadium: Olympic Stadium; Attendance: 54,408; Referee: Kostas Adamopoulos (Athens)

22 September 1985 3	Doxa Drama	1–0	AEK Athens	Drama
17:00 EEST (UTC+3)	Ljumović 74', (yellow card) 80'; Flengas (yellow card) 76'		Arvanitis (yellow card) 22'; Karagiozopoulos (yellow card) 50'	Stadium: Doxa Drama Stadium; Attendance: 8,443; Referee: Nikos Andreou (Athens)

29 September 1985 4	Olympiacos	2–2	AEK Athens	Marousi
15:30 EEST (UTC+3)	Kokolakis (yellow card); Moukeas (yellow card); Šestić 34'; Anastopoulos 80' (pen.), (yellow card); Mitropoulos (yellow card) 76'		Pias (yellow card); Chatzis (yellow card); Papaioannou (yellow card) 8'; Esterházy 74', 86'	Stadium: Olympic Stadium; Attendance: 74,419; Referee: Giannis Batras (Karditsa)

6 October 1985 5	AEK Athens	2–1	Apollon Kalamarias	Marousi
15:30 EEST (UTC+3)	Pias (yellow card) 29'; Sandberg 33'; Armodoros (yellow card) 36'; Karagiozopoulos (yellow card) 46'; Mavros 70'		Chatziioannidis (yellow card); Katrakylakis (yellow card) 29', (goal) 85'	Stadium: Olympic Stadium; Attendance: 18,157; Referee: Stratos Kannos (Athens)

13 October 1985 6	OFI	2–0	AEK Athens	Heraklion
15:30 EEST (UTC+3)	Agiomamitis (yellow card); Tsinos (yellow card); Vasiliou (yellow card); Samaras 61'; Tsirimokos 75'		Sandberg (yellow card); Karagiozopoulos (yellow card); Mavros (yellow card)	Stadium: Ergotelis Stadium; Attendance: 8,490; Referee: Nikos Chrysanis (Imathia)

19 October 1985 7	AEK Athens	2–2	AEL	Marousi
17:30 EEST (UTC+3)	Sandberg 22'; Mavros 34'		Karapialis (yellow card) 36'; Valaoras 56'; Ziogas 82'	Stadium: Olympic Stadium; Attendance: 26,541; Referee: Petros Kalpakidis (Thessaloniki)

3 November 1985 8	PAS Giannina	0–1	AEK Athens	Ioannina
15:00 EET (UTC+2)			Sandberg 21'; Papaioannou (yellow card) 29' (yellow-red card) 77'; Manolas (yellow card) 30'	Stadium: Zosimades Stadium; Attendance: 13,130; Referee: Periklis Vasilakis (Athens)

10 November 1985 9	AEK Athens	1–1	Panionios	Marousi
15:00 EET (UTC+2)	Manolas (yellow card) 39', (goal) 47'		Emvoliadis (yellow card) 30'; Aposporis 75'; Karamichalos (yellow card) 87'	Stadium: Olympic Stadium; Attendance: 36,144; Referee: Stavros Zakestidis (Thessaloniki)

24 November 1985 10	AEK Athens	3–0	Panachaiki	Marousi
15:00 EET (UTC+2)	Manolas (yellow card); Esterházy 3', 8'; Dintsikos 82'		Kizas (yellow card); Patronis (yellow card)	Stadium: Olympic Stadium; Attendance: 12,969; Referee: Stefanos Tsirikidis (Thessaloniki)

1 December 1985 11	Apollon Athens	0–3	AEK Athens	Rizoupoli
14:45 EET (UTC+2)	Fabiatos (yellow card); Loukas (yellow card); Papageorgiou (yellow card)		Stafylidis 23', (yellow card); Sandberg 68'; Esterházy 80', (yellow card)	Stadium: Rizoupoli Stadium; Attendance: 11,607; Referee: Tasos Kaklamanos (Arcadia)

8 December 1985 12	AEK Athens	2–0	Ethnikos Piraeus	Marousi
14:45 EET (UTC+2)	Esterházy 9' (pen.); Dintsikos 25'		Batsinilas (yellow card); Kampolis (yellow card); F. Papadopoulos (yellow card); Peppes (yellow card) 28'	Stadium: Olympic Stadium; Attendance: 23,732; Referee: Giorgos Koukoulakis (Heraklion)
Note: At the 28th minute, the referee was injured and since the medical assistance did not work, he was forced to leave the match, which started with a 42-minute delay. The first linesman, Panagiotakis took the place of the referee and the position of the linesman was taken by Giakoumatos, after a draw with three other spectators referees. In the interruption, while the score was 2–0, Ethnikos made an objection for the match to be repeated.

15 December 1985 13	Iraklis	3–0	AEK Athens	Thessaloniki
14:45 EET (UTC+2)	Kofidis (yellow card) 23'; D. Papadopoulos 39'; Adamou 69'; Karaiskos 86'		Sandberg (yellow card) 2'; Karagiozopoulos (yellow card) 17'; Armodoros (yellow card) 69'; Ballis (yellow card) 78'; Dintsikos (yellow card) 81' (yellow-red card) 81'; Papaioannou (yellow card) 78'	Stadium: Kaftanzoglio Stadium; Attendance: 20,746; Referee: Stefanos Tsirikidis (Thessaloniki)

22 December 1985 14	AEK Athens	3–0	Panserraikos	Marousi
14:45 EET (UTC+2)	Stafylidis (yellow card); Ballis 8', 87'; Sandberg (yellow card) 73', (goal) 79'; Papaioannou (yellow card) 73'		Mavropoulos (yellow card)	Stadium: Olympic Stadium; Attendance: 7,234; Referee: Panagiotis Koutris (Thessaloniki)

5 January 1986 15	Panathinaikos	2–1	AEK Athens	Marousi
14:45 EET (UTC+2)	Saravakos 3'; Vlachos (yellow card) 5'; Georgamlis (yellow card) 54'; Antoniou 56'; Batsinilas (red card) 72'		Chatzopoulos (yellow card) 2'; Ballis 33', (yellow card) 35'; Papaioannou (yellow card) 37'; Armodoros (yellow card) 39'; Manolas (yellow card) 40'; Dimitriou (yellow card) 77'	Stadium: Olympic Stadium; Attendance: 74,493; Referee: Meletis Voutsaras (Athens)

11 January 1986 16	AEK Athens	1–1	Aris	Marousi
17:00 EET (UTC+2)	Esterházy (yellow card) 61', (goal) 81'		Bahtić (yellow card) 37'; Oikonomidis (yellow card) 43'; Moustakidis (yellow card) 53'; Kouis (yellow card) 60', (goal) 77'; Tziolas (yellow card) 86'	Stadium: Olympic Stadium; Attendance: 31,930; Referee: Giannis Batras (Karditsa)

26 January 1986 17	PAOK	2–1	AEK Athens	Thessaloniki
17:00 EET (UTC+2)	Psarras (yellow card); Singas 18'; Vasilakos 59'		Sandberg (yellow card); Mavros 43'	Stadium: Toumba Stadium; Attendance: 24,113; Referee: Michalis Matsoukas (Euboea)

2 February 1986 18	AEK Athens	1–1	Doxa Drama	Marousi
15:30 EET (UTC+2)	Chatzopoulos (yellow card) 23'; Manolas 52', (yellow card) 72'; Esterházy (penalty missed) 73; Ballis (yellow card) 83'		Pachatouridis 53'	Stadium: Olympic Stadium; Attendance: 9,680; Referee: Dimitris Dodos (Athens)
Note: AEK players entered the pitch with a 10-minute delay as protest for bad refereeing.

9 February 1986 19	AEK Athens	0–0	Olympiacos	Marousi
15:30 EET (UTC+2)	Pias (yellow card) 53'; Sandberg (yellow card) 62'; Dimitriou (yellow card) 64'			Stadium: Olympic Stadium; Attendance: 74,465; Referee: Christos Kolokythas (Athens)
Note: All time attendance record for AEK Athens.

16 February 1986 20	Apollon Kalamarias	0–1	AEK Athens	Thessaloniki
15:30 EET (UTC+2)	Zindros (yellow card) 17'; Traianopoulos (yellow card) 39'		Esterházy 16'; Manolas (yellow card) 60'; Voitsidis (yellow card) 74'	Stadium: Aris Stadium; Attendance: 1,725; Referee: Stratos Kannos (Athens)

23 February 1986 21	AEK Athens	1–0	OFI	Marousi
15:30 EET (UTC+2)	Dintsikos 75'			Stadium: Olympic Stadium; Attendance: 36,917; Referee: Vangelis Markou (Larissa)

2 March 1986 22	AEL	2–0	AEK Athens	Larissa
15:30 EET (UTC+2)	Kolomitrousis 15'; Valaoras 27'; Ziogas (yellow card) 65'; Kupcewicz (yellow card) 89'		Stafylidis (yellow card) 3'; Karagiozopoulos (yellow card) 16'; Sandberg (yellow card) 53'; Chatzis (yellow card) 89'	Stadium: Alcazar Stadium; Attendance: 13,839; Referee: Stefanos Tsirikidis (Thessaloniki)

8 March 1986 23	AEK Athens	4–1	PAS Giannina	Marousi
16:30 EET (UTC+2)	Sandberg 18'; Esterházy 31', 38'; Mavros 83'; Patikas (yellow card) 84'		Manevski (yellow card); Maipas 10'	Stadium: Olympic Stadium; Attendance: 17,402; Referee: Christos Kolokythas (Athens)

16 March 1986 24	Panionios	0–1	AEK Athens	Nea Smyrni
15:30 EET (UTC+2)	Gravanis (yellow card); Tsiantakis (yellow card); Mavrikis (red card) 30'		Stylianopoulos (yellow card); Manolas (yellow card); Ballis (red card) 30'; Sandberg 83'	Stadium: Nea Smyrni Stadium; Attendance: 13,364; Referee: Dimitris Naoum (Thessaloniki)

23 March 1986 25	Panachaiki	2–2	AEK Athens	Patras
16:00 EET (UTC+2)	Patronis (yellow card); Tassopoulos (yellow card); Vujadinović 76'; Giotis 84'		Esterházy (yellow card); Manolas (yellow card); Sandberg 4', 62'	Stadium: Panachaiki Stadium; Attendance: 11,307; Referee: Vassilios Nikakis (Aetoloacarnania)

30 March 1986 26	AEK Athens	1–1	Apollon Athens	Marousi
17:00 EEST (UTC+3)	Chatzopoulos (yellow card); Dintsikos 77'		Alexiou (yellow card); Fabiatos (yellow card); Poupakis (yellow card); Athanasiadis 75'	Stadium: Olympic Stadium; Attendance: 24,849; Referee: Tasos Kantartzis (Thessaloniki)

6 April 1986 27	Ethnikos Piraeus	1–1	AEK Athens	Piraeus
17:00 EEST (UTC+3)	Konstantinidis 45' (pen.); F. Papadopoulos (yellow card) 89'		Sandberg (yellow card) 29'; Chatzopoulos 37'; Karagiozopoulos (yellow card) 50'	Stadium: Karaiskakis Stadium; Attendance: 19,797; Referee: Stefanos Tsirikidis (Thessaloniki)

12 April 1986 28	AEK Athens	4–1	Iraklis	Marousi
18:00 EEST (UTC+3)	Pias (yellow card) 19'; Ballis (yellow card) 25', (goal) 51'; Karagiozopoulos 26'; Esterházy (yellow card) 39'; Sandberg 66', 72' (pen.)		L. Papaioannou 89' (pen.)	Stadium: Olympic Stadium; Attendance: 29,834; Referee: Giannis Batras (Karditsa)

20 April 1986 29	Panserraikos	2–0	AEK Athens	Serres
17:00 EEST (UTC+3)	Jarůšek (yellow card); Pantsios (yellow card); Gekas 14'; Galatidis 50' (pen.)		Mavros (yellow card)	Stadium: Serres Municipal Stadium; Attendance: 11,390; Referee: Stavros Zakestidis (Thessaloniki)

27 April 1986 30	AEK Athens	0–0	Panathinaikos	Marousi
17:00 EEST (UTC+3)	Papaioannou (yellow card) 4'; Karagiozopoulos (yellow card) 20'; Manolas (yellow card) 56'; Patikas (yellow card) 73'		Patsiavouras (yellow card) 72'	Stadium: Olympic Stadium; Attendance: 64,542; Referee: Giannis Triantafyllou (Dodecanese)

==== Third place play-off ====
23 June 1986 Play-off match	AEK Athens	2–0 (Awarded)	Iraklis	Volos
20:10 EEST (UTC+3)	Karaiskos (yellow card) 4' (yellow-red card) 45'; Zifkas (red card) 24'	Report	Sandberg (yellow card) 17'; Pias (red card) 24'	Stadium: Volos Municipal Stadium; Attendance: 10,000; Referee: Giannis Triantafyllou (Dodecanese)
Note: Iraklis, who tried to make parody of the match showed up with ten players, who entered the pitch in pairs, causing a 10-minute delay in the kick-off. Shortly before the match began, Zifkas was injured in the warm-up and Iraklis started the match with 9 players. At the 19th minute Zifkas entered the match and 5 minutes later kicked Pias who retaliated and both were sent-off. Karaiskos who was booked from the 4th minute, executed every free-kick of Iraklis and he always delayed. At the 45th minute he went to execute a foul and provocatively did not allow the game to be continued. Before the referee approached him to show him the second yellow, he left by himself for the changing rooms and Iraklis were left with 8 players. At the 51st minute, Santexis fell to the ground and was carried off the pitch on a stretcher. 3 minutes later, Adamou tackled Stafylidis and he himself fell to the ground, suffering. He came out with a stretcher and after a 6-minute break Adamou said that he could not continue, resulting in Iraklis were left with 6 players. By regulation, the match was awarded by 2–0 to AEK.

=== Greek Cup ===
==== Matches ====
6 November 1985 First round	AEK Athens	10–0	Ilioupoli	Marousi
15:00 EET (UTC+2)	Esterházy 15', 27', 38'; Ballis 18', 63'; Dintsikos 41', 86'; Karagiozopoulos 45'; Sandberg 53' (pen.), 61'	Report		Stadium: Olympic Stadium; Attendance: 1,653; Referee: Nikos Kapetanakis (Piraeus)

===== Round of 32 =====
4 December 1985 First leg	AEK Athens	1–1	Kallithea	Marousi
14:45 EET (UTC+2)	Armodoros (yellow card) 54'; Sandberg 75'	Report	Nikolaidis 28'; Korobelis (yellow card) 52'	Stadium: Olympic Stadium; Attendance: 2,574; Referee: Giorgos Amygdalis (Serres)

29 December 1985 Second leg	Kallithea	0–1 (1–2 agg.)	AEK Athens	Kallithea
14:15 EET (UTC+2)	Nikolaidis (yellow card) 67'; Karagiorgas (yellow card) 73'	Report	Dintsikos 27'; Ballis (yellow card) 75'	Stadium: Grigoris Lamprakis Stadium; Attendance: 5,650; Referee: Giannis Iatropoulos (Piraeus)

===== Round of 16 =====
22 January 1986 First leg	Chalkida	1–2	AEK Athens	Chalcis
15:00 EET (UTC+2)	Vagenas (yellow card) 21'; Merditis (yellow card) 52'; Koulouris 72'	Report	Esterházy 53', 80'; Sandberg (yellow card) 58'	Stadium: Municipal Stadium of Chalkida; Attendance: 11,104; Referee: Lampros Michailidis (Piraeus)

12 February 1986 Second leg	AEK Athens	2–0 (4–1 agg.)	Chalkida	Marousi
14:45 EET (UTC+2)	Esterházy 28'; Manolas 62'	Report		Stadium: Olympic Stadium; Attendance: 1,454; Referee: Petros Kalpakidis (Thessaloniki)

===== Quarter-finals =====
12 March 1986 First leg	AEK Athens	3–0	Panachaiki	Marousi
16:00 EET (UTC+2)	Sandberg 14'; Stylianopoulos 37'; Stafylidis (yellow card) 65'; Chatzopoulos (yellow card) 78'; Christodoulou 84'	Report	Zerdevas (yellow card) 51'; Filippopoulos (yellow card) 57'	Stadium: Olympic Stadium; Attendance: 12,677; Referee: Stavros Zakestidis (Thessaloniki)

9 April 1986 Second leg	Panachaiki	1–0 (1–3 agg.)	AEK Athens	Patras
16:00 EEST (UTC+3)	Dalakas 52'		Armodoros (yellow card) 42'	Stadium: Panachaiki Stadium; Attendance: 5,293; Referee: Orestis Pavlidis (Dodecanese)

===== Semi-finals =====
11 May 1986 First leg	AEK Athens	2–2	Panathinaikos	Marousi
21:00 EEST (UTC+3)	Manolas (yellow card) 11'; Patikas 17', 24', (yellow card) 27'; Sandberg (yellow card) 30' (yellow-red card) 90'; Stafylidis (yellow card) 47'		Zajec 35'; Gerothodoros (yellow card) 36'; Vlachos (yellow card) 47'; Batsinilas 59'; Minou (yellow card) 86'	Stadium: Olympic Stadium; Attendance: 52,284; Referee: Kostas Dimitriadis (Piraeus)

21 May 1986 Second leg	Panathinaikos	2–1 (4–3 agg.)	AEK Athens	Marousi
20:30 EEST (UTC+3)	Saravakos 33'; Batsinilas 42'; Dimopoulos (yellow card) 53'; Vamvakoulas (yellow card) 60'		Papaioannou (yellow card) 4'; Karagiozopoulos 11' (pen.); Stafylidis (yellow card) 14'; Manolas (yellow card) 33'; Ballis (yellow card) 82' (yellow-red card) 90'	Stadium: Olympic Stadium; Attendance: 50,000; Referee: Vassilios Nikakis (Aetoloacarnania)

=== UEFA Cup ===
==== First round ====
18 September 1985 First leg	AEK Athens (Greece)	1–0	(Spain) Real Madrid	Athens, Greece
21:00 EEST (UTC+3)	Papaioannou 10'; Georgamlis (yellow card) 69'; Chatzopoulos (yellow card) 78'	Report		Stadium: Athens Olympic Stadium; Attendance: 39,819; Referee: Ioan Igna (Romania)

2 October 1985 Second leg	Real Madrid (Spain)	5–0 (5–1 agg.)	(Greece) AEK Athens	Madrid, Spain
20:00 EEST (UTC+3)	Georgamlis 8' (o.g.); Butragueño 18'; Chendo 20'; Sanchís (yellow card) 21'; Valdano 32'; Sánchez 59'	Report	Sandberg (yellow card) 18'	Stadium: Santiago Bernabéu Stadium; Attendance: 85,000; Referee: Alain Delmer (France)

== Statistics ==
=== Squad statistics ===
As of 23 June 1986

No.	Pos	Player	Alpha Ethniki		Greek Cup		UEFA Cup		Total	
No.	Pos	Player	Apps	Goals	Apps	Goals	Apps	Goals	Apps	Goals
Goalkeepers
—	GK	(Greece) Spyros Ikonomopoulos	1	0	2	0	0	0	3	0
—	GK	(Greece) Theologis Papadopoulos	23	0	7	0	0	0	30	0
Defenders
—	DF	(Greece) Makis Chatzis	24	0	7	0	2	0	33	0
—	DF	(Greece) Panagiotis Stylianopoulos	14	0	5	1	0	0	19	1
—	DF	(Greece) Ilias Armodoros	25	0	8	0	2	0	35	0
—	DF	(Greece) Takis Karagiozopoulos	25	1	7	2	2	0	34	3
—	DF	(Greece) Polyvios Chatzopoulos	19	1	8	0	2	0	29	1
—	DF	(Greece) Stelios Manolas	20	3	7	1	2	0	29	4
—	DF	(Greece) Stefanos Porfyris	2	0	3	0	0	0	5	0
Midfielders
—	MF	(Greece) Pavlos Dimitriou	15	0	5	0	0	0	20	0
—	MF	(Greece) Dinos Ballis	22	4	7	2	1	0	30	6
—	MF	(Greece) Pavlos Papaioannou	27	0	6	0	2	1	35	1
—	MF	(Greece) Nikos Pias	24	0	6	0	2	0	32	0
—	MF	(Greece) Babis Akrivopoulos	5	0	0	0	1	0	6	0
—	MF	(Australia) Jim Patikas	12	0	3	2	0	0	15	2
—	MF	(Greece) Dimitris Stafylidis	11	1	8	0	0	0	19	1
Forwards
—	FW	(Greece) Thomas Mavros	17	4	4	0	1	0	22	4
—	FW	(Hungary) Márton Esterházy	29	11	6	6	2	0	37	17
—	FW	(Sweden) Håkan Sandberg	29	12	6	4	2	0	37	16
—	FW	(Greece) Andreas Voitsidis	13	0	5	0	0	0	18	0
—	FW	(Greece) Giannis Dintsikos	20	5	4	3	1	0	25	8
—	FW	(Greece) Georgios Christodoulou	6	0	2	1	0	0	8	1
Left during Winter Transfer Window
—	GK	(Greece) Christos Arvanitis	7	0	0	0	2	0	9	0
—	DF	(Greece) Lysandros Georgamlis	7	0	1	0	2	0	10	0
—	MF	(Greece) Vangelis Vlachos	0	0	0	0	0	0	0	0
—	FW	(Greece) Michalis Pytharoulis	0	0	0	0	0	0	0	0

=== Goalscorers ===
As of 23 June 1986
The list is sorted by competition order when total goals are equal, then by position and then alphabetically by surname.

Rank	Pos.	Player	Alpha Ethniki	Greek Cup	UEFA Cup	Total
1	FW	(Hungary) Márton Esterházy	11	6	0	17
2	FW	(Sweden) Håkan Sandberg	12	4	0	16
3	FW	(Greece) Giannis Dintsikos	5	3	0	8
4	MF	(Greece) Dinos Ballis	4	2	0	6
5	FW	(Greece) Thomas Mavros	4	0	0	4
5	DF	(Greece) Stelios Manolas	3	1	0	4
7	DF	(Greece) Takis Karagiozopoulos	1	2	0	3
8	MF	(Australia) Jim Patikas	0	2	0	2
9	DF	(Greece) Polyvios Chatzopoulos	1	0	0	1
9	MF	(Greece) Dimitris Stafylidis	1	0	0	1
9	DF	(Greece) Panagiotis Stylianopoulos	0	1	0	1
9	FW	(Greece) Georgios Christodoulou	0	1	0	1
9	MF	(Greece) Pavlos Papaioannou	0	0	1	1
Own goals			0	0	0	0
Totals			42	22	1	65

=== Hat-tricks ===
Numbers in superscript represent the goals that the player scored.

Player	Against	Result	Date	Competition	Source
(Hungary) Márton Esterházy	(Greece) Ilioupoli	10–0 (H)	6 November 1985	Greek Cup	

=== Clean sheets ===
As of 23 June 1986
The list is sorted by competition order when total clean sheets are equal and then alphabetically by surname. Clean sheets in games where both goalkeepers participated are awarded to the goalkeeper who started the game. Goalkeepers with no appearances are not included.

Rank	Player	Alpha Ethniki	Greek Cup	UEFA Cup	Total
1	(Greece) Theologis Papadopoulos	10	3	0	13
2	(Greece) Christos Arvanitis	2	0	1	3
3	(Greece) Spyros Ikonomopoulos	0	1	0	1
Totals		12	4	1	17

=== Disciplinary record ===
As of 23 June 1986

N	P	Nat.	Name	Alpha Ethniki			Greek Cup			UEFA Cup			Total			Notes
N	P	Nat.	Name	Yellow card	Second yellow card	Red card	Yellow card	Second yellow card	Red card	Yellow card	Second yellow card	Red card	Yellow card	Second yellow card	Red card	Notes
Goalkeepers
—	GK	(Greece)	Spyros Ikonomopoulos													
—	GK	(Greece)	Theologis Papadopoulos													
Defenders
—	DF	(Greece)	Makis Chatzis	2									2			
—	DF	(Greece)	Panagiotis Stylianopoulos	1									1			
—	DF	(Greece)	Ilias Armodoros	3			2						5			
—	DF	(Greece)	Takis Karagiozopoulos	7									7			
—	DF	(Greece)	Polyvios Chatzopoulos	3			1			1			5			
—	DF	(Greece)	Stelios Manolas	9			2						11			
—	DF	(Greece)	Stefanos Porfyris													
Midfielders
—	MF	(Greece)	Pavlos Dimitriou	2									2			
—	MF	(Greece)	Dinos Ballis	4		1	3	1					7	1	1	
—	MF	(Greece)	Pavlos Papaioannou	7	1		1						8	1		
—	MF	(Greece)	Nikos Pias	4		1							4		1	
—	MF	(Greece)	Babis Akrivopoulos													
—	MF	(Australia)	Jim Patikas	2			1						3			
—	MF	(Greece)	Dimitris Stafylidis	3			3						6			
Forwards
—	FW	(Greece)	Thomas Mavros	2									2			
—	FW	(Hungary)	Márton Esterházy	4									4			
—	FW	(Sweden)	Håkan Sandberg	8			3	1		1			12	1		
—	FW	(Greece)	Andreas Voitsidis	1									1			
—	FW	(Greece)	Giannis Dintsikos	2	1								2	1		
—	FW	(Greece)	Georgios Christodoulou													
Left during Winter Transfer Window
—	GK	(Greece)	Christos Arvanitis	1									1			
—	DF	(Greece)	Lysandros Georgamlis							1			1			
—	MF	(Greece)	Vangelis Vlachos													
—	FW	(Greece)	Michalis Pytharoulis													

=== Starting 11 ===
This section presents the most frequently used formation along with the players with the most starts across all competitions.

N.	Formation	Matchday(s)
42	4–4–2	1–30

Nat.	Player	Pos.
(Greece)	Theologis Papadopoulos (C)	GK
(Greece)	Stelios Manolas	RCB
(Greece)	Takis Karagiozopoulos	LCB
(Greece)	Makis Chatzis	RB
(Greece)	Ilias Armodoros	LB
(Greece)	Nikos Pias	RCM
(Greece)	Dinos Ballis	LCM
(Greece)	Pavlos Papaioannou	RM
(Hungary)	Márton Esterházy	LM
(Australia)	Jim Patikas	SS
(Sweden)	Håkan Sandberg	CF

Last updated: 1986-06-23
