= 1984–85 AEK Athens F.C. season =

AEK Athens
1984–85 season
- Chairman: Andreas Zafiropoulos
- Manager: Václav Halama (until 10 December); Antonis Georgiadis
- Stadium: AEK Stadium
- Alpha Ethniki: 3rd
- Greek Cup: First round
- Top goalscorer: League: Thomas Mavros (27); All: Thomas Mavros (27)
- Highest home attendance: 32,485 vs Olympiacos (12 May 1985)
- Lowest home attendance: 9,375 vs Apollon Athens (2 December 1984)
- Average home league attendance: 20,652
- Biggest win: AEK Athens 7–2 Pierikos
- Biggest defeat: AEL 4–1 AEK Athens
Home colours	Away colours

The 1984–85 season was the 61st season in the existence of AEK Athens F.C. and the 26th consecutive season in the top flight of Greek football. They competed in the Alpha Ethniki and the Greek Cup. The season began on 23 September 1984 and finished on 16 June 1985.

== Kits ==
Supplier: Zita Hellas
Sponsor(s): Nissan

Home	Away

== Overview ==
Since the middle of the previous season, Zafiropoulos had returned to the spotlight of the administrative activities of the club and assumed the presidency. The team continued to be in a state of competitive change. Petros Ravousis, one of the team's main players for 12 years, left and joined Levadiakos, while Takis Nikoloudis moved to Apollon Kalamarias, since the previous December. AEK were strengthened with the Swedish striker, Håkan Sandberg and the Czech midfielder, František Štambachr, while from the Greek market, they signed Nikos Pias, Theologis Papadopoulos, Andreas Voitsidis and Makis Chatzis. Zafiropoulos appointed Václav Halama, as the new manager, who had had previously managed Austria Wien and 1860 Munich. The Czech arrived with great ambition, while he was presented as a manager that controlled the locker rooms, however, these expectations were soon dashed.

AEK did not start well, even though they showed signs of being a highly attacking team on the pitch. In the first 10 games, the team achieved 4 wins, 5 draws and 1 defeat, while away from home they managed to win only once.

In the first round of the Cup, AEK were drawn Lamia away from home. At the home ground of Lamia, the team did not take the match seriously and at the 20th minute were left behind with a goal by Mantzikos. In the remaining minutes the players of AEK did not manage to do anything resulting in one of the most shocking eliminations in the club's history.

The negative results of the team led to intense disapproval from the supporters. Halama, who had lost control of the dressing room and was unable to handle the situation resigned from the club. Following the 10th matchday, Zafiropoulos replaced him with the former manager of Aris, Antonis Georgiadis. The club made changes to their roster, as well. During the winter transfer window, Štambachr left for Apollon Athens, as he occupied one of the club's foreigner slots, Stergioudas moved to PAOK, while Paraprastanitis and Kottis signed for Egaleo. On the other hand, the president of the yellow-blacks completed a major signing, as he signed the Hungarian international Márton Esterházy from Honvéd.

Esterházy quickly proved his value, as alongside Thomas Mavros and Håkan Sandberg formed a prolific attacking trio in the team's offense. The team played highly attacking football, while Mavros finished as the league's top scorer with 27 goals, while he and Sandberg combined for 42 of the team's 58 league goals. Nevertheless, despite AEK finishing the league with only three defeats, all of them away from home, they finished in third place, equaling the second Panathinaikos, 3 points behind PAOK.

== Management team ==
Position	Staff
Manager	(Greece) Antonis Georgiadis
Assistant manager	(Greece) Nikos Christidis
Goalkeeping coach	(Greece) Stelios Serafidis
Head of Medical	(Greece) Lakis Nikolaou

== Players ==
=== Squad information ===
NOTE: The players are the ones that have been announced by the AEK Athens' press release. No edits should be made unless a player arrival or exit is announced. Updated 16 June 1985, 23:59 UTC+3.

Player	Nat.	Position(s)	Date of birth (Age)	Signed	Previous club	Transfer fee	Contract until
Goalkeepers
Christos Arvanitis	(Greece)	GK	23 January 1953 (aged 32)	1982	(Greece) Olympiacos	₯7,000,000	1986
Spyros Ikonomopoulos	(Greece)	GK	25 July 1959 (aged 25)	1979	(Greece) AEK Athens U20	—	1989
Theologis Papadopoulos	(Greece)	GK	12 January 1960 (aged 25)	1984	(Greece) AEL	₯9,000,000	1989
Defenders
Makis Chatzis	(Greece)	RB / LB	30 March 1957 (aged 28)	1984	(Greece) Apollon Athens	₯6,750,000	1989
Stavros Letsas	(Greece)	RB / RM / CB	6 March 1957 (aged 28)	1979	(Greece) Agioi Anargyroi	Free	1986
Panagiotis Stylianopoulos	(Greece)	RB / LB / RM / DM	4 September 1957 (aged 27)	1978	(Greece) AEK Athens U20	—	1986
Pavlos Papaioannou	(Greece) (Brazil)	RB / LB / DM / RM	19 May 1959 (aged 26)	1983	(Greece) Rodos	₯10,000,000	1988
Takis Karagiozopoulos	(Greece)	CB / DM / ST	4 February 1961 (aged 24)	1981	(Greece) Veria	₯8,000,000	1986
Stelios Manolas	(Greece)	CB / RB	13 July 1961 (aged 23)	1980	(Greece) AEK Athens U20	—	1989
Lysandros Georgamlis	(Greece)	RB / CB / DM / LB	25 February 1962 (aged 23)	1980	(Greece) AEK Athens U20	—	1985
Dimos Tsimiliotis	(Greece)	CB	2 November 1966 (aged 18)	1984	(Greece) Anagennisi Mantoudi	₯2,000,000	1989
Midfielders
Christos Ardizoglou (Captain)	(Greece) (Israel)	RM / LM / RW / LW / AM / RB / LB	25 March 1953 (aged 32)	1974	(Greece) Apollon Athens	₯12,000,000	1986
Dinos Ballis	(Greece)	AM / CM / DM / SS / ST / CB	25 May 1957 (aged 28)	1981	(Greece) Aris	₯17,000,000	1986
Nikos Pias	(Greece)	CM / DM	7 April 1960 (aged 25)	1984	(Greece) Rodos	₯1,350,000	1989
Babis Akrivopoulos	(Greece)	AM / RM / LM / SS / ST	4 September 1961 (aged 23)	1983	(Greece) Veria	₯8,400,000	1988
Vangelis Vlachos (Vice-captain 2)	(Greece)	AM / CM / RM / LM	6 January 1962 (aged 23)	1979	(Greece) AEK Athens U20	—	1989
Forwards
Thomas Mavros (Vice-captain)	(Greece)	ST / LW	31 May 1954 (aged 31)	1976	(Greece) Panionios	₯10,000,000	1987
Márton Esterházy	(Hungary)	SS / AM / ST / RW / LW / RM / LM	9 April 1956 (aged 29)	1984	(Hungary) Honvéd	₯22,950,000	1986
Håkan Sandberg	(Sweden)	ST	27 July 1958 (aged 26)	1984	(Sweden) IFK Göteborg	₯8,000,000	1986
Andreas Voitsidis	(Greece)	ST / RW / LW	28 April 1960 (aged 25)	1984	(Greece) Kastoria	₯2,400,000	1989
Giannis Dintsikos	(Greece)	ST / SS / RW / LW / AM	25 June 1960 (aged 25)	1981	(Greece) Kastoria	₯20,000,000	1986
Michalis Pytharoulis	(Greece)	ST	1966 (aged 18–19)	1984	(Greece) A.O. Agios Nikolaos	Free	1989
Left during Winter Transfer Window
Lakis Stergioudas	(Greece)	GK	11 December 1952 (aged 32)	1972	(Greece) Niki Polygyros	₯36,000	1985
Vangelis Paraprastanitis	(Greece)	LB / CB / DM	10 February 1955 (aged 30)	1980	(Greece) Trikala	₯4,000,000	1985
František Štambachr	(Czechoslovakia)	LM / CM / AM	13 February 1953 (aged 32)	1984	(Czechoslovakia) Dukla Prague	₯14,000,000	1986
Manolis Kottis	(Greece)	ST / LW / RW	25 January 1955 (aged 30)	1980	(Greece) Rodos	₯7,500,000	1985

== Transfers ==
=== In ===
==== Summer ====
Pos.	Player	From	Fee	Date	Contract Until	Source
GK	(Greece) Theologis Papadopoulos	(Greece) AEL	₯9,000,000	22 June 1984	30 June 1989	
DF	(Greece) Dimos Tsimiliotis	(Greece) Anagennisi Mantoudi	₯2,000,000	10 July 1984	30 June 1989	
DF	(Greece) Makis Chatzis	(Greece) Apollon Athens	₯6,750,000	25 June 1984	30 June 1989	
MF	(Greece) Nikos Pias	(Greece) Rodos	₯1,350,000	29 June 1984	30 June 1989	
MF	(Czechoslovakia) František Štambachr	(Czechoslovakia) Dukla Prague	₯14,000,000	11 June 1984	30 June 1986	
FW	(Sweden) Håkan Sandberg	(Sweden) IFK Göteborg	₯8,000,000	5 July 1984	30 June 1986	
FW	(Greece) Andreas Voitsidis	(Greece) Kastoria	₯2,400,000	10 July 1984	30 June 1989	
FW	(Greece) Michalis Pytharoulis	(Greece) A.O. Agios Nikolaos	Free transfer	13 July 1984	30 June 1989	

==== Winter ====
Pos.	Player	From	Fee	Date	Contract Until	Source
FW	(Hungary) Márton Esterházy	(Hungary) Honvéd	₯22,950,000	12 December 1984	30 November 1986	

=== Out ===
==== Summer ====
Pos.	Player	To	Fee	Date	Source
DF	(Greece) Petros Ravousis	(Greece) Levadiakos	Contract termination	5 August 1984	
MF	(Greece) Spyros Thodis	(Greece) Anagennisi Karditsa	End of contract	4 August 1984	
MF	(Australia) George Christopoulos	(Australia) Canberra City	Loan termination	1 July 1984	
FW	(Greece) Giorgos Chatziioannidis	(Greece) PAS Giannina	₯2,800,000	16 July 1984	

==== Winter ====
Pos.	Player	To	Fee	Date	Source
GK	(Greece) Lakis Stergioudas	(Greece) PAOK	Contract termination	23 November 1984	
DF	(Greece) Vangelis Paraprastanitis	(Greece) Egaleo	₯500,000	17 December 1984	
MF	(Czechoslovakia) František Štambachr	(Greece) Apollon Athens	Contract termination	14 December 1984	
FW	(Greece) Manolis Kottis	(Greece) Egaleo	₯1,200,000	1 December 1984	

=== Contract renewals ===
Pos.	Player	Date	Former Exp. Date	New Exp. Date	Source
DF	(Greece) Stelios Manolas	23 November 1984	30 November 1984	30 November 1989	

=== Overall transfer activity ===
==== Expenditure ====
Summer: ▼ ₯43,500,000

Winter: ▼ ₯25,000,000

Total: ▼ ₯69,500,000

==== Income ====
Summer: ▲ ₯2,800,000

Winter: ▲ ₯1,700,000

Total: ▲ ₯4,500,000

==== Net Totals ====
Summer: ▼ ₯40,700,000

Winter: ▼ ₯23,300,000

Total: ▼ ₯64,000,000

== Pre-season and friendlies ==
15 July 1984 Friendly	Reide	1–2	AEK Athens
	Radmark 84'	Report	Dintsikos 17'; Mavros 50'

24 July 1984 Friendly	VfB Waltrop	1–1	AEK Athens	Duisburg
18:00 EEST (UTC+3)	71'	Report	Dintsikos 36'

25 July 1984 Friendly	Werder Bremen	5–3	AEK Athens	Hemmingen
18:30 EEST (UTC+3)	Neubarth 44', 54', 60'; Sidka 56'; Ordenewitz 81'	Report	Mavros 18'; Dintsikos 74', 89'	Attendance: 3,000

27 July 1984 Friendly	Viktoria Köln	0–2	AEK Athens	Köln
18:30 EEST (UTC+3)	Klimowitsch (yellow card) 20'; Ziegler (yellow card) 67'; Bandler (red card) 70'	Report	Mavros 69', 81' (pen.)	Referee: Jörg Frorath (West Germany)

1 August 1984 Friendly	AEK Athens	0–1	Bordeaux	Marousi
20:30 EEST (UTC+3)		Report	Audrain 84'	Stadium: Olympic Stadium; Attendance: 34,811; Referee: Kostas Dimitriadis (Piraeus)

6 August 1984 Friendly	AEK Athens	1–1	Honvéd	Nea Filadelfeia
21:00 EEST (UTC+3)	Mavros (penalty missed) , 11'; Sandberg 73'	Report	Sikesdi 28'	Stadium: AEK Stadium; Attendance: 7,495; Referee: Makis Germanakos (Athens)

13 August 1984 Friendly	AEK Athens	2–1	Dukla Prague	Nea Filadelfeia
21:00 EEST (UTC+3)	Mavros 36', 47'	Report	Belák 65'	Stadium: AEK Stadium; Attendance: 5,588; Referee: Stelios Landrakis (Athens)

20 August 1984 Friendly	AEK Athens	0–0	Iraklis	Nea Filadelfeia
21:00 EEST (UTC+3)		Report		Stadium: AEK Stadium; Attendance: 11,039; Referee: Vassilios Nikakis (Aetoloacarnania)

27 August 1984 Friendly	AEK Athens	6–2	OFI	Nea Filadelfeia
21:00 EEST (UTC+3)	Sandberg 3' (pen.), 61'; Dintsikos 11'; Mavros 22', 59'; Pytharoulis 84'	Report	Christofis 63'; Bitakos 82'	Stadium: AEK Stadium; Attendance: 6,932; Referee: Meletis Voutsaras (Athens)

3 September 1984 Friendly	Olympiacos	1–2	AEK Athens	Marousi
20:30 EEST (UTC+3)	Togias 65'	Report	Voitsidis 54'; Dintsikos 59'	Stadium: Olympic Stadium; Attendance: 38,887; Referee: Stavros Zakestidis (Thessaloniki)

7 September 1984 Friendly	Iraklis	0–0	AEK Athens	Thessaloniki
20:45 EET (UTC+2)		Report	Dintsikos (penalty missed) 80'	Stadium: Kaftanzoglio Stadium; Attendance: 3,555; Referee: Petros Kalpakidis (Thessaloniki)

9 September 1984 Friendly	AEK Athens	5–0	Panachaiki	Nea Filadelfeia
20:30 EEST (UTC+3)	Zarikos 9'; Voitsidis 12'; Ardizoglou 23'; Vlachos 69', 78'	Report	Kizas (yellow card) 71'	Stadium: AEK Stadium; Attendance: 2,024; Referee: Vangelatos (Patras)

12 September 1984 Friendly	Panelefsiniakos	0–3	AEK Athens	Elefsina
17:30 EEST (UTC+3)	Roumeliotis (penalty missed) 47'	Report	Pias 33'; Pytharoulis 86', 87'	Stadium: Municipal Stadium of Elefsina; Referee: Vasiliou (Piraeus)

15 December 1984 Friendly	AEK Athens	4–0	PAO Thriamvos Athens	Nea Filadelfeia
14:45 EET (UTC+2)	Dintsikos 5', 57', 79'; Vlachos 63'	Report		Stadium: AEK Stadium; Attendance: 2,000; Referee: Loizos (Athens)

23 January 1985 Friendly	AEK Athens	5–0	Vyzas Megara	Nea Filadelfeia
15:00 EET (UTC+2)	Dintsikos 13' (pen.); Pytharoulis 34', 52'; Pias 58'; Akrivopoulos 64'	Report		Stadium: AEK Stadium; Attendance: 1,500; Referee: Nikos Makris (Athens)

28 February 1985 Friendly	AEK Athens	2–3	Egaleo	Nea Filadelfeia
15:30 EET (UTC+2)	Sandberg 16'; Mavros 38' (pen.)	Report	Kottis 31', 40'; Klis 74'	Stadium: AEK Stadium; Attendance: 2,000; Referee: Makis Germanakos (Athens)

10 April 1985 Friendly	AEK Athens	1–0	Ethnikos Asteras	Nea Filadelfeia
18:00 EET (UTC+2)	Ardizoglou 87'	Report		Stadium: AEK Stadium; Attendance: 500; Referee: Kouvlakis

17 April 1985 Friendly	AEK Athens	5–0	Euboea amateurs	Nea Filadelfeia
18:00 EET (UTC+2)	Sandberg 41', 61', 85', 88' (pen.); Akrivopoulos 47' (pen.)	Report		Stadium: AEK Stadium; Attendance: 1,000; Referee: Nikos Christidis

== Competitions ==
=== Overall record ===
Competition	First match	Last match	Starting round	Final position	Record							
Competition	First match	Last match	Starting round	Final position	Pld	W	D	L	GF	GA	GD	Win %
Alpha Ethniki	23 September 1984	16 June 1985	Matchday 1	3rd	30	16	11	3	58	29	+29	53.33
Greek Cup	31 October 1984	31 October 1984	First round	First round	1	0	0	1	0	1	−1	0.00
Total					31	16	11	4	58	30	+28	51.61

Last updated: 16 June 1985
Source: Competitions

=== Alpha Ethniki ===
==== League table ====
Pos	Team	Pld	W	D	L	GF	GA	GD	Pts	Qualification or relegation
1	PAOK (C)	30	19	8	3	54	26	+28	46	Qualification for European Cup first round
2	Panathinaikos	30	17	9	4	61	30	+31	43	Qualification for UEFA Cup first round
3	AEK Athens	30	16	11	3	58	29	+29	43	Qualification for UEFA Cup first round
4	Olympiacos	30	17	8	5	53	23	+30	42	
5	Iraklis	30	19	3	8	59	33	+26	41	

Source: RSSSF
Rules for classification: 1st points; 2nd head-to-head points; 3rd head-to-head goal difference; 4th decision match.
(C) Champions

==== Results summary ====
Overall								Home						Away					
Pld	W	D	L	GF	GA	GD	Pts	W	D	L	GF	GA	GD	W	D	L	GF	GA	GD
30	16	11	3	58	29	+29	43	11	4	0	42	15	+27	5	7	3	16	14	+2

Source: Competitive matches

==== Results by Matchday ====
Round	1	2	3	4	5	6	7	8	9	10	11	12	13	14	15	16	17	18	19	20	21	22	23	24	25	26	27	28	29	30
Ground	A	H	A	H	H	A	H	A	H	A	H	A	A	H	A	H	A	H	A	A	H	A	H	A	H	A	H	H	A	H
Result	D	W	D	W	D	W	D	L	W	D	W	W	D	W	L	W	L	W	W	D	W	D	D	W	W	W	D	W	D	W
Position	8	7	8	5	4	5	3	6	5	5	5	3	3	3	3	3	4	4	4	5	5	5	5	4	3	3	3	3	3	3

Source: Competitive matches
A = Away; H = Home; W = Win; D = Draw; L = Loss; P = Postponed

==== Matches ====
23 September 1984 1	Egaleo	0–0	AEK Athens	Aigaleo
17:00 EEST (UTC+3)	Stojanović (yellow card) 43'		Ballis (yellow card) 69'	Stadium: Aigaleo Municipal Stadium; Attendance: 12,685; Referee: Giannis Iatropoulos (Piraeus)

30 September 1984 2	AEK Athens	2–1	Iraklis	Nea Filadelfeia
16:00 EEST (UTC+3)	Ardizoglou 13'; Sandberg 24'; Karagiozopoulos (yellow card) 86'		Georgiev (yellow card) 13'; Xanthopoulos (yellow card) 13'; Orfanidis (yellow card) 80'; Hatzipanagis 86' (pen.)	Stadium: AEK Stadium; Attendance: 27,841; Referee: Panagiotis Anastasopoulos (Athens)

7 October 1984 3	Panachaiki	1–1	AEK Athens	Patras
15:30 EEST (UTC+3)	Spanosotiropoulos 10'; Patronis (yellow card) 45'		Mavros 48'; Stylianopoulos (yellow card) 79'	Stadium: Panachaiki Stadium; Attendance: 15,131; Referee: Antonis Vassaras (Thessaloniki)

21 October 1984 4	AEK Athens	7–2	Pierikos	Nea Filadelfeia
15:30 EEST (UTC+3)	Dintsikos 9', 16', 63'; Sandberg 11', 60'; Mavros 25' (pen.), 57' (pen.); Ardizoglou (red card) 87'		Skentos (yellow card); Babović 81'; Anagnostou 82'	Stadium: AEK Stadium; Attendance: 10,946; Referee: Giorgos Koukoulakis (Heraklion)

4 November 1984 5	AEK Athens	2–2	PAOK	Nea Filadelfeia
15:00 EET (UTC+2)	Dintsikos (yellow card) 16'; Tsourelas 30' (o.g.); Manolas (yellow card) 44'; Mavros 70'		Skartados 22'; Tsourelas (yellow card) 31'; Alexandridis (yellow card) 39'; Iosifidis (yellow card) 45'; Baniotis (yellow card) 80'; Singas 90'	Stadium: AEK Stadium; Attendance: 23,356; Referee: Tasos Kantartzis (Thessaloniki)

11 November 1984 6	OFI	1–2	AEK Athens	Heraklion
15:00 EET (UTC+2)	Tsitsios (yellow card); Tsinos 35'		Sandberg (yellow card); Letsas (yellow card); Karagiozopoulos (yellow card); Mavros 22' (pen.), 81'	Stadium: Ergotelis Stadium; Attendance: 8,050; Referee: Giorgos Saraliotis (Kavala)

18 November 1984 7	AEK Athens	1–1	Panionios	Nea Filadelfeia
15:00 EET (UTC+2)	Sandberg 10', (yellow card) 88'; Vlachos (yellow card) 43'; Stylianopoulos (yellow card) 90'		Lazarou (yellow card) 54'; Chatzopoulos 79'	Stadium: AEK Stadium; Attendance: 23,498; Referee: Panagiotis Koutris (Thessaloniki)

25 November 1984 8	Panathinaikos	3–2	AEK Athens	Marousi
15:00 EET (UTC+2)	Dimopoulos (yellow card); Antoniou 5'; Saravakos 75'; Charalampidis 84'		Sandberg 33', 38'	Stadium: Olympic Stadium; Attendance: 72,732; Referee: Kostas Adamopoulos (Athens)

2 December 1984 9	AEK Athens	3–0	Apollon Athens	Nea Filadelfeia
14:45 EET (UTC+2)	Mavros 22', 36', 62'		Fabiatos (yellow card) 82'	Stadium: AEK Stadium; Attendance: 9,375; Referee: Stefanos Tsirikidis (Thessaloniki)

9 December 1984 10	Aris	0–0	AEK Athens	Thessaloniki
14:45 EET (UTC+2)	Papaioannou (yellow card) 8'			Stadium: Aris Stadium; Attendance: 12,274; Referee: Giannis Batras (Karditsa)

23 December 1984 11	AEK Athens	4–1	Ethnikos Piraeus	Nea Filadelfeia
14:45 EET (UTC+2)	Sandberg 58'; Pias 70'; Mavros 75'; Esterházy 88'		Peppes (yellow card); Moukeas (yellow card); Pittas 60'	Stadium: AEK Stadium; Attendance: 20,734; Referee: Kyriakos Kontogiannidis (Thrace)

30 December 1984 12	Olympiacos	0–1	AEK Athens	Marousi
14:45 EET (UTC+2)	Kousoulakis (yellow card); Šestić (yellow card) 41'; Albertsen (yellow card) 75'		Papaioannou (yellow card); Mavros 78'	Stadium: Olympic Stadium; Attendance: 72,153; Referee: Giorgos Sofianidis (Thessaloniki)

6 January 1985 13	Doxa Drama	0–0	AEK Athens	Drama
14:45 EET (UTC+2)	Kontos (yellow card) 83'			Stadium: Doxa Drama Stadium; Attendance: 8,330; Referee: Kostas Adamopoulos (Athens)

13 January 1985 14	AEK Athens	1–0	Apollon Kalamarias	Nea Filadelfeia
14:45 EET (UTC+2)	Ballis (yellow card) 75'; Dintsikos 79'; Manolas (yellow card) 81'		Bourdamis (yellow card) 64'	Stadium: AEK Stadium; Attendance: 17,653; Referee: Giorgos Koukoulakis (Heraklion)

20 January 1985 15	AEL	4–1	AEK Athens	Larissa
14:45 EET (UTC+2)	Mitsibonas 37'; Kmiecik 49'; Ardizoglou 53' (o.g.); Ziogas 78'; Voutiritsas (yellow card) 81'		Ballis (yellow card) 19' (yellow-red card) 82'; Esterházy 46'	Stadium: Alcazar Stadium; Attendance: 16,890; Referee: Kyriakos Kontogiannidis (Thrace)

27 January 1985 16	AEK Athens	5–2	Egaleo	Nea Filadelfeia
14:45 EET (UTC+2)	T. Mavros 40', 46', 56', 63', 70'		Pantazis 21'; D. Mavros (yellow card) 58'; Nikić 76'	Stadium: AEK Stadium; Attendance: 14,903; Referee: Kostas Dimitriadis (Piraeus)
Note: Thomas Mavros became the 8th footballer to score 5 goals in a single match, since the establishment of the championship as a national division and the second player of AEK, after Kostas Nestoridis. It was the second time that Mavros scored 5 goals for AEK, after a Cup game against Irodotos on 20 April 1983.

3 February 1985 17	Iraklis	1–0	AEK Athens	Thessaloniki
14:45 EET (UTC+2)	Hatzipanagis 33' (pen.); Karaiskos (yellow card) 36'		Letsas (yellow card) 13'; Ardizoglou (yellow card) 31'; Arvanitis (yellow card) 31'; Chatzis (yellow card) 69'; Ballis (yellow card) 76'	Stadium: Kaftanzoglio Stadium; Attendance: 18,864; Referee: Stavros Zakestidis (Thessaloniki)

10 February 1985 18	AEK Athens	5–1	Panachaiki	Nea Filadelfeia
15:30 EET (UTC+2)	Mavros (penalty missed) 2', 48'; Sandberg 27', 36', 63'; Vlachos 71'		Georgakopoulos (yellow card) 25'; Chardalias 49' (pen.)	Stadium: AEK Stadium; Attendance: 19,267; Referee: Tasos Kaklamanos (Arcadia)

17 February 1985 19	Pierikos	0–2	AEK Athens	Katerini
15:30 EET (UTC+2)			Mavros 35' (pen.), 71'	Stadium: Katerini Stadium; Attendance: 5,506; Referee: Stelios Landrakis (Athens)
Note: The second half began with a 10-minute delay due to the referee's fault.

10 March 1985 20	PAOK	1–1	AEK Athens	Thessaloniki
16:00 EET (UTC+2)	Dimopoulos 60'		Chatzis (yellow card) 23'; Ballis (yellow card) 27'; Sandberg (yellow card) 36'; Esterházy 46'	Stadium: Toumba Stadium; Attendance: 40,506; Referee: Stefanos Tsirikidis (Thessaloniki)

17 March 1985 21	AEK Athens	2–1	OFI	Nea Filadelfeia
16:00 EET (UTC+2)	Pias 30'; Mavros 74'; Stylianopoulos (yellow card) 85'		Goulis (yellow card); Tzirakis (yellow card); Konstantinidis (yellow card); Janjanin 60'	Stadium: AEK Stadium; Attendance: 25,090; Referee: Tasos Kantartzis (Thessaloniki)

31 March 1985 22	Panionios	0–0	AEK Athens	Nea Smyrni
17:00 EEST (UTC+3)	Lima (yellow card) 60'		Karagiozopoulos (yellow card) 82'	Stadium: Nea Smyrni Stadium; Attendance: 17,825; Referee: Meletis Voutsaras (Athens)

7 April 1985 23	AEK Athens	1–1	Panathinaikos	Nea Filadelfeia
17:00 EEST (UTC+3)	Pias 59'		Kyrastas (yellow card) 42'; Saravakos 49'	Stadium: AEK Stadium; Attendance: 32,341; Referee: Stavros Zakestidis (Thessaloniki)

21 April 1985 24	Apollon Athens	1–2	AEK Athens	Rizoupoli
17:00 EEST (UTC+3)	Mangioros (yellow card) 35'; Fabiatos (yellow card) 57'; Alexiou 74' (pen.)		Mavros 19'; Pias 39'	Stadium: Rizoupoli Stadium; Attendance: 14,152; Referee: Giorgos Sofianidis (Thessaloniki)

28 April 1985 25	AEK Athens	3–1	Aris	Nea Filadelfeia
17:00 EET (UTC+2)	Mavros 66' (pen.), 71', 82'		Chatziioannidis (yellow card) 54'; Bibisidis 59'; Tzifopoulos (yellow card) 75'	Stadium: AEK Stadium; Attendance: 21,470; Referee: Lambros Michailidis (Piraeus)

5 May 1985 26	Ethnikos Piraeus	1–3	AEK Athens	Piraeus
17:30 EEST (UTC+3)	Pittas 89'		Dintsikos (yellow card); Sandberg 27', 55', 66'	Stadium: Karaiskakis Stadium; Attendance: 27,332; Referee: Kostas Dimitriadis (Piraeus)

12 May 1985 27	AEK Athens	1–1	Olympiacos	Nea Filadelfeia
17:30 EEST (UTC+3)	Sandberg 63', (yellow card)		Sarganis (yellow card); Persias 57'	Stadium: AEK Stadium; Attendance: 32,485; Referee: Dimitris Naoum (Thessaloniki)

26 May 1985 28	AEK Athens	2–0	Doxa Drama	Nea Filadelfeia
17:30 EEST (UTC+3)	Mavros 17'; Dintsikos 71'		Vasilakakis (yellow card)	Stadium: AEK Stadium; Attendance: 11,700; Referee: Nikos Karathanasis (Athens)

9 June 1985 29	Apollon Kalamarias	1–1	AEK Athens	Thessaloniki
17:30 EEST (UTC+3)	Savvakis 36'; Simeunović (yellow card) 87'		Ballis (yellow card) 2'; Karagiozopoulos 43'	Stadium: Aris Stadium; Attendance: 4,057; Referee: Nikos Andreou (Athens)

16 June 1985 30	AEK Athens	3–1	AEL	Nea Filadelfeia
17:30 EEST (UTC+3)	Mavros 49' (pen.), 80'; Pias (yellow card) 52'; Sandberg 61'		Mitsibonas (yellow card) 4'; Adamczyk (yellow card) 43'; Ziogas 87'	Stadium: AEK Stadium; Attendance: 19,039; Referee: Giannis Iatropoulos (Athens)

=== Greek Cup ===
31 October 1984 First round	Lamia	1–0	AEK Athens	Lamia
14:30 EET (UTC+2)	Mantzikos 20'	Report		Stadium: Lamia Municipal Stadium; Attendance: 7,131; Referee: Kostas Lappas (Karditsa)

== Statistics ==
=== Squad statistics ===
As of 16 June 1985

No.	Pos	Player	Alpha Ethniki		Greek Cup		Total	
No.	Pos	Player	Apps	Goals	Apps	Goals	Apps	Goals
Goalkeepers
—	GK	(Greece) Christos Arvanitis	14	0	0	0	14	0
—	GK	(Greece) Spyros Ikonomopoulos	2	0	0	0	2	0
—	GK	(Greece) Theologis Papadopoulos	15	0	1	0	16	0
Defenders
—	DF	(Greece) Makis Chatzis	27	0	1	0	28	0
—	DF	(Greece) Stavros Letsas	3	0	0	0	3	0
—	DF	(Greece) Panagiotis Stylianopoulos	26	0	0	0	26	0
—	DF	(Greece) Pavlos Papaioannou	20	0	0	0	20	0
—	DF	(Greece) Takis Karagiozopoulos	25	1	1	0	26	1
—	DF	(Greece) Stelios Manolas	25	0	1	0	26	0
—	DF	(Greece) Lysandros Georgamlis	24	0	1	0	25	0
—	DF	(Greece) Dimos Tsimiliotis	0	0	0	0	0	0
Midfielders
—	MF	(Greece) Christos Ardizoglou	14	1	0	0	14	1
—	MF	(Greece) Dinos Ballis	29	0	1	0	30	0
—	MF	(Greece) Nikos Pias	14	4	0	0	14	4
—	MF	(Greece) Babis Akrivopoulos	8	0	0	0	8	0
—	MF	(Greece) Vangelis Vlachos	18	1	1	0	19	1
Forwards
—	FW	(Greece) Thomas Mavros	29	27	0	0	29	27
—	FW	(Hungary) Márton Esterházy	20	3	0	0	20	3
—	FW	(Sweden) Håkan Sandberg	29	15	1	0	30	15
—	FW	(Greece) Andreas Voitsidis	7	0	1	0	8	0
—	FW	(Greece) Giannis Dintsikos	22	5	1	0	23	5
—	FW	(Greece) Michalis Pytharoulis	0	0	1	0	1	0
Left during Winter Transfer Window
—	GK	(Greece) Lakis Stergioudas	0	0	0	0	0	0
—	DF	(Greece) Vangelis Paraprastanitis	1	0	0	0	1	0
—	MF	(Czechoslovakia) František Štambachr	9	0	1	0	10	0
—	FW	(Greece) Manolis Kottis	0	0	0	0	0	0

=== Goalscorers ===
As of 16 June 1985
The list is sorted by competition order when total goals are equal, then by position and then alphabetically by surname.

Rank	Pos.	Player	Alpha Ethniki	Greek Cup	Total
1	FW	(Greece) Thomas Mavros	27	0	27
2	FW	(Sweden) Håkan Sandberg	15	0	15
3	FW	(Greece) Giannis Dintsikos	5	0	5
4	MF	(Greece) Nikos Pias	4	0	4
5	FW	(Hungary) Márton Esterházy	3	0	3
6	DF	(Greece) Takis Karagiozopoulos	1	0	1
6	MF	(Greece) Christos Ardizoglou	1	0	1
6	MF	(Greece) Vangelis Vlachos	1	0	1
Own goals			1	0	1
Totals			58	0	58

=== Hat-tricks ===
Numbers in superscript represent the goals that the player scored.

Player	Against	Result	Date	Competition	Source
(Greece) Giannis Dintsikos	(Greece) Pierikos	7–2 (H)	21 October 1984	Alpha Ethniki	
(Greece) Thomas Mavros	(Greece) Apollon Athens	3–0 (H)	2 December 1984	Alpha Ethniki	
(Greece) Thomas Mavros^{5}	(Greece) Egaleo	5–2 (H)	27 January 1985	Alpha Ethniki	
(Sweden) Håkan Sandberg	(Greece) Panachaiki	5–1 (H)	10 February 1985	Alpha Ethniki	
(Greece) Thomas Mavros	(Greece) Aris	3–1 (H)	28 April 1985	Alpha Ethniki	
(Sweden) Håkan Sandberg	(Greece) Ethnikos Piraeus	3–1 (A)	5 May 1985	Alpha Ethniki	

=== Clean sheets ===
As of 16 June 1985
The list is sorted by competition order when total clean sheets are equal and then alphabetically by surname. Clean sheets in games where both goalkeepers participated are awarded to the goalkeeper who started the game. Goalkeepers with no appearances are not included.

Rank	Player	Alpha Ethniki	Greek Cup	Total
1	(Greece) Theologis Papadopoulos	5	0	5
2	(Greece) Christos Arvanitis	3	0	3
3	(Greece) Spyros Ikonomopoulos	1	0	1
Totals		9	0	9

=== Disciplinary record ===
As of 16 June 1985

N	P	Nat.	Name	Alpha Ethniki			Greek Cup			Total			Notes
N	P	Nat.	Name	Yellow card	Second yellow card	Red card	Yellow card	Second yellow card	Red card	Yellow card	Second yellow card	Red card	Notes
Goalkeepers
—	GK	(Greece)	Christos Arvanitis	1						1			
—	GK	(Greece)	Spyros Ikonomopoulos										
—	GK	(Greece)	Theologis Papadopoulos										
Defenders
—	DF	(Greece)	Makis Chatzis	2						2			
—	DF	(Greece)	Stavros Letsas	2						2			
—	DF	(Greece)	Panagiotis Stylianopoulos	3						3			
—	DF	(Greece)	Pavlos Papaioannou	2						2			
—	DF	(Greece)	Takis Karagiozopoulos	5	1					5	1		
—	DF	(Greece)	Stelios Manolas	2						2			
—	DF	(Greece)	Lysandros Georgamlis										
—	DF	(Greece)	Dimos Tsimiliotis										
Midfielders
—	MF	(Greece)	Christos Ardizoglou	1		1				1		1	
—	MF	(Greece)	Dinos Ballis	5						5			
—	MF	(Greece)	Nikos Pias	1						1			
—	MF	(Greece)	Babis Akrivopoulos										
—	MF	(Greece)	Vangelis Vlachos	1						1			
Forwards
—	FW	(Greece)	Thomas Mavros										
—	FW	(Hungary)	Márton Esterházy										
—	FW	(Sweden)	Håkan Sandberg	4						4			
—	FW	(Greece)	Andreas Voitsidis										
—	FW	(Greece)	Giannis Dintsikos	2						2			
—	FW	(Greece)	Michalis Pytharoulis										
Left during Winter Transfer Window
—	GK	(Greece)	Lakis Stergioudas										
—	DF	(Greece)	Vangelis Paraprastanitis										
—	MF	(Czechoslovakia)	František Štambachr										
—	FW	(Greece)	Manolis Kottis										

=== Starting 11 ===
This section presents the most frequently used formation along with the players with the most starts across all competitions.

N.	Formation	Matchday(s)
20	4–4–2	11–30
11	4–3–3	1–10

Nat.	Player	Pos.
(Greece)	Theologis Papadopoulos	GK
(Greece)	Stelios Manolas	RCB
(Greece)	Takis Karagiozopoulos	LCB
(Greece)	Makis Chatzis	RB
(Greece)	Panagiotis Stylianopoulos	LB
(Greece)	Lysandros Georgamlis	DM
(Greece)	Dinos Ballis	CM
(Greece)	Pavlos Papaioannou	RM
(Hungary)	Márton Esterházy	LM
(Sweden)	Håkan Sandberg	RCF
(Greece)	Thomas Mavros (C)	LCF

Last updated: 1985-06-16

== Awards ==
Player	Pos.	Award	Source
(Greece) Thomas Mavros	FW	Alpha Ethniki Top Scorer	
