= 1980 Greek Super Cup =

Olympiacos	Kastoria
4	3
- Date: 29 May 1980
- Venue: Karaiskakis Stadium, Piraeus
- Referee: Dimitris Pantzalis (Piraeus)
- Attendance: 11,563

The 1980 Greek Super Cup was the 1st edition of the Greek Super Cup, an association football match contested by the winners of the previous season's Alpha Ethniki and Greek Cup competitions. The match took place on 29 May 1980 at Karaiskakis Stadium. The contesting teams were the 1979–80 Alpha Ethniki champions, Olympiacos and the 1979–80 Greek Cup winners, Kastoria. Olympiacos won the match 4–3.

The institution was organized by PSAT as an unofficial match, but it was later officially recognized. The match was held just four days after the cup final and five days after the championship play-off between Olympiacos and Aris.

== Venue ==
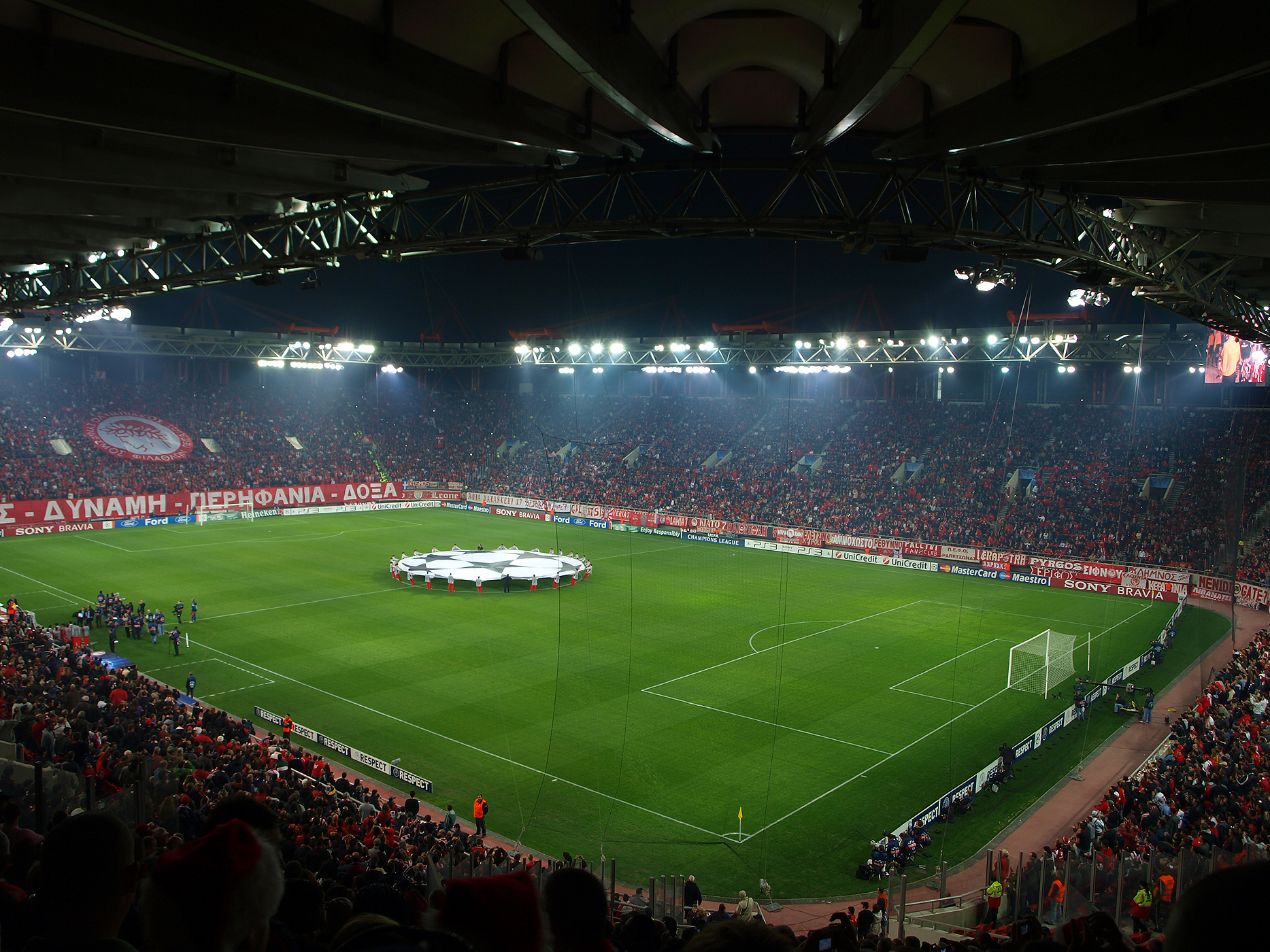
Karaiskakis Stadium.

This was the first Greek Super Cup held at the Karaiskakis Stadium.

Karaiskakis Stadium was built in 1895 and renovated once in 1964. The stadium is used as a venue for Olympiacos and Ethnikos Piraeus and was used for Greece in various occasions. Its current capacity is 42,000 and hosted a European Cup Winners' Cup final in 1971 and the fist leg of the Intercontinental Cup final in 1971.

== Match ==
=== Details ===
29 May 1980
21:15 EEST (UTC+3)

Olympiacos	4–3	Kastoria
Ahlström 5', 19'; Xanthopoulos 73'; Kokolakis 84'	Report	Bakis 70'; Kopanos 76'; Voitsidis 82'

Karaiskakis Stadium, Piraeus
Attendance: 11,563
Referee: Dimitris Pantzalis (Piraeus)

Olympiacos	Kastoria

GK	1	(Greece) Andreas Tsakmakidis
RB	6	(Greece) Petros Xanthopoulos
CB	3	(Cyprus) Stavros Papadopoulos
CB	4	(Greece) Petros Michos
LB	5	(Greece) Nikos Vamvakoulas
DM	2	(Greece) Petros Karavitis (c)
DM	7	(Greece) Vangelis Kousoulakis
AM	8	(Cyprus) Gregory Savva	(substituted off) 60'
RW	9	(Greece) Takis Lemonis	(substituted off) 46'
LW	10	(Sweden) Thomas Ahlström	(substituted off) 46'
CF	11	(Greece) Michalis Kritikopoulos	(substituted off) 46'
Substitutes:
GK		(Greece) Christos Arvanitis
DF		(Greece) Georgios Kokolakis	(substituted on) 46'
DF		(Greece) Lykourgos Athanasopoulos	(substituted on) 60'
FW		(Greece) Georgios Gavasiadis	(substituted on) 46'
FW		(Greece) Christos Kaltsas	(substituted on) 46'
Manager:
(Greece) Thanasis Bebis

GK	1	(Greece) Nikos Sarganis
RB	2	(Greece) Lazaros Alexiadis
CB	3	(Greece) Giannis Siapanidis
CB	6	(Greece) Georgios Paraschos (c)
LB	5	(Greece) Lakis Simeoforidis	(substituted off) 73'
DM	4	(Greece) Antonis Kopanos
CM	8	(Greece) Grigoris Papavasiliou
CM	10	(Greece) Pavlos Siantsis	(substituted off) 46'
LW	7	(Greece) Giannis Dintsikos	(substituted off) 68'
RW	9	(Greece) Andreas Voitsidis
CF	11	(Greece) Dimitris Tsironis	(substituted off) 46'
Substitutes:
GK		(Greece) Thanasis Ermidis
MF		(Greece) Argyris Papavasiliou	(substituted on) 46'
MF		(Greece) Papadopoulos	(substituted on) 73'
FW		(Greece) Kostas Bakis	(substituted on) 46'
FW		(Greece) Georgios Chounouzidis	(substituted on) 68'
Manager:
(Greece) Savvas Vasiliadis

Assistant referees:
Kostas Dimitriadis (Piraeus)
Mouratidis (Piraeus)

Match rules

- 90 minutes
- 30 minutes of extra time if necessary
- Penalty shootout if scores still level
- Five named substitutes
- Maximum of four substitutions
