= Kokolakis =

Kokolakis (Greek: Κοκολάκης) is a Greek surname. Notable people with the surname include:

- Dimitris Kokolakis (born 1949), Greek basketball player
- Georgios Kokolakis (born 1960), Greek footballer and scout
