= Andreas Voitsidis =

Greek footballer

Personal information
- Full name: Andreas Voitsidis
- Date of birth: 28 April 1960 (age 66)
- Place of birth: Pella, Greece
- Position: Forward

Youth career
- Aris Palefytou
- –1979: Anagennisi Chalkidona

Senior career*
Years	Team	Apps	(Gls)
1979–1984	Kastoria	68	(9)
1984–1987	AEK Athens	24	(0)
1987–1989	PAS Giannina		
1989	Eordaikos		

Managerial career
- 1994–1998: Aris Palaifyto
- 2009–2010: Olympiacos Galatadon
- * Club domestic league appearances and goals

Andreas Voitsidis (Greek: Ανδρέας Βοϊτσίδης; born 28 April 1960) is a Greek former professional footballer who played as a forward and a former manager.

== Club career ==
Voitsidis began playing football for the team of his homeland, Aris Palefytou. At the age of 18, he was scouted by Kastoria and in 1979 they eventually signed him. There, he excelled with the great team of the late 70s, with players such as Nikos Sarganis, Georgios Paraschos, and Giannis Dintsikos. At 25 May 1980 they achieved a great surprise as they managed to beat Iraklis by 5–2 and win the Greek Cup. He also played in the 1980 Greek Super Cup, scoring the last goal of his team in the 4–3 defeat against Olympiacos. He stayed at Kastoria despite their relegation in 1983.

On 10 July 1984 Voitsidis was transferred to AEK Athens for a fee of 2.4 million drachmas. There, he was reunited with his former teammate at Kastoria, Dintsikos. At AEK Voitsidis was used as an alternative solution at the team's offense. He mainly helped with his height in tight matches, but he was certainly not the player to replace the team's main striker, Håkan Sandberg. Nevertheless, he stayed at the club for three seasons, occasionally helping the team to get results in difficult matches, but he did not manage to score even once in the championship.

On 15 July 1987 Voitsidis was transferred to PAS Giannina, where he spent two seasons playing in the second division. Afterwards, he moved to Eordaikos, where he ended his career as footballer.

== Managerial career ==
After he retired as a footballer, Voitsidis continued his involvement with football coaching local teams in Pella, such as Olympiacos Galatadon, PAS Megas Alexandros, Aris Palaifyto. The highlight of his managerial career was his presence on the bench of the Edessaikos.

== Honours ==
Kastoria

- Greek Cup: 1979–80
