= Čebín =

- Municipality
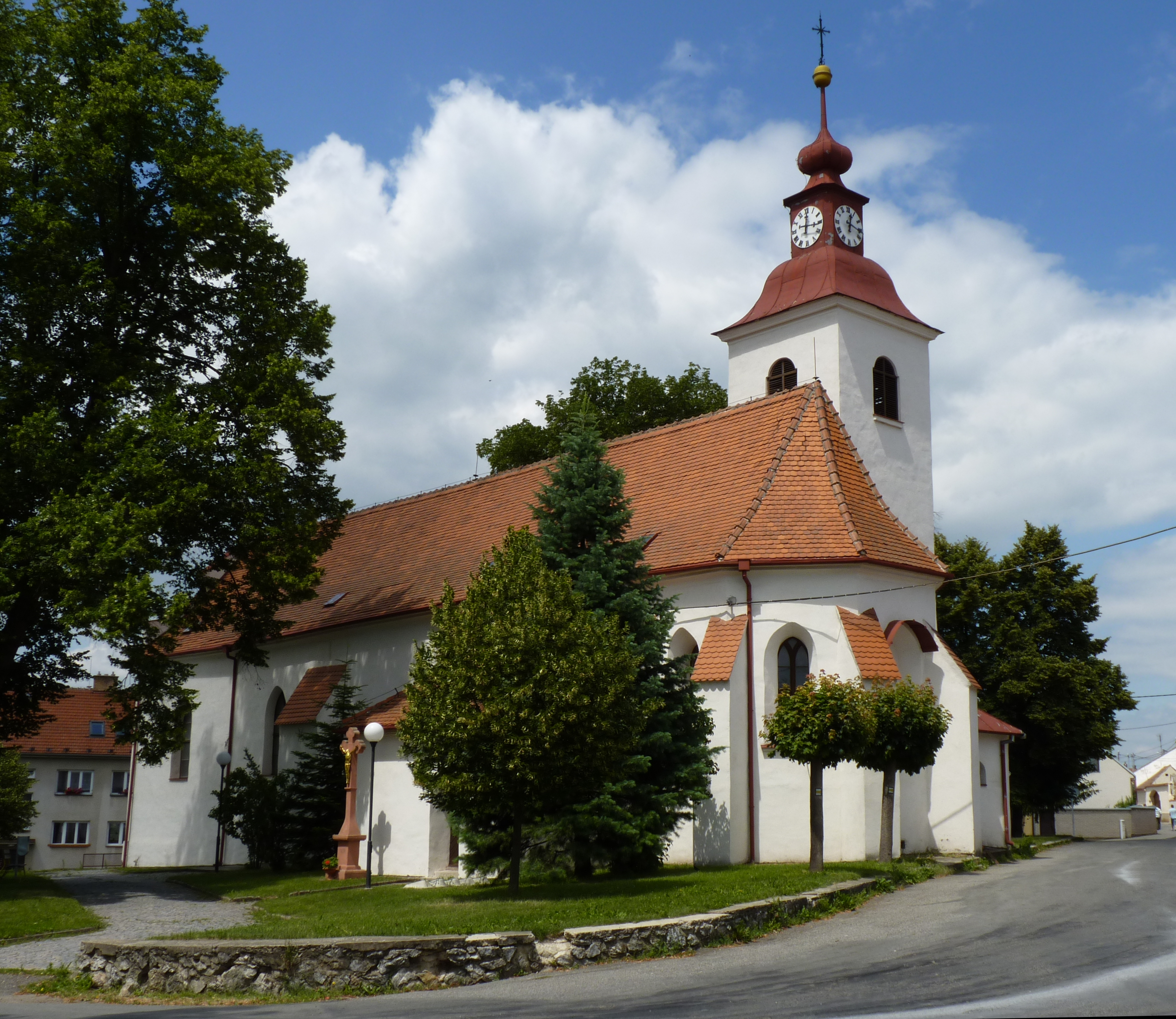
- Church of Saint George

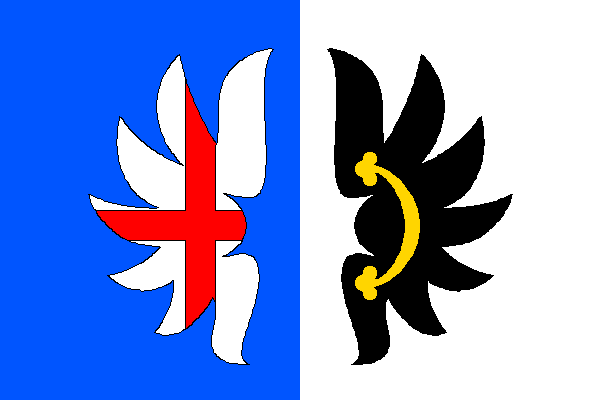
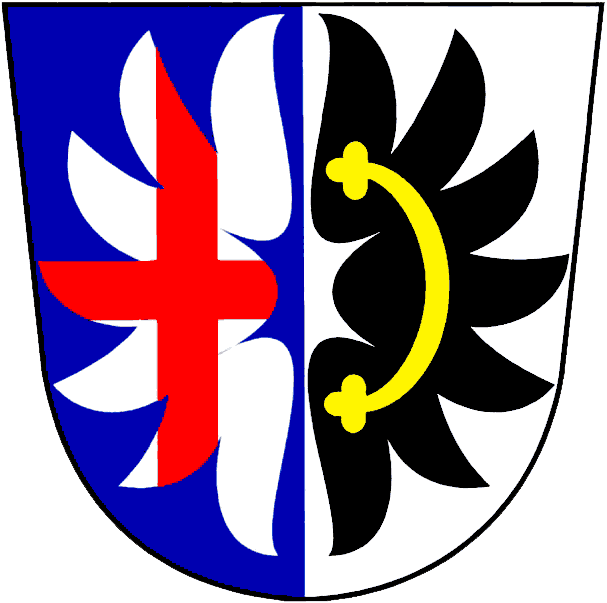
- Flag Coat of arms

- Location in the Czech Republic
- Coordinates: 49°18′48″N 16°28′41″E
- Country: Czech Republic
- Region: South Moravian
- District: Brno-Country
- First mentioned: 1353

Area
  - Total: 7.23 km^{2} (2.79 sq mi)
- Elevation: 280 m (920 ft)

Population (2026-01-01)
  - Total: 1,948
  - Density: 269/km^{2} (698/sq mi)
- Time zone: UTC+1 (CET)
  - Summer (DST): UTC+2 (CEST)
- Postal code: 664 23
- Website: www.obec-cebin.cz

Čebín is a municipality and village in Brno-Country District in the South Moravian Region of the Czech Republic. It has about 1,900 inhabitants.

== Geography ==
Čebín is located about 15 kilometres (9 mi) northwest of Brno. Most of the municipal territory lies in the Boskovice Furrow, but it also extends into the Bobrava Highlands in the east. The highest point is the hill Čebínka at 429 m (1,407 ft) above sea level.

== History ==
The first written mention of Čebín is from 1353. From 1412 until the establishment of an independent municipality in 1848, the village belonged to the Lomnice estate.

== Demographics ==
Historical population

Year	Pop.	±%
1869	637	—
1880	701	+10.0%
1890	768	+9.6%
1900	742	−3.4%
1910	865	+16.6%

Year	Pop.	±%
1921	914	+5.7%
1930	1,123	+22.9%
1950	1,269	+13.0%
1961	1,292	+1.8%
1970	1,485	+14.9%

Year	Pop.	±%
1980	1,564	+5.3%
1991	1,574	+0.6%
2001	1,570	−0.3%
2011	1,670	+6.4%
2021	1,850	+10.8%

Source: Censuses

== Transport ==
Čebín is located on the railway lines Židlochovice–Křižanov via Brno and Tišnov–Hustopeče via Brno.

== Sights ==
The main landmark of Čebín is the Church of Saint George. It was built in the Gothic style in the first half of the 14th century, but it has a Romanesque core. After the 1772 fire, the church was modified and expanded. Further modifications were made in the mid-19th century.

== Notable people ==
- František Štambachr (born 1953), footballer
