= František Štambachr =

Czech footballer

Personal information
- Date of birth: 13 February 1953 (age 73)
- Place of birth: Čebín, Czechoslovakia
- Height: 1.76 m (5 ft 9 in)
- Position: Midfielder

Youth career
- 1961–1968: Sokol Čebín
- 1968–1972: KPS Brno

Senior career*
Years	Team	Apps	(Gls)
1972–1984	Dukla Prague	292	(31)
1984	AEK Athens	9	(0)
1984–1985	Apollon Athens	12	(3)
Total		313	(34)

International career
1977–1983	Czechoslovakia	31	(5)
1980	Czechoslovakia Olympic	4	(0)
Medal record
Representing Czechoslovakia
UEFA European Championship
Winner	1976 Yugoslavia
Summer Olympics
Gold medal – first place	1980 Moscow	Team
- * Club domestic league appearances and goals

František Štambachr or Štambacher (born 13 February 1953 in Čebín), nicknamed "Štambi", is a former Czechoslovak footballer, gold medalist with the Czechoslovak Olympic Football Team at the 1980 Summer Olympics in Moscow. He was considered as an allrounder who could play in almost every position of the midfield (especially left wing and defensive midfield).

== Club career ==
During his youth Štambachr played for Sokol Čebín and KPS Brno. In 1972, he transferred to Dukla Prague (nowadays known as Marila Pribram). For Dukla he reached a total of 292 top league appearances and scored 31 goals. In 1977, 1979 and 1982 he became champion of Czechoslovakia, in 1981 and 1983 national Cup winner.

On 11 June 1984 he moved to Greece and was transferred to AEK Athens for a fee of 14 million drachmas. Despite his good performances with the club, the departure of the manager Václav Halama and the need to open a foreign's slot in the roster resluted in his release midseason. On 14 December Apollon Athens, where he finished his career at the end of the season.

== International career ==
Štambachr played for Czechoslovakia a total of 31 matches, in which he scored 5 goals. He was part of the winning squad of the 1976 European Championship, where he did not compete. He also participated at the 1980 European Championship and the 1982 FIFA World Cup.

He played with the Olympic team in the 1980 Summer Olympics where they won the golden medal.

== Honours ==
Dukla Prague

- Czechoslovak First League: 1976–77, 1978–79, 1981–82
- Czechoslovak Cup: 1980–81

Czechoslovakia

- UEFA European Championship: 1976

Czechoslovakia Olympic

- Summer Olympics: 1980
