= Urban Hammar =

Swedish footballer and manager

Personal information
- Date of birth: 12 August 1961 (age 65)
- Place of birth: Falköping, Sweden
- Height: 1.80 m (5 ft 11 in)
- Position: Midfielder

Senior career*
| Years | Team | Apps | (Gls) |
| 1979–1982 | IF Heimer | | |
| 1983–1986 | Örebro SK | | |
| 1987 | AIK | | |

Managerial career
- 1997–1999: KB Karlskoga
- 2001: Örebro SK (assistant)
- 2007: Örebro SK
- 2009–2012: Gefle IF (assistant)
- * Club domestic league appearances and goals

Urban Hammar (born 12 August 1961) is a Swedish retired football midfielder and later manager.
