= Georgios Kokolakis =

Greek footballer

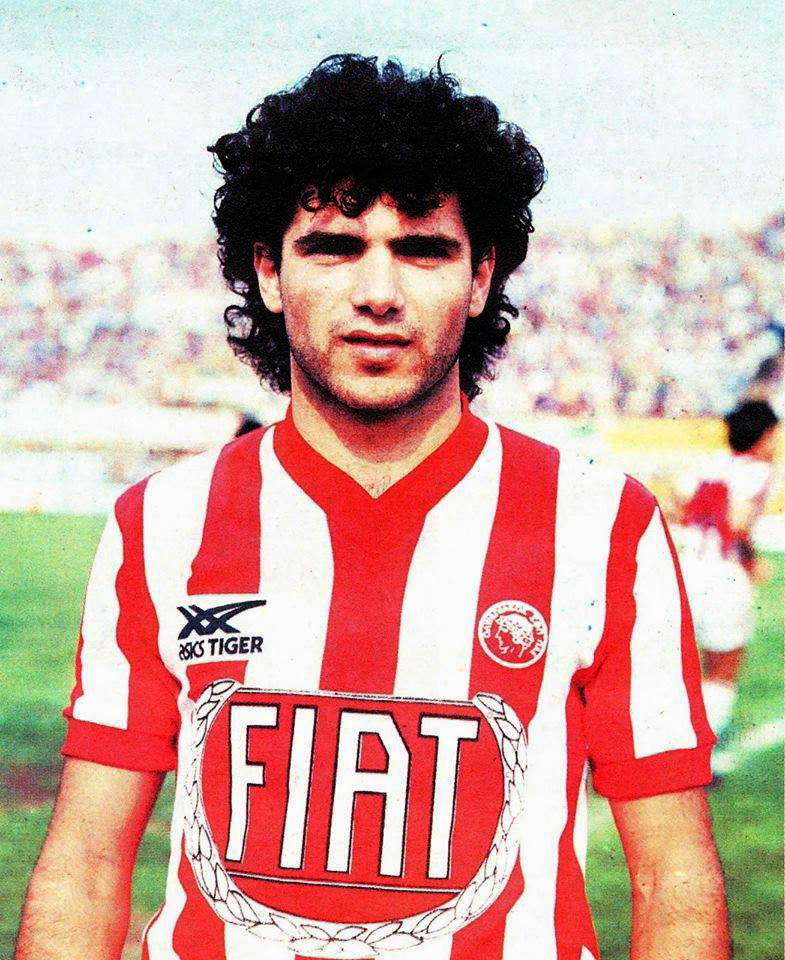
- Kokolakis in action for Olympiacos (1983)

Personal information
- Full name: Georgios Kokolakis
- Date of birth: 3 September 1960 (age 66)
- Place of birth: Rethymno, Crete, Greece
- Height: 1.72 m (5 ft 7 1/2 in)
- Position: Full back

Team information
- Current team: Olympiacos (scout)

Senior career*
Years	Team	Apps	(Gls)
1979–1987	Olympiacos	126	(8)
1987–1988	OFI	7	(1)
- * Club domestic league appearances and goals

Georgios Kokolakis (Greek: Γεώργιος Κοκολάκης, born 3 September 1960) is a former Greek footballer who currently works for Greek club Olympiacos, as a Scout.

== Honours ==
Olympiacos

- Alpha Ethniki: 1979–80, 1980–81, 1981–82, 1982–83, 1986–87
- Greek Cup: 1980–81
- Greek Super Cup: 1980, 1987
