= Babis Akrivopoulos =

Greek footballer

Personal information
- Full name: Charalampos Akrivopoulos
- Date of birth: 4 September 1961 (age 65)
- Place of birth: Rachia, Veria, Greece
- Height: 1.86 m (6 ft 1 in)
- Positions: Attacking midfielder; forward

Youth career
- 1976–1980: AE Nea Sampsounta

Senior career*
Years	Team	Apps	(Gls)
1980–1983	Veria		
1983–1986	AEK Athens	24	(1)
1986–1988	Veria		
1988–1996	Pontioi Veria		
- * Club domestic league appearances and goals

Babis Akrivopoulos (Greek: Μπάμπης Ακριβόπουλος; born 4 September 1961) is a Greek former professional footballer who played as attacking midfielder.

== Club career ==
Akrivopoulos distinguished himself playing football in Veria. With impressive physical qualities, height, strength and scoring appeal, he was often used as a striker. He was also accompanied by a reputation that in his village he accidentally killed a donkey by hitting him shot by his left foot. On 29 May 1983 in a match against Florina, he scored 5 of the 7 goals in his team's 7–1 victory. His fame from the matches of Veria in the second division, but also the continuation of his studies at the Gymnastics Academy after graduating from the Pedagogical Academy, brought attracted the interest of AEK Athens. Akrivopoulos was positive in a potential move to AEK, since he was a supporter of the club. On 15 July 1983 his transfer was complete over the phone by the president of AEK Athens himself, Lefteris Panagidis with the club spendig 8.4 million drachmas for his acquisition.

He made his debut at AEK on 4 September 1983 in a 2–0 home win over PAS Giannina. He scored his first goal on 9 October 1983 in a 4–1 home win against Panionios. A few months later, on 27 November 1983, in the home match against Iraklis Akrivopoulos, after a murderous tackle by Karaiskos who was known for his tough play, went to surgery on the cruciates. He returned to the playing fields after about a year. His return to the team would last a few months until his second injury in the 2–2 draw with AEL on 19 October 1985, which again sent him into surgery for a cruciate ligament operation on the other leg.

In December 1986 he was released from AEK, and he returned to Veria. In 1988 he moved to Pontioi Veria, where played for 7 years the in smaller divisions until 1996 when he retired.

== After football ==
Akrivopoulos has been working as a teacher in primary schools in the region of Veria.
