= Márton Esterházy =

Hungarian footballer (born 1956)

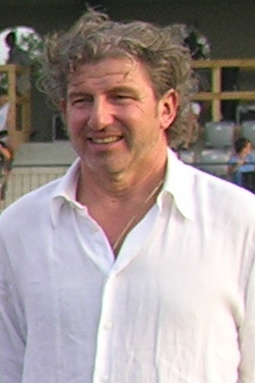

Personal information
- Date of birth: 9 April 1956 (age 70)
- Place of birth: Budapest, Hungary
- Height: 1.82 m (6 ft 0 in)
- Position: Forward

Senior career*
Years	Team	Apps	(Gls)
1975–1976	III. Kerületi TVE		
1976–1977	Budafoki LC		
1977–1979	Ferencváros	21	(2)
1979–1984	Honvéd	153	(62)
1984–1986	AEK Athens	54	(16)
1986–1988	Panathinaikos	11	(1)
1988–1989	Casino Salzburg		
1989–1991	CS Chênois	30	(15)
1991–1993	FC Bulle		
1993–1994	SC Weissenbach		
Total		269	(96)

International career
1980–1988	Hungary	29	(11)
- * Club domestic league appearances and goals

Márton Esterházy (born 9 April 1956) is a Hungarian former professional footballer who played as a forward. He is a descendant of the Esterházy aristocratic family. After retiring, like his famous writer brother Péter Esterházy, he became a published author himself as well. He is also the head of the Hungarian Futsal Committee, and in February 2007 became a UEFA controller.

== Club career ==
Esterházy played for Budafoki LC, Ferencváros and in 1979 he moved to Honvéd, where he was established as one of their key players.

On 12 December 1984 he was transferred to the Greek side, AEK Athens for a fee of 22.95 million drachmas. At AEK it did not take long for him to impress, alongside Thomas Mavros and Hokan Sandberg they composed a "magical" triplet in the mid-80s. One of highlights of his career was against Real Madrid on 18 September 1985 for the UEFA Cup. After the shot of Pavlos Papaioannou he went in the course of the ball, jumping over the it and confusing José Manuel Ochotorena, as a result of which it ended up in his net and AEK won the match. In 1986 as his performance declined and AEK did not proceed in renewing his contract.

On 3 December Esterházy joined city rivals, Panathinaikos. He played for the greens for 1.5 years, but without much success. He then moved to Austria to play for Casino Salzburg. In 1989 he traveled to Switzerland for CS Chênois and then for FC Bulle. He ended his career in 1994 at Weissenbach.

== International career ==
He scored 11 goals for the Hungary national team, and was a participant at the 1986 FIFA World Cup in Mexico, where Hungary failed to progress from the group stage. Esterházy scored the first goal in the 2–0 win against Canada.

== Honours ==
Honvéd

- Nemzeti Bajnokság I: 1983–84, 1984–85
- Magyar Kupa: 1984–85
