= Nikos Pias =

Greek footballer and manager

Personal information
- Full name: Nikolaos Pias
- Date of birth: 7 April 1960 (age 66)
- Place of birth: Nafpaktos, Greece
- Height: 1.84 m (6 ft 0 in)
- Position: Midfielder

Youth career
- –1978: Apollon Kalythies

Senior career*
Years	Team	Apps	(Gls)
1978–1984	Rodos		
1984–1988	AEK Athens	69	(7)
1988–1990	Olympiacos Volos	52	(3)
1990–1992	Panachaiki	51	(7)
1992	Panargiakos		

Managerial career
- 1996–1997: Korinthos
- 1998–1999: Doxa Vyronas
- 2000–2001: Nafpaktiakos Asteras
- * Club domestic league appearances and goals

Nikos Pias (Greek: Νίκος Πιάς; born 7 April 1960) is a Greek former professional footballer who played as a midfielder and a manager.

== Career ==
Pias started as an amateur at Apollon Kalythies in Rhodes and in 1978 he moved to Rodos, where he won 2 second division championships. His talent attracted the interest of the first division clubs. On 29 June 1984 Pias was transferred to AEK Athens for a fee of 1.35 million drachmas. In his first season at AEK he achieved a scoring streak of 3 goals in 4 consecutive matches, against OFI, Panathinaikos at home and Apollon Athens away.

On 24 June 1988 he was transferred to Olympiacos Volos for a fee of 6.5 million dracmas. In 1990 he moved to Panachaiki, where he played for 2 seasons. Afterwards he joined Panargiakos, where his career ended abruptly at in November 1992 after a serious injury. During he spell at the club he competed against his former club, AEK Athens in August 1992 for the Cup making and made an assist.

== Honours ==
Rodos

- Beta Ethniki: 1977–78, 1980–81
