= Christos Arvanitis =

Greek footballer (born 1953)

Personal information
- Full name: Christos Arvanitis
- Date of birth: 23 January 1953 (age 73)
- Place of birth: Edessa, Greece
- Height: 1.78 m (5 ft 10 in)
- Position: Goalkeeper

Youth career
- –1966: Afovos
- 1966–1971: Ethnikos Piraeus

Senior career*
Years	Team	Apps	(Gls)
1971–1978	Ethnikos Piraeus	172	(0)
1978–1982	Olympiacos	55	(0)
1982–1985	AEK Athens	76	(0)
1985–1987	Olympiacos	20	(0)
1987–1989	Levadiakos	41	(0)
Total		364	(0)

International career
1978	Greece	1	(0)
1983	Greece Olympic	2	(0)

Managerial career
- 1990–1991: AE Kos
- * Club domestic league appearances and goals

Christos Arvanitis (Greek: Χρήστος Αρβανίτης; born 23 January 1953) is a Greek former professional footballer who played as a goalkeeper.

== Club career ==
Arvanitis started his football career playing for Afovos and in July 1966 he moved to the youth departments of Ethnikos Piraeus. In 1971 he was promoted to the senior team, where he displayed good performances. His performances attracted the interest of Olympiacos and in 1978, Arvanitis was transferred to the club.

In the "red and whites" after spending a year as a substitute, he replaced Panagiotis Kelesidis under the goalpost and with his performances helped Olympiacos to win the championship in 1980. Later, however, he was displaced from the eleven by the prominent Nikos Sarganis, as a result of which he looked for a new club to continue his career. In his 4-year spell he won three convective championships, from 1980 to 1982 and one Cup including a domestic double in 1981.

On 25 July 1982, the president of AEK Athens, Michalis Arkadis brought him to the club, alongside his teammate Takis Nikoloudis for a total fee of 12 million drachmas. A goalkeeper with great reflexes and an amazing jump, but also unstable at times, he was nevertheless a goalkeeper with a positive presence in the league. The manager, Zlatko Čajkovski gave him immediately a place in the starting eleven. He had a major contribution in the conquest of the Cup in 1983, keeping a clean sheet in the final against PAOK. The acquisition of Theologis Papadopoulos in the summer of 1985 resulted in his sideline from the starting eleven.

On 16 December 1985, he returned to Olympiacos for a fee of 6 million drachmas. He played at the club until 1987, where he won yet another league. Afterwards he signed for Levadiakos where he ended his career in 1989.

== International career ==
Arvanitis competed once with Greece, on 11 January 1978 in an away friendly win against Cyprus by 0–2. he was an international player both with Greece U21 and with the Olympic team, playing twice in 1983.

== After football ==
After the end of his career Arvanitis was a goalkeeping coach in all the teams he had played for. At Olympiacos, Levadiakos, Ethnikos, but also in AEK for some months of the 2012–13 season. Since October 2015, he worked at the football academy of the amateur AEK. In 2017 he worked as the technical director of the Nestoras FC, academy of the legendary Kostas Nestoridis.

== Honours ==
Olympiacos

- Alpha Ethniki: 1979–80, 1980–81, 1981–82, 1986–87
- Greek Cup: 1980–81
- Greek Super Cup: 1980

AEK Athens

- Greek Cup: 1982–83
