= Håkan Sandberg (footballer) =

Swedish footballer (born 1958)

Personal information
- Full name: Sven Håkan Sandberg
- Date of birth: 27 July 1958 (age 68)
- Place of birth: Ludvika, Sweden
- Height: 1.88 m (6 ft 2 in)
- Position: Forward

Youth career
- Ludvika FF

Senior career*
Years	Team	Apps	(Gls)
1976–1981	Örebro SK	92	(31)
1981–1984	IFK Göteborg	71	(34)
1984–1987	AEK Athens	80	(30)
1987–1988	Olympiacos	2	(0)
1988–1989	GIF Sundsvall	41	(15)

International career
1975–1976	Sweden U19	10	(2)
1978–1980	Sweden U21	10	(2)
1982–1985	Sweden	13	(3)
- * Club domestic league appearances and goals

Håkan Sandberg (born 27 June 1958) is a Swedish former professional footballer who played as a forward in Sweden and Greece. He made 13 appearances for the Sweden national team scoring three goals.

== Club career ==
Sandberg started off his footballing career with Ludvika FF, before signing with the Allsvenskan club Örebro SK in 1976. He signed with IFK Göteborg in 1981, and helped the team with the 1981–82 UEFA Cup as well as the 1982, 1983, and 1984 Swedish Championships. In 1984, he left for Greece where he spent three seasons with

On 5 July 1984, Sandberg moved to Greece and was transferred to AEK Athens for a fee of 8 million drachmas. He immediately stood out for his distinctive appearance and for his playing style. Alongside Thomas Mavros and Márton Esterházy, created an effective offensive triplet in the team. Οn 2 December 1984 in a home match against Apollon Athens he made an assist to Mavros, where the players exchanged headers before the latter scored. During his spell at AEK he scored two hat-tricks against Panachaiki at home and Ethnikos Piraeus away from home. He also scored a brace in the away defeat against Panathinaikos with 3–2. He was the scorer for his club in the 1–1 at home against Olympiacos.

On 2 July 1987, he was released from AEK and signed for Olympiacos. His participation and contribution to the "red and whites" was near to nothing, since he was suffering from injuries. He returned to Sweden in 1988 to finish up his career with GIF Sundsvall.

== International career ==
Sandberg won a total of 20 youth caps for the Sweden U19 and U21 teams, scoring 4 goals. He made his full international debut for Sweden on 13 November 1982 in a UEFA Euro 1984 qualifier against Cyprus which Sweden won 1–0. He scored his first international goal for Sweden on 29 May 1983 in a UEFA 1984 qualifier against Italy which Sweden Sweden won 2–0. His last international appearance came on 17 November 1985 in a 1986 FIFA World Cup qualifier against Malta. Sandberg won a total of 13 caps for Sweden and scored three goals, but never appeared in a major international tournament.

== Career statistics ==
Appearances and goals by national team and year
National team	Year	Apps	Goals
Sweden	1982	1	0
Sweden	1983	6	1
Sweden	1984	4	2
Sweden	1985	2	0
Total		13	3

Scores and results list Sweden's goal tally first, score column indicates score after each Sandberg goal.

List of international goals scored by Håkan Sandberg
No.	Date	Venue	Opponent	Score	Result	Competition	Ref.
1	29 May 1983	Ullevi, Gothenburg, Sweden	Italy	1–0	2–0	UEFA Euro 1984 qualifier	
2	23 February 1984	Tipshallen Elmia, Jönköping, Sweden	United States	3–0	4–0	Friendly	
3	23 February 1984	Tipshallen Elmia, Jönköping, Sweden	United States	4–0	4–0	Friendly	

== Honours ==
IFK Göteborg

- UEFA Cup: 1981–82
- Allsvenskan: 1982, 1983, 1984
