= Giannis Dintsikos =

Greek footballer

Personal information
- Full name: Ioannis Dintsikos
- Date of birth: 25 June 1960 (age 66)
- Place of birth: Rodiani, Kozani, Greece
- Height: 1.84 m (6 ft 0 in)
- Position: Forward

Youth career
- 1969–1974: Doxa Rodiani
- 1974–1977: Kastoria

Senior career*
Years	Team	Apps	(Gls)
1977–1981	Kastoria	68	(21)
1981–1988	AEK Athens	150	(26)
1988–1989	Kastoria		
1989–1992	Asteras Amaliadas		
Total		218	(47)

International career
1983	Greece Olympic	1	(1)
1984	Greece	3	(0)
- * Club domestic league appearances and goals

Giannis Dintsikos (Greek: Γιάννης Δίντσικος; born 25 June 1960) is a Greek former professional footballer who played as a forward.

== Club career ==
Dintsikos started playing football in 1969 at Doxa Rodiani of his hometown Kozani. Five years later he joined the academies of Kastoria and in 1977 he was promoted to the men's team. He was a member of the team that won the Greek Cup in 1980, while he also scored in the final at the 5–2 against Iraklis.

On 6 July 1981, Dintsikos was transferred to AEK Athens, for a fee of 20 million drachmas. On 21 October 1984 he scored a hat-trick in the imposing 7–2 at home over Pierikos. He played for 8 seasons at the club winning another Greek Cup in 1983, as well as the championship in 1989. Nevertheless, his health issues and problematic off-field life had a negative impact throughout his career and led in his playing time become significantly reduced. The above situation led in his eventual release from the club on 1 November 1988.

On 18 November, Dintsikos returned to Kastoria, who were playing in the second division. After the end of the season he moved to Asteras Amaliadas at the local championships of Elis and finished his career in 1992.

== International career ==
Dintsikos made three appearances for Greece during 1984. He made his debut on 12 September 1984, in an away friendly against East Germany, where he started the match under the guidance of Miltos Papapostolou.

He was also a member of the Olympic team that participated in the pre-Olympic tournament to qualify for the 1984 Summer Olympics in Los Angeles, where he scored in his only appearance, in the away match against Hungary.

== Honours ==
Kastoria

- Greek Cup: 1979–80

AEK Athens

- Alpha Ethniki: 1988–89
- Greek Cup: 1982–83
