= Greek football clubs in European competitions =

Points by season (UEFA coefficient)
Season	Points
2015–16	5.400
2016–17	5.800
2017–18	5.200
2018–19	5.100
2019–20	4.900
2020–21	5.100
2021–22	8.000
2022–23	2.125
2023–24	11.400
2024–25	12.687
2025–26	14.200
2026–27	7.200

A total of 20 Greek clubs have participated in European competitions so far. Olympiacos made the first appearance when they took part in the 1959–60 European Cup and are the club with the most overall apps/matches. They are also the only Greek team to have won a European trophy and the first team in Europe to win both senior and youth European titles in the same season, after winning the 2023–24 UEFA Europa Conference League and the 2023–24 UEFA Youth League. Other important landmarks of Greek football in European competitions are the participation of Panathinaikos in the 1971 European Cup final and in the semi-finals of the 1985 and 1996 editions. The best UEFA Cup campaign was AEK Athens run to the semi-finals in 1977. Greek clubs have reached at least the quarter-finals of a European competition on 20 occasions in total.

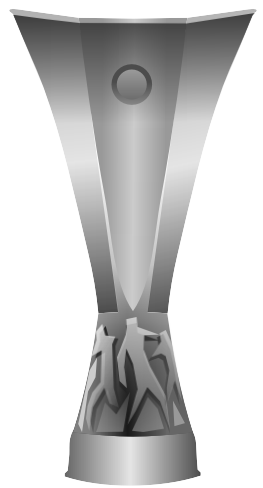
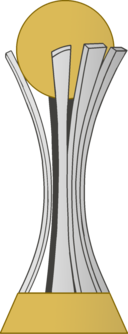
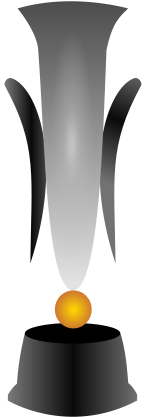
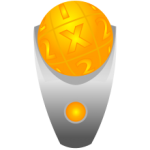
Club											Total
Olympiacos	-	-	1	-	-	-	-	-	-	1	2
June 1, 2026.

== Appearances in UEFA competitions ==
Appearances as of 5 November 2026
Club	UEFA Champions League					UEFA Europa League (Inter-Cities Fairs Cup included)					UEFA Cup Winners' Cup					UEFA Conference League				
Club	App	M	W	D	L	App	M	W	D	L	App	M	W	D	L	App	M	W	D	L
Olympiacos	37^{a}	198	69	40	89	29	142	61	29	52	9^{b}	33^{d}	14	6	13	1	9	7	0	2
Panathinaikos	30	165	51	47	67	26	134	52	30	52	7	22	9	3	10	3	23	12	5	6
AEK Athens	18	84	21	24	39	28	144	47	33	64	6	22	10	3	9	3	22	13	4	5
PAOK	10	32	8	10	14	34	184	70	49	65	6	18	8	5	5	4	36	18	8	10
AEL	1	2	1	0	1	3	10	2	1	7	2	8	3	3	2	0	0	0	0	0
Aris	0	0	0	0	0	18	65	24	17	24	1	2	0	1	1	4	12	6	2	4
Panionios	0	0	0	0	0	7	28	10	1	17	2	10	6	0	4	0	0	0	0	0
OFI	0	0	0	0	0	7	25	11	4	10	1	4	2	0	2	0	0	0	0	0
Iraklis	0	0	0	0	0	8	18	6	2	10	1	2	0	1	1	0	0	0	0	0
Asteras Tripoli	0	0	0	0	0	5	26	6	11	14	0	0	0	0	0	0	0	0	0	0
Atromitos	0	0	0	0	0	7	18	6	3	9	0	0	0	0	0	0	0	0	0	0
Xanthi	0	0	0	0	0	4	10	1	2	7	0	0	0	0	0	0	0	0	0	0
Egaleo	0	0	0	0	0	1	6	1	2	3	0	0	0	0	0	0	0	0	0	0
Panachaiki	0	0	0	0	0	1	4	2	1	1	0	0	0	0	0	0	0	0	0	0
Olympiacos Volos^{c}	0	0	0	0	0	1	4	3	1	0	0	0	0	0	0	0	0	0	0	0
PAS Giannina	0	0	0	0	0	1	4	1	0	3	0	0	0	0	0	0	0	0	0	0
Apollon Smyrnis	0	0	0	0	0	1	2	1	0	1	0	0	0	0	0	0	0	0	0	0
Kastoria	0	0	0	0	0	0	0	0	0	0	1	2	0	1	1	0	0	0	0	0
Athinaikos	0	0	0	0	0	0	0	0	0	0	1	2	0	1	1	0	0	0	0	0
Ionikos	0	0	0	0	0	1	2	0	0	2	0	0	0	0	0	0	0	0	0	0

App = Appearances; M = Matches; W = Wins; D = Draws; L = Losses; GF = Goals for; GA = Goals against; GD = Goal difference; T = Trophies

Total appearances & titles as of 5 November 2026
Club	Total							Titles
Club	M	W	D	L	GF	GA	GD	T
Olympiacos	382	151	75	156	496	537	-41	1
Panathinaikos	344	124	85	135	428	457	-29	0
AEK Athens	272	91	64	117	355	403	-48	0
PAOK	270	104	70	94	386	344	+42	0
AEL	20	6	4	10	18	23	-5	0
Aris	79	30	20	29	101	125	-24	0
Panionios	38	16	1	21	43	60	-17	0
OFI	27	11	4	12	35	35	0	0
Iraklis	20	6	3	11	17	40	-23	0
Asteras Tripoli	26	6	11	14	30	41	-11	0
Atromitos	18	6	3	9	21	26	-5	0
Xanthi	10	1	2	7	8	20	-12	0
Egaleo	6	1	2	3	4	12	-8	0
Panachaiki	4	2	1	1	4	9	-5	0
Olympiacos Volos^{c}	4	3	1	0	8	1	+7	0
PAS Giannina	4	1	0	3	5	6	-1	0
Apollon Smyrnis	2	1	0	1	2	3	-1	0
Kastoria	2	0	1	1	0	2	-2	0
Athinaikos	2	0	1	1	0	2	-2	0
Ionikos	2	0	0	2	1	4	-3	0

App = Appearances; M = Matches; W = Wins; D = Draws; L = Losses; GF = Goals for; GA = Goals against; GD = Goal difference; T = Trophies (The Inter-Cities Fairs Cup not included)

== All-time contribution of points for the UEFA country ranking ==
As of 24 July 2024

Rank	Club	Points
25	Olympiacos	82.250
42	Panathinaikos	63.900
66	PAOK	45.833
70	AEK Athens	44.742
186	Aris	14.633
312	Panionios	6.533
359	OFI	5.267
388	AEL	4.683
472	Iraklis	3.167
499	Asteras Tripoli	2.900
664	Atromitos	1.500
706	Panachaiki	1.250
835	Olympiacos Volos	700
853	Egaleo	667
879	Xanthi	533
903	Apollon Smyrnis	500
1020	Athinaikos	250
1021	Kastoria	250
1053	PAS Giannina	200
1179	Ionikos	0

Source: swissfootballdata.com

== Current UEFA coefficient rankings ==
=== Country rankings ===
As of 5 November 2026

Rank	Competition	Points
1	(England) Premier League	107.685
2	(Italy) Serie A	91.732
3	(Spain) La Liga	86.493
4	(Germany) Bundesliga	84.973
5	(France) Ligue 1	72.296
6	(Portugal) Primeira Liga	69.150
7	(Belgium) Belgian Pro League	64.050
8	(Netherlands) Eredivisie	56.395
9	(Turkey) Süper Lig	53.075
10	Super League Greece	47.612
11	(Czech Republic) Czech First League	46.325
12	(Poland) Ekstraklasa	45.725
13	(Norway) Eliteserien	41.012
14	(Denmark) Danish Superliga	40.806
15	(Cyprus) Cypriot First Division	35.443
16	(Switzerland) Swiss Super League	32.200

=== Club rankings ===
As of 5 November 2026

Rank	Club	Points
28	Olympiacos	61.250
59	PAOK	37.750
63	Panathinaikos	35.250
70	AEK Athens	30.500
177	Aris	9.522
177	OFI	9.322

== Best campaigns ==
=== European Cup / UEFA Champions League ===
Club	Champions	Finalist	Semi-finalist	Quarter-finalist
Panathinaikos	–	1971	1985, 1996	1992, 2002
Olympiacos	–	–	–	1999
AEK Athens	–	–	–	1969

=== UEFA Cup / UEFA Europa League ===
Club	Champions	Finalist	Semi-finalist	Quarter-finalist
AEK Athens	–	–	1977	–
Panathinaikos	–	–	–	1988, 2003

=== UEFA Conference League ===
Club	Champions	Finalist	Semi-finalist	Quarter-finalist
Olympiacos	2024	–	–	–
PAOK	–	–	–	2022, 2024
AEK Athens	–	–	–	2026

=== European Cup Winners' Cup / UEFA Cup Winners' Cup ===
Club	Champions	Finalist	Semi-finalist	Quarter-finalist
AEK Athens	–	–	–	1997, 1998
PAOK	–	–	–	1974
AEL	–	–	–	1985
Olympiacos	–	–	–	1993
Panionios	–	–	–	1999

== European Cup / UEFA Champions League ==
Season	Club	Round	Opponent	Home	Away
European Cup
1958–59^{1}	Olympiacos	Preliminary Round	(Turkey) Beşiktaş		
1959–60	Olympiacos	Preliminary Round	(Italy) Milan	2–2	1–3
1960–61	Panathinaikos	1st Round	(Czechoslovakia) Hradec Králové	0–0	0–1
1961–62	Panathinaikos	Preliminary Round	(Italy) Juventus	1–1	1–2
1962–63	Panathinaikos	Preliminary Round	(Poland) Polonia Bytom	1–4	1–2
1963–64	AEK Athens	Preliminary Round	(France) Monaco	1–1	2–7
1964–65	Panathinaikos	Preliminary Round	(Northern Ireland) Glentoran	3–2	2–2
1964–65	Panathinaikos	1st Round	(West Germany) Köln	1–1	1–2
1965–66	Panathinaikos	Preliminary Round	(Malta) Sliema Wanderers	4–1	0–1
1965–66	Panathinaikos	1st Round	(Hungary) Ferencváros	1–3	0–0
1966–67	Olympiacos	1st Round	(Bulgaria) CSKA Cherveno Zname	1–0	1–3
1967–68	Olympiacos	1st Round	(Italy) Juventus	0–0	0–2
1968–69	AEK Athens	1st Round	(Luxembourg) Jeunesse Esch	3–0	2–3
1968–69	AEK Athens	2nd Round	(Denmark) AB	0–0	2–0
1968–69	AEK Athens	Quarter-finals	(Czechoslovakia) Spartak Trnava	1–1	1–2
1969–70	Panathinaikos	1st Round	(East Germany) Vorwärts Berlin	1–1	0–2
1970–71	Panathinaikos	1st Round	(Luxembourg) Jeunesse Esch	5–0	2–1
1970–71	Panathinaikos	2nd Round	(Czechoslovakia) Slovan Bratislava	3–0	1–2
1970–71	Panathinaikos	Quarter-finals	(England) Everton	0–0 (a)	1–1
1970–71	Panathinaikos	Semi-finals	(Socialist Federal Republic of Yugoslavia) Red Star Belgrade	3–0 (a)	1–4
1970–71	Panathinaikos	Final	(Netherlands) Ajax	0–2^{2}	
1971–72	AEK Athens	1st Round	(Italy) Inter Milan	3–2	1–4
1972–73	Panathinaikos	1st Round	(Bulgaria) CSKA Sofia	0–2^{3}	1–2
1973–74	Olympiacos	1st Round	(Portugal) Benfica	0–1	0–1
1974–75	Olympiacos	1st Round	(Scotland) Celtic	2–0	1–1
1974–75	Olympiacos	2nd Round	(Belgium) Anderlecht	3–0	1–5
1975–76	Olympiacos	1st Round	(Soviet Union) Dynamo Kyiv	2–2	0–1
1976–77	PAOK	1st Round	(Cyprus) Omonia Nicosia	1–1	2–0
1976–77	PAOK	2nd Round	(Soviet Union) Dynamo Kyiv	0–2	0–4
1977–78	Panathinaikos	1st Round	(Malta) Floriana	4–0	1–1
1977–78	Panathinaikos	2nd Round	(Belgium) Club Brugge	1–0	0–2
1978–79	AEK Athens	1st Round	(Portugal) Porto	6–1	1–4
1978–79	AEK Athens	2nd Round	(England) Nottingham Forest	1–2	1–5
1979–80	AEK Athens	1st Round	(Romania) Argeș Pitești	2–0	0–3
1980–81	Olympiacos	1st Round	(West Germany) Bayern Munich	2–4	0–3
1981–82	Olympiacos	1st Round	(Romania) Universitatea Craiova	2–0	0–3
1982–83	Olympiacos	1st Round	(Sweden) Öster	2–0	0–1
1982–83	Olympiacos	2nd Round	(West Germany) Hamburger SV	0–4	0–1
1983–84	Olympiacos	1st Round	(Netherlands) Ajax	2–0 (a.e.t.)	0–0
1983–84	Olympiacos	2nd Round	(Portugal) Benfica	1–0	0–3
1984–85	Panathinaikos	1st Round	(Netherlands) Feyenoord	2–1	0–0
1984–85	Panathinaikos	2nd Round	(Northern Ireland) Linfield	2–1	3–3
1984–85	Panathinaikos	Quarter-finals	(Sweden) IFK Göteborg	2–2	1–0
1984–85	Panathinaikos	Semi-finals	(England) Liverpool	0–1	0–4
1985–86	PAOK	1st Round	(Italy) Hellas Verona	1–2	1–3
1986–87	Panathinaikos	1st Round	(Socialist Federal Republic of Yugoslavia) Red Star Belgrade	2–1	0–3
1987–88	Olympiacos	1st Round	(Poland) Górnik Zabrze	1–1	1–2
1988–89	AEL	1st Round	(Switzerland) Neuchâtel Xamax	2–1	1–2 (0–3 p)
1989–90	AEK Athens	1st Round	(East Germany) Dynamo Dresden	5–3	0–1
1989–90	AEK Athens	2nd Round	(France) Marseille	1–1	0–2
1990–91	Panathinaikos	1st Round	(Poland) Lech Poznań	1–2	0–3
1991–92	Panathinaikos	1st Round	(Iceland) Fram Reykjavik	0–0 (a)	2–2
1991–92	Panathinaikos	2nd Round	(Sweden) IFK Göteborg	2–0	2–2
1991–92	Panathinaikos	Group Stage (Group A)	(Socialist Federal Republic of Yugoslavia) Red Star Belgrade	0–2	0–1
1991–92	Panathinaikos	Group Stage (Group A)	(Belgium) Anderlecht	0–0	0–0
1991–92	Panathinaikos	Group Stage (Group A)	(Italy) Sampdoria	0–0	1–1
UEFA Champions League
1992–93	AEK Athens	1st Round	(Cyprus) APOEL	1–1	2–2 (a)
1992–93	AEK Athens	2nd Round	(Netherlands) PSV Eindhoven	1–0	0–3
1993–94	AEK Athens	1st Round	(France) Monaco	1–1	0–1
1994–95	AEK Athens	Qualifying Round	(Scotland) Rangers	2–0	1–0
1994–95	AEK Athens	Group Stage (Group D)	(Italy) Milan	0–0	1–2
1994–95	AEK Athens	Group Stage (Group D)	(Netherlands) Ajax	1–2	0–2
1994–95	AEK Athens	Group Stage (Group D)	(Austria) Casino Salzburg	1–3	0–0
1995–96	Panathinaikos	Qualifying Round	(Croatia) Hajduk Split	0–0	1–1 (a)
1995–96	Panathinaikos	Group Stage (Group A)	(Portugal) Porto	0–0	1–0
1995–96	Panathinaikos	Group Stage (Group A)	(France) Nantes	3–1	0–0
1995–96	Panathinaikos	Group Stage (Group A)	(Denmark) Aalborg BK	2–0	1–2^{4}
1995–96	Panathinaikos	Quarter-finals	(Poland) Legia Warsaw	3–0	0–0
1995–96	Panathinaikos	Semi-finals	(Netherlands) Ajax	0–3	1–0
1996–97	Panathinaikos	Qualifying Round	(Norway) Rosenborg	1–0	0–3 (a.e.t.)
1997–98	Olympiacos	2nd Qualifying Round	(Belarus) MPKC Mozyr	5–0	2–2
1997–98	Olympiacos	Group Stage (Group D)	(Spain) Real Madrid	0–0	1–5
1997–98	Olympiacos	Group Stage (Group D)	(Portugal) Porto	1–0	1–2
1997–98	Olympiacos	Group Stage (Group D)	(Norway) Rosenborg	2–2	1–5
1998–99	Olympiacos	2nd Qualifying Round	(Cyprus) Anorthosis Famagusta	2–1	4–2
1998–99	Olympiacos	Group Stage (Group A)	(Netherlands) Ajax	1–0	0–2
1998–99	Olympiacos	Group Stage (Group A)	(Portugal) Porto	2–1	2–2
1998–99	Olympiacos	Group Stage (Group A)	Croatia Zagreb	2–0	1–1
1998–99	Olympiacos	Quarter-finals	(Italy) Juventus	1–1	1–2
1998–99	Panathinaikos	2nd Qualifying Round	(Romania) Steaua București	6–3	2–2
1998–99	Panathinaikos	Group Stage (Group E)	(France) Lens	1–0	0–1
1998–99	Panathinaikos	Group Stage (Group E)	(England) Arsenal	1–3	1–2
1998–99	Panathinaikos	Group Stage (Group E)	(Ukraine) Dynamo Kyiv	2–1	1–2
1999–2000	Olympiacos	First Group Stage (Group E)	(Spain) Real Madrid	3–3	0–3
1999–2000	Olympiacos	First Group Stage (Group E)	(Portugal) Porto	1–0	0–2
1999–2000	Olympiacos	First Group Stage (Group E)	(Norway) Molde	3–1	2–3
1999–2000	AEK Athens	3rd Qualifying Round	(Sweden) AIK	0–0	0–1
2000–01	Olympiacos	First Group Stage (Group C)	(Spain) Valencia	1–0	1–2
2000–01	Olympiacos	First Group Stage (Group C)	(France) Lyon	2–1	0–1
2000–01	Olympiacos	First Group Stage (Group C)	(Netherlands) Heerenveen	2–0	0–1
2000–01	Panathinaikos	3rd Qualifying Round	(Poland) Polonia Warsaw	2–1	2–2
2000–01	Panathinaikos	First Group Stage (Group E)	(Italy) Juventus	3–1	1–2
2000–01	Panathinaikos	First Group Stage (Group E)	(Spain) Deportivo La Coruña	1–1	0–1
2000–01	Panathinaikos	First Group Stage (Group E)	(Germany) Hamburger SV	0–0	1–0
2000–01	Panathinaikos	Second Group Stage (Group A)	(England) Manchester United	1–1	1–3
2000–01	Panathinaikos	Second Group Stage (Group A)	(Spain) Valencia	0–0	1–2
2000–01	Panathinaikos	Second Group Stage (Group A)	(Austria) Sturm Graz	1–2	0–2
2001–02	Olympiacos	First Group Stage (Group G)	(England) Manchester United	0–2	0–3
2001–02	Olympiacos	First Group Stage (Group G)	(Spain) Deportivo La Coruña	1–1	2–2
2001–02	Olympiacos	First Group Stage (Group G)	(France) Lille	2–1	1–3
2001–02	Panathinaikos	3rd Qualifying Round	(Czech Republic) Slavia Prague	1–0	2–1
2001–02	Panathinaikos	First Group Stage (Group C)	(England) Arsenal	1–0	1–2
2001–02	Panathinaikos	First Group Stage (Group C)	(Spain) Mallorca	2–0	0–1
2001–02	Panathinaikos	First Group Stage (Group C)	(Germany) Schalke 04	2–0	2–0
2001–02	Panathinaikos	Second Group Stage (Group C)	(Spain) Real Madrid	2–2	0–3
2001–02	Panathinaikos	Second Group Stage (Group C)	(Portugal) Porto	0–0	1–2
2001–02	Panathinaikos	Second Group Stage (Group C)	(Czech Republic) Sparta Prague	2–1	2–0
2001–02	Panathinaikos	Quarter-finals	(Spain) Barcelona	1–0	1–3
2002–03	Olympiacos	First Group Stage (Group F)	(England) Manchester United	2–3	0–4
2002–03	Olympiacos	First Group Stage (Group F)	(Germany) Bayer Leverkusen	6–2	0–2
2002–03	Olympiacos	First Group Stage (Group F)	(Israel) Maccabi Haifa	3–3	0–3
2002–03	AEK Athens	3rd Qualifying Round	(Cyprus) APOEL	1–0	3–2
2002–03	AEK Athens	First Group Stage (Group C)	(Spain) Real Madrid	3–3	2–2
2002–03	AEK Athens	First Group Stage (Group C)	(Italy) Roma	0–0	1–1
2002–03	AEK Athens	First Group Stage (Group C)	(Belgium) Genk	1–1	0–0
2003–04	Olympiacos	Group Stage (Group D)	(Italy) Juventus	1–2	0–7
2003–04	Olympiacos	Group Stage (Group D)	(Turkey) Galatasaray	3–0	0–1
2003–04	Olympiacos	Group Stage (Group D)	(Spain) Real Sociedad	2–2	0–1
2003–04	Panathinaikos	Group Stage (Group E)	(England) Manchester United	0–1	0–5
2003–04	Panathinaikos	Group Stage (Group E)	(Germany) VfB Stuttgart	1–3	0–2
2003–04	Panathinaikos	Group Stage (Group E)	(Scotland) Rangers	1–1	3–1
2003–04	AEK Athens	3rd Qualifying Round	(Switzerland) Grasshopper	3–1	0–1
2003–04	AEK Athens	Group Stage (Group C)	(Spain) Deportivo La Coruña	1–1	0–3
2003–04	AEK Athens	Group Stage (Group C)	(Netherlands) PSV Eindhoven	0–1	0–2
2003–04	AEK Athens	Group Stage (Group C)	(France) Monaco	0–0	0–4
2004–05	Panathinaikos	Group Stage (Group E)	(England) Arsenal	2–2	1–1
2004–05	Panathinaikos	Group Stage (Group E)	(Netherlands) PSV Eindhoven	4–1	0–1
2004–05	Panathinaikos	Group Stage (Group E)	(Norway) Rosenborg	2–1	2–2
2004–05	Olympiacos	Group Stage (Group A)	(England) Liverpool	1–0	1–3
2004–05	Olympiacos	Group Stage (Group A)	(France) Monaco	1–0	1–2
2004–05	Olympiacos	Group Stage (Group A)	(Spain) Deportivo La Coruña	1–0	0–0
2004–05	PAOK	3rd Qualifying Round	(Israel) Maccabi Tel Aviv	0–3 ^{5}	0–1
2005–06	Olympiacos	Group Stage (Group F)	(Spain) Real Madrid	2–1	1–2
2005–06	Olympiacos	Group Stage (Group F)	(France) Lyon	1–4	1–2
2005–06	Olympiacos	Group Stage (Group F)	(Norway) Rosenborg	1–3	1–1
2005–06	Panathinaikos	3rd Qualifying Round	(Poland) Wisła Kraków	4–1 (a.e.t.)	1–3
2005–06	Panathinaikos	Group Stage (Group C)	(Spain) Barcelona	0–0	0–5
2005–06	Panathinaikos	Group Stage (Group C)	(Germany) Werder Bremen	2–1	1–5
2005–06	Panathinaikos	Group Stage (Group C)	(Italy) Udinese	1–2	0–3
2006–07	Olympiacos	Group Stage (Group D)	(Spain) Valencia	2–4	0–2
2006–07	Olympiacos	Group Stage (Group D)	(Italy) Roma	0–1	1–1
2006–07	Olympiacos	Group Stage (Group D)	(Ukraine) Shakhtar Donetsk	1–1	2–2
2006–07	AEK Athens	3rd Qualifying Round	(Scotland) Hearts	3–0	2–1
2006–07	AEK Athens	Group Stage (Group H)	(Italy) Milan	1–0	0–3
2006–07	AEK Athens	Group Stage (Group H)	(France) Lille	1–0	1–3
2006–07	AEK Athens	Group Stage (Group H)	(Belgium) Anderlecht	1–1	2–2
2007–08	Olympiacos	Group Stage (Group C)	(Spain) Real Madrid	0–0	2–4
2007–08	Olympiacos	Group Stage (Group C)	(Germany) Werder Bremen	3–0	3–1
2007–08	Olympiacos	Group Stage (Group C)	(Italy) Lazio	1–1	2–1
2007–08	Olympiacos	Round of 16	(England) Chelsea	0–0	0–3
2007–08	AEK Athens	3rd Qualifying Round	(Spain) Sevilla	1–4	0–2
2008–09	Olympiacos	3rd Qualifying Round	(Cyprus) Anorthosis Famagusta	1–0	0–3
2008–09	Panathinaikos	2nd Qualifying Round	(Georgia (country)) Dinamo Tbilisi	3–0	0–0
2008–09	Panathinaikos	3rd Qualifying Round	(Czech Republic) Sparta Prague	1–0	2–1
2008–09	Panathinaikos	Group Stage (Group B)	(Italy) Inter Milan	0–2	1–0
2008–09	Panathinaikos	Group Stage (Group B)	(Germany) Werder Bremen	2–2	3–0
2008–09	Panathinaikos	Group Stage (Group B)	(Cyprus) Anorthosis Famagusta	1–0	1–3
2008–09	Panathinaikos	Round of 16	(Spain) Villarreal	1–2	1–1
2009–10	Olympiacos	3rd Qualifying Round-C	(Slovakia) Slovan Bratislava	2–0	2–0
2009–10	Olympiacos	Play-off round-C	(Moldova) Sheriff Tiraspol	1–0	2–0
2009–10	Olympiacos	Group Stage (Group H)	(England) Arsenal	1–0	0–2
2009–10	Olympiacos	Group Stage (Group H)	(Netherlands) AZ Alkmaar	1–0	0–0
2009–10	Olympiacos	Group Stage (Group H)	(Belgium) Standard Liège	2–1	0–2
2009–10	Olympiacos	Round of 16	(France) Bordeaux	0–1	1–2
2009–10	Panathinaikos	3rd Qualifying Round-NC	(Czech Republic) Sparta Prague	3–0	1–3
2009–10	Panathinaikos	Play-off round-NC	(Spain) Atlético Madrid	2–3	0–2
2010–11	Panathinaikos	Group Stage (Group D)	(Spain) Barcelona	0–3	1–5
2010–11	Panathinaikos	Group Stage (Group D)	(Denmark) Copenhagen	0–2	1–3
2010–11	Panathinaikos	Group Stage (Group D)	(Russia) Rubin Kazan	0–0	0–0
2010–11	PAOK	3rd Qualifying Round-NC	(Netherlands) Ajax	3–3 (a)	1–1
2011–12	Olympiacos	Group Stage (Group F)	(England) Arsenal	3–1	1–2
2011–12	Olympiacos	Group Stage (Group F)	(France) Marseille	0–1	1–0
2011–12	Olympiacos	Group Stage (Group F)	(Germany) Borussia Dortmund	3–1	0–1
2011–12	Panathinaikos	3rd Qualifying Round-NC	(Denmark) Odense	3–4	1–1
2012–13	Olympiacos	Group Stage (Group B)	(England) Arsenal	2–1	1–3
2012–13	Olympiacos	Group Stage (Group B)	(Germany) Schalke 04	1–2	0–1
2012–13	Olympiacos	Group Stage (Group B)	(France) Montpellier	3–1	2–1
2012–13	Panathinaikos	3rd Qualifying Round-NC	(Scotland) Motherwell	3–0	2–0
2012–13	Panathinaikos	Play-off round-NC	(Spain) Málaga	0–0	0–2
2013–14	Olympiacos	Group Stage (Group C)	(Portugal) Benfica	1–0	1–1
2013–14	Olympiacos	Group Stage (Group C)	(France) Paris Saint-Germain	1–4	1–2
2013–14	Olympiacos	Group Stage (Group C)	(Belgium) Anderlecht	3–1	3–0
2013–14	Olympiacos	Round of 16	(England) Manchester United	2–0	0–3
2013–14	PAOK	3rd Qualifying Round-NC ^{6}	(Ukraine) Metalist Kharkiv	0–2	1–1
2013–14	PAOK	Play-off round-NC	(Germany) Schalke 04	2–3	1–1
2014–15	Olympiacos	Group Stage (Group A)	(Spain) Atlético Madrid	3–2	0–4
2014–15	Olympiacos	Group Stage (Group A)	(Italy) Juventus	1–0	2–3
2014–15	Olympiacos	Group Stage (Group A)	(Sweden) Malmö FF	4–2	0–2
2014–15	Panathinaikos	3rd Qualifying Round-NC	(Belgium) Standard Liège	1–2	0–0
2015–16	Olympiacos	Group Stage (Group F)	(Germany) Bayern Munich	0–3	0–4
2015–16	Olympiacos	Group Stage (Group F)	(England) Arsenal	0–3	3–2
2015–16	Olympiacos	Group Stage (Group F)	(Croatia) Dinamo Zagreb	2–1	1–0
2015–16	Panathinaikos	3rd Qualifying Round-NC	(Belgium) Club Brugge	2–1	0–3
2016–17	Olympiacos	3rd Qualifying Round-C	(Israel) Hapoel Be'er Sheva	0–0	0–1
2016–17	PAOK	3rd Qualifying Round-NC	(Netherlands) Ajax	1–2	1–1
2017–18	Olympiacos	3rd Qualifying Round-C	(Serbia) Partizan	2–2	3–1
2017–18	Olympiacos	Play-off round-C	(Croatia) Rijeka	2–1	1–0
2017–18	Olympiacos	Group Stage (Group D)	(Italy) Juventus	0–2	0–2
2017–18	Olympiacos	Group Stage (Group D)	(Spain) Barcelona	0–0	1–3
2017–18	Olympiacos	Group Stage (Group D)	(Portugal) Sporting Lisbon	2–3	1–3
2017–18	AEK Athens	3rd Qualifying Round-NC	(Russia) CSKA Moscow	0–2	0–1
2018–19	AEK Athens	3rd Qualifying Round-C	(Scotland) Celtic	2−1	1−1
2018–19	AEK Athens	Play-off Round-C	(Hungary) MOL Vidi	1−1	2−1
2018–19	AEK Athens	Group Stage (Group E)	(Germany) Bayern Munich	0−2	0−2
2018–19	AEK Athens	Group Stage (Group E)	(Portugal) Benfica	2−3	0−1
2018–19	AEK Athens	Group Stage (Group E)	(Netherlands) Ajax	0−2	0−3
2018–19	PAOK	2nd Qualifying Round-NC	(Switzerland) Basel	2–1	3−0
2018–19	PAOK	3rd Qualifying Round-NC	(Russia) Spartak Moscow	3−2	0−0
2018–19	PAOK	Play-off Round-NC	(Portugal) Benfica	1−4	1−1
2019–20	PAOK	3rd Qualifying Round-C	(Netherlands) Ajax	2–2	2–3
2019–20	Olympiacos	2nd Qualifying Round-NC	(Czech Republic) Viktoria Plzeň	4–0	0–0
2019–20	Olympiacos	3rd Qualifying Round-NC	(Turkey) İstanbul Başakşehir	2–0	1–0
2019–20	Olympiacos	Play-off Round-NC	(Russia) Krasnodar	4–0	2–1
2019–20	Olympiacos	Group Stage (Group B)	(Germany) Bayern Munich	2–3	0–2
2019–20	Olympiacos	Group Stage (Group B)	(England) Tottenham Hotspur	2–2	2–4
2019–20	Olympiacos	Group Stage (Group B)	(Serbia) Red Star Belgrade	1–0	1–3
2020–21	PAOK	2nd Qualifying Round-NC	(Turkey) Beşiktaş	3–1	
2020–21	PAOK	3rd Qualifying Round-NC	(Portugal) Benfica	2–1	
2020–21	PAOK	Play-off Round-NC	(Russia) Krasnodar	1–2	1–2
2020–21	Olympiacos	Play-off Round-C	(Cyprus) Omonia Nicosia	2–0	0–0
2020–21	Olympiacos	Group Stage (Group C)	(England) Manchester City	0–1	0–3
2020–21	Olympiacos	Group Stage (Group C)	(Portugal) Porto	0–2	0–2
2020–21	Olympiacos	Group Stage (Group C)	(France) Marseille	1–0	1–2
2021–22	Olympiacos	2nd Qualifying Round-C	(Azerbaijan) Neftçi Baku	1–0	1–0
2021–22	Olympiacos	3rd Qualifying Round-C	(Bulgaria) Ludogorets Razgrad	1–1	2–2 (1–4 p)
2022–23	Olympiacos	2nd Qualifying Round-C	(Israel) Maccabi Haifa	0–4	1–1
2023–24	Panathinaikos	2nd Qualifying Round-NC	(Ukraine) Dnipro-1	2–2	3–1
2023–24	Panathinaikos	3rd Qualifying Round-NC	(France) Marseille	1–0	1–2 (5–3 p)
2023–24	Panathinaikos	Play-off Round-NC	(Portugal) Braga	0–1	1–2
2023–24	AEK Athens	3rd Qualifying Round-C	(Croatia) Dinamo Zagreb	2–2	2–1
2023–24	AEK Athens	Play-off Round-C	(Belgium) Antwerp	1–2	0–1
2024–25	PAOK	2nd Qualifying Round-C	(Bosnia and Herzegovina) Borac Banja Luka	3–2	1–0
2024–25	PAOK	3rd Qualifying Round-C	(Sweden) Malmö FF	3–4 (a.e.t.)	2–2
2025–26	Panathinaikos	2nd Qualifying Round-NC	(Scotland) Rangers	1–1	0–2
2025–26	Olympiacos	League Phase (18th place)	(Spain) Real Madrid	3–4	
2025–26	Olympiacos	League Phase (18th place)	(Spain) Barcelona		1–6
2025–26	Olympiacos	League Phase (18th place)	(Germany) Bayer Leverkusen	2–0	
2025–26	Olympiacos	League Phase (18th place)	(England) Arsenal		0–2
2025–26	Olympiacos	League Phase (18th place)	(Netherlands) PSV Eindhoven	1–1	
2025–26	Olympiacos	League Phase (18th place)	(Netherlands) Ajax		2–1
2025–26	Olympiacos	League Phase (18th place)	(Cyprus) Pafos	0–0	
2025–26	Olympiacos	League Phase (18th place)	(Kazakhstan) Kairat		1–0
2025–26	Olympiacos	Knockout play-offs	(Germany) Bayer Leverkusen	0–2	0–0
2026–27	Olympiacos	3rd Qualifying Round-NC	(Netherlands) Nijmegen	0–0	1–2
2026–27	AEK Athens	Play-off Round-C	(Bulgaria) Levski Sofia	4–0	0–0
2026–27	AEK Athens	League Phase (29th place)	(Austria) LASK	1–0	
2026–27	AEK Athens	League Phase (29th place)	(Ukraine) Shakhtar Donetsk		1–3
2026–27	AEK Athens	League Phase (29th place)	(England) Manchester City		1–5
2026–27	AEK Athens	League Phase (29th place)	(Spain) Real Madrid	2–3	
2026–27	AEK Athens	League Phase (29th place)	(Italy) Como		
2026–27	AEK Athens	League Phase (29th place)	(Turkey) Galatasaray		
2026–27	AEK Athens	League Phase (29th place)	(Italy) Roma		
2026–27	AEK Athens	League Phase (29th place)	(Germany) Borussia Dortmund		

== European Cup Winners' Cup / UEFA Cup Winners' Cup ==
Season	Club	Round	Opponent	Home	Away
European Cup Winners' Cup
1961–62	Olympiacos	1st Round	(Czechoslovakia) Dynamo Žilina	2–3	0–1
1962–63^{b}	Olympiacos	1st Round	(Malta) Hibernians		
1963–64	Olympiacos	Preliminary Round	(Poland) Zagłębie Sosnowiec	2–1	0–1^{d}
1963–64	Olympiacos	1st Round	(France) Lyon	2–1	1–4
1964–65	AEK Athens	1st Round	(Socialist Federal Republic of Yugoslavia) Dinamo Zagreb	2–0	0–3
1965–66	Olympiacos	1st Round	(Cyprus) Omonia Nicosia	1–1	1–0
1965–66	Olympiacos	2nd Round	(England) West Ham United	2–2	0–4
1966–67	AEK Athens	1st Round	(Portugal) Braga	0–1	2–3
1967–68	Panathinaikos	1st Round	(West Germany) Bayern Munich	1–2	0–5
1968–69	Olympiacos	1st Round	(Iceland) Reykjavik	2–0	2–0
1968–69	Olympiacos	2nd Round	(Scotland) Dunfermline Athletic	3–0	0–4
1969–70	Olympiacos	1st Round	(Poland) Górnik Zabrze	2–2	0–5
1970–71	Aris	1st Round	(England) Chelsea	1–1	1–5
1971–72	Olympiacos	1st Round	(Soviet Union) Dynamo Moscow	0–2	2–1
1972–73	PAOK	1st Round	(Austria) Rapid Wien	2–2 (a)	0–0
1973–74	PAOK	1st Round	(Poland) Legia Warsaw	1–0	1–1
1973–74	PAOK	2nd Round	(France) Lyon	4–0	3–3
1973–74	PAOK	Quarter-finals	(Italy) Milan	2–2	0–3
1974–75	PAOK	1st Round	(Socialist Federal Republic of Yugoslavia) Red Star Belgrade	1–0	0–2 (a.e.t.)
1975–76	Panathinaikos	1st Round	(East Germany) Sachsenring Zwickau	0–0	0–2
1976–77	Iraklis	1st Round	(Cyprus) APOEL	0–0	0–2
1977–78	PAOK	1st Round	(Poland) Zagłębie Sosnowiec	2–0	2–0
1977–78	PAOK	2nd Round	(Denmark) Vejle	2–1	0–3
1978–79	PAOK	1st Round	(Switzerland) Servette	2–0	0–4
1979–80	Panionios	1st Round	(Netherlands) Twente	4–0	1–3
1979–80	Panionios	2nd Round	(Sweden) IFK Göteborg	1–0	0–2
1980–81	Kastoria	1st Round	(Soviet Union) Dinamo Tbilisi	0–0	0–2
1981–82	PAOK	1st Round	(West Germany) Eintracht Frankfurt	2–0 (4–5 p)	0–2
1982–83	Panathinaikos	1st Round	Austria Wien	2–1	0–2
1983–84	AEK Athens	1st Round	(Hungary) Újpest	2–0	1–4
1984–85	AEL	1st Round	(Hungary) Siófok Bányász	2–0	1–1
1984–85	AEL	2nd Round	(Switzerland) Servette	2–1	1–0
1984–85	AEL	Quarter-finals	(Soviet Union) Dynamo Moscow	0–0	0–1
1985–86	AEL	1st Round	(Italy) Sampdoria	1–1	0–1
1986–87	Olympiacos	1st Round	Union Luxembourg	3–0	3–0
1986–87	Olympiacos	2nd Round	(Netherlands) Ajax	1–1	0–4
1987–88	OFI	1st Round	(Bulgaria) Vitosha Sofia	3–1	0–1
1987–88	OFI	2nd Round	(Italy) Atalanta	1–0	0–2
1988–89	Panathinaikos	1st Round	(Cyprus) Omonia Nicosia	2–0	1–0
1988–89	Panathinaikos	2nd Round	(Bulgaria) CFKA Sredets Sofia	0–1	0–2
1989–90	Panathinaikos	1st Round	(Wales) Swansea City	3–2	3–3
1989–90	Panathinaikos	2nd Round	(Romania) Dinamo București	0–2	1–6
1990–91	Olympiacos	1st Round	(Albania) Flamurtari	3–1	2–0
1990–91	Olympiacos	2nd Round	(Italy) Sampdoria	0–1	1–3
1991–92	Athinaikos	1st Round	(England) Manchester United	0–0	0–2 (a.e.t.)
1992–93	Olympiacos	1st Round	(Ukraine) Chornomorets Odesa	0–1	3–0
1992–93	Olympiacos	2nd Round	(France) Monaco	0–0	1–0
1992–93	Olympiacos	Quarter-finals	(Spain) Atlético Madrid	1–1	1–3
1993–94	Panathinaikos	1st Round	(Republic of Ireland) Shelbourne	3–0	2–1
1993–94	Panathinaikos	2nd Round	(Germany) Bayer Leverkusen	1–4	2–1
UEFA Cup Winners' Cup
1994–95	Panathinaikos	1st Round	(Bulgaria) Pirin Blagoevgrad	6–1	2–0
1994–95	Panathinaikos	2nd Round	(Belgium) Club Brugge	0–0	0–1
1995–96	AEK Athens	1st Round	(Switzerland) Sion	2–0	2–2
1995–96	AEK Athens	2nd Round	(Germany) Borussia Mönchengladbach	0–1	1–4
1996–97	AEK Athens	1st Round	(Slovakia) Chemlon Humenné	1–0	2–1
1996–97	AEK Athens	2nd Round	(Slovenia) Olimpija Ljubljana	4–0	2–0
1996–97	AEK Athens	Quarter-finals	(France) Paris Saint-Germain	0–3	0–0
1997–98	AEK Athens	1st Round	(Latvia) Dinaburg	5–0	4–2
1997–98	AEK Athens	2nd Round	(Austria) Sturm Graz	2–0	0–1
1997–98	AEK Athens	Quarter-finals	(Russia) Lokomotiv Moscow	0–0	1–2
1998–99	Panionios	1st Round	(Finland) Haka	2–0	3–1
1998–99	Panionios	2nd Round	(Cyprus) Apollon Limassol	3–2	1–0
1998–99	Panionios	Quarter-finals	(Italy) Lazio	0–4	0–3

== Inter-Cities Fairs Cup ==
Season	Club	Round	Opponent	Home	Away
1961–62^{9}	Iraklis	1st Round	bye		
1961–62^{9}	Iraklis	2nd Round	(Socialist Federal Republic of Yugoslavia) Novi Sad XI	2–1	1–9
1963–64	Iraklis	1st Round	(Spain) Real Zaragoza	0–3	1–6
1964–65	Aris	1st Round	(Italy) Roma	0–0	0–3
1965–66	PAOK	1st Round	(Austria) Wiener SC	2–1	0–6
1965–66	Aris	2nd Round	(West Germany) Köln	2–1	0–2
1966–67	Aris	1st Round	(Italy) Juventus	0–2	0–5
1967–68	PAOK	1st Round	(Belgium) RFC Liège	0–2	2–3
1968–69	Aris	1st Round	(Malta) Hibernians	1–0	6–0
1968–69	Aris	2nd Round	(Hungary) Újpest	1–2	1–9
1968–69	Panathinaikos	1st Round	(Belgium) Daring Molenbeek	2–0	1–2
1968–69	Panathinaikos	2nd Round	(Spain) Athletic Bilbao	0–0	0–1
1969–70	Aris	1st Round	(Italy) Cagliari	1–1	0–3^{10}
1969–70	Panionios	1st Round	(East Germany) Hansa Rostock	2–0	0–3
1970–71	AEK Athens	1st Round	(Netherlands) Twente	0–1	0–3
1970–71	PAOK	1st Round	(Romania) Dinamo București	1–0	0–5

== UEFA Cup / UEFA Europa League ==
Season	Club	Round	Opponent	Home	Away
UEFA Cup
1971–72	Panionios	1st Round	(Spain) Atlético Madrid	1–0 (a)	1–2
1971–72	Panionios	2nd Round	(Hungary) Ferencváros		0–6^{11}
1972–73	AEK Athens	1st Round	(Hungary) Salgótarjáni BTC	3–1	1–1
1972–73	AEK Athens	2nd Round	(England) Liverpool	1–3	0–3
1972–73	Olympiacos	1st Round	(Italy) Cagliari	2–1	1–0
1972–73	Olympiacos	2nd Round	(England) Tottenham Hotspur	1–0	0–4
1973–74	Panathinaikos	1st Round	(Socialist Federal Republic of Yugoslavia) OFK Beograd	1–2	1–0 (a)
1973–74	Panachaiki	1st Round	(Austria) Grazer AK	2–1	1–0
1973–74	Panachaiki	2nd Round	(Netherlands) Twente	1–1	0–7
1974–75	Aris	1st Round	(Austria) Rapid Wien	1–0	1–3
1974–75	Panathinaikos	1st Round	(Switzerland) Grasshopper	2–1	0–2
1975–76	PAOK	1st Round	(Spain) Barcelona	1–0	1–6
1975–76	AEK Athens	1st Round	(Socialist Federal Republic of Yugoslavia) Vojvodina	3–1	0–0
1975–76	AEK Athens	2nd Round	(Czechoslovakia) Inter Bratislava	3–1 (a)	0–2
1976–77	Olympiacos	1st Round	(Romania) Sportul Studențesc	2–1	0–3
1976–77	AEK Athens	1st Round	(Soviet Union) Dynamo Moscow	2–0	1–2 (a.e.t.)
1976–77	AEK Athens	2nd Round	(England) Derby County	2–0	3–2
1976–77	AEK Athens	3rd Round	(Socialist Federal Republic of Yugoslavia) Red Star Belgrade	2–0	1–3 (a)
1976–77	AEK Athens	Quarter-finals	(England) Queens Park Rangers	3–0 (7–6 p)	0–3
1976–77	AEK Athens	Semi-finals	(Italy) Juventus	0–1	1–4
1977–78	Olympiacos	1st Round	(Socialist Federal Republic of Yugoslavia) Dinamo Zagreb	3–1	1–5
1977–78	AEK Athens	1st Round	(Romania) Târgu Mureș	3–0	0–1
1977–78	AEK Athens	2nd Round	(Belgium) Standard Liège	2–2	1–4
1978–79	Olympiacos	1st Round	(Bulgaria) Levski Sofia	2–1	1–3 (a.e.t.)
1978–79	Panathinaikos	1st Round	(Romania) Argeș Pitești	1–2	0–3
1979–80	Olympiacos	1st Round	(Italy) Napoli	1–0	0–2
1979–80	Aris	1st Round	(Portugal) Benfica	3–1	1–2
1979–80	Aris	2nd Round	(Italy) Perugia	1–1	3–0
1979–80	Aris	3rd Round	(France) Saint-Étienne	3–3	1–4
1980–81	Aris	1st Round	(England) Ipswich Town	3–1	1–5
1980–81	Panathinaikos	1st Round	(Italy) Juventus	4–2	0–4
1981–82	Panathinaikos	1st Round	(England) Arsenal	0–2	0–1
1981–82	Aris	1st Round	(Malta) Sliema Wanderers	4–0	4–2
1981–82	Aris	2nd Round	(Belgium) Lokeren	1–1	0–4
1982–83	AEK Athens	1st Round	(West Germany) Köln	0–1^{12}	0–5
1982–83	PAOK	1st Round	(France) Sochaux	1–0	1–2 (a.e.t.) (a)
1982–83	PAOK	2nd Round	(Spain) Sevilla	2–0	0–4
1983–84	AEL	1st Round	(Hungary) Budapest Honvéd	2–0	0–3 (a.e.t.)
1983–84	PAOK	1st Round	(Bulgaria) Lokomotiv Plovdiv	3–1	2–1
1983–84	PAOK	2nd Round	(West Germany) Bayern Munich	0–0	0–0 (8–9 p)
1984–85	Olympiacos	1st Round	(Switzerland) Neuchâtel Xamax	1–0	2–2
1984–85	Olympiacos	2nd Round	(Romania) Universitatea Craiova	0–1	0–1
1985–86	AEK Athens	1st Round	(Spain) Real Madrid	1–0	0–5
1985–86	Panathinaikos	1st Round	(Italy) Torino	1–1	1–2
1986–87	AEK Athens	1st Round	(Italy) Inter Milan	0–1	0–2
1986–87	OFI	1st Round	(Socialist Federal Republic of Yugoslavia) Hajduk Split	1–0	0–4
1987–88	Panionios	1st Round	(France) Toulouse	0–1	1–5
1987–88	Panathinaikos	1st Round	(France) Auxerre	2–0	2–3
1987–88	Panathinaikos	2nd Round	(Italy) Juventus	1–0	2–3 (a)
1987–88	Panathinaikos	3rd Round	(Hungary) Budapest Honvéd	5–1	2–5
1987–88	Panathinaikos	Quarter-finals	(Belgium) Club Brugge	2–2	0–1
1988–89	AEK Athens	1st Round	(Spain) Athletic Bilbao	1–0	0–2
1988–89	PAOK	1st Round	(Italy) Napoli	1–1	0–1
1989–90	Iraklis	1st Round	(Switzerland) Sion	1–0	0–2
1989–90	Olympiacos	1st Round	(Socialist Federal Republic of Yugoslavia) Rad	2–0	1–2
1989–90	Olympiacos	2nd Round	(Austria) First Vienna	1–1 (a)	2–2
1989–90	Olympiacos	3rd Round	(France) Auxerre	1–1	0–0 (a)
1990–91	Iraklis	1st Round	(Spain) Valencia	0–0	0–2 (a.e.t.)
1990–91	PAOK	1st Round	(Spain) Sevilla	0–0 (3–4 p)	0–0
1991–92	PAOK	1st Round	(Belgium) Mechelen	1–1	1–0
1991–92	PAOK	2nd Round	(Austria) Tirol Innsbruck	0–2	0–2
1991–92	AEK Athens	1st Round	(Albania) Vllaznia	2–0	1–0
1991–92	AEK Athens	2nd Round	(Soviet Union) Spartak Moscow	2–1	0–0
1991–92	AEK Athens	3rd Round	(Italy) Torino	2–2	0–1
1992–93	PAOK	1st Round	(France) Paris Saint-Germain	0–3 ^{13}	0–2
1992–93	Panathinaikos	1st Round	(Romania) Electroputere Craiova	4–0	6–0
1992–93	Panathinaikos	2nd Round	(Italy) Juventus	0–1	0–0
1993–94	Olympiacos	1st Round	(Bulgaria) Botev Plovdiv	5–1	3–2
1993–94	Olympiacos	2nd Round	(Spain) Tenerife	4–3 (a)	1–2
1993–94	OFI	1st Round	(Czech Republic) Slavia Prague	1–0	1–1
1993–94	OFI	2nd Round	(Spain) Atlético Madrid	2–0	0–1
1993–94	OFI	3rd Round	(Portugal) Boavista	1–4	0–2
1994–95	Aris	Qualifying Round	(Israel) Hapoel Be'er Sheva	3–1	2–1
1994–95	Aris	1st Round	(Poland) GKS Katowice	1–0 (3–4 p)	0–1
1994–95	Olympiacos	1st Round	(France) Marseille	1–2	0–3
1995–96	Apollon Athens	Qualifying Round	(Slovenia) Olimpija Ljubljana	1–0	1–3
1995–96	Olympiacos	Qualifying Round	(Bulgaria) Slavia Sofia	1–0	2–0
1995–96	Olympiacos	1st Round	(Slovenia) Maribor	2–0	3–1
1995–96	Olympiacos	2nd Round	(Spain) Sevilla	2–1 (a.e.t.) (a)	0–1
1996–97	Iraklis	2nd Qualifying Round	(Cyprus) APOEL	0–1	1–2
1996–97	Olympiacos	1st Round	(Hungary) Ferencváros	2–2	1–3
1996–97	Panathinaikos (CL-Q)	1st Round	(Poland) Legia Warsaw	4–2	0–2 (a)
1997–98	OFI	2nd Qualifying Round	(Iceland) Reykjavik	3–1	0–0
1997–98	OFI	1st Round	(Hungary) Ferencváros	3–0	1–2
1997–98	OFI	2nd Round	(France) Auxerre	3–2	1–3
1997–98	PAOK	2nd Qualifying Round	(Slovakia) Spartak Trnava	5–3	1–0
1997–98	PAOK	1st Round	(England) Arsenal	1–0	1–1
1997–98	PAOK	2nd Round	(Spain) Atlético Madrid	4–4	2–5
1998–99	PAOK	2nd Qualifying Round	(Scotland) Rangers	0–0	0–2
1998–99	AEK Athens	2nd Qualifying Round	(Hungary) Ferencváros	4–0	2–4
1998–99	AEK Athens	1st Round	(Netherlands) Vitesse	3–3	0–3
1999–2000	Ionikos	1st Round	(France) Nantes	1–3	0–1
1999–2000	Aris	1st Round	(Switzerland) Servette	1–1	2–1 (a.e.t.)
1999–2000	Aris	2nd Round	(Spain) Celta Vigo	2–2	0–2
1999–2000	PAOK	1st Round	(Georgia (country)) Locomotive Tbilisi	2–0	7–0
1999–2000	PAOK	2nd Round	(Portugal) Benfica	1–2	2–1 (1–4 p)
1999–2000	AEK Athens (CL-Q)	1st Round	(Georgia (country)) Torpedo Kutaisi	6–1	1–0
1999–2000	AEK Athens (CL-Q)	2nd Round	(Hungary) MTK Budapest	1–0 (a)	1–2
1999–2000	AEK Athens (CL-Q)	3rd Round	(France) Monaco	2–2	0–1
1999–2000	Panathinaikos	1st Round	(Slovenia) Gorica	2–0	1–0
1999–2000	Panathinaikos	2nd Round	(Austria) Grazer AK	1–0 (a)	1–2
1999–2000	Panathinaikos	3rd Round	(Spain) Deportivo La Coruña	1–1	2–4
1999–2000	Olympiacos (CL-G)	3rd Round	(Italy) Juventus	1–3	2–1
2000–01	Iraklis	1st Round	(France) Gueugnon	1–0	0–0
2000–01	Iraklis	2nd Round	(Germany) Kaiserslautern	1–3	3–2
2000–01	OFI	1st Round	(Serbia and Montenegro) Napredak Kruševac	6–0	0–0
2000–01	OFI	2nd Round	(Czech Republic) Slavia Prague	2–2	1–4
2000–01	PAOK	1st Round	(Israel) Beitar Jerusalem	3–1	3–3
2000–01	PAOK	2nd Round	(Italy) Udinese	3–0 (a.e.t.)	0–1
2000–01	PAOK	3rd Round	(Netherlands) PSV Eindhoven	0–1	0–3
2000–01	Olympiacos (CL-G)	3rd Round	(England) Liverpool	2–2	0–2
2000–01	AEK Athens	1st Round	(Hungary) Vasas	2–0	2–2
2000–01	AEK Athens	2nd Round	(Denmark) Herfølge	5–0	1–2
2000–01	AEK Athens	3rd Round	(Germany) Bayer Leverkusen	2–0	4–4
2000–01	AEK Athens	Round of 16	(Spain) Barcelona	0–1	0–5
2001–02	PAOK (CW)	1st Round	(Austria) Kärnten	4–0	0–0
2001–02	PAOK (CW)	2nd Round	(Czech Republic) Marila Příbram	6–1	2–2
2001–02	PAOK (CW)	3rd Round	(Netherlands) PSV Eindhoven	3–2	1–4
2001–02	AEK Athens	Qualifying Round	(Luxembourg) Grevenmacher	6–0	2–0
2001–02	AEK Athens	1st Round	(Scotland) Hibernian	2–0	2–3 (a.e.t.)
2001–02	AEK Athens	2nd Round	(Croatia) Osijek	3–2	2–1
2001–02	AEK Athens	3rd Round	(Bulgaria) Litex Lovech	3–2	1–1
2001–02	AEK Athens	Round of 16	(Italy) Inter Milan	2–2	1–3
2002–03	Iraklis	1st Round	(Cyprus) Anorthosis Famagusta	4–2	1–3 (a)
2002–03	Skoda Xanthi	1st Round	(Italy) Lazio	0–0	0–4
2002–03	PAOK	1st Round	(Portugal) Leixões	4–1	1–2
2002–03	PAOK	2nd Round	(Switzerland) Grasshopper	2–1	1–1
2002–03	PAOK	3rd Round	(Czech Republic) Slavia Prague	1–0	0–4
2002–03	AEK Athens (CL-G)	3rd Round	(Israel) Maccabi Haifa	4–0	4–1
2002–03	AEK Athens (CL-G)	Round of 16	(Spain) Málaga	0–1	0–0
2002–03	Panathinaikos	1st Round	(Bulgaria) Litex Lovech	2–1 (a.e.t.)	1–0
2002–03	Panathinaikos	2nd Round	(Turkey) Fenerbahçe	4–1	1–1
2002–03	Panathinaikos	3rd Round	(Czech Republic) Slovan Liberec	1–0	2–2
2002–03	Panathinaikos	Round of 16	(Belgium) Anderlecht	3–0	0–2
2002–03	Panathinaikos	Quarter-finals	(Portugal) Porto	0–2 (a.e.t.)	1–0
2003–04	Aris	1st Round	(Moldova) Zimbru Chișinău	2–1	1–1
2003–04	Aris	2nd Round	(Italy) Perugia	1–1	0–2
2003–04	Panionios	1st Round	(Denmark) Nordsjælland	2–1	1–0
2003–04	Panionios	2nd Round	(Spain) Barcelona	0–3	0–2
2003–04	PAOK	1st Round	(Norway) Lyn Oslo	0–1	3–0
2003–04	PAOK	2nd Round	(Hungary) Debrecen	1–1	0–0 (a)
2003–04	Panathinaikos (CL-G)	3rd Round	(France) Auxerre	0–1	0–0
2004–05	PAOK (CL-Q)	1st Round	(Netherlands) AZ Alkmaar	2–3	1–2
2004–05	AEK Athens	1st Round	(Slovenia) Gorica	1–0	1–1
2004–05	AEK Athens	Group Stage (Group H)	(Russia) Zenit Saint Petersburg		1–5
2004–05	AEK Athens	Group Stage (Group H)	(France) Lille	1–2	
2004–05	AEK Athens	Group Stage (Group H)	(Spain) Sevilla		2–3
2004–05	AEK Athens	Group Stage (Group H)	(Germany) Alemannia Aachen	0–2	
2004–05	Egaleo	1st Round	(Turkey) Gençlerbirliği	1–0	1–1
2004–05	Egaleo	Group Stage (Group E)	(England) Middlesbrough	0–1	
2004–05	Egaleo	Group Stage (Group E)	(Serbia and Montenegro) Partizan		0–4
2004–05	Egaleo	Group Stage (Group E)	(Italy) Lazio	2–2	
2004–05	Egaleo	Group Stage (Group E)	(Spain) Villarreal		0–4
2004–05	Panionios	1st Round	(Italy) Udinese	3–1	0–1
2004–05	Panionios	Group Stage (Group D)	(England) Newcastle United	0–1	
2004–05	Panionios	Group Stage (Group D)	(Portugal) Sporting Lisbon		1–4
2004–05	Panionios	Group Stage (Group D)	(Georgia (country)) Dinamo Tbilisi	5–2	
2004–05	Panionios	Group Stage (Group D)	(France) Sochaux		0–1
2004–05	Panathinaikos (CL-G)	Round of 32	(Spain) Sevilla	1–0	0–2
2004–05	Olympiacos (CL-G)	Round of 32	(France) Sochaux	1–0	1–0
2004–05	Olympiacos (CL-G)	Round of 16	(England) Newcastle United	1–3	0–4
2005–06	AEK Athens	1st Round	(Russia) Zenit Saint Petersburg	0–1	0–0
2005–06	Aris (CF)	1st Round	(Italy) Roma	0–0	1–5
2005–06	Skoda Xanthi	1st Round	(England) Middlesbrough	0–0	0–2
2005–06	PAOK	1st Round	(Ukraine) Metalurh Donetsk	1–1	2–2 (a)
2005–06	PAOK	Group Stage (Group G)	(Ukraine) Shakhtar Donetsk		0–1
2005–06	PAOK	Group Stage (Group G)	(Germany) VfB Stuttgart	1–2	
2005–06	PAOK	Group Stage (Group G)	(Romania) Rapid București		0–1
2005–06	PAOK	Group Stage (Group G)	(France) Rennes	5–1	
2006–07	Atromitos	1st Round	(Spain) Sevilla	1–2	0–4
2006–07	Iraklis	1st Round	(Poland) Wisła Kraków	0–2 (a.e.t.)	1–0
2006–07	Skoda Xanthi	1st Round	(Romania) Dinamo București	3–4	1–4
2006–07	Panathinaikos	1st Round	(Ukraine) Metalurh Zaporizhzhia	1–1	1–0
2006–07	Panathinaikos	Group Stage (Group G)	(Israel) Hapoel Tel Aviv	2–0	
2006–07	Panathinaikos	Group Stage (Group G)	(Czech Republic) Mladá Boleslav		1–0
2006–07	Panathinaikos	Group Stage (Group G)	(Romania) Rapid București	0–0	
2006–07	Panathinaikos	Group Stage (Group G)	(France) Paris Saint-Germain		0–4
2006–07	Panathinaikos	Round of 32	(France) Lens	0–0	1–3
2006–07	AEK Athens (CL-G)	Round of 32	(France) Paris Saint-Germain	0–2	0–2
2007–08	AEL (CW)	1st Round	(England) Blackburn Rovers	2–0	1–2
2007–08	AEL (CW)	Group Stage (Group A)	(England) Everton		1–3
2007–08	AEL (CW)	Group Stage (Group A)	(Russia) Zenit Saint Petersburg	2–3	
2007–08	AEL (CW)	Group Stage (Group A)	(Netherlands) AZ Alkmaar		0–1
2007–08	AEL (CW)	Group Stage (Group A)	(Germany) Nürnberg	1–3	
2007–08	Aris	1st Round	(Spain) Real Zaragoza	1–0	1–2 (a)
2007–08	Aris	Group Stage (Group F)	(Serbia) Red Star Belgrade	3–0	
2007–08	Aris	Group Stage (Group F)	(England) Bolton Wanderers		1–1
2007–08	Aris	Group Stage (Group F)	(Portugal) Braga	1–1	
2007–08	Aris	Group Stage (Group F)	(Germany) Bayern Munich		0–6
2007–08	Panionios	1st Round	(France) Sochaux	0–1	2–0
2007–08	Panionios	Group Stage (Group H)	(Sweden) Helsingborg		1–1
2007–08	Panionios	Group Stage (Group H)	(Turkey) Galatasaray	0–3	
2007–08	Panionios	Group Stage (Group H)	Austria Wien		1–0
2007–08	Panionios	Group Stage (Group H)	(France) Bordeaux	2–3	
2007–08	AEK Athens (CL-Q)	1st Round	(Austria) Red Bull Salzburg	3–0	0–1
2007–08	AEK Athens (CL-Q)	Group Stage (Group C)	(Sweden) Elfsborg		1–1
2007–08	AEK Athens (CL-Q)	Group Stage (Group C)	(Italy) Fiorentina	1–1	
2007–08	AEK Athens (CL-Q)	Group Stage (Group C)	(Czech Republic) Mladá Boleslav		1–0
2007–08	AEK Athens (CL-Q)	Group Stage (Group C)	(Spain) Villarreal	1–2	
2007–08	AEK Athens (CL-Q)	Round of 32	(Spain) Getafe	1–1	0–3
2007–08	Panathinaikos	1st Round	(Slovakia) Artmedia Bratislava	3–0	2–1
2007–08	Panathinaikos	Group Stage (Group B)	(Scotland) Aberdeen	3–0	
2007–08	Panathinaikos	Group Stage (Group B)	(Denmark) Copenhagen		1–0
2007–08	Panathinaikos	Group Stage (Group B)	(Russia) Lokomotiv Moscow	2–0	
2007–08	Panathinaikos	Group Stage (Group B)	(Spain) Atlético Madrid		1–2
2007–08	Panathinaikos	Round of 32	(Scotland) Rangers	1–1 (a)	0–0
2008–09	AEK Athens	2nd Qualifying Round	(Cyprus) Omonia Nicosia	0–1	2–2
2008–09	Aris	2nd Qualifying Round	(Croatia) Slaven Belupo	1–0	0–2
2008–09	Olympiacos (CL-Q)	1st Round	(Denmark) Nordsjælland	5–0	2–0
2008–09	Olympiacos (CL-Q)	Group Stage (Group B)	(Turkey) Galatasaray		0–1
2008–09	Olympiacos (CL-Q)	Group Stage (Group B)	(Portugal) Benfica	5–1	
2008–09	Olympiacos (CL-Q)	Group Stage (Group B)	(Ukraine) Metalist Kharkiv		0–1
2008–09	Olympiacos (CL-Q)	Group Stage (Group B)	(Germany) Hertha BSC	4–0	
2008–09	Olympiacos (CL-Q)	Round of 32	(France) Saint-Étienne	1–3	1–2
UEFA Europa League
2009–10	AEL	2nd Qualifying Round	(Iceland) Reykjavik	1–1	0–2
2009–10	PAOK	3rd Qualifying Round	(Norway) Vålerenga	0–1 (a)	2–1
2009–10	PAOK	Play-off Round	(Netherlands) Heerenveen	1–1	0–0 (a)
2009–10	AEK Athens	Play-off Round	(Romania) Vaslui	3–0	1–2
2009–10	AEK Athens	Group Stage (Group I)	(Portugal) Benfica	1–0	1–2
2009–10	AEK Athens	Group Stage (Group I)	(England) Everton	0–1	0–4
2009–10	AEK Athens	Group Stage (Group I)	(Belarus) BATE Borisov	2–2	1–2
2009–10	Panathinaikos (CL-Q)	Group Stage (Group F)	(Turkey) Galatasaray	1–3	0–1
2009–10	Panathinaikos (CL-Q)	Group Stage (Group F)	(Romania) Dinamo București	3–0	1–0
2009–10	Panathinaikos (CL-Q)	Group Stage (Group F)	(Austria) Sturm Graz	1–0	1–0
2009–10	Panathinaikos (CL-Q)	Round of 32	(Italy) Roma	3–2	3–2
2009–10	Panathinaikos (CL-Q)	Round of 16	(Belgium) Standard Liège	1–3	0–1
2010–11	Olympiacos	2nd Qualifying Round	(Albania) Besa Kavajë	6–1	5–0
2010–11	Olympiacos	3rd Qualifying Round	(Israel) Maccabi Tel Aviv	2–1	0–1 (a)
2010–11	AEK Athens	Play-off Round	(Scotland) Dundee United	1–1	1–0
2010–11	AEK Athens	Group Stage (Group G)	(Russia) Zenit Saint Petersburg	0–3	2–4
2010–11	AEK Athens	Group Stage (Group G)	(Belgium) Anderlecht	1–1	0–3
2010–11	AEK Athens	Group Stage (Group G)	(Croatia) Hajduk Split	3–1	3–1
2010–11	Aris	3rd Qualifying Round	(Poland) Jagiellonia Białystok	2–2	2–1
2010–11	Aris	Play-off Round	Austria Wien	1–0	1–1
2010–11	Aris	Group Stage (Group B)	(Spain) Atlético Madrid	1–0	3–2
2010–11	Aris	Group Stage (Group B)	(Germany) Bayer Leverkusen	0–0	0–1
2010–11	Aris	Group Stage (Group B)	(Norway) Rosenborg	2–0	1–2
2010–11	Aris	Round of 32	(England) Manchester City	0–0	0–3
2010–11	PAOK (CL-Q)	Play-off Round	(Turkey) Fenerbahçe	1–0	1–1 (a.e.t.)
2010–11	PAOK (CL-Q)	Group Stage (Group D)	(Spain) Villarreal	1–0	0–1
2010–11	PAOK (CL-Q)	Group Stage (Group D)	(Belgium) Club Brugge	1–1	1–1
2010–11	PAOK (CL-Q)	Group Stage (Group D)	(Croatia) Dinamo Zagreb	1–0	1–0
2010–11	PAOK (CL-Q)	Round of 32	(Russia) CSKA Moscow	0–1	1–1
2011–12	Olympiacos Volos	2nd Qualifying Round	(Serbia) Rad	1–1	1–0
2011–12	Olympiacos Volos	3rd Qualifying Round	(Luxembourg) Differdange 03	3–0	3–0
2011–12	Olympiacos Volos	Play-off Round ^{14}	(France) Paris Saint-Germain		
2011–12	Panathinaikos (CL-Q)	Play-off Round	(Israel) Maccabi Tel Aviv	2–1	0–3
2011–12	AEK Athens (CW)	Play-off Round	(Georgia (country)) Dinamo Tbilisi	1–0	1–1 (a.e.t.)
2011–12	AEK Athens (CW)	Group Stage (Group L)	(Belgium) Anderlecht	1–2	1–4
2011–12	AEK Athens (CW)	Group Stage (Group L)	(Russia) Lokomotiv Moscow	1–3	1–3
2011–12	AEK Athens (CW)	Group Stage (Group L)	(Austria) Sturm Graz	1–2	3–1
2011–12	PAOK	3rd Qualifying Round	(Norway) Vålerenga	3–0	2–0
2011–12	PAOK	Play-off Round	(Ukraine) Karpaty Lviv	2–0	1–1
2011–12	PAOK	Group Stage (Group A)	(England) Tottenham Hotspur	0–0	2–1
2011–12	PAOK	Group Stage (Group A)	(Russia) Rubin Kazan	1–1	2–2
2011–12	PAOK	Group Stage (Group A)	(Republic of Ireland) Shamrock Rovers	2–1	3–1
2011–12	PAOK	Round of 32	(Italy) Udinese	0–3	0–0
2011–12	Olympiacos (CL-G)	Round of 32	(Russia) Rubin Kazan	1–0	1–0
2011–12	Olympiacos (CL-G)	Round of 16	(Ukraine) Metalist Kharkiv	1–2 (a)	1–0
2012–13	Asteras Tripoli	2nd Qualifying Round	(Azerbaijan) Inter Baku	1–1 (4–2 p)	1–1
2012–13	Asteras Tripoli	3rd Qualifying Round	(Portugal) Marítimo	1–1	0–0 (a)
2012–13	PAOK	3rd Qualifying Round	(Israel) Bnei Yehuda	4–1	2–0
2012–13	PAOK	Play-off Round	(Austria) Rapid Wien	2–1	0–3
2012–13	Atromitos	Play-off Round	(England) Newcastle United	1–1	0–1
2012–13	Panathinaikos (CL-Q)	Group Stage (Group J)	(England) Tottenham Hotspur	1–1	1–3
2012–13	Panathinaikos (CL-Q)	Group Stage (Group J)	(Italy) Lazio	1–1	0–3
2012–13	Panathinaikos (CL-Q)	Group Stage (Group J)	(Slovenia) Maribor	1–0	0–3
2012–13	Olympiacos (CL-G)	Round of 32	(Spain) Levante	0–1	0–3
2013–14	Skoda Xanthi	2nd Qualifying Round	(Northern Ireland) Linfield	0–1	2–1 (a.e.t.) (a)
2013–14	Skoda Xanthi	3rd Qualifying Round	(Belgium) Standard Liège	1–2	1–2
2013–14	Asteras Tripoli	3rd Qualifying Round	(Austria) Rapid Wien	1–1	1–3
2013–14	Atromitos	Play-off Round	(Netherlands) AZ Alkmaar	1–3	2–0 (a)
2013–14	PAOK (CL-Q)	Group Stage (Group L)	(Netherlands) AZ Alkmaar	2–2	1–1
2013–14	PAOK (CL-Q)	Group Stage (Group L)	(Israel) Maccabi Haifa	3–2	0–0
2013–14	PAOK (CL-Q)	Group Stage (Group L)	(Kazakhstan) Shakhter Karagandy	2–1	2–0
2013–14	PAOK (CL-Q)	Round of 32	(Portugal) Benfica	0–1	0–3
2014–15	Atromitos	3rd Qualifying Round	(Bosnia and Herzegovina) Sarajevo	1–3 (a.e.t.)	2–1
2014–15	Asteras Tripoli	2nd Qualifying Round	(Finland) RoPS	4–2	1–1
2014–15	Asteras Tripoli	3rd Qualifying Round	(Germany) Mainz 05	3–1	0–1
2014–15	Asteras Tripoli	Play-off Round	(Israel) Maccabi Tel Aviv	2–0	1–3 (a)
2014–15	Asteras Tripoli	Group Stage (Group C)	(England) Tottenham Hotspur	1–2	1–5
2014–15	Asteras Tripoli	Group Stage (Group C)	(Turkey) Beşiktaş	2–2	1–1
2014–15	Asteras Tripoli	Group Stage (Group C)	(Serbia) Partizan	2–0	0–0
2014–15	Panathinaikos (CL-Q)	Play-off Round	(Denmark) Midtjylland	4–1	2–1
2014–15	Panathinaikos (CL-Q)	Group Stage (Group E)	(Netherlands) PSV Eindhoven	2–3	1–1
2014–15	Panathinaikos (CL-Q)	Group Stage (Group E)	(Portugal) Estoril	1–1	0–2
2014–15	Panathinaikos (CL-Q)	Group Stage (Group E)	(Russia) Dynamo Moscow	1–2	1–2
2014–15	PAOK	Play-off Round	(Moldova) Zimbru Chișinău	4–0	0–1
2014–15	PAOK	Group Stage (Group K)	(Italy) Fiorentina	0–1	1–1
2014–15	PAOK	Group Stage (Group K)	(France) Guingamp	1–2	0–2
2014–15	PAOK	Group Stage (Group K)	(Belarus) Dinamo Minsk	6–1	2–0
2014–15	Olympiacos (CL-G)	Round of 32	(Ukraine) Dnipro	2–2	0–2
2015–16	Atromitos	3rd Qualifying Round	(Sweden) AIK	1–0	3–1
2015–16	Atromitos	Play-off Round	(Turkey) Fenerbahçe	0–1	0–3
2015–16	Panathinaikos (CL-Q)	Play-off Round	(Azerbaijan) Gabala	2–2 (a)	0–0
2015–16	PAOK	2nd Qualifying Round	(Croatia) Lokomotiva Zagreb	6–0	1–2
2015–16	PAOK	3rd Qualifying Round	(Slovakia) Spartak Trnava	1–0	1–1
2015–16	PAOK	Play-off Round	(Denmark) Brøndby	5–0	1–1
2015–16	PAOK	Group Stage (Group C)	(Germany) Borussia Dortmund	1–1	1–0
2015–16	PAOK	Group Stage (Group C)	(Russia) Krasnodar	0–0	1–2
2015–16	PAOK	Group Stage (Group C)	(Azerbaijan) Gabala	0–0	0–0
2015–16	Asteras Tripoli	Group Stage (Group K)	(Germany) Schalke 04	0–4	0–4
2015–16	Asteras Tripoli	Group Stage (Group K)	(Cyprus) APOEL	2–0	1–2
2015–16	Asteras Tripoli	Group Stage (Group K)	(Czech Republic) Sparta Prague	1–1	0–1
2015–16	Olympiacos (CL-G)	Round of 32	(Belgium) Anderlecht	1–2 (a.e.t.)	0–1
2016–17	PAS Giannina	2nd Qualifying Round	(Norway) Odd	3–0	1–3 (a.e.t.)
2016–17	PAS Giannina	3rd Qualifying Round	(Netherlands) AZ Alkmaar	1–2	0–1
2016–17	AEK Athens	3rd Qualifying Round	(France) Saint-Étienne	0–1	0–0
2016–17	Panathinaikos	3rd Qualifying Round	(Sweden) AIK	1–0	2–0
2016–17	Panathinaikos	Play-off Round	(Denmark) Brøndby	3–0	1–1
2016–17	Panathinaikos	Group Stage (Group G)	(Netherlands) Ajax	1–2	0–2
2016–17	Panathinaikos	Group Stage (Group G)	(Belgium) Standard Liège	0–3	2–2
2016–17	Panathinaikos	Group Stage (Group G)	(Spain) Celta Vigo	0–2	0–2
2016–17	PAOK (CL-Q)	Play-off Round	(Georgia (country)) Dinamo Tbilisi	2–0	3–0
2016–17	PAOK (CL-Q)	Group Stage (Group J)	(Italy) Fiorentina	0–0	3–2
2016–17	PAOK (CL-Q)	Group Stage (Group J)	(Czech Republic) Slovan Liberec	2–0	2–1
2016–17	PAOK (CL-Q)	Group Stage (Group J)	(Azerbaijan) Qarabağ	0–1	0–2
2016–17	PAOK (CL-Q)	Round of 32	(Germany) Schalke 04	0–3	1–1
2016–17	Olympiacos (CL-Q)	Play-off Round	(Portugal) Arouca	2–1 (a.e.t.)	1–0
2016–17	Olympiacos (CL-Q)	Group Stage (Group B)	(Cyprus) APOEL	0–1	0–2
2016–17	Olympiacos (CL-Q)	Group Stage (Group B)	(Switzerland) Young Boys	1–1	1–0
2016–17	Olympiacos (CL-Q)	Group Stage (Group B)	(Kazakhstan) Astana	4–1	1–1
2016–17	Olympiacos (CL-Q)	Round of 32	(Turkey) Osmanlıspor	0–0	3–0
2016–17	Olympiacos (CL-Q)	Round of 16	(Turkey) Beşiktaş	1–1	1–4
2017–18	Panionios	2nd Qualifying Round	(Slovenia) Gorica	2–0	3–2
2017–18	Panionios	3rd Qualifying Round	(Israel) Maccabi Tel Aviv	0–1	0–1
2017–18	Panathinaikos	3rd Qualifying Round	(Azerbaijan) Gabala	1–0	2–1
2017–18	Panathinaikos	Play-off Round	(Spain) Athletic Bilbao	2–3	0–1
2017–18	PAOK	3rd Qualifying Round	(Ukraine) Olimpik Donetsk	2–0	1–1
2017–18	PAOK	Play-off Round	(Sweden) Östersund	3–1	0–2 (a)
2017–18	AEK Athens (CL-Q)	Play-off Round	(Belgium) Club Brugge	3–0	0–0
2017–18	AEK Athens (CL-Q)	Group Stage (Group D)	(Italy) Milan	0–0	0–0
2017–18	AEK Athens (CL-Q)	Group Stage (Group D)	Austria Wien	2–2	0–0
2017–18	AEK Athens (CL-Q)	Group Stage (Group D)	(Croatia) Rijeka	2–2	2–1
2017–18	AEK Athens (CL-Q)	Round of 32	(Ukraine) Dynamo Kyiv	1–1	0–0 (a)
2018–19	Asteras Tripoli	2nd Qualifying Round	(Scotland) Hibernian	1–1	2–3
2018–19	Atromitos	2nd Qualifying Round	(Belarus) Dynamo Brest	1–1	3–4
2018–19	PAOK (CL-Q)	Group Stage (Group L)	(England) Chelsea	0−1	0−4
2018–19	PAOK (CL-Q)	Group Stage (Group L)	(Belarus) BATE Borisov	1−3	4−1
2018–19	PAOK (CL-Q)	Group Stage (Group L)	(Hungary) MOL Vidi	0−2	0−1
2018–19	Olympiacos	3rd Qualifying Round	(Switzerland) Luzern	4−0	3−1
2018–19	Olympiacos	Play-off Round	(England) Burnley	3−1	1−1
2018–19	Olympiacos	Group Stage (Group F)	(Italy) Milan	3−1	1−3
2018–19	Olympiacos	Group Stage (Group F)	(Spain) Real Betis	0−0	0−1
2018–19	Olympiacos	Group Stage (Group F)	(Luxembourg) F91 Dudelange	5−1	2−0
2018–19	Olympiacos	Round of 32	(Ukraine) Dynamo Kyiv	2−2	0−1
2019–20	Aris	2nd Qualifying Round	(Cyprus) AEL Limassol	0–0	1−0
2019–20	Aris	3rd Qualifying Round	(Norway) Molde	3–1 (a.e.t.)	0–3
2019–20	Atromitos	2nd Qualifying Round	(Slovakia) DAC Dunajská Streda	3−2	2–1
2019–20	Atromitos	3rd Qualifying Round	(Poland) Legia Warsaw	0–2	0–0
2019–20	AEK Athens	3rd Qualifying Round	(Romania) Universitatea Craiova	1–1	2–0
2019–20	AEK Athens	Play-off Round	(Turkey) Trabzonspor	1–3	2–0 (a)
2019–20	PAOK (CL-Q)	Play-off Round	(Slovakia) Slovan Bratislava	3–2 (a)	0–1
2019–20	Olympiacos (CL-G)	Round of 32	(England) Arsenal	0–1	2–1 (a.e.t.) (a)
2019–20	Olympiacos (CL-G)	Round of 16	(England) Wolverhampton Wanderers	1–1	0–1
2020–21	Aris	2nd Qualifying Round	(Ukraine) Kolos Kovalivka	1–2	
2020–21	OFI	2nd Qualifying Round	(Cyprus) Apollon Limassol	0–1	
2020–21	AEK Athens	3rd Qualifying Round	(Switzerland) St. Gallen		1–0
2020–21	AEK Athens	Play-off Round	(Germany) VfL Wolfsburg	2–1	
2020–21	AEK Athens	Group Stage (Group G)	(Portugal) Braga	2–4	0−3
2020–21	AEK Athens	Group Stage (Group G)	(England) Leicester City	1−2	0−2
2020–21	AEK Athens	Group Stage (Group G)	(Ukraine) Zorya Luhansk	0–3	4−1
2020–21	PAOK (CL-Q)	Group Stage (Group E)	(Netherlands) PSV Eindhoven	4−1	2–3
2020–21	PAOK (CL-Q)	Group Stage (Group E)	(Spain) Granada	0−0	0−0
2020–21	PAOK (CL-Q)	Group Stage (Group E)	(Cyprus) Omonia Nicosia	1−1	1–2
2020–21	Olympiacos (CL-G)	Round of 32	(Netherlands) PSV Eindhoven	4−2	1−2
2020–21	Olympiacos (CL-G)	Round of 16	(England) Arsenal	1−3	1−0
2021–22	Olympiacos (CL-Q)	Play-off Round	(Slovakia) Slovan Bratislava	3–0	2–2
2021–22	Olympiacos (CL-Q)	Group Stage (Group D)	(Germany) Eintracht Frankfurt	1–2	1–3
2021–22	Olympiacos (CL-Q)	Group Stage (Group D)	(Turkey) Fenerbahçe	1–0	3–0
2021–22	Olympiacos (CL-Q)	Group Stage (Group D)	(Belgium) Antwerp	2–1	0–1
2021–22	Olympiacos (CL-Q)	Knockout play-offs	(Italy) Atalanta	0–3	1–2
2022–23	Olympiacos (CL-Q)	3rd Qualifying Round	(Slovakia) Slovan Bratislava	1–1	2–2 (4–3 p)
2022–23	Olympiacos (CL-Q)	Play-off Round	(Cyprus) Apollon Limassol	1–1 (3–1 p)	1–1
2022–23	Olympiacos (CL-Q)	Group Stage (Group G)	(Azerbaijan) Qarabağ	0–3	0–0
2022–23	Olympiacos (CL-Q)	Group Stage (Group G)	(Germany) SC Freiburg	0–3	1–1
2022–23	Olympiacos (CL-Q)	Group Stage (Group G)	(France) Nantes	0–2	1–2
2023–24	Olympiacos	3rd Qualifying Round	(Belgium) Genk	1–0	1–1
2023–24	Olympiacos	Play-off Round	(Serbia) Čukarički	3–1	3–0
2023–24	Olympiacos	Group Stage (Group A)	(England) West Ham United	2–1	0–1
2023–24	Olympiacos	Group Stage (Group A)	(Germany) SC Freiburg	2–3	0–5
2023–24	Olympiacos	Group Stage (Group A)	(Serbia) TSC	5−2	2–2
2023–24	AEK Athens (CL-Q)	Group Stage (Group Β)	(Netherlands) Ajax	1–1	1−3
2023–24	AEK Athens (CL-Q)	Group Stage (Group Β)	(France) Marseille	0–2	1–3
2023–24	AEK Athens (CL-Q)	Group Stage (Group Β)	(England) Brighton & Hove Albion	0–1	3–2
2023–24	Panathinaikos (CL-Q)	Group Stage (Group F)	(Spain) Villarreal	2–0	2–3
2023–24	Panathinaikos (CL-Q)	Group Stage (Group F)	(France) Rennes	1–2	1–3
2023–24	Panathinaikos (CL-Q)	Group Stage (Group F)	(Israel) Maccabi Haifa	1–2	0–0
2024–25	Panathinaikos	2nd Qualifying Round	(Bulgaria) Botev Plovdiv	2–1	4–0
2024–25	Panathinaikos	3rd Qualifying Round	(Netherlands) Ajax	0–1	1–0 (12–13 p)
2024–25	PAOK (CL-Q)	Play-off Round	(Republic of Ireland) Shamrock Rovers	4–0	2–0
2024–25	PAOK (CL-Q)	League Phase (22nd place)	(Czech Republic) Slavia Prague	2–0	
2024–25	PAOK (CL-Q)	League Phase (22nd place)	(England) Manchester United		0–2
2024–25	PAOK (CL-Q)	League Phase (22nd place)	(Hungary) Ferencváros	5–0	
2024–25	PAOK (CL-Q)	League Phase (22nd place)	(Spain) Real Sociedad		0–2
2024–25	PAOK (CL-Q)	League Phase (22nd place)	(Czech Republic) Viktoria Plzeň	2–2	
2024–25	PAOK (CL-Q)	League Phase (22nd place)	(Turkey) Galatasaray		1–3
2024–25	PAOK (CL-Q)	League Phase (22nd place)	(Romania) FCSB	0–1	
2024–25	PAOK (CL-Q)	League Phase (22nd place)	(Latvia) RFS		2–0
2024–25	PAOK (CL-Q)	Knockout play-offs	(Romania) FCSB	1–2	0–2
2024–25	Olympiacos	League Phase (7th place)	(Scotland) Rangers	1–1	
2024–25	Olympiacos	League Phase (7th place)	(Portugal) Porto		1–0
2024–25	Olympiacos	League Phase (7th place)	(Portugal) Braga	3–0	
2024–25	Olympiacos	League Phase (7th place)	(France) Lyon		0–2
2024–25	Olympiacos	League Phase (7th place)	(Azerbaijan) Qarabağ	3–0	
2024–25	Olympiacos	League Phase (7th place)	(Sweden) Malmö FF		1–0
2024–25	Olympiacos	League Phase (7th place)	(Netherlands) Twente	0–0	
2024–25	Olympiacos	League Phase (7th place)	(Romania) FCSB		0–0
2024–25	Olympiacos	Round of 16	(Norway) Bodø/Glimt	2–1	0–3
2025–26	PAOK	3rd Qualifying Round	(Austria) Wolfsberg	0–0	1–0 (a.e.t.)
2025–26	PAOK	Play-off Round	(Croatia) Rijeka	5–0	0–1
2025–26	PAOK	League Phase (17th place)	(Spain) Real Betis	2–0	
2025–26	PAOK	League Phase (17th place)	(France) Lille		4–3
2025–26	PAOK	League Phase (17th place)	(Israel) Maccabi Tel Aviv	0–0	
2025–26	PAOK	League Phase (17th place)	(France) Lyon		2–4
2025–26	PAOK	League Phase (17th place)	(Switzerland) Young Boys	4–0	
2025–26	PAOK	League Phase (17th place)	(Bulgaria) Ludogorets Razgrad		3–3
2025–26	PAOK	League Phase (17th place)	(Norway) Brann	1–1	
2025–26	PAOK	League Phase (17th place)	(Spain) Celta Vigo		1–3
2025–26	PAOK	Knockout play-offs	(Spain) Celta Vigo	1–2	0–1
2025–26	Panathinaikos (CL-Q)	3rd Qualifying Round	(Ukraine) Shakhtar Donetsk	0–0	0–0 (4–3 p)
2025–26	Panathinaikos (CL-Q)	Play-off Round	(Turkey) Samsunspor	2–1	0–0
2025–26	Panathinaikos (CL-Q)	League Phase (20th place)	(Italy) Roma	1–1	
2025–26	Panathinaikos (CL-Q)	League Phase (20th place)	(Netherlands) Feyenoord		1–3
2025–26	Panathinaikos (CL-Q)	League Phase (20th place)	(Czech Republic) Viktoria Plzeň	0–0	
2025–26	Panathinaikos (CL-Q)	League Phase (20th place)	(Hungary) Ferencváros		1–1
2025–26	Panathinaikos (CL-Q)	League Phase (20th place)	(Austria) Sturm Graz	2–1	
2025–26	Panathinaikos (CL-Q)	League Phase (20th place)	(Switzerland) Young Boys		4–1
2025–26	Panathinaikos (CL-Q)	League Phase (20th place)	(Netherlands) Go Ahead Eagles	1–2	
2025–26	Panathinaikos (CL-Q)	League Phase (20th place)	(Sweden) Malmö FF		1–0
2025–26	Panathinaikos (CL-Q)	Knockout play-offs	(Czech Republic) Viktoria Plzeň	2–2	1–1 (4–3 p)
2025–26	Panathinaikos (CL-Q)	Round of 16	(Spain) Real Betis	1–0	0–4
2026–27	PAOK	2nd Qualifying Round	(Ukraine) Dynamo Kyiv	3–2	2–0
2026–27	PAOK	3rd Qualifying Round	(Belgium) Anderlecht	0–1	2–3
2026–27	OFI	Play-off Round	(Bulgaria) CSKA Sofia	3–0	2–0
2026–27	OFI	League Phase (16th place)	(Germany) Hoffenheim	2–0	
2026–27	OFI	League Phase (16th place)	(France) Rennes		1–2
2026–27	OFI	League Phase (16th place)	(Germany) Bayer Leverkusen	0–2	
2026–27	OFI	League Phase (16th place)	(Israel) Hapoel B'eer Sheva		2–0
2026–27	OFI	League Phase (16th place)	(Belgium) Anderlecht		
2026–27	OFI	League Phase (16th place)	(Portugal) Benfica		
2026–27	OFI	League Phase (16th place)	(Austria) Sturm Graz		
2026–27	OFI	League Phase (16th place)	(Poland) Lech Poznań		
2026–27	Olympiacos (CL-Q)	League Phase (6th place)	(Poland) Jagiellonia	2–1	
2026–27	Olympiacos (CL-Q)	League Phase (6th place)	(France) Marseille		1–0
2026–27	Olympiacos (CL-Q)	League Phase (6th place)	(Czech Republic) Sparta Prague	1–0	
2026–27	Olympiacos (CL-Q)	League Phase (6th place)	(France) Rennes		0–0
2026–27	Olympiacos (CL-Q)	League Phase (6th place)	(Italy) Milan		
2026–27	Olympiacos (CL-Q)	League Phase (6th place)	(Slovenia) Celje		
2026–27	Olympiacos (CL-Q)	League Phase (6th place)	(Germany) Hoffenheim		
2026–27	Olympiacos (CL-Q)	League Phase (6th place)	(Portugal) Torreense		

== UEFA Conference League ==
Season	Club	Round	Opponent	Home	Away
UEFA Europa Conference League
2021–22	AEK Athens	2nd Qualifying Round	(Bosnia and Herzegovina) Velež Mostar	1–0 (2–3 p)	1–2
2021–22	Aris	2nd Qualifying Round	(Kazakhstan) Astana	2–1 (a.e.t.)	0–2
2021–22	PAOK (CW)	3rd Qualifying Round	(Republic of Ireland) Bohemians	2–0	1–2
2021–22	PAOK (CW)	Play-off Round	(Croatia) Rijeka	1–1	2–0
2021–22	PAOK (CW)	Group Stage (Group F)	(Denmark) Copenhagen	1–2	2–1
2021–22	PAOK (CW)	Group Stage (Group F)	(Slovakia) Slovan Bratislava	1–1	0–0
2021–22	PAOK (CW)	Group Stage (Group F)	(Gibraltar) Lincoln Red Imps	2–0	2–0
2021–22	PAOK (CW)	Knockout play-offs	(Denmark) Midtjylland	2–1 (5–3 p)	0–1
2021–22	PAOK (CW)	Round of 16	(Belgium) Gent	1–0	2–1
2021–22	PAOK (CW)	Quarter-finals	(France) Marseille	0–1	1–2
2022–23	PAOK	2nd Qualifying Round	(Bulgaria) Levski Sofia	1–1	0–2
2022–23	Aris	2nd Qualifying Round	(Belarus) Gomel	5–1	2–1
2022–23	Aris	3rd Qualifying Round	(Israel) Maccabi Tel Aviv	2–1	0–2
2022–23	Panathinaikos (CW)	3rd Qualifying Round	(Czech Republic) Slavia Prague	1–1	0–2
2023–24	Aris	2nd Qualifying Round	Ararat-Armenia	1–0	1–1
2023–24	Aris	3rd Qualifying Round	(Ukraine) Dynamo Kyiv	1–0	1–2 (5–6 p)
2023–24	PAOK	2nd Qualifying Round	(Israel) Beitar Jerusalem	0–0	4–1
2023–24	PAOK	3rd Qualifying Round	(Croatia) Hajduk Split	3–0	0–0
2023–24	PAOK	Play-off Round	(Scotland) Hearts	4–0	2–1
2023–24	PAOK	Group stage (Group G)	(Germany) Eintracht Frankfurt	2–1	2–1
2023–24	PAOK	Group stage (Group G)	(Finland) HJK Helsinki	4–2	3–2
2023–24	PAOK	Group stage (Group G)	(Scotland) Aberdeen	2–2	3–2
2023–24	PAOK	Round of 16	(Croatia) Dinamo Zagreb	5–1	0–2
2023–24	PAOK	Quarter-finals	(Belgium) Club Brugge	0–2	0–1
2023–24	UEFA Europa Conference League Olympiacos (EL-G)	Knockout play-offs	(Hungary) Ferencváros	1–0	1–0
2023–24	UEFA Europa Conference League Olympiacos (EL-G)	Round of 16	(Israel) Maccabi Tel Aviv	1–4	6–1 (a.e.t.)
2023–24	UEFA Europa Conference League Olympiacos (EL-G)	Quarter-finals	(Turkey) Fenerbahçe	3–2	0–1 (3–2 p)
2023–24	UEFA Europa Conference League Olympiacos (EL-G)	Semi-finals	(England) Aston Villa	2–0	4–2
2023–24	UEFA Europa Conference League Olympiacos (EL-G)	Final	(Italy) Fiorentina	1–0 (a.e.t.)	
UEFA Conference League
2024–25	AEK Athens	2nd Qualifying Round	(Andorra) Inter Club d'Escaldes	4–3	4–0
2024–25	AEK Athens	3rd Qualifying Round	(Armenia) Noah	1–0	1–3
2024–25	Panathinaikos (EL-Q)	Play-off Round	(France) Lens	2–0	1–2
2024–25	Panathinaikos (EL-Q)	League Phase (13th place)	(England) Chelsea	1–4	
2024–25	Panathinaikos (EL-Q)	League Phase (13th place)	(Sweden) Djurgården		1–2
2024–25	Panathinaikos (EL-Q)	League Phase (13th place)	(Finland) HJK Helsinki	1–0	
2024–25	Panathinaikos (EL-Q)	League Phase (13th place)	(Wales) The New Saints		2–0
2024–25	Panathinaikos (EL-Q)	League Phase (13th place)	(Bosnia and Herzegovina) Borac Banja Luka		1–1
2024–25	Panathinaikos (EL-Q)	League Phase (13th place)	(Belarus) Dinamo Minsk	4–0	
2024–25	Panathinaikos (EL-Q)	Knockout play-offs	(Iceland) Víkingur Reykjavík	2–0	1–2
2024–25	Panathinaikos (EL-Q)	Round of 16	(Italy) Fiorentina	3–2	1–3
2025–26	Aris	2nd Qualifying Round	(Azerbaijan) Araz-Naxçıvan	2–2	1–2
2025–26	AEK Athens	2nd Qualifying Round	(Israel) Hapoel Be'er Sheva	1–0	0–0
2025–26	AEK Athens	3rd Qualifying Round	(Cyprus) Aris Limassol	3–1 (a.e.t.)	2–2
2025–26	AEK Athens	Play-off Round	(Belgium) Anderlecht	2–0	1–1
2025–26	AEK Athens	League Phase (3rd place)	(Italy) Fiorentina		1–0
2025–26	AEK Athens	League Phase (3rd place)	(Republic of Ireland) Shamrock Rovers	1–1	
2025–26	AEK Athens	League Phase (3rd place)	(Slovenia) Celje		1–3
2025–26	AEK Athens	League Phase (3rd place)	(Scotland) Aberdeen	6–0	
2025–26	AEK Athens	League Phase (3rd place)	(Turkey) Samsunspor		2–1
2025–26	AEK Athens	League Phase (3rd place)	(Romania) Universitatea Craiova	3–2	
2025–26	AEK Athens	Round of 16	(Slovenia) Celje	0–2	4–0
2025–26	AEK Athens	Quarter-finals	(Spain) Rayo Vallecano	3–1	0–3
2026–27	Panathinaikos	2nd Qualifying Round	(Hungary) Paksi	2–2	2–1
2026–27	Panathinaikos	3rd Qualifying Round	(Bulgaria) CSKA 1948	1–1	2–1 (a.e.t.)
2026–27	Panathinaikos	Play-off Round	(Czech Republic) Hradec Králové	2–2	2–1 (a.e.t.)
2026–27	Panathinaikos	League Phase (2nd place)	(Bosnia and Herzegovina) Borac Banja Luka	2–1	
2026–27	Panathinaikos	League Phase (2nd place)	(Kazakhstan) Kairat		5–1
2026–27	Panathinaikos	League Phase (2nd place)	(Bulgaria) CSKA Sofia	2–1	
2026–27	Panathinaikos	League Phase (2nd place)	(Denmark) Nordsjælland		
2026–27	Panathinaikos	League Phase (2nd place)	(Germany) Freiburg		
2026–27	Panathinaikos	League Phase (2nd place)	(England) Brighton		

== Intertoto Cup / UEFA Intertoto Cup ==
Season	Club	Round	Opponent	Home	Away
Intertoto Cup
1964–65^{15}	Olympiacos / Panionios	Group Stage (Group C1)	(Socialist Federal Republic of Yugoslavia) Dinamo Zagreb	2–2^{17}	0–4^{16}
1964–65^{15}	Olympiacos / Panionios	Group Stage (Group C1)	(France) Toulouse	2–4^{16}	0–3 (w/o)^{16}
1964–65^{15}	Olympiacos / Panionios	Group Stage (Group C1)	(Sweden) Malmö FF	1–1^{17}	1–5^{17}
1993	Iraklis	Group Stage (Group 8)	(Germany) Dynamo Dresden	1–1	
1993	Iraklis	Group Stage (Group 8)	(Austria) Wiener SC		2–4
1993	Iraklis	Group Stage (Group 8)	(Switzerland) Aarau	0–1	
1993	Iraklis	Group Stage (Group 8)	(Israel) Beitar Jerusalem		2–1
1993	Korinthos	Group Stage (Group 2)	(Sweden) Trelleborg	0–3	
1993	Korinthos	Group Stage (Group 2)	(Denmark) Lyngby		0–2
1993	Korinthos	Group Stage (Group 2)	(Romania) Rapid București	2–8	
1993	Korinthos	Group Stage (Group 2)	(Germany) Saarbrücken		0–3
UEFA Intertoto Cup
1995	Iraklis	Group Stage (Group 12)	(Austria) Vorwärts Steyr		0–3
1995	Iraklis	Group Stage (Group 12)	(Bulgaria) Spartak Plovdiv	0–0	
1995	Iraklis	Group Stage (Group 12)	(Germany) Eintracht Frankfurt		1–5
1995	Iraklis	Group Stage (Group 12)	(Lithuania) Panerys Vilnius	3–1	
1995	OFI	Group Stage (Group 7)	(Cyprus) Nea Salamis Famagusta	2–1	
1995	OFI	Group Stage (Group 7)	(Germany) Bayer Leverkusen		0–1
1995	OFI	Group Stage (Group 7)	(Estonia) Tervis Pärnu	2–0	
1995	OFI	Group Stage (Group 7)	(Socialist Federal Republic of Yugoslavia) Budućnost Podgorica		4–3
1995	OFI	Round of 16	(Turkey) Bursaspor		1–2
1997	Iraklis	Group Stage (Group 12)	(Austria) Ried		1–3
1997	Iraklis	Group Stage (Group 12)	(Georgia (country)) Merani Tbilisi	0–0	
1997	Iraklis	Group Stage (Group 12)	(Russia) Torpedo Moscow		1–4
1997	Iraklis	Group Stage (Group 12)	(Malta) Floriana	1–0	
1997	Panachaiki	Group Stage (Group 5)	(Norway) Stabæk	1–1	
1997	Panachaiki	Group Stage (Group 5)	(Russia) Dynamo Moscow		1–2
1997	Panachaiki	Group Stage (Group 5)	(Faroe Islands) B36 Tórshavn	4–2	
1997	Panachaiki	Group Stage (Group 5)	(Belgium) Genk		2–4
1998	Iraklis	2nd Round	(Romania) Național București	3–1	0–3
2000	Kalamata	3rd Round	(Czech Republic) Chmel Blšany	0–3	0–5
2002	Egaleo	3rd Round	(England) Fulham	1–1	0–1
2003	Akratitos	2nd Round	(Finland) Allianssi	0–1	0–0
2003	Egaleo	3rd Round	(Slovenia) Koper	2–3	2–2
2005	Egaleo	3rd Round	(Lithuania) Žalgiris Vilnius	1–3	3–2
2006	AEL	3rd Round	(Turkey) Kayserispor	0–0	0–2
2007	OFI	3rd Round	(Kazakhstan) Tobol	0–1	0–1
2008	Panionios	2nd Round	(Serbia) OFK Beograd	3–1	0–1
2008	Panionios	3rd Round	(Italy) Napoli	0–1	0–1

^{1} Olympiacos withdrew for political reasons.

^{2}: Match played at Wembley Stadium, London

^{3}: The original game ended 2–1 for Panathinaikos and this led to a penalty shoot-out. While CSKA Sofia were leading by 3–2, the Soviet referee, Valentin Lipatov interrupted the shoot-out and declared the Bulgarian team as winners (although CSKA Sofia had shot 3 penalties no miss and Panathinaikos had shot 4 penalties 2 misses. Therefore, UEFA decided that the match should be replayed.

^{4}: The Ukrainian team Dynamo Kyiv, participant in the Champions League, were disqualified by UEFA after its first game in the league stage (Dinamo Kyiv 1–0 Panathinaikos, at the Olimpiyskyi Stadion, Kyiv on 13 September 1995), when the Spanish referee Antonio Jesús López Nieto reported a bribe attempt (including minks and female escort). To replace Dinamo Kyiv in the group stage, UEFA promoted its qualifying round rivals Aalborg.

^{5}: The first leg finished 2–1 to Maccabi Tel Aviv but UEFA awarded a 3–0 walkover to Maccabi Tel Aviv because PAOK fielded an ineligible suspended player (Liassos Louka).

^{6}: PAOK had lost to Metalist Kharkiv in the third qualifying round and Metalist Kharkiv were drawn against Schalke 04. However, they were excluded from the competition by UEFA for their involvement in a match-fixing scandal in the 2007–08 season. UEFA decided to replace them with PAOK in the play-off round.

^{7} Olympiacos withdrew

^{8} The away goal rule didn't exist at the time, so to break the tie a play-off game was played in Vienna, where Olympiacos won 2–0.

^{9} Iraklis got a bye.

^{10} The game was suspended after Cagliari's third goal because three Greek players refused to return to the pitch after they were expelled by the police. Later, UEFA validated the score of 3–0 as definitive.

^{11} Panionios were disqualified after the first leg due to fan riots.

^{12}: The original game was interrupted in the 88th minute, while the score was a 3–3 draw, due to a floodlight failure in the stadium, and UEFA established that it should be replayed from the beginning.

^{13}: The match was interrupted in the 51st minute, while Paris Saint-Germain were leading by 0–2, due to incidents in the stands. Paris Saint-Germain were later awarded a 0–3 walkover win by UEFA.

^{14}: Olympiacos Volos, reached the play-off round and were drawn against Paris Saint-Germain. However, they were excluded from the competition by UEFA on 11 August 2011 for their involvement in a match-fixing scandal. UEFA decided to replace them with Differdange from Luxembourg, which had lost to Olympiacos Volos in the third qualifying round, in the play-off round.

^{15}: Olympiacos withdrew after the first two matches and lost the away match to Toulouse with a walk over. Olympiacos received a heavy fine from UEFA, who obliged the Hellenic Football Federation to find another team to replace Olympiacos, otherwise all Greek clubs would be banned from next season's European competitions. Eventually, Panionios were the replacing team and played the three remaining matches of the group stage.

^{16}: Match played by Olympiacos.

^{17}: Match played by Panionios.

== UEFA Youth League ==
The UEFA Youth League is a European youth football competition, featuring the youth (U19) teams of clubs competing in the Champions League group stage, plus the domestic youth champions of the highest-ranked national associations. It started in the 2013–14 season and Olympiacos were crowned European champion for 2024. It thus became the first Greek team to win a European club football title.

Season	Club	Round	Opponent	Home	Away
2013–14	Olympiacos	Group stage (C)	(Portugal) Benfica	0–1	0–0
2013–14	Olympiacos	Group stage (C)	(France) Paris Saint-Germain	0–0	1–1
2013–14	Olympiacos	Group stage (C)	(Belgium) Anderlecht	0–0	2–4
2014–15	Olympiacos	Group stage (A)	(Spain) Atlético Madrid	1–2	2–0
2014–15	Olympiacos	Group stage (A)	(Italy) Juventus	1–1	3–0
2014–15	Olympiacos	Group stage (A)	(Sweden) Malmö FF	2–0	3–1
2014–15	Olympiacos	Round of 16	(Ukraine) Shakhtar Donetsk	1–1 (4–5 p)	X
2015–16	Olympiacos	Group stage (F)	(Croatia) Dinamo Zagreb	1–3	2–2
2015–16	Olympiacos	Group stage (F)	(England) Arsenal	2–0	2–3
2015–16	Olympiacos	Group stage (F)	(Germany) Bayern Munich	1–0	1–0
2016–17	PAOK	First Round	(Hungary) Puskás Akadémia	0–0	1–1
2016–17	PAOK	Second Round	(Netherlands) Ajax	0–2	1–2
2017–18	Olympiacos	Group stage (D)	(Spain) Barcelona	0–3	0–5
2017–18	Olympiacos	Group stage (D)	(Portugal) Sporting Lisbon	2–2	1–1
2017–18	Olympiacos	Group stage (D)	(Italy) Juventus	2–0	1–3
2018–19	AEK Athens	Group stage (E)	(Netherlands) Ajax	1–8	0–6
2018–19	AEK Athens	Group stage (E)	(Portugal) Benfica	1–3	0–3
2018–19	AEK Athens	Group stage (E)	(Germany) Bayern Munich	1–4	0–2
2018–19	PAOK	First Round	(Cyprus) AEL Limassol	2–0	2–1
2018–19	PAOK	Second Round	(Belarus) Minsk	2–1	1–0
2018–19	PAOK	Play-offs	(England) Tottenham Hotspur	0–1	X
2019–20	Olympiacos	Group Stage (B)	(Serbia) Red Star Belgrade	0–1	1–2
2019–20	Olympiacos	Group Stage (B)	(England) Tottenham Hotspur	1–1	0–1
2019–20	Olympiacos	Group Stage (B)	(Germany) Bayern Munich	0–4	0–6
2019–20	PAOK	First Round	(Republic of Ireland) Bohemians	1–0	1–1
2019–20	PAOK	Second Round	(Ukraine) Dynamo Kyiv	2–2	0–3
2020–21	Cancelled due to the COVID-19 pandemic in Europe				
2021–22	PAOK	First Round	(Slovakia) Žilina	1–5	0–2
2022–23	Panathinaikos	First Round	(Bulgaria) Slavia Sofia	8–0	2–2
2022–23	Panathinaikos	Second Round	(Slovakia) Trenčín	2–0	4–3
2022–23	Panathinaikos	Play-offs	(Portugal) Porto	0–1	X
2023–24	UEFA Youth League Olympiacos	First Round	(Italy) Lecce	3–1	3–1
2023–24	UEFA Youth League Olympiacos	Second Round	(Azerbaijan) Gabala	3–0	4–0
2023–24	UEFA Youth League Olympiacos	Play-offs	(Italy) Inter Milan	0–0 (6–5 p)	X
2023–24	UEFA Youth League Olympiacos	Round of 16	(France) Lens	2–2 (4–2 p)	X
2023–24	UEFA Youth League Olympiacos	Quarter-finals	(Germany) Bayern Munich	3–1	X
2023–24	UEFA Youth League Olympiacos	Semi-finals	(France) Nantes	0–0 (3–1 p)	X
2023–24	UEFA Youth League Olympiacos	Final	(Italy) Milan	3–0	
2024–25	Olympiacos	Second Round	(Estonia) Tallinna Kalev	5–0	2–1
2024–25	Olympiacos	Third Round	(Slovakia) Trenčín	4–1	1–1
2024–25	Olympiacos	Round of 32	(Spain) Girona	1–0	X
2024–25	Olympiacos	Round of 16	(Austria) Sturm Graz	X	1–1 (5–4 p)
2024–25	Olympiacos	Quarter-finals	(Austria) Red Bull Salzburg	X	0–1
2025–26	Olympiacos	League Phase	(Cyprus) Pafos	4–0	X
2025–26	Olympiacos	League Phase	(England) Arsenal	X	2–1
2025–26	Olympiacos	League Phase	(Spain) Barcelona	X	0–3
2025–26	Olympiacos	League Phase	(Netherlands) PSV Eindhoven	2–2	X
2025–26	Olympiacos	League Phase	(Spain) Real Madrid	0–2	X
2025–26	Olympiacos	League Phase	(Kazakhstan) Kairat	X	0–2
2025–26	PAOK	Second Round	(Finland) Akureyri	2–0	2–0
2025–26	PAOK	Third Round	(Poland) Legia Warsaw	1–2	1–2

== Top scorers by club ==
Rank	Player	Goals	Club
1	(Morocco) **Ayoub El Kaabi**	26	Olympiacos
1	(Greece) Demis Nikolaidis	26	AEK Athens
2	(Poland) Krzysztof Warzycha	25	Panathinaikos
4	(Greece) Stefanos Athanasiadis	20	PAOK

Bold = Still active
Italics = Active but not in UEFA

== Notes ==
- **^a** Olympiacos had withdrawn from 1958–59 European Cup competition
- **^b** Olympiacos had withdrawn from 1962–63 UEFA Cup Winner's Cup
- **^c** Olympiacos Volos were excluded from the competition by UEFA for their involvement in the match-fixing scandal
- **^d** In season 1963–64, Olympiacos had played a third play-off match
