= Football in Greece =

Popular sport in Greece

Association football in Greece
- Country: Greece
- Governing body: Hellenic Football Federation
- National teams: Men's; Women's
- First played: 1906; 120 years ago (Unofficial); 1927; 99 years ago (Official)
- Clubs: 2,187 (2026)

National competitions
- Greek Super Cup; Greek Cup; Greek Amateurs Cup; Women's Greek Cup

Club competitions
- Super League 1 Super League 2 Gamma Ethniki; F.C.A. Champion Teams Championship; F.C.A. Championships; Women's Alpha Ethniki

International competitions
- UEFA Champions League; UEFA Europa League; UEFA Conference League; UEFA Super Cup; UEFA Youth League; FIFA Club World Cup; FIFA Intercontinental Cup; FIFA Women's Club World Cup; UEFA Women's Champions League; UEFA Women's Europa Cup; FIFA World Cup (national team); UEFA European Championship (national team); UEFA Nations League (national team); FIFA Women's World Cup (national team); UEFA Women's Championship (national team); UEFA Women's Nations League (national team)

Audience records
- Single match: Olympiacos Piraeus vs. Hamburger SV; 3 November 1982; Athens Olympic Stadium; 75,263 spectators

Association football (Greek: ποδόσφαιρο, romanized: podósfairo) is the most popular sport in Greece, followed by basketball. Over half of the people in Greece are interested in football.

== History of Greek football ==
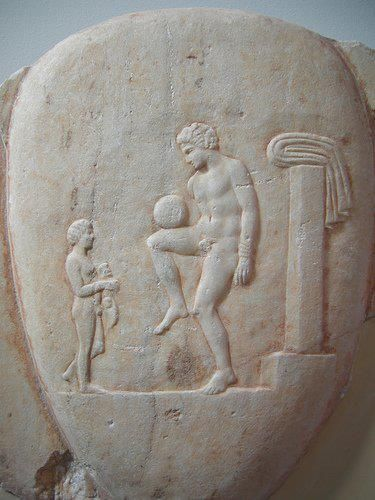
Ancient Greek Episkyros player balancing the ball. Depiction on an Attic Lekythos.

The Ancient Greeks are known to have played many ball games, some of which involved the use of the feet. The Roman game harpastum is believed to have been adapted from a Greek team game known as "ἐπίσκυρος" (Episkyros) or "φαινίνδα" (phaininda), which is mentioned by a Greek playwright, Antiphanes (388–311 B.C.) and later referred to by the Christian theologian Clement of Alexandria (c.150–c.215 A.D.). These games appear to have resembled rugby football.

In the modern era, however, association football was introduced to the Greeks by expatriate British communities and military personnel. The first Greek football teams were created as part of long-established athletic and gymnastic clubs in the major port cities of Athens and Thessaloniki, as well as among the large Greek communities of the Ottoman Empire, such as Constantinople and Smyrna, in the early 1900s. After the Asia Minor Disaster of 1922 which resulted in a large resettlement of Greeks from Turkey to Greece, several clubs, such as Panionios and Apollon Smyrnis, were transplanted, while many athletes of other clubs, like Pera, formed new organizations in their new home (e.g. AEK, PAOK).

== League system ==
The first league of professional football in Greece was officially established as the Panhellenic Championship in 1927. The league ran until 1959, when it was replaced by the Alpha Ethniki which ran until 2006 when it was then replaced by Super League Greece. According to FIFPRO, an organization that represents professional players, nearly 70 percent of players complained in a 2011 survey of problems with not being paid.

Superleague Greece is the top-flight professional football division within Greece. The league contains 14 clubs, with the winners of the league becoming the Champions of Greece. The team with the most national championships is Olympiacos, who have won 48 times - 14 Super League titles, 19 Alpha Ethniki titles and 15 Panhellenic Championships. Two other P.O.K. clubs also dominate the history of Greek football; Panathinaikos with 20 titles and AEK Athens with 14 titles.

== Cup competitions ==
There are currently two major cups competitions in Greek football, the Greek Cup, which includes clubs from the 2 professional leagues in Greece, Super League 1 and Super League 2 and the Greek Super Cup, an annual game held between the winner of the Greek Super League and Greek Cup.

== International ==
=== UEFA competitions ===
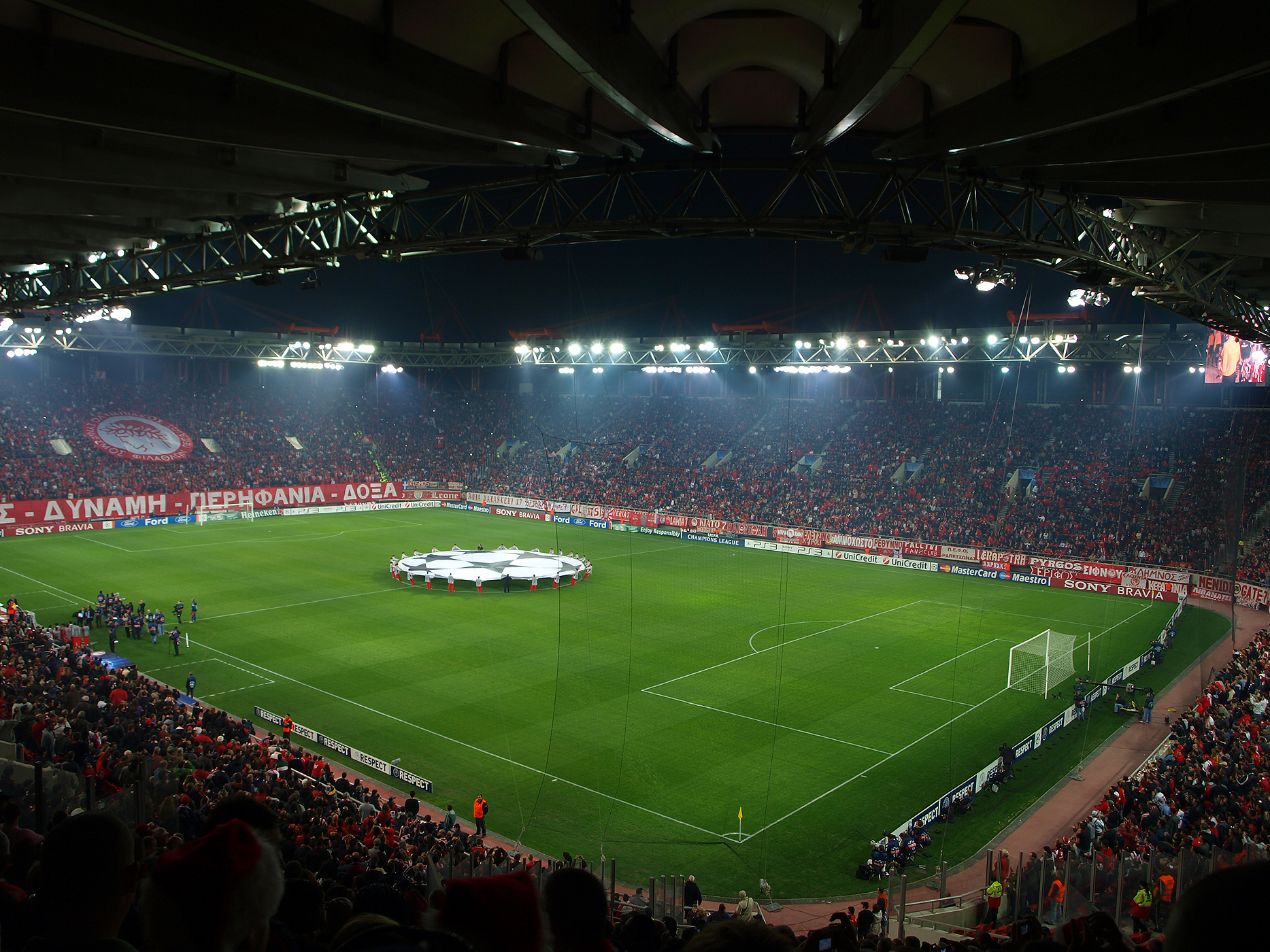
The Karaiskakis Stadium during a 2009–10 UEFA Champions League fixture against Arsenal.

Club sides may qualify to play in European tournaments under the jurisdiction of UEFA. The champions of Super League qualify for the group stage of the following season's UEFA Champions League. The teams finishing in second to fifth position qualify for a round-robin playoff, the winner of which will enter the Champions League at the Third Qualifying Round. The other three teams will qualify for the following season's UEFA Europa League, at the Play-off, Third Qualifying or Second Qualifying Round stage, dependent on their performance in the national level playoff. The winner of the Greek Cup also qualifies for the Europa League. If this club has already qualified for a UEFA competition then the place is given to the runners-up.

Olympiacos became the first and only Greek team to lift a UEFA trophy, winning the UEFA Conference League in the 2023–24 season, defeating Fiorentina in the final. Additionally, the Olympiacos youth team had won the UEFA Youth League in the same season, beating AC Milan in the final.

=== National team ===
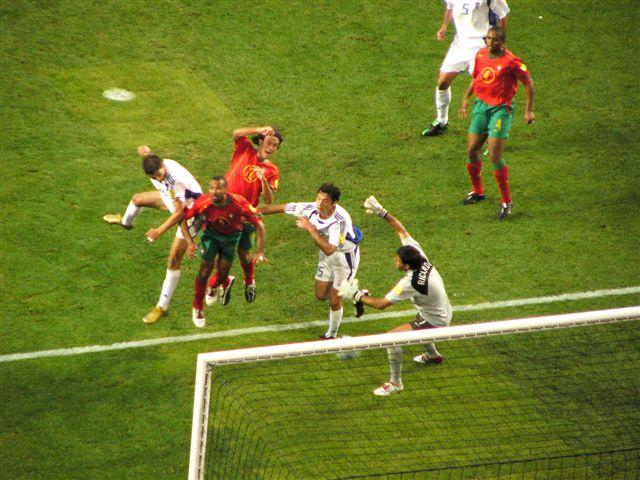
Angelos Charisteas scoring Greece's winning goal in the UEFA Euro 2004 final.

The Greek national team's first match came on April 7, 1929, in a 1–4 loss to Italy. Greece have qualified for the FIFA World Cup three times, in 1994, in 2010 and in 2014. Greece have qualified for the European Championship four times, their first in 1980, their second in 2004, their third in 2008 and their fourth in 2012. 2004 was their most successful run as they became champions by defeating hosts Portugal in the finals.

== Women's football ==
A national league for women has existed since 1989. Now known as the Women's Alpha Ethniki, it was started in 1989 as the Women's Panhellenic Championship. In recent years PAOK have dominated the league.

== Professional seasons in Greek football ==
1970s:	1979–80									
1980s:	1980–81	1981–82	1982–83	1983–84	1984–85	1985–86	1986–87	1987–88	1988–89	1989–90
1990s:	1990–91	1991–92	1992–93	1993–94	1994–95	1995–96	1996–97	1997–98	1998–99	1999–00
2000s:	2000–01	2001–02	2002–03	2003–04	2004–05	2005–06	2006–07	2007–08	2008–09	2009–10
2010s:	2010–11	2011–12	2012–13	2013–14	2014–15	2015–16	2016–17	2017–18	2018–19	2019–20
2020s:	2020–21	2021–22	2022–23	2023–24	2024–25	2025–26	2026–27			

== Attendances ==
The average attendance per top-flight football league season and the club with the highest average attendance:

Season	League average	Best club	Best club average
2024–25	6,412	Olympiacos	26,969
2023–24	5,365	AEK	21,343
2022–23	7,186	AEK	27,603
2021–22	—	—	—
2020–21	—	—	—
2019–20	6,408	Olympiacos	20,501
2018–19	5,416	Olympiacos	21,073
2017–18	3,906	Olympiacos	14,016
2016–17	3,932	Olympiacos	18,044
2015–16	4,039	Olympiacos	18,154
2014–15	3,141	Olympiacos	17,221
2013–14	3,966	Olympiacos	16,856
2012–13	4,900	Olympiacos	20,918
2011–12	5,064	Olympiacos	21,529
2010–11	6,308	Olympiacos	22,099
2009–10	7,510	Panathinaikos	27,531
2008–09	7,534	Olympiacos	25,368
2007–08	6,526	Olympiacos	24,196
2006–07	6,183	Olympiacos	22,412
2005–06	5,679	Olympiacos	21,270
2004–05	6,010	AEK	27,647
2003–04	2,892	Panathinaikos	8,857
2002–03	3,232	Panathinaikos	8,093
2001–02	5,642	Olympiacos	20,279
2000–01	3,626	Olympiacos	11,989
1999–2000	3,980	Olympiacos	14,335
1998–99	4,119	Olympiacos	11,092
1997–98	4,509	Olympiacos	16,237
1996–97	4,467	Olympiacos	16,935
1995–96	4,326	Panathinaikos	11,662
1994–95	4,128	Panathinaikos	11,709
1993–94	3,763	AEK	11,384
1992–93	4,921	Panathinaikos	16,215
1991–92	5,874	Olympiacos	18,388
1990–91	6,373	Olympiacos	18,363
1989–90	6,563	Panathinaikos	19,554
1988–89	9,462	Olympiacos	35,460
1987–88	11,256	Olympiacos	38,604
1986–87	9,102	Olympiacos	32,056
1985–86	14,103	Panathinaikos	45,000
1984–85	11,958	Panathinaikos	37,024
1983–84	10,235	Panathinaikos	22,417
1982–83	7,681	Olympiacos	23,508
1981–82	8,255	Olympiacos	22,046
1980–81	8,676	Olympiacos	24,759
1979–80	9,422	Olympiacos	24,791
1978–79	8,302	Olympiacos	24,552
1977–78	6,593	AEK	15,572
1976–77	10,338	Olympiacos	26,209
1975–76	9,732	Olympiacos	22,089
1974–75	9,135	Olympiacos	24,959
1973–74	9,586	Olympiacos	29,526
1972–73	10,869	Olympiacos	36,817
1971–72	10,558	Olympiacos	32,471
1970–71	10,098	Olympiacos	27,640
1969–70	9,172	Olympiacos	24,228
1968–69	8,441	Olympiacos	23,329
1967–68	7,756	Olympiacos	21,703
1966–67	8,367	Olympiacos	27,591
1965–66	7,542	Olympiacos	27,770
1964–65	8,630	Olympiacos	26,472
1963–64	7,084	Olympiacos	21,806
1962–63	7,575	Panathinaikos	19,160
1961–62	6,238	Panathinaikos	17,393
1960–61	5,698	Panathinaikos	15,998
1959–60	5,437	Panathinaikos	13,394

== See also ==
- List of football clubs in Greece
- List of football clubs in Greece by major honours won
- Greek football clubs in European competitions
- List of football stadiums in Greece
- Episkyros
- Sport in Greece
