= Symeonidis =

Symeonidis, sometimes spelled Symeonides (Greek: Συμεωνίδης) is a surname. It may refer to:

- Diomidis Symeonidis (1908–1981), Greek-Cypriot footballer
- Haralambos Symeonidis (born 1968), Greek Hispanist and linguist
- Leandros Symeonidis (born 1937), Greek footballer
- Nathanael Symeonides (born 1978), Greek Orthodox Metropolitan of Chicago
- Symeon C. Symeonides (born 1949), Greek-Cypriot law scholar

== See also ==
- Simeon
