= Panathinaikos A.O. =

Greek multi-sport club based in Athens

Panathinaikos
- Full name: Παναθηναϊκός Αθλητικός Όμιλος; Panathinaikós Athlitikós Ómilos (Panathenaic Athletic Club)
- Nicknames: Οι Πράσινοι (the Greens); To Τριφύλλι (the Trifolium/Trefoil); Σύλλογος Μεγάλος (The Great Club)
- Founded: 3 February 1908; 118 years ago as Podosferikos Omilos Athinon (Note: While POA was founded in 1908, the club that actually became Panathinaikos was founded in 1911. 1908 is the date that is on the club's crest and merchandise.)
- Based in: Athens, Greece
- Colours: Green, White
- Anthem: Syllogos Megalos (Great Club)
- Chairman: Dimitris Vranopoulos
- Club titles: Intercontinental Titles: 1 European Titles: 10; Balkan Titles: 1
- Website: pao1908.com

Panathinaikos Athlitikos Omilos (Greek: Παναθηναϊκός Αθλητικός Όμιλος, lit. 'Pan-Athenian Athletic Club') also known as Panathinaikos A.C., or simply as Panathinaikós [panˈaθinai̯ˈkos], is a major Greek multi-sport club based in the City of Athens. Panathinaikos is one of the most successful multi-sport clubs and one of the oldest clubs in Greece. The name "Panathinaikos" (which can literally be translated as "Panathenaic", which means "of all Athens") was inspired by the ancient work of Isocrates Panathenaicus, within which the orator praises the Athenians for their democratic education and their military superiority, wielded for the benefit of all Greeks.

A club by the name of POA was founded by Giorgos Kalafatis in 1908, when he and 40 other athletes decided to break away from Panellinios Gymnastikos Syllogos following the club's decision to discontinue its football team. Later, Kalafatis also broke away from POA and formed a separate team that was considered a branch of POA, until 1911, when it became officially separate and was named PPO (ΠΠΟ). It traditionally represents the Athenian aristocracy, and has a strong rivalry with Olympiacos SFP, which traditionally represents the working classes of Piraeus.

It is amongst the most popular clubs in the country and one of the biggest worldwide, based on the number of its sports departments. It is the club that introduced in Greece a number of sports, as it was the first, or amongst the first teams, in football, basketball, volleyball, field hockey, table tennis and handball, while they were also pioneer in the creation of women's teams in basketball and football.

Panathinaikos' teams and individual athletes have won numerous titles and have made notable participations in domestic and international competitions. The basketball team of the club is the most successful in Greece and one of the most successful in Europe, with seven European championships, one Intercontinental Cup and two Triple Crowns. The football team of Panathinaikos are the only Greek team that has reached the UEFA Champions League final (in 1971) and also the semi-finals twice (in 1985 and 1996). It is also the only Greek football team that has played for the Intercontinental Cup. The teams of Panathinaikos have played overall in 19 European and international finals (in football, basketball, men's volleyball, women's volleyball, men's table tennis and women's table tennis).

In the individual sports, Panathinaikos has a remarkable tradition in the athletics, cycling, shooting, fencing and boxing departments. It has produced numerous athletes; World champions and European champions, winners at the Olympic, Mediterranean and Balkan Games.

== History ==
=== 1908–1945 ===
==== Football Club of Athens ====
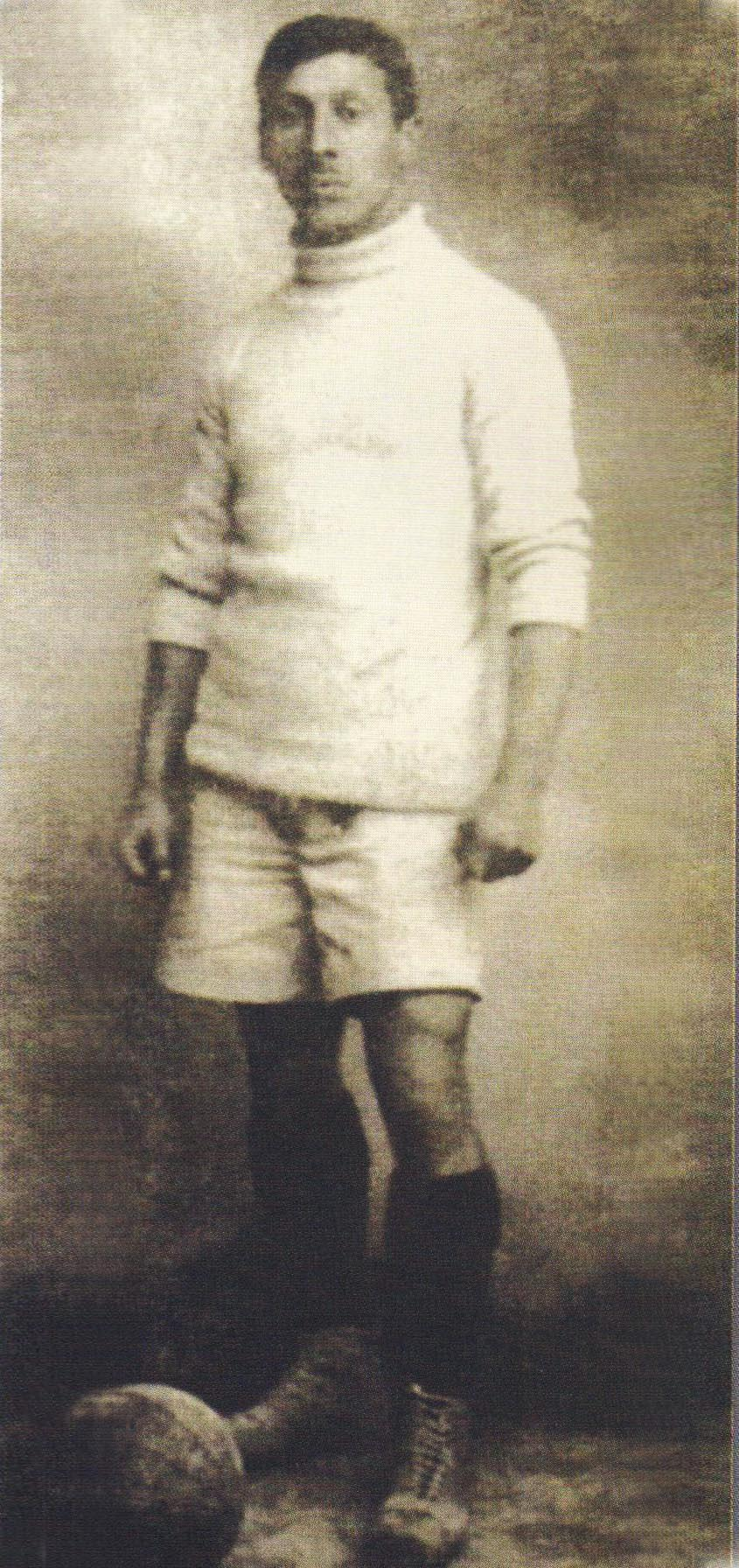
Giorgos Kalafatis, founder of the Club

Football made its appearance in Greece at the end of the 19th century. In 1908, a young athlete of Panellinios, Giorgos Kalafatis, dismayed by his club's decision to discontinue its football team, left with 40 other athletes and founded "Podosferikos Omilos Athinon" (Football Club of Athens). Konstantinos Tsiklitiras, the great Greek athlete of the early 20th century, played as goalkeeper for the new team.

==== Panathenaic Athletic Club ====
The team of Kalafatis eventually separated from POA and became Panellinios Podosferikos Omilos (PPO) – i.e. "Panhellenic Football Club" – in 1911. In 1918, it was decided that the official crest of the club would be the trifolium, symbol of unity, harmony, nature, and good luck, an idea of player Michalis Papazoglou. The officials of the club were looking for a universal, non-nationalistic or localistic symbol, aiming to represent the whole Athens at the country and further at the world.

Papazoglou was also the main instigator of the Panathenaic Idea, the idea for the creation of a new club -for the Greek standards- which will participate in as more sports as possible (something that would by adopted later by all the major Greek clubs). With the help of the others of the leading four of the club (Kalafatis, Panourgias and Nikolaidis), this came true. In 1919, Kalafatis was a member of the Greece national football team that participated in the Inter-Allied Games in Paris. There, he collected informations also about basketball and volleyball (sports unknown then in Greece) and after his return to Athens, started his efforts on creating new teams for the club.

In 1924, the club took its final and current name "Panathinaikos Athlitikos Omilos (PAO)" (Panathenaic Athletic Club), from now on a multi-sports club. During the next decades, with main contributor Apostolos Nikolaidis (considered Patriarch of the club), Panathinaikos not only will create teams almost in every sport, but they will be consecutive champions for many years in most of them.

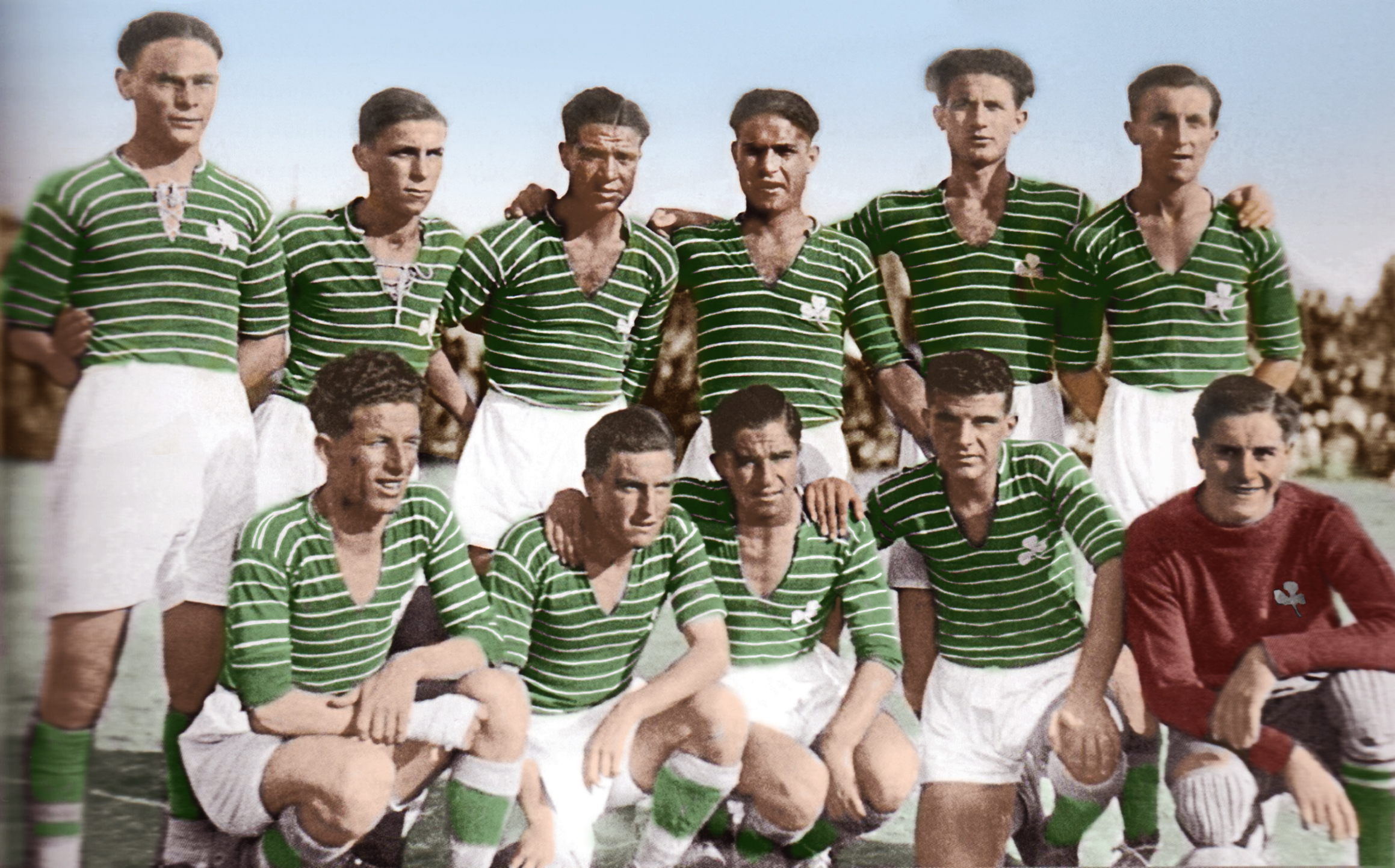
The champion football team of 1930

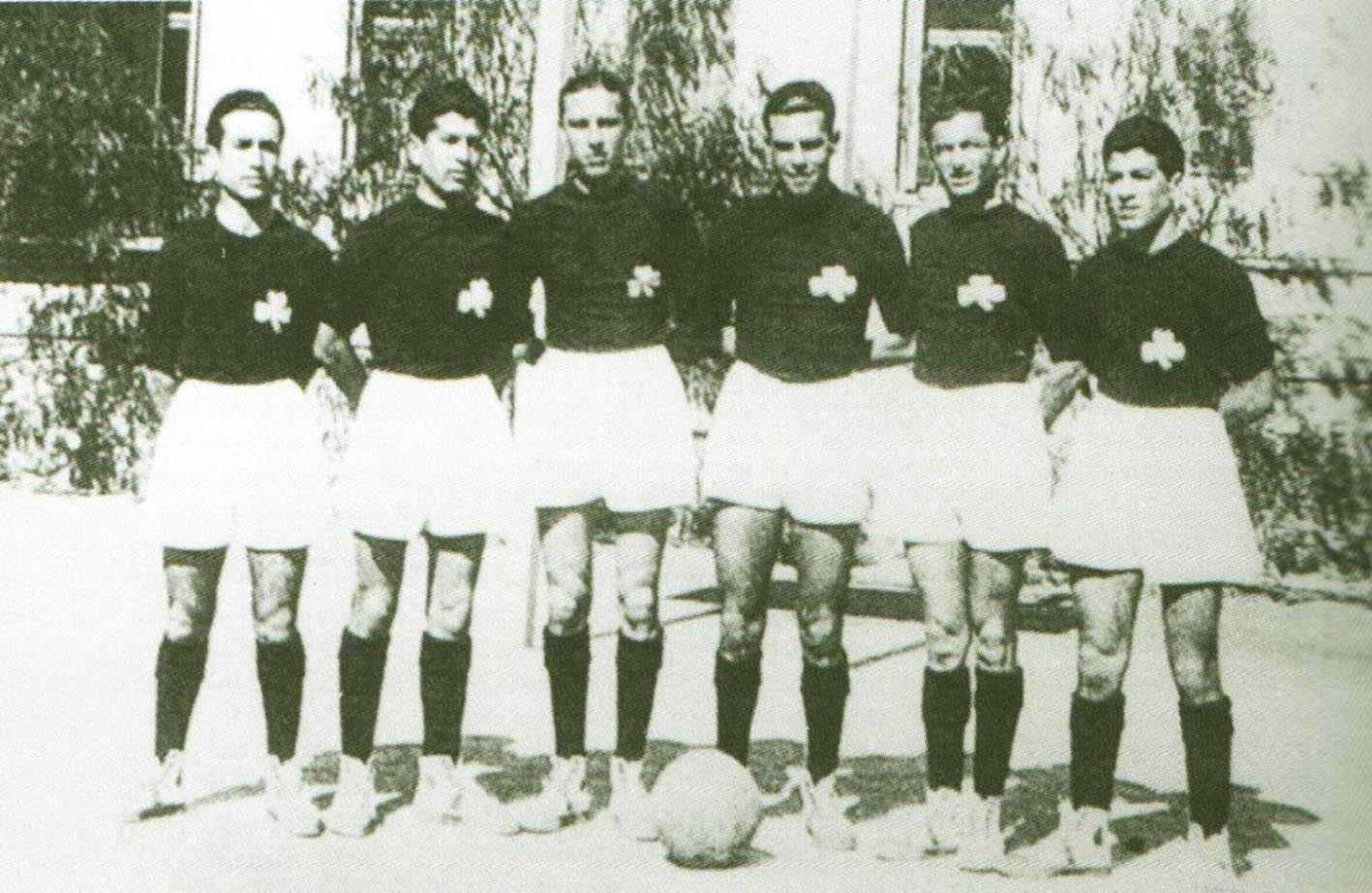
Basketball team of 1940

The athletics department was founded in 1919. In the same year, Panathinaikos was one of the first clubs in Greece to form a volleyball team. The first dynamic presence of the team is dated back in the years 1927–1929 with many popular players of the time such as the historical member of the board Apostolos Nikolaidis as well as Athanasios Aravositas, Goumas, Arg. Nikolaidis, Papageorgiou and Papastefanou.

In 1922, the basketball department was founded, also one of the first in Greece, and it has since developed into the most successful basketball team in the country and one of the most successful in Europe. In 1924, the table tennis department was founded, in 1926 the tennis department and in 1928 the cycling, shooting and field hockey departments. The swimming, water polo and handball departments were created in 1930.

In the 1928 Summer Olympics, for the first time, the parade of nations started with Greece. The athlete of Panathinaikos Antonis Kariofillis became the first Greek who started the parade.

Panathinaikos won the football championship in 1930 under the guidance of József Künsztler with Angelos Messaris as the team's star player. Other notable players of the era were Antonis Migiakis, Diomidis Symeonidis and Mimis Pierrakos. They beat rivals Olympiacos 8–2, a result that still remains the biggest win either team has achieved against its rival. In 1937 the women's basketball team was created, being the first in the country.

During World War II and the dark years of the Axis occupation of Greece, the athletes of Panathinaikos played a significant role. The football player Mimis Pierrakos was killed during the Greco-Italian war, while Michalis Papazoglou with Dimitris Giannatos (founding member of the basketball team) later participated in the resistance group of Jerzy Iwanow-Szajnowicz, an athlete of Polish origin of Iraklis Thessaloniki and secret agent of the British, and succeeded in destroying three German airplanes and sinking three small warships. They were arrested, tortured and finally Giannatos and Ivanof were executed.

=== 1946–1990 ===
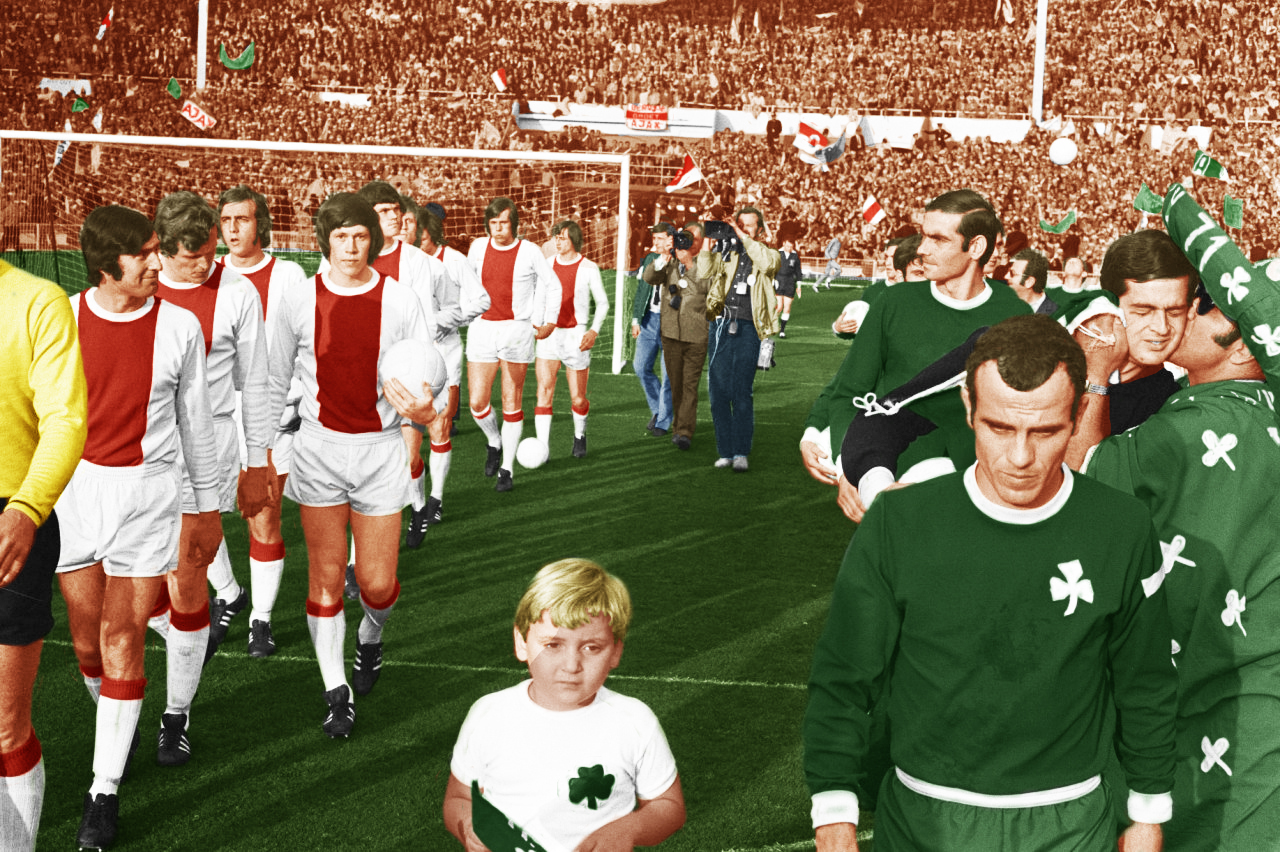
The football team in the 1971 European Cup Final

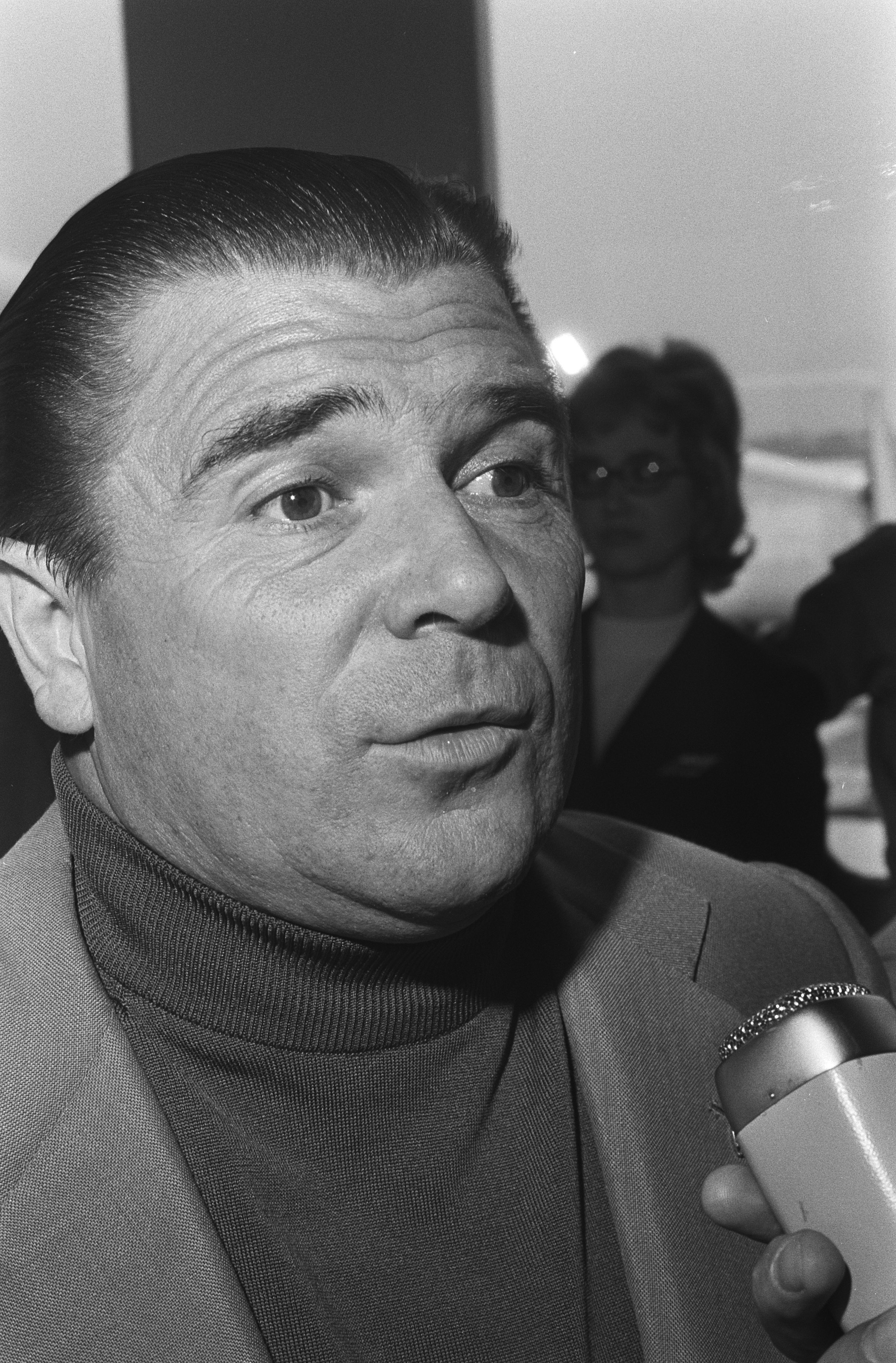
Ferenc Puskás, head coach of Panathinaikos (1970–1974)

After the war, the boxing department was re-founded in 1946, the diving department was created in 1947, the weightlifting department in 1959, the chess department in 1960, the fencing department was re-founded in 1960, the gymnastics department in 1962, the waterskiing department in 1963 and a wrestling department in 1965.

Panathinaikos' hardcore fans are called Gate 13 and are the oldest union of supporters in Greece. Gate 13 was founded in 1966. Furthermore, in the 1966 European Athletics Championships, the pole vaulter of the club and 13 times Greek champion, Christos Papanikolaou, won the silver medal.

The volleyball club has demonstrated many titles and honours due to the fact that the team roster has always included some of the top volleyball players in Greece. The first generation was that of the 1960s with Andreas and Nikos Bergeles as well as Iliopoulos, Leloudas, Chasapis, Emmanouel, Perros and Fotiou who opened the road for the next generations.

In 1970, Christos Papanikolaou jumped 5.49 metres (18.0 ft) to capture the world record. It was the first pole vault over 18 feet (5.5 m).

Panathinaikos soon dominated Greek football along with rivals Olympiacos and AEK and, although they are second in domestic titles, they have done better than any other Greek club in the European competitions. In 1971, Panathinaikos became the first and only Greek team – so far – to have reached the final of a European competition, when they faced Ajax in Wembley Stadium for the European Cup, losing 2–0. In the late 1970s, when football became professional in Greece, the club's football department passed to the hands of the Vardinogiannis family. In the following 30 years the team won the Greek championship 7 times, while in Europe the team reached also the semi-finals of the UEFA Champions League two more times, in 1985 and 1996.

In 1974, the table tennis team reached the semi-finals of the ETTU Cup. In 1978, the modern pentathlon department was founded and in 1980, the judo department. An important achievement for the volleyball team was the participation in the final of the CEV Cup Winners' Cup in 1980. During the following years, Panathinaikos continued to perform well in Greek volleyball with players such as Kazazis, Tentzeris, Gontikas (later president of Panathinaikos F.C.), Galakos, Dimitriadis and Margaronis.

The archery department was founded in 1981 and a futsal department in 1990.

=== 1991–2000 ===
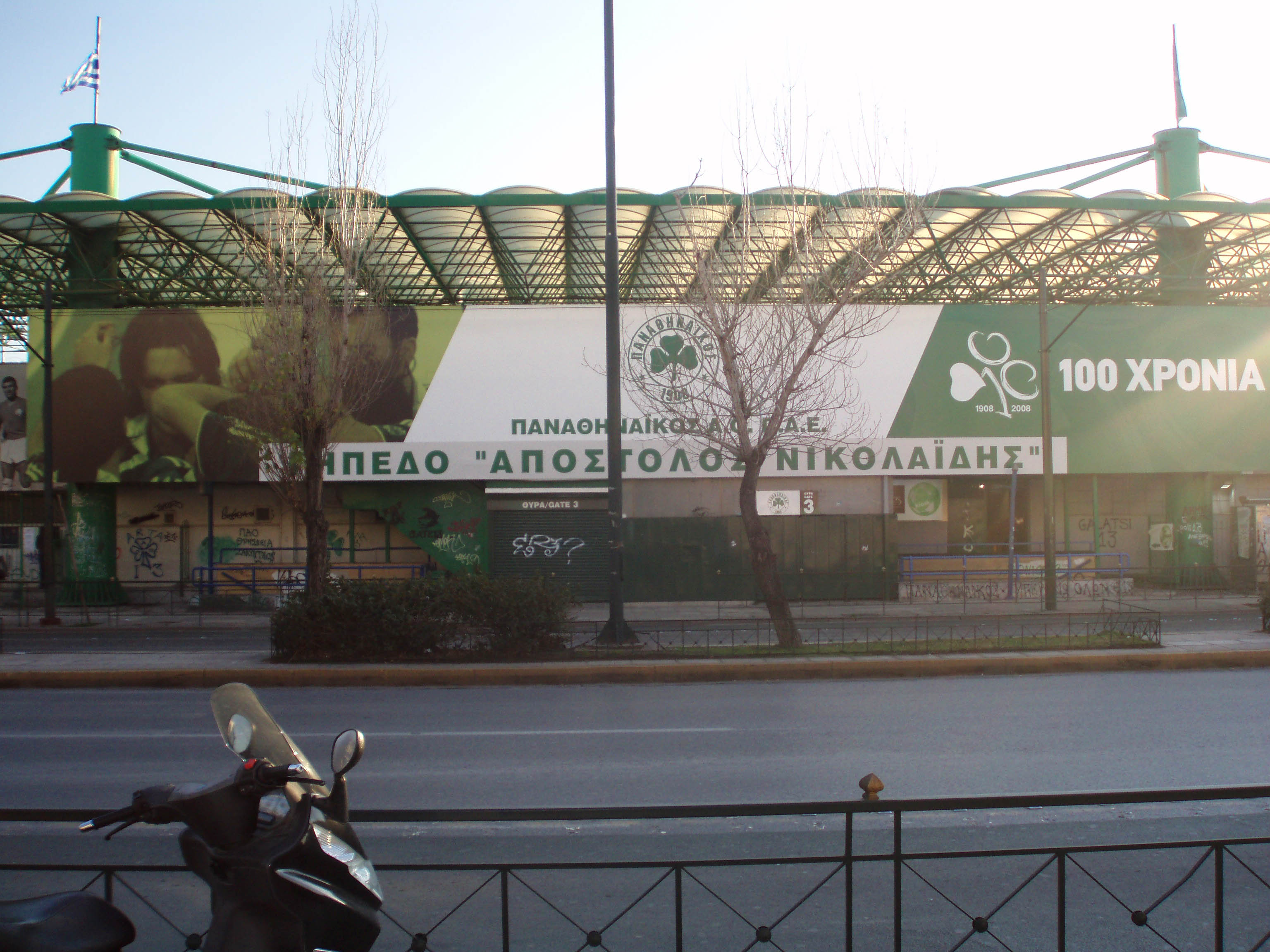
Leoforos Alexandras Stadium

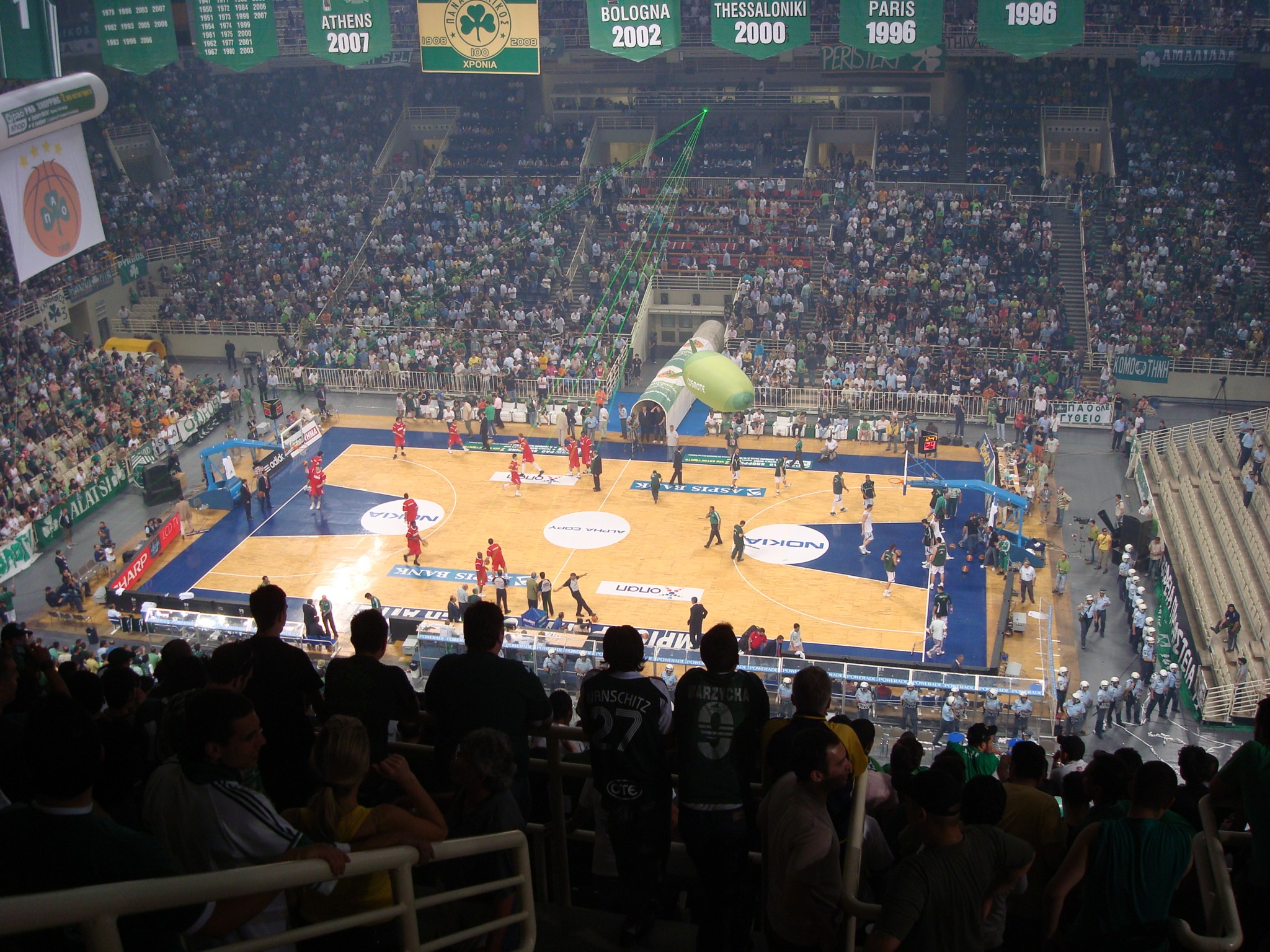
Olympic Indoor Hall during a Panathinaikos B.C. game.

Another successful period for the volleyball team was the seasons 1994–95 and 1995–96 when Panathinaikos won two Greek Championships in a row with Stelios Prosalikas as head coach and Andreopoulos, Triantafyllidis, Filippov, Spanos, Chatziantoniou, Ouzounov, A. Kovatsev, S. Kovatsev, Karamaroudis and Tonev as players.

The men's basketball department became professional in 1992 and since then is owned by two pharmaceutical magnates, the brothers Pavlos and Thanassis Giannakopoulos. In 1996 in Paris final-four (F4), Panathinaikos was the first Greek team to win a European Champions' Cup (now called Euroleague), beating Barcelona in a unique final, by 67–66. In September of the same year the team also won the Intercontinental Cup, prevailing by 2–1 wins over Olimpia of Argentina (83–89, 83–78, 101–76). In the same year, the football team reached the UEFA Champions League semi-finals.

In 2000, in the F4 of Thessaloniki, Panathinaikos were the Champions of Europe for the second time, beating Maccabi 73–67 in the final. In 2002 in Bologna, they conquered the most prestigious European trophy for the third time, beating hosts Kinder Bologna 89–83. Also, in 2000, the women's volleyball team reached the CEV Cup final.

=== 2001–present ===
In 2007 in Athens F4, Panathinaikos BC were crowned European Champions for the fourth time, beating CSKA Moscow 93–91. In 2009 in Berlin, the "greens" defeated again CSKA 73–71 to become the Champions of Europe for the fifth time.

In 2009, the men's volleyball team reached the CEV Cup final, while the women's volleyball team reached the Challenge Cup final.

The sixth Euroleague triumph for Panathinaikos BC came in Barcelona in 2011, after defeating Maccabi 78–70 in the final. Panathinaikos BC became so, the second most successful club (behind Real Madrid) in the history of the competition.

In 2013, a new sports department was founded for the first time after many years. It is the rugby team, which was announced on 7 November 2013, while the re-foundation of the field hockey department and the creation also of a baseball team was announced in 2014.

On 29 December 2016, following the trend of other sports clubs getting involved in esports, the club announced the establishment of Panathinaikos Esports.

In December 2018, Panathinaikos proceeded to the foundation of Wheelchair Basketball department.

== Crest ==
Michalis Papazoglou, a member of the Greek Resistance

In 1918, Michalis Papazoglou proposed the trifolium as emblem of Panathinaikos, symbol of harmony, unity, nature, and good luck. Georgios Chatzopoulos, member of the club (later President) and director of the National Gallery, took over to design the emblem for the club. Up to the end of the 1970s, a trifolium (green or white) was sewed on the heart's side on the jersey of the club΄s teams.

With the beginning of professionalism in the Greek football, the crest of the FC was created, accompanied by the club initials and the year of founding (1908). The basketball team uses also since 1992 its own logo.

In 2014, the direction of the club introduced a separate crest for the whole club and all the amateur departments.

=== Crest evolution ===
until 2014

100 years anniversary crest

2014-2020

2020–present

== Description and major titles of the professional departments ==
=== Panathinaikos men's football ===
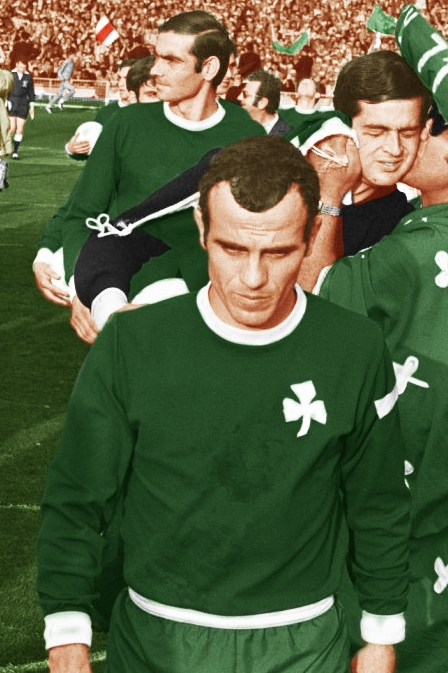
Mimis Domazos

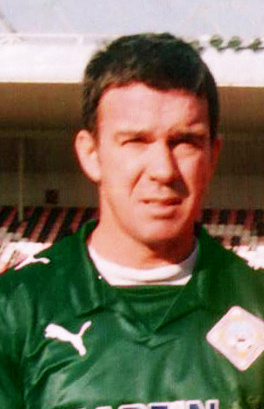
Dimitris Saravakos

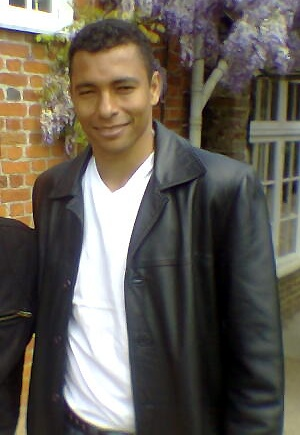
Gilberto Silva

Football is the first and oldest department of the club. The football team of Panathinaikos is the only Greek that has reached the UEFA Champions League final (in 1971) and semi-finals (in 1985 and 1996), such as the Intercontinental Cup final.

- Greek Super League: (20): 1930, 1949, 1953, 1960, 1961, 1962, 1964, 1965, 1969, 1970, 1972, 1977, 1984, 1986, 1990, 1991, 1995, 1996, 2004, 2010
- Greek Cup: (20): 1940, 1948, 1955, 1967, 1969, 1977, 1982, 1984, 1986, 1988, 1989, 1991, 1993, 1994, 1995, 2004, 2010, 2014, 2022, 2024
- Greek Super Cup: (3) : 1988, 1993, 1994,
- Balkans Cup: (1): 1977

=== Panathinaikos men's basketball ===
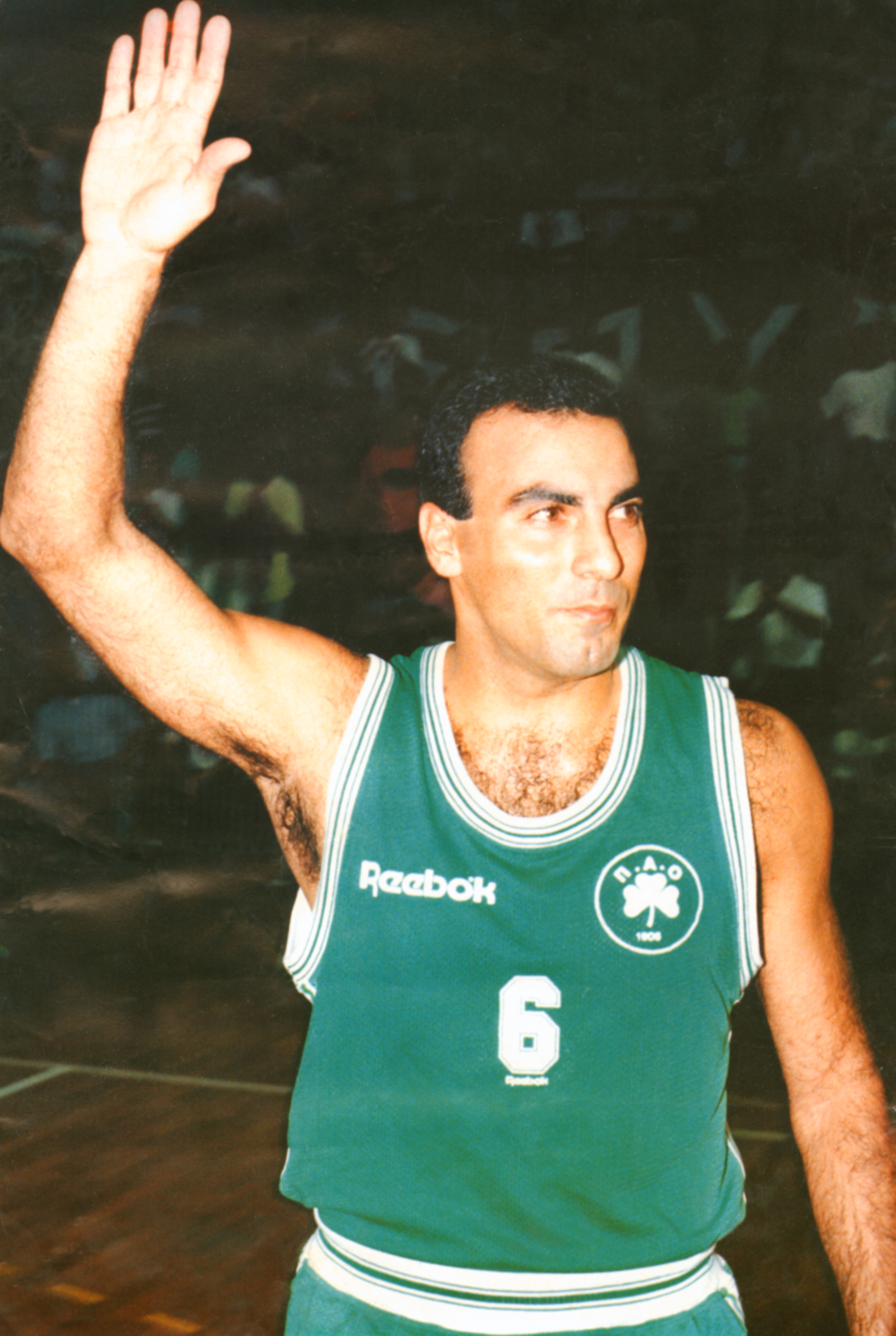
Nikos Galis

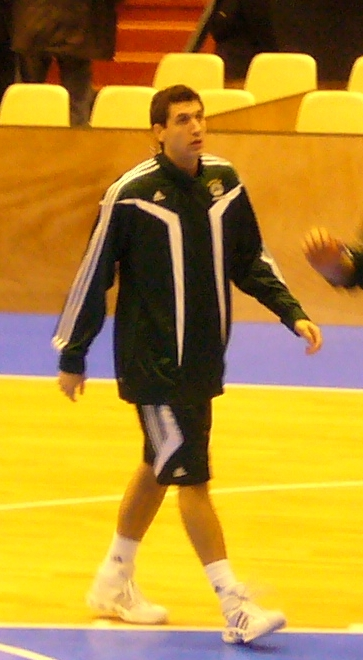
Dimitris Diamantidis

Founded in 1919, the basketball team of the club is the most successful in Greece and one of the most successful in Europe, with seven Euroleague and one Intercontinental Cup.

- Greek Basket League: (40) (record): 1946, 1947, 1950, 1951, 1954, 1961, 1962, 1967, 1969, 1971, 1972, 1973, 1974, 1975, 1977, 1980, 1981, 1982, 1984, 1998, 1999, 2000, 2001, 2003, 2004, 2005, 2006, 2007, 2008, 2009, 2010, 2011, 2013, 2014, 2017, 2018, 2019, 2020, 2021, 2024
- Greek Cup: (22) (record): 1979, 1982, 1983, 1986, 1993, 1996, 2003, 2005, 2006, 2007, 2008, 2009, 2012, 2013, 2014, 2015, 2016, 2017, 2019, 2021, 2025
- Greek Super Cup: (1) : 2021
- Euroleague: (7) (Greek record): 1996, 2000, 2002, 2007, 2009, 2011, 2024
- Intercontinental Cup: (1): 1996

== Description and major titles of the amateur departments ==
=== Panathinaikos women's basketball ===
The department was founded in 1937, the first in the country.

- Greek Basket League: (5): 1998, 2000, 2005, 2013, 2021
- Greek Cup: (3): 2000, 2023, 2024

=== Panathinaikos men's volleyball ===
The volleyball department was founded in 1919. it is one of the oldest and most successful volleyball teams in Greece.

- Greek Volley League: (22): 1963, 1965, 1966, 1967, 1970, 1971, 1972, 1973, 1975, 1977, 1982, 1984, 1985, 1986, 1995, 1996, 2004, 2006, 2020, 2022 2025, 2026
- Greek Cup: (7): 1982, 1984, 1985, 2007, 2008, 2010, 2026
- Greek League Cup: (4): 2020, 2022, 2023, 2024
- Greek Super Cup: (3): 2006, 2022, 2026

=== Panathinaikos women's volleyball ===
The department was founded in 1969 and is the women's volleyball team with more trophies in Greece.

- Greek Volley League: (27) (record): 1971, 1972, 1973, 1977, 1978, 1979, 1982, 1983, 1985, 1988, 1990, 1991, 1992, 1993, 1998, 2000, 2005, 2006, 2007, 2008, 2009, 2010, 2011, 2022, 2023, 2024, 2026
- Greek Cup: (6): 2005, 2006, 2008, 2009, 2010, 2022

=== Panathinaikos athletics ===
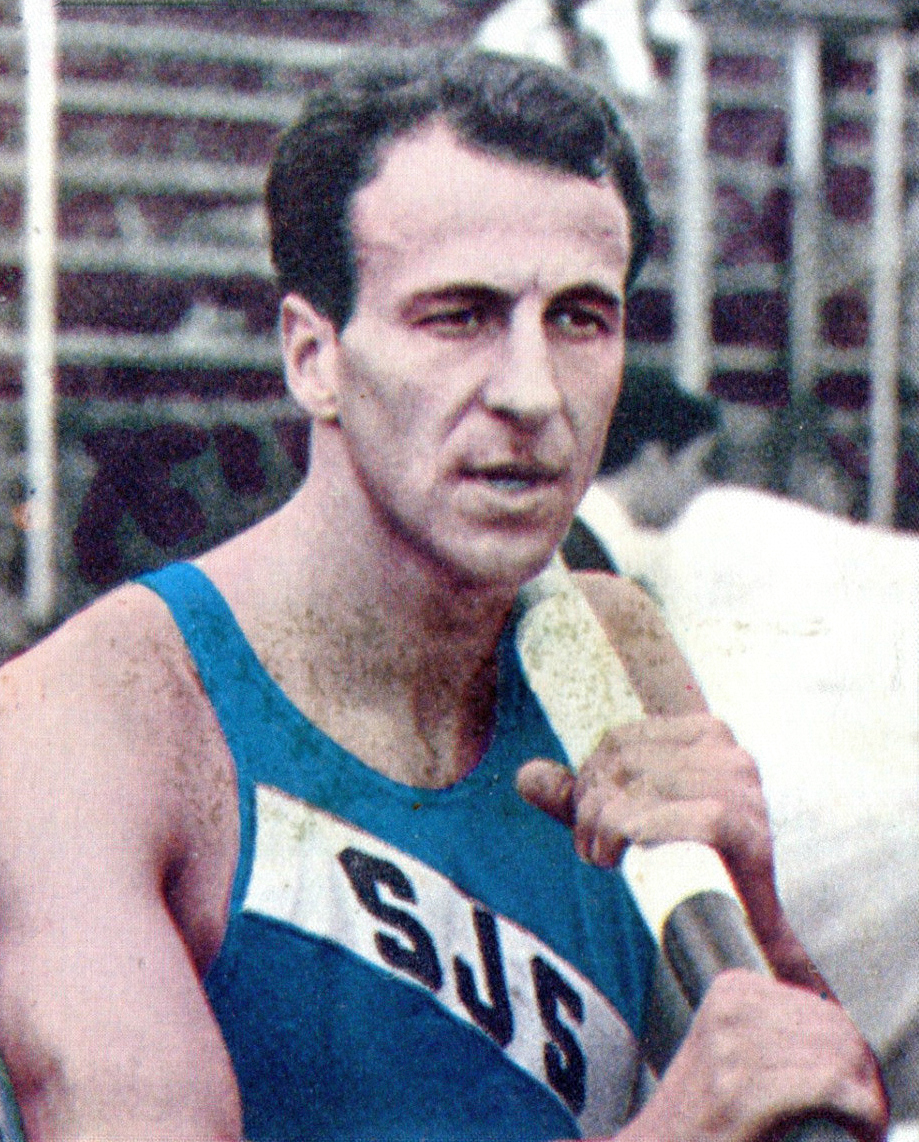
Christos Papanikolaou

The athletics department was founded in 1919. The first athletes were the football players of the club.

- Greek Championship, Men: (25): 1955, 1956, 1957, 1958, 1959, 1960, 1961, 1962, 1963, 1964, 1965, 1966, 1967, 1968, 1969, 1970, 1971, 1972, 1973, 1974, 1977, 1989, 1990, 2025, 2026
- Greek Championship, Women: (3): 1946, 1947, 1949
- Greek Indoor Championship, Men: (7): 1986, 1989, 1990, 2023, 2024, 2025, 2026
- Greek Indoor Championship, Women: (3): 2023, 2024, 2026
- Greek Cross Country Championship, Men: (27) (record): 1930, 1931, 1932, 1933, 1934, 1938, 1954, 1955, 1956, 1968, 1969, 1970, 1971, 1972, 1973, 1974, 1975, 1977, 1978, 1979, 1980, 1983, 1996, 1997, 2012, 2016, 2021
- Greek Cross Country Championship, Women: (9): 1949, 1950, 1983, 1984, 1985, 1986, 2017, 2022, 2024

=== Panathinaikos cycling ===
Founded in 1928, it is one of the most successful departments of Panathinaikos.

- Greek Championship: (8): 1951, 1956, 1958, 1963, 1967, 1969, 1970, 1973
- Greek Championship, Track Standings Men: (7): 1954, 1956, 1958, 1967, 1968, 1969, 2017
- Greek Championship, Road Bicycle Men: (9): 1972, 1980, 1981, 1982, 1983, 1984, 1985, 1989, 1990

=== Panathinaikos table tennis ===
The department was founded in 1924 by Nikos Mantzaroglou.

- Greek Clubs' Championship, Men: (11): 1951, 1952, 1955, 1956, 1959, 1960, 1961, 1962, 1966, 1968, 1975
- Greek Clubs' Championship, Women: (4): 1972, 1973, 1974, 2026
- Greek Cup, Men: (3): 1965,1966, 1969
- Greek Cup, Women: (2): 1972, 2022
- ETTU Europe Trophy, Men: (2): 2024, 2026
- ETTU Europe Trophy, Women: 2022

=== Panathinaikos boxing ===
It was founded in 1912 by John Cyril Campbell, the coach of the football team.

- Greek Championship, Men: (30) (record): 1949, 1951, 1952, 1957, 1958, 1959, 1960, 1964, 1966, 1967, 1968, 1969, 1971, 1972, 1973, 1974, 1975, 1976, 1977, 1982, 1986, 1992, 1993, 1996, 1997, 1998, 2011, 2015, 2016, 2023

=== Panathinaikos fencing ===
Just like the boxing department, it was founded in 1912 by John Cyril Campbell, the coach of the football team.

- Greek Championship, Overall Standings: (13): 1963, 1964, 1965, 1966, 1967, 1968, 1969, 1970, 1971, 1972, 1973, 1974, 1975

=== Panathinaikos archery ===
- Greek Championship, Men: (4): 1983, 1984, 1985, 2018

=== Panathinaikos shooting ===
- Greek Championship, Bullseye Shooting: (11): 1960, 1964, 1982, 1983, 1984, 1989, 1990, 1991, 2022, 2023, 2024
- Greek Championship, Clay Target: (1): 2021

=== Panathinaikos diving ===
- Greek Championship, Overall Standings: (8): 1969, 1972, 1975, 2015, 2016, 2017, 2023, 2024

=== Panathinaikos swimming ===
- Greek Championship, Men: (12): 1952, 1953, 1954, 1955, 1956, 1957, 1958, 1963, 1964, 1965, 1966, 1968
- Greek Championship, Women: (7): 1962, 1963, 1964, 1965, 1966, 1968, 1969
- Greek Masters Championship: (6) (record): 2018, 2019, 2021, 2022, 2023, 2024

=== Panathinaikos weightlifting ===
- Greek Championship, Men: (5): 1964, 1965, 1966, 1967, 1968
- Greek Championship, Women: (2): 2021, 2023

=== Panathinaikos modern pentathlon ===
- Greek Championship, Men: (2): 1980, 1987

=== Panathinaikos wrestling ===
- Greek Championship, Men: (2): 2014, 2015

=== Panathinaikos chess ===
- Greek Championship: (5): 1966, 1970, 1971, 1973, 2026
- Greek Cup: (3): 1973, 1974, 2026

== Panathinaikos People with Disabilities ==
Panathinaikos Athletic Club People with Disabilities is the parasports department of the Greek sports club Panathinaikos, established on 3 December 2018. Its aim is to enable people with disabilities to compete in sports.

=== Panathinaikos amputee football ===
- Greek League: (2) : 2022, 2026
- Greek Cup: (1) : 2021

=== Panathinaikos wheelchair basketball ===
- Greek League : (2): 2022, 2024
- Greek Cup: (2): 2022, 2024
- Greek Super Cup: (1): 2022

=== Panathinaikos wheelchair fencing ===
- Greek Championships Men and Women: (4) : 2021, 2022, 2023, 2024

== Notable athletes ==
- Football: Antonis Antoniadis, Stratos Apostolakis, Marcus Berg, Juan José Borrelli, Djibril Cisse, Mimis Domazos, Kostas Frantzeskos, Mijat Gacinovic, Ezequiel González, Takis Ikonomopoulos, Giorgos Kalafatis, Anthimos Kapsis, Giorgos Karagounis, Michalis Konstantinou, Giannis Kyrastas, Sebastián Leto, Kostas Linoxilakis, Takis Loukanidis, Angelos Messaris, Antonis Migiakis, Lakis Petropoulos, Juan Ramón Rocha, Dimitris Saravakos, Giourkas Seitaridis, Paulo Sousa, Gilberto Silva, Juan Ramón Verón, Krzysztof Warzycha, Velimir Zajec, Vasilis Konstantinou
- Basketball: Men: Fragiskos Alvertis, Liveris Andritsos, Michael Batiste, Dejan Bodiroga, Fanis Christodoulou, Dimitris Diamantidis, Nikos Galis, Panagiotis Giannakis, James Gist, Mike James, Šarūnas Jasikevičius, Robertas Javtokas, Giorgos Kolokithas, Apostolos Kontos, Jaka Lakovič, Faidon Matthaiou, Nikola Peković, Željko Rebrača, Byron Scott, Hugo Sconochini, Ramūnas Šiškauskas, David Stergakos, Dejan Tomašević, Kostas Tsartsaris, Dominique Wilkins Women: Dimitra Kalentzou, Jacki Gemelos, Dora Panteli
- Volleyball: Men: Liberman Agamez, Dante Amaral, Marcelo Elgarten, Hernando Gomez, Fernando Hernandez, Andre Nascimento, Clayton Stanley, Gerasimos Theodoratos, Paweł Zagumny Women: Ruxandra Dumitrescu, Xanthi Milona, Effrosyni Sfyri
- Athletics: Men: Rigas Efstathiadis, Antonis Kariofilis, Giannis Lambrou, Apostolos Nikolaidis, Michalis Papazoglou, Christos Papanikolaou, Konstantinos Poulios, Georgios Roubanis, Antonis Tritsis Women: Hrysopiyi Devetzi, Alexandra Papageorgiou
- Swimming: Romanos Alyfantis, Marianna Lymperta, Nery Mantey Niangkouara
- Boxing: Giannis Aidiniotis, Vangelis Ikonomakos, Dimitris Michael, Areti Mastrodouka
- Fencing: Panagiotis Dourakos, Ioannis Hatzisarantos, Andreas Vgenopoulos, Despina Georgiadou
- Cycling: Ilias Kelesidis
- Table Tennis: Nikos Mantzaroglou, Kostas Priftis
- Shooting: Athanasios Aravositas, Georgios Liveris, Georgios Marmaridis, Konstantinos Mylonas, Alkiviadis Papageorgopoulos

== Supporters ==
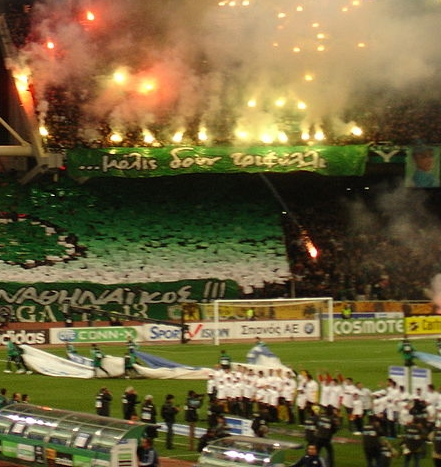
Fans of Panathinaikos in the Olympic Stadium of Athens

According to the most recent polls, Panathinaikos is one of the most popular clubs in Greece, with nearly 30,2% of the fans supporting them, and the most popular in greater Athens and the region of Attica. They have also a large fanbase in all Greek prefectures, in Cyprus and in the Greek diaspora. They have the largest fanbase among high educated people and the Greek upper class (traditionally representing the old Athenian society), while they are popular among middle and lower class also.

The main organized supporters of Panathinaikos are known as Gate 13 (est. 1966), which consists of around 80 clubs alongside Greece and Cyprus. Gate 13 style of supporting includes the use of green fireworks, large and small green flags, displaying of banners and especially the creation of colourful and large choreographies, noisy and constant cheering and other supporters stuff. Gate 13 has over the years become a part of the club by affecting club decisions and by following the club on all occasions. PALEFIP (Panhellenic club of Panathinaikos friends) is the other major supporters organization. Panathinaikos F.C. currently is the only supporter-owned football club in Greece.

Panathinaikos supporters hold both records of the most season tickets sales (31.091 in 2010) and highest average attendance for a unique season (44.942 in 1985–86 season) in the history of Greek football.

Regarding the basketball, the fans of Panathinaikos, notable for their passionate support, also hold continuous attendance European records, such as the 20,000 fans against Benetton Treviso in 2006 and the 30,000 (over 25.000 officially) viewers against FC Barcelona Bàsquet in 2013.

The club is quite popular among artist cycles (actors, musicians, singers etc.), as well as some notable politicians.

=== Notable supporters ===
- Sophia Aliberti, actress
- Giannis Bostantzoglou, actor
- Giannis Diakogiannis, sports journalist
- Giorgos Chatzinasios, composer
- Giannis Fertis, actor
- Petros Filipidis, actor
- Giorgos Fountas, actor
- Katerina Gogou, actress and anarchist poet
- Giannis Haroulis, singer
- Dimitris Horn, actor
- Liana Kanelli, journalist and member of the Greek Parliament
- Kostas Karafotis, singer
- Kostas Karamanlis, former Prime Minister of Greece
- George Karlaftis, NFL player
- Nikos Karvelas, songwriter, producer and singer
- Giorgos Katsaros, musician and songwriter
- Nikos Kourkoulos, actor
- Stamatis Kokkotas, singer
- Alexandros Lykourezos, lawyer
- Lavrentis Machairitsas, rock musician
- Zeta Makripoulia, model, actress and TV presenter
- Spyridon Merkouris, Mayor of Athens
- Stamatis Mercouris, politician and military officer
- Melina Mercouri, actress
- Andreas Mikroutsikos, songwriter, singer and TV presenter
- Thanos Mikroutsikos, composer
- Vicky Moscholiou, singer
- Klelia Pantazi, rhythmic gymnast and Olympic medal winner
- Aleka Papariga, former General Secretary of the Communist Party of Greece
- Yiannis Parios, singer and songwriter
- Nikos Pateras, shipowner
- Thanos Petrelis, singer
- Georgios Rallis, former Prime Minister of Greece
- Giannis Spaliaras, male model
- Marianna Toumasatou, actress
- Pavlos Tsimas, journalist
- Alexis Tsipras, leader of Coalition of the Radical Left and the current Prime Minister of Greece
- Theodoros Veniamis, shipowner and president of the Greek Union of Shipowners
- Anna Vissi, singer
- Aliki Vougiouklaki, actress
- Nikos Xilouris, composer and singer of Cretan music
- Giorgos Zambetas, musician
- Yannis Zouganelis, musician/comedian

== Gold trifolium ==
The Gold trifolium of Panathinaikos AC is the major club's award given to special personalities. According to sources it has been awarded to:

- Jack Nikolaidis, club's official and president
- Željko Obradović, basketball coach
- Nikolaos Plastiras, military officer and PM

== European and worldwide honours ==
Season	Football	Men's basketball	Women's basketball	Men's volleyball	Women's volleyball	Men's table tennis	Women's table tennis
1968–69		FIBA Saporta Cup; Semi-finals					
1970–71	European Cup; Final						
1970–71	Intercontinental Cup; Final						
1971–72		European Champions Cup; Semi-finals					
1973–74						ETTU Cup; Semi-finals	
1977–78	Balkans Cup; Winners						
1979–80				CEV Cup; 2nd place			
1980–81					Challenge Cup; 4th place		
1981–82		European Champions Cup; Semi-finals					
1984–85	European Cup; Semi-finals						
1987–88	UEFA Cup; Quarter-finals						
1988–89				CEV Cup; 3rd place			
1991–92	European Cup; Quarter-finals						
1993–94		FIBA European League; 3rd place					
1994–95		FIBA European League; 3rd place			CEV Cup; 4th place		
1995–96	UEFA Champions League; Semi-finals	FIBA European League; Champions					
1995–96	UEFA Champions League; Semi-finals	FIBA Intercontinental Cup; Winners					
1997–98		FIBA Saporta Cup; Semi-finals	Ronchetti Cup; Quarter-finals				
1999–00		EuroLeague; Champions			CEV Cup; Final		
2000–01		FIBA SuproLeague; Final					
2001–02	UEFA Champions League; Quarter-finals	EuroLeague; Champions					
2002–03	UEFA Cup; Quarter-finals						
2003–04				Challenge Cup; 4th place			
2004–05		Euroleague; 3rd place					
2005–06				CEV Cup; 3rd place			
2006–07		EuroLeague; Champions					
2007–08				CEV Champions League; Fase of 6			
2008–09		EuroLeague; Champions		CEV Cup; Final	Challenge Cup; Final		
2010–11		EuroLeague; Champions					
2011–12		Euroleague; 4th place					
2021–22				CEV Challenge Cup; Semi-finals			ETTU Europe Trophy; Winners
2022–23				CEV Challenge Cup; Semi-finals			
2023–24		EuroLeague; Champions				ETTU Europe Trophy; Winners	
2024–25		EuroLeague; 4th place					ETTU Europe Trophy; Semi-finals
2025–26			EuroCup; Quarter-finals		Challenge Cup; Final	ETTU Europe Trophy; Winners	ETTU Europe Trophy; 3rd place

== Gallery ==
Football

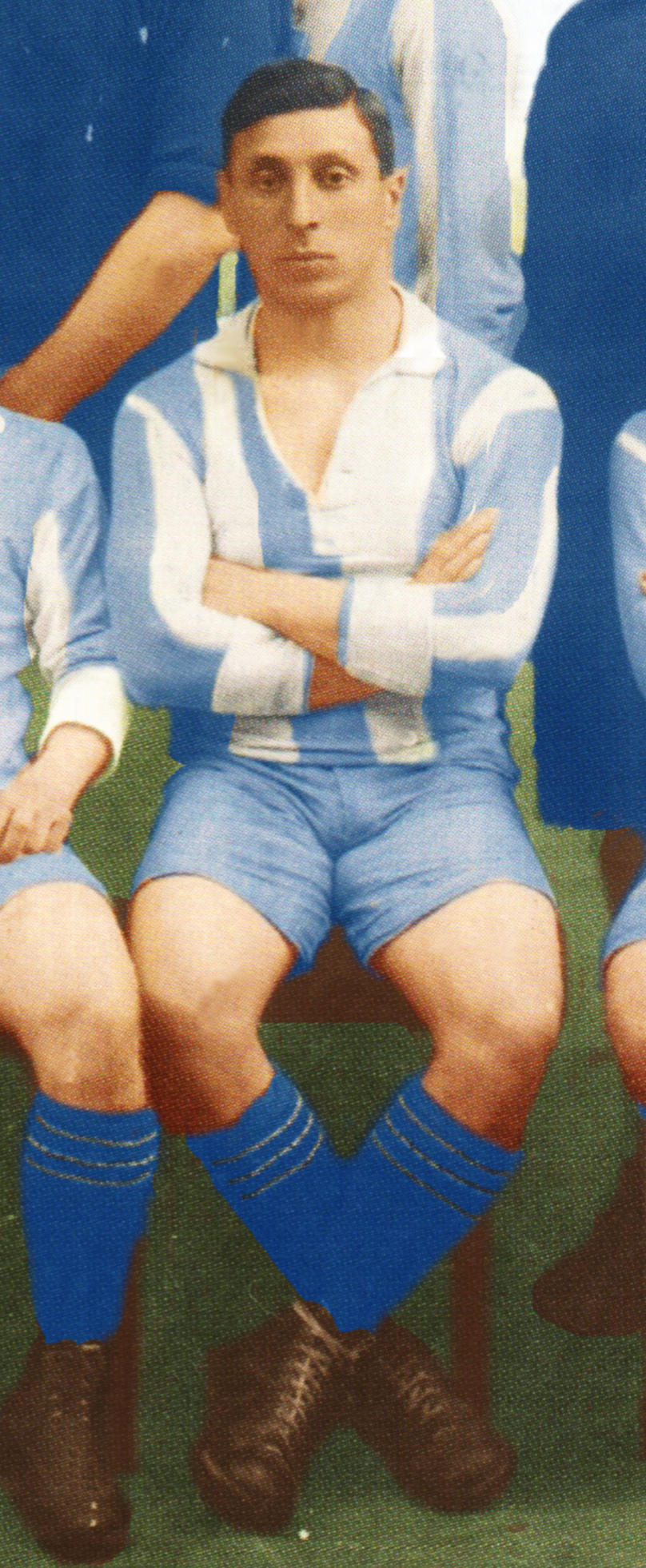
Giorgos Kalafatis with the national colours in the Inter-Allied Games (1919)

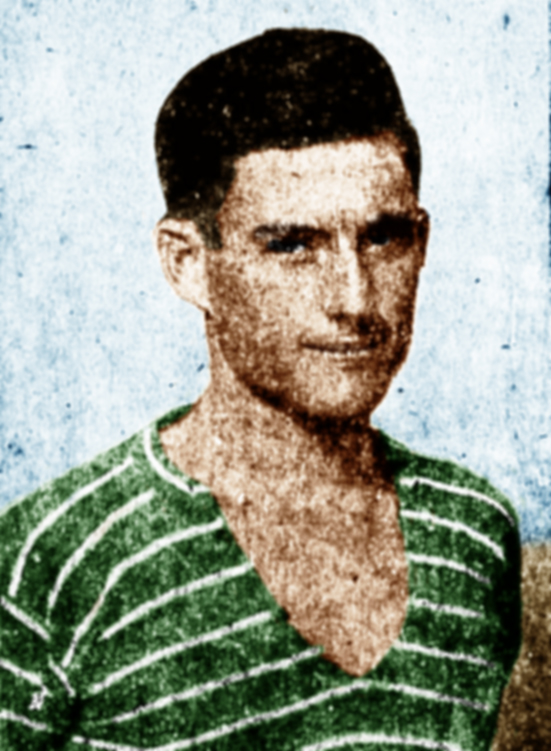
Angelos Messaris (1929)

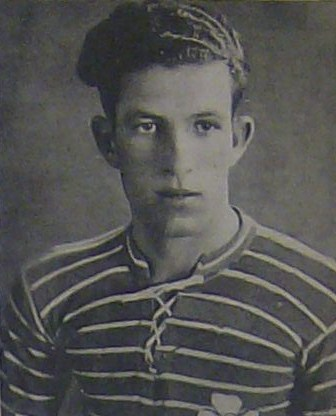
Mimis Pierrakos (1906–1940), killed during the Greco-Italian War

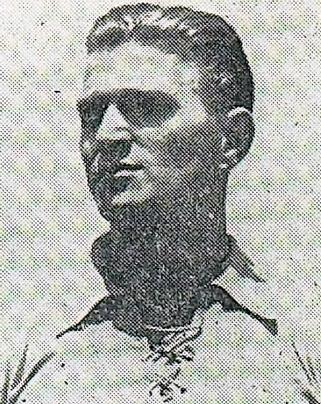
Stjepan Bobek

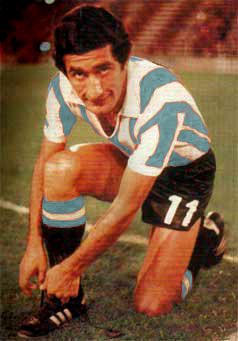
Juan Ramón Verón

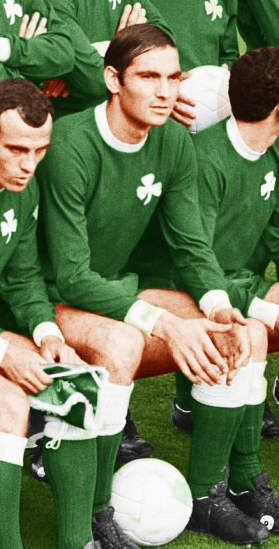
Antonis Antoniadis, a record 5 times top scorer for the Greek league

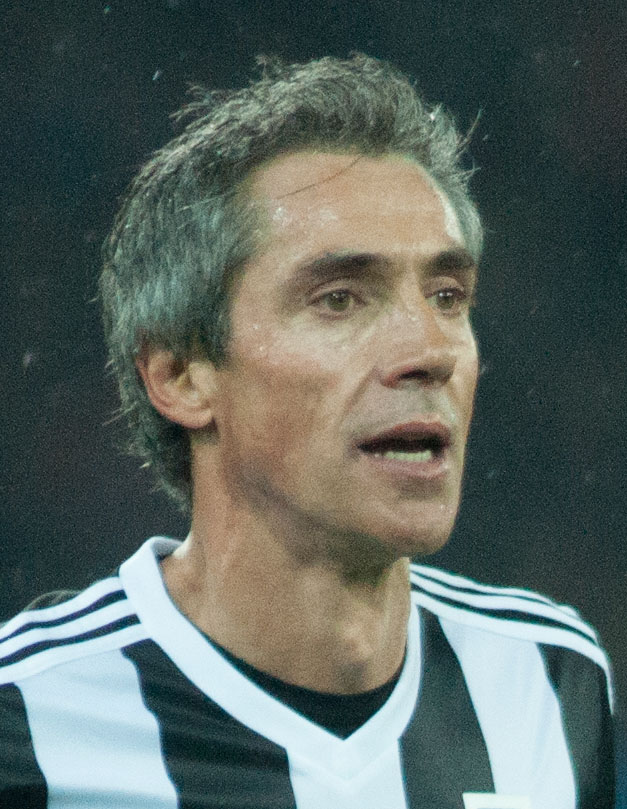
Paulo Sousa

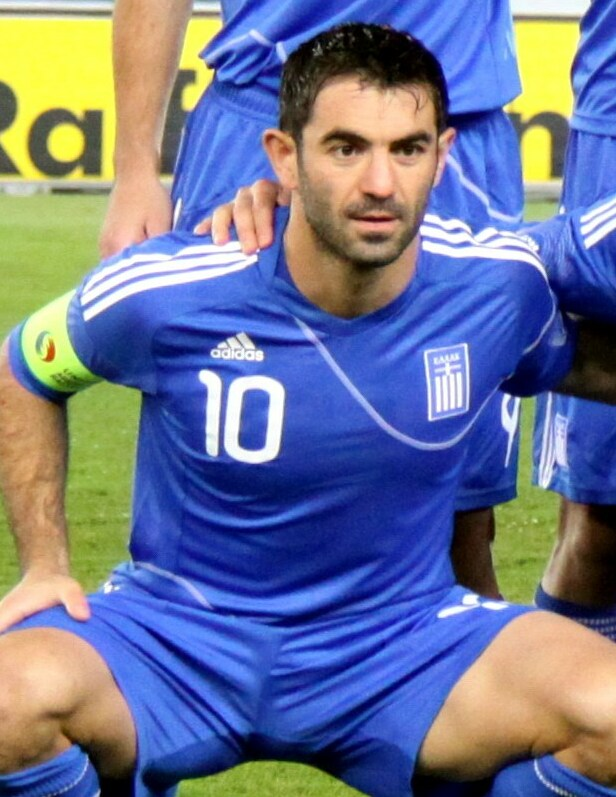
Giorgos Karagounis, captain of Panathinaikos and the Greece national football team

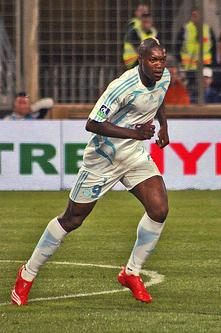
Djibril Cissé
Basketball

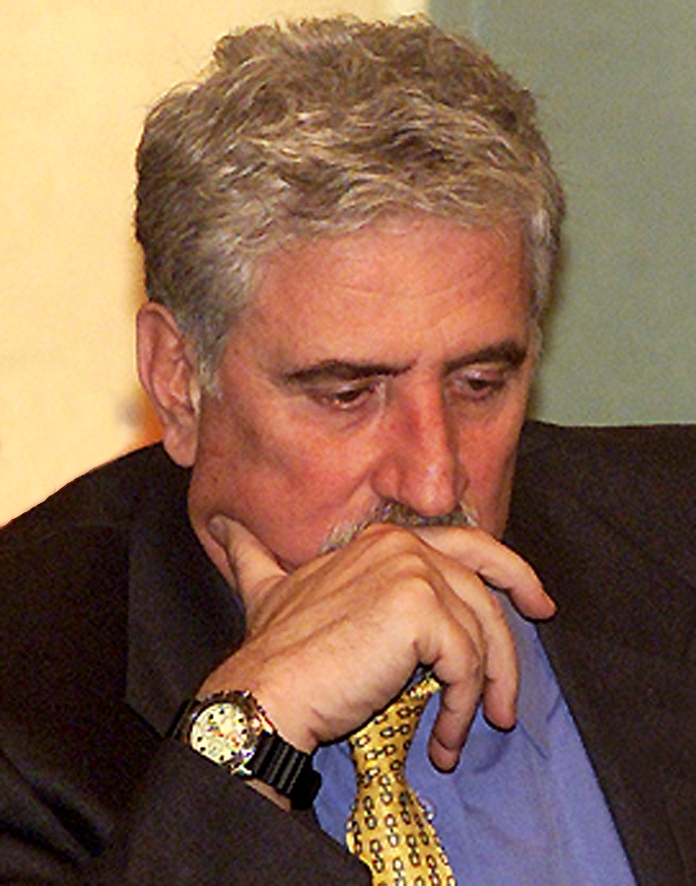
Giorgos Kolokythas

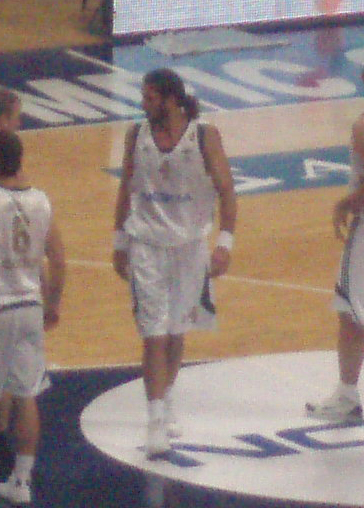
Frangiskos Alvertis, top scorer and game recordman of Panathinaikos BC

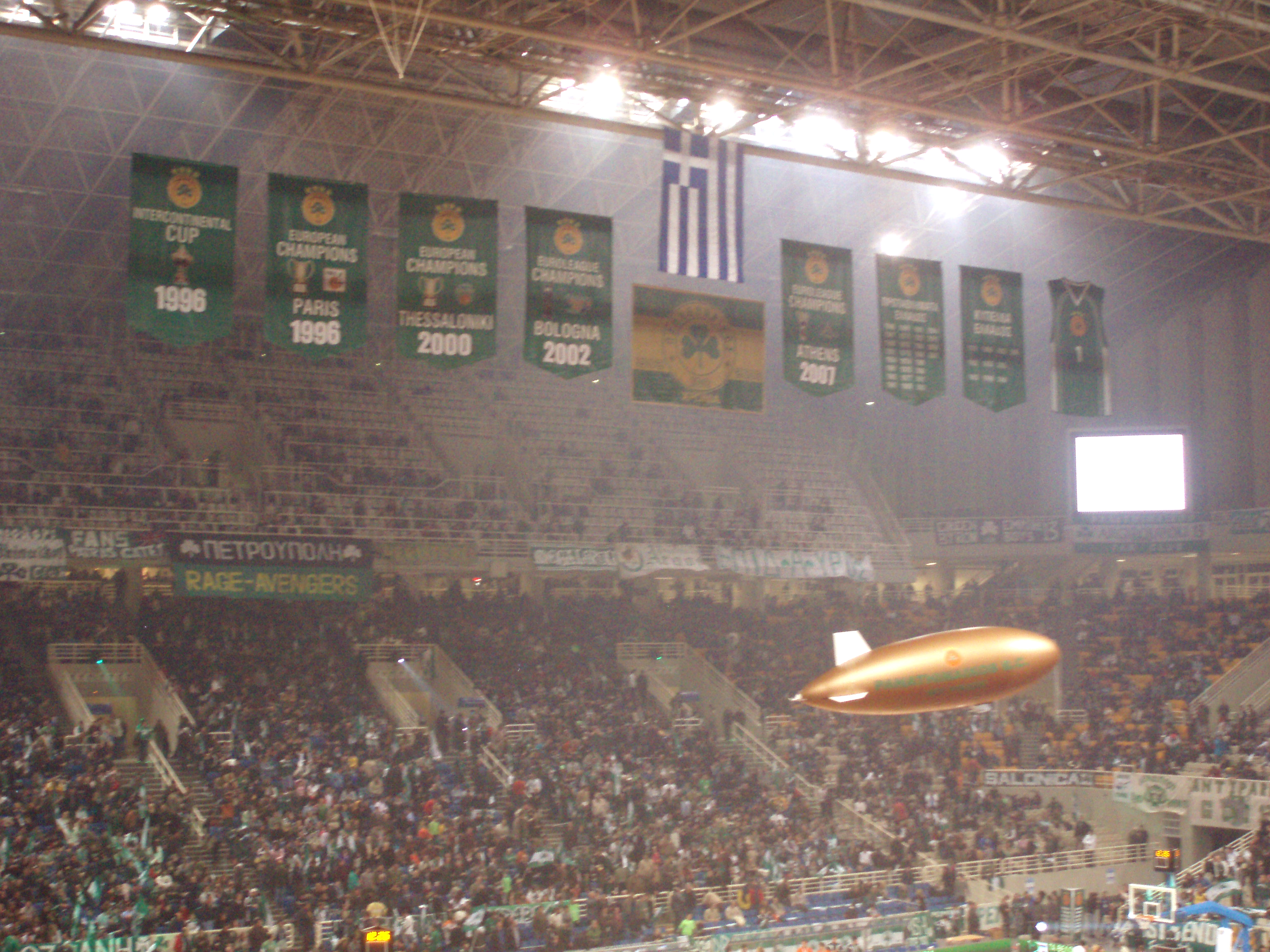
Flags and banners of Panathinaikos in OAKA

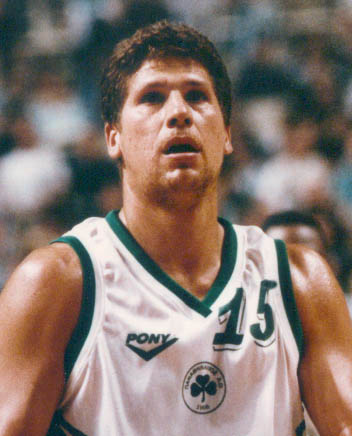
Fanis Christodoulou

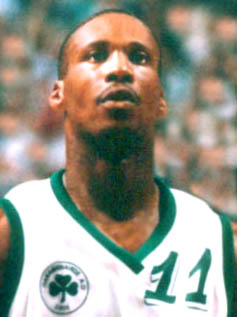
Byron Scott

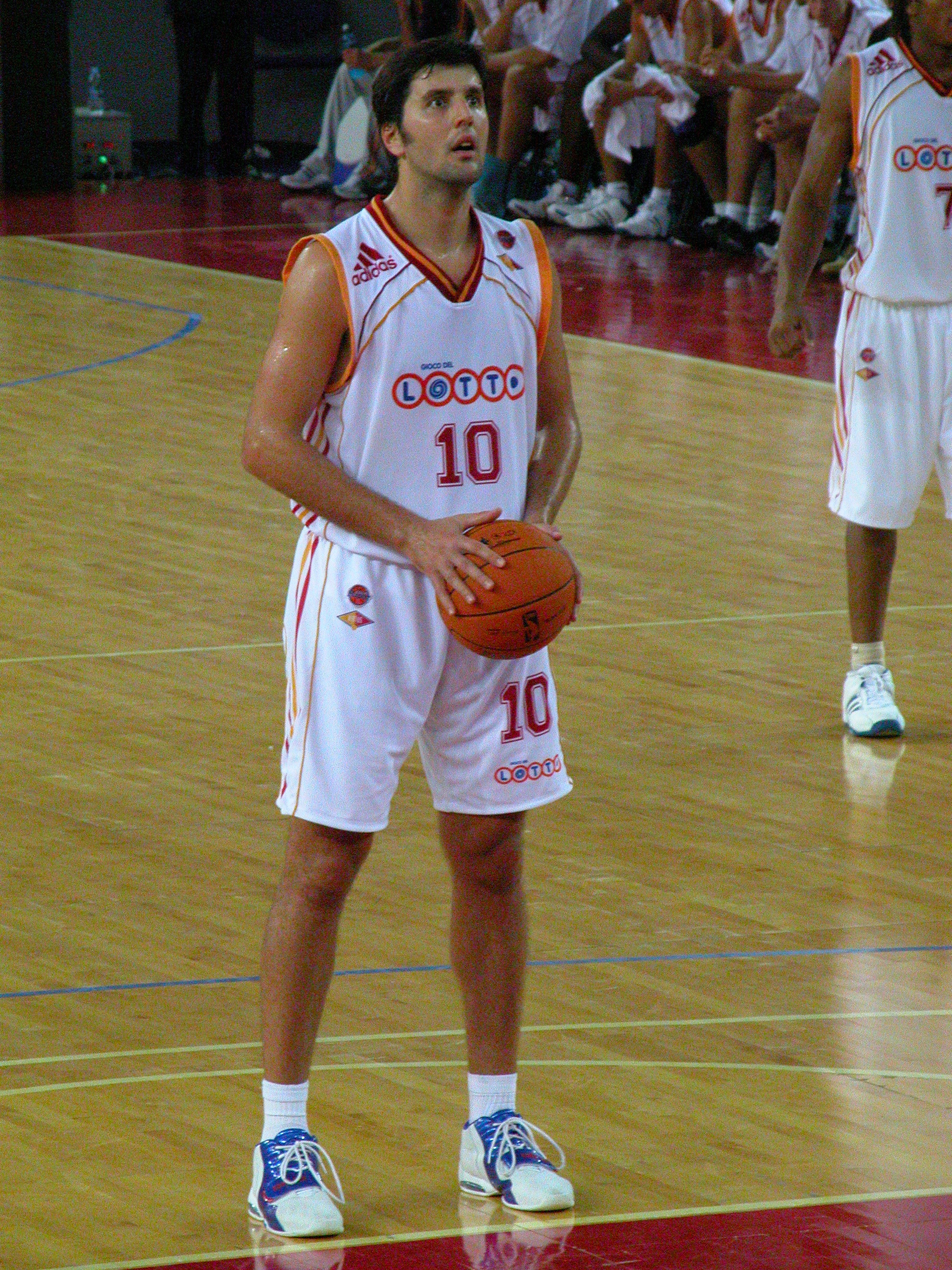
Dejan Bodiroga

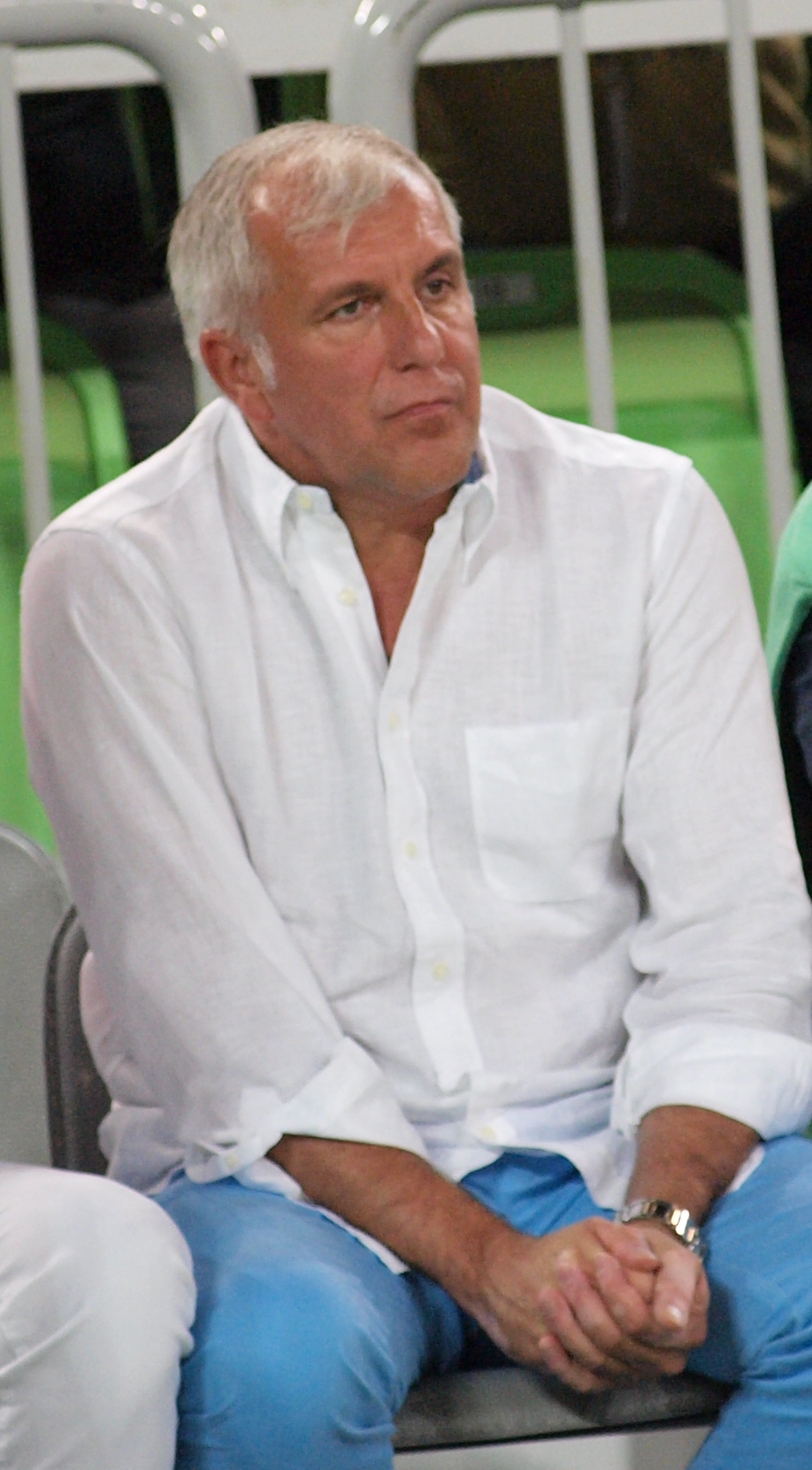
Željko Obradović

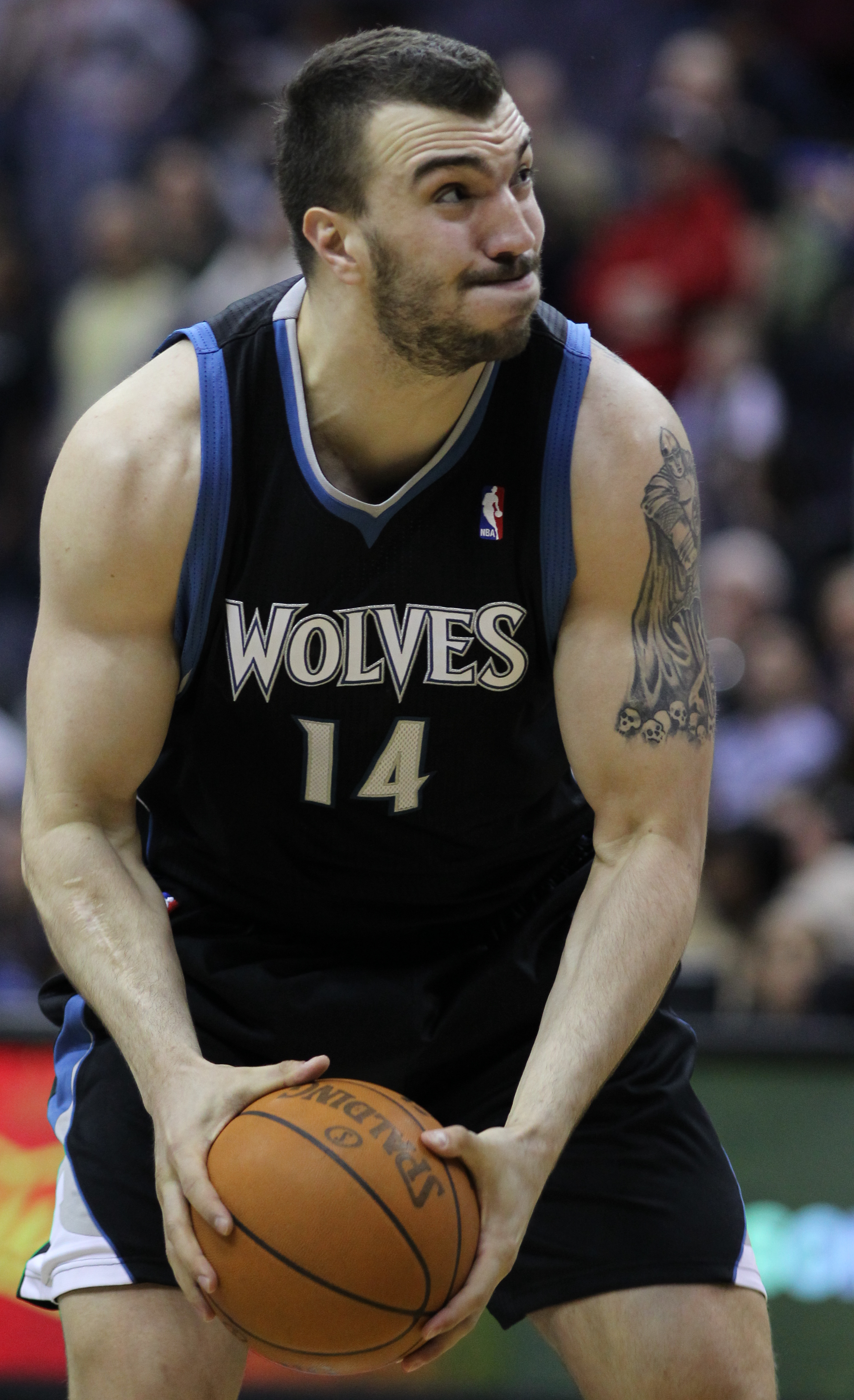
Nikola Peković

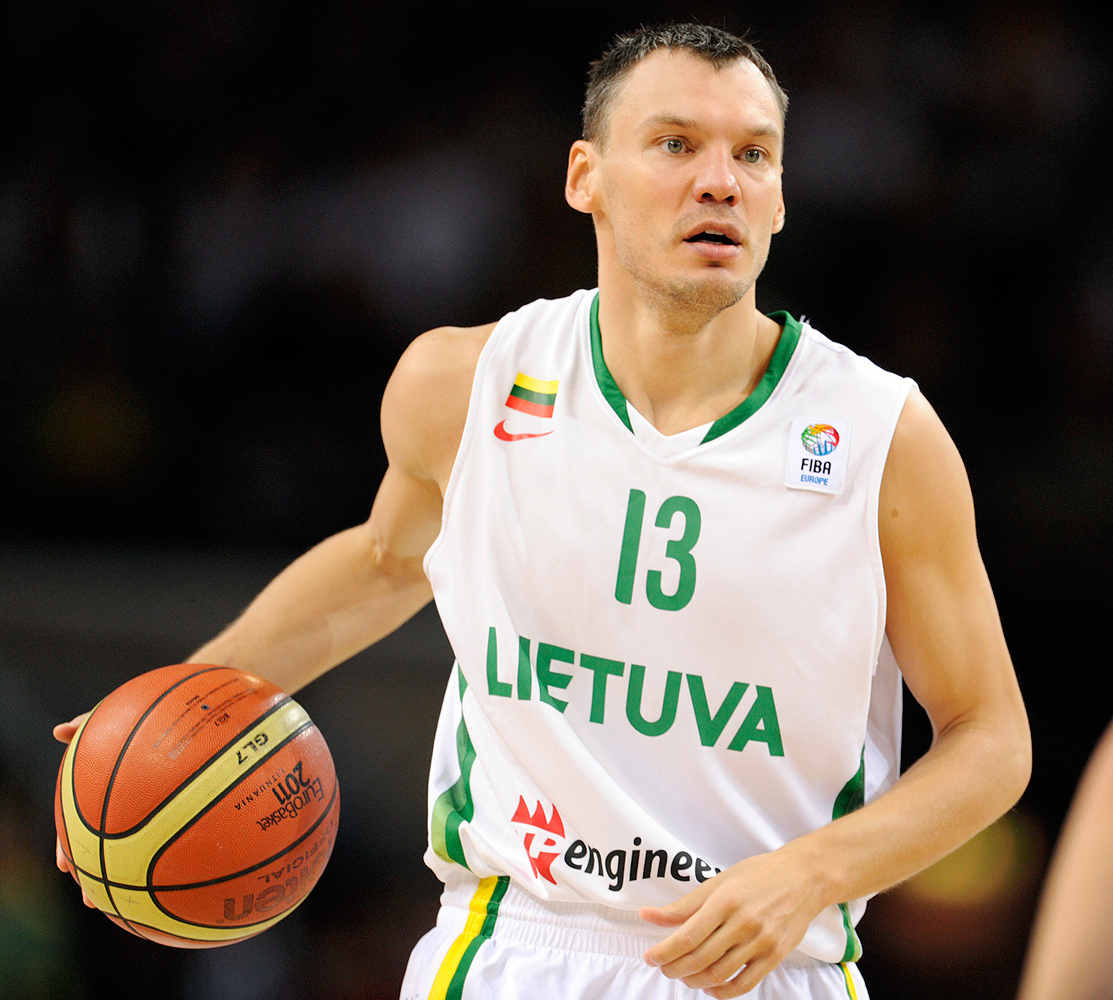
Šarūnas Jasikevičius

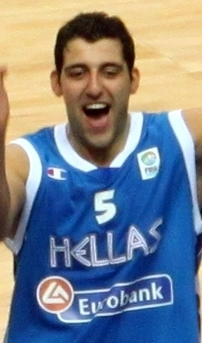
Ioannis Bourousis
Volleyball

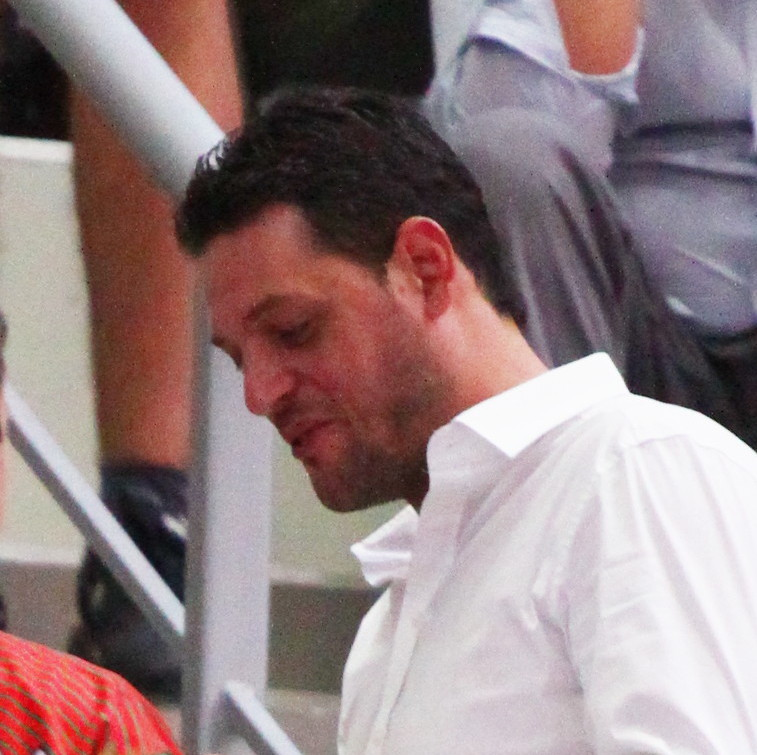
Plamen Konstantinov

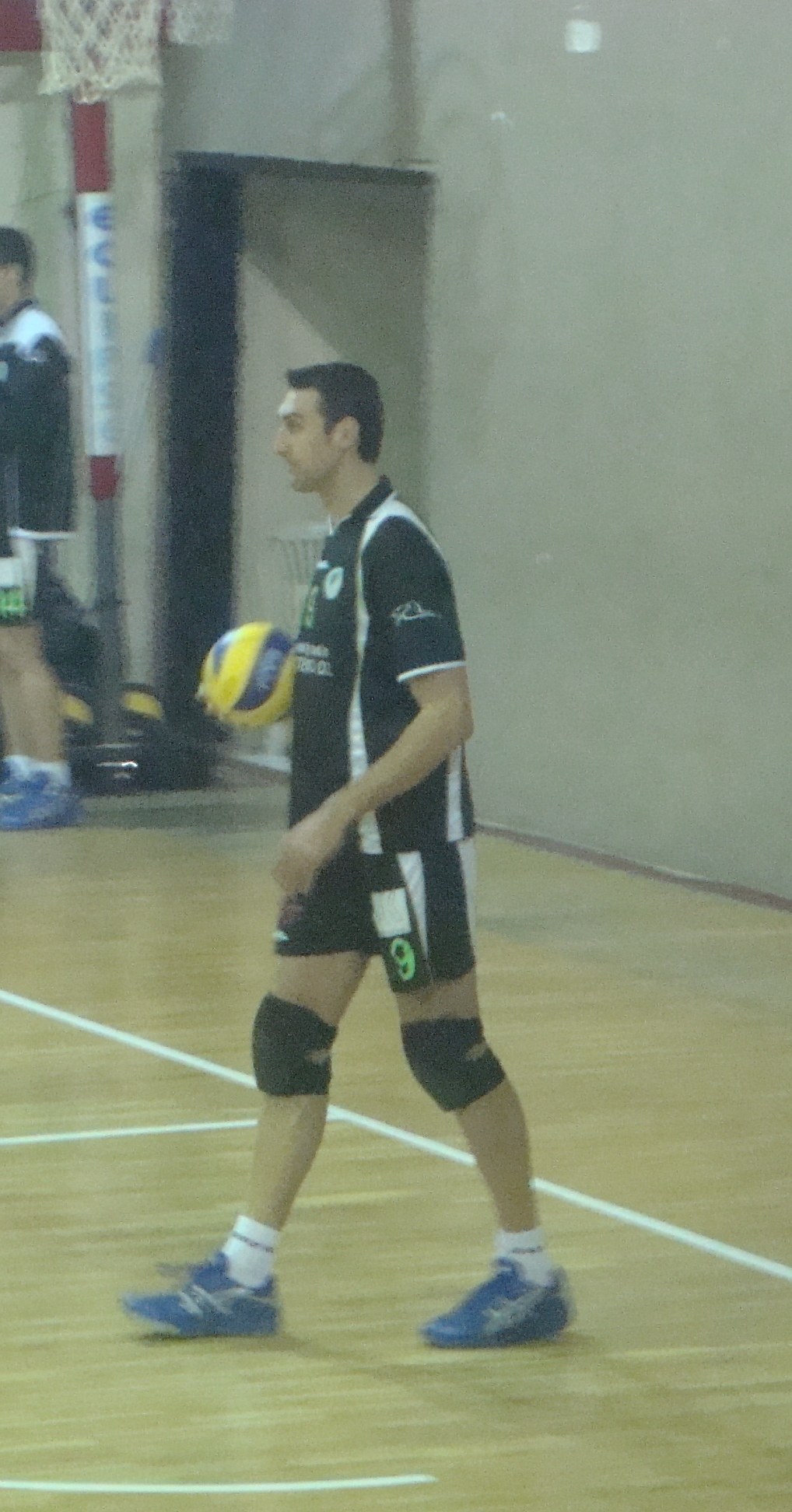
Nikos Samaras
Other

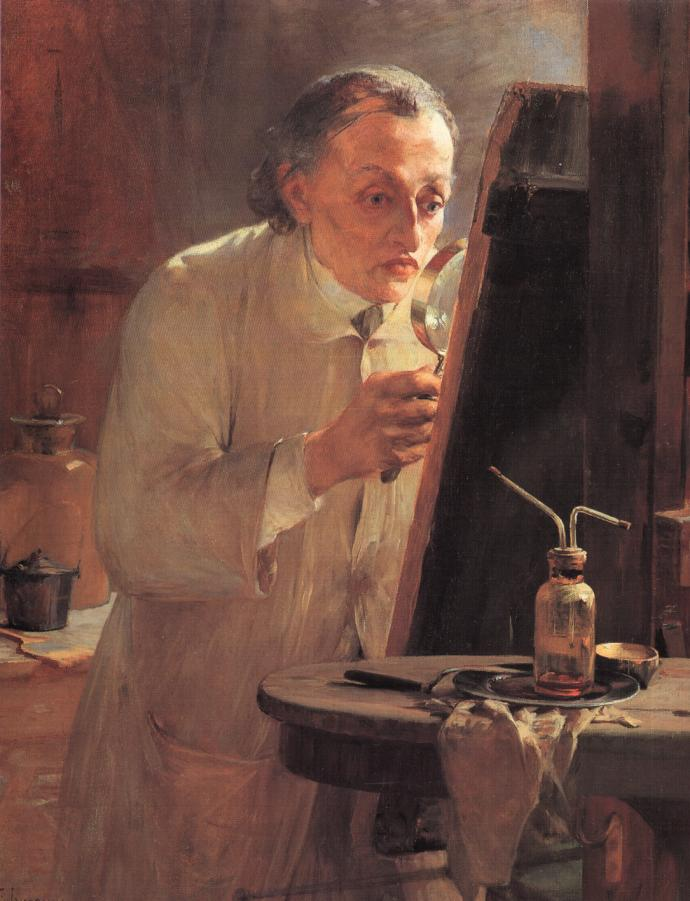
Georgios Chatzopoulos, President of the club, painter and director of the National Gallery

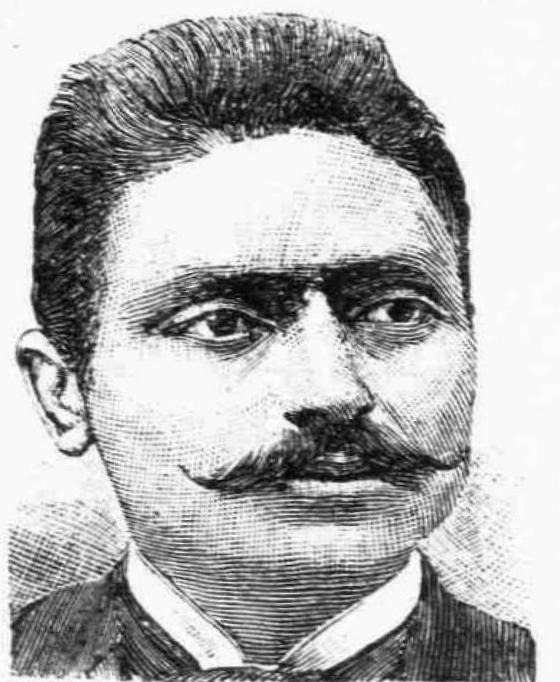
Pantelis Karasevdas, President of the club, a gold medalist at the 1896 Summer Olympics

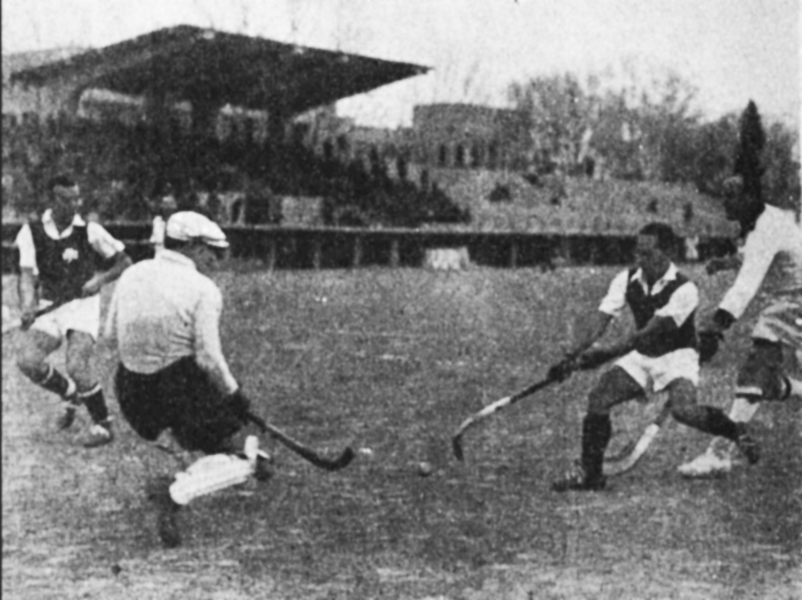
Field hockey in Leoforos (1927)

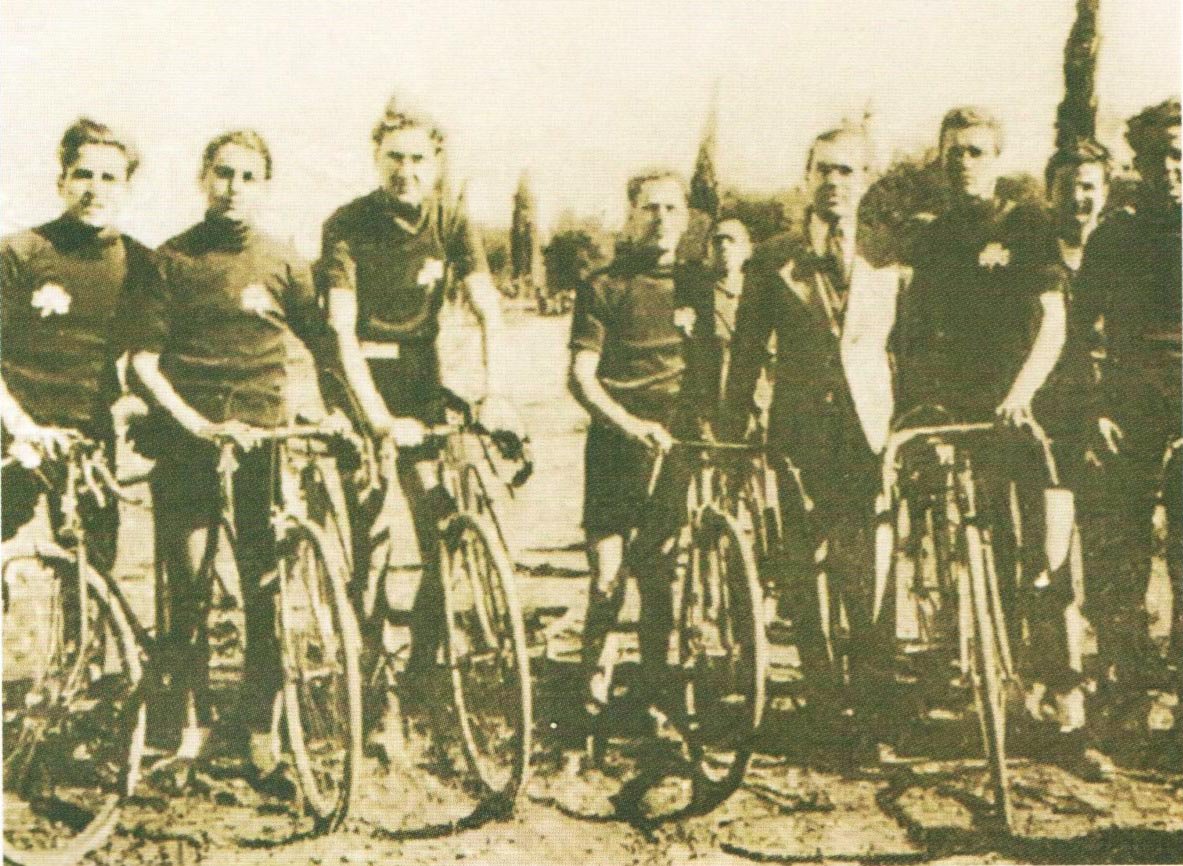
Cycling team of 1928

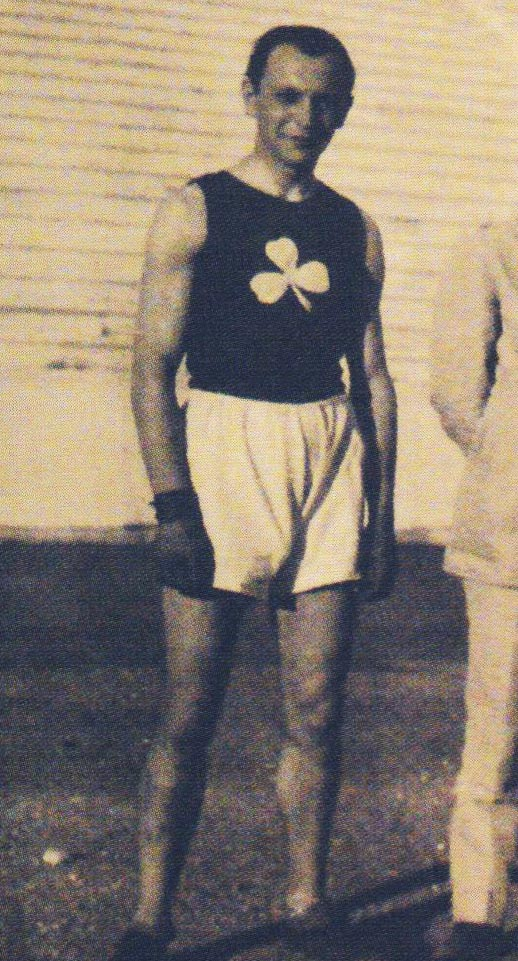
Apostolos Nikolaidis

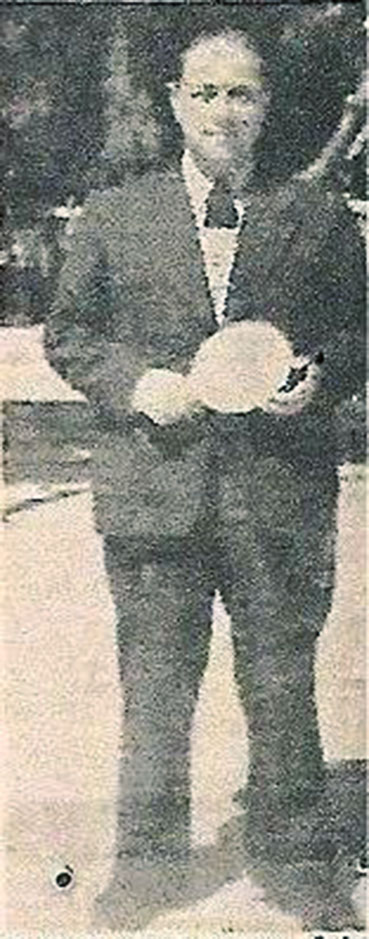
Nikos Mantzaroglou, founder of the table tennis department

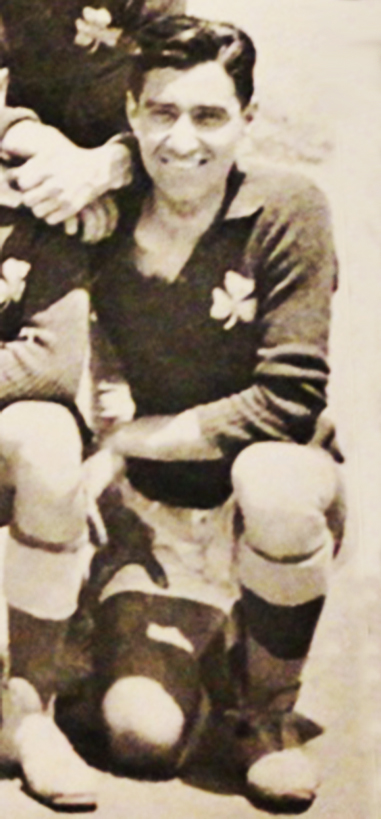
Athanasios Aravositas, founder of the shooting department

Nery Mantey Niangkouara

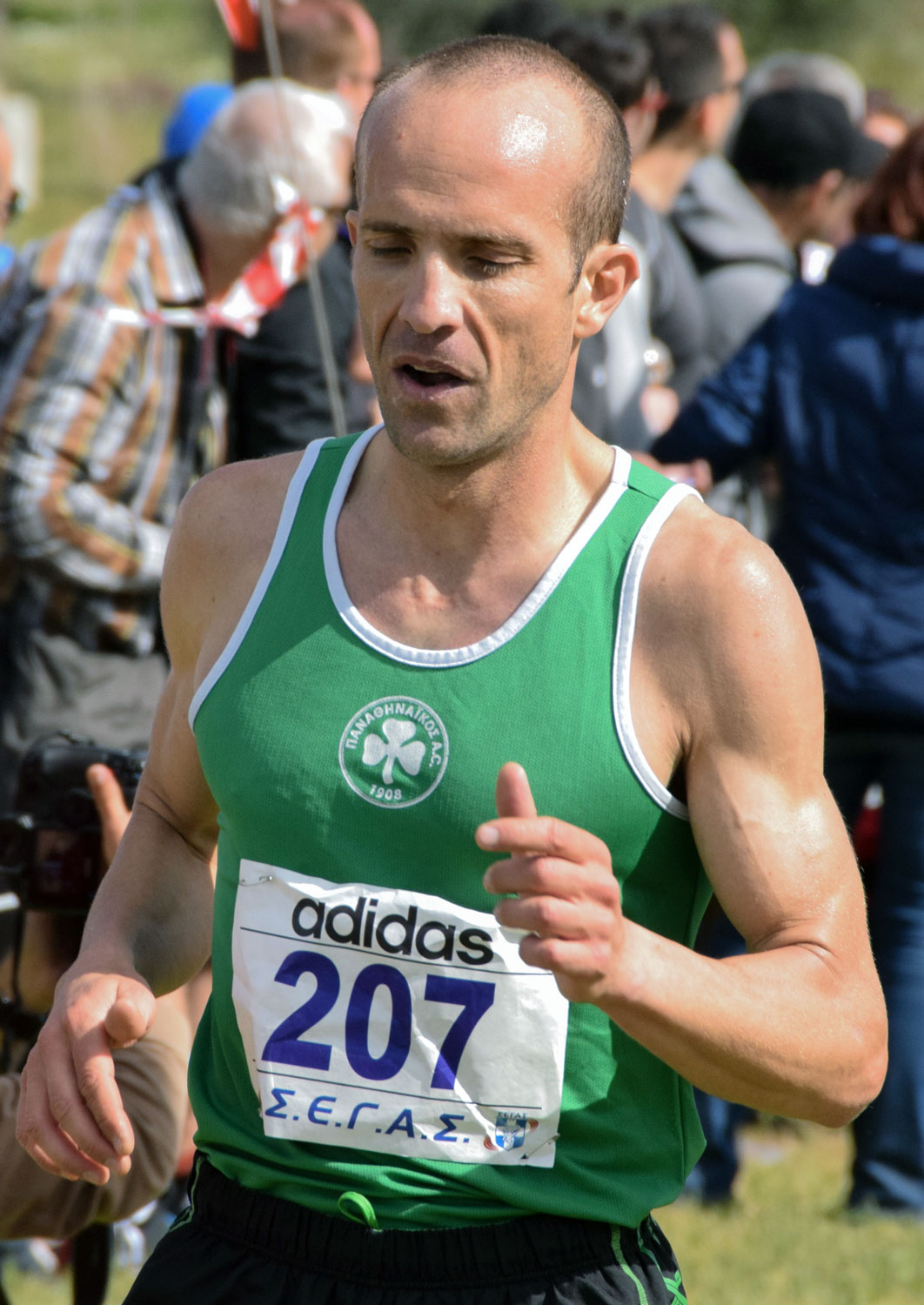
Konstantinos Poulios

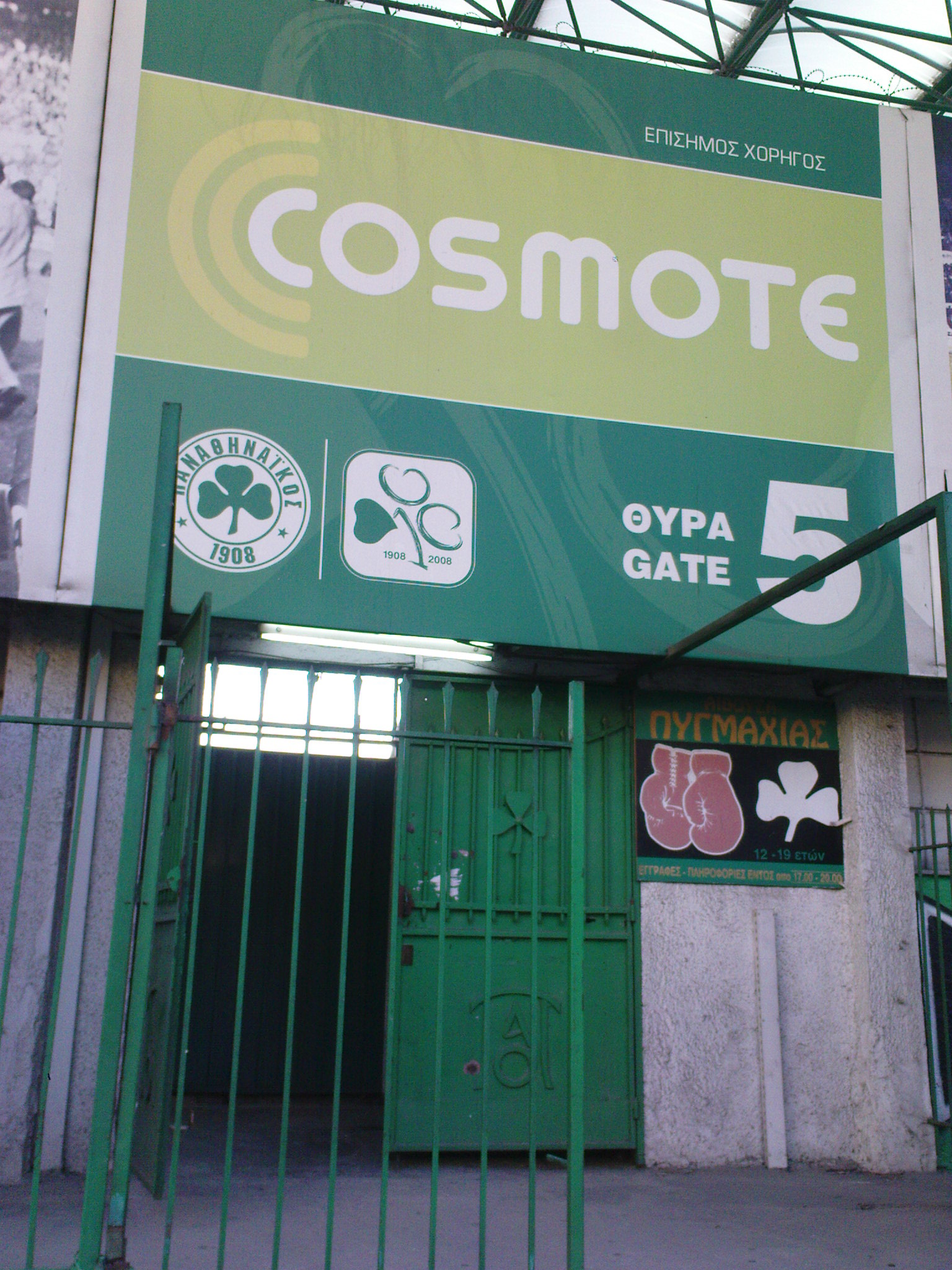
Entrance to the boxing department in Leoforos Alexandras Stadium

== See also ==
- List of Panathinaikos AO presidents
- List of Panathinaikos F.C. presidents
- Sport in Greece
