= 2008 Gomelsky Cup =

2008 Gomelsky Cup was a basketball competition in Europe that occurred in Moscow between September 22, 2008 and September 24, 2008. Four top teams from Euroleague participated in this tournament - CSKA Moscow, Maccabi Tel Aviv, Panathinaikos Athens and Žalgiris Kaunas. Žalgiris Kaunas took the gold, in the end.

== Tournament ==
=== Semifinal 1 ===
22 September

| CSKA Moscow (Russia) | 81–83 | (Lithuania) Žalgiris Kaunas |
Scoring by quarter: 17-14, 19-17, 17-22, 28-30

=== Semifinal 2 ===
22 September

| Panathinaikos Athens (Greece) | 100–96 (OT) | (Israel) Maccabi Tel Aviv |

=== Gold-medal match ===
24 September

| Žalgiris Kaunas (Lithuania) | 80–69 | (Greece) Panathinaikos Athens |
Scoring by quarter: 24-23, 14-18, 22-17, 20-11

=== Bronze-medal match ===
24 September

| CSKA Moscow (Russia) | 76–59 | (Israel) Maccabi Tel Aviv |
Scoring by quarter: 21-20, 16-22, 26-7, 13-10
