= Giorgos Kalafatis =

Greek footballer (1890–1964)

Giorgios Kalafatis
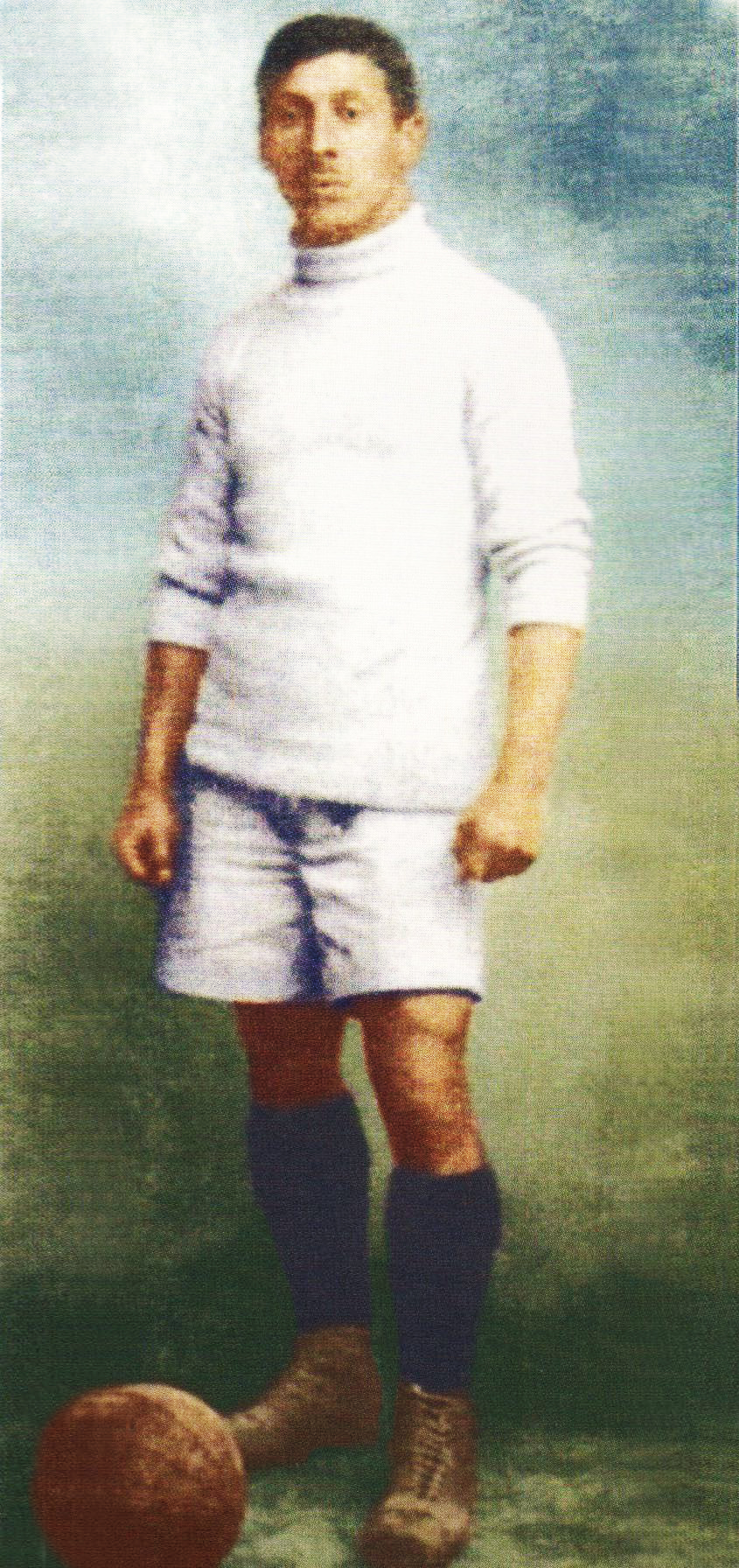

Personal information
- Full name: Georgios Kalafatis
- Date of birth: 17 March 1890
- Place of birth: Exarchia, Greece
- Date of death: 19 February 1964 (aged 73)
- Place of death: Athens, Greece

Senior career*
Years	Team	Apps	(Gls)
1905–1906	Ethnikos G.S.		
1906–1907	Panellinios G.S.		
1908–1923	Panathinaikos		

International career
1919–1920	Greece	1	(0)

Managerial career
- 1914–1916: Panathinaikos
- 1917–1923: Panathinaikos
- 1920: Greece
- * Club domestic league appearances and goals

Giorgos Kalafatis (Greek: Γιώργος Καλαφάτης; 17 March 1890 – 19 February 1964) was a Greek football pioneer, player, coach, track and field athlete and the founder of Panathinaikos Athens multi-sports club.

== Sports career ==
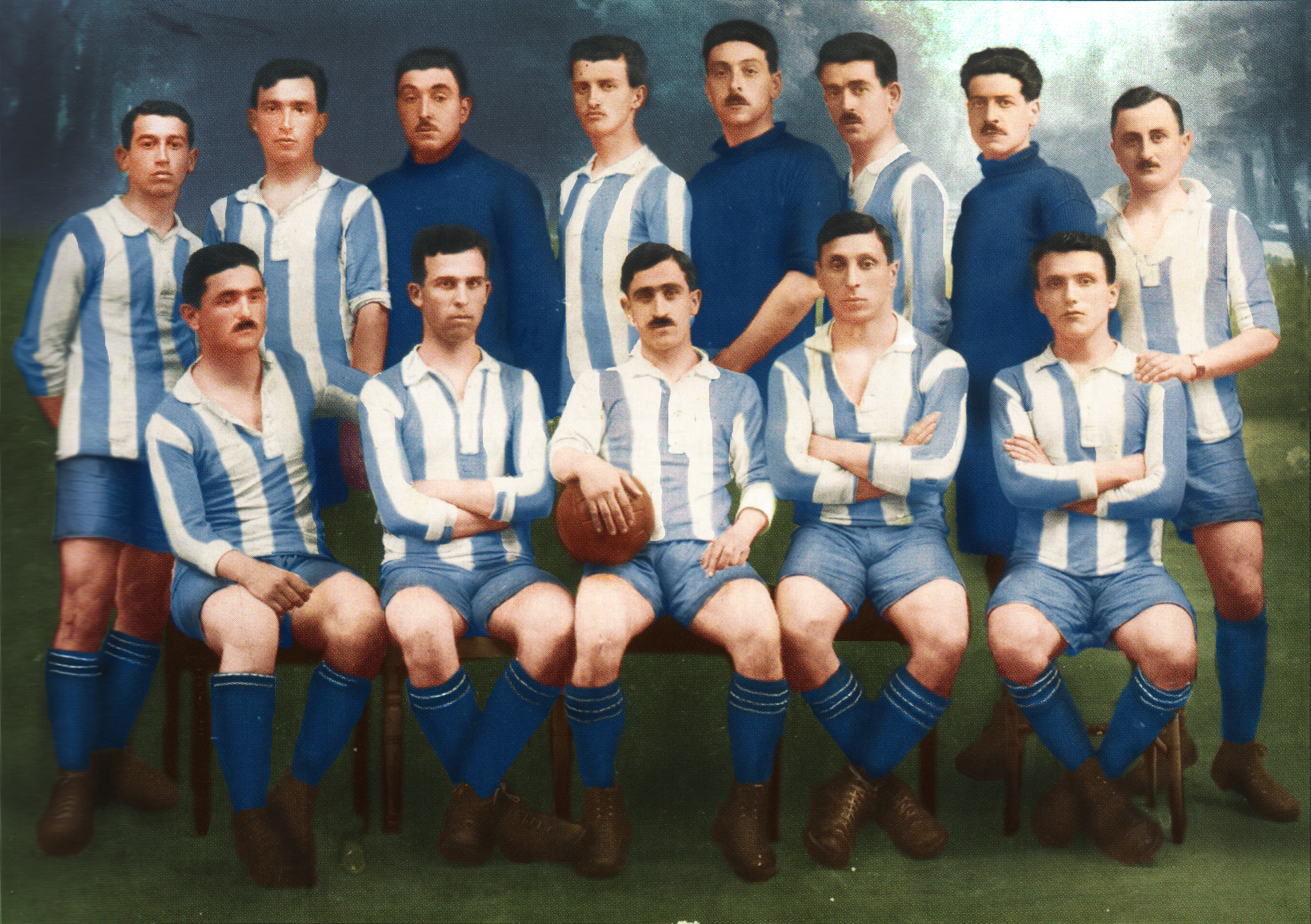
The Greece national team for the Inter-Allied Games in Paris, 1919. Kalafatis is seated, second from right.

Being a big athletic talent, he distinguished himself in track and field sports. But football was his big passion. He played for Ethnikos G.S. Athens and when his later club Panellinios decided to discontinue its football team, Kalafatis together with 40 other athletes broke away and established in February 1908 the first team of Panathinaikos, named Podosfairikos Omilos Athinon (Football Club of Athens). Kalafatis appointed the Englishman John Cyril Campbell as coach for the new team. It was the first time that a foreigner was appointed as the coach of a Greek team.

Apart from Giorgos Kalafatis, other establishing members of POA were: his brother Alexandros, who was the first president, Emmanouel Chrysis, Dimitris Doukakis, Periklis Mpoumpoulis, Vasileios Granitsas, Mantzakos, Papageorgiou, Gaetas, Demertzis, Stavropoulos, Paschos, Misakian, Reppas, Sapounias and Garoufalias.

In 1919, he was a member of the Greece national team for the Inter-Allied Games in Paris. In Paris, Kalafatis collected information about basketball and volleyball (sports unknown then in Greece) and after his return to Athens, started his efforts on creating new teams with Panathinaikos. He was a player/manager in the Greece national team for the 1920 Olympic Games in Antwerp. His older brother, Alexandros, was selected for the unofficial Greece national team that played in the 1906 Summer Olympics in Athens, starting in both games which ended in 1–5 and 0–9 losses.

Kalafatis played football until the early 1920s. After he retired, he remained in Panathinaikos as an official.

== Personal life ==
He was born in Exarcheia, Athens, which was a few hundred meters away from Leoforos Alexandras Stadium. The family of Kalafatis was from Dilinata, a village in the island of Cephalonia. While being an athlete, he graduated also from the Health Department of the National and Kapodistrian University of Athens. He pursued a career in the Hellenic Navy, taking part in the Balkan Wars and in World War I and reaching up to the rank of rear admiral.

He died on 19 February 1964.
