= Michalis Papazoglou =

Greek athlete

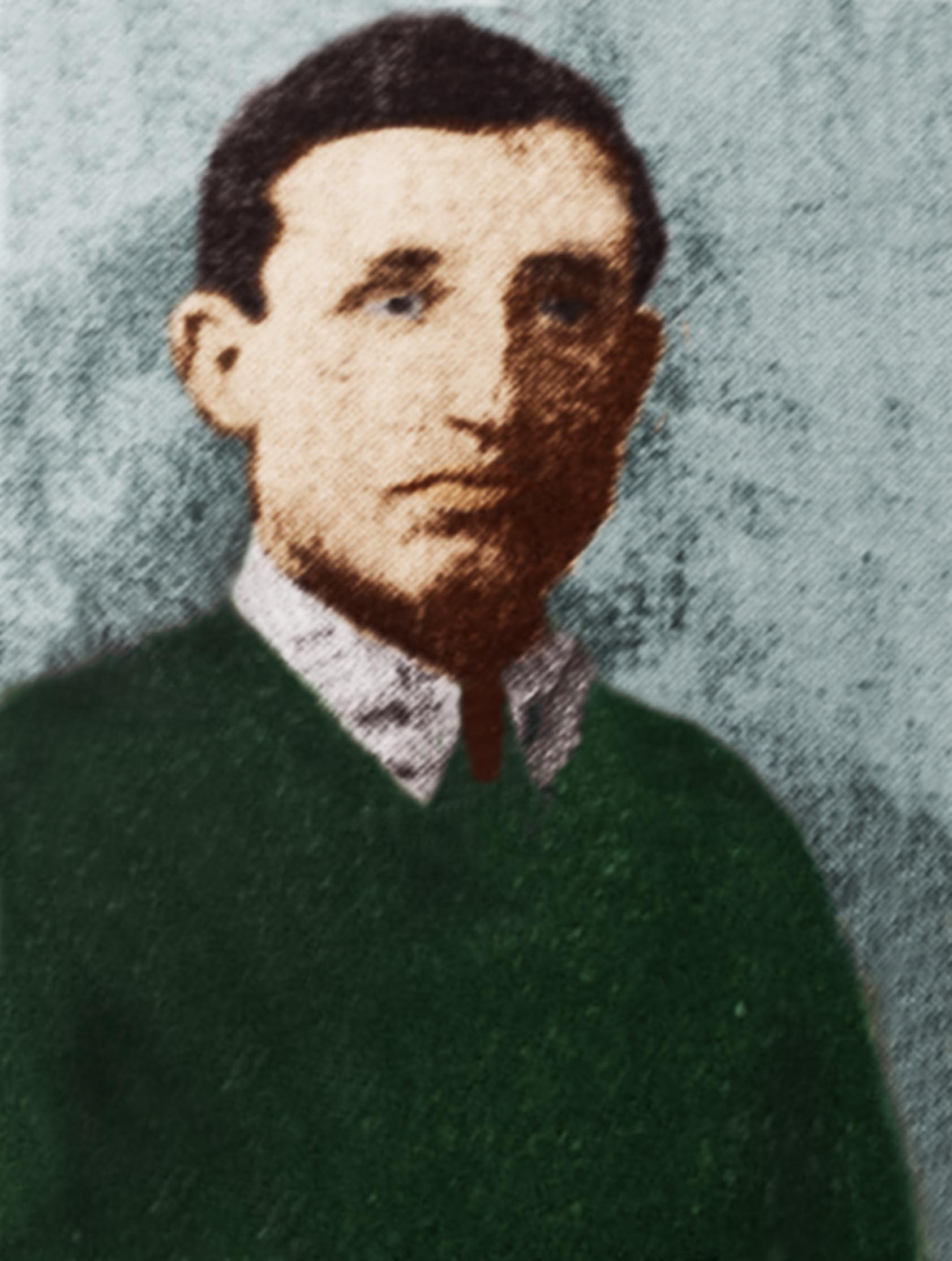
- Michalis Papazoglou with a Panathinaikos shirt

Personal information
- Date of birth: 1892
- Place of birth: Kadıköy, Constantinople, Ottoman Empire
- Date of death: 1960 (aged 67–68)
- Place of death: Athens, Greece
- Positions: Attacking midfielder; striker

Youth career
- Cadi-Keuy F.C.

Senior career*
Years	Team	Apps	(Gls)
1912-19	Panathinaikos		
- * Club domestic league appearances and goals

Michalis Papazoglou was a Greek athlete from Constantinople. He started with track and field sports but when he came to Athens in the early 1910s, he joined the football club PPO (later to become PAO). He is considered the man who had the idea of adopting the trefoil as the official emblem of Panathinaikos. Beside football, he was also an athlete of discus throw and javelin throw.

Papazoglou was also a great figure in the National Resistance during World War II. He joined the resistance group of Jerzy Iwanow-Szajnowicz – an athlete of Polish origin of Iraklis Thessaloniki. The group's mission was to give information to the British and to organize sabotages. With some external help from the naval base, the group succeeded in destroying three German airplanes and sinking three small warships. He was arrested on 12 October 1942 and was transferred to the Averof Prison. He was tortured but finally managed to escape in September 1944.

After the war he served in various roles in Panathinaikos.
