= Panathinaikos Field Hockey =

Panathinaikos
- Nickname(s): The Trifolium
- Founded: 1927, 2014 (refoundation)
- Home ground: Hellinikon Olympic Hockey Centre

Panathinaikos AC Field Hockey department was refounded in 2014.

== History ==
The field hockey department of Panathinaikos was one of the first in Greece. It was founded in 1927, while there was not a Greek league. The team was forced to play abroad against foreign teams. The first athletes of the team were Cypriots or athletes from the other departments of the club. Main contributors were Renos Fragoudis, Diomidis Symeonidis and Athanasios Aravositas.

Some members of the first team were Angelos Filippou, Nikos Mantzaroglou (the table tennis athlete), Renos Fragoudis, Athanasios Aravositas, Chrisanthos Tsoukalas, Kleon Zachos, Kimon Zachos, Nikos Chrisafis, Lefteris Frantzeskakis, Angelos Messaris and Diomidis Symeonidis.

After World War Two, the department stopped its action. It was refounded in 2014.
