= Athanasios Aravositas =

Greek sports shooter and athlete

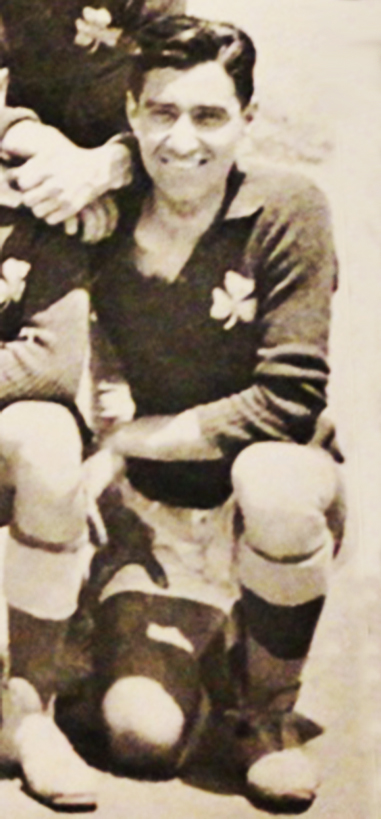
- Aravositas in 1927

Personal information
- Born: 1903
- Died: 1971 (aged 67–68)

Sport
- Sport: Sports shooting

Athanasios Aravositas (Greek: Αθανάσιος Αραβοσιτάς; 1903–1971) was a Greek sports shooter, football player and athlete of Panathinaikos A.O. He competed at the 1936, 1948 and 1952 Summer Olympics.

He was the founder of shooting department of Panathinaikos and one of the founders of the field hockey department of Panathinaikos. He also played football for Panathinaikos and he won two championships of Athens with Panathinaikos (1926, 1927).
