= Panathinaikos People with Disabilities =

Greek parasports team

Panathinaikos PwD
- Full name: Panathinaikos People with Disabilities
- Divisions: Wheelchair basketball Wheelchair fencing shooting Para sport Para swimming Paralympic archery Para table tennis Para-cycling; Paralympic powerlifting Amputee football Paratriathlon; Para-badminton; Wheelchair tennis Boccia; Para athletics Blind chess Paracanoe; Wheelchair DanceSport; Paralympic Judo; Para-alpine skiing] Sitting volleyball
- Founded: 3 December 2018 (7 years, 199 days old)
- Based in: Athens, Greece
- Colours: Green, white
- President: Dimitris Vranopoulos
- Manager: -
- Parent group: Panathinaikos A.O.
- Website: paoamea.gr

This entry refers to the Parasports Division of Panathinaikos
For all the departments of the club see the main article Panathinaikos A.O.

Panathinaikos Athletic Club People with Disabilities is the parasports department of the Greek sports club Panathinaikos, established on 3 December 2018. Its aim is to enable people with disabilities to compete in sports.

== Departments ==
Panathinaikos Athletic Club People with Disabilities has established so far 24 departments for an equivalent number of parasports, with most of them (18) currently included in the Paralympic Games programme, with the exception of amputee football, blind chess, wheelchair dancesport, basketball ID and the sports for athletes who are transplant recipients or undergo kindey dialysis.

Sport	Establishment
Wheelchair basketball	3 December 2018
Wheelchair fencing	10 April 2019
Shooting Para sport	14 May 2019
Para swimming	4 July 2019
Paralympic archery	18 September 2019
Para table tennis	14 December 2019
Para-cycling	27 December 2019
Paralympic powerlifting	20 January 2020
Amputee football	24 July 2020
Paratriathlon	27 October 2020
Para-badminton	31 December 2020
Wheelchair tennis	2 January 2021
Boccia	3 January 2021
Para athletics	4 January 2021
Blind chess	4 January 2021
Paracanoe	16 October 2021
Wheelchair DanceSport	19 October 2021
Basketball ID	30 August 2022
Paralympic Judo	27 January 2023
Para-alpine skiing	15 February 2023
Sitting volleyball	14 June 2023
Bowling (transplant & dialysis)	9 December 2023
Athletics (transplant & dialysis)	4 April 2024
Goalball	29 April 2024

== Wheelchair basketball ==
=== Roster ===
As of 20 February 2023

No.	Player	Position
5	(Greece) Yorgos Tsaousidis	
6	(Greece) Petros Tsikouras	
10	(Greece) Panagiotis Triantafyllou	Point guard
12	(Greece) Vasilios Toumaras	Power forward
13	(Greece) Hristos Martsakis	Power forward
14	(Greece) Spiridon Spathis	
15	(Greece) Maria Mihalopoulou	
19	(Greece) Nikos Fitros	
20	(Colombia) Nelson Jaime Sanz Londoño	Power forward
33	(Greece) Panayotis Kontoyannis	Shooting guard
34	(Greece) Ioanna Hronopoulou (ab)	Center
	(Sweden) Besitun Hadi Ahmed	
	(Greece) Stavros Ditsis	
	(Greece) Panayotis Hristoforos	
	(Greece) Konstantinos Katopodis	
	(Greece) Pavlos Mamalos	
	(Greece) Themis Yannakaras	
	(Greece) Nikos Pappas (ab)	

- (ab) able-bodied

=== Honours ===
- Greek League (A1)

Winners (2) : 2021–22, 2023-24

- Greek Cup

Winners (2) : 2021–22, 2023-24

- Super Cup

Winners (1) : 2022

=== Season by season ===
Season	Tier	League	Pos	Cup
2018–19	2	A2	2nd	Quarter-finalist
2019–20	1	A1	Season not completed due to COVID-19	
2020–21	1	A1	Season not completed due to COVID-19	
2021–22	1	A1	1st	Winner
2022–23	1	A1	3rd	Quarter-finalist
2023–24	1	A1	1st	Winner

== Wheelchair Fencing ==
=== Honours ===
- 4 Greek Championships Men and Women: 2021, 2022, 2023, 2024

== Amputee Football ==
=== Honours ===
- 1 Greek Developmental Cup: 2021
- 1 (1st) Greek Championship: 2022

== Para-cycling ==
=== Honours ===
- 1 Greek Championship of Para-Cycling Track: 2021
- 1 Greek Championship of Para-Cycling Endurance Road: 2024
