= Haralambos Symeonidis =

Greek Hispanist and linguist

Haralambos Symeonidis (Greek: Χαράλαμπος Συμεωνίδης, born 1968) is a Greek Hispanist and linguist.

== Career ==
A linguist focused on Ibero-Romance languages, Symeonidis is devoted to interactions between languages, particularly Spanish, Portuguese, and Guaraní, as well as Judeo-Spanish. His research covers language contact, bilingualism, and linguistic policies in Latin America, with a specific emphasis on the Guaranitic area. He is professor at the Department of Hispanic Studies, University of Kentucky. He also lectures at the Middlebury Language School.

== Selected works ==
- 2010: Ετυμολογικό Λεξικό των Νεοελληνικών Οικωνυμίων, (Κέντρο Μελετών Ιεράς Μονής Κύκκου).
- 2009: Guarani-Romanic Linguistic Atlas
- 2002: Das Judenspanische von Thessaloniki: Beschreibung des Sephardischen im griechischen Umfeld (in German). Peter Lang.
- 1992: Εισαγωγή στην Ελληνική Ονοματολογία [Introduction to Greek Onomastics], Thessaloniki (Αφοί Κυριακίδη).
