= John Cyril Campbell =

English athlete and football coach

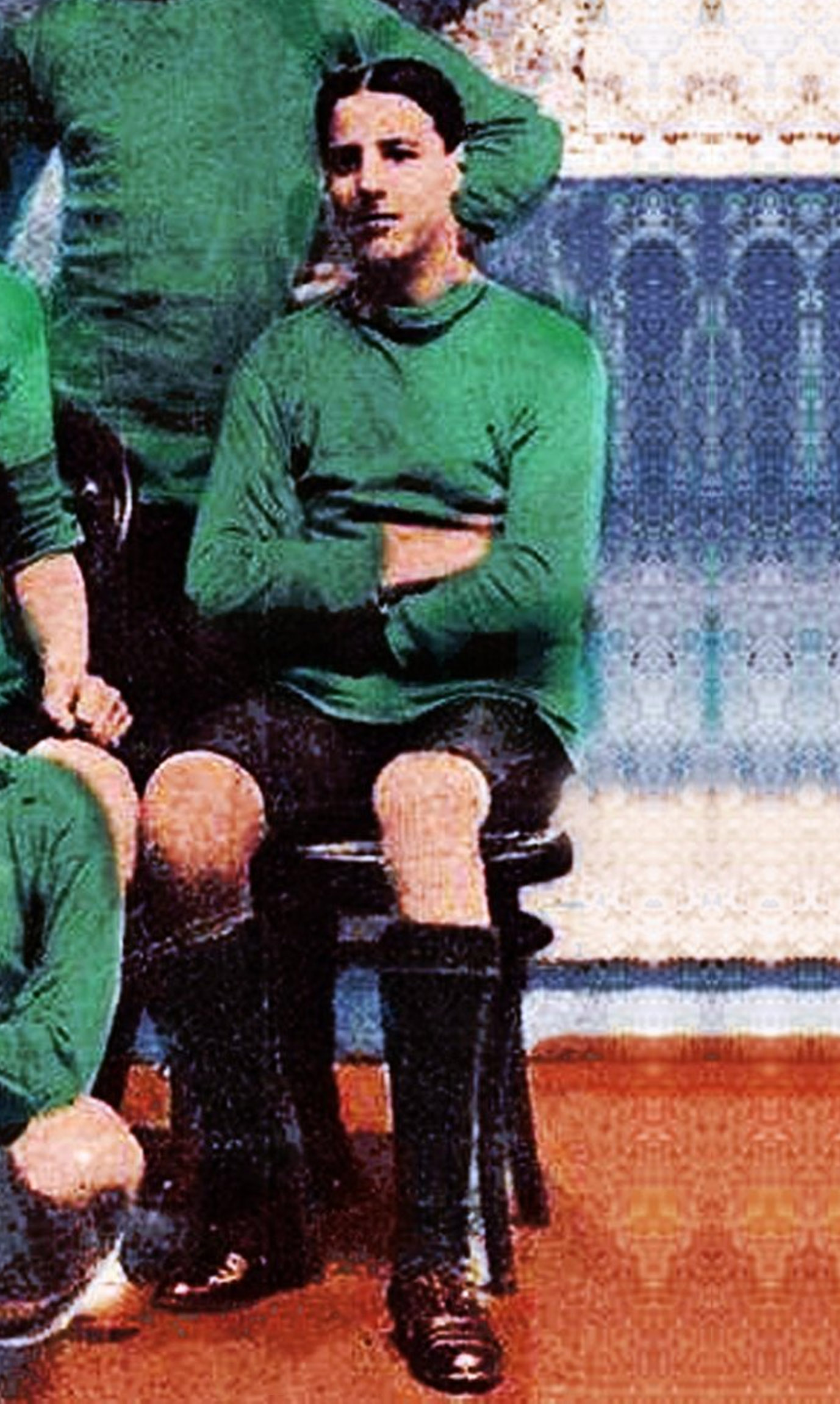
- Occupations: Athlete, football coach

John Cyril Campbell was an English athlete and football coach, the first of Panathinaikos (at that time Podosfairikos Omilos Athinon - Football Club of Athens).

He settled in Athens where he managed an English fashion house.

After a serious accident, he returned to England in 1914.
