= Diomidis Symeonidis =

Cypriot footballer (1908–1981)

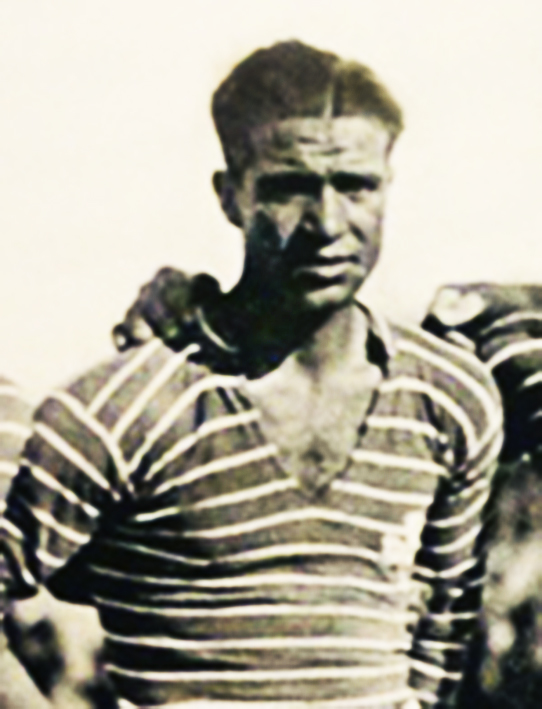

Personal information
- Date of birth: 1908
- Place of birth: Nicosia, Cyprus
- Date of death: 24 April 1981 (aged 72–73)
- Position: Midfielder

Youth career
- Panergatikos

Senior career*
Years	Team	Apps	(Gls)
1924–1926	Aetos		
1926–1929	POEL		
1929–1934	Panathinaikos		
1934–1935	Enosis Neon Trust		

International career
1930–1932	Greece	5	(0)
- * Club domestic league appearances and goals

Diomidis Symeonidis (1908 – 24 April 1981) was a Cypriot footballer, and one of the founders of APOEL.

Symeonidis was born in 1908 and was, along with his brother Christos, a footballer of Aetos - a local Nicosia club - until 1926 when he met Georgios Poulias. The two men founded POEL which evolved into APOEL. Symeonidis played for the team he co-founded until 1929 when he transferred to Panathinaikos in the Greek League. His career at PAO ended in 1934 due to an injury and Symeonidis returned to Cyprus where he was player/coach for APOEL and for Enosis Neon Trust.

He won one greek championship (1930) and one cypriot championship (1935).

During his career, Symeonidis was capped five times by the Greece national team. He died in 1981 in his late 70s.
