= Elaeus (disambiguation) =

Elaeus is an ancient city of Thrace, now in Turkey.

Elaeus or Elaious (Ancient Greek: Ἔλαιοῦς) may also refer to:

- Elaeus (Aetolia), a town of ancient Aetolia, Greece
- Elaeus (Argolis), a town of ancient Argolis, Greece
- Elaeus (Attica), a deme of ancient Attica, Greece
- Elaeus (Bithynia), a town of ancient Bithynia, in Asia Minor
- Elaeus (Caria), a town of ancient Caria, in Asia Minor
- Elaeus (Epirus), a town of ancient Epirus, Greece
- Elaeus (Naxos), a town of ancient Naxos, Greece
