= Mela (disambiguation) =

Mela is used in the Indian subcontinent for all sizes of gatherings: religious, commercial, cultural or sport-related.

Mela may also refer to:

== Arts and entertainment ==
- Mela (1948 film), an Indian romantic tragedy film
- Mela (1971 film), an Indian family drama film
- Mela (1980 film), an Indian Malayalam-language film by K. G. George
- Mela (1986 film), a Pakistani action film
- Mela (2000 film), an Indian action film
- Mela (Ugandan TV series), 2018
- "Mela!", 2020 song by Ryokuoushoku Shakai

== People ==
- Mela (surname)
- Mela (Miller), an early settler in Hawaii
- Mela Lee, (born 1976), an American voice actress
- Pomponius Mela (died c. AD 45), a Roman geographer

== Places ==
- Mela, Corse-du-Sud, Corsica, France
- Mela (Bithynia), a city in the Roman province of Bithynia Secunda

== Other uses ==
- Mela (company), a global entertainment consumer service
- MELA Sciences, an American medical device company
- MELA (Mothers of East Los Angeles), an American anti-prison construction group
- MeLA, an Italian people mover located in Milan
- Melakarta, or Mela, a collection of fundamental musical scales (ragas) in Carnatic music

== See also ==
- Melas (disambiguation)
- Carmela, a given name
