= Carmela =

Carmela is a female given name. Notable people with the name include:

== People ==
- Carmela Abraham American neuroscientist
- Carmela Allucci (born 22 January 1970 in Naples), Italian water polo midfielder
- Carmela Appel (born 1996), Dutch cricketer
- Carmela Auriemma (born 1981), Italian politician
- Carmela Cardama Báez (born 1996), Spanish long-distance runner
- Carmela Bolívar (born 1957), retired Peruvian sprinter
- Carmela Bucalo, Italian politician
- Carmela Carabelli (1910-1978), spiritual daughter of Pio of Pietrelcina; Italian mystic
- Carmela Carvajal (1851-1931), wife of the Chilean navy captain Arturo Prat
- Carmela Cipriani (born 1996), Italian racing cyclist
- Carmela Combe (1898-1984), Peruvian aviator
- Carmela Corren (1938-2022), Israeli singer and actress
- Carmela Marie Cristiano (1927-2011), American Catholic religious sister
- Carmela Grippa, Italian politician
- Carmela Gross (born 1946), Brazilian visual artist and educator
- Carmela Gutiérrez de Gambra (1921-1984), Spanish scholar, translator, and romance novelist
- Carmela Jeria Gómez (1886 – ?), labor activist, typographer, publisher
- Carmela Mackenna (1879–1962), Chilean pianist and composer
- Carmela Menashe (born 1949), Israeli journalist
- Carmela Remigio (born 1973), Italian operatic soprano
- Carmela Rey (1931-2018), Mexican singer and actress
- Carmela Schlegel (born 1983), former Swiss swimmer
- Carmela Shamir, Israeli ambassador to Uzbekistan
- Carmela Teoli (1897–c. 1970), Italian-American mill worker
- Carmela Toso (1912-2002), Italian gymnast
- Carmela Troncoso (born 1982 Vigo), Spanish telecommunication engineer and researcher
- Carmela Tunay, Filipina former volleyball player, actress, and TV host
- Carmela Zumbado (born 1991), American actress

== Fictional characters ==
- Carmela Corleone, the wife of Don Vito Corleone in the books and movies based on Mario Puzo's novel, The Godfather (1969)
- Carmela Soprano, leading female character on HBO's series, The Sopranos
- Cousin Carmela, a character from Wizards of Waverly Place and its TV special The Wizards Return: Alex vs. Alex

== Other uses ==
- ¡Ay Carmela!, 1990 Spanish comedy-drama film directed by Carlos Saura and based on the eponymous play by José Sanchís Sinisterra
- ¡Ay Carmela! (play), 1987 play by José Sanchis Sinisterra
- ¡Ay Carmela! (song), one of the most famous songs of the Spanish Republican troops during the Spanish Civil War
- Carmela (film), 1942 Italian drama film directed by Flavio Calzavara
- Carmela: Ang Pinakamagandang Babae sa Mundong Ibabaw, 2014 Philippine television drama romance
- Carmela y Rafael, Mexican bolero duet
- Oscarella carmela, commonly known as the slime sponge, is a species of sponge in the order Homosclerophorida

== See also ==
- Carmella
- Carmen (given name)
