= Melas =

Melas may refer to:

== People ==
- Melas (surname)
- Melas (mythology), a number of different characters in Greek mythology
- Melas, an Ancient Greek first name. Its most notable holders were Melas the Elder and Younger, two rulers of Ephesus whose dynasty intermarried with the Mermnad dynasty of Lydia.
- The name of a Greco-Egyptian bishop of Rhinocorura, venerated as a saint in some churches, who opposed Arianism in the time of Emperor Valens

== Places ==
- Melas, Kastoria, a village in Western Macedonia, Greece, formerly Statitsa, renamed for Pavlos Melas
- Pavlos Melas (municipality), in Thessaloniki, Central Macedonia, Greece
- Melas (Naxos), a town in ancient Greece
- Melas, now Manavgat River, in Turkey
- Melas Chasma, a canyon on Mars
- Gulf of Melas, the previous name of Gulf of Saros, in Turkey

== Other uses ==
- MELAS syndrome, one of the family of mitochondrial cytopathies
- Plural of mela

== See also ==
- Mela (disambiguation)
