= Jeria =

Jeria is a surname. Notable people with the surname include:

- Ángela Jeria (1926–2020), Chilean archaeologist, mother of Michelle Bachelet
- Carmela Jeria Gómez (1886–?), Chilean labor activist, typographer, and publisher
- Michelle Bachelet Jeria (born 1951), Chilean politician
- Patricio Jeria (born 1989), Chilean footballer

== See also ==
- Jeri
