= Kales (disambiguation) =

Kales is the Dutch name of Calais, France.

Kales may also refer to:

- Kales (Bithynia), a town of ancient Bithynia, now in Turkey
- Kales (Campania), a town of ancient Campania, Italy
- Kales (river), a river of ancient Asia Minor
