= Melas (surname) =

Melas is a surname, and may refer to:

- Aleksander Melås (born 1998), Norwegian luger
- Chloe Melas, American journalist
- Leon Melas (1812–1879), Greek politician
- Michael von Melas (1729–1806), Austrian General of the cavalry
- Michail Melas (1833–1897), Greek politician
- Pavlos Melas (1870–1904), Hellenic Army officer
- Vasileios Melas (1879–1956), Lieutenant General of the Hellenic army, brother of Pavlos Melas
- Zafeiris Melas (born 1952), Greek singer

== See also ==
- Mela (surname)
