= Kalles =

Kalles may refer to:

- Kalles Kaviar, a brand of Swedish caviar
- Kalles (Bithynia), a town of ancient Bithynia
- Kalles (river), a river of Asia Minor
