= Iole de Freitas =

Brazilian sculptor, engraver and installation artist

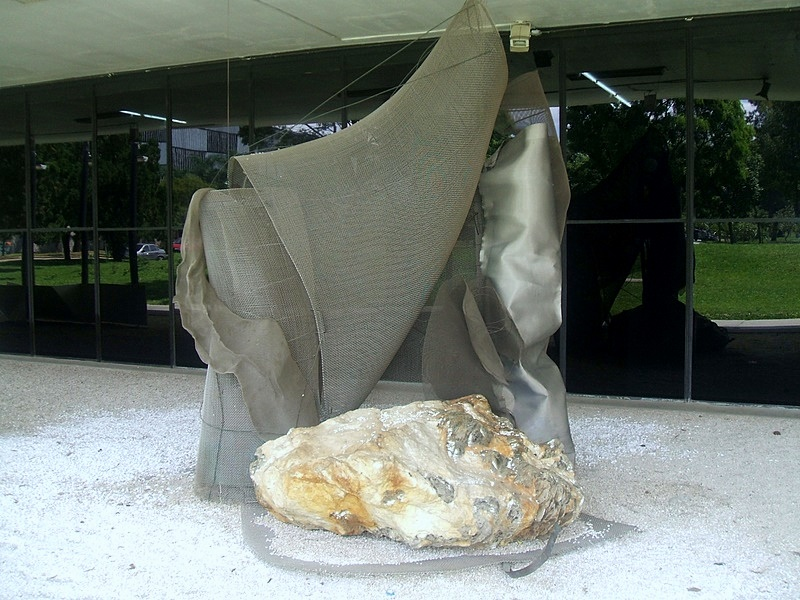
Iole de Freitas - Sem título, 1997

Iole Antunes de Freitas (born 1945) is a Brazilian sculptor, engraver, and installation artist who works in the field of contemporary art. Freitas began her career in the 1970s, participating in a group of artists in Milan, Italy linked to Body art. She used photography. In the 1980s, she returned to Brazil, but abandoned the human body as mediator of her work, adopting the "sculpture body". The artist uses materials such as wire, canvas, steel, copper, stone, and water to create her works.

== Biography ==
Iole de Freitas was born in Belo Horizonte, Minas Gerais, in 1945. She moved to Rio de Janeiro at age 7. As a child de Freitas took painting classes at the Museu de Arte Moderna do Rio de Janeiro with Ivan Serpa (1923–1973), one of the founders of the influential constructivist Grupo Frente. She studied dance from her youth into her twenties which relates to her proclaimed interest in space and movement. In the 1960s she became involved with the Ateliê de Ipanema where she learned to make copper jewelry and weave on a manual loom. There, she met artist Antonio Dias (b. 1944), who later became her husband. She studied at the Escola Superior de Desenho Industrial, from 1964 to 1965. In the 1970s, she worked in Milan as a designer at Olivetti's Corporate Image Studio under the guidance of the architect Hans von Klier. de Freitas' influences include Picasso, Cézanne, Degas, and Tatlin.

In Milan, she began to develop and exhibit her own work from 1973. During the 1960s, however, she had already produced a body of works that included photographic images, installations, and experimental films that critiqued the conceptualization of the female body and femininity by dominant representational systems. In terms of technique, her early works featured extreme proximity of the filmed or photographed object in relation to the image plane as well as the recurring image of the mirror. By reducing the distance in her photographs, she is bringing the camera into the experience as if the device is an extension of the body of the subject. Her style has been compared to the art of Carmela Gross, another Brazilian artist. This is attributed to their focus on the construction and deconstruction of the relations between things.

When de Freitas returned to Brazil, she focused on sculpture that followed the trends of the contemporary Brazilian sculpture. By 1974, her works focused on three-dimensional pieces that were made of wire, cloth, glass, and rubber.

== Work ==
The works of de Freitas can be found in several places, such as the Museum of Contemporary Art of Rio Grande do Sul, the Museum of Modern Art of Rio de Janeiro, the Museum of Modern Art of São Paulo, the National Museum of Fine Arts, and the Pampulha Art Museum.

She held individual exhibitions of photographic sequences at the Museum of Modern Art of Rio de Janeiro, whose catalog brings the text "Ontogenesis and Filogênse" by Paulo Sérgio Duarte, and also makes individual exhibition at Galerleria Ortelli in Milan, Italy.

In 1975, she participated in the IX Biennial of Paris with facilities and photographic sequence of the series Glass pieces, life slices, at the invitation of the critic Tomasso Trini. He participated in the exhibition "03 23 03 - Primières Recontres Internationals d'Arte Contemporain", in Montreal, Canada. In 1980 she created the "Almost Cinema" exhibition at the Centro Internazionale di Brera in Milan, Italy; the same show was presented in 1981 at the National Art Foundation (Funarte) in Rio de Janeiro. In 1981, she participated in the IX São Paulo Biennial. Performed in 1984, the individual exhibition of sculptures entitled "Aramões", in Arco Gallery, São Paulo. In 1986, she received the Fulbright-Capes scholarship to conduct research at the Museum of Modern Art (Moma), New York, USA. In 1990, she exhibited the first large sculptures in the individual exhibition at the Art Office Raquel Arnaud, São Paulo, where she presented a catalog with the text "Delicadeza Traumáticas" by Paulo Venâncio Filho. From 1991, she designed several sculptures for specific locations in São Paulo and Belo Horizonte.

She was invited, in 1993, as artist residing by Winnipeg Art Gallery, in Canada. In 1995, she participated in the exhibition "Cartographies", in La Caixa Space, Madrid, Spain. In 1998, she participated in important collectives: Brazilian Art in the Collection of the Museum of Modern Art of São Paulo - recent donations 1996-1998, CCBB, Rio de Janeiro; XXIV International Biennial of São Paulo, etc. In 2000, she worked as an individual at the Hélio Oiticica Art Center, in Rio de Janeiro, and in the "Brazil - 500 years" projects at the Fundação Bienal de São Paulo and Investigations: the work of the artist, at the Itaú Cultural Institute of São Paulo.

She held an individual exhibition at the Museum of Contemporary Art (MAC) in Niterói, and at the Marcus Vieira Art Gallery, Belo Horizonte. In 2005, at the V Mercosul Biennial, Porto Alegre, and also at the III Art Forum of the Americas, Belo Horizonte, where she launched the book Atelier Circuit, in his honor, a project coordinated by Fernando Pedro da Silva and Marília Andrés Ribeiro. Her works belong to the collections of MAM / Rio de Janeiro, MAM / São Paulo, MAC / Niterói, Pinacoteca do Estado de São Paulo, National Museum of Fine Arts, Rio de Janeiro, Pampulha Art Museum, Belo Horizonte, Art Museum Contemporary, Porto Alegre, and several foundations and museums from abroad. Present in the main private collections of the country and abroad.

She presented her most recent solo show in a space located in Gabinete se Arte Raquel Arnaud. This show lasted from October 25 through December 8, 2007. The title of this solo show was, "Dynamic Letters" which included two projects by this artist. One was an installation created with transparent polycarbonate, steel cable and concrete. The other was three small-format objects created with steel and nickel. These installations were previously unseen before this show.
