= Vasileios Melas =

Lieutenant General of the Hellenic army (1879–1956)

Lieutenant General Vasileios Melas
- Βασίλειος Μελάς
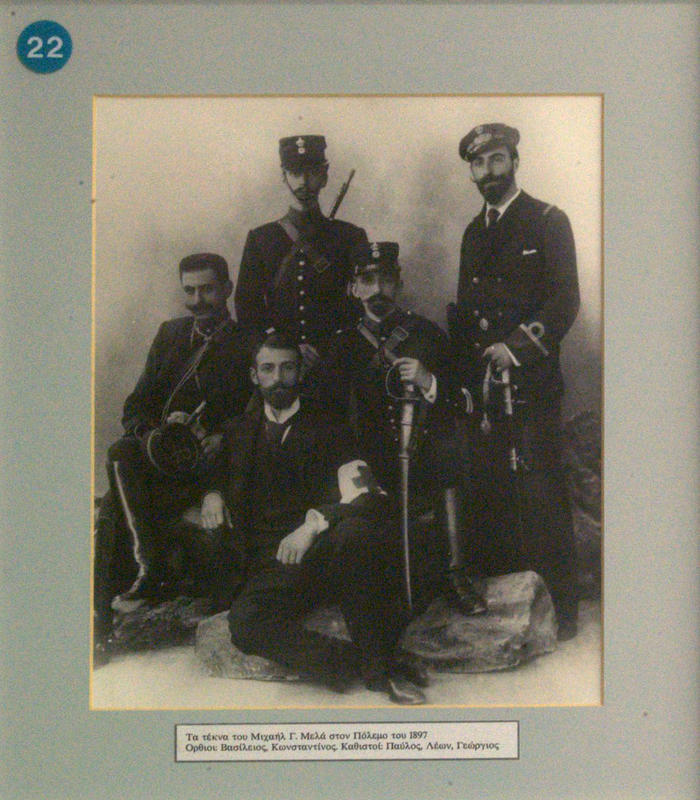
- Vasileios Melas (standing left) with his brothers c. 1897
- Born: 1874; Athens, Kingdom of Greece
- Died: 1956 (aged 81–82)
- Alma mater: Hellenic Army Academy
- Spouse: Eleni Soutsou
- Relatives: Michail Melas (father); Pavlos Melas (brother); Anna Mela-Papadopoulou (sister)
- Military career
- Allegiance: Kingdom of Greece; Second Hellenic Republic
- Branch: Hellenic Army
- Service years: 1897–1936; 1940–1941
- Rank: Lieutenant General
- Commands: Senior Military Commander of Argyrokastro
- Conflicts: Greco-Turkish War (1897); Battle of Velestino; Battle of Domokos; Balkan Wars; First Balkan War; Second Balkan War; North Epirote Struggle; Greco-Turkish War (1919-1922); World War II; Greco-Italian War; German invasion of Greece
- Other work: Adjutant to King Alexander of Greece; President of the Athenian Club; President of the Management Committee of Vasileios G. Melas; President of the Philippos Union; President of the Epirote Society of Athens

Vasileios Melas (Greek: Βασίλειος Μελάς; 1879 in Athens – 1956) was a Lieutenant General of the Hellenic army. He was Pavlos Melas' younger brother.

== Biography ==
Vasileios Melas was born in Athens and was the last of the seven children of the jurist, merchant and politician Michail Melas and Eleni G. Voutsina from Kefalonia. When he finished secondary school, Vassileios studied in the Hellenic Military Academy. At the age of 17, he discontinued his studies, joined the cavalry as a corporal and took part in the Greco-Turkish War of 1897. By the end of the war, he continued his studies and graduated from the academy with the rank of second lieutenant.

Later he continued his military studies at the Infantry and Cavalry School in Namur in Belgium and then he studied as lieutenant in the Cavalry School at Saumur (France) (1910–11). He fought in the Balkan Wars of 1912–13 and in the Northern Epirote autonomy struggle in 1914. In 1915–16, Melas studied at the Captains School. He took part in the Greco-Turkish War of 1919–22 as Commander of the Cavalry Division (1920). As colonel, he also served as adjutant of King Alexander of Greece.

From 1923 until 1925, Melas served as military attaché of Greece in Belgrade and later in Paris and London. In 1926 Melas was promoted to the rank of major general and in 1930 he became a lieutenant general.

Although, at his request, he retired in 1936. However, he took part in the Greco-Italian War, when he was appointed as senior military commander of Argyrokastro. At the end of the war, he retired. For this period of his life, he wrote the “Αναμνήσεις και εντυπώσεις αντιστρατήγου Βασ. Μιχ. Μελά από την διοίκησίν του εν Αργυροκάστρω κατά τον Ιταλικόν πόλεμον 1940-1941” (“Memories and impressions of the Lieutenant General Vas. M. Melas from his command in Argyrokastro during Italian War 1940-1941”). During his military career he was injured 3 times. Melas was honored many times for his heroism.

He participated in many associations and unions. He was also president of the Athenian Club (1938–41 and 1949–56), the Management Committee of Vasileios G. Melas, the Philippos Union and the Epirote Society of Athens, of which he was founding member. Melas was also collaborator in writing the Great Greek Encyclopedia.

After his retirement, he participated in many public welfare activities. Vasileios Melas was a mason in Skenderbeis lodge of Athens, while during the Axis occupation of Greece he was imprisoned by the German forces.

He died in 1956 in Athens. His personal archive has been deposited in the National Historical Museum of Greece. He married Eleni Soutsou, daughter of Alexandros Soutsos (General and President of the Athenian Club) and Sophia Nikolaou Mavrokordatou.

== Bibliography ==
- Pavlos Drandakis, «Μεγάλη Ελληνική Εγκυκλοπαίδεια», vol. ΙΣΤ'.
- Olga Palaiologou, Το Νηπιακόν Επιμελητήριον Μελά/ Η ίδρυση και τα πρώτα χρόνια (1893-1922), Society for Epirotic Studies, Ioannina 2011.
- Maria Papanastasiou, Αρχείο Βασιλείου Μιχαήλ Μελά, από το επιστημονικό περιοδικό Τεκμήρια Ιστορίας/Μονογραφίες, Historical and Ethnological Society of Greece, Athens 2009.
