= Mela (surname) =

Mela is a surname, and may refer to:

- Anna Mela-Papadopoulou (1871–1938), Greek nurse
- Arnaud Méla (born 1980), French rugby union player
- Aukusti Juhana Mela (1846–1904), Finnish botanist
- Francisco Mela (born 1968), Cuban drummer and percussionist
- Ghias Mela (1961–2015), Pakistani politician
- Itala Mela (1904–1957), Italian Catholic theologian
- Jan Mela (born 1988), Polish explorer
- Jaime Mela (born 1890), Spanish fencer
- Natalia Mela (1923–2019), Greek sculptor
- Usama Ghias Mela, Pakistani politician, son of Ghias Mela

== See also ==
- Melas (surname)
