= Strata Skin Sciences =

- Type: Public
- Traded as: Nasdaq: SSKN
- Founded: 1 January 1989
- Headquarters: Horsham, Pennsylvania, Pennsylvania, United States
- Website: strataskinsciences.com

Strata Skin Sciences (formerly MELA Sciences, Inc.) is an American medical device company focused on the design, development and commercialization of non-invasive tools to provide additional information to dermatologists during melanoma skin examinations.

The company's flagship product, XTRAC, is a medical device that allows for a trained dermatologist to treat skin conditions like Vitiligo and Psoriasis with monochromatic UV Light. Following completion of a successful conformity assessment procedure, Strata Skin Sciences has also been granted CE Mark approval for sale of MelaFind in the European Union.

In July 2015, the company acquired PhotoMedex Inc. and is planning to relocate its headquarters from Irvington, New York to Horsham, Pennsylvania in Montgomery County.
