= Cales (river) =

River of ancient Bithynia

Coordinates: 41°10′43″N 31°22′55″E

Cales or Kales (Ancient Greek: Κάλης), also Calles or Kalles (Κάλλης), was a river of ancient Bithynia. At its mouth was the town of Cales, located 120 stadia east of Elaeus. This seems to be the river which Thucydides calls Calex (Κάληξ), at the mouth of which Lamachus lost his ships, which were anchored there, owing to a sudden rise of the river. Thucydides places the Calex in the Heracleotis, which agrees very well with the position of the Cales. Lamachus and his troops were compelled to walk along the coast to Chalcedon. Pliny the Elder mentions a river Alces in Bithynia, which it has been conjectured, may be a corruption of Calex.

It is identified with the modern Alaplı Su in Asiatic Turkey.
