= Esther Valdés de Díaz =

South American labor leader, publisher, editor and feminist

Esther Valdés (fl. 1897–1908), also known as Esther Valdés de Díaz, was a South American labor leader, publisher, editor and feminist. She was the founder of La Palanca, a feminist worker newspaper published in Santiago, Chile, in 1908. Her dates of birth and death are unknown.

== Biography ==
Valdés worked as a seamstress from 1897 making bodices in a garment sweatshop in Santiago.

In 1905 she her began to assist labor societies and centers and began to emerge as leader of the Seamstresses guild. She demanded regulation of working hours, an end to night work, Sunday's off, and just wages. Her fight was aimed at improving salaries and obtaining medical or unemployment insurance for workers and denouncing the typical working hours of 14 hours a day, seven days of the week.

Soon she was named president of the Association of Seamstresses "Protection, Savings and Defense", which had its first session on June 1, 1906, registering hundreds of members. It was said of her that she was "a dignified and enlightened lady (...) one of the outstanding intellectuals with whom the working class is honored."

Valdés also participated as part of the editorial team of the bi-monthly newspaper La Alborada (in English: The Dawn), founded by her friend Carmela Jeria, which was published between November 1904 and August 1906 in Valparaíso, Chile, and from November 1906 until May 1907 in Santiago. Publication ended shortly after Jeria addressed a May Day gathering of 40,000 people, apparently causing her to lose her job as a typographer and suffer several personal tragedies (all documented by Valdés in her first 1908 editorial).

After La Alborada ceased publication, Valdés founded her own workers' newspaper La Palanca (in English: The Lever) in 1908 in Santiago announcing that it would continue the work of Jeria's now-defunct paper. La Palanca was launched as a champion of feminism and official voice of the Association of Seamstresses. Valdes denounced the precarious working conditions of Chilean women using her printed platform, beginning with her first editorial on May 1, 1908:

"Here we are in front of the enemy. Years of vilification and ignominy have weighed on the noble personality of women. Even today, in the middle of the twentieth century, the enormous mass of prejudices weighs on the weak shoulders of women, attached with strong chains to the post of the current prevailing society. The man after a long and arduous struggle has moderately conquered his freedoms—but the woman has been left behind in the path of progress, and of human evolution, disoriented and alone—rejected by the selfishness of man—today she silently struggles, to get rid of the chains that oppress her, and chase away the ghost that hides the light of truth and justice."

La Palanca ceased publication later that year and Esther's labor work after that remains unknown. Despite her short tenure in labor leadership roles, Esther Valdés is remembered for her fight for women's rights to decent work.
