= Pavlos Melas Museum =

- Μουσείο Παύλου Μελά
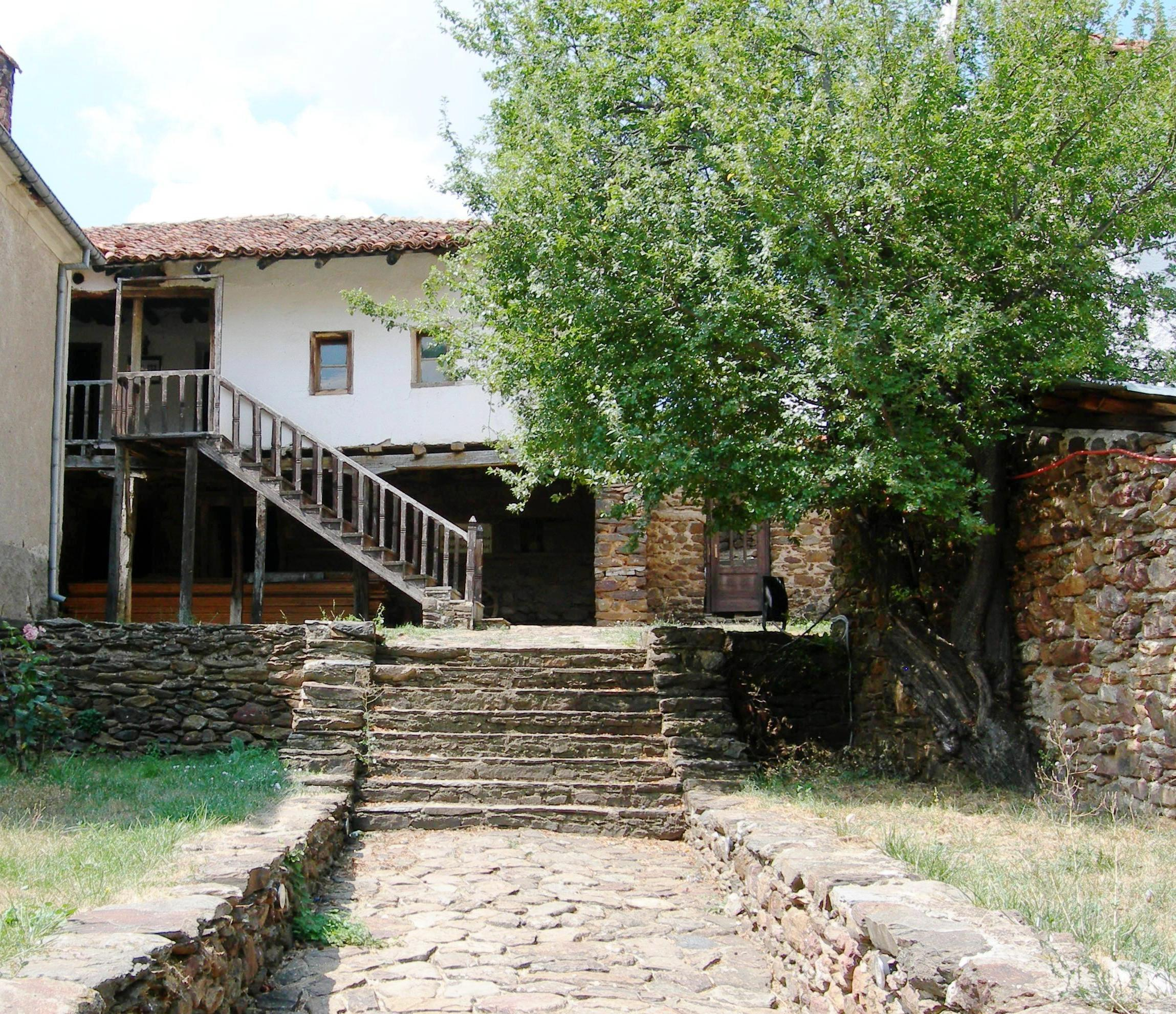
- Outside view
- Established: 1970s
- Location: Melas, Macedonia, Greece
- Coordinates: 40.70383473894858°N 21.26487001817638°E
- Type: Military museum

The Pavlos Melas Museum is located in the village of Melas, in the north part of the regional unit of Kastoria, Macedonia, Greece.

== Description ==
The building belonged to the Kantzakis family, from whom the Prefecture of Kastoria purchased it. The museum was inaugurated in the early 1970s and operates today with the support of the "Friends of the Museum of the Macedonian Struggle" and cooperating women's associations. It is a historic monument because Pavlos Melas, the hero of the Greek Struggle for Macedonia, was killed in it on 13 October 1904 during a clash with the Ottoman army. The visitor can also see traditional objects that belonged to the Kantzakis family, as well as weapons from the period of the struggle. Also exhibited are clothing and photographs of fighters from the Florina and Kastoria regions.

== Gallery ==
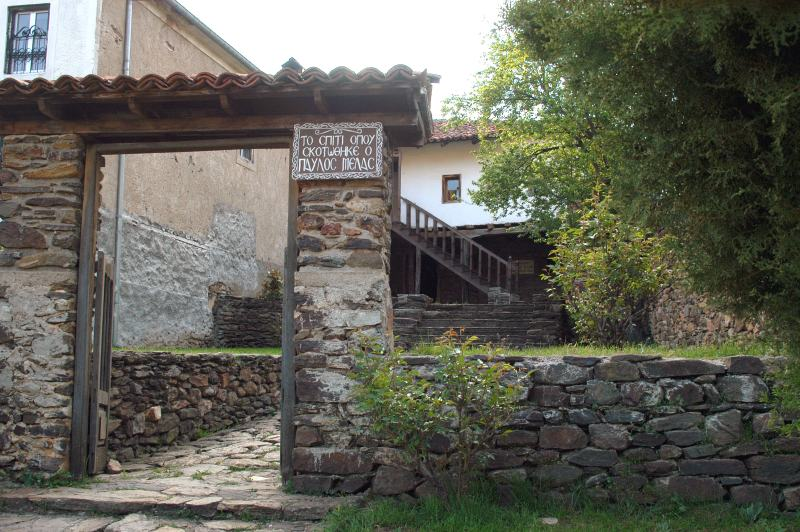
External View

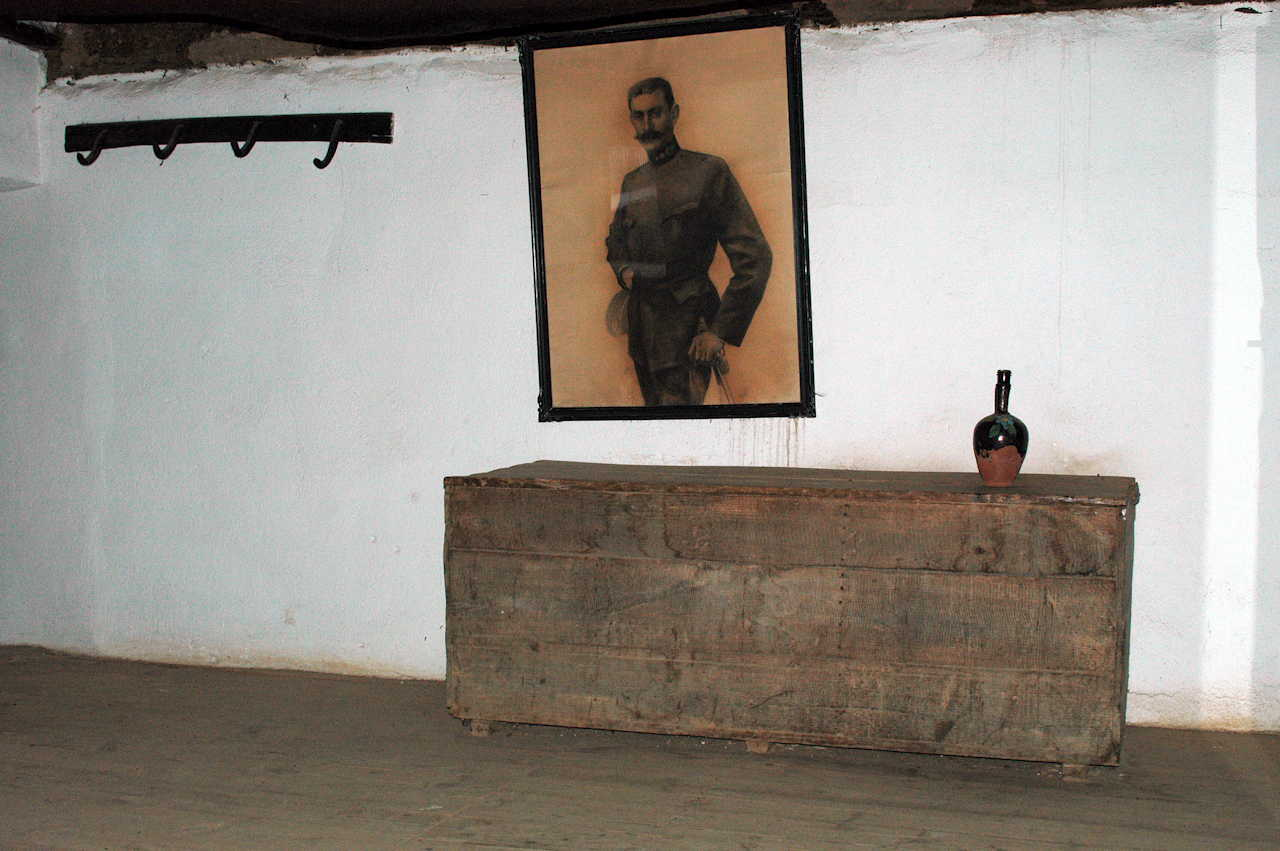
Internal View 1

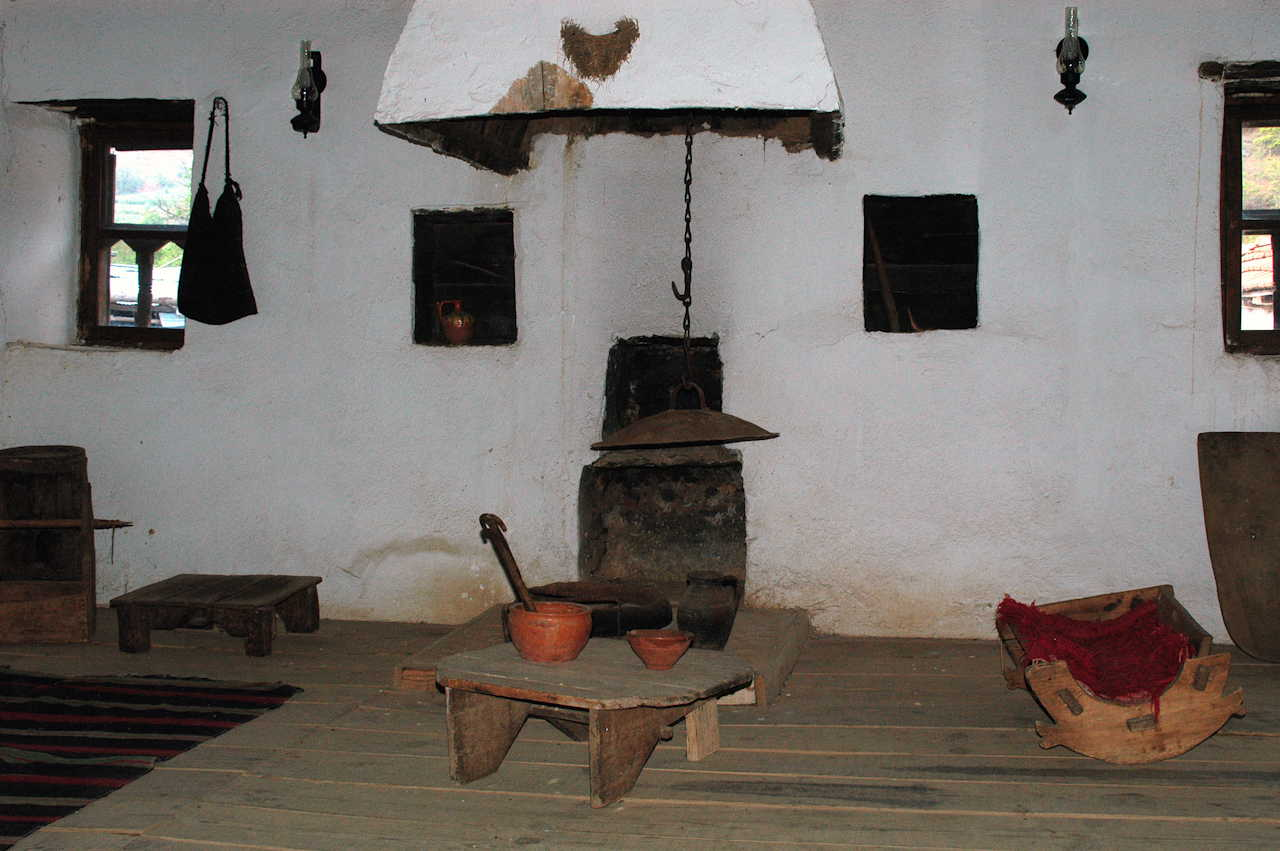
Internal View 2

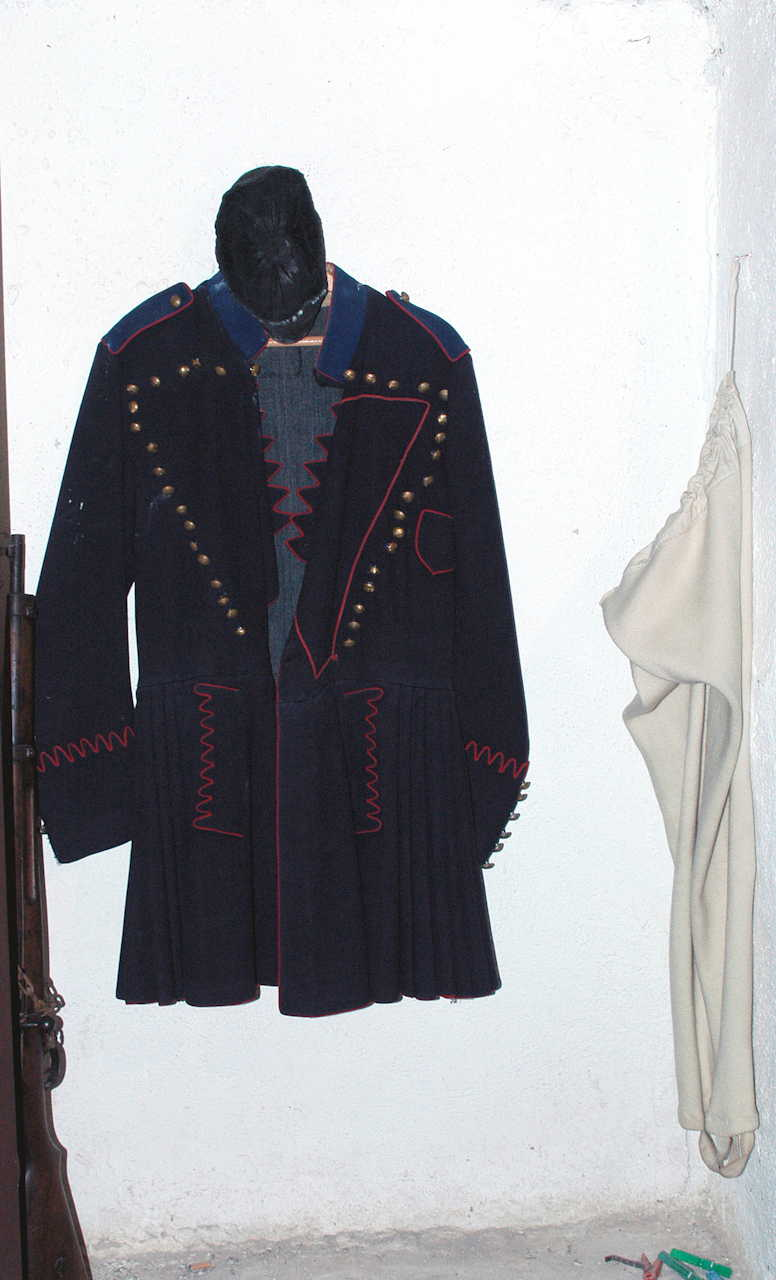
Uniform of Makedonomachos
