= Carmela Combe =

First Peruvian woman aviator

- Born: Carmela Combe Thomson; 1898; Peru
- Died: 10 May 1984 (aged 85–86)
- Occupation: Aviator
- Known for: First Peruvian woman pilot
- Spouse: Jorge Bardi

Carmela Combe Thomson (1898 – 10 May 1984) was the first Peruvian woman aviator and the second Peruvian to obtain a driver's license.

== Biography ==
Carmela Combe was precocious in regard to vehicles, learning to drive a car at age 14. In 1920, she began her apprenticeship as an aviator at the National Aeronautics Company of Lima, a school belonging to the Curtiss Aeroplane Company, which had its airfield in Bellavista District.

At 20, after completing her aviation course, she enrolled in the Civil Aviation School of Bellavista, where she was a student of the American pilot Lloyd R. Moore. In addition to flying, she had a passion for auto racing, competing in both cars and motorcycles.

On 6 May 1921, after four hours of instruction and over the objections of her male colleagues, Carmela Combe had her first solo flight in a Curtiss Oriole.

Her aviation career was very short. On 9 July, after transporting money to pay the wages of farm workers in San Vicente de Cañete, she had to make an emergency landing in Chorrillos due to an engine breakdown. The mechanical failure was caused by the use of ordinary gasoline instead of 100-octane fuel. The incident was reported by El Comercio as "Pilot Moore and Miss Carmela Combe fall from high altitude. The passengers were unharmed." The impact of the landing affected her spine, which resulted in chronic pain and deafness. Despite this, she remained determined to continue flying.

She borrowed money from her parents to purchase a Curtiss biplane. However, a few months later it crashed in Ancash, killing pilot Emilio Romance, to whom she had lent it to transport cargo. This alarmed her mother, who begged her to stop flying. Combe did not give up, and in 1922 she obtained her pilot's license from Elmer J. Faucett, founder of the airline Faucett Perú. She traveled to France, where she married Julio Bardi, and was able to fly alongside the famous pilot Marcel Doret. In 1932, she retired from aviation.

She wrote on social matters for the magazine Mundial under the pseudonym "Marisabidilla".

Combe received two awards for her achievements in aviation. On 27 September 1960, the Peruvian Air Force recognized her with the Peruvian Cross for Aeronautical Merit for being a pioneer of civil aviation. Twenty-two years later, on 27 September 1982, the Ministry of Aeronautics presented her with the Jorge Chávez Dartnell merit medal for her contribution to the development of civil aviation.

Carmela Combe died on 10 May 1984 after a long illness.
