= Pavlos Melas =

Hellenic Army officer (1870–1904)

Pavlos Melas Παῦλος Μελᾶς
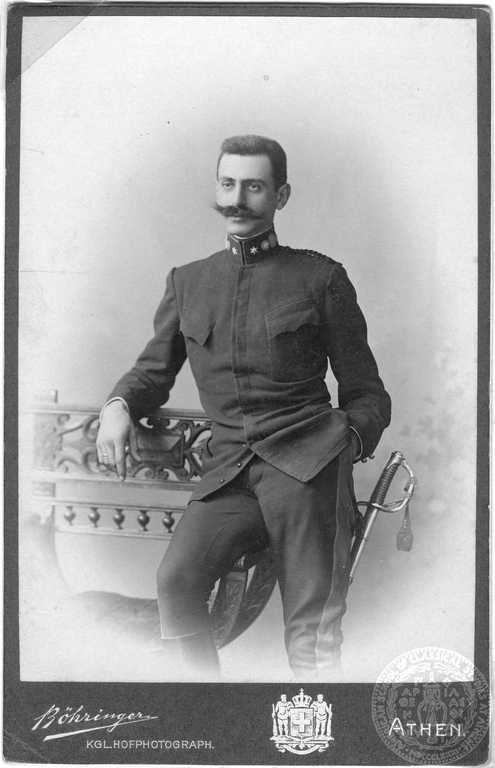
- Pavlos Melas in uniform.
- Born: 29 March 1870; Marseille, Second French Empire
- Died: 13 October 1904 (aged 34); Statitsa, Ottoman Empire (now Melas, Greece)
- Burial place: Kastoria, Greece
- Alma mater: Hellenic Army Academy
- Spouse: Natalia Dragoumi
- Children: 2
- Relatives: Michail Melas (father); Vasileios Melas (brother); Anna Mela-Papadopoulou (sister); Natalia Mela (granddaughter); Stephanos Dragoumis (father-in-law); Ion Dragoumis (brother-in-law)
- Military career
- Allegiance: Kingdom of Greece
- Branch: Hellenic Army
- Service years: 1891–1904
- Rank: Second lieutenant
- Nicknames: Kapetan Mikis Zezas; Καπετάν Μίκης Ζέζας
- Conflicts: Greco-Turkish War (1897); Battle of Domokos; Macedonian Struggle †
- Other work: Member of the Ethniki Etaireia; Member of the HMC

Pavlos Melas (Greek: Παύλος Μελάς, romanized: Pávlos Melás; 29 March 1870 – 13 October 1904) was a Greek revolutionary and artillery officer of the Hellenic Army. He participated in the Greco-Turkish War of 1897 and was amongst the first Greek officers to join the Macedonian Struggle.

== Early life and career ==
Melas was born in 1870 in Marseille, France, as the son of Michail Melas who was elected MP for Attica and mayor of Athens and brother of Vassileios M. Melas, who was also an officer of the Hellenic Army. The Melas family was of Greek aristocratic descent. His father was a wealthy merchant from Epirus. In 1876, his family moved to Athens. He graduated from the Hellenic Army Academy as an artillery lieutenant in 1891. In 1892, he married Natalia Dragoumi, the daughter of Kastorian politician Stephanos Dragoumis and sister of Ion Dragoumis. In 1895, the couple had a son named Michael and a daughter, Zoe. He became member 25 of the Ethniki Etaireia. Melas participated in the Greco-Turkish War of 1897. He was an Orthodox Christian.

== Armed action ==
Melas, with the cooperation of his brother-in-law Ion Dragoumis, the consul of Greece in the then Ottoman city Monastir (now Bitola), Kottas Christou, and Germanos Karavangelis, metropolitan bishop of Kastoria, tried to raise money for the economic support of Greek efforts in Macedonia. After the Ilinden-Preobrazhenie uprising, he decided to enter Macedonia in June 1904, to assess the situation and to see if there is any possibility of establishing a military unit to fight the Bulgarian Komitadjis (Internal Macedonian Revolutionary Organization, IMRO) and the Ottoman Turks. In July 1904, under the alias "Captain Mikis Zezas" (Καπετάν Μίκης Ζέζας), he reentered Macedonia with a small unit of men and fought against the IMRO. They crossed the border by Meritsa and worked their way up into the Florina region, recruiting new members as they went.

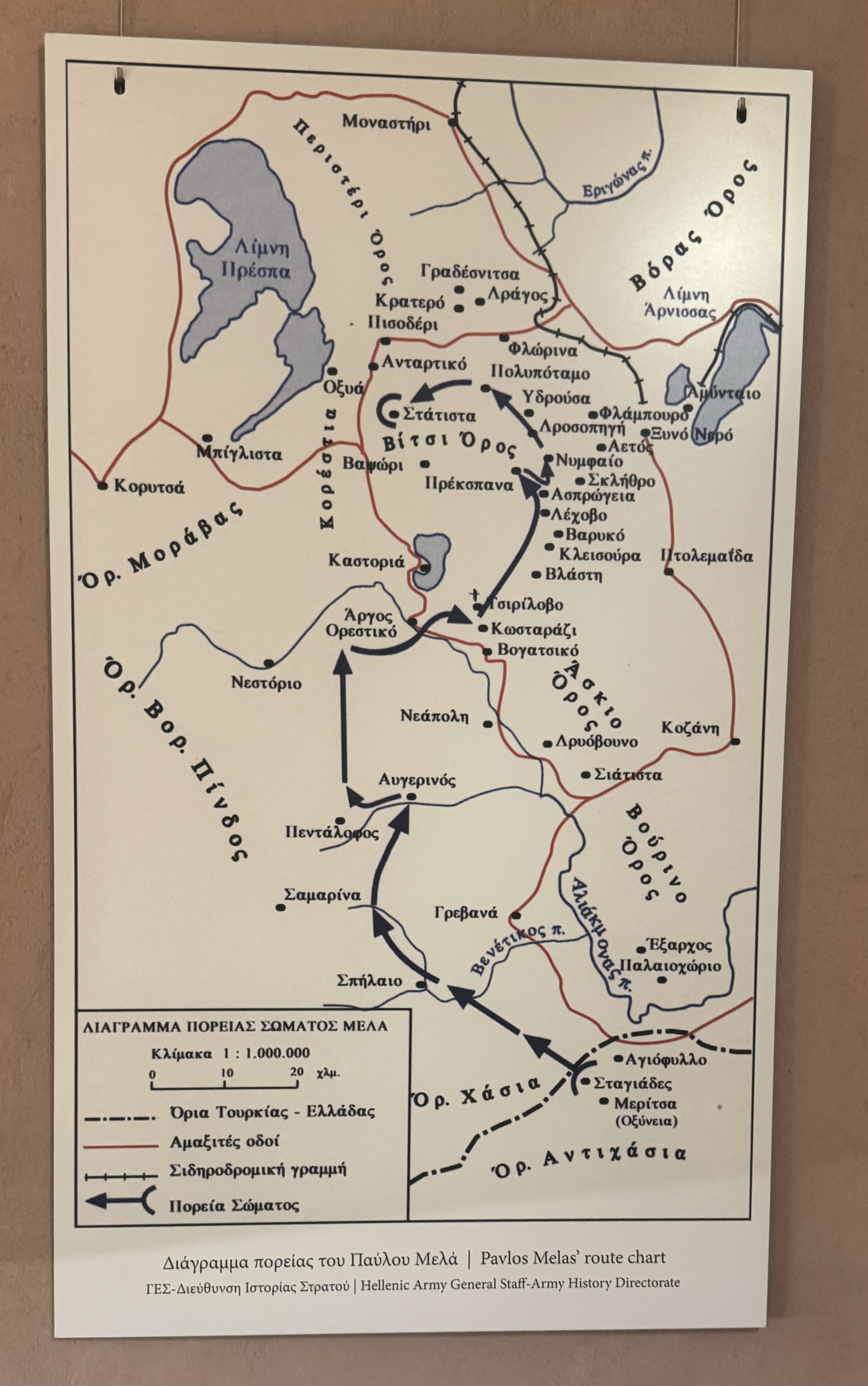
A map showing the route Melas and his unit took, Pavlos Melas House, Athens

== Death ==
On 13 October 1904, Melas was killed after being surrounded by Ottoman forces in the village of Statista. News about his death spread in Greek society. In Athens, the Journalists' Union of Daily Newspapers organised a memorial service to honour him, which was attended by 100,000 people. Schools and shops were closed, and numerous flags, mourning ribbons and portraits of him were set up. The village in which he was killed has been renamed Melas in his honour, after joining Greece. After his death, Greek efforts were intensified, resulting in more resources being dedicated for Macedonia by the Greek government. The efforts were aimed at weakening Bulgarian armed influence.

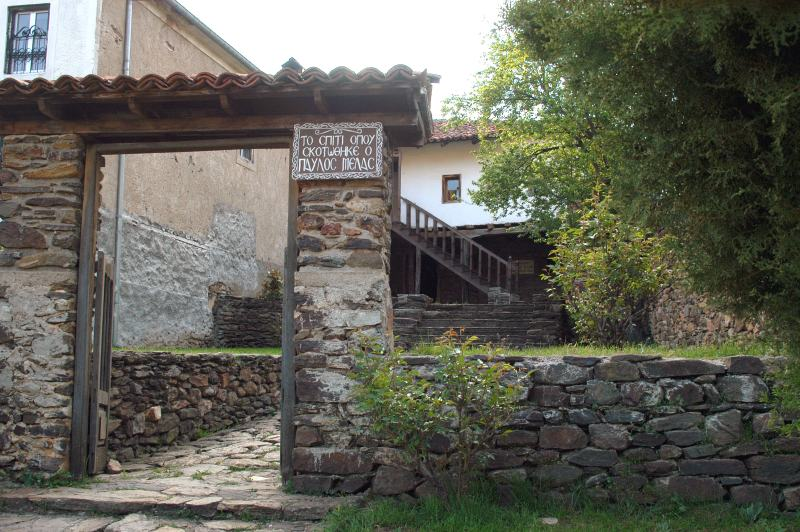
The house where Pavlos Melas was killed

== Legacy ==
He is considered to be a national hero of the Macedonian Struggle.

Many of his personal belongings can be seen in the National Historical Museum in Athens, the Museum of the Macedonian Struggle in Thessaloniki, the Pavlos Melas Museum in Kastoria, and the Pavlos Melas House in Kifissia, Athens.

A bust of him was made on his cenotaph at Kastoria, commissioned by his wife and co-funded by the municipality in 1920, with the inscription calling him the "first martyr for Macedonian liberty".

His granddaughter, Natalia Mela, was a sculptor.

== Gallery ==
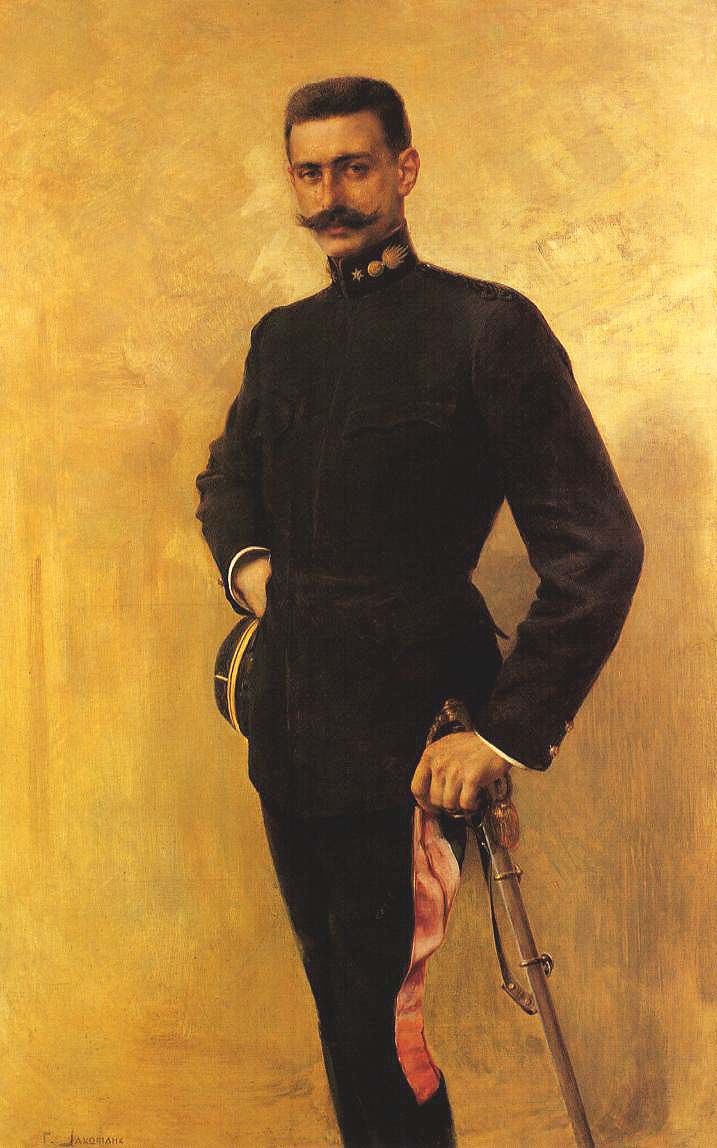
Pavlos Melas as a second lieutenant in the Greek Army. Portrait by Georgios Jakobides.

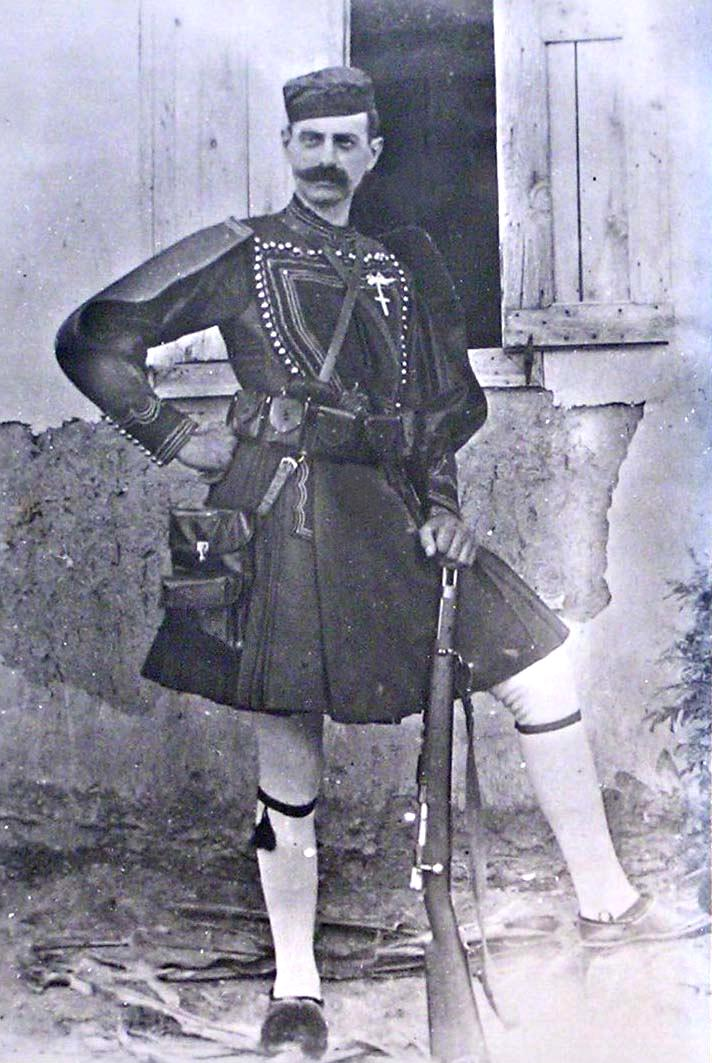
Pavlos Melas in Makedonomachos uniform, 1904

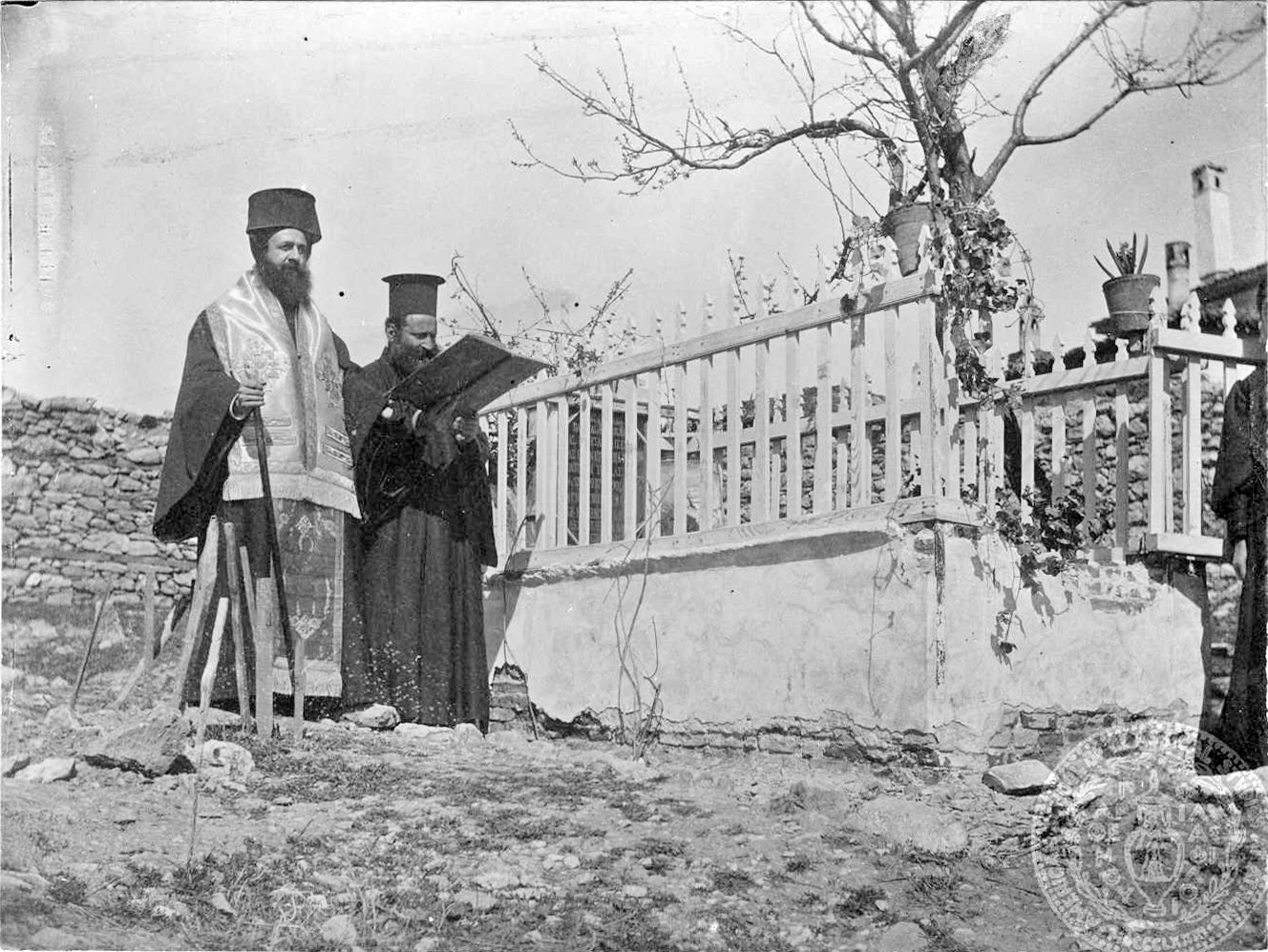
Germanos Karavangelis at the grave of Pavlos Melas, 1906

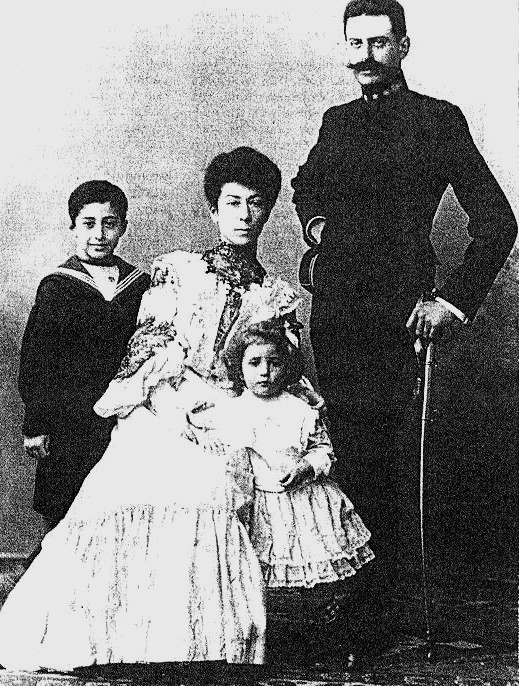
Pavlos Melas with his wife and children
