= Carmela Abraham =

American neuroscientist

- Occupations: Research Assistant Professor of Biochemistry, Pharmacology and Experimental Therapeutics Founder and Chief Scientific Officer Chief Scientific Officer

Academic background
- Education: B.Sc., Biology, Tel Aviv University; Ph.D., Neuroscience, Harvard University

Carmela R. Abraham is an American neuroscientist who focuses on the study of Alzheimer's disease.

== Early life and education ==
Abraham earned her Bachelor of Science degree in Biology from Tel Aviv University and her PhD in Neuroscience from Harvard University. In 1990, Abraham was the recipient of The Neuroscience Education and Research Foundation Award for an Outstanding Promise as a Young Alzheimer Investigator. She was also the first Rappaport Scholar at the Center for Neurologic Diseases at Brigham and Women's Hospital, and the recipient of the Zenith and Temple awards from the Alzheimer's Association.

== Career ==
Upon completing her PhD, Abraham accepted a position at Boston University School of Medicine (BU) as a Professor of Biochemistry and Pharmacology & Experimental Therapeutics. In this role, she was the recipient of a $200,000 grant from the Alzheimer's Association to support her research on drug therapy for Alzheimer's disease. Later, she identified Klotho, an anti-aging and anti-cancer protein that could reduce ageing in the brain. Her research team conducted a high throughput screen of 150,000 molecules, which led to the identification of three lead compounds that could prevent age-related diseases and overall healthier ageing. Following this, Abraham and her research team identified the importance of Klotho on the health of myelin and found small molecules that could form the basis for the development of therapeutic drugs.

During her time at BU, Abraham also co-founded Klogene Therapeutics, a pre-clinical stage gene therapy startup company developing novel treatments for neurodegenerative diseases. In 2016, she was awarded a $1.49 Million small business innovation research grant to be used towards the development of novel therapeutics for Alzheimer's disease and other neurodegenerative diseases. She also discovered a molecule that reduced the formation of amyloid beta protein in cells grown in petri dishes, leading the possibility of new therapy for Alzheimer's disease. In recognition of her "work on multiple sclerosis and the role of the life extension protein Klotho in the limited repair of white matter in the disease," Abraham was the recipient of a Massachusetts Neuroscience Consortium Award. She is also a member of the Society for Neuroscience, American Society for Neurochemistry, American Association of Neuropathologists, New York Academy of Science, International Society for Amyloidosis, and American Association for the Advancement of Science.

Abraham also contributed to the research of chronic traumatic encephalopathy. This research showed that chronic traumatic encephalopathy and neurodegenerative disorders follow a similar trend. Abraham and others researchers studied the relationship between chronic traumatic encephalopathy and other neurodegenerative disorders. Abraham also helped conduct a study that led to the discovery of transgenic mice with an increased level of IL-6 expression had a higher likelihood of developing neurological diseases with symptoms such as tremor, seizure, and ataxia. They also found that many of the mice in this study's offspring also had higher levels of IL-6 and neurologic syndrome.
