= Michail Melas =

Greek politician (1833–1897)

Mihail Melas
- Μιχαήλ Μελάς
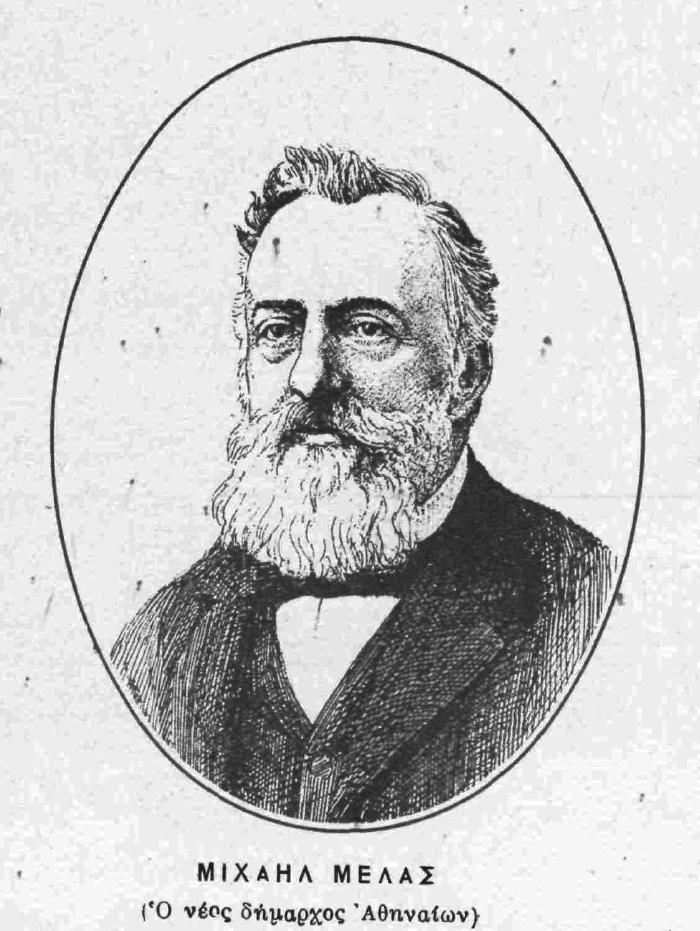
- Portrait of Melas on his election as Mayor of Athens

Mayor of Athens
- In office 1 October 1891 – 31 October 1894
- Preceded by: Timoleon Filimon
- Succeeded by: Dimitrios Silyvriotis

Personal details
- Born: 1833 Syros, Greece
- Died: 17 June 1897 (aged 63–64)
- Spouse: Eleni Voutsina
- Children: Maria, Anna, Georgios, Pavlos, Leon, Konstantinos, Vassilios
- Education: Law (Paris)
- Profession: Politician; merchant
- Known for: Mayor of Athens, Founder of Athens Club, Member of Ethniki Etaireia

Mihail Melas (Greek: Μιχαήλ Μελάς; 1833 – 17 June 1897) was a Greek politician and merchant, who served as Mayor of Athens from 1 October 1891 until 31 October 1894.

== Biography ==
He was born in Syros, the son of Georgios Melas, a member of the Filiki Eteria and the scion of a distinguished Epirote family. He studied law in Paris and became involved with commerce at an early age, importing Russian wheat to London and Marseille. From these activities he amassed a large fortune.

In 1874, Melas settled permanently in Athens, where he soon achieved a distinguished place among Athenian high society. He played a crucial role in the foundation of the Athens Club in 1875, the Greek capital's oldest and most exclusive gentlemen's club, and served as its president in 1882–1886 and 1888–1897. In 1890, he was elected to the Greek Parliament for Attica. He became mayor of Athens in 1891, holding the office until 1894, after an unsuccessful first attempt in 1883, when he lost to Dimitrios Soutsos. Melas also served in the founding board of the Hellenic Red Cross, and as chairman of the Ethniki Etaireia, a secret nationalist society, which played a major role in the outbreak of the disastrous Greco-Turkish War of 1897. Melas is also notable as one of the first Athenians to build a house in Kifissia, then a suburban summer resort for the capital's wealthy families. He was also an avid art collector, and during his stay in Marseille, he chaired the local French Cultural Club for several years. In 1886–1888, he served as president of the Filekpaideftiki Etaireia ("Learned Society"), a charitable educational society founded in 1836.

== Family ==
He was married with Eleni Voutsina and had seven children: Maria, wife of Ektoras Romanos, chamberlain of Prince Nicholas of Greece; Anna, wife of the landowner Apostolos Papadopoulos; Georgios (1866–1931) a judge and private secretary of King Constantine I; Pavlos (1870–1904), an Army officer and hero of the Macedonian Struggle; Leon (1872–1905), a lawyer and politician; Konstantinos Melas (1874–1953), a Navy officer and politician; and Vassilios (1879–1956), a general and also president of the Athens Club.

Preceded by Timoleon Filimon	Mayor of Athens; 1891–1894	Succeeded by Dimitrios Silyvriotis
