= Elaeus (Epirus) =

Elaeus or Elaious (Ancient Greek: Ἔλαιοῦς) was a town in Chaonia in ancient Epirus, mentioned only by Ptolemy, but probably situated in the plain Elaeon, of which Livy speaks. Although William Martin Leake supposed this plain to have been that between Arghyrókastro and Libókhovo, and that the town of Elaeus stood on the heights, opposite to Arghyrókastro, where it is said that some remains of Hellenic walls were seen during his visit in the mid-19th century, modern scholars treat it as unlocated.
