= Melafind =

Medical device

MelaFind is a discontinued medical device developed by MELA Sciences, based in Irvington, NY. It was the first dermatological AI device to receive approval by the FDA. MelaFind is a non-invasive tool that provides additional information to dermatologists during melanoma skin examinations. The device uses light from visible to near-infrared wavelengths to evaluate skin lesions up to 2.5 mm beneath the skin. The device provides information on a lesion's level of morphologic disorganization to provide additional objective information that may be used by dermatologists in the biopsy decision-making process.

MelaFind received CE Mark approval in November 2011 and is approved for use in the European Union. MelaFind received approval from the US Food and Drug Administration in November 2011 for use in the US. MelaFind was listed as one of the Top 10 Medical Innovations for 2013 compiled by the Cleveland Clinic and received a bronze Edison award for its innovation.

The MelaFind pivotal study was the largest positive prospective clinical study ever conducted in melanoma detection with 1,384 patients presenting 1,831 skin lesions. This study aimed to establish the safety and effectiveness of MelaFind using sensitivity and specificity as metrics. The device demonstrated 98.3% sensitivity by correctly identifying 172 out of 175 melanomas and high-grade lesions. Dermatologists detected 72% of melanomas in the study. The median Breslow thickness of invasive melanomas in the pivotal study was 0.365 mm and 45% of all melanomas were in situ, indicating melanomas tested were clinically challenging and in a treatable stage. MelaFind was more specific than dermatologists in the study; MelaFind demonstrated 10.8% specificity vs. 5.6% dermatologist specificity.

Another study of MelaFind tested 47 lesions, with 23 being malignant and 24 being non-malignant. In this study, MelaFind identified 44 out of the 47 lesions as requiring a biopsy. Out of the 3 identified as not requiring biopsy, 1 was malignant.

MelaFind was discontinued in 2017 due to leading to unnecessary biopsies, having narrow usage, to having low specificity, and limited coverage.
