= Elaeus (Caria) =

Town of ancient Doris and Caria

Elaeus was a town on the coast of Sinus Doridis (the "Gulf of Doris"), in ancient Doris in Asia Minor noted by Pliny the Elder; its location was later in Caria, and now in modern Turkey. An attempt has been made among scholars to ascertain which of two bays Pliny calls the Gulf of Doris, the more probable being the Ceramic Gulf.
