= Carmela Carvajal =

Wife of Arturo Prat Chacón

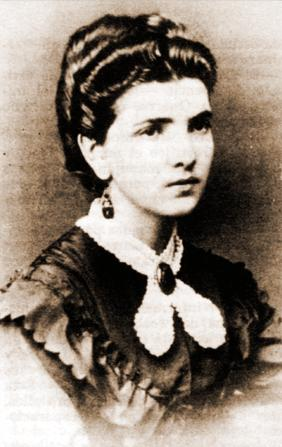
Carmela Carvajal.

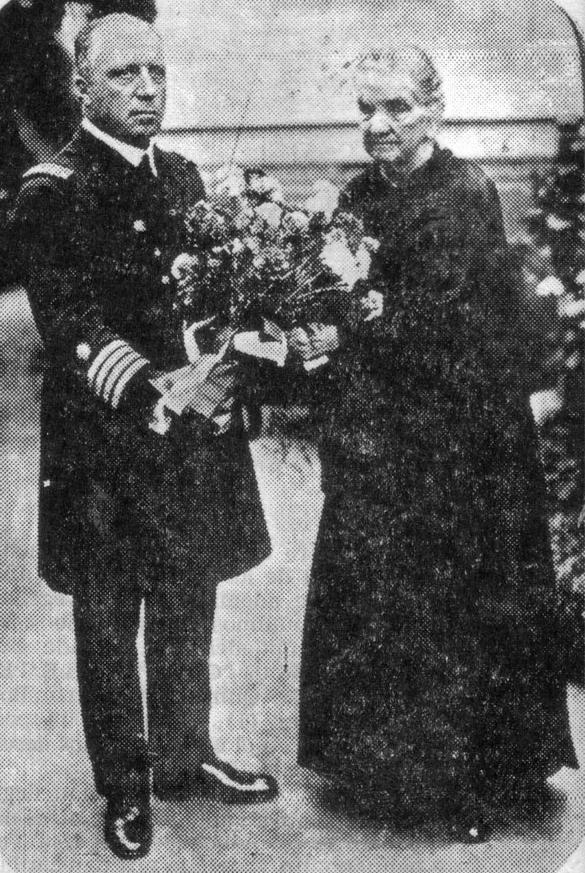
Doña Carmela Carvajal de Prat, in one of her last photographs, receiving tribute from Commodore Julio Víctor Goicochea Álvarez, commander of the first Peruvian squadron to visit Chile after the War of the Pacific. Early 20th century.

Carmela Carvajal Briones (Quillota, July 16, 1851 - Santiago, August 16, 1931) was the wife of the Chilean navy captain Arturo Prat, hero of the Battle of Iquique.

== Biography ==
=== Childhood ===
Carmela Carvajal, the youngest of four siblings, was born to Diego Carvajal Zamora and María Briones Insunza, who were of Castilian origin. Orphaned in 1862, she attended a secular school in Valparaíso, where she learned French from the French religious who founded the school.

Carmela grew up in the Carvajal family's country house in Charravata, Quillota. Her brother José Jesús, who was married to Concepción Chacón, introduced her to Arturo Prat during social gatherings in Valparaíso, as Concepción was the sister of María del Rosario Chacón, Prat's mother.

Between 1866 and 1869, Carmela presented Prat with gifts, which are now preserved in the "Museo histórico hacienda San Agustín de Puñual," Prat's birthplace in Ninhue. These gifts included a seedbed and a note that read "to the victor of Covadonga, happiness." Their friendship blossomed into a romantic relationship, possibly formalized in 1869.

In her youth, Carmela Carvajal was a shy woman with a tall and attractive appearance. She had dark brown hair and big black eyes that often carried a melancholic expression.

=== Courtship with Prat ===
In December 1869, Lieutenant Prat returned on the corvette Esmeralda from a trip to Peru, where he had repatriated O'Higgins' remains. On this journey, Prat brought gifts for Carmela: a sewing kit, a fan, a silver cross, and an ivory cardholder.

Their relationship was evident but highly private for Prat, who became annoyed when their courtship was mentioned. One reason for his annoyance was the fear of formalizing a relationship without sufficient financial means to support a marriage. To overcome this situation, he decided to pursue an education and began studying law as an independent student at the National Institute in 1871.

When he received news of his promotion to frigate captain, Prat finally decided to propose to Carmela in 1873. A little later, the only publicly known love letter from Prat to his girlfriend was discovered:

"My Carmela, my life, my treasure, I write to ease your concerns about my health. I am well, and my hand has stopped swelling. I expect to improve in a couple of days and write you a long letter, as I have much to share, including how deeply I adore you, growing more passionate each day. I refrain from doing so now for fear of worsening my condition. Receive the ardent heart of your Arturo."

=== Marriage ===
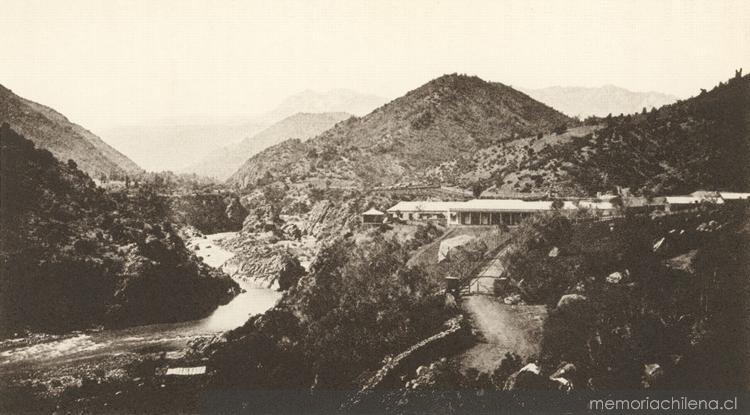
Cauquenes Hot Springs, honeymoon destination of the Prat Carvajal couple in 1873.

On May 5, 1873, the couple married in Valparaíso. Carmela, aged 21, had to provide a notarized permission due to the minimum marriage age of 25 at that time. The wedding took place at Espíritu Santo parish, where they were blessed by clergyman José Francisco Salas at 10:30 a.m. Prat treated his wife as an equal, entrusted her with the family budget, and took care of some household matters. After their honeymoon in Quillota and the Cauquenes Hot Springs, Prat resumed his naval duties in Valparaíso. They settled in Prat's maternal home on Calle del Circo No. 58. The couple's strong bond developed through their correspondence during Prat's absences. In a letter, Prat expressed his longing for his wife and urged her to maintain regular correspondence. Another letter showcased Prat's deep affection for Carmela and his anticipation of their reunion.

=== Birth of their children ===
By then, Carmela was pregnant, and Prat recorded the birth of their daughter. Carmela de la Concepción Prat Carvajal was born on March 5, 1874, at 9:35 a.m. Prat had been away in Santiago the day before. The baby was baptized on April 5 with Conchita and José Jesús as godparents.

Prat envisioned his daughter as lively, cheerful, and playful. He dreamt of her and felt that she recognized him, although she appeared somewhat sad in his dream. Despite her expression, she hugged him tightly.

Unfortunately, like Prat's ill-fated older brothers, the girl inherited a weak and fragile constitution. Prat advised Carmela to continue using homeopathy, hoping it would work wonders for their daughter's health. However, the treatment did not prove successful, and the girl's health deteriorated, causing anguish for her powerless mother and desperate father.

Carmelita suffered from a hernia resulting from the removal of her umbilical cord, which was worsened by various ailments such as diarrhea and fever. At the end of his annual station, Prat, in despair, had to travel to the central part of the country on the Abtao, which was delayed. Finally, on Sunday, December 13, the steamship arrived, and Prat informed his wife that he would soon visit, hoping to find their daughter completely healthy. However, in the evening, he received a heart-wrenching letter from his wife, expressing her pain and longing for his support.

To Prat's dismay, the steamship didn't depart until the 18th. His hopes were shattered during the journey when he received a letter of condolences at an intermediate port, signed by Juan José Latorre. Arturo added a note at the bottom of Carmela's previous letter, stating that their daughter, Carmela de la Concepción, had died on December 5, 1874, at 1:03 a.m. The news was delivered through the letter, and despite the bitterness it conveyed, Prat clung to hope.

On July 31, 1876, Prat graduated as a lawyer after nearly five years of study, bringing joy to the Prat Carvajal household. Carmela urged him to leave the Chilean Navy and pursue a career in law, considering their financial difficulties and her pleas. However, Prat, despite his degree and challenging financial situation, declined, expressing his belief that he could serve his country in a different capacity.

On September 11, 1876, the Prat Carvajal family in Valparaíso celebrated the birth of their daughter Blanca Estela. Two years later, on December 29, 1878, their first son Arturo Héctor was born.

=== During the War of the Pacific ===
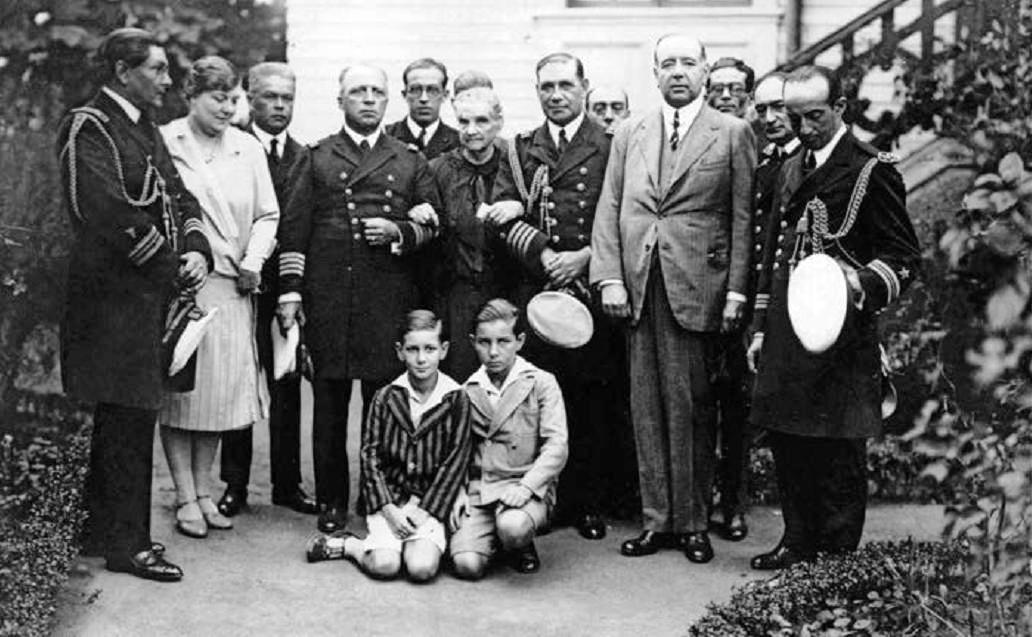
Visit to Carmela Carvajal (in the center) by Peruvian Navy Captain Julio Goicochea Álvarez (on her right). On the left of his mother, in civilian attire, Arturo Prat Carvajal, circa 1928.

From November 1878 to February 15, 1879, Prat was separated from his wife as he was assigned a mission in Uruguay and Argentina. He spent less than a month at home.

On March 5, 1879, at the start of the War of the Pacific, Prat left for northern Chile as an aide to future minister Rafael Sotomayor Baeza, leaving Carmela alone with their two children.

Arturo Prat's death occurred on May 21, 1879, during the naval combat of Iquique while commanding the Esmeralda. He carried a daguerreotype portrait of his wife in a locket that he had since 1869. The news of his death reached Valparaíso two days later, but Carmela only learned about it on the night of May 24 through the newspaper.

Admiral Miguel Grau Seminario, captain of the Huáscar, sent Prat's personal belongings, including a diary, uniform, and sword, to his widow. Carmela Carvajal also received a letter from the Peruvian admiral, known as "The Gentleman of the Seas."

In response, Carmela expressed her gratitude to Miguel Grau for his letter and the invaluable possessions he sent her. She clarified that she didn't hold him responsible for her husband's death, acknowledging his bravery and joining her in grief. She praised his chivalrous demeanor and noble words, highlighting the grand display of magnanimous sentiments and heroic struggles witnessed during the war.

Carmela signed her letter as S.S. Carmela Carvajal de Prat, offering herself as an attentive and devoted servant to Miguel Grau.

=== Widowhood and death ===
After becoming a widow, Carmela Carvajal, along with Arturo Prat's mother, received a lifelong state pension. Initially granted on September 12, 1879, the pension amounted to $2,400 annually, which was generous compared to Prat's monthly salary of $300 and the pension received by the surviving crew of the Esmeralda. The pension was increased to $6,000 in 1880 and $18,000 in 1912. They also received $500 annually to support their children's education.

To distance herself from the pain caused by Prat's death, Carmela Carvajal chose to live in Curimón. She returned to Valparaíso in 1881 but tragically lost everything in a house fire that same year, except for the cherished relics sent by Grau. When her children entered university, she relocated to Santiago.

Carmela Carvajal remained unmarried and died on August 16, 1931, due to an angina attack. Her death caused profound sorrow in the country due to her bravery as the wife of the hero of Iquique.

== Descendants ==
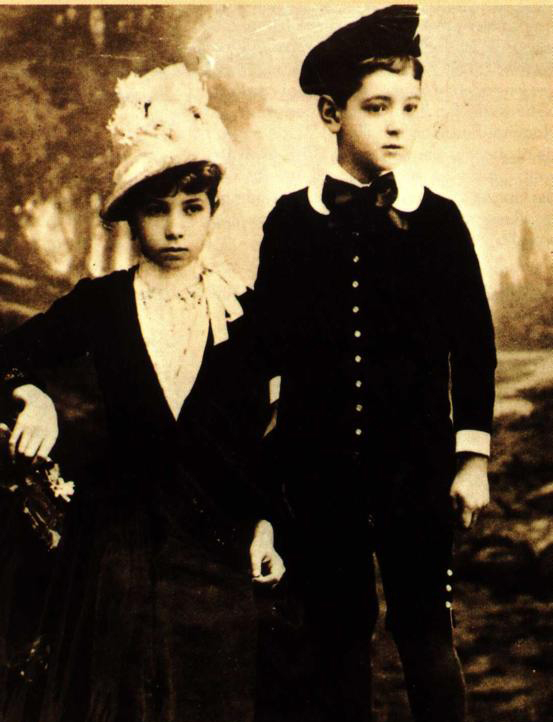
Blanca Estela and Arturo Héctor Prat Carvajal.

She is survived by her two children with Arturo Prat Chacón:

- Blanca Estela Prat Carvajal, who married Ramón Camilo Undurraga in 1905. They had four children: Arturo, Camilo, Horacio, and Fernando Undurraga Prat.
- Arturo Héctor Prat Carvajal, who served as a congressman from 1915 to 1921 and as Minister of Finance in 1916-1917 and 1931. He married Blanca Echaurren in 1909, and they had five children: Arturo, Carlos, Jorge, Alfredo, and Roberto Prat Echaurren.
