= Mela (company) =

South Asian streaming service (2011)

- Industry: Entertainment
- Genre: South Asian
- Founded: August 21, 2011
- Headquarters: Santa Clara, California, US

Mela is a global entertainment consumer service with one of the largest aggregations of premium South Asian video content. It was launched in October 2011 by Verismo Networks. Mela offers hit Bollywood and regional South Asian movies and live news and entertainment television channels. The service is distributed through a variety of streaming devices. Mela's content includes around 1,000 movies and over 70 live television channels in Hindi, Tamil, Telugu, Kannada, Marathi, Punjabi, and Gujarati. It holds the largest selection of live Telugu channels in the United States.

Mela has established partnerships for local distribution throughout the United States, Canada, UK, and Australia, and has announced plans to expand into other international markets in a phased manner.

== Launches ==
Mela announced its launch in August 2011. The service became available to consumers in October 2011 on the Mela high definition set top box for television. The service offers archiving for up to seven days of all of its live Telugu TV channels and 24-hour archiving on some of its live Tamil TV channels.

The Mela Bollywood movies channel on the popular Roku streaming player was launched in the U.S. in December 2011, offering hit Bollywood and regional South Asian films. It expanded to the UK in February 2012. Mela launched its iPad app globally with the Bollywood movies in January 2012. In April 2012, Mela's platform expanded to include PC's.

On May 11, 2012, Mela launched MelaTV, streaming 24-hour, live television content and "MelaFlix" (select movies) for Hindi and other regional South Asian languages on Roku players, iPads, Kindle Fire, Samsung Galaxy Tablet, Samsung Smart TVs and Blu-ray players, PC, Mac OS, and other Internet-enabled devices. MelaTV allows subscribers to sign up using one login account to access the service on multiple devices. In June 2012, the Mela Movies App became available on Android gingerbread, honeycomb and ice cream sandwich tablets.

== Partnerships ==
Mela has content partnerships with three of the biggest Bollywood studios/distributors, including Yash Raj Films, Eros Entertainment, and Shemaroo Entertainment. Mela's television partners include premium regional television networks from South Asia including Sun TV, Gemini TV, UTV, B4U and ETV.

In January 2012, Mela became the first global digital Bollywood service to release new movies in international markets simultaneous to their theatrical releases in India. Films released under this initiative include the 2012 horror film Ghost and independent film, Good Night Good Morning. The First Day First Show initiative was officially launched in March 2012 with Chaurahen. Directed by Rajshree Ojha and starring Soha Ali Khan, Zeenat Aman, Kiera Chaplin, and Victor Banerjee, the film was released by PVR Cinemas in local theaters in India, and simultaneously on the Mela service worldwide. The next film in the First Day First Show series was Oscar-nominated director Ashvin Kumar's "The Forest". "Starring Jaaved Jaffrey, Nandan Sen, and Ankur Vikal, the film was released by PVR Cinemas in local theaters in India on May 11, 2012 and was simultaneously released on the Mela service globally.".

In January 2012, Mela acquired exclusive online U.S. rights and non-exclusive online global rights to The Dirty Picture, the December 2011 Bollywood release that won three Filmfare Awards including Best Actress for Vidya Balan Other new movie acquisitions in 2012 included Bollywood films Ready, Wanted, & Lanka, and Jodi Breakers. ".

In May 2012, Mela partnered with the New York Indian Film Festival to sponsor an Audience Choice Feature Film Award. After a ballot-based voting process, Mela's Content and Acquisitions Director Pooja Kohli presented a certificate, a prize of $2000 and an offer for distribution via Mela's library to director Bornila Chatterjee's film, "Let's Be Out, the Sun is Shining," at NYIFF's closing night ceremony.
