= Elaeus (Naxos) =

Town in ancient Greece

Elaeus or Elaious (Ancient Greek: Ἐλαιοῦς) was a town of ancient Greece on the island of Naxos. It is cited, along with Melas, in an ancient inscription dated to the 3rd century BCE.

Its site is unlocated.
