= Melas (Naxos) =

Ancient town

Coordinates: 37°05′45″N 25°26′05″E

Melas (Ancient Greek: Μελάς) was a town of ancient Greece on the island of Naxos. It is cited, along with Elaeus, in an ancient inscription dated to the 3rd century BCE.

Its site is tentatively located near modern Melanes.
