= Melas, Kastoria =

Village in Macedonia, Greece

Coordinates: 40°42′N 21°16′E

Melas Μελάς
- Community
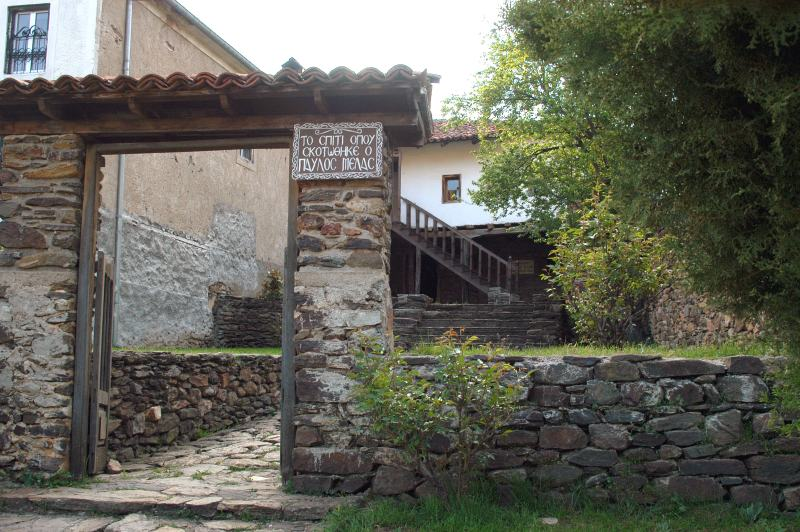
- Pavlos Melas Museum external view
- Interactive map of Melas
- Country: Greece
- Geographic region: Macedonia
- Administrative region: Western Macedonia
- Regional unit: Kastoria
- Municipality: Kastoria
- Municipal unit: Korestia
- Elevation: 980 m (3,220 ft)

Population (2021)
  - Community: 106
- Time zone: UTC+2 (EET)
  - Summer (DST): UTC+3 (EEST)

Melas (Greek: Μελάς) is a mountainous village in the regional unit of Kastoria, Macedonia, Greece. It belongs to the municipality of Kastoria and specifically to the municipal unit of Korestia. The previous name of the village was Statista (or Stathista or Agios Efstathios after the homonymous Orthodox church of Agios Efstathios). A museum dedicated to Pavlos Melas and the Greek struggle for Macedonia now operates in the village.

== Name ==
Before 1927 the village was called Statista (Greek: Στάτιστα, Bulgarian: Статица, Statitsa). The name of the village was changed to Melas, after the Greek fighter (makedonomachos) Pavlos Melas who lost his life there.

== History ==
In 1873, the village was recorded as having 60 households with 180 male Bulgarian inhabitants.

In 1900, Vasil Kanchov gathered and compiled statistics on demographics in the area and reported that the village of Statitsa was inhabited by about 600 Christian Bulgarian inhabitants.

On October 12, 1904, Pavlos Melas and his group headed to Statista (modern-day Melas). In the village, the native collaborator of Melas, Dinas Stergiou (Ντίνας Στεργίου) divided the men of the group into five houses. In the village, however, there was an organized Bulgarian army, a member of which alerted the Ottoman army to the presence of the Greek army. On October 13, the village was surrounded by an Ottoman detachment of 150 men and a fighting broke out. The dawn of the next day would find Pavlos Melas dead under an unspecified area.

In 1945, Greek Foreign Minister Ioannis Politis ordered the compilation of demographic data regarding the Prefecture of Kastoria. The village Melas had a total of 717 inhabitants, and was populated by 707 Slavophones with a Bulgarian national consciousness.
