= Elaeus (Argolis) =

Coordinates: 37°30′38″N 22°41′00″E

Elaeus or Elaious (Ancient Greek: Ἔλαιοῦς) was a town in ancient Argolis mentioned only in the Bibliotheca of Pseudo-Apollodorus and by Stephanus of Byzantium. From the statement of the former writer we may conclude that it could not have been far from Lerna, since, according to Greek mythology, Heracles, after he had succeeded in cutting off the immortal head of the Hydra, is said to have buried it by the side of the way leading from Lerna to Elaeus.

The site of Elaeus is tentatively located west-southwest of modern Speliotaki (Spiliotaki).
