= Patricio Jeria =

Chilean footballer (born 1989)

Personal information
- Full name: Patricio Andrés Jeria Alvarado
- Date of birth: 10 September 1989 (age 37)
- Place of birth: Concepción, Chile
- Height: 1.75 m (5 ft 9 in)
- Position: Centre back

Senior career*
Years	Team	Apps	(Gls)
2007–2009	Deportes Concepción	17	(1)
2010–2015	Lota Schwager	65	(3)
2013	→ Puerto Montt (loan)	65	(3)
2014–2015	→ Linares (loan)	65	(3)
- * Club domestic league appearances and goals as of 28 March 2012

Patricio Andrés Jeria Alvarado (born 10 September 1989) is a Chilean footballer.

He played for (then) Chilean Primera B side Lota Schwager as centre back.
