= Elaeus (Aetolia) =

Ancient city in Aetolia

Elaeus or Elaios (Ancient Greek: Ἔλαιος) was a town of ancient Aetolia, belonging to Calydon, and was strongly fortified, having received all the necessary munitions from king Attalus I. It was taken by Philip V of Macedon in 219 BCE. Its name indicates that it was situated in a marshy district; and it must have been on the coast to have received supplies from Attalus.
