= Anna Mela-Papadopoulou =

Greek nurse (1871–1938)

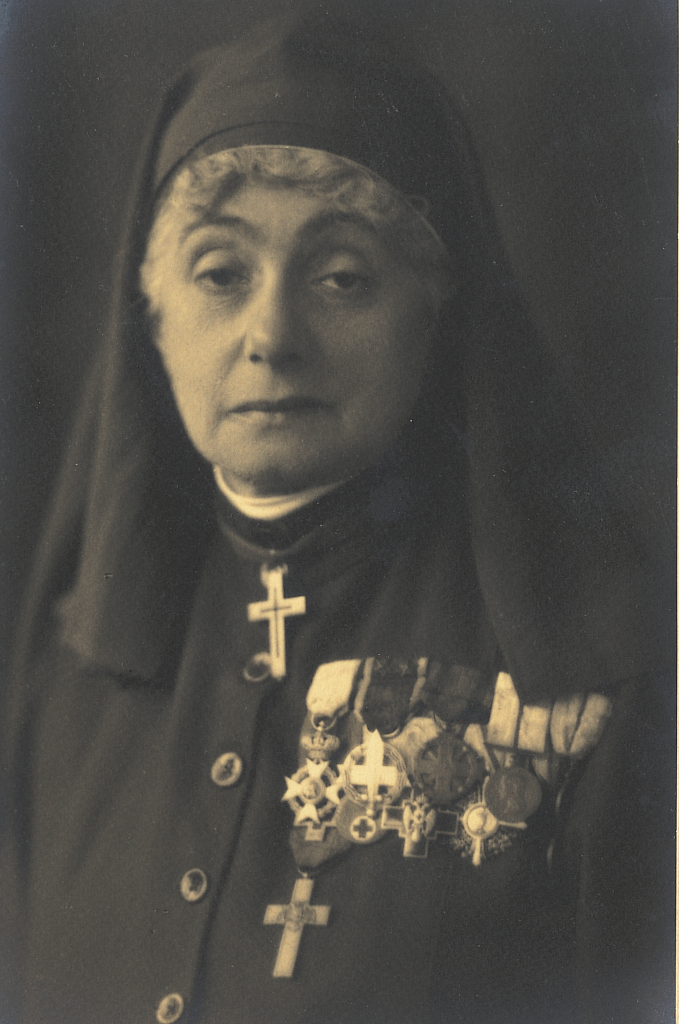
Anna Mela-Papadopoulou

Anna Mela-Papadopoulou (born 3 September 1871, in Marseille – died 12 March 1938, in Athens) was a Greek volunteer nurse who became known by the name "The Soldier's Mother" for her activity by the side of the Greek Army during the wars of the decade 1912–1922. The honorary title "The Soldier's Mother" was also attributed, in later years, to other distinguished nurses of the Greek Red Cross as a medallion, to commemorate her.

== Biography ==
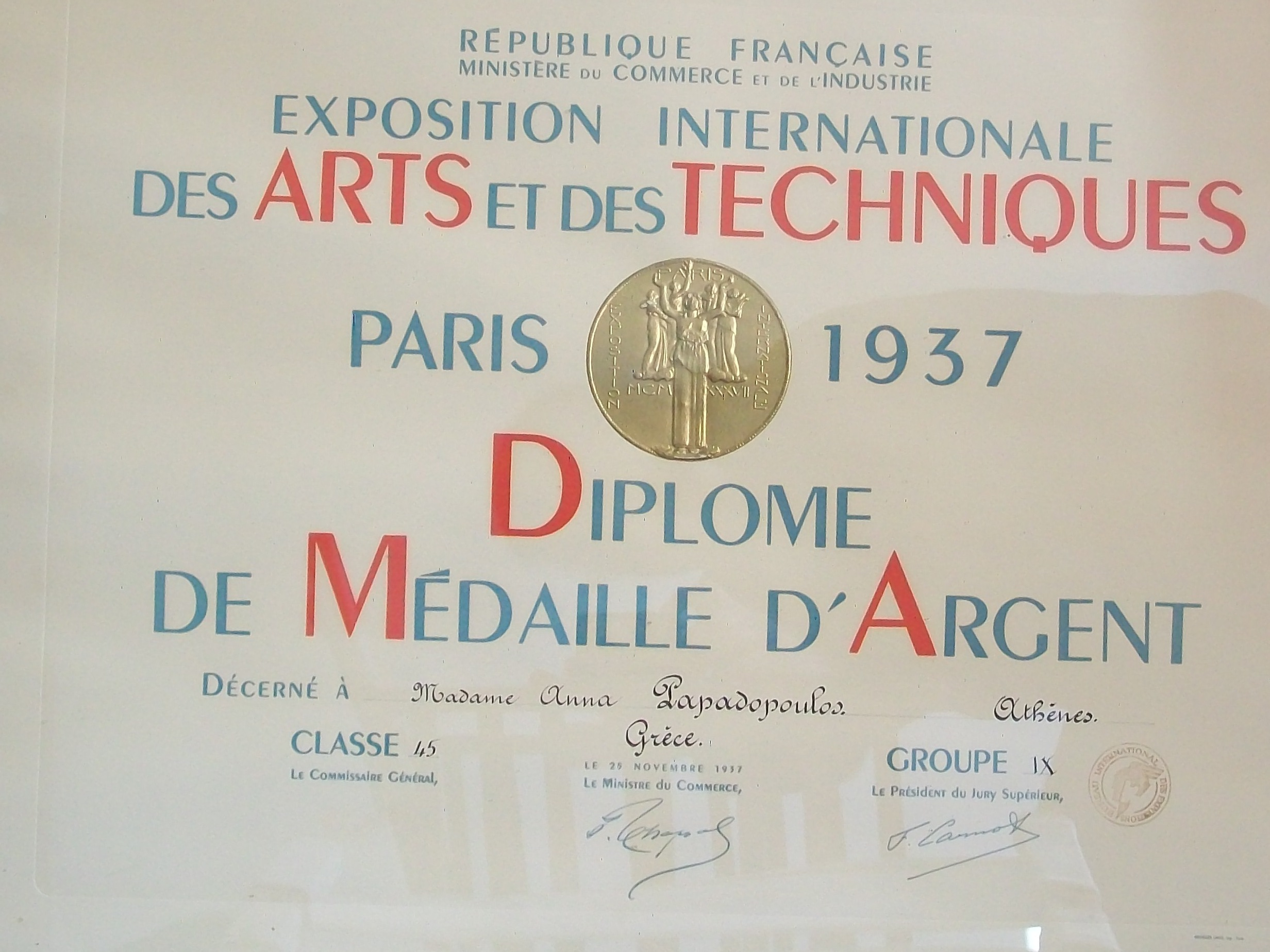
2nd Diploma Award at the "Exposition Internationale des Arts et Techniques" in Paris 1937

Anna Mela-Papadopoulou was a daughter of Michail Melas. Her father was an ardent patriot, proud of his descent from Epirus, that was still under the Turkish rule. He loved the arts and encouraged her talent in painting. One of her brothers was Pavlos Melas. His death and the tragic – for the family – circumstances under which it occurred, deeply affected his sister and influenced her life. She left her two teenaged children to her husband's care and the village in Euboea, where he was the local landlord and where she had always devoted herself to welfare activities and she returned to Athens to work in larger charity schemes. Firstly, she organised a First Aid Polyclinic in Omonia Square and secondly a shop, called "The Progress", where women could sell their handicrafts and earn an income.

When the First Balkan War broke out on 11 September 1912, she enlisted as a volunteer nurse. She served in the Greek Army, at the war front, for a decade (1912–1922) throughout the two Balkan Wars, the Autonomous Republic of Northern Epirus Struggle, the Great War in Serbia, (Scopje) and the Asia Minor Campaign

For her work in Serbia as Head of the newly founded Greek Red Cross she was awarded in December 1914 with the Silver Cross of the Order of the Redeemer by the Greek State and in spring of 1915 with the Serbian Medal of Saint Andrew by the Serb King and with the Cross of the Empress Elisabeth of Austria, for her services to the wounded and ill Serb soldiers and their Austrian captives. She was awarded with the Silver Medal award for virtue and self-sacrifice by the Academy of Athens. She was honored with 28 medals in total.

She dedicated her post-war life to the struggle against tuberculosis from which the refugees from the Asia Minor Disaster but also the retired fighters suffered. She raised funds for the construction of a wing at the Sotiria (Salvation) Hospital for Thoracic Diseases in Athens.

In 1927, she travelled to Egypt and the United States of America and visited the Greek Communities there, to raise funds for the construction of a Sanatorium in the Peloponnese at Korfoxilia, in Arcadia, near Vytina and Magouliana. Eventually she succumbed to tuberculosis herself. Her grave is at Rovies near Limni of Evia.
