= Carmela Jeria Gómez =

Chilean labour activist, typesetter and editor

Carmela Jeria's feminist workers' newspaper, La Alborada. This issue was published in Santiago, Chile.

Carmela Jeria (born Carmela Jeria Gómez in Valparaíso, Chile, July 16, 1886 – ?) was a labor activist, typographer, publisher, and social and feminist leader. Called the "first working journalist" of her country, she was the founder of La Alborada, the first feminist worker newspaper published in Chile.

== Social unrest ==
Working conditions at the turn of the century were very precarious and led to the formation of many workers' organizations as Chile began exploiting its natural resources. Its economy was almost 50% dependent on saltpeter. The resulting economic development generated a new social structure in the country, a product of the worker migration and the growing use of female and child labor. A series of labor disputes erupted with workers demanding better wages and more limited working hours.

Many of these outbursts were brutally repressed by the police and government forces with many fatalities. Two of the many uprisings were Red Week (sometimes called the meat riots) in 1905 and the Santa Maria School massacre (also called, massacre at the Santa María de Iquique School) on December 21, 1907, which fueled even more worker activism.

== Feminist and publisher ==
Carmela Jeria's parents were Maria Gómez and a well known policeman and "intellectual agent" Mauricio Jeria of Valparaiso. Carmela worked as a typographical worker in the Gillet Lithograph Company and learned about newspapers from the inside. At a young age, she became a vocal member of the labor movement.

At the age of 19, Jeria founded a new feminist newspaper, La Alborada (in English, The Dawn), making her the first woman in Chile to become a working journalist. She published bi-monthly editions starting September 10, 1905 from Valparaiso. After a few issues, production paused before resuming in the nation's capital city, Santiago, on November 11, 1906 as a weekly publication and with the words “Feminist Newspaper” on the masthead.

Jeria's first editorial, which she signed Carmela Jeria G., says: "La Alborada is born into journalistic life, with the sole and exclusive purpose of defending the proletarian class and more particularly the working-class... working with tireless and ardent determination for the moral, material and intellectual advancement of the working woman and also for our brothers in suffering." The editor goes on to say, "We ardently wish that women will one day reach the level of advancement of men."

Using the printed page, Jeria spread political ideas related to the rights of workers and especially working women, denouncing the different means of "oppression" that restricted them, as well as the importance of female participation in the organization of labor movements. She often wrote specifically about the day-to-day struggle of female workers and the need to target a woman's liberation.

A proponent of female education, Jeria said that women's education should not be limited to training better-prepared mothers. She regularly published articles describing the plight of working women and men (those committed to educating and emancipating women), citing the "fight against violence towards women and the 'slavery of working women.'"

== May Day speaker ==
On May 1, 1907, Jeria delivered a labor day speech to 40,000 people, but by doing so she lost her job at Gillet Lithograph, reportedly because of her work as a labor leader and working journalist.

La Alborada's last issue appeared shortly thereafter on May 19, 1907, when Jeria was almost 21 years old, about two years after she started the publication.

== Impact ==
On May 1, 1908, a new labor newspaper, La Palanca, was launched by Carmela's friend, feminist and activist Esther Valdés de Díaz, a promoter of the Association of Seamstresses. In her first editorial, the publisher acknowledged the groundbreaking work of La Alborada but noted that Carmela had suffered the “destruction of her home, and an uninterrupted series of troubles" which, in addition to "long and cruel illness", had "forced her to interrupt her noble crusade”. The editor went on to say that she knew nothing of her friend's life after that time, but that Jeria had inspired disciples who would continue her work.

Jeria's work is said to have contributed to the formation of several women's associations dedicated to the suffrage movement, eventually leading to Chilean women gaining the right to vote in municipal elections in 1934, and in presidential elections in 1952.
