= Carmela Gross =

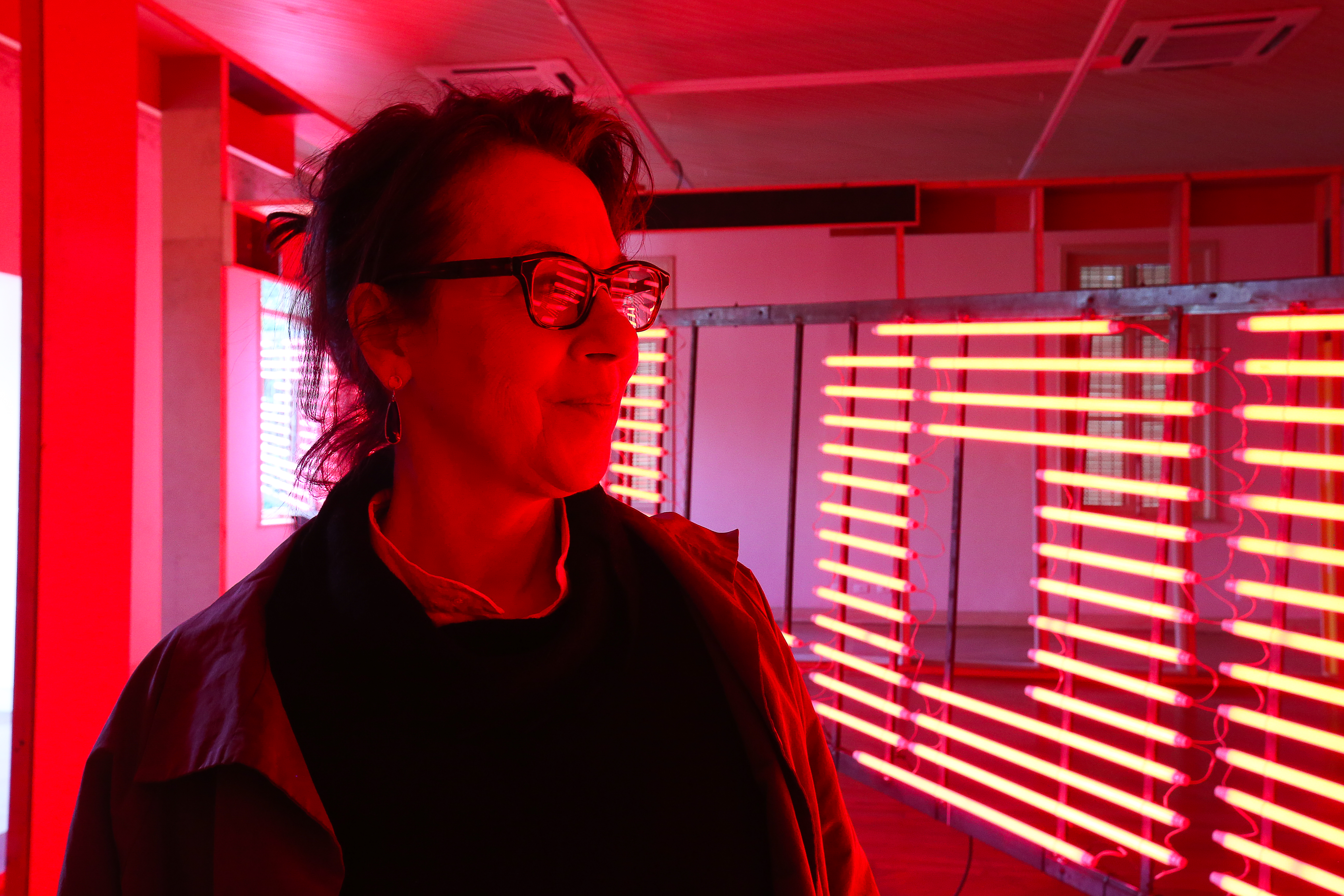
- Born: Maria do Carmo da Costa Gross; February 16, 1946 (age 80); São Paulo
- Education: Fundação Armando Álvares Penteado
- Known for: Visual arts
- Style: Avant-garde
- Website: www.carmelagross.com

Carmela Gross (born 1946) is a Brazilian visual artist and educator. She is noted for her avant-garde productions on visual arts that focus on drawing, architecture and the urban landscape.

Her artistic production reflects a sharp and critical perspective on the contemporary city in its political and social dimensions. The common thread, beyond the diversity of contexts and proposed works, lies in the relationship between art and the city. The set of operations involved—from the conception of the work to the production process and its placement in the exhibition space—emphasizes the dialectical relationship between the artwork and urban space, as well as between the artwork and the public/passersby.

== Biography ==
Gross was born Maria do Carmo da Costa Gross in São Paulo in February 1946. She completed her Fine Arts degree at the Fundação Armando Álvares Penteado in 1969. This course was founded on the idea of drawing as a project and the construction of social forms of freedom and emancipation.

Her early work as an educator, addressing the challenges of art education in the late 1960s, took place in public squares on Sundays, where she organized artistic activities for children (1966–1971, Praça Dom José Gaspar and Ibirapuera Park, São Paulo). She also taught at the Escola de Belas Artes de São Paulo (1971–72 and 1981–84) and at the University of São Paulo, in the Department of Visual Arts (1972–2015), where she worked as a professor and supervising professor to artists and researchers.

In 1981, she obtained her master’s degree, and in 1987, her doctorate, both under the supervision of Walter Zanini.

== Artistic career ==
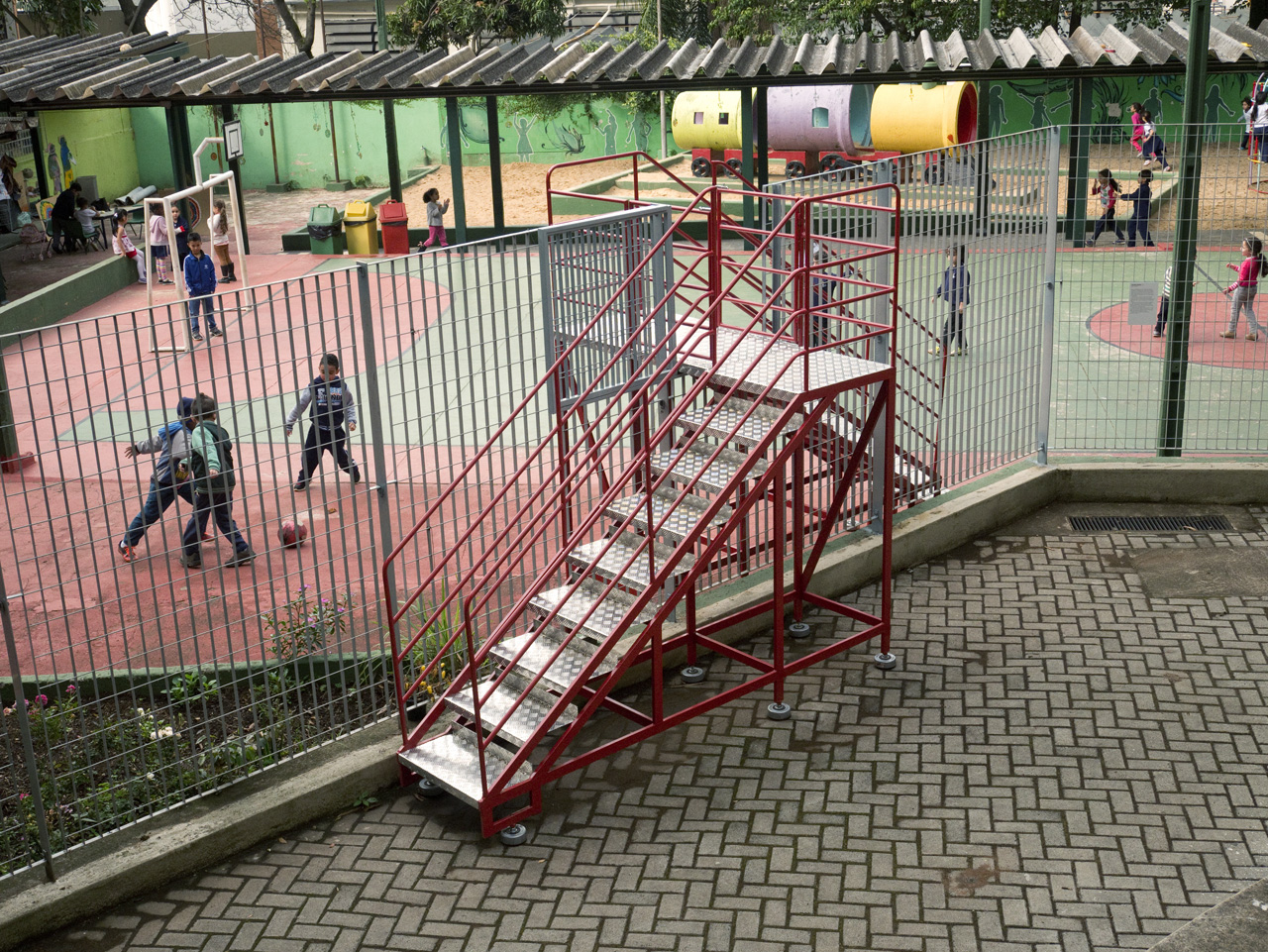
Escada escola

Gross belongs to a generation of artists who began working in the late 1960s and early 1970s—a period marked by resistance against censorship and state violence under Brazil’s military dictatorship.

During this time, Gross, alongside many artists of her generation, engaged in collective actions in public spaces, on the streets, and in alternative venues, promoting events that included performance, happening, theater, video, and film. The incorporation of everyday practices and elements into artistic creation, along with a break from traditional artistic categories and a strong drive for new aesthetic experiments, led to a wave of innovative practices outside museums and the conventional art circuit.

This period saw initiatives such as Arte na Praça (drawing and painting classes for children and teenagers, offered free of charge on Sundays at Dom José Gaspar Square, in São Paulo), Bandeiras na Praça (a demonstration with banners created by a group of artists at Praça General Osório in Rio de Janeiro), and the intervention Escada (1968) in the outskirts of São Paulo. Also from this time are the works presented at the 10th São Paulo International Biennial in 1969: A Carga [The Load], Presunto [Ham], A Pedra [The rock], and Barril [Barrel], created from raw and repurposed materials found in the city, such as mattresses, truck tarps, barrels, straw, and plastic. Those art productions did not only focus on the sculptures but also the connotation of threat and danger. Notable pieces in this exhibition include Presunto ("Ham") and Barril ("Barrel"), which explored the urban landscape characterized by ambivalence between opacity and morbidity.

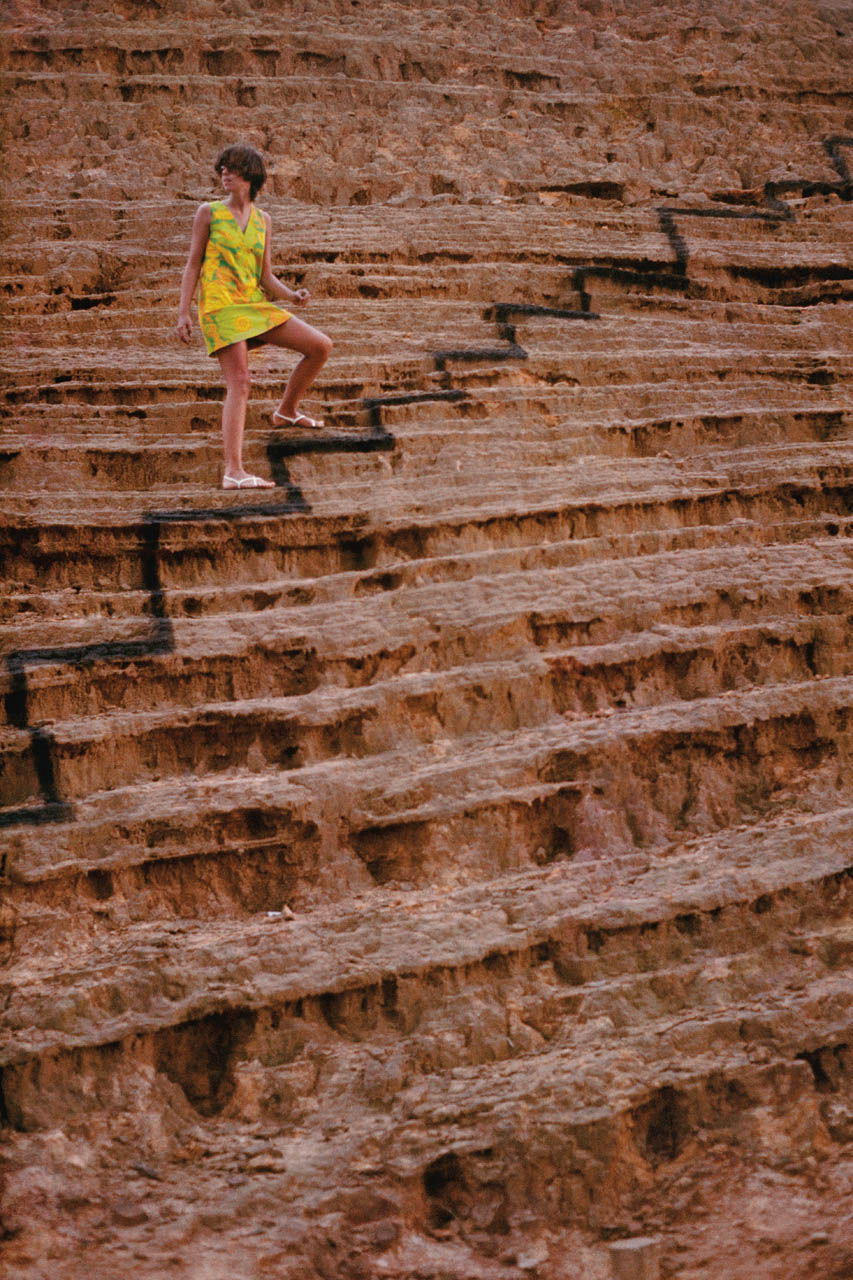

Escada, 1968

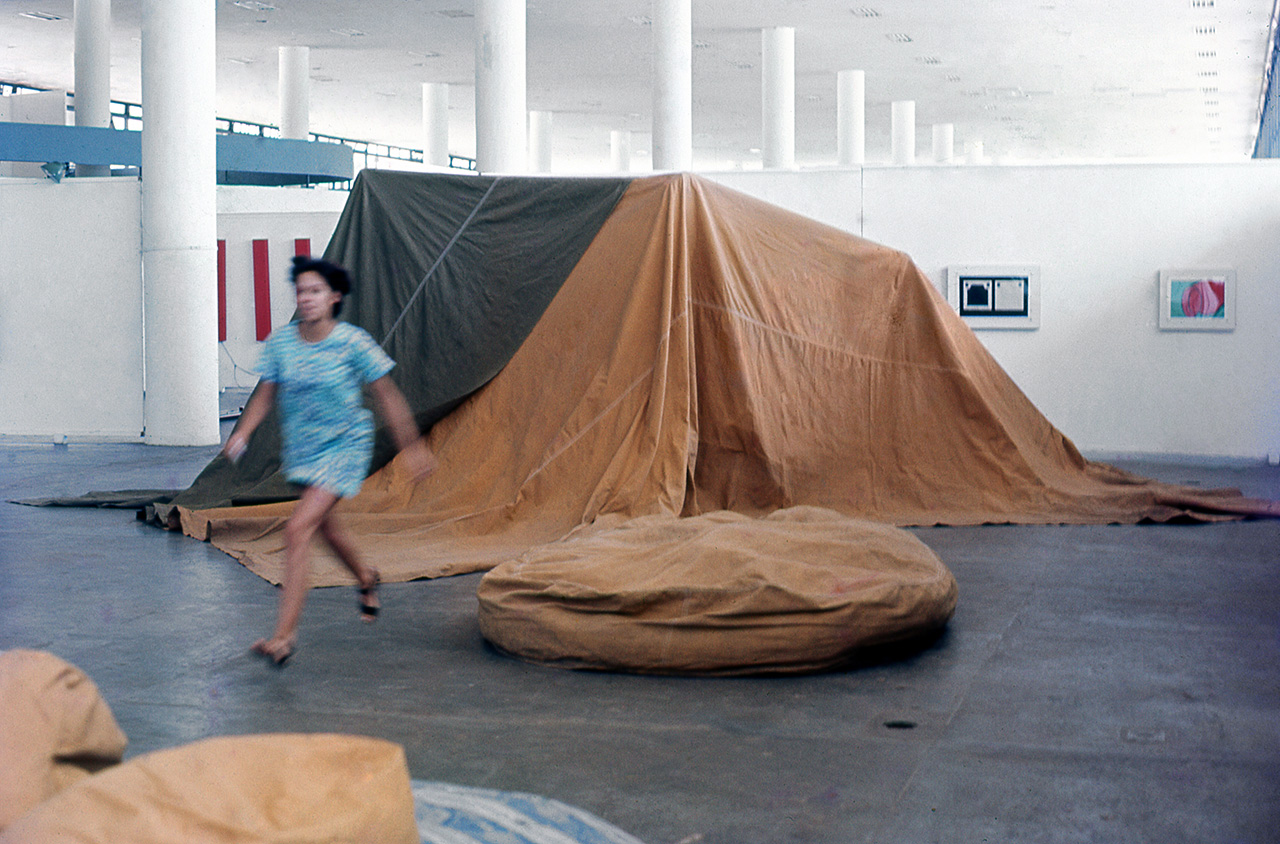

The Load and Ham, 1969

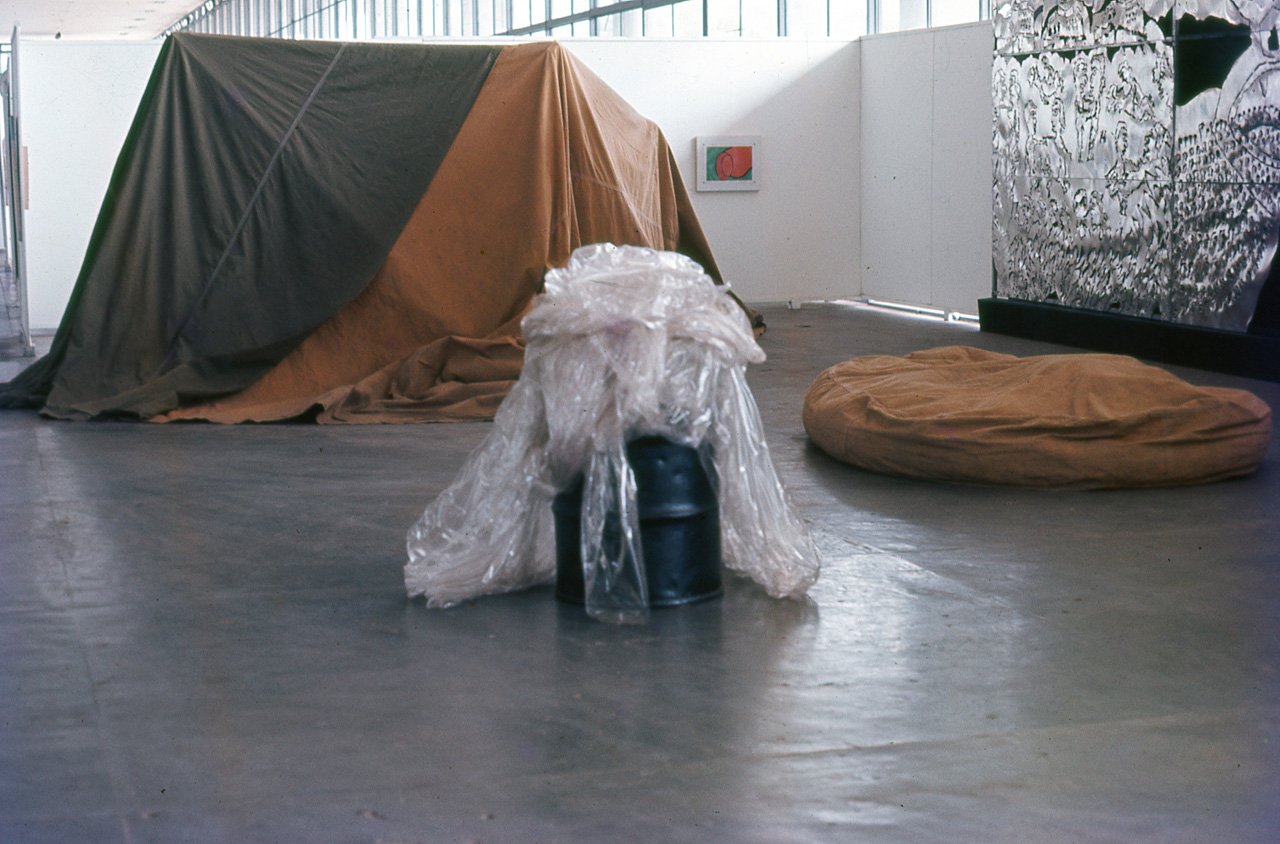

The Load, Barrel and Ham, 1969

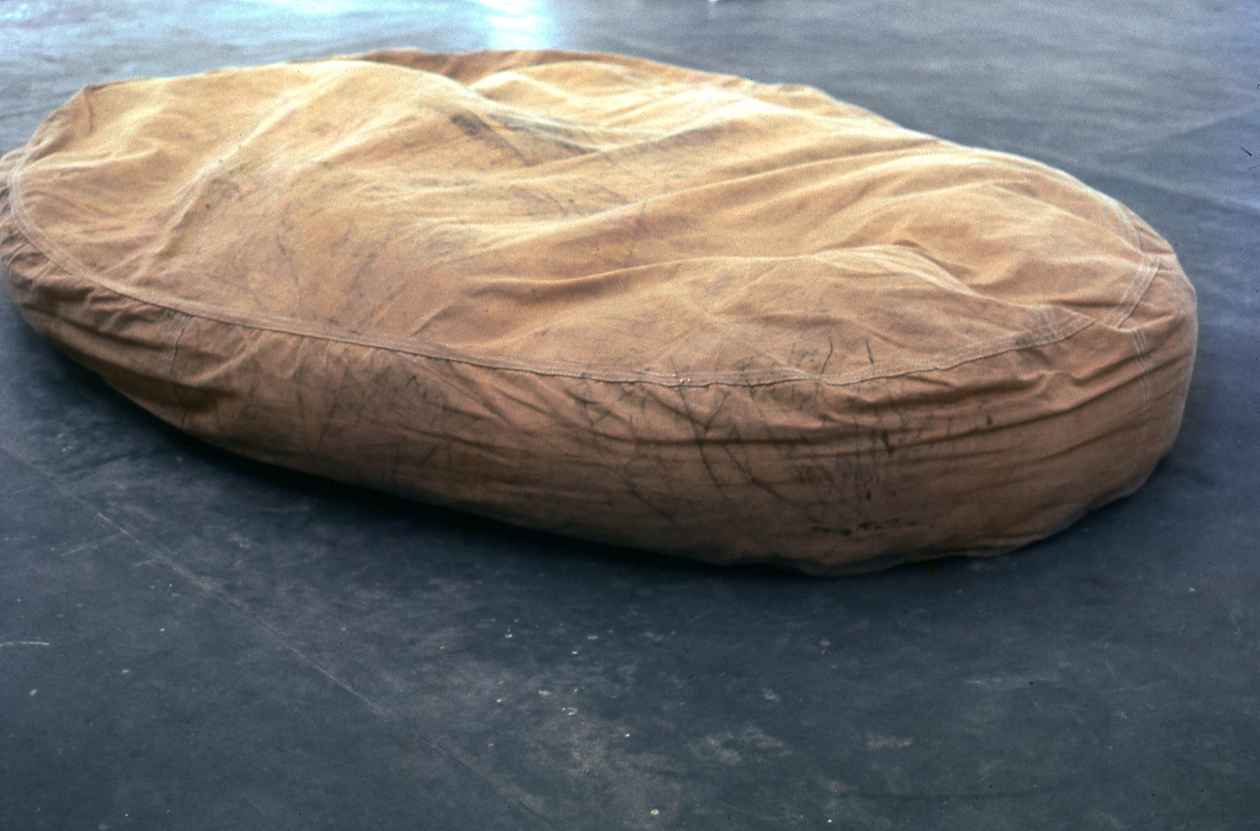

Ham, 1969

Also in 1969, the artist joined Paulo Mendes da Rocha’s team for the Brazilian Pavilion project at the Osaka International Expo in Japan, alongside Flávio Motta, Marcelo Nitsche, Jorge Caron, Júlio Katinsky, and Ruy Ohtake.

The experimental nature of her work and its relationship with the city deeply shape Gross’s creative process. Her works seek to generate new artistic perceptions that affirm critical action and thought, bringing to light the semantic weight of a given place—whether a public space, an institution, or the context of an exhibition.

Between the 1970s and 1980s, her work evolved through the exploration of materials, techniques, and multimedia processes, their combinations, and different modes of production. The underlying element in these operations is drawing, understood as a trace, sketch, and project—“a mark of gestures, thoughts, and processes that solidify in the work.” In 1977, she produced a video featuring a black gouache composed of images depicted on the screen orthogonally, connoting a prison.

From this period, notable series include Carimbos [Stamps] (1978), the drawings in Projeto para a construção de um céu [Project for the construction of a sky] (1981), Quasares [Quasars] (1983), and other works executed on various media such as billboards, heliographic prints, photocopies, videotext, and video, among others.

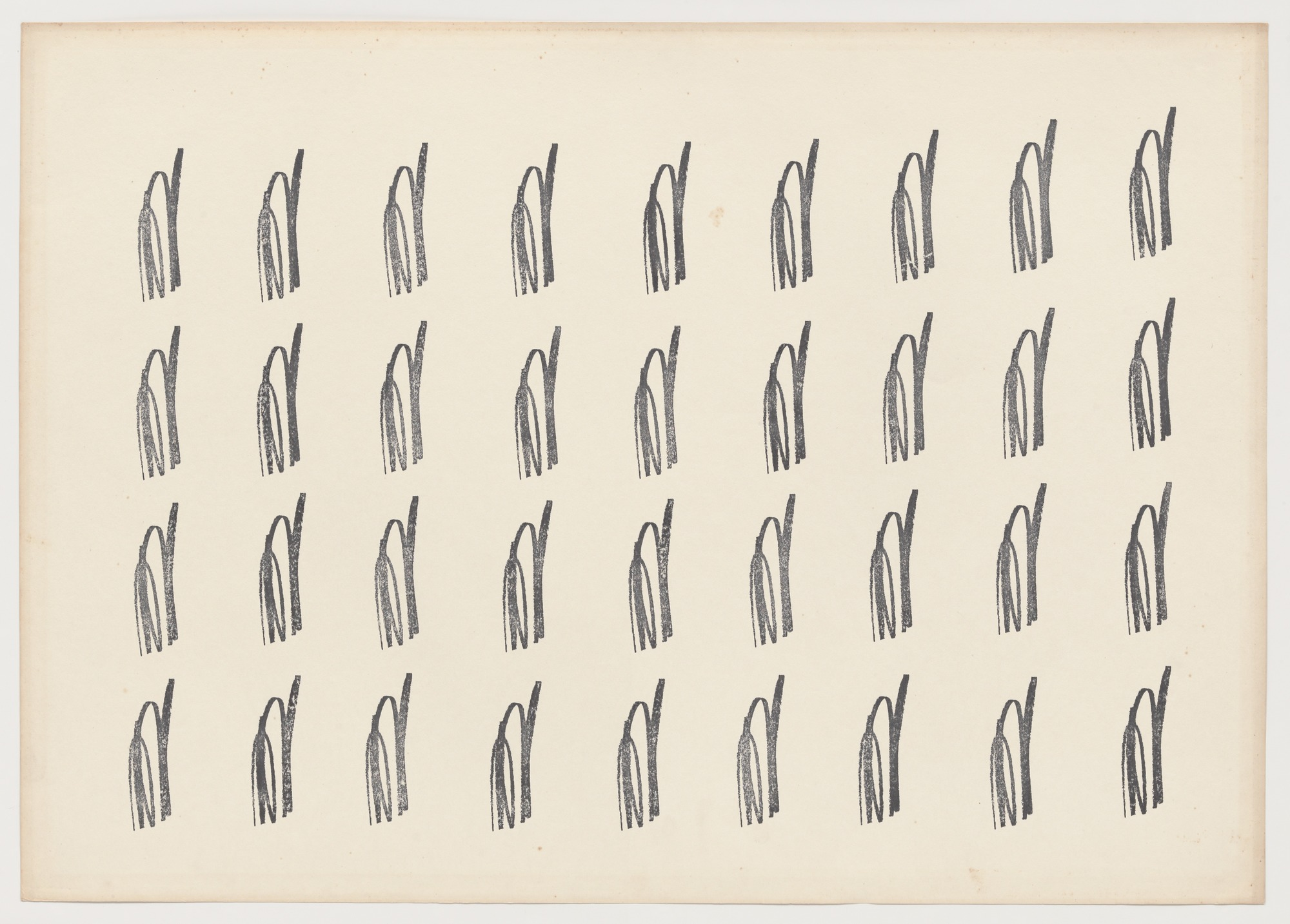

Stamps, Scribbles series, 1978

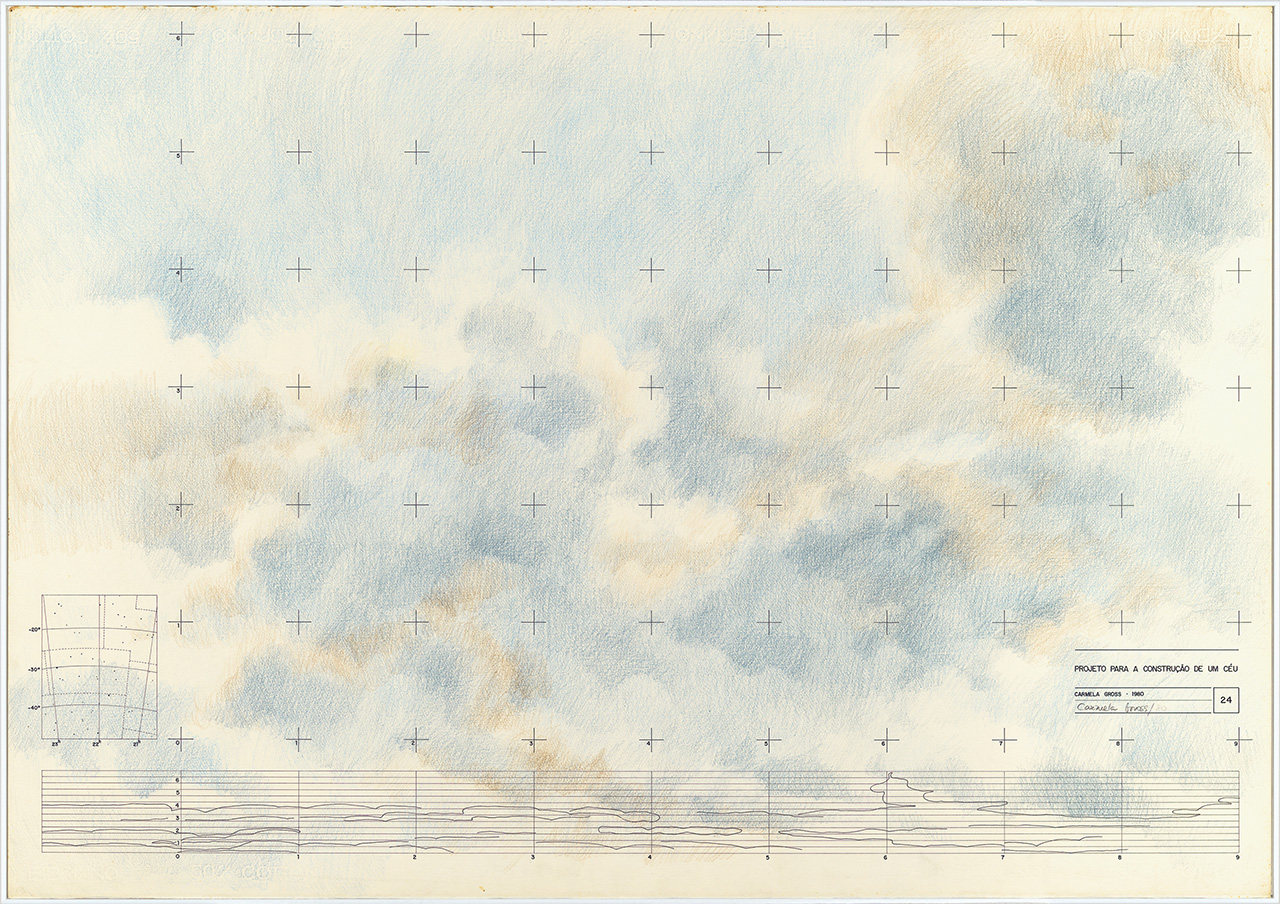

Project for the construction of a sky, 1981

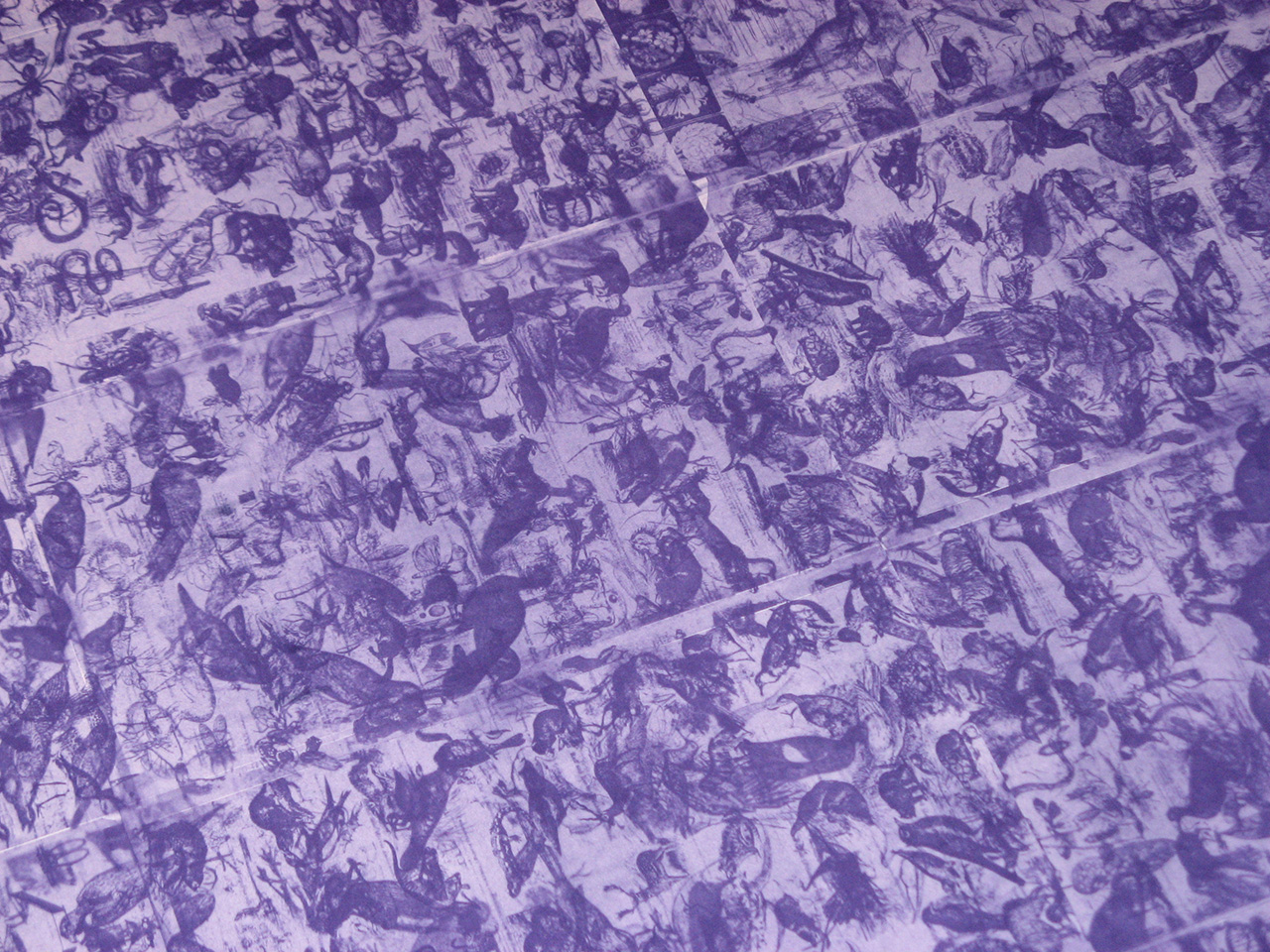

Body of ideas, 1981

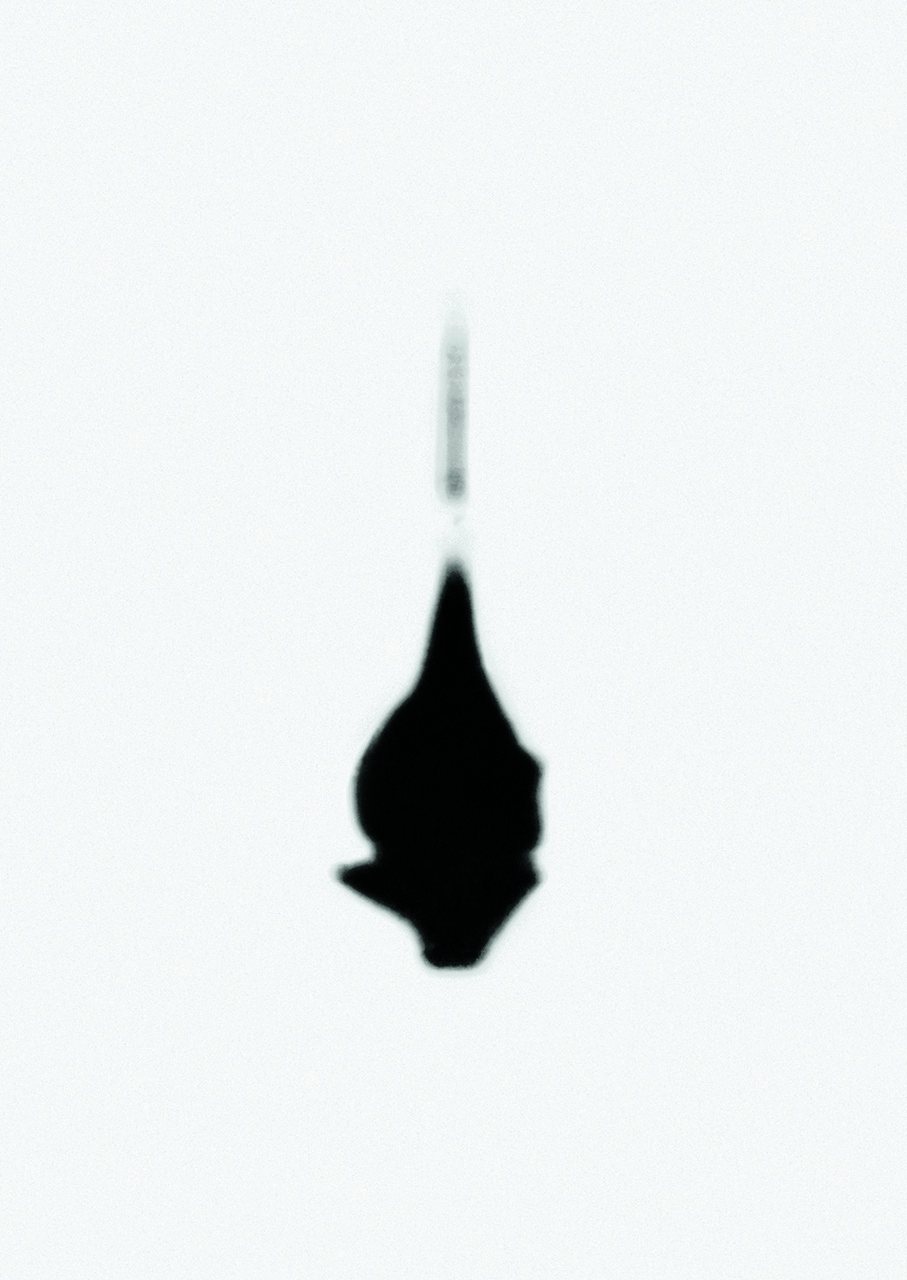

Quasars, 1983

Gross is known for her art installations that feature neon. A recent exhibition, for example, featured Figurantes/Extras, which focused on the apotheosis of war with its procession of doubtful figures. The figures included those listed by Karl Marx in The Eighteenth Brumaire of Louis Napoleon such as people without ambition, decadent ruffians, con men, and pickpockets, among others. She is also noted for her drawing, paintings, lithography, stamps, photocopies and video art. Early in her artistic career, she focused on productions exhibited in public spaces (e.g. Escada-Escola) and these often involved proposition of plastic activities for children as well as themes that explore education. Her art productions that use plastic also often articulate a critical look at the social and political dimensions of the modern urban landscape.

Gross's works have been chronicled by Ana Maria de Moraes Belluzzo, who elaborated on her response to the modern contradictions of art. Belluzo also cited the series of artworks called Quasares, which explored the dimensions that arise as consequences of recent industrialization and technology.
