= Elaeus (Bithynia) =

Trading place on the coast of Bithynia

Coordinates: 41°06′56″N 31°17′50″E

Elaeus or Elaious (Ancient Greek: Ἐλαιοῦς) or Elaios (Ἐλαῖος) was an emporium or trading place on the coast of Bithynia at the mouth of a river of the same name. Elaeus was 120 stadia west of Cales.

It is located on the north coast of modern Turkey, at the mouth of its name-sake river.
