= Cales (Bithynia) =

Emporium on the coast of ancient Bithynia

Coordinates: 41°10′55″N 31°23′15″E

Cales or Kales (Ancient Greek: Κάλης), also Calles or Kalles (Κάλλης), was an emporium or trading place on the coast of ancient Bithynia at the mouth of a river of the same name. Cales was 120 stadia east of Elaeus.

It is located near Alaplı in Asiatic Turkey.
