= List of Panathinaikos F.C. presidents =

Until 1979 the President of Panathinaikos A.C. was responsible for all the athletic departments. Since 1979 the football club became professional and independent with its own president. The same happened later for the basketball team (1992) and the volleyball team (2001). The following is a list of presidents of the football team from the foundation of the club in 1908 to the present day.

As of 2022 Giannis Alafouzos is the current president.

Presidency No.	Name	From	To	Notes
1	Alexandros Kalafatis	1908	1908	Brother of founder Giorgos Kalafatis
2	Marinos Marinakis	1908	1909	
3	Euthymios Chrysis	1910	1910	
4	Georgios Vratsanos	1911	1911	
5	Ioannis Masvoulas	1912	1912	
6	Georgios Gennimatas	1913	1913	
7	Georgios Tsochas	1914	1918	
8	Christos Merisimitzakis	1919	1919	
9	Nikolaos Kyriakidis	1920	1920	
10	Georgios Chatzopoulos	1921	1921	
11	Panos Savvidis	1922	1923	
12	Pantelis Karasevdas	1924	1926	
13	Dimitrios Damaskinos	1927	1927	
14	Pantelis Karasevdas	1928	1930	
15	Nikolaos Ksiros	1931	1933	
16	Georgios Giannoulatos	1934	1934	
17	Georgios Tsochas	1935	1936	
18	Konstantinos Kotzias	1937	1939	
19	Georgios Kozonis	1940	1940	
20	Evangelos Stamatis	1941	1944	
21	Konstantinos Kotzias	1945	1951	
22	Ioannis Moatsos	1952	1961	
23	Loukas Panourgias	1962	1966	
24	Matthaios Koumarianos	1967	1968	
25	Georgios Asimakopoulos	1969	1969	
26	Georgios Merikas	1970	1970	
27	Dimitrios Chamosfakitis	1971	1971	
28	Michail Kitsios	1971	1972	
29	Spyridon Anestis	1973	1973	
30	Ioannis Oikonomopoulos	1974	1974	
31	Apostolos Nikolaidis	1974	1979	
32	Jack Nikolaidis	1979	1979	
33	Yiorgos Vardinogiannis	1979	2000	First president of independent football club
34	Angelos Filippidis	2000	2003	
35	Argiris Mitsou	2003	2008	
36	Nikolaos Pateras	26 May 2008	21 May 2010	
37	Nikos Konstantopoulos	13 July 2010	8 September 2010	
38	Nikolaos Pateras	8 September 2010	20 December 2010	
39	Ioannis Vekris	December 2010	January 2011	
40	Dimitris Gontikas	August 2011	25 September 2012	
41	Giannis Alafouzos	25 September 2012	21 April 2017	
42	Manos Mavrokoukoulakis	21 April 2017	29 September 2017	
43	Vasilis Konstantinou	29 September 2017	25 February 2019	
44	Manos Mavrokoukoulakis	25 February 2019	11 July 2022	
45	Giannis Alafouzos	11 July 2022	present	

== Gallery ==
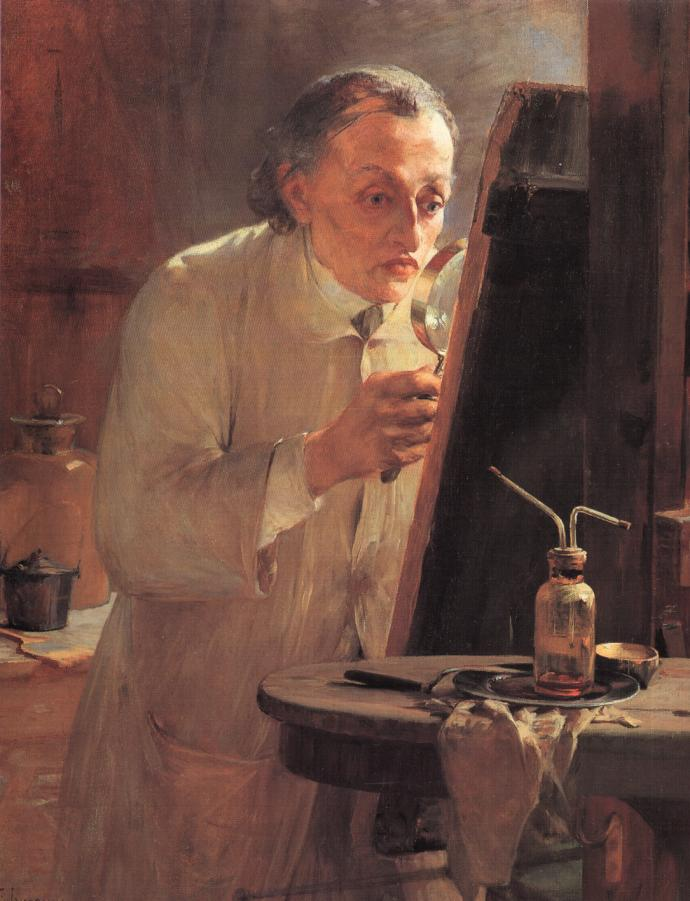
Georgios Chatzopoulos, painter and director of the National Gallery

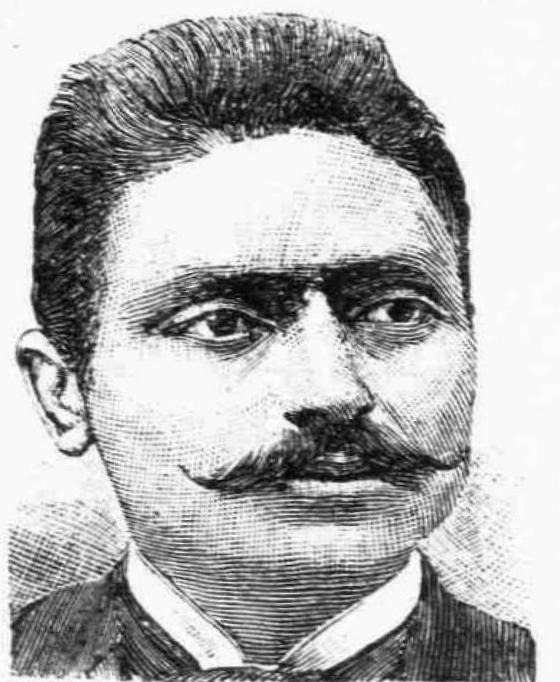
Pantelis Karasevdas, a gold medalist at the 1896 Summer Olympics
