= List of Panathinaikos AO presidents =

Until 1979 the President of Panathinaikos A.C. was responsible for all the athletic departments. Since 1979 the football club became professional and independent with its own president. The same happened later for the basketball team (1992) and the volleyball team (2001). The following is a list of presidents of Panathinaikos A.C. from the foundation of the club in 1908 to the present day.

As of 2018 Nikos Plitas is the current president.

Name	From	To	Notes
Alexandros Kalafatis	1908	1908	Brother of founder Giorgos Kalafatis
Marinos Marinakis	1908	1909	
Euthymios Chrysis	1910	1910	
Georgios Vratsanos	1911	1911	
Ioannis Masvoulas	1912	1912	
Georgios Gennimatas	1913	1913	
Georgios Tsochas	1914	1918	
Christos Merisimitzakis	1919	1919	
Nikolaos Kyriakidis	1920	1920	
Georgios Chatzopoulos	1921	1921	
Panos Savvidis	1922	1923	
Pantelis Karasevdas	1924	1926	
Dimitrios Damaskinos	1927	1927	
Pantelis Karasevdas	1928	1930	
Nikolaos Ksiros	1931	1933	
Georgios Giannoulatos	1934	1934	
Georgios Tsochas	1935	1936	
Konstantinos Kotzias	1937	1939	
Georgios Kozonis	1940	1940	
Evangelos Stamatis	1941	1944	
Konstantinos Kotzias	1945	1951	
Ioannis Moatsos	1952	1961	
Loukas Panourgias	1962	1966	
Matthaios Koumarianos	1967	1968	
Georgios Asimakopoulos	1969	1969	
Georgios Merikas	1970	1970	
Dimitrios Chamosfakitis	1971	1971	
Michael Kitsios	1971	1972	
Spyridon Anestis	1973	1973	
Ioannis Oikonomopoulos	1974	1974	
Apostolos Nikolaidis	1974	1979	
Jack Nikolaidis	1979	1983	First president not being responsible for the football club
Makis Ithakisios	1983	1987	
Paulos Giannakopoulos	1987	1997	
Thodoris Aloupis	1997	1999	
Thanasis Giannakopoulos	1999	2009	
Michael Kitsios	2009	2010	
Nikos Risvas	2010	2011	Administration appointed by the court
Achilleas Makropoulos	2011	2013	
Ilias Michalarias	2013	2016	
Dimitris Baltakos	2016	2017	Resigned on June 4, 2017
Takis Ikonomopoulos	2017	2018	Administration appointed by the court. Resigned on January 13, 2018.
Nikos Plitas	2018	2018	Interim president
Dimitrios Giannakopoulos	2018	2020	Elected on June 8, 2018
Panagiotis Malakates	2020	Present	Elected on July 7, 2020

== Gallery ==
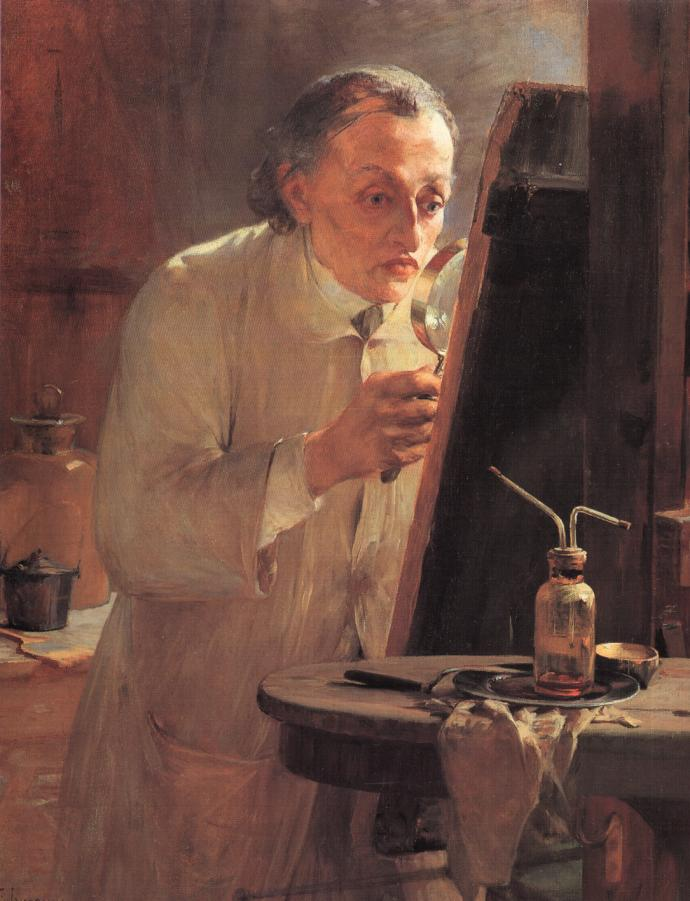
Georgios Chatzopoulos, painter and director of the National Gallery

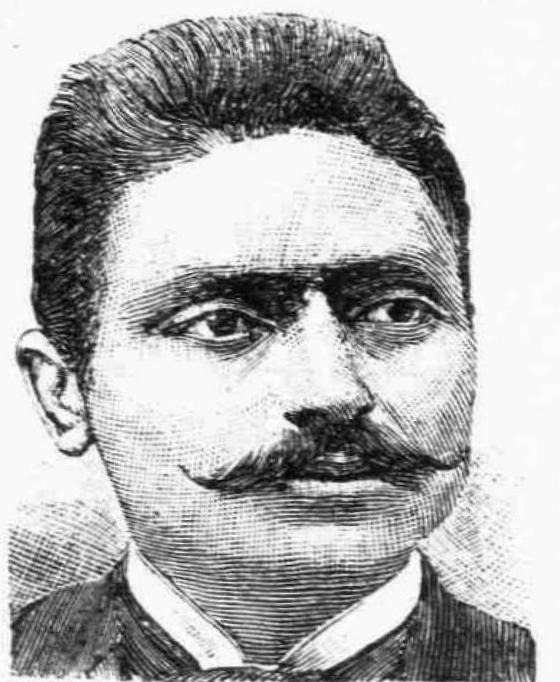
Pantelis Karasevdas, a gold medalist at the 1896 Summer Olympics
