= Hellenic Football Federation =

Association football governing body in Greece

UEFA
- Short name: H.F.F.
- Founded: 14 November 1926; 100 years ago
- Headquarters: Athens, Greece
- FIFA affiliation: 1927; 99 years ago
- UEFA affiliation: 15 June 1954; 72 years ago
- President: Chrysostomos Gkagkatsis
- Website: www.epo.gr

The Hellenic Football Federation (H.F.F.; Greek: Ελληνική Ποδοσφαιρική Ομοσπονδία; Ε.Π.Ο., romanized: Ellinikí Podosferikí Omospondía; E.P.O.) is the governing body of association football and futsal in Greece. It contributes in the organizations of the Greek Cup, Gamma Ethniki (3rd ranked men's football championship in Greece), the Greece national team and from 2025-26 season for the Greek Super Cup.

== History ==
Old crest (1994–2005)

The Hellenic Football Federation (H.F.F.) was founded on 14 November 1926 by a decision of the three major Football Clubs Associations of Greece: Athens F.C.A., Piraeus F.C.A. and Macedonia F.C.A.. Its foundation marked the organization of Greek football in compliance with international standards. Since then, the HFF has grown into the biggest sports federation in Greece, as football in the country is regarded as the "king of sports" coming first in the preferences of sports fans.

The HFF is considered a private legal entity and a non-profit organization with registered offices in Athens. It is the only exclusively qualified body in Greece to represent the interests of Greek football and prohibits any political, religious or racial discrimination.

In 1927, the HFF became a member of FIFA and in 1954 became one of the first members of UEFA. Amongst its obligations as member of international sports bodies, the HFF accepts the statutes, regulations, directives and decisions issued by FIFA and UEFA. The HFF also has to ensure that they are accepted by all individuals and clubs in Greek football.

On 3 July 2006, FIFA ruled the HFF was failing to adhere to the principles of the FIFA statutes regarding FIFA's political independence. Accordingly, the HFF was indefinitely suspended from international football. In response, Greek officials proposed a change in FIFA's law. However, FIFA ruled it too constituted an interference of the government in matters that should be under the football federation's jurisdiction. As such, FIFA concluded Greece would not be able to meet its 15 July 2006 deadline and should therefore be suspended until further notice. The suspension would have meant Greek clubs would not be allowed to participate in international competitions, and that the Greece national team would not be able to participate in international matches. There were also doubts cast over whether the 2007 UEFA Champions League Final will be played at Athens' Olympic Stadium as previously scheduled.

However, on 7 July 2006, the Greek government ratified a new version of the sports law, granting the HFF independence and therefore adherence to FIFA's laws. FIFA announced the lifting of its ban that day, judging that the amendments adhered to FIFA and UEFA statutes. This allowed Greece to participate in UEFA Euro 2008 and also allowed Greek clubs to participate in European competitions.

On 11 December 2008, HFF president Vassilis Gagatsis resigned from his position after an eight-year tenure. New elections were held on 17 January 2009, making Giorgos Sarris the new president. However, Sarris' election was controversial, with reports claiming the election was not fair and that Olympiacos owner Evangelos Marinakis had allegedly using his power to help appoint Sarris.

In April 2013, the HFF announced its new partnership with Nike, which also became the official supplier of clothes and equipment for the Greece national team. On the eve of the announcement, Giorgos Sarris praised the new partnership hoping that "it will contribute to the overall advancement of domestic football".

== Milestones ==
- 1926: Foundation of the Hellenic Football Federation
- 1927: The Hellenic Football Federation becomes a member of FIFA
- 1954: The Hellenic Football Federation becomes one of the founding members of UEFA
- 2004: The Greek national team wins UEFA Euro 2004

=== Historic events ===
The HFF has organised major football events multiple times. Here is a list of all European competition finals held in Greece.

- 1971: European Cup Winners' Cup final, Chelsea – Real Madrid (1–0)
- 1973: European Cup Winners' Cup final, AC Milan – Leeds United (1–0)
- 1983: European Cup final, Hamburger SV – Juventus (1–0)
- 1987: European Cup Winners' Cup final, Ajax – Lokomotive Leipzig (1–0)
- 1994: Champions League final, AC Milan – Barcelona (4–0)
- 2007: Champions League final, AC Milan – Liverpool (2–1)
- 2024: Conference League final, Olympiacos – Fiorentina (1–0) (a.e.t)

== Organisation ==
=== Organisational structure ===
The structure of the HFF is pyramid shaped. It is based on 2,000,000 football players and 5,773 football clubs, 3,700 from which are actively participating in official competitions of every kind, which take place throughout the country, covering all ages. The clubs come under the 53 Regional Unions of Football Clubs. The professional competitions are being organized by the Professional League (Greek League). The HFF is the supreme football authority, the one that all the clubs and professional teams come under and forms the top of the pyramid.

The General Assembly, convening once a year, is actually the HFF parliament. It is the Assembly that, according to the Statutes, decides on everything about Greek football. They can change the Statutes and the regulations of the Federation, enforce new ones, audit the financial review for the previous fiscal year and the budget for the year to come, vote (every four years) and monitor the Administration's work.

=== Divisions ===
The divisions of H.F.F. are: The Sporting Division, the Management Division, the Finance and Marketing Division, the International Relations Division, and the Press and Mass Media Division.

=== Committees ===
The operation of H.F.F. relies on the above-mentioned divisions that function on the responsibility of their respective managers, as much as, the Committees of the Executive Board, which, according to the Statutes of the Federation, are the following:

- The Disciplinary Committee (first and second instance)
- The Appeal Committee
- The Financial Dispute Resolution Committee (second instance)
- The Central Referee's Committee, which comprises three members and controls the entire referee field in Greece
- The Players' Status-Transfer Committee

=== Standing Committees ===
1. Regulations Committee
2. International Relations Committee
3. Technical Committee
4. Greek Cup Committee
5. Procurements Committee
6. Divisions Committee
7. Selections Team Committee
8. Mass Media and Public Relations Committee
9. Legal Matters Committee
10. Violence Committee
11. Medical Committee
12. International Amateur Football Committee
13. Amateur Football Committee
14. Licensing Committee
15. Football Managers Committee
16. Training Board
17. Futsal (indoor football) Committee
18. Finance Committee
19. Statistics and Stadium Committee
20. Youth Amateur Football Committee
21. Women's Football Committee

The H.F.F. is responsible for doping control in all the Greek championships.

== Honours ==
=== Men's National Team ===
- UEFA European Championship

- Winners (1): 2004

=== Men's U21 ===
- UEFA European Under-21 Championship

- Runners-up (2): 1988, 1998

=== Men's U19 ===
- UEFA European Under-19 Championship

- Runners-up (2): 2007, 2012

== HFF presidents ==
Below are the presidents of HFF:

Name	Years
Apostolos Nikolaidis	1926–27
Marinos Marinakis	1927
Panagis Vryonis	1927–28
Ioannis Chrysafis	1928–29
Dimitrios Marselos	1929
Michalis Rinopoulos	1929
Konstantinos Kotzias	1929–30
Giorgos Kalafatis	1930
Dimitrios Marcelos	1930–32
Nikolaos Xiros	1932–33
Apostolos Nikolaidis	1933–34
Konastantinos Kastritsis	1934–36
Thanasis Mermigas	1936–37
Konstantinos Kotzias	1937–39
Thanasis Mermigas	1939–40
Panagis Vryonis	1940–41

Name	Years
Dimitris Karabatis	1943–46
Thanasis Mermigas	1946–68
Dimitris Vardanis	1968–69
Giorgos Dedes	1969–73
Dimitris Voyatzis	1973–74
Loukas Panourgias	1974–75
Vasilis Chatzigiannis	1975–85
Sotiris Alimisis	1985–90
Kostas Trivellas	1990–97
Sotiris Alimisis	1997–00
Kostas Alexandridis	2000–01
Vasilis Gagatsis	2001–08
Sofoklis Pilavios	2009–12
Giorgos Sarris	2012–14
Giorgos Girtzikis	2014–16
Evangelos Grammenos	2017–2021
Theodoros Zagorakis	2021
Panagiotis Dimitriou	2021–2022
Takis Baltakos	2022–2024

Name	Years
Chrysostomos Gkagkatsis	2024–

== Controversies ==
=== Koriopolis ===
The incident first came to light after UEFA issued a report, which drew attention to 40 matches that were rigged in Greek football in the 2009–10 season. The initial probe into the incident involved approximately 80 individuals suspected of wrongdoing. Olympiacos owner Evangelos Marinakis was also accused of using his position in Greek football and special relationship with the president of the HFF, to appoint favorable referees to matches. Marinakis was later acquitted from all charges by the Prosecutor and the Council of Judges and the decision is final.

In February 2012, the Super League Greece, with the agreement of the HFF, replaced the two football prosecutors (Fakos and Antonakakis) with two others (Petropoulos and Karras).

=== 2015 Greek football scandal ===
The 2015 Greek football scandal emerged on 6 April 2015 when prosecutor Aristidis Korreas' 173-page work was revealed. Telephone tapping operated by the National Intelligence Service of Greece since 2011 has played a significant role in the case. According to the prosecutor's conclusion, Olympiacos owner Evangelos Marinakis along with HFF members Theodoros Kouridis and Georgios Sarris, were suspected of directing a criminal organization since 2011. The goal behind their scheme was allegedly to "absolutely control Greek football's fate by the methods of blackmailing and fraud", exploiting the self-governing ("autonomy") status of national football federations promoted by FIFA and UEFA. In 2016, a temporary administration was placed by FIFA. On 28 December 2017 a new president was elected Evangelos Grammenos with the support of Savvidis and Melissanidis.

On 28 January 2021, the three-member Criminal Court of Appeals acquitted the leader of Olympiacos, Vangelis Marinakis, of all the charges against him in the trial of 28. The same happened with all the defendants in the case. After a thorough analysis of all the elements of the investigation, from the testimony of the witnesses (and the contradictions they encountered) and from the rejection of the pre-investigation conclusion by the lawyers of the accused, the court decided to reject all the accusations. A case that lasted almost six years and occupied Greek football, tarnishing reputations, has now been closed definitively and irrevocably.

=== Other ===
The HFF has also been subject to allegations of other crimes, including blackmail and tax evasion. In November 2013, a team of prosecutors raided the headquarters of the HFF to find evidence of illegal activity. There have been allegations some of the teams have failed to pay their taxes by submitting fake documents.

Since 2015, the HFF has also been under judicial investigation regarding the existence of a "pyramid's economic scheme" in the Greek referees' society.

Giorgos Girzikis, ex-president of the HFF, is also under penal prosecution for three felony economic crimes.

In March 2019, the ex-presidents of HFF, Vasilis Gagatsis, Sofoklis Pilavios and Giorgos Girtzikis were found guilty by the Greek courts for economic crimes.
