= Alexandros Kantakouzinos =

Phanariote Romanian-Greek magnate and politician

Alexandru Cantacuzino-Deleanu or Alexandros Kantakouzinos (Greek: Αλέξανδρος Καντακουζηνός: c. 1787 in Iași, Moldavia – 1841 in Athens, Greece) was a Phanariote Romanian-Greek magnate and politician.

== Biography ==
Alexandros Kantakouzinos was born in Iași, in the principality of Moldavia, as a younger son of the boyar Matei Cantacuzino-Deleanu (c. 1750 – c. 1817), justiciar of Moldavia and state councillor of the Russian Empire, and his wife princess Ralou ('Rhalouka', 'Ralitza') Callimachi (1763–1837). Matei Cantacuzino belonged to the Phanariote Greek Cantacuzino family, which had long settled in the Danubian Principalities.

Alexandros Kantakouzinos was born during the Russo-Turkish War of 1787–1792, during which Russia occupied parts of the Danubian Principalities for several years. In 1791, Matei Cantacuzino entered Russian service, and the family followed the departing Russian troops to the Russian Empire. Alexandros Kantakouzinos served as a chamberlain to the Russian tsar. As young man, he married the Ukrainian noblewoman Elisabeta Darahan, a grand-niece of the last Hetman of Ukraine, the last sovereign lord of the Zaporozhian Cossacks. The matrimony made Alexandros a married-in-member of the influential Rozumovski clan – his wife's cousins, who at this time held such eminent positions as Ambassador to the Austrian court in Vienna, and Minister of Education in St. Petersburg. His brother, Grigore Cantacuzino-Deleanu served in the Imperial Russian Army and rose to the rank of colonel, before being killed in the Battle of Borodino in 1812 against Napoleon's invasion of Russia.

In 1812, after another Russo-Turkish war, Eastern Moldavia was annexed to the Russian Empire, and Alexandros' father, his mother and his siblings and their families returned to their ancestral home. In 1821, along with his brother Gheorghe (1786–1857), Alexandros joined the forces of Alexandros Ypsilantis, the leader of the Greek secret society Filiki Etaireia, when he crossed the Pruth into Moldavia and launched an anti-Ottoman revolt. The rebellion in the Danubian Principalities was swiftly crushed, but before its final defeat, Ypsilantis sent his younger brother Dimitrios along with Alexandros Kantakouzinos to the Peloponnese in Greece, where a parallel rebellion had broken out in March.

Kantakouzinos participated in the capture of Monemvasia and the Siege of Tripolitsa, but in 1822 he fell out with Dimitrios Ypsilantis and joined the camp of his rival, the Phanariote Alexandros Mavrokordatos. He later left Greece and settled in Dresden. He returned to Greece in 1829, after Count Ioannis Kapodistrias became Governor of Greece. As Greek independence became internationally recognized, he bought up the estates (çifliks) of several Ottoman grandees in Attica, most notably the mufti of Athens and Omer Pasha of Karystos, from whom he purchased Tatoi (the future summer residence of the Greek royal family).

Alexandros Kantakouzinos died in 1841 in Athens.

== Family ==
His children included:

- Elpis (Nadine) Kantakouzini, (before 1820 – 7 January 1883), heiress of some of her father's estates, such as Tatoi, in 1834 she married the Phanariote general Skarlatos Soutsos (1808–1887)
- Helene Kantakouzini (1819–1845) wife of Count Maurice O'Donnell of Tyrconnell
- Matthaios Kantakouzinos (1809–1842)
- Mikael Kantakouzenos (1812–1881), marshal of nobility of Bessarabia, an officer in the Greek and Russian military and a politician in Romania, married with countess Louise Armansperg (c 1817–1835), eldest daughter of count Josef Ludwig von Armansperg, Prime Minister of Greece
- Alexandru Cantacuzino (1813–1884), author, lawyer in Bucharest and Foreign Minister of Romania.
- Dimitrios Kantakouzinos (1817–1877), Greek Army officer and husband of countess Sophia Armansperg, heiress of Loham, sister of the abovementioned Louise, and co-heiress of estates in Bavaria and Austria such as their seat the Schloss Egg as well as Breitenried in Austria. The two countesses, sisters Armansperg, had a double wedding while their father was a leader of Greek politics.
- Alexandros Kantakouzinos, the maternal grandfather of the writer Elisa Soutzos (1837–1887) and of Dimitrios Soutzos (1846–1904), mayor of Athens (1879..1887).
