= Kotzias =

Kotzias (Greek: Κοτζιάς) is a Greek surname. It is the surname of:

- Konstantinos Kotzias (1892–1951), Greek olympic fencer and Mayor of Athens.
- Kostis Kotzias (1921–1979), Greek writer and dramaturge.
- Nikos Kotzias (born 1950), Greek political theorist and Foreign Minister of Greece between 2015 and 2018.

== See also ==
- Kotzia Square
