= Angelos Evert =

Greek policeman (1894–1970)

- Άγγελος Έβερτ

Chief of Cities Police
- In office 25 May 1950 – 23 February 1951
- In office 22 November 1952 – 18 September 1954

Personal details
- Born: 10 April 1894 Athens, Kingdom of Greece
- Died: 30 December 1970 (aged 76) Athens, Greece
- Children: Miltiadis Evert

Military service
- Branch/service: Cities Police
- Years of service: 1929 - 1955
- Rank: Commissioner

Angelos Evert (Greek: Άγγελος Έβερτ; German: Ewert; 10 April 1894 – 30 December 1970) was a Greek police officer, most notable for serving as head of the Athens branch of the Cities Police during the Axis Occupation of Greece during World War II.

== Biography ==
He was born in Athens, the son of the Gendarmerie Major Miltiadis Evert. His family was of Bavarian origin, having come to Greece with its first king, the Bavarian prince Otto. After Law studies in the University of Athens, Angelos Evert joined the Gendarmerie as an officer in September 1915. He was transferred to the Cities Police in 1929, and became Police Commissioner of the Athens branch in September 1941, a few months after the country was overrun by the Germans.

During the course of the occupation, Evert and the German Sicherheitsdienst jointly provided protection to illegal casinos and gambling establishments operating throughout the country. Both received kickbacks for their services while most of the profits were used to pay the salaries of collaborationist spies. Following the end of the occupation Evert assisted the authorities in the capture and imprisonment of 48 underground casino owners.

Over the next few years he was active in several fronts, supporting the Resistance and maintaining contacts with the Greek government in exile at Cairo, all the while cooperating with the German occupation authorities in the hunting of communists. Germans, suspecting his involvement, dismissed him in July 1943, but he was reinstated following reactions from the police force. He also participated in the rescue of several Jewish families from Athens, for which he was later honoured as a "Righteous among the Nations". On 3 December 1944, his policemen opened fire on a large pro EAM demonstration in central Athens, triggering the Dekemvriana clashes.

He served as Chief of the Cities Police from 1951 until he was dismissed on 31 January 1955. He died of heart failure on 30 December 1970. His son, Miltiadis Evert, became a politician with the conservative New Democracy party, and served as Mayor of Athens in 1987–1989 and President of New Democracy in 1993–1997.

Throughout his career, he received numerous medals and commendations, including the Legion of Honour and the Grand Commander of the Order of the Phoenix with swords.

== Righteous Among the Nations ==
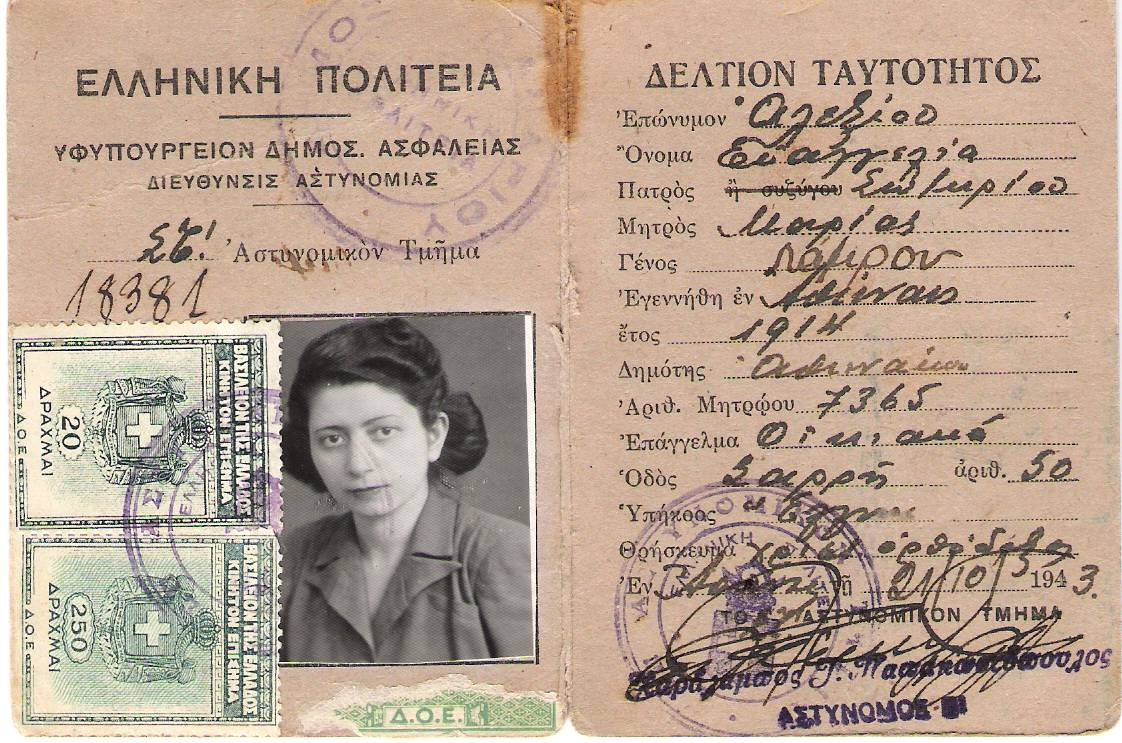
Identity card forged by Police Chief Evert which falsely identifies Eva Alhanati, a Greek Jewish woman, as a member of the Greek Orthodox Church named Evangelia Alexiou.

At the end of 1943, during the Holocaust in Greece, Police Chief Evert ordered the forging of thousands of identity cards to Athenian Jews under which described them as Greek Orthodox Gentiles. Contributed to saving many belonging to Jewish community in the city. His actions are well known in the State of Israel and in 1969 he was awarded the letter "Righteous Among the Nations" by the Institute of "Yad Vashem".

Angelos Evert later testified that he drew his inspiration from the actions, words, and deeds of Archbishop Damaskinos of Athens, who had urged the Greek people to save the remaining Jews of Greece.
