= Athens 98.4 FM =

Athina 98.4
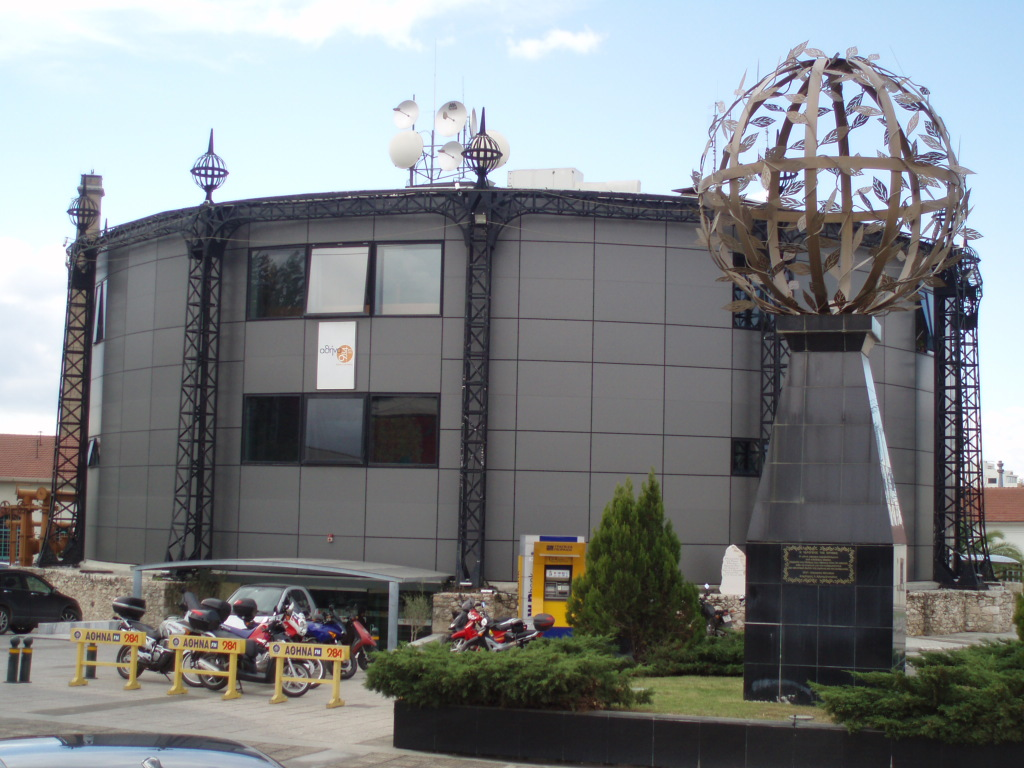
- Athens; Greece
- Broadcast area: Attica
- Frequency: 98.3 MHz
- Branding: Athens Municipal Radio

Programming
- Language: Greek
- Affiliations: FM100

Ownership
- Owner: Municipality of Athens

History
- First air date: May 31, 1987
- Former frequencies: 98.4 MHz (1987–2001)

Links
- Website: athina984.gr

Athens 98.4 FM (Greek: Αθήνα 9.84), officially Municipality of Athens Broadcasting Corporation "Athina", is the first non-state radio station to begin broadcasting in Greece in 1987. The station is the forerunner of the municipal radio sector in Greece.

== History ==
The station went on air on May 31, 1987, without a license but backed by then mayor of Athens Miltiadis Evert. The station initially faced many challenges, as a legal framework for private broadcasting was not finalized in Greece until 1989.

The station used to broadcast on 98.4 FM, but moved to 98.3 FM in March 2001 after frequencies in the city of Athens were reassigned. The station also webcasts online and broadcasts via satellite.

The station also operates its website of news in both Greek and English language.

In 2004, it established the foreign-language station Athens International Radio as a spin-off project.
