= Koniaris =

Koniaris is a surname. Notable people with the surname include:

- Antonis Koniaris (born 1997), Greek basketball player
- Ioannis Koniaris (1801–1872), Greek politician
