= Nikos Pateras =

Greek businessman

Nikolas D. Pateras
- Born: 26 August 1963 (age 63); Oinousses, Chios, Greece
- Education: London School of Foreign Trade, City of London Polytechnic
- Occupations: Greek Shipowner and Entrepreneur
- Years active: 1992–
- Organization: Contships Management Inc.
- Board member of: Chairman of the Board of Directors & CEO of Contships Management
- Children: 3

Nikolas D. Pateras
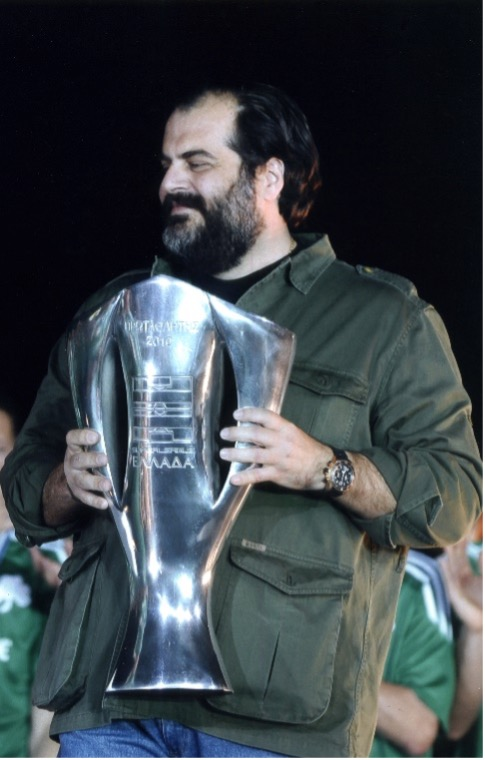

38th and 40th president of Panathinaikos
- In office 26 May 2008 and 8 September 2010 – 21 May 2010 and 20 December 2010
- Preceded by: Argiris Mitsou
- Succeeded by: Nikos Konstantopoulos and Ioannis Vekris

Personal details
- Born: 1963 (age 62–63) Oinousses, Chios, Greece
- Profession: Greek Shipowner and Entrepreneur

Nikolas D. Pateras is a seventh-generation Greek shipowner and founder of Contships Management Inc. He was born on 26 August 1963, in Athens, Greece, and is originally from the island of Oinousses. He has 3 children, Anastasia, Diamantis and John.

== Biographical Information ==
Nikolas D. Pateras is a graduate of the London School of Foreign Trade and the City of London Polytechnic where he completed his shipping studies in 1984. He served his military service in the Greek Navy from 1984 to 1986.

Prior to the creation of Contships Management Inc. he was active in the shipping industry as Chairman of Pacific & Atlantic Corporation (P&A) since 1993. The company's establishment had followed the Pateras Brothers Ltd. firm which was founded by his father Diamantis and his uncle John in 1957. The fleet under the management of Pacific & Atlantic Corporation reached 50 vessels in 2002.

Under the leadership of Nikolas D. Pateras, the fleet of Contships Management Inc. consists of 47 feeder containerships. Today, it is the largest independent operator of feeder containerships with a capacity of 900–1,500 TEUs.

Between 2008 and 2010, Nikolas D. Pateras was president and shareholder of the Greek football club Panathinaikos. Under his presence at the helm of the club, they won both the Super League Greece and Greek Cup in the 2009–2010 season.

Serving the motto "shipping and benevolence", Nikolas D. Pateras founded the "Nikolas D. Pateras" Public Benefit Foundation. Throughout its years of operation, the Foundation has focused on supporting initiatives and actions related to Health, Culture, Maritime Heritage, Education, and the support of society.

=== Family History ===
The family of Nikolas D. Pateras has been involved in shipping for over 7 generations.

According to a family tree recorded in 1770, Ioannis Pateras is considered to be the family's forefather, while the family's maritime and shipping activity is attested from the 19th century. Ioannis Pateras had 5 sons, Nikolaos, Georgios, Konstantis, Elias and Michael. His grandson Konstantis was baptized with the prefix "Hadjis", and since then the Hadjipateras family came into existence.

In general, until the middle of the 19th century, the Oinoussian captains and seafarers would participate in the transit trade between the islands of the Eastern Aegean Sea and the coasts of Asia Minor with their ships.

The Pateras family was considered among the most important families on the island that were involved in maritime trade. According to Andreas Laimos, the merchant fleet of Oinousses in 1868 consisted of 30 ships with a total capacity of 3,160 tons. The island's fleet of merchant ships would gradually be renewed with the activity of the Oinoussian shipping community expanding into the Mediterranean over the next few decades.

In 1905, the Pateras, Hadjipateras and Laimos families invested in the purchase of the "Marietta Ralli", the first steam-powered merchant ship of Oinousses; a vital first step in the transition from sail to steam. After the "Marietta Ralli", dozens of purchases of steam-powered vessels by Oinoussian shipowners would follow. In fact, it is estimated that from 1923 to 1939, the Oinoussian fleet exceeded 65 ships.

Steamships owned by members of the Pateras family were the following 23: Diamantis (D. Pateras & Sons), Nikolaos (Nik. I. Pateras & Sons), Katigo (K. Hadjipateras & Sons), Charalambos P. (H. Pateras & Sons), Nikolas Pateras (N. J. Pateras), Constantis (K. D. Pateras & Sons), Oinoussios, Chrysanthi and John Pateras (N. Pateras & Sons), Constantis and Aias (K. D. Pateras & Sons), Aghia Irene (Elias Pateras), Lili and Victoria (Charalambos N. Pateras), Calliope and Diamantis (Diamantis Pateras & Sons), Leonidas and Leandros (K. Hadjipateras & Sons), St. Victor and Mount Kyllini (N. I. Pateras & Sons), Dirphys (Vassilis & Nikolas Pateras), Maruko Pateras and Anastasios Pateras (Anastasios Pateras & Sons). The maritime fortunes of the Nikolas D. Pateras family after the end of WW2, are closely linked to Capt. Nikolaos John Pateras (1890 - 1953), who, in collaboration with his brothers Vasileios and Georgios, was already an owner of steamships during the interwar period. During World War II two of his ships were sunk by the Germans. As a result of this loss, in 1947 N. J. Pateras and his two brothers would acquire one of the 100 Liberty ships that had been sold by the U.S. government after the war to Greek traditional shipping families. This ship was the "Dirphys" and was an important milestone in the development and expansion of the N.J. Pateras family in the post-war years.

After the end of the Second World War, shipowners from Oinoussai would buy 14 of the first 100 Liberty bought from the US government under the guarantee of the Greek State. Of those, 8 were bought by members of the Pateras and Hadjipateras families. These were: Agios Nikolaos (Nik. Hadjipateras & Sons), Costas Hadjipateras (Ioan. Hadjipateras & Sons), Konstantis (K.D. Pateras & Sons), Nikolas Pateras (N. I. Pateras & Sons), Anastasios (Anastasios Pateras & Sons), Dirphys (N. I. Pateras & B. I. Pateras), Kalliopi (Diamantis Pateras & Sons) and Nikolaos (Charalambos Pateras). After the death of N. J. Pateras, his sons Ioannis (1930–2000) and Diamantis (1933–2009), having both served as Captains on the family's ships, decided to carve their own business path: In 1957 they founded Pateras Brothers Ltd in Piraeus, initially managing general cargo ships. Pateras Brothers Ltd. would manage 40 cargo ships during its existence (until the early 1990s).

== Pacific & Atlantic Corporation ==
In keeping with the tradition of the family members taking over the running of the family business, Nikolas D. Pateras became the Director of Pateras Brothers Limited in 1986.

In 1993 he started operating under the name Pacific & Atlantic Corporation (P&A), taking the firm towards new directions and challenges.

With his involvement in the family business having started in 1986, his main strategy was to exploit the cyclical nature of the shipping market in order to maximise profits when buying and selling ships (asset playing). Based on this business strategy, Pacific & Atlantic operated a total of 108 dry cargo vessels between 1994 and 2007.

Pacific & Atlantic's impressive growth meant that by 2000 it operated one of the largest fleets (numerically) in Greek-owned shipping: 50 bulk carriers and multi-purpose vessels.

Indicatively, until 2004 the company was the third largest ship management company in the Greek-owned shipping community with a fleet of 50 ships, employing 1,500 seafarers on board and 120 staff in its offices.

From 2005 to 2007 Nikolas D. Pateras would gradually sell the fleet of Pacific & Atlantic. Although this decision seemed quite risky at the time, in the end, it proved to be a success as the ships were sold at very high prices just before the 2008 financial crisis.

In 2011, Nikolas D. Pateras was appointed a member of the Hellenic Committee of the Italian classification society RINA.

== Contships Management Inc. ==
In 2015 Nikolas D. Pateras founded Contships Management Inc., a containership management company. Contships operates in Greece under Law Decree 89/1967 with its offices located at 45, Vassilissis Sofias Avenue in central Athens.

During the development of the Contships fleet, Nikolas D. Pateras focused on the second-hand market with a particular preference for the German market of second-hand feeder containerships.

In recognition of the company's remarkable expansion, Contships received the Dry Cargo Company of the Year award at the annual Lloyd's List Greek Shipping Awards in 2018. According to the Lloyd's list website, Contships is "a dynamic niche project unique in Greek shipping" and in 2018 "its fleet reached 31 feeder containerships, placing it in the top ten companies in this category worldwide". Judges noted, that "Contships is working with all major charterers and has already made a name for itself in a sector where reliability and service are "musts" for success".

By 2019, and in just four years since its inception, Contships had invested more than $250 million to expand its fleet, which at that time reached 40 vessels ranging from 704 to 1,432 TEU.

Within 2020 Contships was one of the six largest Greek-owned containership operating companies with a fleet of more than 40 vessels.

In 2023, Contships' fleet consists of 47 feeder containerships. Based on these numbers, Contships constitutes the world's largest independent operator of feeder containerships with a capacity of 900–1,500 TEUs, holding a leading role in the feeder containership market.

In January 2025, Contships Management, the world's largest independent owner of feeder container ships, became the first privately held Greek shipping firm to tap the Nordic bond market, issuing $100 million in five-year sustainability-linked securities at a 9% interest rate, with proceeds earmarked for debt refinancing and fleet expansion.

== Panathinaikos F.C. ==
Nikolas D. Pateras, one of the most prominent fans of Panathinaikos, served as the president of the club for two years (2008–2010). His father Diamantis was the general manager of the football department of the "Trifylli" and was part of the legendary Panathinaikos team that reached the 1971 European Cup final in Wembley against Ajax.

Nikolas D. Pateras’ active involvement with the team would begin in 2008 when it was decided that Giannis Vardinogiannis would open up ownership of the team. More specifically, Nikolas D. Pateras took over the presidency of the club on 26 May 2008, following a meeting with Giannis Vardinogiannis, Andreas Vgenopoulos and Pavlos Giannakopoulos. This move would usher in the era of "multi-stakeholderism" in the management of Panathinaikos with the entry of prominent Panathinaikos fans into the club's shareholding composition.

This new collective effort was accompanied by a capital increase - amounting to €67 million - which gave a new impetus to the club's football department. Under his leadership, and thanks to the significant investments in the team, Panathinaikos managed to achieve successful results both within and outside Greek borders. At the same time, important international players such as Djibril Cisse, Gilberto Silva, Sebastian Leto, Kostas Katsouranis and Giorgos Karagounis wore the Panathinaikos jersey during that period.

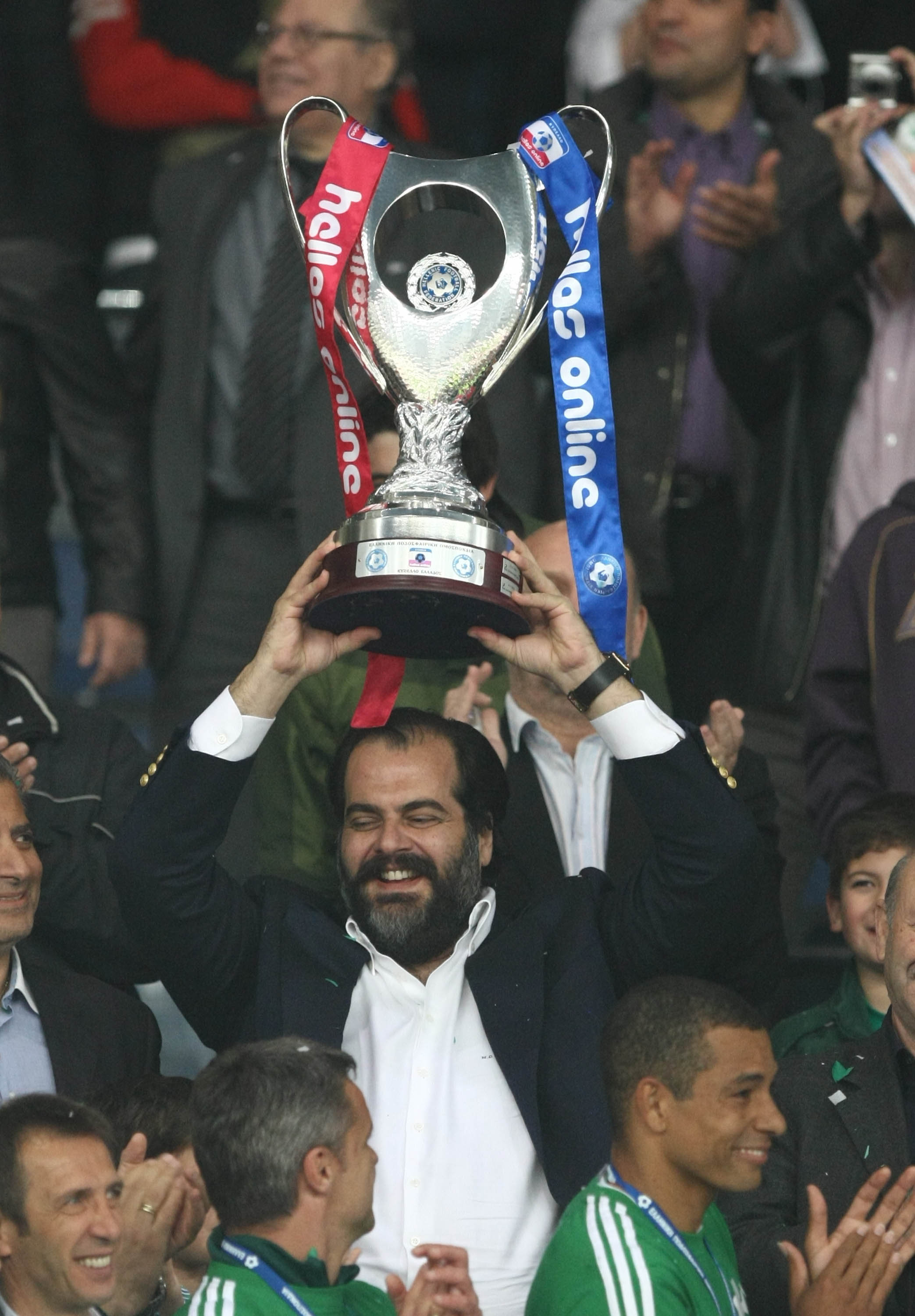
The president of PAO, Nikolas D. Pateras, with the Greek Football Cup (2010).

Without a doubt, the most celebrated moment of his two-year presidency was winning the Superleague championship and Greek Cup in the 2009–2010 season.

As for the club's European run, under the Pateras’ presidency, the first year (2008–09) found Panathinaikos in the top 16 teams of the Champions League, having finished first in their group, above Inter and Werder Bremen.

Nikolas D. Pateras would remain president of Panathinaikos up until May 2010 when he resigned.

In 2013, he donated his shares in Panathinaikos to "Panathinaiki Symmachia", a coalition led by Giannis Alafouzos that was then, the main shareholder of the club and later became president.

== Philanthropy ==
Nikolas D. Pateras has made donations and supported initiatives related to health, culture, maritime heritage, education and the wider society in Greece. He has done so throughout his business career through personal initiatives and also through the "Nikolas D. Pateras" Public Benefit Foundation.

For his multifaceted and multifaceted contribution to Greek society, both through personal initiatives and through the activities of the "Nicolas D. Pateras" Public Benefit Foundation, Nikolas D. Pateras has been honored with the 2023 Efkranti Award for Social Contribution.

The members of the jury of the Efkranti Award decided to honor Nikolas Pateras with this award, as they recognized his long-standing contribution to the Greek Security Forces, as well as his substantial assistance in the field of Health in Greece. At the same time, the members of the Efkranti Awards jury clearly mentioned Mr. Pateras’ efforts to strengthen remote and island communities, as well as the preservation, protection and maintenance of Christian Orthodox monuments and holy temples.

=== Contributions towards State and Society ===
In January 2010, with a 300,000-euro donation from the "Nikolas D. Pateras Foundation", the Rizari Park was renovated. On approximately 15 acres, 10,000 m^{2} of greenery was planted including 98 trees, 406 shrubs, 9,000 m^{2} of lawn. 130 lamps were also installed throughout the park.

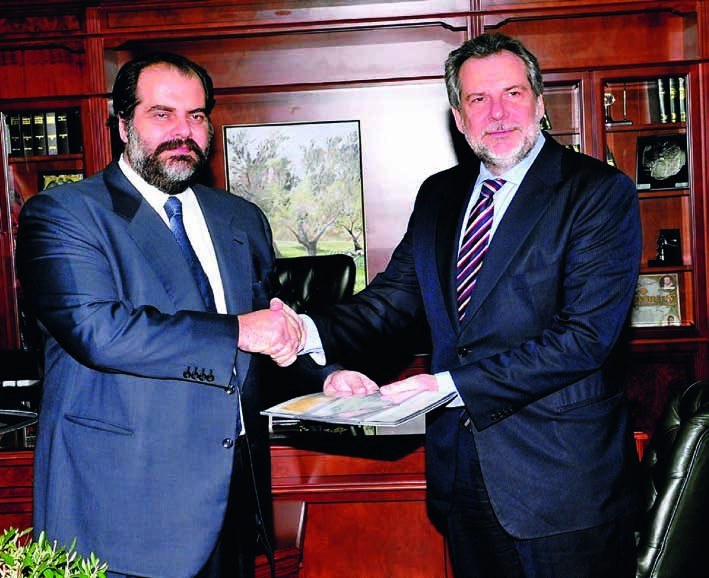
Nikolas D. Pateras hands over a check of 200,000 euros for the repair of DI.AS and D.EL.TA motorcycle teams of the Hellenic Police to the Minister of Citizen Protection Christos Papoutsis (2011)

The support of the "Nikolas D. Pateras Foundation" to the country's security forces, and especially to the Hellenic Police, can be characterized as long-lasting and systematic. A typical example of the foundation's support is the donation of 200,000 euros to the Hellenic Police for the repair of motorcycles of the DIAS Team in 2011.

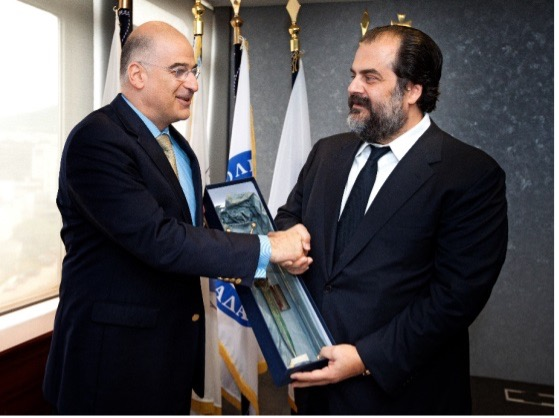
In 2013, Nikolas D. Pateras was awarded by the Minister of Public Order and Citizen Protection Nikos Dendias for the valuable and timeless contribution of "Nikolas D. Pateras Foundation" to the Hellenic Police

In 2013, Nikolas D. Pateras was recognized with an award by the Minister of Public Order and Citizen Protection Nikos Dendias for his valuable and lasting contribution to the Hellenic Police.

Contships was a key supporter of the retrospective exhibition of the Greek painter "Yannis Moralis" that ran from 20 September 2018 to 5 January 2019 at the Benaki Museum. The company was also a sponsor of the exhibition "Picasso and Antiquity" organized as part of the exhibition series "Divine Dialogues" at the Museum of Cycladic Art in 2019.

In 2019, thanks to a donation from the family of Nikolas D. Pateras, the restoration and maintenance of the murals of the Church of St. George in Rizari Park Athens, began. At the same time, a total renovation of the church's exterior was carried out, with painting, insulation, marble maintenance, and lighting works being carried out along with the installation of a security system. The project was completed in November 2020.

In 2019, due to a large inflow of water from the roof, the Church of St. Nicholas, which was built in 1876, inside the enclosure of the British Embassy in Athens, suffered severe damages. The family of Nikolas D. Pateras undertook the repair works and preservation of the murals and restoration of the church. Repairs were completed on 6 December 2020.

In addition to his general charitable activities, Nikolas D. Pateras is particularly active in matters concerning his home island of Oinousses.

In 2019 and 2020, he announced a one-off grant of 2,000 euros for each newborn child born to permanent residents of Oinousses. A total of 12 families have so far been supported by this initiative, which aims to support young families in the remote island of Oinousses. In addition, in 2022, Nikolas D. Pateras announced the contribution of modern presentation material and interactive whiteboards to the Primary School of Oinousses.

In 2025, Nikolaos Pateras fully funded the complete restoration and renovation of the Church of Saint Nicholas on Oinousses, with a budget of €650,000, in memory of his parents Diamantis and Anastasia Pateras, as well as his grandparents Nikolaos and Maritsa Pateras. The church had last been renovated in 1925.

In 2020, Contships Management Inc. donated a new call centre to the Merchant Marine Academy of Aspropyrgos.

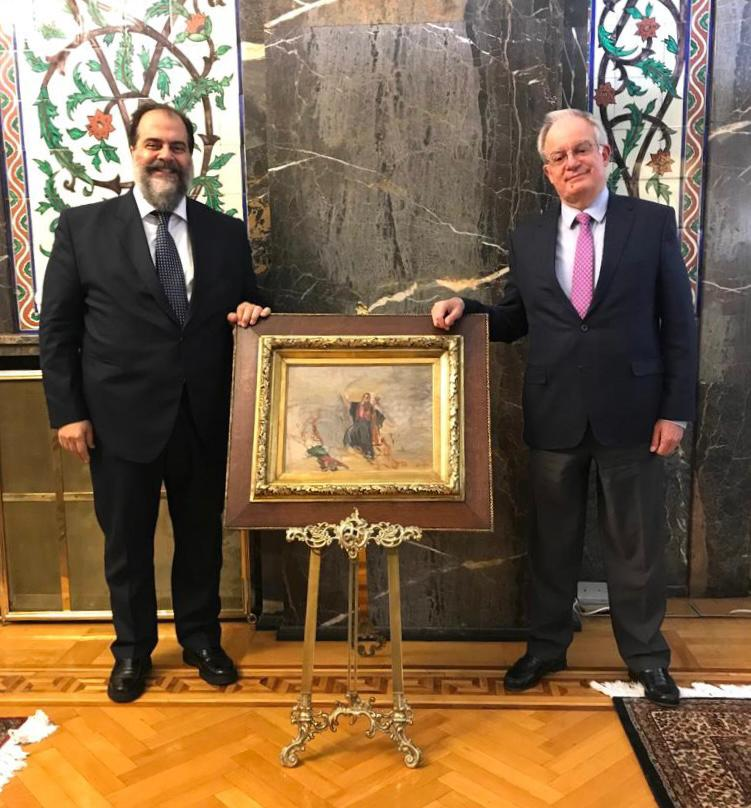
In 2022, Nikolas D. Pateras donated the artwork "Papaflessas" by the painter Simeon Savvidis to the Hellenic Parliament. The project was received by the president of the Parliament, Konstantinos Tasoulas

In February 2022, Nikolas D. Pateras donated the famous painting "Papaflessas", by painter Simeon Savvidis to the Greek Parliament. The work, which is of great historical significance, was added to the Art Collection of the Hellenic Parliament, and was received officially by the president of the Greek Parliament, Konstantinos Tassoulas.

=== Health ===
In 2004, Nikolas D. Pateras donated €500,000 towards the renovation of the exterior of the 11-storey AHEPA building of the Evangelismos Hospital.

During the COVID-19 pandemic, Contships donated 25,000 protective facemasks to cover the needs of the Ministry of Shipping and Insular Policy and the Hellenic Coast Guard. At the same time, another 10,000 masks were donated to the Port Authority of Chios and the Municipality of Oinousses.

In 2021, on the occasion of the 140th anniversary of the Evangelismos Hospital, Nikolas D. Pateras sponsored the publication of a commemorative historical album entitled "Evangelismos Hospital, 1881-2021". The publication was dedicated to "the unsung heroes of the Medical, Nursing, Administrative and Technical Service of the hospital".

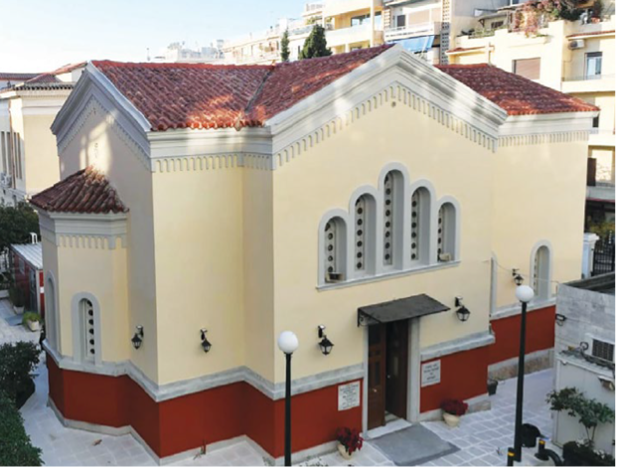
Photo of the Church of the Annunciation of the Virgin Mary located in the Evangelismos Hospital, after the renovation undertaken by Nikolas D. Pateras (2022)

At the end of 2022, a Nikolas D. Pateras donation saw to the complete renovation of the Church of the Annunciation of the Virgin Mary located in the Evangelismos Hospital, in memory of his sister Maria Pateras. This historic church was built in 1912 and since then it has been at the disposal of the patients, their relatives and the hospital staff.
