= Dimitrios Soutsos =

Mayor of Athens from 1879 to 1887

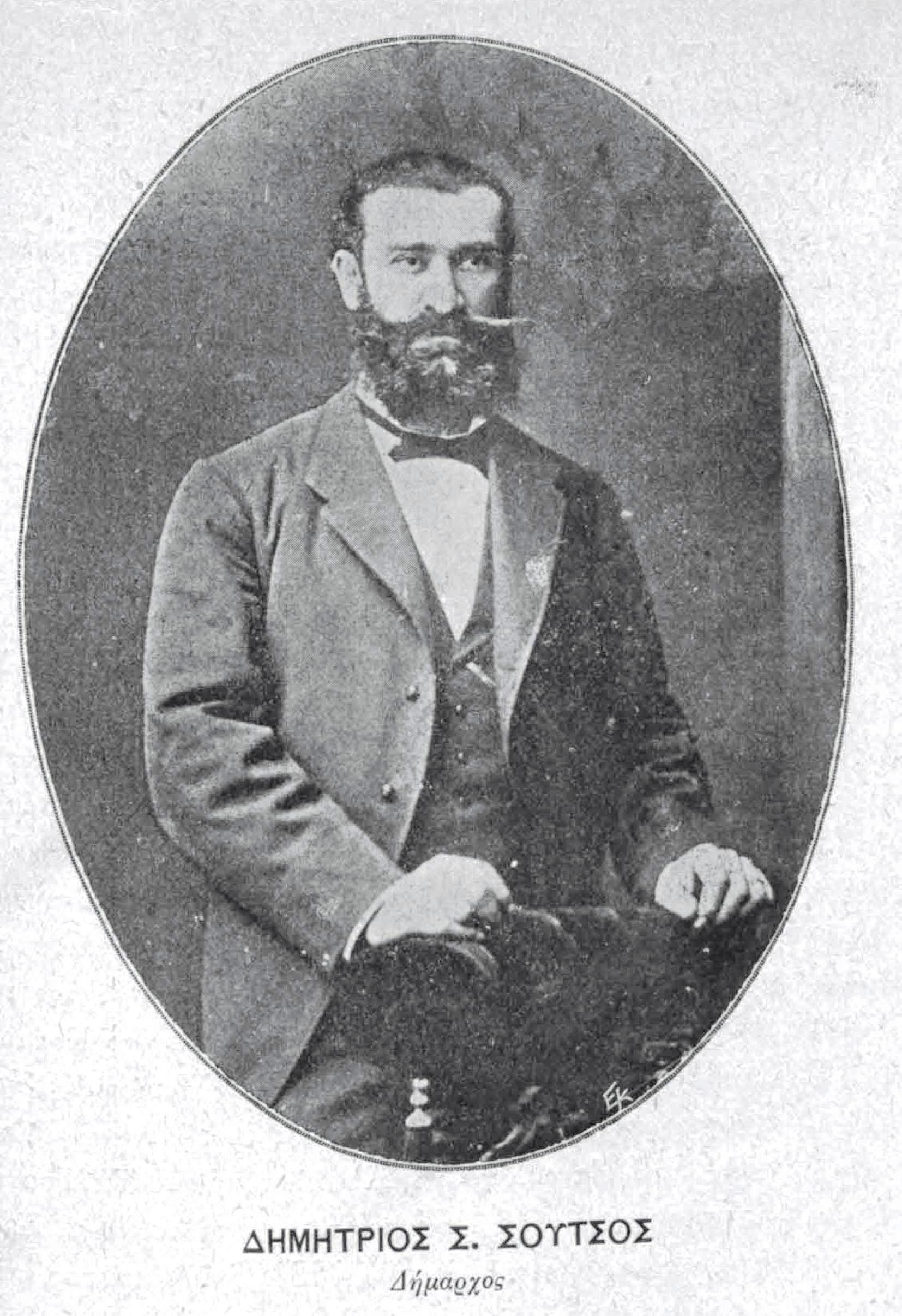
Dimitrios Soutzos, mayor of Athens (1879-1887)

Dimitrios Soutzos (Greek: Δημήτριος Σούτζος) was the mayor of Athens between 1879 and 1887.

== Biography ==
He was the son of Skarlatos Soutzos, a descendant of the distinguished Phanariot Soutzos family who became a Major General in the Greek Army, and of Elpis Kantakouzinou, daughter of the magnate and freedom fighter Alexandros Kantakouzinos.

He was elected for the first time as mayor of Athens on 11 May 1879. Re-elected for the second term, he remained in office until 30 September 1887.

Preceded by Panagis Kyriakos	Mayor of Athens; May 11, 1879 – September 30, 1887	Succeeded by Thrasyvoulos Papalexandris
