= Dimitris Beis =

Greek politician

Mayor of Athens
- In office 1 January 1979 – 31 December 1986
- Preceded by: Ioannis Papatheodorou
- Succeeded by: Miltiadis Evert

Personal details
- Born: 1928 Edessa, Greece
- Died: 25 October 2012 (aged 84) Athens, Greece

Dimitris Beis (Greek: Δημήτρης Μπέης; 1928 – 25 October 2012) was a Greek politician. He was Mayor of Athens from 1979 to 1986. He also served as a Member of Parliament.

Political offices
Preceded by Ioannis Papatheodorou	Mayor of Athens; 1979–1986	Succeeded by Miltiadis Evert
