= Aristidis Skliros =

Mayor of Athens
- In office 12 October 1944 – 18 May 1946
- Succeeded by: Ioannis Pitsikas

Personal details
- Party: Liberal Party

Aristidis Skliros (1890–1976) was a Greek politician and lawyer who served as the first mayor of Athens after Greece was liberated from the Nazi occupation.

== Biography ==
He fought in the Balkan Wars and from 1915 practiced law. His acquaintance with George Papandreou, was decisive. On 12 October 1944, while the Germans were withdrawing from Athens, he was offered the position of mayor of the Greek capital by the three-member government committee, following a decision by the National Government of which Papandreou was prime minister. Skliros, despite his hesitation due to the difficulties of the period, accepted the responsibility. He appeared on the balcony of the city hall that same day, cheered by the crowd. For seven months, until May 1945, he governed the city without a city council. In November 1945, he was the first mayor to request that the city's expenditures be voluntarily audited by the Court of Auditors. His term ended on 18 May 1946.
