= Antonis Tritsis =

Greek politician and urban planner

Mayor of Athens
- In office 1 January 1991 – 7 April 1992
- Preceded by: Nikolaos Giatrakos
- Succeeded by: Leonidas Kouris

Personal details
- Born: 1937 Argostoli, Cefalonia, Greece
- Died: 7 April 1992 (aged 54–55) Athens, Greece

Antonis Tritsis (Greek: Αντώνης Τρίτσης; 1937 – 7 April 1992) was a Greek politician and urban planner, born and raised in the town of Argostoli on the island of Cephalonia.

During his youth, he was an athlete of Panathinaikos A.O. A founding member of the Panhellenic Socialist Movement (PASOK), he was elected MP in the Greek Parliament with PASOK in 1981 and 1985 and served as Minister of Urban Planning, and Minister for National Education and Religious Affairs. However, he was expelled by Andreas Papandreou for voting against the party regarding the PASOK's corruption in the Koskotas scandal. In 1989, he established the short-lived Greek Radical Movement. In 1990, in a political shift, he was elected mayor of Athens with support from the New Democracy party. Assuming office, he appeared voluble as to his pet projects of bold planting of trees throughout Athens to restrain excessive construction and air pollution in the city, along with those of the unification of the archaeological sites in Athens' historical centre and the re-introduction of the tram railway. He died after a stroke in April 1992.

Political offices
Preceded by Nikolaos Giatrakos	Mayor of Athens; 1991–1992	Succeeded by Leonidas Kouris
Preceded by Apostolos Kaklamanis	Minister of National Education and Religious Affairs; 1988–1989	Succeeded by Apostolos Kaklamanis
