= Miltiadis Evert =

Greek politician

- Μιλτιάδης Έβερτ

Leader of the Opposition
- In office 3 November 1993 – 21 March 1997
- Prime Minister: Andreas Papandreou; Costas Simitis
- Preceded by: Konstantinos Mitsotakis
- Succeeded by: Kostas Karamanlis

President of New Democracy
- In office 3 November 1993 – 21 March 1997
- Preceded by: Konstantinos Mitsotakis
- Succeeded by: Kostas Karamanlis

Mayor of Athens
- In office 1 January 1987 – 14 May 1989
- Preceded by: Dimitris Beis
- Succeeded by: Nikolaos Giatrakos

Personal details
- Born: 12 May 1939 Athens, Greece
- Died: 9 February 2011 (aged 71) Athens, Greece
- Party: New Democracy
- Spouse: Lisa Vanderpool
- Children: 2
- Parent: Angelos Evert
- Relatives: Eugene Vanderpool (father-in-law)
- Education: Athens University of Economics and Business
- Occupation: Politician

Miltiadis Evert (Greek: Μιλτιάδης Έβερτ; German: Ebert; 12 May 1939 – 9 February 2011) was a Greek politician, a member of Parliament, government minister, and ex-chairman of the New Democracy party.

== Background ==
Evert was born in Athens, Greece. He was the son of Angelos Evert, chief of police in Athens during the Nazi occupation of Greece in World War II and credited with saving many Jews and resistance fighters from Gestapo persecution. The Ebert family is of Bavarian origin, one of the families that settled in Athens during the reign of King Otto in the early 19th century.

== Education ==
Evert studied at the Athens University of Economics and Business.

== Political career ==
Evert served as the Mayor of Athens from 1 January 1987 to 14 May 1989, and he was chairman of New Democracy from 1993 to 1997. He also served many times as minister.

As mayor of Athens in 1987, Evert was the first to exercise the legal possibility of opposition radio broadcasting in Greece since all radio stations (including television networks) were a state monopoly. He helped launch Athena 98.4 FM, the first private radio station to begin broadcasting legally in Greece.

== Personal life ==
He was married to photographer Lisa Vanderpool, daughter of American archaeologist Eugene Vanderpool, and they had two daughters.

On 9 February 2011 Evert died in Athens at the age of 71.

Political offices
Preceded by Dimitrios Beis	Mayor of Athens; 1987–1989	Succeeded by Nikolaos Giatrakos
Party political offices
Preceded by Constantine Mitsotakis	President of New Democracy; 1993–1997	Succeeded by Kostas Karamanlis
