= Athens International Radio =

Athens; Greece
- Broadcast area: Attica
- Frequency: 104.4 MHz
- Branding: AIR FM 104.4

Programming
- Languages: Greek, English, French, German, Spanish, Italian, Russian, Arabic, Albanian, Polish, Bulgarian, Romanian, Tagalog, Portuguese, Chinese, Japanese and Urdu
- Format: News & Entertainment

Ownership
- Owner: Municipality of Athens
- Sister stations: Athens 98.4 FM

History
- First air date: 2004

Links
- Website: athina984.gr

Athens International Radio (AIR 104.4 FM) was an Athens radio station aiming at a non-Greek speaking listenership. It broadcast on 104.4 FM in 16 languages (not simultaneously), including English, French, German, Spanish, Italian, Russian, Arabic, Albanian, Polish, Bulgarian, Romanian, Tagalog, Portuguese, Chinese, Japanese and Urdu.

The station produced more than 15 hours of locally produced programmes daily, consisting of news, music, traffic, weather, chat, comment and entertainment tips.

The station broadcast content from the BBC World Service, Radio France Internationale and Deutsche Welle.

On September 16, 2010, an Athens public prosecutor confiscated AIR's transmitters on Mount Hymettus on the grounds that the radio was operating without a valid license. This led to AIR ceasing its broadcasts on the FM band, leaving it only with its 7/24 web livestream which ceased in 2015.

The Greek National Broadcasting Council reviewed the station's status on September 21, 2010, and issued a non-binding recommendation to the Telecommunications watchdog about AIR's future.

Athens International Radio was a project of Athens 98.4 FM, a broadcasting company wholly owned by the Municipality of Athens.
