= Pafsanias Katsotas =

Greek army officer and politician (1896–1991

- Παυσανίας Κατσώτας
- Born: 1896; Stamna, Aetolia-Acarnania, Kingdom of Greece
- Died: 14 February 1991 (aged 94–95); Athens, Third Hellenic Republic
- Education: Hellenic Military Academy
- Military career
- Allegiance: Kingdom of Greece; (Greece) Second Hellenic Republic
- Branch: Hellenic Army
- Service years: 1916–1929; 1940–1946; 1949–1950
- Rank: Major General
- Commands: 1st Greek Infantry Brigade; Head of Central Greece Military Command
- Wars: Greco-Turkish War of 1919-1922; World War II: Battle of Greece; Greco-Italian War; North African Campaign; Second Battle of El Alamein; Greek Civil War
- Awards: Order of George I Order of the Phoenix; Cross of Valour; War Cross
- Other work: Member of Parliament; Minister of Public Order; Minister of the Interior; Minister-Governor of Northern Greece; Mayor of Athens

Pafsanias Katsotas (Greek: Παυσανίας Κατσώτας, 1896 – 14 February 1991) was a Hellenic Army general and politician.

== Biography ==
Katsotas was born in the village of Stamna in Aetolia-Acarnania in 1896. He graduated from the Hellenic Army Academy in 1916 as an Infantry 2nd Lieutenant, and served in the Army until his voluntary retirement in 1929. Following the outbreak of the Greco-Italian War in 1940, he was recalled to service, and fought in the Albanian front as a regimental commanding officer with the rank of lieutenant colonel. Following the German invasion of Greece in April 1941, he fled the country and joined the forces of the Greek government in exile in the Middle East. He assumed command of the 1st Greek Infantry Brigade, with which he fought in the Second Battle of El Alamein.

After the liberation of Greece in 1944, he became Minister of Public Order in the short-lived cabinet of Panagiotis Kanellopoulos (November 1945), and head of the Athens Military Command. He retired again in 1946, and ran successfully for a seat in the Hellenic Parliament in the March 1946 elections, representing his native Aetolia-Acarnania. In 1949, during the last stages of the Greek Civil War, he was again recalled to service and appointed as head of the Central Greece Military Command. He retired in 1950 with the rank of Major General.

He was again elected to Parliament in the March 1950 elections. He became Minister of the Interior in the cabinet of Sofoklis Venizelos (March–April 1950), and Minister-Governor of Northern Greece in the Nikolaos Plastiras cabinet (May–August 1950). In 1954, he was elected Mayor of Athens, a post he occupied with minor interruptions until 1959. In 1960, Katsotas founded his own political party, the "Labour-Technical Party" (Εργατοτεχνικό Κόμμα), which in 1961 joined Georgios Papandreou's Centre Union. In February–June 1964, Katsotas served as Minister of Social Welfare in Papandreou's cabinet.

He last took part in the 1977 elections as part of the National Alignment ticket. Katsotas died in 1991.

== Awards ==
Katsotas was decorated with the Grand Commander of the Order of George I and of the Order of the Phoenix with Swords. He also received the Gold Cross of Valour twice and the War Cross four times.
