= Softex =

Softex-Athenian paper mills S.A.
- Type: Private
- Founded: 1936
- Headquarters: Athens, Greece
- Key people: Konstantinos Kefalas
- Products: Paper towels
- Revenue: ▲49.290.000 euros (2013)
- Owner: Intertrade Hellas
- Number of employees: ▼1.275 (2013)
- Website: softex.gr

Softex S.A. is a Greek paper towel company, headquartered in Athens, west of downtown. The company is located at the Acteon Building in Irinis Street, Neo Faliro, Athens. The first owner of the company was Apostolos Nikolaidis.

It manufactures paper towels and napkins and had two factories, in Athens and Drama. Softex suffered a fire in August 1994 that destroyed its machines, building and shipping centre. The company operated from other premises until the factory was rebuilt with fireproof technology.
