= Leonidas Kouris =

Greek politician

Leonidas Kouris (Greek: Λεωνίδας Κουρής) (born in Athens, 1949) is a Greek politician; former mayor of Athens and prefect of eastern Attica.

He ran unsuccessfully for a parliamentary seat in the 2000 election. He returned to local politics and in October 2002 was elected Prefect of Eastern Attica (50.1%)—himself resident of [Pikermi] for 30 years—and for a second term in the 2006 election (54.6%), in which however he exacerbated building disorder in the district by expeditiously legalising thousands of illegally constructed acres of land.

Political offices
Preceded by Antonis Tritsis	Mayor of Athens; 1992–1994	Succeeded by Dimitris Avramopoulos
