= Ioannis Koniaris =

Greek politician (1801–1872)

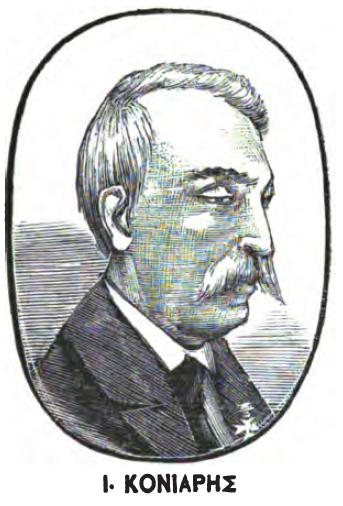
Portrait sketch of Ioannis Koniaris from the periodical Poikili Stoa in 1881

Ioannis Koniaris (Greek: Ιωάννης Κόνιαρης, 1801–1872) was a Greek politician of the 19th century, who was twice elected as Mayor of Athens, serving from 29 August 1854 until 22 November 1853 and again until 23 November 1854.

== Sources ==
- Ioannis Arsenis, Mihail Rafailovic, ed. (1881). Poikili Stoa: Ethniki eikonografimeni epetiris, Etos 1/16 1881-1914 (in Greek). Athens: Εστία.
- Ioannis Koniaris a synoptic biographical information from the Modern Greek Information Institute (in Greek)
- City of Athens - Historic Mayors (in Greek)

Preceded by Nikolaos Zacharitsas	Mayor of Athens; 29 August 1851 – 23 November 1854	Succeeded by Konstantinos Galatis
