= Pantelis Karasevdas =

Greek sport shooter (1877–1946)

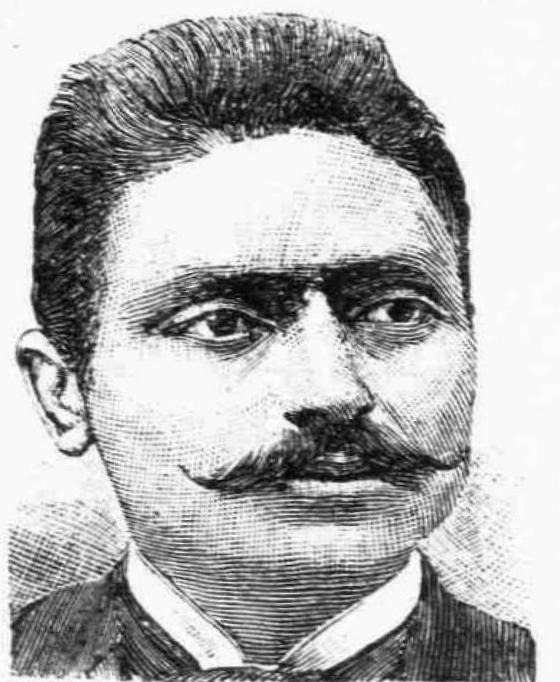

12th and 14th President of Panathinaikos F.C. and Panathinaikos AC
- In office 1924 and 1928 – 1926 and 1930
- Preceded by: Panos Savvidis and Dimitrios Damaskinos
- Succeeded by: Nikolaos Xiros

Personal details
- Born: 1877 Astakos, Greece
- Died: 14 March 1946 (aged 68–69) Agrinio, Greece
- Party: Liberal Party (Greece)
- Profession: Military Officer
- Sports career
Medal record
Men's shooting
Representing Greece
Olympic Games
Gold medal – first place	1896 Athens	Military rifle

Pantelis Karasevdas (Greek: Παντελής Καρασεβδάς; 1877 – 14 March 1946) was a Greek sport shooter. He was a member of Panachaikos Gymnastikos Syllogos, that merged in 1923 with Gymnastiki Etaireia Patron to become Panachaiki Gymnastiki Enosi. Karasevdas competed at the 1896 Summer Olympics in Athens, where he won a gold medal for the host country.

== Biography ==
Karasevdas was born in the town of Astakos in 1877 and he studied law at the University of Athens, but would later become a military officer with participation almost in every military event of Greece from the Greco-Turkish War of 1897 to the Greek Resistance during World War II, including the First Balkan War where he was seriously injured in Samos.

A prominent Venizelist and anti-Royalist, he was elected an MP since 1910 and was voted in two more times.

He was elected president of Panathinaikos A.C. two times (1924–27 and 1928–31) and president of Panellinios G.S. (1925 - 1935). He was also part of the Greek Olympic Committee from 1924 to 1935.

Karasevdas died on 14 March 1946 in Astakos the same town he was born in.

== Career ==
Karasevdas was just 19 years old when he competed at the 1896 Summer Olympics, he entered three shooting events, in the 200 metre military rifle, he won by a huge margin, scoring 2,350 points and hitting the target with all 40 shots, he also competed in the 300 metre free rifle event, placing fifth with a score of 1,039 out of 20 official starters, and in his other event the military pistol event, Karasevdas abandoned the competition after firing two of the five strings of six shots.
