= Greek Radical Movement =

Greek Radical Movement Ελληνικό Ριζοσπαστικό Κίνημα
- Founder: Antonis Tritsis
- Founded: 1989
- Dissolved: 1992
- Split from: Panhellenic Socialist Movement
- Ideology: Social democracy Radicalism
- Political position: Centre-left

Greek Radical Movement (Greek: Ελληνικό Ριζοσπαστικό Κίνημα) was a Greek political party founded by Antonis Tritsis on May 19, 1989. It continued to exist until April 1992.

Antonis Tritsis was a founding member of Panhellenic Socialist Movement (PASOK). However, he was expelled by Andreas Papandreou for voting against the party regarding the PASOK's corruption in the Koskotas scandal.

In the 1989 June elections, the Greek Radical Movement party received 4,162 votes and gained 0.1%. In the European election of 1989, it garnered 0.62% of the vote.

The following year, in the local elections of 1990, Antonis Tritsis decided to run for the Municipality of Athens. He sent a letter to the leaders of all political parties and asked for their support. On October 14, 1990, Tritsis elected Mayor of Athens as the leader of a coalition between New Democracy and the Greek Radical Movement.
