= Loukas Panourgias =

Greek athlete (1899–1981)

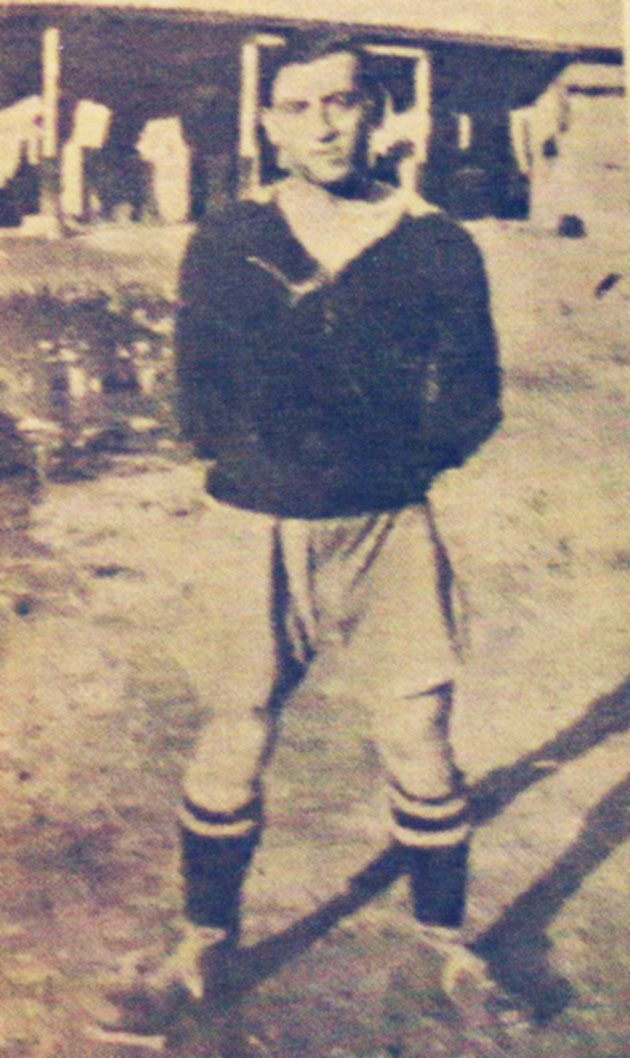
- As player of Panathinaikos

23rd President of Panathinaikos F.C. and Panathinaikos AC
- In office 1962–1967
- Preceded by: Ioannis Moatsos
- Succeeded by: Matthaios Koumarianos

Personal details
- Born: 4 September 1899 Livadeia, Greece
- Died: 17 January 1981 (aged 81) Athens, Greece
- Profession: Lawyer

Loukas Panourgias (Greek: Λουκάς Πανουργιάς; 1899 – 17 January 1981) was a Greek athlete and footballer.

At the age of 12 he went to Athens and a year later he formed an unofficial team called Niki. Soon he found himself in Panathinaikos, that was still then called Panellinios Podosfairikos Omilos (PPO). Also a track and field champion, Panourgias chose football.

He was part of the Olympic team for the 1920 Summer Olympics, but he broke his leg and consequently did not participate in the Olympic Games. However, he overcame his injury and helped Panathinaikos in the following five years.

Panourgias fought for the acquisition of the Stadium of Panathinaikos at Alexandras Avenue. Together with athletes and friends of the team he transformed the area of Perivola to a football field, which was offered to the team by the Municipality of Athens in 1922.

After he retired from football, he made a successful career as a lawyer. He became also president of Panathinaikos A.C. from 1962 to 1966 (one of the most successful in the club's history with titles in many sports), and of the Hellenic Football Federation (1974–75). He died on 17 January 1981, aged 81.
