= Apostolos Nikolaidis (athlete) =

Greek athlete, football manager and businessman

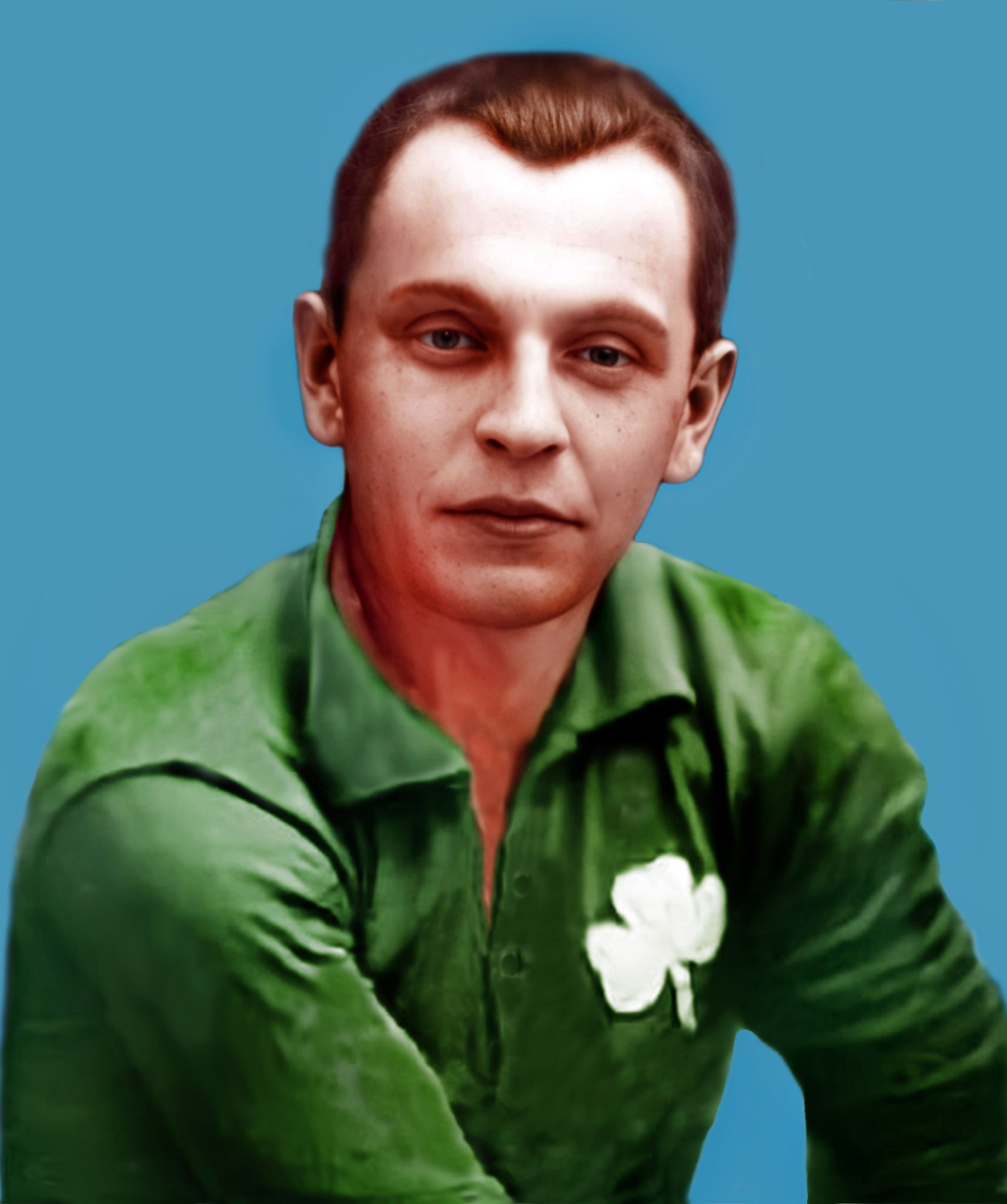
- Nikolaidis with Panathinaikos in 1922

Personal information
- Full name: Apostolos Nikolaidis
- Date of birth: 19 April 1896
- Place of birth: Plovdiv, Bulgaria
- Date of death: 15 October 1980 (aged 84)
- Place of death: Athens, Greece
- Positions: Defender; midfielder

Senior career*
Years	Team	Apps	(Gls)
1914–1928	Panathinaikos		

International career^{‡}
1920	Greece	1	(0)

Managerial career
- 1923–1927: Panathinaikos
- 1929: Greece
- 1934–1935: Greece
- * Club domestic league appearances and goals as of 14 June 2024 ‡ National team caps and goals as of 14 June 2024

Apostolos Nikolaidis (Greek: Απόστολος Νικολαΐδης; 19 April 1896 – 15 October 1980) was a Greek athlete, football manager and businessman. He was a leading board member and president of Panathinaikos A.O.

== Life and career ==
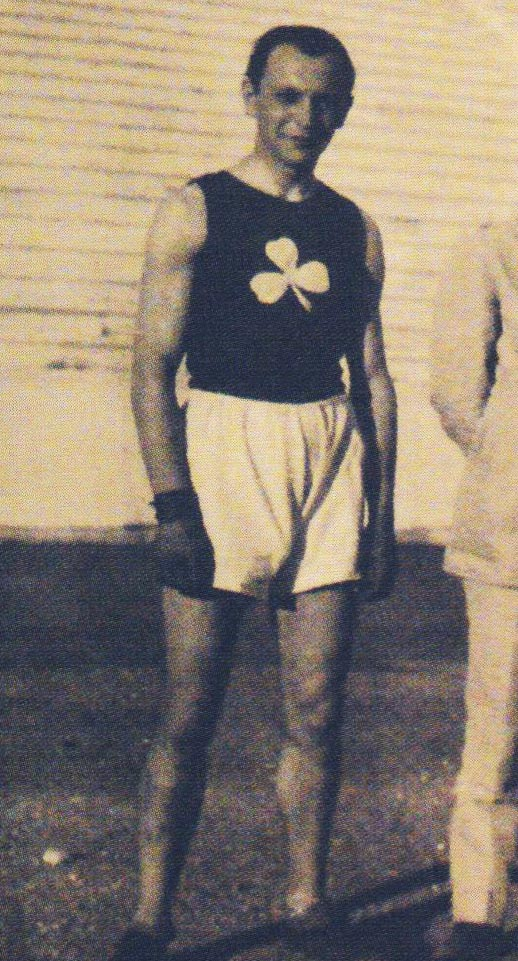
Nikolaidis as basketball player with Panathinaikos in 1919

Nikolaidis was born in Plovdiv, Bulgaria, a member of the Greek community. After his graduation from the Robert College in Istanbul, he moved first to Thessaloniki (where he competed as an athlete of Aris) and later to Athens in 1917 and joined the family of Panathinaikos. He was an athletic phenomenon, as he successfully competed in decathlon, football, basketball and volleyball and also a successful racing driver. He was a member of the Greek team at the 1920 Summer Olympics, both as a football player and as a track athlete. He played football for more than ten years and contributed to all sports departments of PAO. He also became manager of the Greece national football team.

In 1926–27 he was elected president of the Hellenic Football Federation and for a period of more than twenty years president of the Hellenic Amateur Athletic Association (1945–67). Moreover, he was president of the Automobile and Touring Club of Greece. For many decades, he was a board member of Panathinaikos A.C. and in 1974 he became president of the club. His contribution was significant to the transformation of Panathinaikos to a successful multi-sports club, apart from football.

From 1974 to 1976 he was also president of the Hellenic Olympic Committee. He was also a businessman and owner of Softex.

== Death ==
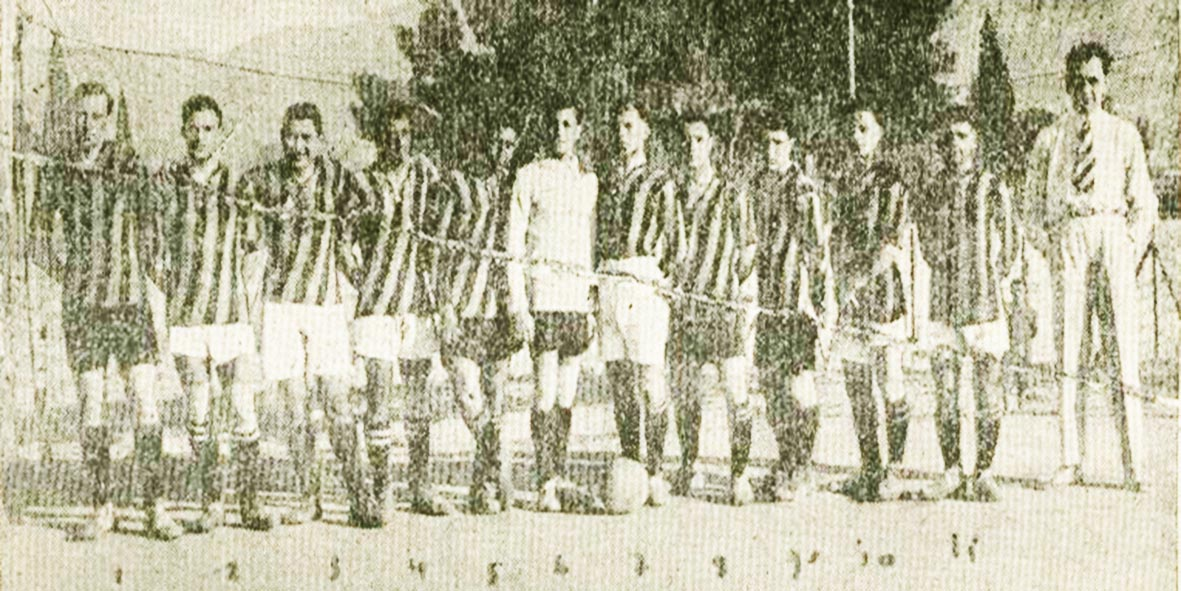
With the football team of AEK (on the right)

Upon his death, as an honour, his coffin was carried on the shoulders of eight athletes from different departments of Panathinaikos: Ikonomopoulos, Kamaras, Antoniadis (football), Zacharopoulos (track), Georgantis, Iliopoulos (volleyball), Garos, Kalogeropoulos (basketball). The home stadium of Panathinaikos at Alexandras Avenue was named after him in 1981, at a ceremony presided by the then Prime Minister Georgios Rallis.
