= List of mayors of Athens =

Mayor of Athens
- Δήμαρχος Αθηναίων
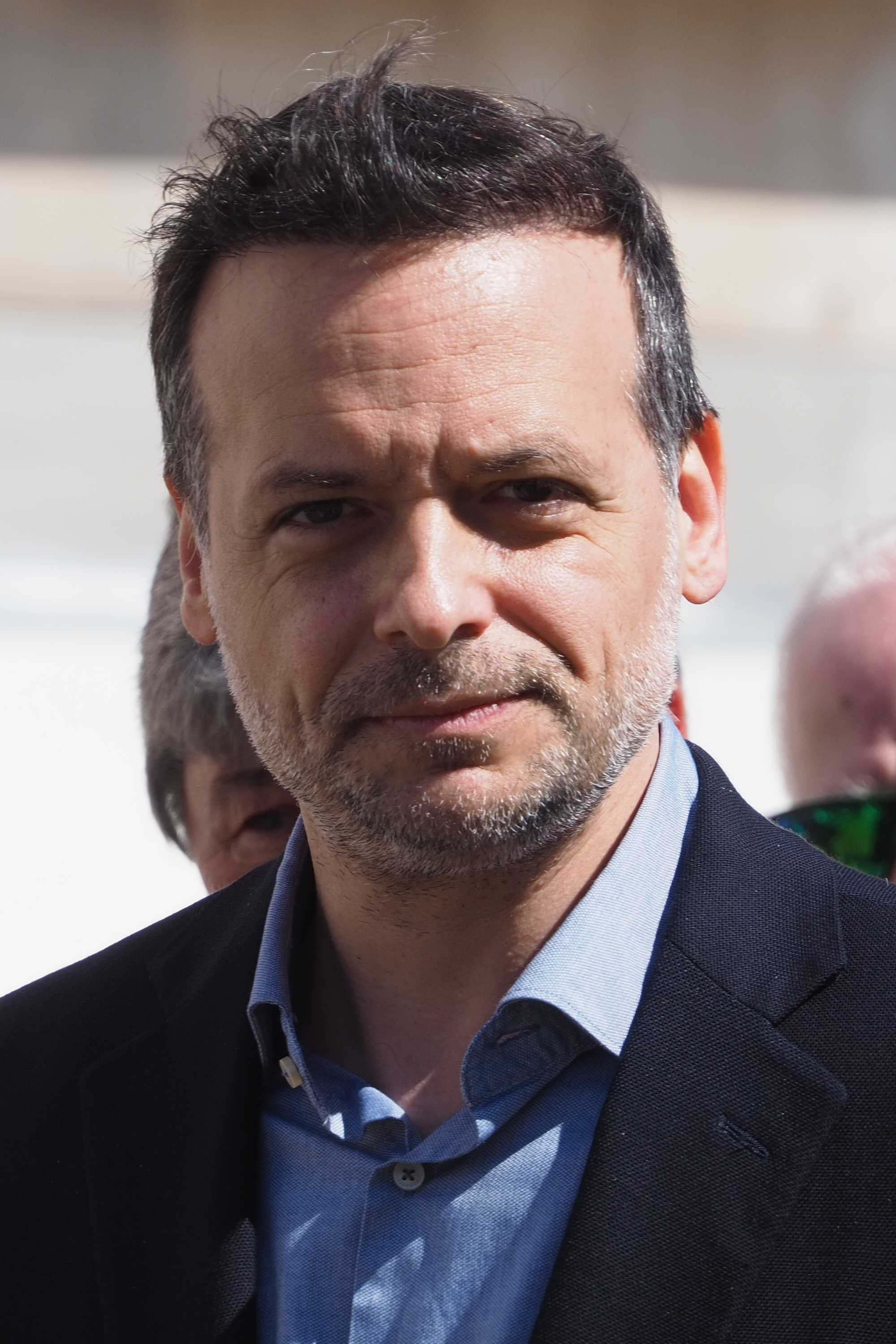
- Incumbent; Haris Doukas since 1 January 2024
- Appointer: Electorate of the Municipality of Athens
- Term length: 5 years, renewable once
- Inaugural holder: Anargyros Petrakis
- Formation: 1836
- Website: www.cityofathens.gr

The mayor of Athens is the head of Athens. The current mayor is Haris Doukas who assumed office on 1 January 2024.

== Kingdom of Greece (1832–1924) ==
Mayor		Term start	Term end	Party
1	Anargyros Petrakis	9 May 1836	25 January 1837	French Party
2	Angelos Gerontas	26 January 1837	10 June 1837	French Party
3	Dimitrios Kallifronas	11 June 1837	5 July 1837	Russian Party
(2)	Angelos Gerontas	6 July 1840	5 September 1840	French Party
(3)	Dimitrios Kallifronas	6 September 1840	15 March 1841	Russian Party
4	Dimitrios Misaraliotis	16 March 1841	15 August 1841	Russian Party
(1)	Anargyros Petrakis	16 August 1841	20 October 1843	French Party
5	Spyridon Benizelos	21 October 1843	20 January 1845	English Party
5	Spyridon Benizelos	20 January 1845	11 May 1847	English Party
5	Spyridon Benizelos	12 May 1847	11 November 1850	English Party
6	Nikolaos Zacharitsas	12 November 1850	28 August 1851	Russian Party
7	Ioannis Koniaris	29 August 1851	22 November 1853	Independent
7	Ioannis Koniaris	23 November 1853	13 November 1854	Independent
8	Konstantinos Galatis	14 November 1854	7 June 1855	Independent
8	Konstantinos Galatis	8 June 1855	24 March 1857	Independent
(5)	Spyridon Benizelos	25 March 1857	3 December 1857	English Party
9	Georgios Skoufos	3 December 1857	13 November 1861	French Party
9	Georgios Skoufos	14 November 1861	12 October 1862	French Party
10	Emmanouil Koutsikaris	13 October 1862	27 August 1865	Russian Party
11	Periklis Zacharitsas	28 August 1865	21 April 1866	Russian Party
(9)	Georgios Skoufos	22 April 1866	21 April 1870	French Party
12	Panagis Kyriakos	22 April 1870	23 April 1874	Independent
12	Panagis Kyriakos	24 April 1875	10 May 1879	Independent
13	Dimitrios Soutsos	11 May 1879	30 September 1887	New Party
13	Dimitrios Soutsos	1 October 1883	30 September 1887	New Party
14	Thrasyvoulos Papalexandris	1 October 1887	16 December 1887	Independent
15	Timoleon Filimon	17 December 1887	30 September 1891	New Party
16	Michail Melas	1 October 1891	31 October 1894	National Party
17	Dimitrios Silyvriotis	1 November 1894	30 December 1895	Independent
18	Lambros Kallifronas	1 December 1895	10 November 1899	Independent
19	Spyridon Mercouris	12 September 1899	30 December 1903	New Party
19	Spyridon Mercouris	31 December 1903	30 September 1907	New Party
19	Spyridon Mercouris	31 September 1907	30 September 1911	New Party
19	Spyridon Mercouris	31 September 1911	31 March 1914	New Party
20	Emmanouil Benakis	1 April 1914	25 November 1916	Liberal Party
21	Georgios Tsochas	26 November 1916	8 July 1917	People's Party
22	Spyridon Patsis	9 July 1917	2 November 1920	Liberal Party
(21)	Georgios Tsochas	26 November 1920	20 September 1922	People's Party
(22)	Spyridon Patsis	21 September 1922	30 November 1925	Liberal Party

== Second Hellenic Republic (1924–1935) ==
Mayor		Term start	Term end	Party
(22)	Spyridon Patsis	1 December 1925	31 August 1929	Liberal Party
(19)	Spyridon Merkouris	1 September 1929	31 March 1934	Liberal Party
23	Konstantinos Kotzias	1 April 1934	15 September 1936	Freethinkers' Party

== Kingdom of Greece (1935–1941) ==
Mayor		Term start	Term end	Party
Metaxas Regime (1936–1941)
24	Ambrosios Plytas	16 September 1936	10 May 1941	Independent
25	Konstantinos Mermigas	11 May 1941	1 August 1941	Independent

== Hellenic State (1941–1944) ==
Mayor		Term start	Term end	Party
Axis occupation (1941–1944)
26	Angelos Georgatos	2 August 1941	19 August 1944	Independent (Collaborationist)
26	Angelos Georgatos	20 August 1941	11 October 1944	Independent (Collaborationist)

== Kingdom of Greece (1944–1974) ==
Mayor		Took office	Left office	Party	Coalition
27	Aristidis Skliros	12 October 1944	17 May 1946	Liberal Party	Liberal Party; 1944 – 1946
28	Ioannis Pitsikas	18 May 1946	17 August 1950	People's Party	People's Party; 1946 – 1950
29	Antonios Ragousis	18 August 1950	19 May 1951	Independent	Independents; 1950 – 1951
(23)	Konstantinos Kotzias	20 May 1951	6 July 1951	Politically Independent Alignment	PAP – People's Party; 1951
30	Konstantinos Nikolopoulos	6 July 1951	11 July 1951	Independent	Independents; 1951
(23)	Konstantinos Kotzias	12 July 1951	8 December 1951	Politically Independent Alignment	PAP – People's Party; 1951
31	Konstantinos Deligiannis	9 December 1951	17 December 1951	Independent	Independents; 1951
(30)	Konstantinos Nikolopoulos	18 December 1951	12 February 1955	Independent	Independents; 1951 – 1955
32	Pafsanias Katsotas	13 February 1955	8 October 1955	Liberal Party	EPEK – Liberal Party – EDA; 1955
33	Phocion Theodoropoulos	9 October 1955	14 October 1955	Independent	Independents; 1955
(32)	Pafsanias Katsotas	15 October 1955	20 December 1955	Liberal Party	EPEK – Liberal Party – EDA; 1955
(33)	Phocion Theodoropoulos	21 December 1955	30 December 1955	Independent	Independents; 1955
(32)	Pafsanias Katsotas	31 December 1955	2 February 1956	Liberal Party	EPEK – Liberal Party – EDA; 1955 – 1956
34	Alexandros Magriplis	2 February 1956	10 February 1956	Independent	Independents; 1955
(32)	Pafsanias Katsotas	10 February 1956	28 June 1959	Liberal Party	Liberal Party; 1956 – 1959
35	Angelos Tsoukalas	28 June 1959	5 June 1964	Liberal Party	Liberal Party; 1959 – 1961
35	Angelos Tsoukalas	28 June 1959	5 June 1964	Centre Union	Centre Union; 1961 – 1964
36	Ioannis Papakonstantinou	6 June 1964	14 September 1964	Independent	Independents; 1964
37	Georgios Plytas	15 September 1964	9 December 1967	National Radical Union	National Radical Union; 1964 – 1967
Greek Junta (1967–1974)
38	Dimitrios Ritsos	10 December 1967	17 December 1967	Independent	Independents; 1967 – 1974
38	Dimitrios Ritsos	18 December 1967	17 September 1974	Independent	Independents; 1967 – 1974

== Third Hellenic Republic (1974–present) ==
Mayor		Took office	Left office	Party	Coalition
39	Konstantinos Darras	25 September 1974	1 June 1975	Independent	Independents; 1974 – 1975
40	Ioannis Papatheodorou	6 June 1975	31 December 1978	Centre Union – New Forces	Centre Union – New Forces; 1975 – 1979
41	Dimitris Beis	1 January 1979	31 December 1982	Panhellenic Socialist Movement	Panhellenic Socialist Movement; 1979 – 1986
41	Dimitris Beis	1 January 1983	31 December 1986	Panhellenic Socialist Movement	Panhellenic Socialist Movement; 1979 – 1986
42	Miltiadis Evert	1 January 1987	14 May 1989	New Democracy	New Democracy; 1987 – 1989
43	Nikolaos Giatrakos	15 May 1989	31 December 1990	Independent	New Democracy; 1989 – 1990
44	Antonis Tritsis	1 January 1991	7 April 1992	Greek Radical Movement	New Democracy – Greek Radical Movement; 1991 – 1992
45	Leonidas Kouris	22 April 1992	31 December 1994	New Democracy	New Democracy; 1992 – 1994
46	Dimitris Avramopoulos	1 January 1995	31 December 1998	New Democracy	New Democracy; 1995 – 2002
46	Dimitris Avramopoulos	1 January 1999	31 December 2002	New Democracy	New Democracy; 1995 – 2002
47	Dora Bakoyannis	1 January 2003	14 February 2006	New Democracy	New Democracy; 2003 – 2006
48	Theodoros Bechrakis (Acting)	24 February 2006	317 January 2007	New Democracy	New Democracy; 2006 – 2007
49	Nikitas Kaklamanis	1 January 2007	31 December 2010	New Democracy	New Democracy; 2007 – 2010
50	Giorgos Kaminis	1 January 2011	1 May 2019	PASOK	PASOK – Democratic Left – Ecologist Athens – Drassi – Liberal Alliance; 2011 – 2014
50	Giorgos Kaminis	1 January 2011	1 May 2019	PASOK	PASOK – Democratic Left – Drassi – Recreate Greece; 2014 – 2019
51	Georgios Broulias (Acting)	2 May 2019	31 August 2019	PASOK	PASOK – Democratic Left – Drassi – Recreate Greece; 2019
52	Kostas Bakoyannis	1 September 2019	31 December 2023	New Democracy	New Democracy; 2019 – 2023
53	Haris Doukas	1 January 2024	Incumbent	PASOK	PASOK – Volt; 2024 – present

== Sources ==
- Δήμος Αθηναίων: διατελέσαντες δήμαρχοι
- Γεώργιος Π. Παρασκευόπουλος (1907). Oι Δήμαρχοι των Aθηνών (1835-1907) μετά προεισαγωγής περί δημογεροντίας (in Greek). Τυπογραφείο Ρουφτάνη-Παππαγεωργίου.
