= Nikolaos Xiros =

Greek politician

Nikolaos Xiros (Greek: Νικόλαος Ξηρός; 1876–1935) was a Greek politician.

He was a lawyer. He has been elected multiple times member of Greek Parliament representing the Phthiotis and Phocis Prefecture .

He served as president of Panathinaikos A.O. (1931 - 1933).
