= Georgios Tsochas =

Greek politician (1883–1937)

Georgios Tsochas (1883–1937) was a Greek politician.

He was born in Athens. He studied law at the University of Athens. He was elected mayor of Athens in the period 1917–1919 and he also served as a mayor in 1920–1922. He was also member of Greek Parliament.

He served two times as president of Panathinaikos A.O. (1914–1918, 1935–1936).
