= Georgios Chatzopoulos =

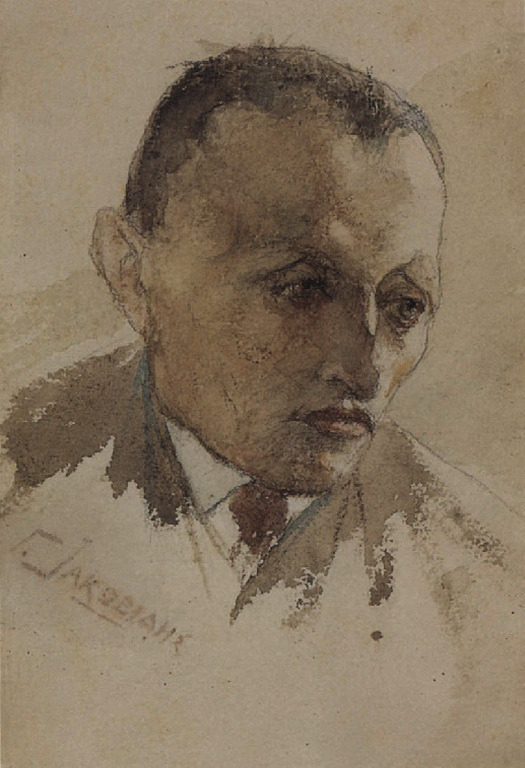
- Born: 1859; Patmos
- Died: 1935 (aged 75–76); Athens

Georgios Chatzopoulos (Greek: Γεώργιος Χατζόπουλος; 1859–1935) was a Greek painter affiliated with the Munich School of Athens.

== Biography ==
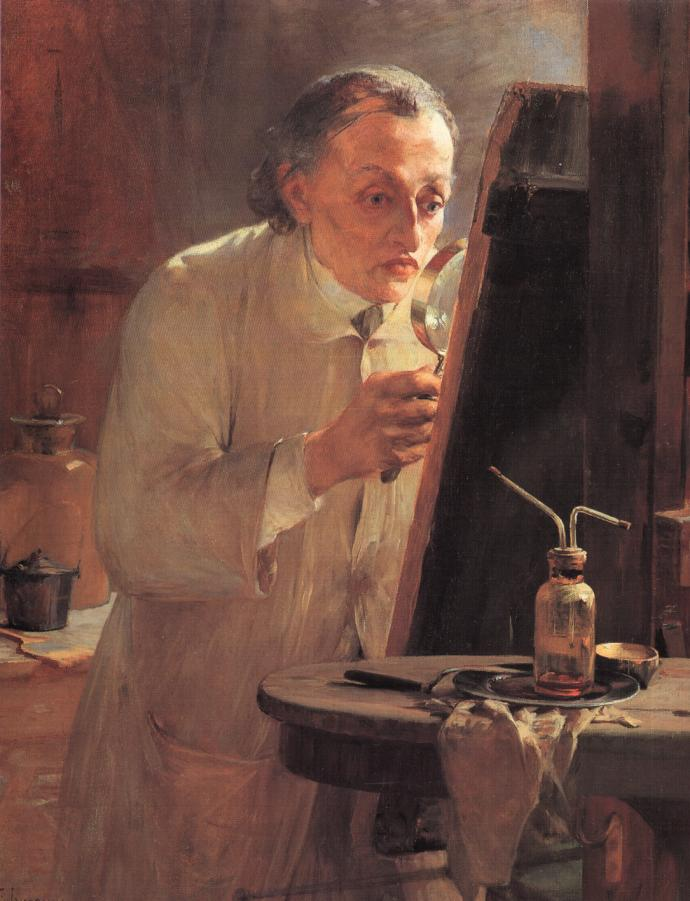
Portrait of the painter Georgios Chatzopoulos by Georgios Iakovidis.

Georgios Chatzopoulos was born in 1859 in Patmos. He studied in Athens and Munich, where he studied under the guidance of Nikolaos Gyzis from 1883 to 1887. From 1890 onward, year of his return to Greece, he held exhibitions in Athens and Patras. In 1896, he exhibited sea paintings at Zappeion. In 1906, he was appointed restorer at the National Gallery of Athens. His fame as a restorer achieved international renown when in 1921 he was called to Bucharest to take part in the restoration of old paintings, destroyed by a German restorer, at the Museum of the Romanian capital.

He drew landscapes but mainly seas. With his paintings he wanted to "portray an essence of Attica's atmosphere, not her sun [...] neither the effects of light on our soil but the rare atmospheric views which are created when the haze reaches the sea and the shore". Almost without a subject are his sea paintings: a sea and a sky.

He also executed as President of the Panathinaikos Sports Club in 1921, and he designed the cloverleaf which acts as the symbol of the team.
