= Konstantinos Kotzias =

Greek fencer and mayor

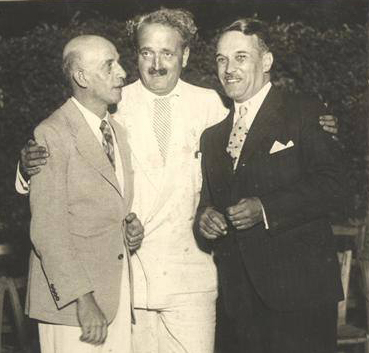
- Konstantinos Kotzias (at the centre) with orchestra conductors Dimitri Mitropoulos (left) and Filoktitis Oikonomidis (1936)

18th and 21st President of Panathinaikos AC and Panathinaikos F.C.
- In office 1937 and 1945 – 1939 and 1951
- Preceded by: Georgios Tsochas
- Succeeded by: Ioannis Moatsos

Personal details
- Born: Athens, Greece
- Profession: Lawyer

Konstantinos Kotzias

Mayor of Athens, Greece (1934 and 1951)

Konstantinos Kotzias
Personal information
- Born: 17 May 1892
- Died: 8 December 1951 (aged 59)

Sport
- Sport: Fencing

Konstantinos "Kostas" Kotzias (Greek: Κωνσταντίνος (Κώστας) Κοτζιάς; 17 May 1892 – 8 December 1951) was a Greek politician and fencer. He competed at the 1912 and 1924 Summer Olympics.

In 1934 he was elected Mayor of Athens. In the dictatorial Metaxas Regime, he served as Minister for the Capital District.

Following the suicide of Prime Minister Alexandros Koryzis on 18 January 1941, amidst the German invasion of Greece, King George II of Greece considered him to head a new cabinet, but his candidacy was unsuccessful, as he was closely associated with the Metaxas Regime and few politicians were willing to work under him; the British ambassador to Greece, Michael Palairet, also opposed his nomination in talks with the King, due to Kotzias' Germanophile reputation.

During the Axis Occupation of Greece, he lived in the United States. He was elected an MP for Athens in 1950 and was re-elected as the city's mayor in 1951, shortly before his death. Kotzia Square in Athens is named after him.

One of his sons was George Cotzias, a well known physician that pioneered the L-dopa treatment for Parkinson's disease.

== Sources ==
- Koliopoulos, Ioannis S. (1976–1977). "Η στρατιωτική και πολιτική κρίση στην Ελλάδα τον Απρίλιο του 1941" [The Military and Political Crisis in Greece in April 1941] (PDF). Μνήμων (in Greek). 6: 53–74. doi:10.12681/mnimon.174.
