= 1952–53 Panhellenic Championship =

17th season of top-tier football league in Greece

Panhellenic Championship
- Season: 1952–53
- Champions: Panathinaikos; 3rd Greek title
- Relegated: none
- Matches: 6
- Goals: 8 (1.33 per match)
- Top goalscorer: not awarded
- Biggest home win: Olympiacos 3–1 Aris
- Biggest away win: Aris 0–1 Panathinaikos
- Highest scoring: Olympiacos 3–1 Aris
- Longest unbeaten run: Panathinaikos; Olympiacos (4 Matches)
- Longest winless run: Aris (4 Matches)
- Longest losing run: Aris

The 1952–53 Panhellenic Championship was the 17th season of the highest football league of Greece. It was the last season in which the title of champion was to be claimed by the winning clubs from the three main football associations representing the major urban centers (Athens, Piraeus and Thessaloniki). It was also the last in which the final phase was held with the presence of only three teams, the champions of the above associations.

The championship was won by Panathinaikos, in a mediocre final as it developed into a final phase, where in 6 games a total of only 8 goals were scored by the three teams, all from different players, with the result that there was no top scorer for the event. The point system was: Win: 3 points - Draw: 2 points - Loss: 1 point.

== Qualification round ==
=== Athens Football Clubs Association ===
Pos	Team	Pld	W	D	L	GF	GA	GD	Pts	Qualification	PAO	APOL	AEK	PGSS	AST	FOS
1	Panathinaikos (Q)	9	6	2	1	20	9	+11	23	Final round		1–0	2–0	3–3	1–0	5–2
2	Apollon Athens	9	5	2	2	19	6	+13	21		1–1		1–0	5–2	6–0	3–1
3	AEK Athens	9	5	1	3	23	10	+13	20		2–0	0–0		—	6–1	3–0
4	Panionios	9	4	1	4	20	21	−1	18		1–4	0–3	3–1		4–1	3–2
5	Asteras Athens	9	2	1	6	6	24	−18	14		—	1–0	2–6	1–0		0–0
6	Fostiras	9	1	1	7	8	26	−18	12		0–3	—	1–5	1–4	1–0	

Source: rsssf
(Q) Qualified for the phase indicated
- The games of the last matchday were not held, because the enlisted football players were not allowed to play with their clubs due to the obligations of the Greek military team in the SISM World Football Cup. The ranking after the completion of the penultimate matchday was considered final.

=== Piraeus Football Clubs Association ===
Pos	Team	Pld	W	D	L	GF	GA	GD	Pts	Qualification	OLY	ETH	PAN	AEN	ATR	PRO
1	Olympiacos (Q)	10	9	1	0	42	2	+40	29	Final round		1–0	4–0	6–0	3–0	8–0
2	Ethnikos Piraeus	10	5	3	2	23	8	+15	23		1–1		0–0	4–1	0–1	8–1
3	Panelefsiniakos	10	5	2	3	12	15	−3	22		0–4	1–4		0–0	1–0	1–0
4	AE Nikaia	10	2	2	6	11	27	−16	16 (Note: 4th place ranking match: AE Nikaia–Atromitos Piraeus 6–0.)		0–7	1–1	1–4		3–0	1–2
5	Atromitos Piraeus	10	3	0	7	6	17	−11	16		0–4	1–2	1–2	1–0		2–1
6	Proodeftiki	10	2	0	8	9	34	−25	14		1–4	0–3	1–3	2–4	1–0	

Source: rsssf
(Q) Qualified for the phase indicated

=== Macedonia Football Clubs Association ===
Pos	Team	Pld	W	D	L	GF	GA	GD	Pts	Qualification	ARIS	IRA	APOL	PAOK	MAK	MEG
1	Aris (Q)	10	5	3	2	13	6	+7	23 (Note: 1st place ranking matches: Aris–Iraklis 0–0, 1–0.)	Final round		0–0	3–1	1–0	2–1	1–1
2	Iraklis	10	5	3	2	11	7	+4	23		1–0		1–1	1–0	3–1	1–2
3	Apollon Kalamarias	10	4	3	3	17	18	−1	21		1–1	2–2		0–3	3–1	2–0
4	PAOK	10	4	1	5	11	11	0	19		0–3	0–1	1–2		2–1	2–1
5	Makedonikos	10	3	2	5	14	15	−1	18		1–0	0–1	4–1	1–1		1–1
6	Megas Alexandros	10	2	2	6	9	18	−9	16		0–2	1–0	2–4	0–2	1–3	

Source: rsssf
(Q) Qualified for the phase indicated

== Final round ==
=== League table ===
Pos	Team	Pld	W	D	L	GF	GA	GD	Pts	PAO	OLY	ARIS
1	Panathinaikos (C)	4	2	2	0	3	1	+2	10		0–0	1–0
2	Olympiacos	4	1	3	0	4	2	+2	9	1–1		3–1
3	Aris	4	0	1	3	1	5	−4	5	0–1	0–0	

Source: rsssf
(C) Champions

== Top scorers ==
Rank	Player	Club	Goals
1	(Greece) Kostas Chatzinikolaou	Panathinaikos	1
1	(Greece) Filippos Asimakopoulos	Panathinaikos	1
1	(Greece) Giannis Nempidis	Panathinaikos	1
1	(Greece) Giorgos Kopanidis	Olympiacos	1
1	(Greece) Georgios Darivas	Olympiacos	1
1	(Greece) Giorgos Kansos	Olympiacos	1
1	(Greece) Dimitrios Kokkinakis	Olympiacos	1
1	(Greece) Angelos Papangelou	Aris	1
