= Panathinaikos F.C. =

Greek association football club

Panathinaikos
- Full name: Παναθηναϊκός Αθλητικός Όμιλος; Panathinaïkós Athlitikós Ómilos (Pan-Athenian Athletic Club)
- Nicknames: Trifýlli (The Shamrock); Prássinoi (The Greens)
- Short name: PAO (Greek: ΠΑΟ)
- Founded: 3 February 1908; 118 years ago
- Ground: Athens Olympic Stadium
- Capacity: 69,618
- Owner: Giannis Alafouzos
- President: Giannis Alafouzos
- Head coach: Jacob Neestrup
- League: Super League Greece
- 2025–26: Super League Greece, 4th of 14
- Website: pao.gr
Home colours	Away colours	Third colours

Panathinaikos Football Club (Greek: ΠΑΕ Παναθηναϊκός Α.Ο. [panaθinaiˈkos]), known as Panathinaikos, or by its full name, and the name of its parent sports club, Panathinaikos A.O. or PAO (Παναθηναϊκός Αθλητικός Όμιλος; Panathinaikós Athlitikós Ómilos, lit. 'Pan-Athenian Athletic Club'), is a Greek professional football club based in Athens, Greece.

Panathinaikos was founded in 1908 as "Podosfairikos Omilos Athinon" (Football Club of Athens) by Giorgos Kalafatis. They play in Super League Greece, being one of the most successful clubs in Greek football and one of the three clubs which have never been relegated from the top division. Among their major titles are 20 Greek Championships, 20 Greek Cups, achieving eight times the Double and 3 Greek Super Cups. They are also one of three clubs to win a Greek championship undefeated, going without a loss in a top-flight campaign in the 1963–64 season. Panathinaikos is the only Greek team that has reached the UEFA Champions League final, in 1971 (which they lost to Ajax), and also the semi-finals twice, in 1985 and 1996. It is also the only Greek team that has played for the Intercontinental Cup (1971). Furthermore, they have reached the quarter-finals of the Champions League on another two occasions (in 1992 and 2002), as well as the quarter-finals of the UEFA Cup twice (1988 and 2003). They have also won the Balkans Cup in 1977. Panathinaikos is one of the most widely supported clubs in Greece, based on national opinion polls. Panathinaikos is also a member of the European Club Association.

They have played their home games at the Leoforos Alexandras Stadium, considered their traditional home ground, and the Athens Olympic Stadium. Panathinaikos hold a long-term rivalry with Olympiacos, the clash between the two teams being referred to as the "Derby of the Eternal Enemies".

== History ==
=== Early years ===
According to the official history of the club, Panathinaikos was founded by the 17 years old track and field athlete Giorgos Kalafatis on 3 February 1908, when he decided to break away from Panellinios Gymnastikos Syllogos following the club's decision to discontinue its football team. The young athlete was followed by the athletes Alexandros Kalafatis (the founder's brother), and Mr. Doukakis, Bouboulis, Chrisis, Granitsas, Mantzakos, Papageorgiou, Gaetas, Demertzis, Stavropoulos, Paschos, Misakian, Reppas, Sapounias and Garoufalias.

The name of the new club was "Podosferikos Omilos Athinon" (Football Club of Athens). It was founded with the aim of spreading and making more known this new sport (football) to the Athenian and Greek public in general. Also, the intention of the founders was to create a team for all of Athens and to be connected with the rest of the European football movement, which was already active. According to Loukas Panourgias, "they wanted their Club not to be like all the others, but a team for Athens, for the entire capital." Establishing a football-only club at that time was a challenge to the prevailing norms of Greek society. "The founding of a football club at a time when this sport was universally regarded as a street game and was openly persecuted by everyone, both authorities and non-authorities alike, was a clear act of rebellion against the prevailing perceptions of sports at the time (Athlitismos, 1927)."

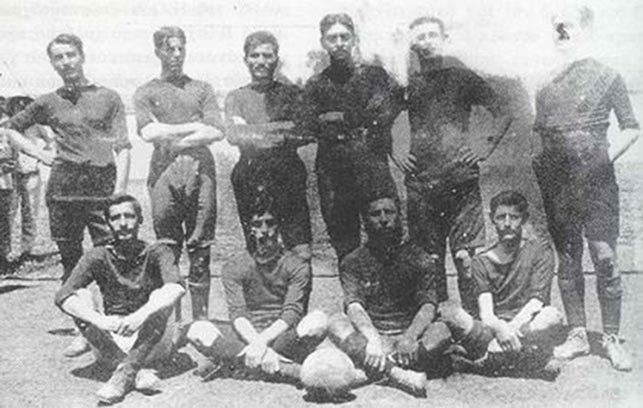
The first team in 1908

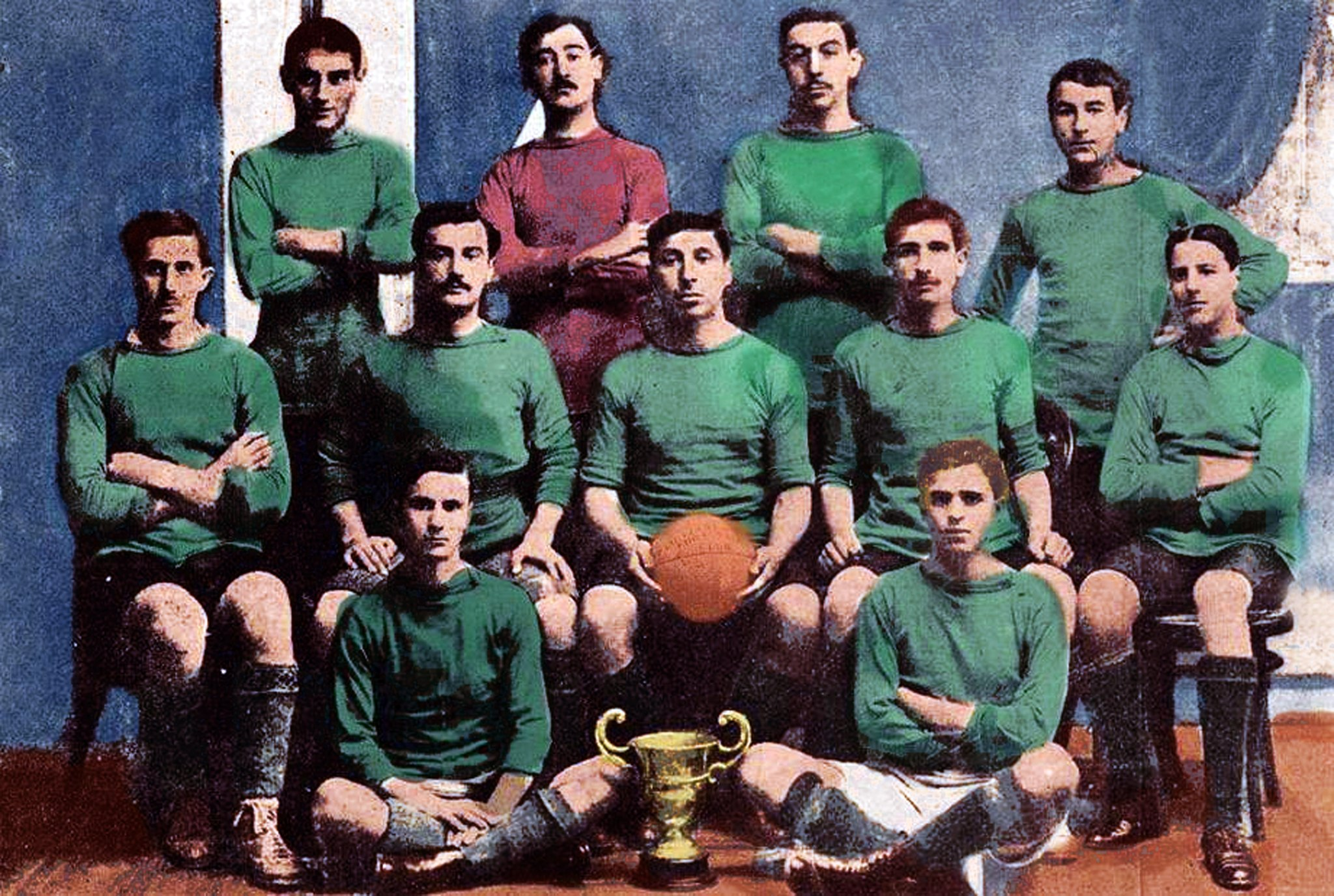
The team in 1911, with Giorgos Kalafatis (center, holding the ball) and coach John Cyril Campbell (sitting on the far right).

The first president elected was Alexandros Kalafatis, brother of Giorgos. The ground of the team was in Patission Street. Oxford University athlete John Cyril Campbell was brought in as coach, the first time that a foreigner was appointed as the coach of a Greek team. Konstantinos Tsiklitiras, the great Greek athlete of the early 20th century, played as goalkeeper for the new team.

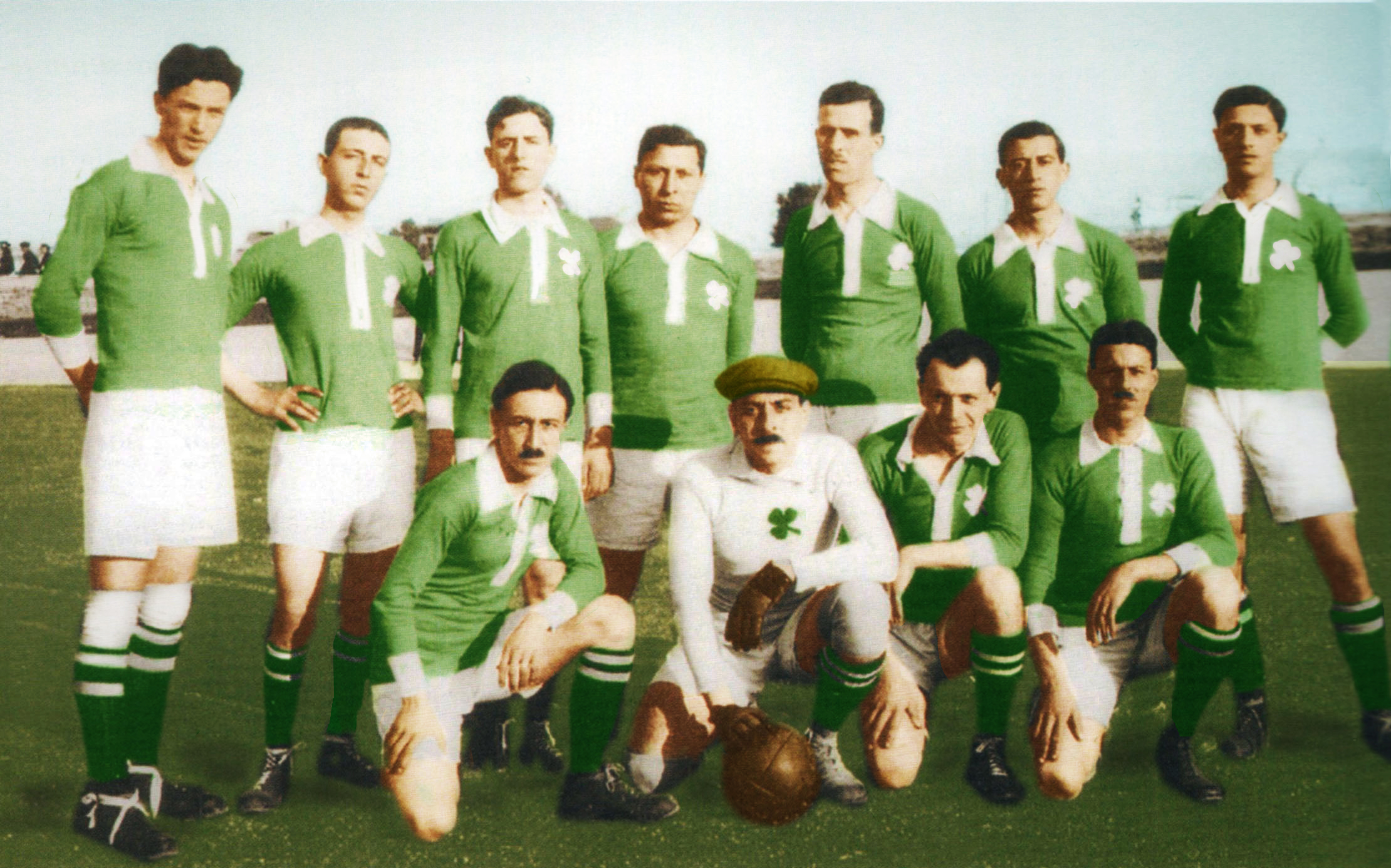
The team in 1921

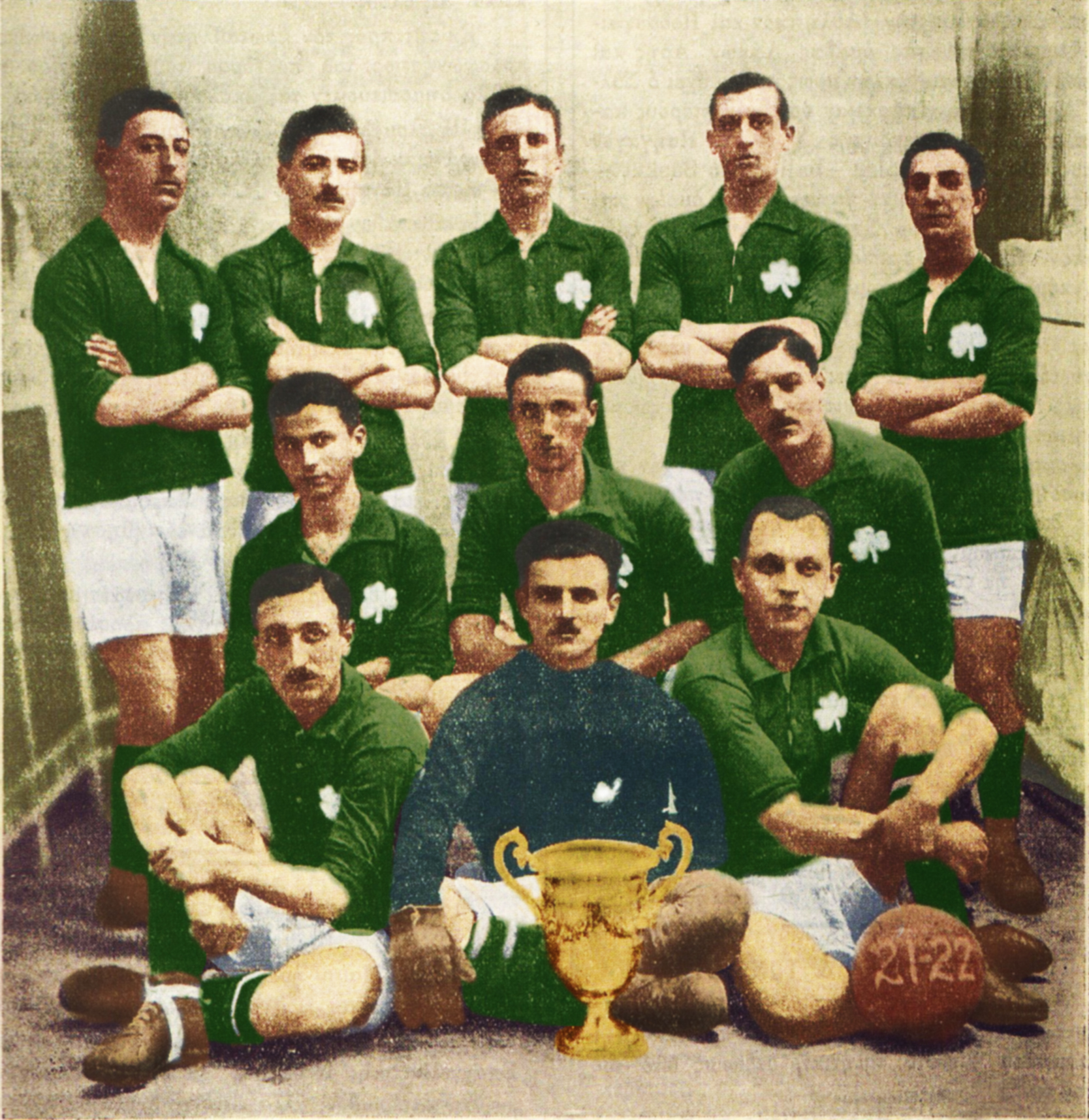
The champion team of 1922

During the turbulent 1910s, marked by the Balkan Wars and World War I, football activity declined. Goalkeeper Konstantinos Tsiklitiras volunteered for the army, fought at the Battle of Bizani, contracted meningitis, and died in Athens at 24. Founder Giorgos Kalafatis served in all three wars, eventually reaching the rank of rear admiral and later on served as a military doctor in the Asia Minor campaign. In 1910, after a dispute among a number of board members, Kalafatis with most of the players — also followed by Campbell —decided to pull out of POA and secured a new ground in Amerikis Square (and the next year the team won the 1911 SEGAS Championship). Subsequently, the name of the club changed to Panellinios Podosferikos Omilos ("Panhellenic Football Club") and green and white were established as its colours. By 1914, Campbell had returned to England but the club was already at the top of Greek football with players such as Michalis Papazoglou, Michalis Rokkos and Loukas Panourgias and went on to win the football tournament of 1915.

In 1918, the team adopted the trifolium (shamrock) as its emblem, symbol of harmony, unity, nature, fertility and good luck, as proposed by Michalis Papazoglou. In 1921 and 1922, the Athens-Piraeus FCA organised the first two post-WWI championships, in both of which PPO was declared champion. By that stage, the club had outgrown both the grounds in Patission Street and Amerikis Square, due mainly to its expansion in other sports, and began to look at vacant land in the area of Perivola on Alexandras Avenue as its potential new ground. After long discussions with the Municipality of Athens, an agreement was finally reached and in 1922 Leoforos ("Avenue" in Greek) was granted to the club.

The move to a permanent home ground also heralded another — final — name change to Panathinaikos Athlitikos Omilos (PAO), "All-Athenian Athletic Club", on 15 March 1924, from now on a multi-sport club. However, the decision was already taken by 1922.

In 1926, the Hellenic Football Federation (HFF) was founded and the first Panhellenic Championship under its authority took place in 1927. The club dominated Athenian football, winning the Athens championships of 1925, 1926, 1927 and 1929 organized by the Athens Football Clubs Association.

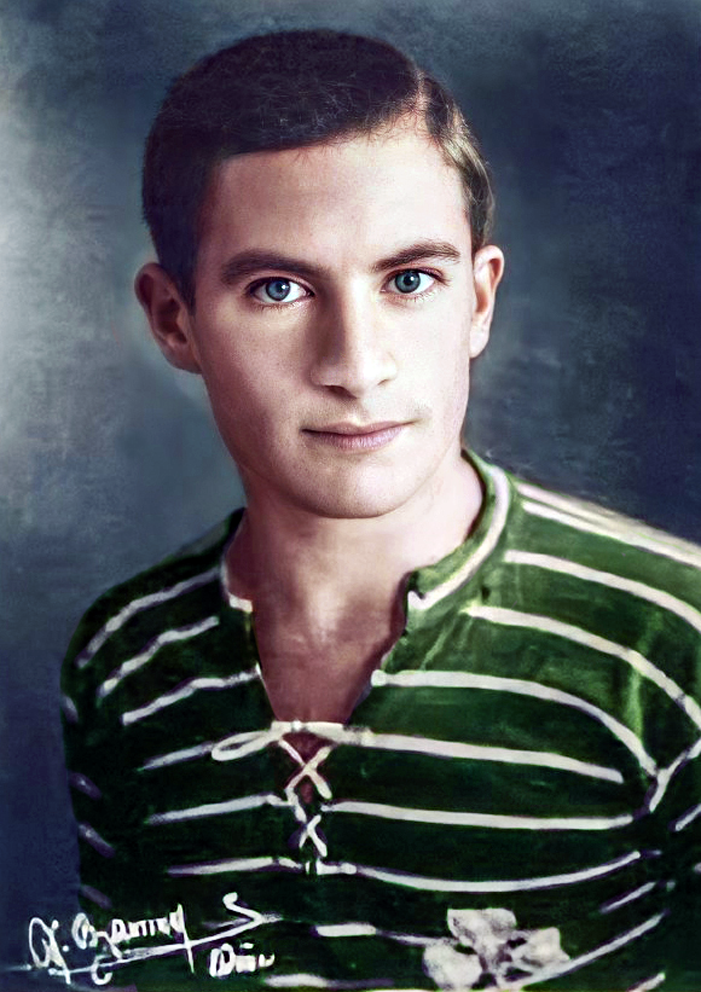
Angelos Messaris, the legendary player of the '30s

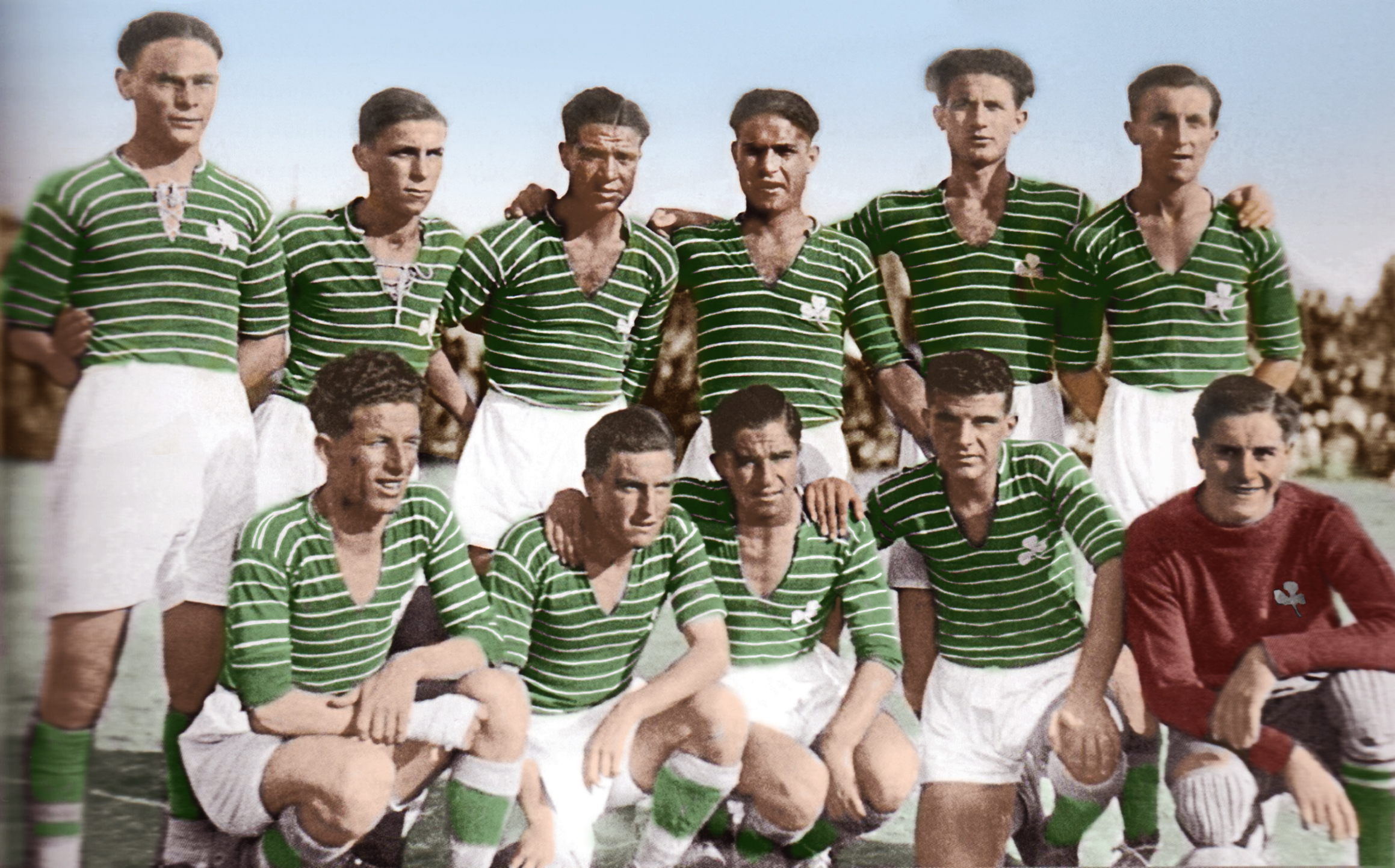
The champion team of 1930

Panathinaikos won undefeated the Championship of 1929–30 under the guidance of József Künsztler and Angelos Messaris as the team's star player. Other notable players of this Belle Époque period of the team were Antonis Migiakis, Diomidis Symeonidis, Mimis Pierrakos and Stefanos Pierrakos, among others. They thrashed rivals Olympiacos 8–2, a result that still remains the biggest win either team has achieved against its rival, with Messaris scoring three goals. The team also defeated Aris 1–4 away in Thessaloniki. Messaris, who scored again three goals, became a hero and chant for the fans.

=== Crisis and WWII years ===
In 1931, a serious disagreement between leading board member Apostolos Nikolaidis from one side, and some players (most notably Angelos Messaris) and club's officials on the other side, regarding the professionalisation in the Greek football, which lasted two years, damaged the club and led to a counterproductive period. In the meantime, the HFF Greek Cup had commenced in 1932. The last bright moment for the Greens before World War II was winning the Cup for the first time in 1940 against Aris, 3–1. In 1940, with the break out of the Greco-Italian War, many players of the club joined the Hellenic Army. Mimis Pierrakos was killed during the war (later, during the 1950s, his bones were transferred from Albania back to Athens). During the Axis Occupation of Greece from 1941 to 1944, the Leoforos stadium was also used by the occupiers for friendly games between teams of the German and Italian armies. Also during the occupation, many players of Panathinaikos became members of United Panhellenic Organization of Youth (EPON) resistance organisation, while Michalis Papazoglou had a leading role in the resistance group of Jerzy Iwanow-Szajnowicz.

After this long crisis period, Panathinaikos had to wait until 1949 to win again a Greek Championship under the guidance of the Austrian coach Johann Strnad. That same year, Vangelis Panakis and Kostas Linoxilakis came to the club and quickly became the side's new star players. Panathinaikos was again champion for the 1952–53 Panhellenic Championship.

Until 1959, the team had also won seven of the last eight Athens Championships, the regional championships organised in Greece. In 1959, Mimis Domazos, the emblematic captain of the team, made his first appearance with Panathinaikos and the same year took place the first season under the new system of Alpha Ethniki (1959–60 Alpha Ethniki). Panathinaikos was the champion team.

=== 1960s: The Golden Decade, the Bobek's rejuvenation ===
During the next years, Panathinaikos were again champions in 1961, 1962, 1964, 1965, 1969 and 1970. Moreover, the team won two more Greek Cups, in 1967 and 1969. Also, during these years, a long process of rejuvenation took place in the club. Notable players retired, such as Panakis, Linoxilakis, Takis Loukanidis and Andreas Papaemmanouil, and the team had to count on young players like Domazos, Antonis Antoniadis, Anthimos Kapsis, Kostas Eleftherakis and Takis Ikonomopoulos.

Stjepan Bobek was the main contributor to this process. In 1963, he became the club's head coach, changing the playing style of the team to a 4–3–3 and created a new team based on young players (the "Bobek's rejuvenation"). Under his guidance, Panathinaikos won the Championship of 1964 without a loss, making them one of the two teams that has won the Greek Championship (with its modern system) undefeated. Notable players of the team included Panakis, Domazos, Takis Ikonomopoulos, Totis Filakouris, Frangiskos Sourpis and Aristidis Kamaras.

With the establishment of the Greek military regime, the president of the club, Loukas Panourgias, was forced out of the presidency. The contract of Bobek was cancelled by the State, while Apostolos Nikolaidis, the old player, manager and official of the club, went on trial.

In 1967, the great Béla Guttmann came as coach, but he soon left and ex-player Lakis Petropoulos was appointed. Under his guidance, Panathinaikos won the championships of 1969 (with a double) and 1970.

=== Puskás years and the epic road to Wembley ===
Line-up of the 1971 European Cup Final.

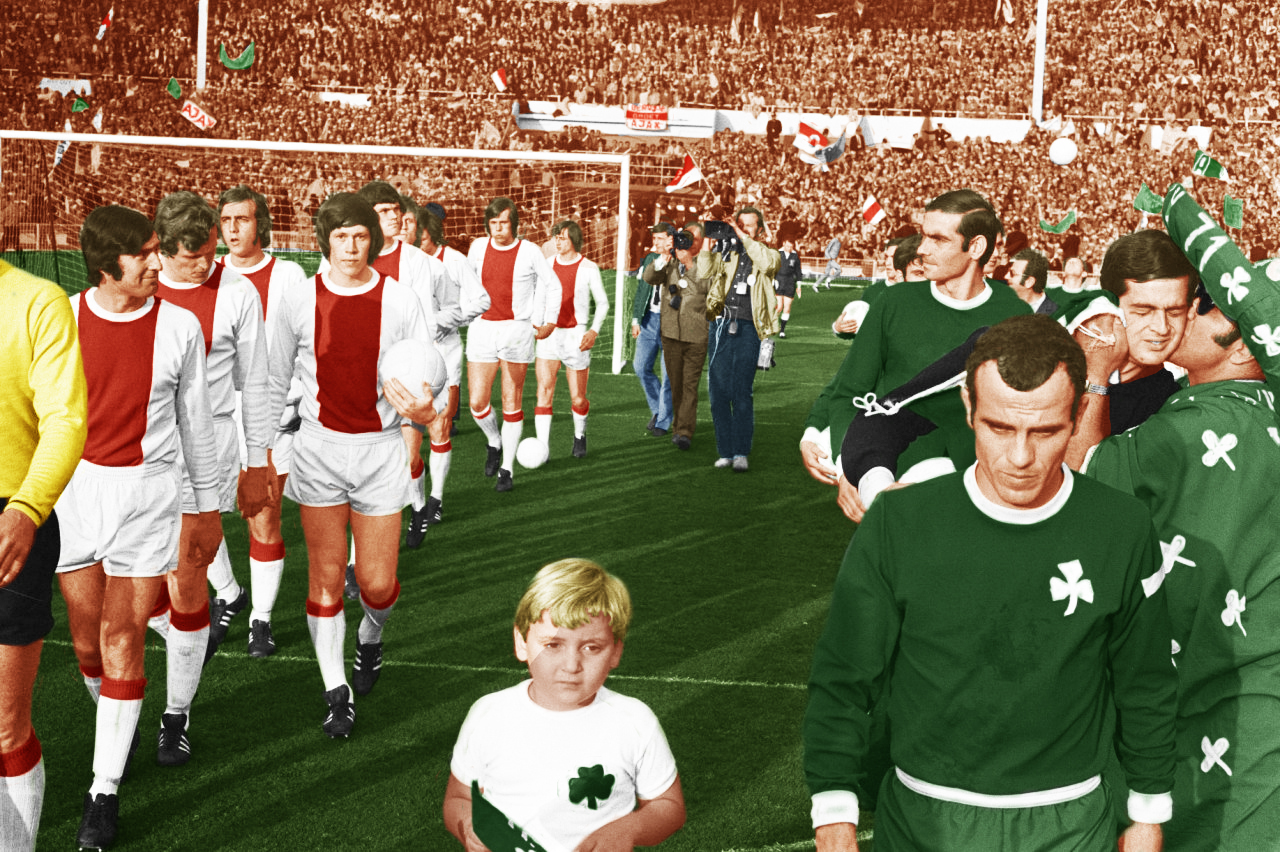
The team in the 1971 European Cup Final against Ajax.

==== 1970–71 European Cup finalists ====
In 1971, under the guidance of Ferenc Puskás, Panathinaikos were 1970–71 European Cup finalists, the first and only Greek team until today, losing 2–0 to Ajax at Wembley Stadium. In the road to the final, they eliminated Jeunesse Esch, Slovan Bratislava, Everton and Red Star Belgrade. Notable players included the captain Mimis Domazos, Anthimos Kapsis, Aristidis Kamaras, Kostas Eleftherakis, Totis Filakouris and the goalkeepers Takis Ikonomopoulos and Vasilis Konstantinou. Antonis Antoniadis was the top scorer in the competition scoring ten goals. In a warmup game before the 1971 final, they defeated Worcester Park 16 - 0.

In the same year, Panathinaikos played for the 1971 Intercontinental Cup (due to the refusal of Ajax to participate), where they lost to Uruguayan club Nacional (1–1 in Greece, 2–1 in Uruguay). Totis Filakouris was the scorer for the Greek club.

During the last amateur years of Greek football, the Trifolium won one more Championship in 1972. Antonis Antoniadis was again top scorer with 39 goals (also second in Europe). His record remains until today in the Greek league.

With the collapse of the military regime, Apostolos Nikolaidis became again active for the club and was appointed honorary president of Panathinaikos. In 1975, one of the greatest coaches of his era, the Brazilian Aymoré Moreira, who mainly worked in Brazil (World Cup Champion with the Brazil national team in 1962), was appointed. After a year and a half of poor results, however, he was replaced by Kazimierz Górski. With Górski, Panathinaikos won the double in 1977, followed by a Balkans Cup victory in the same year. Notable foreign players who played for the team during the late 1970s include Juan Ramón Verón, Araquem de Melo and Óscar Álvarez.

=== Vardinogiannis era (1979–2012) ===
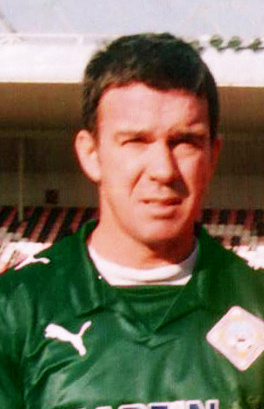
Dimitris Saravakos (2009). Top scorer in the 1987–88 UEFA Cup, one of the best players in the club's history and Greek football.

In July 1979, Greek football turned professional. The Vardinogiannis family purchased PAO's football department and Giorgos Vardinogiannis became president. Panathinaikos were one of the first Greek clubs that formed a women's team, in 1980.

The transformation period lasted a few years, but in 1982 the club won its first professional era trophy, the Greek Cup, and during the 1980s they would go on winning two championships (1984, 1986), four more Greek Cups (1984, 1986—with a 4–0 against Olympiacos in the final—, 1988, 1989) and the Greek Super Cup in 1988. The great star of the team during these years was Dimitris Saravakos, nicknamed "The Kid." Saravakos, a high-technique explosive midfielder and iconic captain of Panathinaikos, was the alsolute idol for the fans during the 1980s, while other players included Nikos Sarganis, Spiros Livathinos, Velimir Zajec, Juan Ramón Rocha, Christos Dimopoulos and Giannis Kyrastas.

In the 1984–85 season, Panathinaikos, with coach Jacek Gmoch and stars Dimitris Saravakos, Velimir Zajec, Juan Ramón Rocha and Ioannis Kyrastas, made a run in Europe, eliminating Feyenoord, Linfield and IFK Göteborg to reach the semi-finals of the European Cup, where they were knocked out by Liverpool.

In 1987–88, they made it also to the quarter-finals of the UEFA Cup, eliminating Juventus, Auxerre and Budapest Honvéd. Dimitris Saravakos was top scorer of the competition.

The 1990s were an even more successful period for the club, both nationally and internationally. Four Greek championships (1990, 1991, 1995, 1996), four Greek Cups (1991, 1993, 1994, 1995) and two Greek Super Cups (1993, 1994) were awarded to the club.

In the 1991–92 season, Panathinaikos reached also the last eight of the European Cup and took part in the first ever European tournament to have a group stage.

In 1995–96, with Juan Ramon Rocha as coach and key players Krzysztof Warzycha, Józef Wandzik, Stratos Apostolakis, Georgios Georgiadis, Dimitris Markos, Giannis Kalitzakis, Georgios Donis and Juan Jose Borrelli, Panathinaikos reached the Champions League semi-finals, finishing first in the group stage against Nantes, Porto, Aalborg BK and eliminating Legia Warsaw in the quarter-finals.

In the semi-finals, Panathinaikos faced Ajax, recording an impressive 0–1 first leg away victory with Krzysztof Warzycha scoring the winning goal. Ajax had a record of 22 undefeated international matches until then, with Panathinaikos breaking their series. The Greek team, however, suffered a 0–3 defeat on the second leg. Thus, Panathinaikos was denied entry to a Champions League final once more.

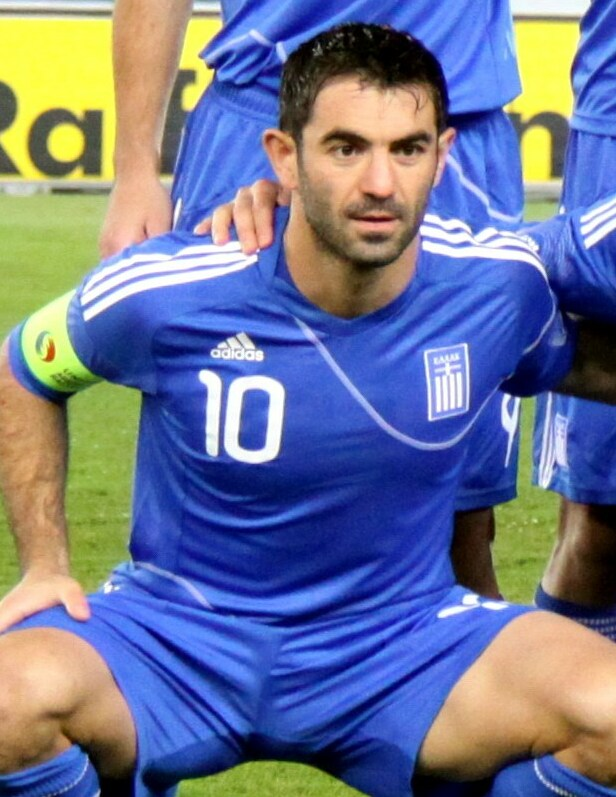
Giorgos Karagounis, captain of Panathinaikos and the Greece national football team.

In the summer of 2000, President Giorgos Vardinogiannis resigned from his duties with complaints for the refereeing situation in Greece and passed his shares to his nephew Giannis Vardinogiannis, who changed the style of the club's management. Angelos Anastasiadis was initially appointed coach of the team and later the ex-player Giannis Kyrastas.

With the arrival of coach Sergio Markarián, Panathinaikos reached the quarter-finals of the 2001–02 UEFA Champions League, being eliminated by Barcelona. Panathinaikos had passed the first group stage as the top club against Arsenal, Mallorca and Schalke 04, and the second group stage as second against Real Madrid, Porto and Sparta Prague.

In the first leg of the quarter-finals, Panathinaikos managed to defeat Barcelona by 1–0 in Leoforos Alexandras Stadium. The second leg in Camp Nou was to be an eventful one. Panathinaikos scored first thanks to a beautiful goal by Michalis Konstantinou but eventually was eliminated as Barcelona scored three goals.

Ιn Europe, Panathinaikos made it to the quarter-finals of UEFA Cup quarter-finals. En route, the Greek team had knocked-out Litex Lovech, Fenerbahçe (with an impressive 4–1 win in Leoforos Alexandras Stadium), Slovan Liberec and Anderlecht. During the quarter-finals, although winning the first match in Estádio das Antas against eventual winners of the trophy FC Porto of José Mourinho, with the header of Emmanuel Olisadebe, they were eliminated in the second leg after extra time.

Notable players of this team included Takis Fyssas, Giorgos Karagounis, Antonis Nikopolidis, Angelos Basinas, Nikos Lyberopoulos, Michalis Konstantinou, Giourkas Seitaridis, Sotirios Kyrgiakos, Paulo Sousa, Goran Vlaović, Rene Henriksen, Joonas Kolkka, Jan Michaelsen and Emmanuel Olisadebe, considered by the fans one of the best teams in the club's history.

During 2002–03 Alpha Ethniki season, they lost the Greek championship in the last two games by arch-rivals Olympiacos.

Under the guidance of Israeli coach Itzhak Shum, Panathinaikos managed to win the championship in 2004. They won also the Cup, beating Olympiacos 3–1 in the final, making the double. New players like Ezequiel González, Lucian Sanmartean and Markus Münch had signed the summer before. In the Champions League, they came third in the group stage facing Manchester United, VfB Stuttgart and Rangers.

However, Shum was unexpectedly fired early in the next season (2004–05) and Zdeněk Ščasný succeeded him on the bench. Panathinaikos finished second in the championship, while in the Champions League they came again third in the group stage facing Rosenborg, PSV and Arsenal. They continued in the UEFA Cup, where they were eliminated by Sevilla.

In 2005, major changes were made in the team's roster. Players like Angelos Basinas and Michalis Konstantinou departed, while others like Flávio Conceição, Igor Bišćan and Andreas Ivanschitz arrived. Ščasný gave his seat to Alberto Malesani. At the start of the 2006–07 season, Malesani left the team and was replaced by Hans Backe, who left only three months after his appointment; Víctor Muñoz was his replacement. For the 2007–08 season, Panathinaikos hired José Peseiro.

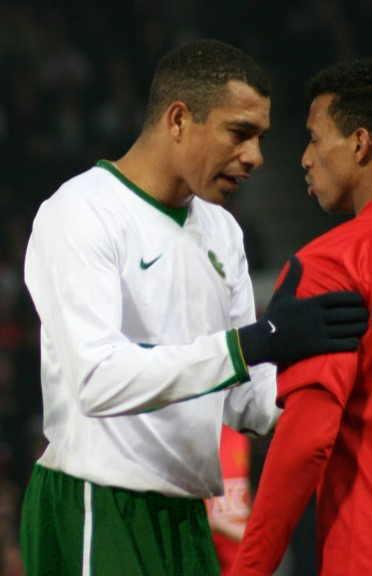
Gilberto Silva

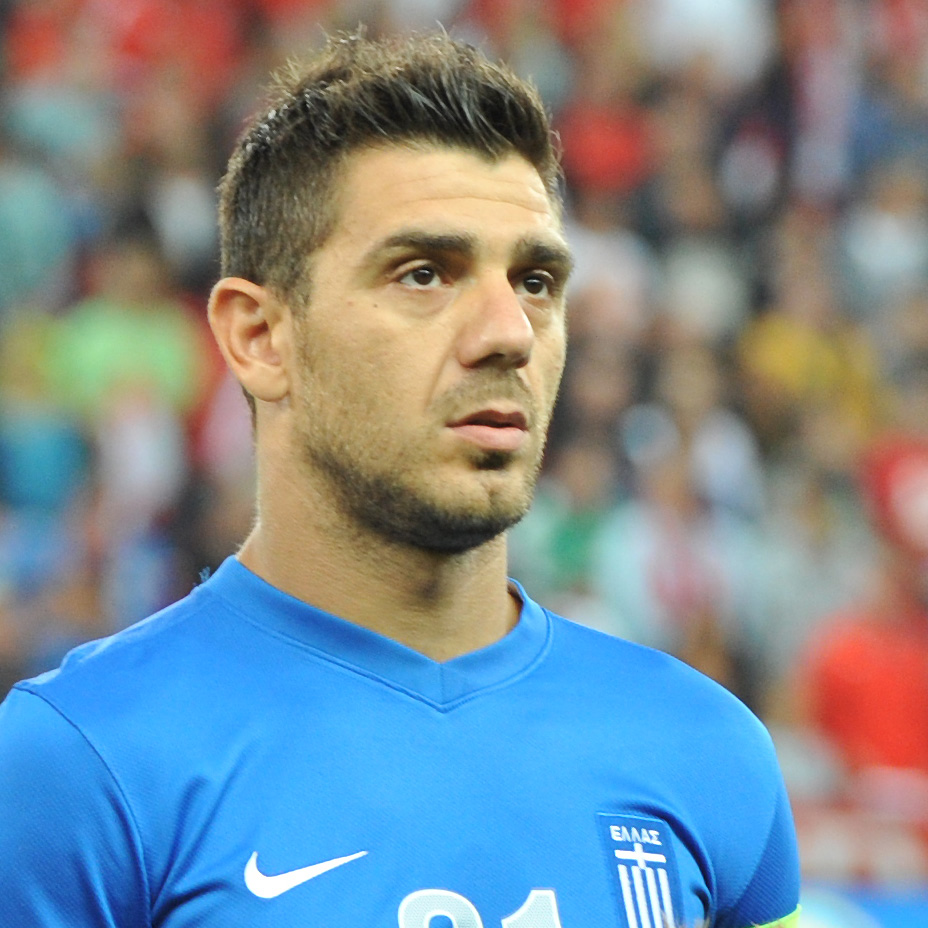
Kostas Katsouranis

On 22 April 2008, and under pressure from the fan base, main shareholder Giannis Vardinogiannis gave a press conference in which he announced the decision of his family to reduce their share in the club to 50%—after 30 years of full ownership—through an €80 million increase of the company's capital stock. After the negotiations and the share capital increase, the Vardinogiannis family would hold 56% of the club, the amateur Club 10% and the other shareholders 34% (with main investors Andreas Vgenopoulos, Pavlos Giannakopoulos, Adamantios Polemis and Nikos Pateras). Nikos Pateras was selected to be the new president of the club.

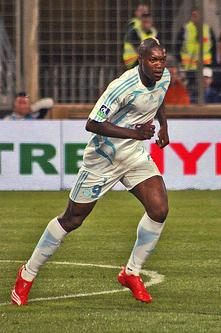
Djibril Cissé, two consecutive seasons top scorer for the Greek league

Following the major changes in 2008, Panathinaikos hired Henk ten Cate as coach and bought many expensive players, such as Gilberto Silva from Arsenal and Gabriel from Fluminense. In the 2008–09 season, the Greens proved that they could hold their weight in the Champions League by reaching the last 16. However, they disappointed in the Super League, finishing third in the regular season, though they managed to come second overall after the playoff mini-league.

The 2009–10 season was a successful one for Panathinaikos. During the summer transfer period, the club bought Djibril Cissé from Marseille, Kostas Katsouranis from Benfica, Sebastián Leto from Liverpool and various other players, spending more than €35 million in total. Henk ten Cate left in December to be replaced by Nikos Nioplias. The team managed to reach the last 16 of the Europa League, eliminating A.S. Roma after two amazing matches in Olympic Stadium of Athens and Stadio Olimpico. Panathinaikos also won both the Super League and the Greek Cup, beating Aris by 1–0 in the final of the latter, thanks to a goal by Sebastián Leto.

In 2011, due to financial problems and management disagreements, Panathinaikos sold Cissé for €5.8 million to Lazio and first-choice goalkeeper Alexandros Tzorvas to Palermo to reduce the budget. New players then entered, such as Quincy Owusu-Abeyie, Toché, Vitolo and Zeca. The club also changed their president and chose Dimitris Gontikas to be the new chairman. Panathinaikos failed to qualify to the group stage of 2011–12 Champions League after they were knocked out by Odense BK 4–5 on aggregate.

=== Alafouzos era (2012–present) ===
Panathinaikos' downfall continued as a result of the serious riots in the Panathinaikos–Olympiacos derby of 18 March 2012. The entire board quit and Panathinaikos remained headless for about two months. However, the owner of Skai TV, Giannis Alafouzos, devised a plan to take Vardinogiannis' shares (54.7%) and make them available to fans around Greece so that everyone could contribute a desired amount, so that Panathinaikos could overcome the crisis. His plan seemed to be working, as a new 20-member board was elected with Dimitris Gontikas at the president's chair again, though it was yet to be seen how the fans would respond to Panathinaikos' call for help.

On 2 July 2012, the PAO Alliance 2012 finally opened to the public so that everyone could be a member and contribute a desired amount in return for privileges. After a few weeks of operation, 8,606 members had signed up, some of which were current or former Panathinaikos players, including Jean-Alain Boumsong, Sotiris Ninis, Gilberto Silva and Djibril Cissé, among others.

On 18 July 2012, marked a historical day in Panathinaikos history, as Giannis Vardinogiannis gave his shares—54.7% of Panathinaikos—to the Panathinaikos Alliance, thereby allowing Panathinaikos to have a fresh start with their own fans at the steering wheel, who through elections (among the members of the Alliance) they compose the board of directors and elect the club's president. The first president elected was Giannis Alafouzos.

The first season with the Panathinaikos Alliance at the helm was nothing short of abysmal for the club. While still enduring financial troubles, Panathinaikos finished sixth in the championship and failed to qualify for the European competition for the first time in 16 years.

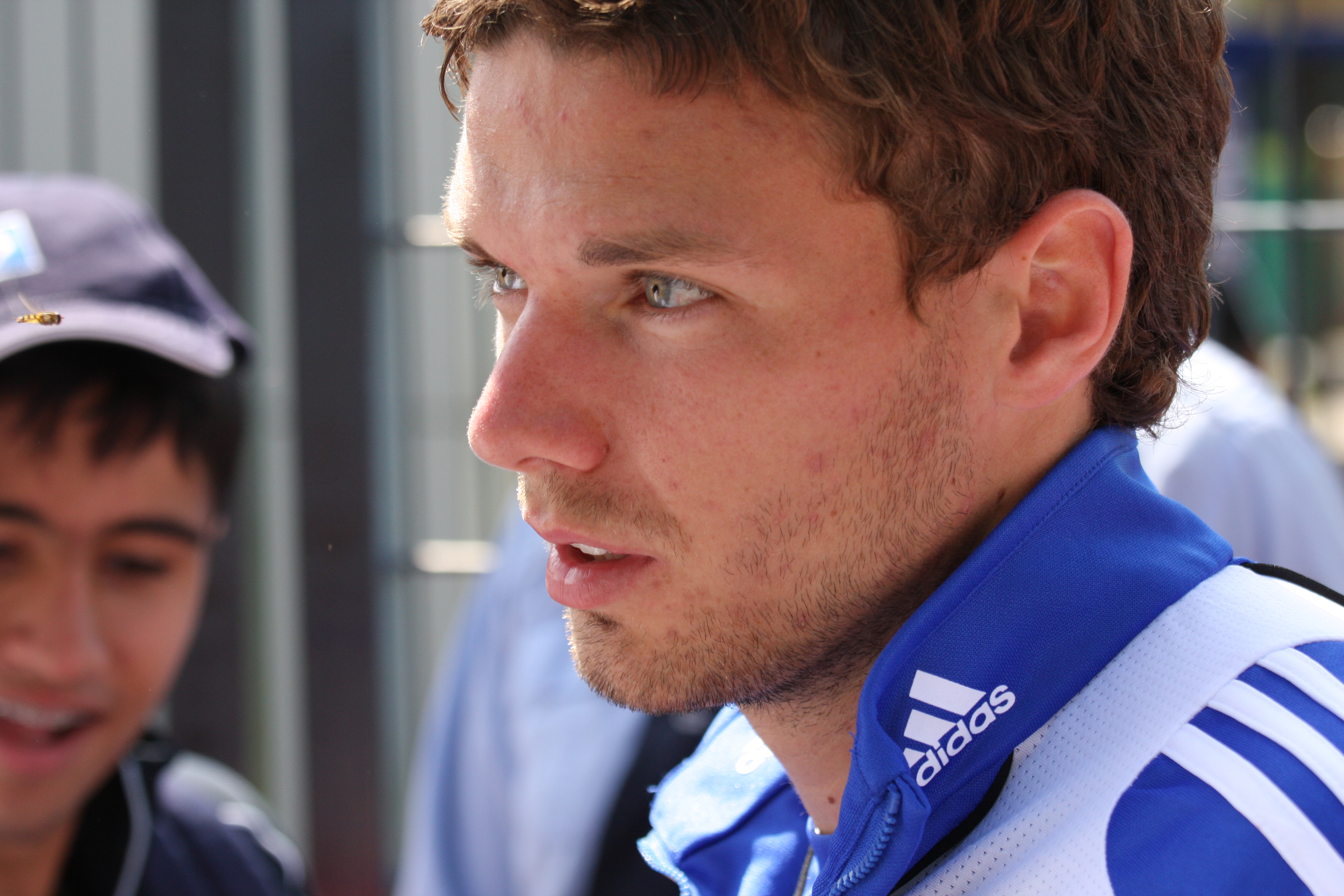
Marcus Berg

For the 2013–14 season, the membership had risen up to 9,305 members. Starting the football year, both fans and journalists were very sceptical of Panathinaikos' chances of a successful season, and many people expected the team to suffer relegation from the Super League Greece. In May 2013, Yannis Anastasiou was appointed manager, and he planned a team based on players from the Panathinaikos Youth Academies joined by experienced foreign players looking to revive their careers. Despite the early scepticism, Panathinaikos' fans supported the team through the rough start, and the season turned out to be a massive success in light of the dire financial situation of the club and the young and inexperienced squad. The club finished fourth in the regular season and second after the playoffs (meaning they qualified for the 2014–15 Champions League), with Marcus Berg the top scorer of the team. Panathinaikos also won the 2013–14 Greek Football Cup after a 4–1 win over PAOK.

On 2 November 2015, after bad performances and a home draw with AEK Athens, manager Yannis Anastasiou was sacked and replaced by Andrea Stramaccioni. Further successive poor results under the latter's reign, combined with loss of dressing room control, led to the dismissal of Stramaccioni on 1 December 2016, with former Panathinaikos player and Greece international Marinos Ouzounidis taking over the management at the club. Ouzounidis had some great moments with Panathinaikos and was generally liked by the fans. His resignation, due to problems with owner Giannis Alafouzos sparked another wave of disappointment and hatred against Alafouzos from the fans.

On 24 April 2018 UEFA decided to exclude Panathinaikos FC from participating in the next UEFA club competition for which it would otherwise qualify in the next three seasons as a result of Financial Fair Play breaches.

Georgios Donis was announced as the new coach on 3 July 2018. Coach Donis had a great start of the season despite beginning with −6 points in the championship, counting 6 consecutive wins that put Panathinaikos on top of the table. However, due to problems with his salary and a clash with Giannis Alafouzos, he was forced to resign in 2019. This situation made the relations between Alafouzos and the fans worse, with protests and demonstrations during games against him. Panathinaikos remained one of the top clubs in Greece, but its absence from European tournaments was a major factor in the fans' disappointment with the ownership. During the summer of 2020, a series of bad decisions were made from Giannis Alafouzos, who chose to let most of the players that had contributed to a very good season go.

Spaniard Dani Poyatos signed on as head of the club on 22 July 2020 for two years, taking over from George Donis' work. Poyatos was sacked after a poor start of the season on 12 October and was replaced by László Bölöni. After a disappointing fifth position in the league and the failure to guide them to a European qualification spot Bölöni was sacked and replaced by Ivan Jovanović.

During the 21–22 season under the management of Ivan Jovanović, the team achieved its major goal of returning to European Competitions finishing fourth, and won their 19th Greek Cup, beating PAOK 1–0 in the final ending an eight-year trophy drought. Ivan Jovanović was offered a two-year extension to his contract, which he accepted.

After a five-year absence from European Competitions, Panathinaikos won a place in the third qualifying round of the 2022–23 UEFA Europa Conference League, drawing Czech Slavia Prague. Any chance of return to a European group stage was lost after losing 3–1 on aggregate.

Their exclusion from Europe wasn't enough, since the squad was off to an exceptional start to the 2022–23 Super League Greece season, ultimately hitting the largest unbeaten streak in Europe for the 2022–23 season) of 16 matches, 3 of which were drawn. The streak ended when Panathinaikos faced second-placed AEK Athens, which ended in a 1–0 away loss. All eyes were on the fact that Panathinaikos finished the regular season placed first with 61 points, followed by AEK Athens with 59 points, a small difference between the two teams, with the remaining play-off round deciding who would lift the trophy. In the last round, Panathinaikos faced Aris Thessaloniki F.C. and the match ended at 1–1, (making it 78 points), ultimately ending hopes of achieving the first league title since 2010. AEK faced Volos, who were at the bottom of the play-offs table, which resulted in a 4–0 home win and the winning of the 2022-23 league for AEK Athens.

Their 2023–24 Super League Greece season started poorly. After finishing fourth in their Europa League group and losing 3–2 to Atromitos, Jovanović was rumoured to be sacked by the board. After a 3–0 win against Volos in late December, he was relieved of his duties, with Panathinaikos sitting in second place. He was replaced by Fatih Terim, who lasted less than 5 months and was relieved on 17th May 2024. Ultimately under the temporary stewardship of Christos Kontis, Panathinaikos ended the season by winning the 2023–24 Greek Football Cup after defeating Aris in the final 1–0, thus clinching their 20th Greek Cup title and sealing their position in the following year's 2024–25 UEFA Europa League second qualifying round.

On October 30, 2024, the club announced that Rui Vitória would be its next coach. The 2024-25 season proved to be difficult, overshadowed by the accidental death of squad player George Baldock. Despite this tragic loss, the team rallied and ended the season in 2nd place, securing Champions League play-offs. However during a lackluster start to their 2025–26 campaign, Panathinaikos terminated Vitória's contract on the 15 September 2025, less than a year after his appointment. A month later, on October 19, 2025, the club announced that Rafael Benítez would be its next coach.

== Crest and colours ==
=== Crest evolution ===
2015–present

White and red were the colours that were first used by the team in 1908. The first symbol of the club was a football of the era.

In 1910, the colours changed to green and white. In 1918, Michalis Papazoglou proposed the trifolium, symbol of harmony, unity, nature and good luck, as emblem of Panathinaikos. The officials of the club were looking for a universal, non-nationalistic or localistic, symbol aiming to represent the whole Athens at the country and further at the world. Papazoglou used to have it sewn on his shirt since he was competing for a club in his native Chalcedon, Constantinople (present-day Istanbul, Turkey). He was possibly inspired by Billy Sherring, an Irish Canadian athlete who had won the Athens 1906 Olympic marathon (1906 Intercalated Games) wearing a white outfit with a big green shamrock on the chest.

Georgios Chatzopoulos, member—and later president—of the club and director of the National Gallery, took over to design the new emblem for the team. Up to the end of the 1970s, a trifolium (green or white) was sewed on heart's side of the jersey and was big in size. With the beginning of professionalism, the crest of the F.C. was created, accompanied by the club initials and the year of founding, 1908.

Until today, the team's traditional colours are green and white (green for health, nature, such as physiolatry, and white for virtue), although the white sometimes is omitted, used as trim or as an alternative. During the first years after the establishment of green as Panathinaikos' primary colour, players were wearing green shirts, white shorts and green socks. During the 1930s, an appearance with characteristic horizontal strips was established. This motive was used also in the next decades as primary or second choice. Since then, the uniform style has changed many times, but green has always remained the team's primary colour.

=== Shirt sponsors and manufacturers ===
Since 1979, when football became professional in Greece, Panathinaikos had a specific kit manufacturer and since 1983 a specific shirt sponsor as well. The following table shows in detail Panathinaikos kit manufacturers and shirt sponsors by year:

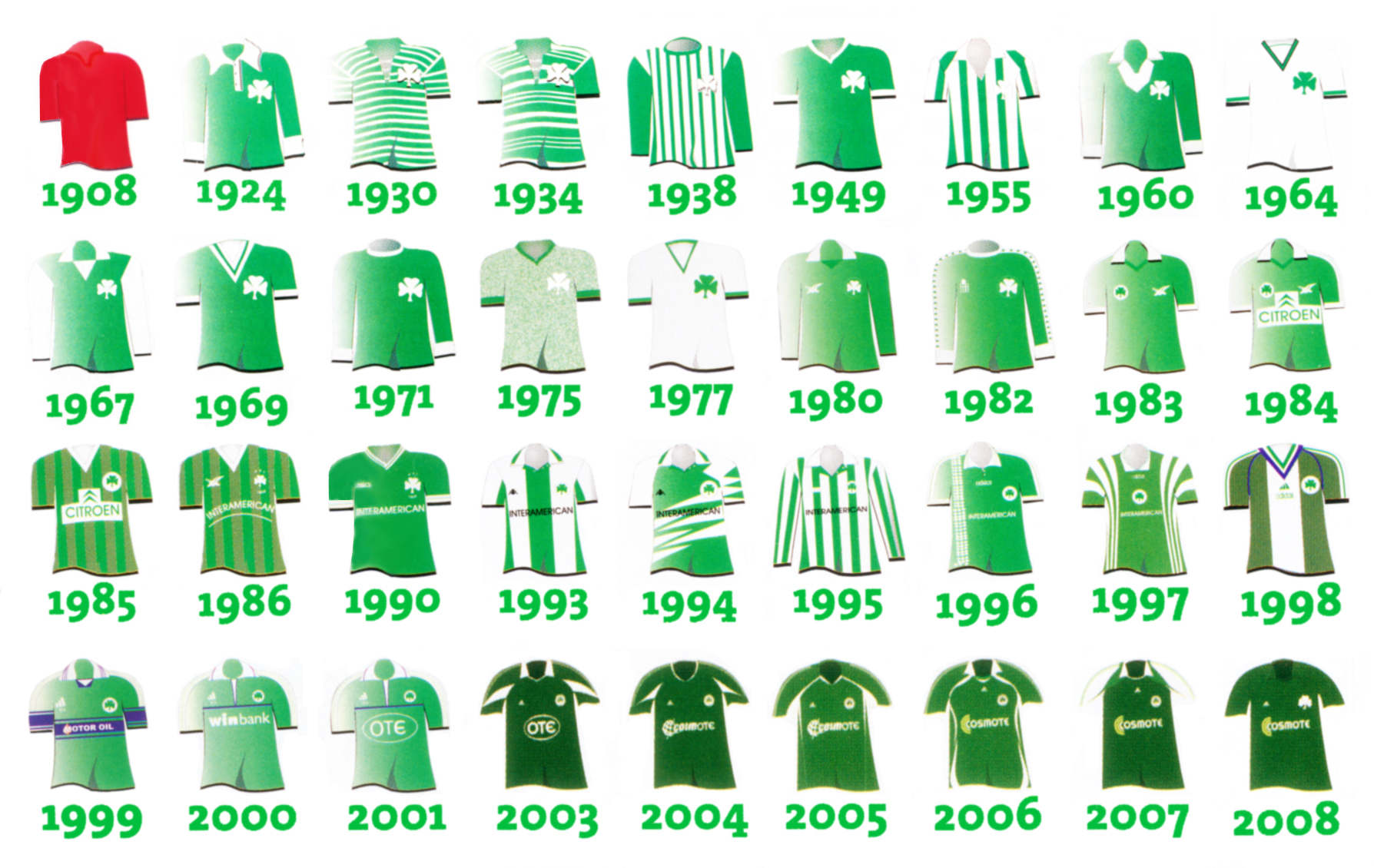
Panathinaikos FC shirt history

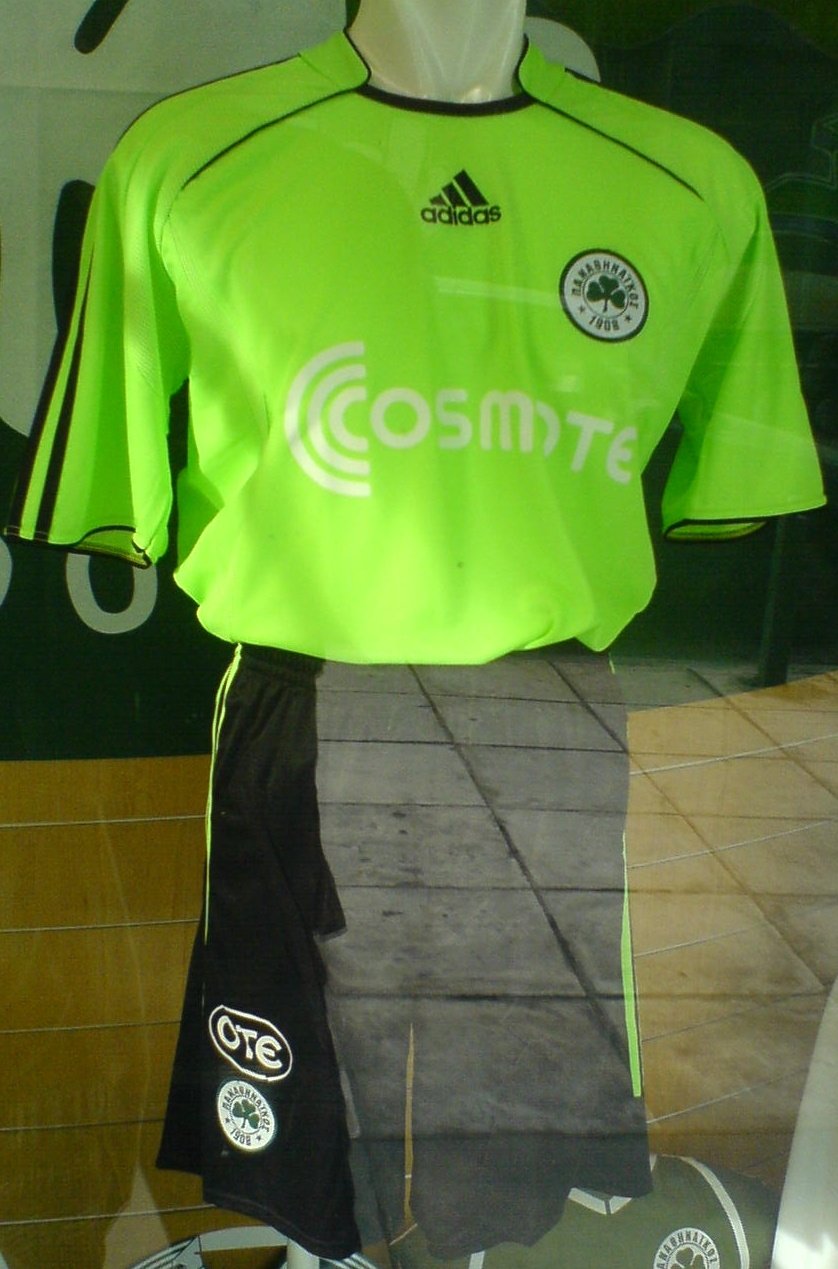
Panathinaikos alternative shirt (2008)

Period	Kit manufacturer	Shirt sponsor
1979–1980	Adidas	—
1980	Puma	—
1980–1981	ASICS Tiger	—
1981–1982	Admiral	—
1982–1983	ASICS Tiger	—
1983–1985	ASICS Tiger	Citroën
1986–1987	ASICS Tiger	Interamerican
1988–1993	ASICS	Interamerican
1993–1995	Kappa	Interamerican
1995–1997	Adidas	Interamerican
1997–1999	Adidas	—
1999–2000	Adidas	Motor Oil Hellas
2000–2001	Adidas	Piraeus Bank
2001–2004	Adidas	OTE
2004–2011	Adidas	Cosmote
2011–2014	Adidas	OPAP
2014–2015	Adidas	Pame Stoixima
2015–2017	Puma	Pame Stoixima
2017–2019	Nike	Pame Stoixima
2019–2022	Kappa	Pame Stoixima
2022–2023	Kappa	Stoiximan
2023–2025	Adidas	Stoiximan
2025–2026	Adidas	A Little Shelter
2026–	Adidas	Superbet

== Stadiums and facilities ==
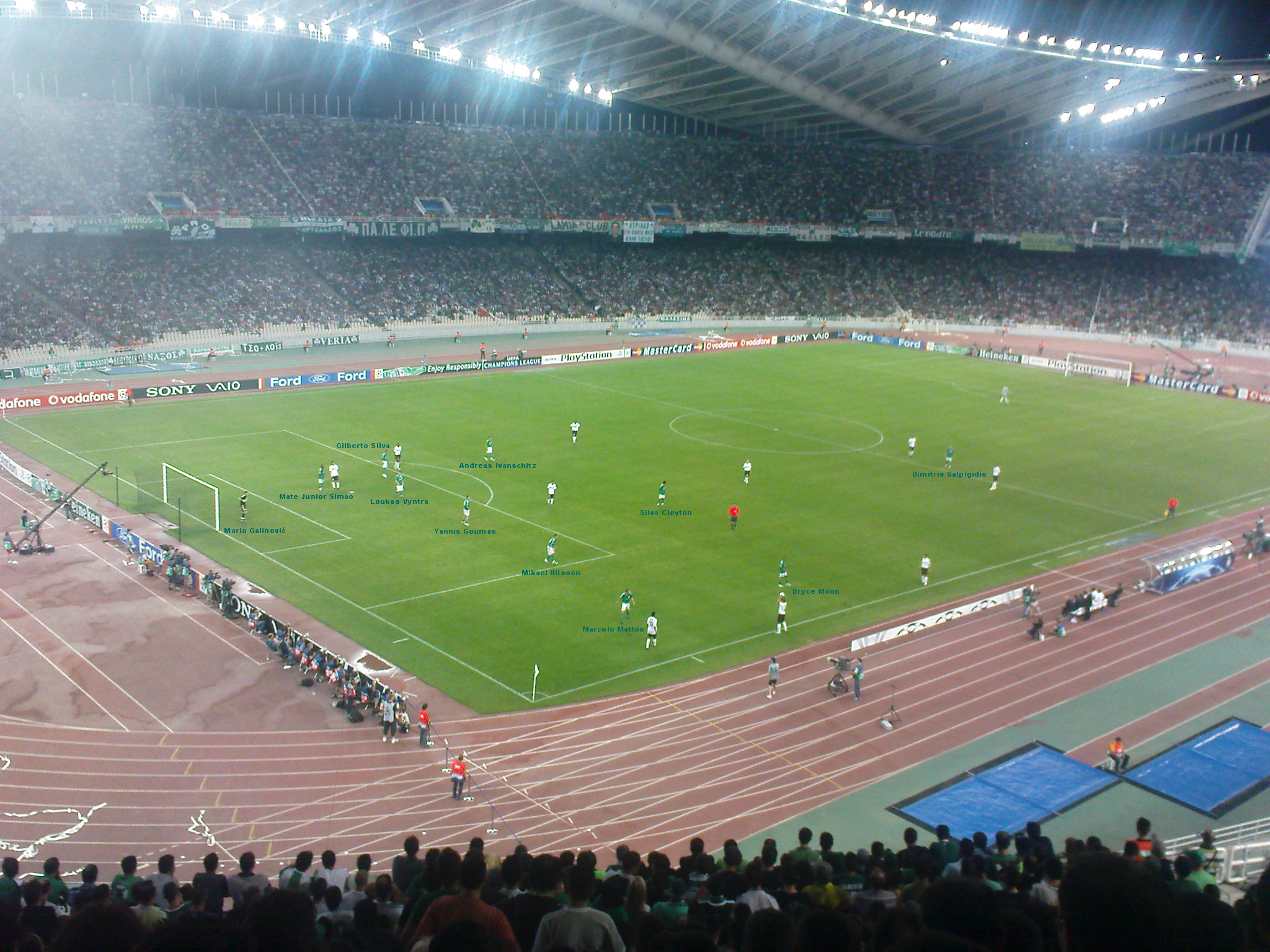
Olympic Stadium of Athens

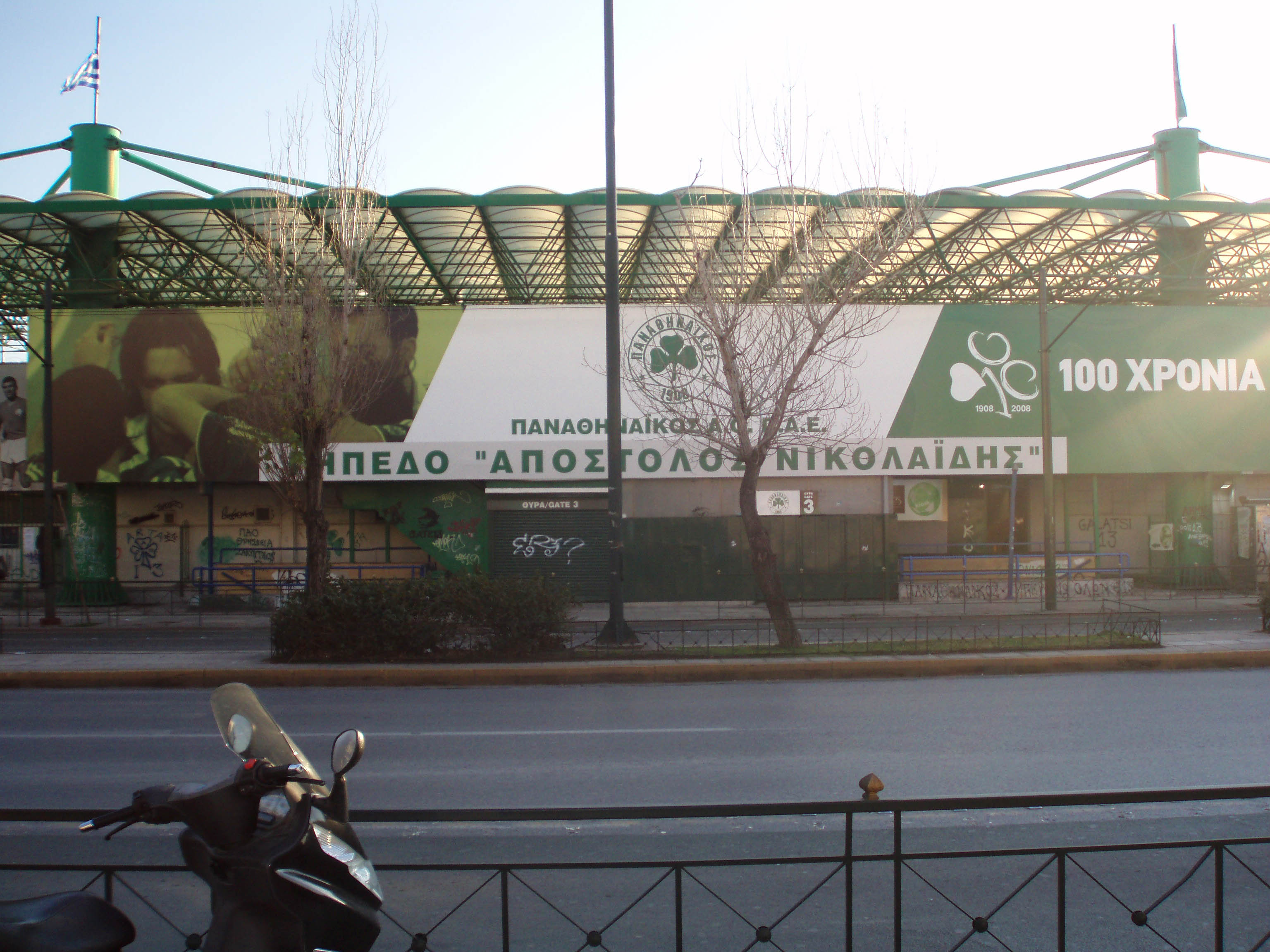
Leoforos Alexandras Stadium

Panathinaikos' traditional home ground since the early 1920s is the Leoforos Alexandras Stadium, the oldest active football stadium in Greece, in the Ampelokipoi district of central Athens. The stadium is located on Alexandras Avenue and is most commonly referred to as Leoforos (Greek for "Avenue"). It is considered one of the most historic stadiums in Greece, as it was used by the Greece national football team as home ground for many years (most recently for the UEFA Euro 2004 qualifying matches) and even by Panathinaikos' biggest rivals, AEK Athens and Olympiacos, on various occasions.

Panathinaikos left Leoforos in 1984 to play in the newly built Athens Olympic Stadium. In 2000, then-club president Angelos Filippidis announced a return to the Leoforos Alexandras Stadium, following a €7 million renovation. Capacity was reduced from 25,000 to 16,620, new dressing rooms were built and modular stand roofing was added in compliance with UEFA requirements, but in 2004, stricter standards were announced and the Leoforos Alexandras Stadium would need further expansion were it to remain suitable for UEFA-sanctioned matches. This was precluded by local zoning regulations and the team had to return to the Olympic Stadium once more until a new stadium, the proposed Votanikos Arena, was built. The Leoforos ground was due for demolition.

On 27 January 2007, the board of Panathinaikos decided to reuse the Leoforos Alexandras Stadium for the team's 2007–08 domestic league and UEFA Cup home games. Additionally, the club officials decided to install new a new pitch, new seats and upgrade the press conference room and the restrooms.

In October 2013, and due to the club's and the country's financial troubles, the construction of the Votanikos Arena stopped and consequently the plans for the demolition of the Leoforos Alexandras Stadium were put on hold. After another five-year spell at the Olympic Stadium, the team returned to its traditional home ground once again.

The current president of the club, Giannis Alafouzos, declared his intention for another renovation of the stadium and the capacity increase, while the Panathinaikos Movement made its propositions for a total reconstruction.

In 2019 the owner of Panathinaikos basketball team presented a funding plan for the construction of the new football and basketball stadiums. The Greek government confirmed in 2022 the construction of the new stadium in the Votanikos area near Eleonas metro station to be completed by 2027.

Stadium	Capacity	Years
Leoforos Alexandras Stadium	15,000	1923–1984; 1988–1989 2000–2005; 2007–2008; 2013–2018; 2020–2024; 2025–2026
Athens Olympic Stadium	69,618	1984–1988; 1989–2000 2005–2007; 2008–2013; 2018–2020; 2024–2025; 2026–present

Paiania used to be the training ground of Panathinaikos since 1981, the same year that the Panathinaikos F.C. Academy was reorganised into one of the best in Greece. It became the farm that trained its top-tier teams' notable players, such as Giorgos Karagounis, Angelos Basinas, Sotirios Kyrgiakos, Sotiris Ninis, and the Greece national team. In 2013, the club and academy would be moved from Paiania to that of the new Georgios Kalafatis Sports Center in Koropi, to be owned by the club and academy.

== Financial information ==
Until 1979, football in Greece was amateur. The team, along with the other departments of Panathinaikos A.O., depended on the financial support of the club's members. The president (responsible for all athletic departments) was elected by the board members. In 1979, Greece's football turned professional and the Vardinogiannis family purchased the football department. Giorgos Vardinogiannis became the new president. Vardinogiannis family were the owners of the club the next decades.

On 22 April 2008, growing pressure of the fan base over the past 30 years compelled the main shareholder representative of the club, Giannis Vardinogiannis, to announce at a press conference the family would reduce their financial stake in the club from 100 per cent to 50 per cent through an €80 million increase issue of the company's capital stock. Negotiations followed and the following were agreed: Nikos Pateras was selected to be the new president; the Vardinogiannis family would hold 56 per cent of the club, the amateur club 10 per cent (same as before) and a group of new shareholders 34 per cent (Pavlos Giannakopoulos, Nikos Pateras, Adamantios Polemis and Andreas Vgenopoulos, plus other minor shareholders).

In 2011, financial problems and management disagreements caused the club to reduce the budget and sell many players. In 2012, the owner of Skai TV, Giannis Alafouzos, devised a plan to take Vardinogiannis' shares (54.7%) and make them available to fans around Greece so that everyone could contribute, so that Panathinaikos could overcome the crisis. His intention was to create a new, for the Greek athletic standards, supporter-owned football club. On 2 July 2012, the Panathenaic Alliance finally opened to the public so that everyone could be a member and contribute a desired amount in return for privileges. A few days later, Giannis Vardinogiannis gave his shares—54.7% of Panathinaikos—to the Alliance, while the other shareholders maintained their percentage. The members of the Alliance elected a board of directors and club president. The first president elected was Giannis Alafouzos. In 2013, was decided the move of the team from the previous training center of Paiania to a new one, owned by the club. Located in the area of Koropi, Georgios Kalafatis Sports Center became the new training ground and academy base of Panathinaikos.

For the 2014–15 season, the membership had risen up to 8,495 members contributing a total of €2,680,041.

Season	Members	% Difference	Contribution
2012–13	8,606	–	€2,325,608
2013–14	9,305	+8.1%	€2,580,836
2014–15	8,495	-8.7%	€2,680,041
2015–16	8,802	+3.6%	€905,265
2016–17	8,060	-8.4%	€1,027,748

Panathinaikos currently is a partially supporter-owned football club. According to the latest accounts in 2016 Panathenaic Alliance shares have been reduced to (15%), Giannis Alafouzos through Sortivo International Ltd and his own shares is the largest shareholder at (74%). Giannis Alafouzos suddenly decided to quit the team in September 2017, announcing his departure in a written statement and inviting potential investors to express their interest in buying the team. With rapidly growing doubts about the commitment and the sporting progression of the club, Alafouzos eventually decided to re-invest in the playing and coaching staff around June 2021.

Current sponsorships:

- Shirt sponsor: Superbet, Allianz (sleeve)
- Sport clothing manufacturer: Adidas
- Broadcast Channel: SportFM TV
- Official sponsors: Telekom Greece, Omoda & Jaecoo, Piraeus Bank, Coca-Cola Zero, Car.gr, Ygeia Group
- Supporters: Funky Buddha, Solgar, Aktina Travel Group, Hans & Gretel, Dionysos Zonars, Pizza Fan, Athinais Maritime Corp., Glafki Marine Corp.

== Supporters ==
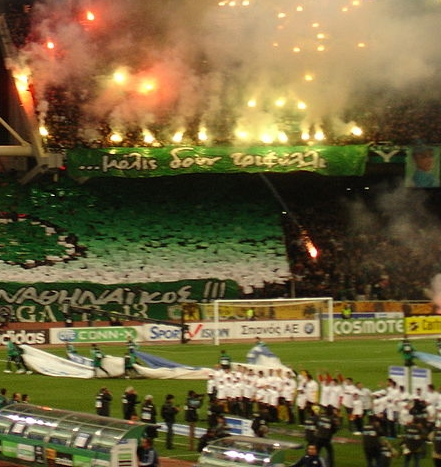
Fans of Panathinaikos at the Olympic Stadium of Athens

Panathinaikos was founded by middle class athletes (with Giorgos Kalafatis as a key figure) aiming of spreading and making more known football to the Athenian and Greek public in general. Also, their intention was to create a team for all of Athens and to be connected with the rest of the European football movement, which was already active.

Today, according to UEFA and numerous polls and researches by the biggest newspapers and poll companies in a span of 20 years, Panathinaikos is the second most popular football team in Greece, with the difference behind Olympiacos to be varied between 2% and 9% among the fans. They have the highest popularity in Athens metropolitan area according to many of the corresponding polls, having also a large fanbase in all Greek prefectures, in Cyprus and in the Greek diaspora. They historically have a large fanbase among the highly educated Greek upper class (traditionally representing the old Athenian society), while they are also very popular among the middle and lower classes.

Panathinaikos supporters hold both records of the most season tickets sales (31,091 in 2010) and highest average attendance for a unique season (44,942 in the 1985–86 season) in the history of Greek football.

The main organised supporters of Panathinaikos are known as Gate 13 (established in 1966), the oldest fan association in Greece, which consists of around 80 clubs alongside Greece and Cyprus. Gate 13 style of supporting includes the use of green fireworks, large and small green flags, displaying of banners and especially the creation of colourful and large choreographies, noisy and constant cheering and other supporters stuff. Gate 13 has over the years become a part of the club by affecting club decisions and by following the club on all occasions.

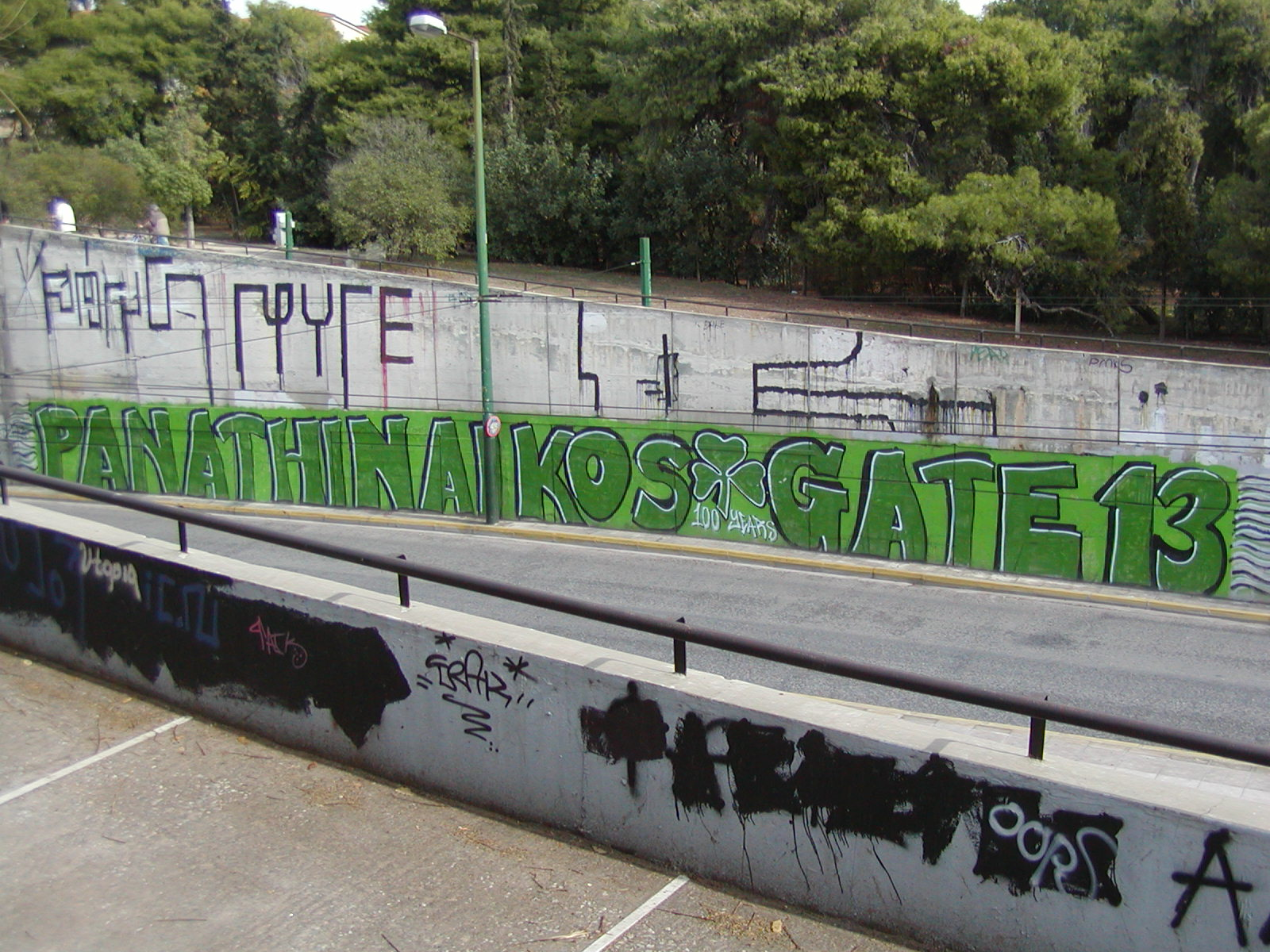
Gate 13 graffiti in Athens

They share a traditional friendship with the Hungarian club Ferencváros and Ultras Rapid Wien, based mainly on the common green and white colours. Moreover, they have been sharing since the early 10s' close relations with Dinamo Zagreb's Bad Blue Boys (based on their common rivalry with Red Star and Olympiacos fans, capital city teams and mutual respect for each other's ultras achievements) and also with Fedayin of A.S. Roma based on the capital city team factor, their mutual respect and the ancient Athens and ancient Roma cultural connection.

PALEFIP (Panhellenic club of Panathinaikos friends) is another supporters organisation.

Panathenaic Alliance, a collective organisation of the fan base, is the major shareholder of the football club, making it currently the only supporter-owned football club in Greece. The members of the Alliance, through elections, compose the board of directors and elect the club's president.

Panathinaikos Movement, founded in 2012, is also a Greek political party founded by people with an initial common their love for the sports club of Panathinaikos and the wish for a new stadium for the football team, despite the bureaucracy of the Greek state.

== Statistics and records ==
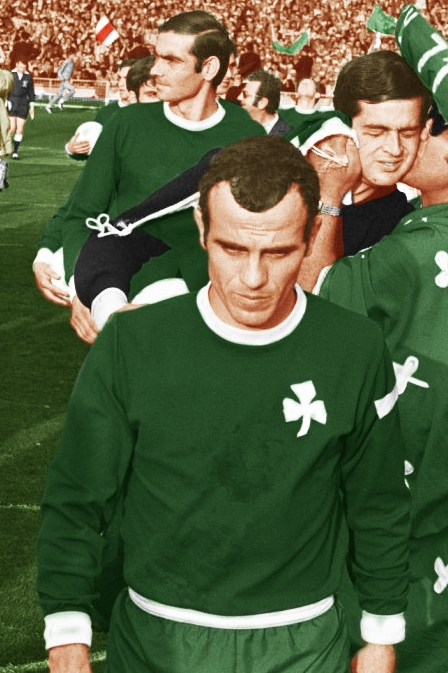
Mimis Domazos, nicknamed the General. A tireless central midfielder and the emblematic captain of Panathinaikos

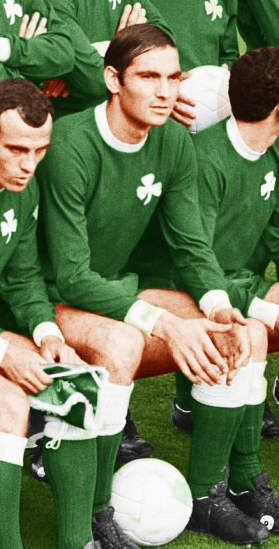
Antonis Antoniadis, top scorer in the 1970–71 European Cup and a record five times top scorer for the Greek league

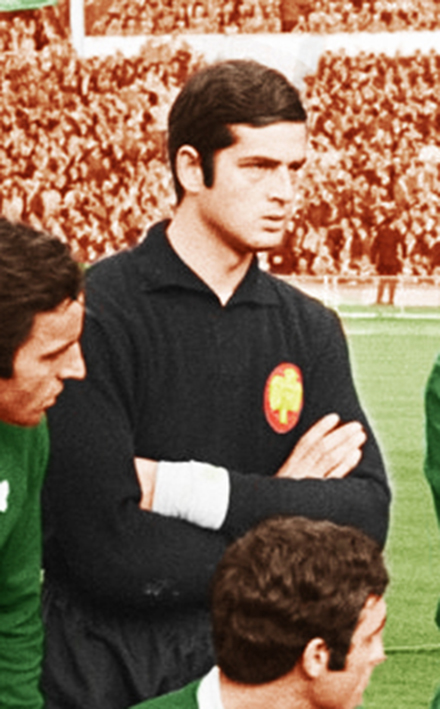
Takis Ikonomopoulos

Mimis Domazos holds the record for Panathinaikos appearances, having played 502 first-team matches between 1959 and 1980. Striker Krzysztof Warzycha comes second, having played 390 times. The record for a goalkeeper is held by Takis Ikonomopoulos, with 303 appearances.

Krzysztof Warzycha is the club's top goalscorer with 319 goals in all competitions between 1989 and 2004, having surpassed Antonis Antoniadis' total of 180 in January 1998.

Panathinaikos record home attendance is 74,493, for a Greek League match against AEK Athens in 1986 at the Olympic Stadium. The record attendance for a Panathinaikos match at the Leoforos Alexandras Stadium is from 1967, when 29,665 spectators watched the Cup Winners' Cup game between Panathinaikos and Bayern Munich.

Panathinaikos is one of the two clubs in the history of Greek football to finish a top-flight (after 1959) campaign unbeaten. This happened in the 1963–64 season.

League top scorers

Player	Nationality	Goals
Krzysztof Warzycha	(Poland)	244
Antonis Antoniadis	(Greece)	180
Mimis Domazos	(Greece)	134
Dimitris Saravakos	(Greece)	128
Kostas Eleftherakis	(Greece)	85

Most league appearances

Player	Nationality	Matches
Mimis Domazos	(Greece)	510
Krzysztof Warzycha	(Poland)	390
Kostas Antoniou	(Greece)	320
Anthimos Kapsis	(Greece)	319
Frangiskos Sourpis	(Greece)	311

One-Club players

Player	Nationality	Position	Debut	Last match
Vangelis Panakis	(Greece)	FW	1950	1965
Anthimos Kapsis	(Greece)	DF	1969	1984
Giannis Goumas	(Greece)	DF	1994	2009
Giannis Papantoniou	(Greece)	MF	1945	1958
Frangiskos Sourpis	(Greece)	DF	1962	1973

=== Super League top scorers ===
Rank.	Nationality	Player	Times	Seasons
1	(Greece)	Antonis Antoniadis	5 (Greek record)	1970, 1972, 1973, 1974, 1975
2	(Poland)	Krzysztof Warzycha	3	1994, 1995, 1998
3	(France)	Djibril Cissé	2	2010, 2011
4	(Greece)	Dimitris Saravakos	1	1991
5	(Greece)	Nikos Liberopoulos	1	2003
6	(Greece)	Angelos Messaris	1	1930
7	(Greece)	Filippos Asimakopoulos	1	1955
8	(Greece)	Tasos Kritikos	1	1936
9	(Sweden)	Marcus Berg	1	2017

=== Most goals in a season ===
Rank.	Nationality	Player	Goals	Season
1	(Greece)	Antonis Antoniadis	39 goals (Greek record)	1971–72 (also second -less one goal- in Europe, "Silver Boot")

=== Top scorers in European competitions ===
Uefa Champions League

Rank.	Nationality	Player	Times	Seasons
1	(Greece)	Antonis Antoniadis	1	1970–71

UEFA Cup

Rank.	Nationality	Player	Times	Seasons
1	(Greece)	Dimitris Saravakos	1	1987–88

=== Domestic team's records ===
Outline	Record
Champions without a loss	2 (1929–30, 1952–53)
Champions without a loss in a top-flight campaign (after 1959)	once (1963–64)
Biggest win in a Greek Super Cup match	3–0 (vs AEK, 1994)

== Honours ==
Panathinaikos F.C. honours
Type	Competition	Titles	Seasons
Domestic	Super League Greece	20	1929–30, 1948–49, 1952–53, 1959–60, 1960–61, 1961–62, 1963–64, 1964–65, 1968–69, 1969–70, 1971–72, 1976–77, 1983–84, 1985–86, 1989–90, 1990–91, 1994–95, 1995–96, 2003–04, 2009–10
Domestic	Greek Cup	20	1939–40, 1947–48, 1954–55, 1966–67, 1968–69, 1976–77, 1981–82, 1983–84, 1985–86, 1987–88, 1988–89, 1990–91, 1992–93, 1993–94, 1994–95, 2003–04, 2009–10, 2013–14, 2021–22, 2023–24
Domestic	Greek Super Cup	3	1988, 1993, 1994
International	Balkans Cup	1	1977

- record
- ^{s} shared record

=== Doubles ===
- Winners (8): 1968–69, 1976–77, 1983–84, 1985–86, 1990–91, 1994–95, 2003–04, 2009–10

=== Continental Trebles ===
- Winners (1): 1976–77

1976–77 Alpha Ethniki, 1976–77 Greek Football Cup, 1977 Balkans Cup

=== Regional Titles ===
- Athens FCA Championship
  - Winners (17) (record): 1925, 1926, 1927, 1929, 1930, 1931, 1934, 1937, 1939, 1949, 1952, 1953, 1954, 1955, 1956, 1957, 1959

== International record ==
=== European competitions ===
- UEFA Champions League
  - Runners-up (1): 1971
  - Semi-finals (2): 1985, 1996
  - Quarter-finals (2): 1992, 2002
- UEFA Europa League
  - Quarter-finals (2): 1988, 2003
- Balkans Cup
  - Winners (1): 1977

=== Worldwide competitions ===
- Intercontinental Cup
  - Runners-up (1): 1971

== Players ==
=== Current squad ===
As of 17 September 2026

Note: Flags indicate national team as defined under FIFA eligibility rules; some limited exceptions apply. Players may hold more than one non-FIFA nationality.

No.	Pos.	Nation	Player
1	GK	ESP	Iñaki Peña
2	DF	ITA	Davide Calabria (vice-captain)
3	DF	GRE	Giorgos Katris
4	MF	ESP	Pedro Chirivella
5	DF	MAR	Anass Salah-Eddine (on loan from Roma)
6	DF	NED	Stefan de Vrij (captain)
7	FW	GRE	Andrews Tetteh
8	MF	CRO	Adriano Jagušić
9	FW	NGR	Cyriel Dessers
10	MF	ARG	Santino Andino
12	GK	ARG	Lucas Chaves (on loan from Argentinos Juniors)
14	DF	USA	Erik Palmer-Brown
15	DF	ISL	Sverrir Ingi Ingason
17	MF	GRE	Pavlos Pantelidis
18	MF	GRE	Sotiris Kontouris

No.	Pos.	Nation	Player
19	DF	GRE	Triantafyllos Tsapras
20	MF	ARG	Vicente Taborda
21	MF	MAR	Azzedine Ounahi
22	MF	FRA	Etienne Camara
26	MF	MAR	Imrân Louza
28	MF	URU	Facundo Pellistri
34	DF	DEN	Victor Kristiansen (on loan from Leicester City)
39	MF	GRE	Giannis Bokos
42	MF	ZAM	Kings Kangwa
55	DF	NED	Rick van Drongelen
70	GK	GRE	Konstantinos Kotsaris
74	FW	MKD	Elmin Rastoder
77	DF	GRE	Giorgos Kyriakopoulos
99	FW	TTO	Levi García (on loan from Spartak Moscow)

=== Youth Academy ===
Note: Flags indicate national team as defined under FIFA eligibility rules; some limited exceptions apply. Players may hold more than one non-FIFA nationality.

No.	Pos.	Nation	Player
44	MF	GRE	Panagiotis Biniaris
53	FW	GRE	Iason Nempis

No.	Pos.	Nation	Player
56	DF	GRE	Vasilis Lavdas
71	GK	GRE	Christos Geitonas

=== Other players under contract ===
Note: Flags indicate national team as defined under FIFA eligibility rules; some limited exceptions apply. Players may hold more than one non-FIFA nationality.

No.	Pos.	Nation	Player
32	MF	FRA	Moussa Sissoko

=== Out on loan ===
Note: Flags indicate national team as defined under FIFA eligibility rules; some limited exceptions apply. Players may hold more than one non-FIFA nationality.

No.	Pos.	Nation	Player
—	DF	ALG	Ahmed Touba (at Le Havre until 30 June 2027)
—	DF	GRE	Angelos Vyntra (at PAC Omonia 29M until 30 June 2027)
—	DF	GRE	Nektarios Kaloskamis (at A.E. Kifisia until 30 June 2027)
—	MF	GRE	Rushit Zeka (at PAC Omonia 29M until 30 June 2027)
11	MF	MAR	Anass Zaroury (at Columbus Crew until 30 June 2027)

No.	Pos.	Nation	Player
—	MF	GRE	Giorgos Kyriopoulos (at A.E. Kifisia until 30 June 2027)
—	MF	ALB	Aidon Shehu (at PAS Pyrgos until 30 June 2027)
72	FW	SRB	Miloš Pantović (at FK Železničar Pančevo until 30 June 2027)
—	FW	GRE	Giorgos Sokos (at PAC Omonia 29M until 30 June 2027)

=== Retired numbers ===
- 13 Gate 13 - Dedicated to the fans
- 32 (England) (Greece) George Baldock, Defender (2024) – posthumous honour

== Contribution to the Greece national team ==
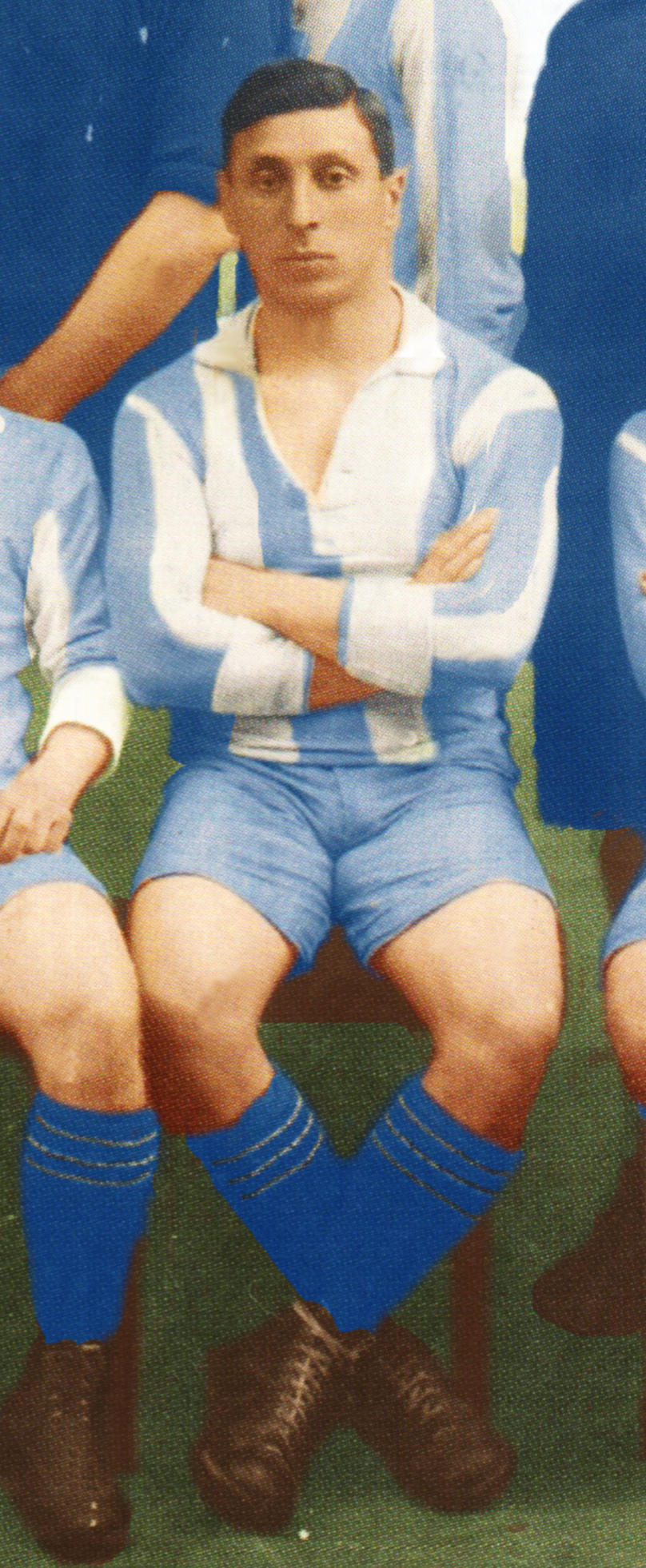
Kalafatis with the national colours (1919)

Overall, Panathinaikos has a significant contribution to the Greece national football team. Giorgos Kalafatis, the founder of Panathinaikos, was the member of the Greece national team that participated in the Inter-Allied Games in Paris, while later he was also a player/manager for Greece in the 1920 Olympic Games in Antwerp. During the next decades, Panathinaikos highlighted some of the best Greek players in the history of Greek football, who contributed also to the national team (Migiakis, Linoxilakis, Loukanidis, Domazos, Antoniadis, Kapsis, Ikonomopoulos, Saravakos etc.). Six Panathinaikos players were members of the first appearance of the national team in a World Cup in 1994 (Saravakos, Kolitsidakis, Apostolakis, Kalitzakis, Nioplias, Marangos).

Six players of the club were part of the golden team of 2004 that won the UEFA Euro 2004 (UEFA Euro 2004): Giourkas Seitaridis, Angelos Basinas, Giannis Goumas, Dimitrios Papadopoulos, Kostas Chalkias, Antonis Nikopolidis.

== Personnel ==
=== Technical staff ===
Position	Staff
Head coach	(Denmark) Jacob Neestrup
Assistant coach	(Denmark) Stefan Madsen (Denmark) Morten Mølkjær (Portugal) (Greece) Zeca
Goalkeeper coach	(Denmark) Casper Ankergren (Greece) Giorgos Mountakis
Head of performance	(Denmark) Anders Storskov
Assistant physical trainer	(Greece) Angelos Kontarinis
Rehabilitation coach	(Greece) Vasilis Drouzas (Greece) Panagiotis Papatheodorou
Analysts	(Denmark) Nicklas Pedersen (Greece) Giannis Antonopoulos (Greece) Iraklis Tsarouchis

=== Club staff ===
Position	Staff
Technical director	(Greece) Stefanos Kotsolis
Assistant technical director	(Greece) Dimitris Goumas
Team administrative manager	(Greece) Grigoris Papavasiliou
Chief of medical staff	(Greece) Dionysios Chissas
Doctor	(Greece) Charis Lalos
Physiotherapist	(Greece) Panagiotis Petropoulos (Greece) Michael Papamichail (Greece) Odisseas Paya (Greece) Giorgos Kalopitas (Greece) Giannis Stekas (Greece) Fotis Sotiriou
Εrgophysiologist-Nutritionist	(Greece) Giorgos Papadimitriou (Greece) Giannis Tsekouras
Chiropractor	(Greece) Evangelos Dimou
Kit assistants	(Greece) Giannis Giannakopoulos (Greece) Nektarios Diamantakos (Greece) Thodoris Katsas (Greece) Christos Milios
Scout	(Greece) Makis Livathinos (Greece) Alexandros Zafiriou (Greece) Kyriakos Konstantinidis (Greece) Spyros Marangos

== Management ==
As of 24 August 2026

Position	Staff
Ownership	(Greece) Giannis Alafouzos (45%) (Greece) (Cyprus) Sortivo International Ltd (45%)
President	(Greece) Giannis Alafouzos
CEO	(Greece) Stefanos Giourelis
Vice-President	(Greece) Leonidas Mpoutsikaris (Greece) Athina Mpalomenou (Greece) Takis Fyssas
Chief Executive Officer	(Greece) Stefanos Giourelis
Board member	(Greece) Anna Loumidi (Greece) Giorgos Mathiopoulos (Greece) Spyros Vlachos (Greece) Dimitris Vranopoulos

== Gallery ==
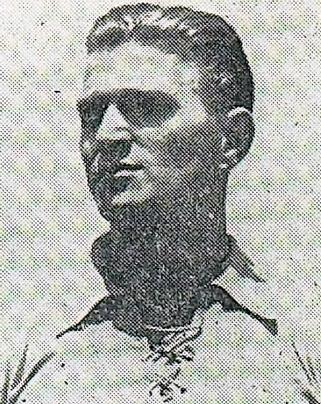
Stjepan Bobek, head coach (1963–67)

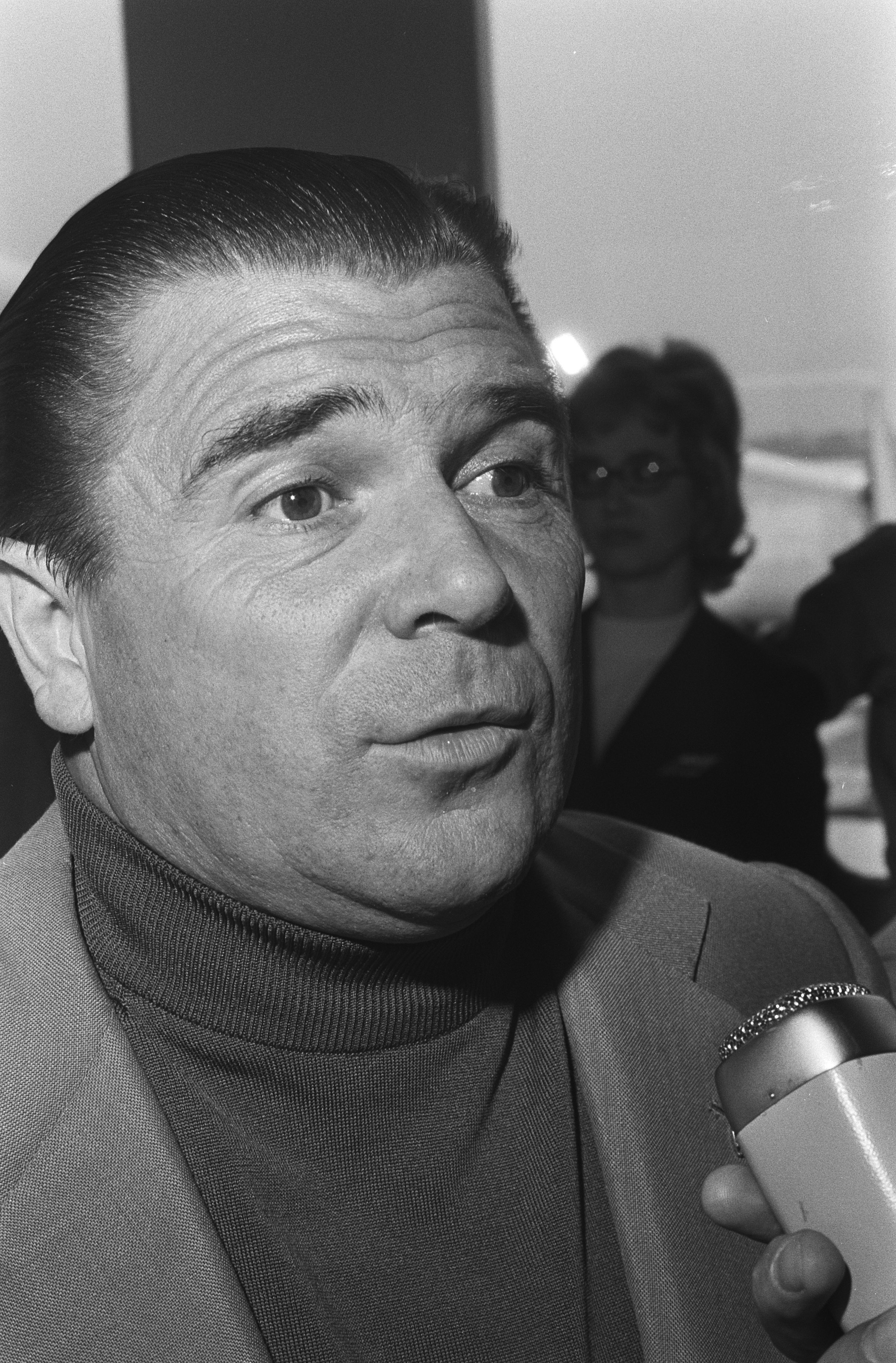
Ferenc Puskás, head coach (1970–74)

== See also ==
Sports

- Panathinaikos A.O.
- Panathinaikos B
- Panathinaikos women's football
- Panathinaikos F.C. Academy
- Panathinaikos B.C.
- Panathinaikos women's basketball
- Panathinaikos V.C.
- Panathinaikos women's volleyball

Other

- European Club Association
- List of unrelegated association football clubs
