= Adamantios Polemis =

Greek shipowner and shareholder of Panathinaikos F.C.

Adamantios Polemis is a Greek major shipowner and shareholder of Panathinaikos F.C., from Andros. He was the president of Polembros Maritime, that was, back then, inside the 10 biggest Greek shipping companies, until 2014, when he left from the company. Nowadays, he is president of New Shipping Company.
